= SEC v. Jarkesy =

Case before the Supreme Court of the United States

- Supreme Court of the United States

Argued November 29, 2023 Decided June 27, 2024
- Full case name: Securities and Exchange Commission, Petitioner v. George R. Jarkesy, Jr., et al.
- Docket no.: 22-859
- Argument: Oral argument
- Opinion announcement: Opinion announcement
- Decision: Opinion

Case history
- Prior: Jarkesy v. SEC, 34 F.4th 446 (5th Cir. 2022)

Questions presented
- 1. Whether statutory provisions that empower the Securities and Exchange Commission to initiate and adjudicate administrative enforcement proceedings seeking civil penalties violate the Seventh Amendment; 2. Whether statutory provisions that authorize the SEC to choose to enforce the securities laws through an agency adjudication instead of filing a district court action violate the non-delegation doctrine; 3. Whether Congress violated Article II by granting for-cause removal protection to administrative law judges in agencies whose heads enjoy for-cause removal protection.

Holding
- When the SEC seeks civil penalties against a defendant for securities fraud, the Seventh Amendment entitles the defendant to a jury trial.

Court membership
- Chief Justice John Roberts Associate Justices Clarence Thomas · Samuel Alito; Sonia Sotomayor · Elena Kagan; Neil Gorsuch · Brett Kavanaugh; Amy Coney Barrett · Ketanji Brown Jackson

Case opinions
- Majority: Roberts, joined by Thomas, Alito, Gorsuch, Kavanaugh, Barrett
- Concurrence: Gorsuch, joined by Thomas
- Dissent: Sotomayor, joined by Kagan, Jackson

Laws applied
- U.S. Const. amend. VII; Securities Act of 1933; Securities Exchange Act of 1934; Investment Advisers Act of 1940

Securities and Exchange Commission v. Jarkesy, 603 U.S. 109 (2024), was a case before the Supreme Court of the United States. In May 2022, the Court of Appeals for the Fifth Circuit held, under certain statutory provisions, the Securities and Exchange Commission's administrative adjudication of fraud claims without jury trials in their administrative proceedings with their own administrative law judges (ALJs) rather than Article III judges violated three provisions of the Constitution. The justices ruled that the Securities and Exchange Commission violated the Seventh Amendment.

The United States Supreme Court issued its decision in June 2024, and in a 6-3 opinion, ruled that those charged with civil penalties by the SEC have the right to a jury trial, under the Seventh Amendment, but did not consider the other questions raised.

== Background ==
Prior to the Dodd-Frank Wall Street Reform and Consumer Protection Act, only registered entities such as broker-dealers or licensed investment advisers were subject to the Investment Advisers Act's administrative enforcement provisions. In response to the Great Recession, Congress purported to empower the SEC to impose harsh civil penalties against any private citizen through its own administrative adjudications with only limited, after-the-fact review by a federal court of appeals. Dodd-Frank effectively bestowed to the SEC "coextensive" authority with federal court to impose civil penalties.

In 2007 and 2009, George Jarkesy created two small hedge funds totaling $24 million that invested in bridge loans to start-up companies, equity investments principally in microcap companies, and life settlement policies. Jarkesy brought in Patriot28 LLC as an investment advisor to these funds. In part due the Great Recession, the funds lost value, and Jarkesy and Patriot28 were alleged by the SEC to have overestimated the value of the hedge fund assets and made other false claims. Under Dodd-Frank's new provisions, after an investigation, the SEC opted to use internal proceedings rather than a jury trial to evaluate its claims against Jarkesy and Patriot28. The SEC initiated the enforcement action on March 22, 2013, with its ALJ. The SEC's enforcement mechanism does not provide a jury trial or access to an Article III judge, only an in-house administrative law judge at the SEC.

In 2014, Jarkesy and Patriot28 filed a collateral challenge to the administrative enforcement action in district court to stay the administrative proceedings, alleging that the proceedings violated his Seventh Amendment and equal protection rights, that Dodd-Frank violated the Non-delegation Doctrine, and that the ALJs violate the Appointments Clause. On appeal, the United States Court of Appeals for the D.C. Circuit in 2015 applied Thunder Basin Coal Co. v. Reich's implied jurisdictional preclusion of collateral lawsuits to the SEC's statutory structure, holding that federal courts do not have subject matter jurisdiction to hear even structural constitutional claims until after the adjudicative process and final order of the Commission. The D.C. Circuit did not address the merits of the constitutional objections but held that Jarkesy was required to raise and exhaust his constitutional objections—about the ALJs and the SEC—to the ALJ and the SEC before judicial review of final agency action would be available.

Five years after the SEC initiated the enforcement action against Jarkesy, the Supreme Court of the United States held in Lucia v. Securities and Exchange Commission in 2018 that the SEC's ALJs are inferior officers of the Executive Branch subject to the Appointments Clause of Article II of the United States Constitution and must be appointed by the President or a delegated officer. The Supreme Court's decision allowed any defendant in pending SEC administrative proceedings before unconstitutionally appointed ALJs to request a new ALJ and hearing. Jarkesy and Patriot28 waived the Lucia error remedy to avoid prolonging the adjudicative process.

In 2020, seven years after initiating the enforcement action, the Commission concluded that based on existing evidence from the ALJ's proceedings, Jarkesy and Patriot28 were liable, and the Commission imposed $300,000 in civil penalties and $685,000 in disgorgement. Jarkesy was also barred from any future investments-related activities. As did the ALJ, the commission also rejected each of Jarkesy's constitutional challenges. Jarkesy appealed to the Fifth Circuit.

Five months after oral argument, the SEC issued a statement revealing a control deficiency where SEC staff misappropriated internal documents relating to Jarkesy along with Cochran v. SEC which also raised constitutional challenges before the ALJ. Dating back to 2017, adjudication staff submitted memos to the commission, and because internal databases were improperly configured, personnel from the enforcement division had access to these adjudication memos. Under 5 U.S.C. § 554(d) of the Administrative Procedure Act (APA), these memoranda are supposed to be kept confidential within divisions to keep adjudicative, investigative and prosecutorial staff separated. The SEC claimed that while ten reports were affected, they did not find any evidence that the improper disclosures impacted its findings. This led to additional criticism of the SEC's enforcement practices from groups such as the U.S. Chamber of Commerce and called for reform of the SEC.

== Fifth Circuit ==
The Fifth Circuit ruled on May 18, 2022, 2–1 in favor of Jarkesy. Judge Jennifer Walker Elrod, writing for the majority, held that the SEC could not impose civil penalties for fraud through administrative law judges because doing so denied defendants their Seventh Amendment right to a jury trial. Although Congress can assign some matters to agencies, the court held that fraud penalties are the type of claim that must be decided in court when they involve the same legal rights traditionally protected by juries. The Supreme Court’s decision in Granfinanciera, S.A. v. Nordberg held that Congress cannot avoid jury trials simply by placing a claim in an administrative agency. Therefore, the court found that the SEC’s administrative enforcement process violated Jarkesy’s constitutional rights.

The Fifth Circuit identified two additional constitutional problems. First, it held that Congress violated the nondelegation doctrine by giving the SEC discretion, without adequate guidance, to choose whether to bring an enforcement action in an Article III court or to adjudicate the matter before its own administrative law judges. The SEC contended that the agency's broad discretion under Dodd Frank to choose between administrative and district court did not have nor need an intelligible principle because, it contended, the choice of forum is unreviewable prosecutorial discretion under Heckler v. Chaney.

Finally, ALJs are considered inferior officers under Article II but had at least two layers of for-cause protection from removal, which interfered with the President's ability to Take Care that the laws be faithfully executed.

Judge Andy Oldham joined Judge Elrod in the majority. Senior Judge W. Eugene Davis dissented.

The attorney for Jarkesy is S. Michael McColloch, while Daniel J. Aguilar of the Civil Division of the Department of Justice argued for the SEC.

== Supreme Court ==
The Supreme Court had already granted certiorari to Axon Enterprise, Inc. v. Federal Trade Commission and SEC v. Cochran for the 2022–23 term, which address whether defendants in administrative proceedings can challenge in district court the constitutionality of ALJs within the Federal Trade Commission and the SEC before final agency action. The Supreme Court granted the petition for certiorari in Cochran two days prior to the Fifth Circuit's decision.

=== Majority ===
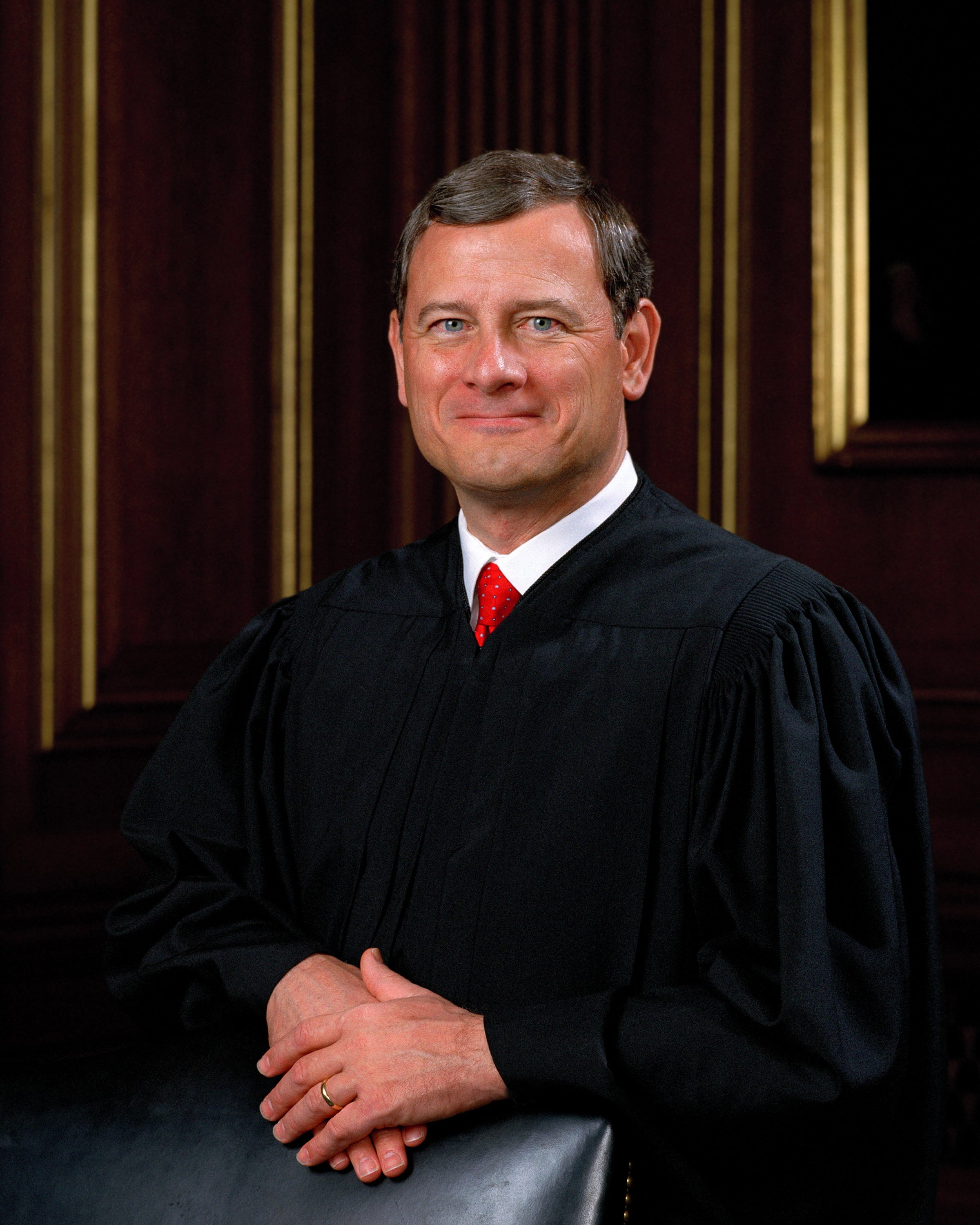
Chief Justice John Roberts delivered the opinion of the Court

Chief Justice John Roberts authored the majority opinion on June 27, 2024, joined by Justices Thomas, Alito, Gorsuch, Kavanaugh, and Barrett. In his opinion, Roberts vacated the SEC's imposition of civil penalties against Jarkesy determining that the seventh amendment provided for a right to a jury trial as the administrative claims brought by the SEC constituted a "suit at common law". While acknowledging that the claims brought by the SEC rested upon federal statutes and not forms of common law recognized at the adoption of the seventh amendment, Roberts contended that coverage of the right to a jury trial extended to "any statutory claim so long as the law is 'legal in nature.'" As per English common law, A suit may either be a 'suit at common law' or a 'suit in equity', with a 'suit at common law' being "legal in nature" and subsequently implicating the seventh amendment. Monetary relief may be applicable in either a legal or equitable suit and whose suit can be identified based upon the nature of relief. In doing so, Roberts noted that the SEC's imposition of monetary relief penalties as a form of punishment were 'legal in nature' and therefore typical of common law remedies, as only courts of law were able to apply them as punishments, while monetary relief penalties to restore the status quo were instead considered to be an 'equitable form of relief'. Therefore, civil penalties as punishment, such as those imposed by the SEC, were a type of common law remedy enforceable by the courts as they were 'legal in nature' and permitted the right to a jury trial. Roberts would further contend that the right to a jury trial was validated as the nature of the SEC's enforcement action stood in line with private rights which followed the 'traditional actions at common law tried by the courts at Westminster in 1789' and not a public right that would not require a jury trial. In distinguishing the SEC's claims as a private right from a public right, Roberts emphasized past precedent in Granfinanciera, S.A. v. Nordberg, which determined there to be no public exception for a bankruptcy proceeding to recover a fraudulent conveyance in spite of such actions being validated by a statutory reading. In closing his opinion, Roberts noted that congressional assignment of action could not supersede substance of the action itself, or it would "[permit the risk for] Congress to siphon this action away from an Article III court".

=== Dissent ===
Justice Sonia Sotomayor wrote the dissent joined by Justices Elena Kagan and Ketanji Brown Jackson. Sotomayor called the majority decision "a devastating blow to the manner in which our government functions", as the majority did not apply the long-standing public rights doctrine of Atlas Roofing Co. v. OSHRC (1977). When Congress creates a public right enforced by the federal government, it can "assign the matter for decision to an agency without a jury, consistent with the Seventh Amendment." The majority's ruling, Sotomayor argued, would create confusion around how public and private rights should be handled.

== Impact ==
At the end of March 2022, the SEC only had seven pending administrative enforcement actions in front of its three ALJs. Legal experts believe Jarkesy is the first case that has held an administrative enforcement action brought to its ALJ must be tried by a jury. Since Jarkesy, at least three lawsuits have been filed claiming that the United States Department of Labor's administrative proceedings for enforcing anti-discrimination requirements for federal contractors are unconstitutional.

A 2025 study found that the United States Department of Agriculture sharply reduced their use of civil penalties after SEC v. Jarkesy, shifting toward official warnings for Animal Welfare Act violations. This has resulted in repeat violators facing little more than nonbinding notices rather than monetary sanctions. The extent to which the decision properly limits agencies’ enforcement authority remains unsettled, and some analysts, such as Delcianna Winders of the Animal Law and Policy Institute at Vermont Law and Graduate School, argue that it should not extend to such matters because they involve modern administrative public-rights regimes rather than the common-law claims implicated in Jarkesy.

The Supreme Court addressed the jury trial right next in FCC v. AT&T Inc..
