= Free Enterprise Fund v. Public Company Accounting Oversight Board =

- Supreme Court of the United States

Argued December 7, 2009 Decided June 28, 2010
- Full case name: Free Enterprise Fund and Beckstead and Watts, LLP v. Public Company Accounting Oversight Board, et al.
- Docket no.: 08-861
- Citations: 561 U.S. 477 (more) 130 S. Ct. 3138; 177 L. Ed. 2d 706

Case history
- Prior: Judgment for defendants affirmed, 537 F.3d 667 (D.C. Cir. 2008), cert. granted, 556 U.S. 1234 (2009).

Holding
- The dual for-cause limitations on the removal of members of the Public Company Accounting Oversight Board contravene the Constitution's separation of powers, but the unconstitutional limitations are severable from the remainder of the statute. The Board's appointment is consistent with the Appointments clause.

Court membership
- Chief Justice John Roberts Associate Justices John P. Stevens · Antonin Scalia; Anthony Kennedy · Clarence Thomas; Ruth Bader Ginsburg · Stephen Breyer; Samuel Alito · Sonia Sotomayor

Case opinions
- Majority: Roberts, joined by Scalia, Kennedy, Thomas, Alito
- Dissent: Breyer, joined by Stevens, Ginsburg, Sotomayor

Laws applied
- U.S. const., art. II

Free Enterprise Fund v. Public Company Accounting Oversight Board, 561 U.S. 477 (2010), United States Supreme Court case in which the Court ruled that laws enabling inferior officers of the United States to be insulated from the Presidential removal authority with two levels of "for cause" removal violated Article Two of the United States Constitution.

Under the Sarbanes–Oxley Act, officers of the Public Company Accounting Oversight Board could be removed only "for good cause shown" by officers of the Securities and Exchange Commission (SEC). Officers of the SEC could only be removed by the President for "inefficiency, neglect of duty, or malfeasance in office." Thus, although the President could remove high-ranking members of the SEC, he could not govern and execute power to the board, thus providing a "dual layer" of protection. The Court found this "dual layer" of protection "contrary to Article II's vesting of the executive power in the President."

== Background ==
=== Facts ===
The Public Company Accounting Oversight Board (PCAOB) was created as part of a series of accounting reforms in the Sarbanes–Oxley Act of 2002. It is composed of five members appointed to five-year staggered terms by the Securities and Exchange Commission. Because the Board was created as a private nonprofit organization, "Board members and employees are not considered government 'officer[s] or employee[s]' for statutory purposes." Every accounting firm that audits public companies under the securities laws must register with the Board, pay it an annual fee, and comply with its rules and oversight, among other things.

In February 2006, the Free Enterprise Fund and Beckstead and Watts, LLP (a small Nevada-based accounting firm) filed a lawsuit in federal court challenging the constitutionality of the PCAOB under the Appointments Clause of the U.S. Constitution and the vesting clauses establishing the separation of powers. On August 22, 2008, the U.S. Court of Appeals for the District of Columbia Circuit upheld the PCAOB as constitutional. Then-Judge Brett Kavanaugh dissented from that opinion.

== Supreme Court ==
=== Opinion of the Court ===
On June 28, 2010, in a majority opinion written by Chief Justice John G. Roberts, a divided Supreme Court found the appointment provisions of the Act to be constitutional, but struck down the for-cause removal provision. Roberts first cited the Decision of 1789 as demonstrating the First Congress overwhelmingly believed that "the executive power included a power to oversee executive officers through removal." He then effectively revived Myers v. United States as precedent by citing it as an reaffirmation of "the principle that Article II confers on the President 'the general administrative control of those executing the laws."

Roberts distinguished the case at hand from Humphrey's Executor v. United States (1935) because Humphrey's dealt with principal officers. He then distinguished the case from Morrison v. Olson (1988) because "Morrison did not . . . address the consequences of more than one level of good-cause tenure" which "makes a difference." If the Commission is responsible "only for their own determination of whether the Act's rigorous good-cause standard is met [...] neither the President, nor anyone directly responsible to him, nor even an officer whose conduct he may review only for good cause, has full control over the Board." The Court said this structure "was contrary to Article II's vesting of the executive power in the President."

After finding the "for cause" provision to be unconstitutional, the Court held that the PCAOB board members were inferior officers because the SEC could remove them at will. Further, it held that because "the Commission is a freestanding component of the Executive Branch, not subordinate to or contained within any other such component, it constitutes a 'Departmen[t]' for the purposes of the Appointments Clause", settling a question raised in Freytag v. Commissioner.

The Court did not accept petitioners' argument that the constitutional infirmity made all of the Board's prior activity unconstitutional; rather, it simply severed the for-cause removal clause from the rest of Sarbanes-Oxley, leaving the Board itself intact.

=== Breyer's Dissent ===
Justice Breyer wrote a dissenting opinion, joined by justices Stevens, Ginsburg and Sotomayor. The dissent opened with a general description of the clashing constitutional interests, matching the court's discussion of presidential duty in supervising the executive branch, with its own expansion on congress’ responsibility in creating government ‘offices’ in a manner befitting the times. While nodding to the general premise that the president has authority to appoint and at times dismiss officials, the dissent argued that the authority isn’t absolute. The dissent cited Humphrey’s Executor as precedent backing their assertion, and characterized it as a ‘partial overruling’ of the court’s cornerstone Myers. The dissent emphasized the absence of presidential removal power in the constitution and narrated some of the historical controversy regarding the issue.

Next the dissent argued for adopting a functional framework for deciding the question. The constitution, according to the dissent, was written in a broad manner in order to be read and applied in face of unforeseeable exigencies and necessary expansions of the federal government. Therefore the exact power or extent of authority of any branch should not be based “on isolated clauses or even single Articles torn from context”.

According to the dissent, the functional consequences of the 'for-cause' provision don’t amount to a significant contravention of the president's ability to supervise the executive branch. The dissent drew forth a few arguments to back its assertion. First, the Sarbanes-Oxley Act was passed virtually unanimously in congress, and was not critiqued by the president on grounds of separation of powers concerns. That should suggest that neither the president nor the legislator, the more expert branches in administrative knowledge, perceived the act to contain an insult to constitutional principles. Next, as a practical matter, removal authority is only one of many ways by which a president can exert supervision over the executive, and a rarely used one in actual fact. Next again, in view of the fact that the commissioner himself is protected by a ‘for cause’ requirement, the president isn’t left any worse off by the ‘for-cause’ provision than he was pre-enactment. The scenario the court comes up with to the contrary, namely, that the commissioner and president agree that a board member need be removed, but don’t agree on the presence of ‘good-cause’, the dissent deemed very unlikely. And lastly, even if removal is limited only ‘for-cause’, the SEC still controls the functioning of the board in many other ways, and so by the court’s logic, so does the president.

Weighing against the constitutional indifference to the ‘for-cause’ provision, the dissent argued for good reason for the provision’s enactment. That is, protecting the independence of officers who partake in adjudication and the need for technical expertise in matters of accounting. The dissent pointed to previous cases of the supreme court that, in the dissent’s framing, support upholding ‘for-cause’ removal provisions when they are unlikely to significantly restrict presidential power. The only case striking down a ‘for-cause’ provision, Myers, was distinguished on separation-of-power grounds: there congress was drawing power to itself, here congress wasn’t.

With regards to the consequences of the ruling, the dissent warned that the scope of the decision is alarmingly wide, especially when taking into account the indefiniteness of the term “inferior officer”. The dissent turned to listing some of the affected positions and overall found “no way to avoid sweeping hundreds, perhaps thousands of high level government officials within the scope of the Court’s holding, putting their job security and their administrative actions and decisions constitutionally at risk.”

Finally, the dissent criticized the court for simply assuming a ‘for-cause’ prerequisite for removing the Commissioner, and then building on that assumption to strike down a statute. According to the dissent, the absence of a ‘for-cause’ requirement in the Securities Exchange Act of 1934, and the time-period within which it was enacted, suggest that no such provision was intended.

== See also ==
- Bowsher v. Synar
- Myers v. United States
- Morrison v. Olson
- Seila Law LLC v. Consumer Financial Protection Bureau
- The Decision of 1789
