= Axon Enterprise, Inc. v. Federal Trade Commission =

- Supreme Court of the United States

Argued November 7, 2022 Decided April 14, 2023
- Full case name: Axon Enterprise, Inc. v. Federal Trade Commission, et al. Securities and Exchange Commission, et al. v. Michelle Cochran
- Docket nos.: 21-86; 21-1239
- Citations: 598 U.S. 175 (more)
- Argument: Oral argument
- Opinion announcement: Opinion announcement

Questions presented
- 1. Whether Congress implicitly stripped federal district courts of jurisdiction over constitutional challenges to the Federal Trade Commission's structure, procedures, and existence by granting the courts of appeals jurisdiction to "affirm, enforce, modify, or set aside" the Commission's cease-and-desist orders.; 2. Whether a federal district court has jurisdiction to hear a suit in which the respondent in an ongoing Securities and Exchange Commission administrative proceeding seeks to enjoin that proceeding, based on an alleged constitutional defect in the statutory provisions that govern the removal of the administrative law judge who will conduct the proceeding.

Holding
- The statutory review schemes set out in the Securities Exchange Act and Federal Trade Commission Act do not displace a district court's federal-question jurisdiction over claims challenging as unconstitutional the structure or existence of the SEC or FTC.

Court membership
- Chief Justice John Roberts Associate Justices Clarence Thomas · Samuel Alito; Sonia Sotomayor · Elena Kagan; Neil Gorsuch · Brett Kavanaugh; Amy Coney Barrett · Ketanji Brown Jackson

Case opinions
- Majority: Kagan, joined by Roberts, Thomas, Alito, Sotomayor, Kavanaugh, Barrett, Jackson
- Concurrence: Thomas
- Concurrence: Gorsuch (in judgment)

Laws applied
- Federal Trade Commission Act of 1914; Securities Exchange Act of 1934

Axon Enterprise, Inc. v. Federal Trade Commission, 598 U.S. 175 (2023), was a United States Supreme Court case in which the court held that the statutory review schemes set out in the Securities Exchange Act of 1934 and Federal Trade Commission Act of 1914 do not displace a district court's federal-question jurisdiction over claims challenging as unconstitutional the structure or existence of the SEC or FTC.

== Background ==
=== Axon Enterprise v. FTC ===
Axon Enterprise manufactures Tasers and police-worn body cameras. In May 2018, Axon purchased its competitor in the body camera market, Vievu LLC, for $13 million. The Federal Trade Commission soon began an antitrust investigation into Axon. The company offered to settle, but the FTC declined. In January 2020, Axon filed a lawsuit in the United States District Court for the District of Arizona, challenging the constitutionality of FTC's structure. The district court dismissed the case, holding that federal law stripped it of jurisdiction to consider constitutional claims against the FTC while proceedings were underway. The United States Court of Appeals for the Ninth Circuit affirmed in a 2–1 vote. Judge Patrick J. Bumatay dissented. Axon Enterprise then filed a petition for a writ of certiorari with the Supreme Court in July 2021, which was subsequently granted in January 2022.

=== SEC v. Cochran ===
The Securities and Exchange Commission brought an enforcement against Michelle Cochran, a certified public accountant, in April 2016 for failure to comply with the auditing standards of the Public Company Accounting Oversight Board. After a hearing before the SEC's internal administrative law judges, the SEC imposed a fine and banned her from practicing before the SEC. While the case was still pending, the Supreme Court entered its ruling in Lucia v. SEC which held the SEC's ALJs must be appointed in accordance with the Appointments Clause. In response, the SEC reassigned Cochran's case to a new ALJ. In January 2018, Cochran filed a lawsuit in the United States District Court for the Northern District of Texas, challenging the constitutionality of the SEC's structure. The district court dismissed the case, holding federal law stripped it of jurisdiction to consider constitutional claims against the SEC while proceedings were underway. The United States Court of Appeals for the Fifth Circuit affirmed in a 2–1 vote. In a divided opinion, the Fifth Circuit sitting en banc reversed the decision, holding the district court had jurisdiction to hear the claim. The SEC then filed a petition for a writ of certiorari with the Supreme Court in March 2022, which was subsequently granted in May 2022.

== Arguments ==
The issue argued by the parties was whether the language of the FTC Act (and Exchange Act) precludes district court jurisdiction over Axon and Cochran's claims. And even if it does, Axon and Cochran's claims fall outside the acts' statutory schemes of jurisdiction and, therefore, are subject to district court jurisdiction regardless.

In discerning whether a claim falls outside a statute's review provision, the court in Thunder Basin Coal v. Reich set forth a three-factor test; courts must survey whether the claim enjoys meaningful review under the statute, whether the claim is 'wholly collateral' to the review scheme, and whether the claim is outside the agency's expertise. The arguments presented in the briefs and oral arguments mostly pertained to the language of the acts and the bearing of the Thunder Basin factors on the claims at hand.

The government argued that the detailed and comprehensive character of the FTC and Exchange Acts' review schemes instructs the courts that the jurisdiction provided in those schemes is exclusive. Those schemes provide jurisdiction to appellate courts over final agency orders (cease and desist orders in the FTC Act), and so the government contended - the exhaustivity of the schemes implicitly precludes district courts jurisdiction and any jurisdiction over matters mid-proceeding. The government cited the APA as concurrently stating that only final agency action is reviewable by courts. Axon and Cochran argued that the FTC and Exchange Acts cannot be construed as limiting jurisdiction, because the district courts were granted original jurisdiction over constitutional claims; jurisdiction traditionally left intact unless expressly stripped away. Axon resisted the government's inference, stressing that the FTC and Exchange Acts only ever expressly grant jurisdiction and never expressly limit it. As to the APA, Axon and Cochran argued that the act only applies when the administrative regime provides adequate relief which it does not for the claims at hand.

Axon and Cochran further argued that Thunder Basin works in their favor. First, they contested that the acts' review schemes do not afford any avenue for a meaningful review of their claims. An appeal after culmination of agency action offers no remedy for their 'here-and-now' injury of being subjected to an unconstitutional process. Next they argued that their claims are 'wholly collateral' to the review schemes, as their claims are aimed at the very existence and structure of the agencies. And third they argued that the agencies do not have the expertise needed to review their claims, no level of qualification in antitrust administrative law is of use in deciding constitutional questions. What is more, no agency has the authority to declare itself unconstitutional, all the more so in this case where the provision in question is not even a part of the FTC Act.

The government, in turn, disputed Axon and Cochran's analysis of the Thunder Basin factors. With regard to the first factor, the government stressed that all parts of an agency's proceeding are reviewable in an appellate court. Answering Axon's 'here-and-now' injury claim, the government cited the FTC v. Standard Oil holding that "[m]ere litigation expense, even substantial and unrecoupable cost, does not constitute irreparable injury." Next the government attacked the purported collateralness, pressing that Axon's claims did not arise 'outside' the administrative enforcement scheme but as an integral part of it; real 'collateral' claims are claims such as immunity, which attack the legitimacy of the proceedings' commencement itself. As for the lack of expertise claims, the government contended that constitutional review might be avoided altogether if the reviewer wins at the agency level. Therefore, premature review in the district court is ill-advised as a matter of constitutional avoidance. The government gave further premonition: allowing for mid-proceeding appeals "would also burden reviewing courts, requiring them to engage in piecemeal review and to decide issues whose resolution might prove to have been unnecessary upon completion of the agency proceeding".

The case's similarity to previous Supreme Court precedent prompted much comparing and contrasting by both sides, especially with regards to Free Enterprise Fund v. Public Company Accounting Oversight Board. Axon and Cochran described Free Enterprise Fund as nearly analogous to this case, in that both involve claims "go[ing] to the very existence of the agency... wholly collateral to the merits of any acquisition... beyond the competence of the agency. And [that in both] the agency is not in a position to provide meaningful relief." The government, however, emphasized that in Free Enterprise Fund the constitutional objections were directed at the PCAOB investigations, not the agency, and were granted review by district courts precisely because they were not agency proceedings reviewable under the review position. Moreover, much weight was given in Free Enterprise Fund to the fact that petitioners would need to incur penalty upon themselves in order to enter appealable agency proceedings, here on the other hand, Axon and Cochran were already subject to agency proceedings.

== Supreme Court ==
The Supreme Court granted certiorari in Axon's appeal on January 24, 2022. On May 16, 2022, it subsequently granted certiorari in Cochran's case, as both agencies' statutes have similar language. Oral arguments were held separately on November 7, 2022. On April 14, 2023, the Court reversed the Ninth Circuit and affirmed the Fifth Circuit, siding with the challengers in both cases, ruling that they could bring suit in federal court. Justice Elena Kagan wrote the majority opinion for herself and seven other justices; Justice Clarence Thomas concurred, and Justice Neil Gorsuch concurred only in the judgment.
