= Edmond v. United States =

1997 United States Supreme Court case

- Supreme Court of the United States

Argued February 24, 1997 Decided May 19, 1997
- Full case name: Jon E. Edmond v. United States
- Docket no.: 96-262
- Citations: 520 U.S. 651 (more) 117 S. Ct. 1573; 137 L. Ed. 2d 917

Holding
- Inferior officers are those who are supervised and subject to termination by principal officers, that is, those officers appointed by the President with the consent of the Senate.

Court membership
- Chief Justice William Rehnquist Associate Justices John P. Stevens · Sandra Day O'Connor; Antonin Scalia · Anthony Kennedy; David Souter · Clarence Thomas; Ruth Bader Ginsburg · Stephen Breyer

Case opinions
- Majority: Scalia, joined by Rehnquist, Stevens, O'Connor, Kennedy, Thomas, Ginsburg, Breyer; Souter (Parts I and II)
- Concurrence: Souter (in part)

Laws applied
- U.S. Const., Art. II, §2, cl. 2

Edmond v. United States, 520 U.S. 651 (1997), was a decision by the Supreme Court of the United States in which it held that members of the Coast Guard Court of Criminal Appeals were "inferior officers" under the Appointments Clause. The court also sought out to define "inferior officers", and generally held that inferior officers were those whose decisions could be reviewed by, and could be removed without cause by, a principal officer who is appointed by the President and confirmed by the Senate.

== Historical context ==
This case arose from six convictions which were all affirmed by the Coast Guard Court of Criminal Appeals and U.S. Court of Appeals for the Armed Forces, in which either one or two civilian judges served on the panel for the former. The six cases—Lazenby v. United States, Leaver v. United States, Leonard v. United States, Nichols v. United States, Venable v. United States, and Edmond v. United States—were all consolidated into Edmond v. United States due to the similarities in their reasons for appeal, all generally being on the basis of the recent decision of Ryder v. United States.

The reason for appeal were all generally on the basis that the appointment of the civilian judges to the Coast Guard court of appeals was unconstitutional because, (1) 49 U.S. Code § 323 (which formally applied to the Coast Guard), does not specifically give the Secretary of Transportation the authority to appoint Coast Guard judges, and, (2) judges of the military courts of appeals are principal, and not inferior officers.

== Supreme Court decision ==
The Supreme Court held oral arguments on February 24, 1997, and released its decision on May 19, 1997. In a unanimous decision, with Associate Justice Antonin Scalia writing for the court, the court held that the civilian judge's appointments by the Secretary of Transportation were constitutional, and that under the appointments clause, the judges of the Coast Guard court of appeals were "inferior officers".

The Court first tackled the history of the appointment of the judges, in which in a previous case, Weiss v. United States, held that military judges were considered "officers of the United States" and thus had to be appointed pursuant to the Appointments Clause, but upheld the assignment of the judges in that case because the judges had already been commissioned as active duty officers. In preparation of that decision, Chief Judge Joseph H. Baum requested that Secretary of Transportation Federico Peña formally reappoint the two civilian judges on the court so they would be constitutionally sound. In the Ryder case, the Supreme Court earlier overturned the conviction of a service member because the civilian members of the court were appointed unconstitutionally, and this case appeared to have tried to build on that same argument.

The court, however, disagreed with the Petitioner's first point, in that the Secretary of Transportation did not have the authority to appoint military judges. This resting on the fact that Article 66 of the Uniform Code of Military Justice—which the petitioner argued gave the Judge Advocate General of the Coast Guard the power of appointment—merely allows the Coast Guard JAG to assign officers and civilians to the court, and not appoint them.

In conclusion, the Court's opinion can be summarized as follows,

"We do not dispute that military appellate judges are charged with exercising significant authority on behalf of the United States. The exercise of "significant authority pursuant to the laws of the United States" marks, not the line between principal and inferior officer for Appointments Clause purposes, but rather..the line between officer and nonofficer."

"Generally speaking, the term "inferior officer" connotes a relationship with some higher-ranking officer or officers below the President: Whether one is an "inferior" officer depends on whether he has a superior...we think it evident that "inferior officers" are officers whose work is directed and supervised at some level by others who were appointed by Presidential nomination with the advice and consent of the Senate."

"Supervision of the work of Court of Criminal Appeals judges is divided between the Judge Advocate General (who in the Coast Guard is subordinate to the Secretary of Transportation) and the Court of Appeals for the Armed Forces. The Judge Advocate General exercises administrative oversight over the Court of Criminal Appeals."

"It is conceded by the parties that the Judge Advocate General may also remove a Court of Criminal Appeals judge from his judicial assignment without cause. The power to remove officers, we have recognized, is a powerful tool for control."

"What is significant is that the judges of the Court of Criminal Appeals have no power to render a final decision on behalf of the United States unless permitted to do so by other Executive officers."
