= Rathbun v. United States =

Rathbun v. United States may refer to:

- Rathbun v. United States (1957), 355 U.S. 107 (1957), on recording telephone conversations
- Humphrey's Executor v. United States, 295 U.S. 602 (1935), docket title Rathbun, Executor v. United States, on presidential power to remove certain officials
