= Special Division =

Special judicial panel

The Special Division was a division of the United States Court of Appeals for the District of Columbia Circuit. 28 U.S.C. § 49 (1982 ed., Supp. V) (Title VI of the Ethics in Government Act). It consisted of three circuit court judges or justices appointed by the Chief Justice of the United States. One of the judges must have been a judge of the DC Circuit, and no two of the judges may have been named to the Special Division from a particular court. The judges were appointed for 2-year terms, with any vacancy being filled only for the remainder of the 2-year period. Its constitutionality was upheld in Morrison v. Olson. Authority for the Court expired in 1999 under a sunset provision.

On December 19, 1986, Lawrence Walsh was appointed Independent Counsel for Iran/Contra Matters by the Special Division.
