= Ray Lucia =

American businessman (born 1950)

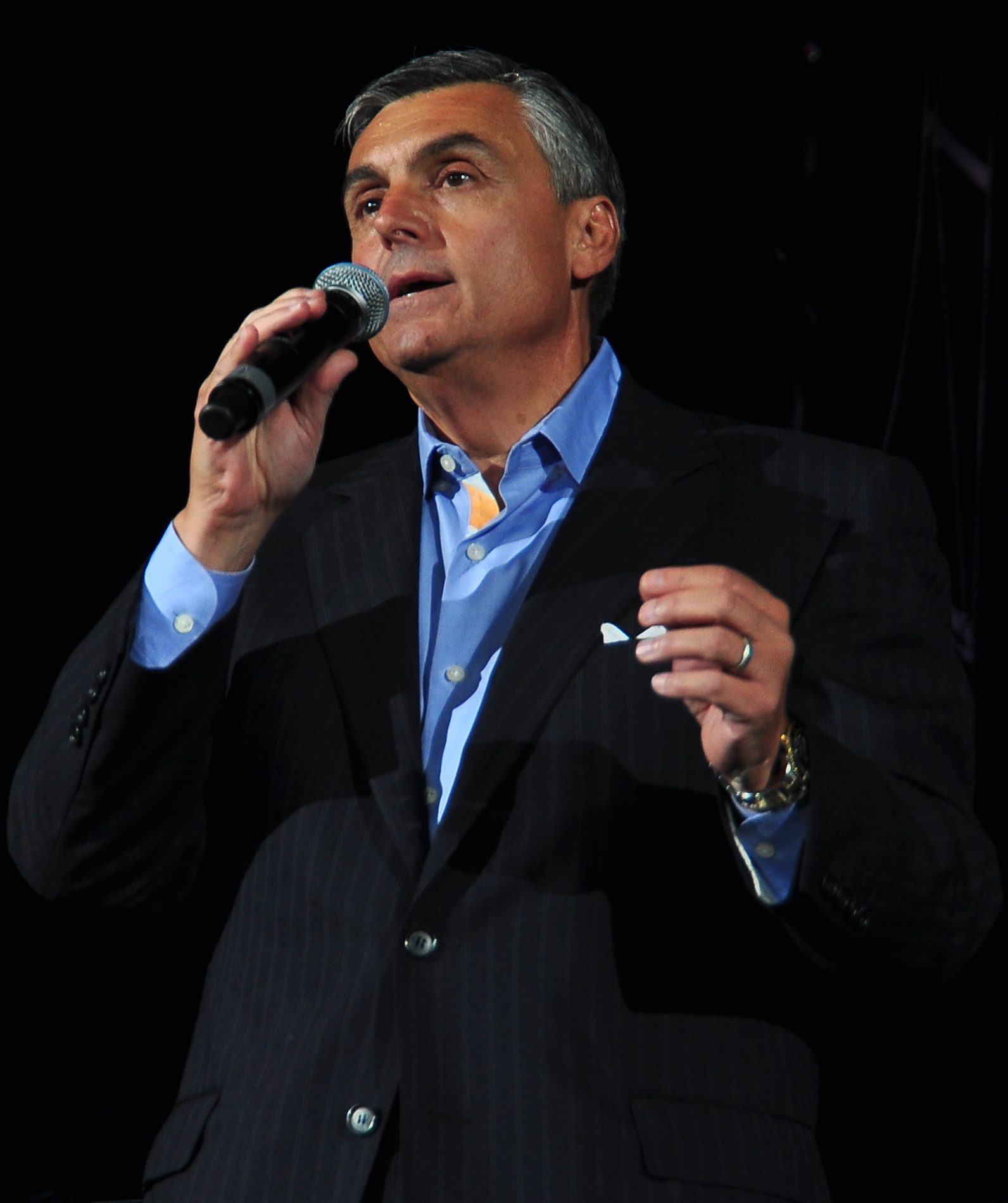
- Lucia speaking at Sean Hannity's Freedom Concert in San Diego, California, August 28, 2010.
- Born: April 3, 1950 (age 76); Philadelphia, Pennsylvania
- Citizenship: American
- Occupations: Certified Financial Planner, Registered Investment Advisor, author, radio personality television host
- Known for: The Ray Lucia Show
- Spouse: Jeanne Lucia
- Website: www.RayLucia.com

Raymond Joseph Lucia, Sr. is an American former Certified Financial Planner, former Registered Investment Advisor, author, radio personality and television host. He is host of The Ray Lucia Show, a nationally syndicated radio and television financial talk show on the Business Talk Radio Network and the Biz Television network.

On July 8, 2013, the U.S. Securities and Exchange Commission (SEC) barred Lucia from associating with any investment adviser, broker, or dealer, revoked his license and that of his former firm, and imposed civil penalties of $50,000 on Lucia and $250,000 on the firm. On June 16, 2020, Lucia reached a settlement with the SEC, agreed to pay a reduced civil penalty of $25,000, and was granted immediate eligibility to reapply for association with registered securities entities.

== Early life, education, personal life ==
Lucia was born in Philadelphia, Pennsylvania. His family moved to Poway, California when Lucia was ten years old. He went to Palomar College on a football scholarship and earned a teaching degree. Before becoming a financial advisor, Lucia was a high school teacher and football coach, and also played guitar and sang in a rock band. Lucia and his wife have four children.

== Career ==
Lucia founded the Raymond J. Lucia Companies, Inc. and was the company's president and CEO for over twenty years. Registered Rep Magazine named Lucia as one of the "Top 100 Independent Financial Advisors in America" in 2008, and he was one of ten financial advisors recognized in the magazine's 2004 "Outstanding Broker Awards."

On September 5, 2012, the SEC alleged that Ray Lucia spread misleading information about his Buckets of Money strategy at a series of investment seminars. Lucia had assured investors that his strategies had been backtested during bear markets. The SEC contended that the only backtesting Lucia performed were some "calculations made in the late 1990s and two two-page spreadsheets."

On July 9, 2013, an administrative judge ordered Lucia to pay $50,000, finding that Lucia's claims that his strategy had been empirically backtested were false. The administrative judge barred Lucia from associating with any investment advisor or broker, stripped Raymond J. Lucia Companies Inc. of its investment adviser registration, and fined the company US$300,000. Lucia appealed the decision, arguing that the administrative judge position within the SEC was an officer of the United States which required appointment to the position, and argued that the SEC's current judge was not properly appointed. The SEC and the District Court rejected Lucia's argument, leading him to petition to the United States Supreme Court by mid-2017.

== Supreme Court case and policy impact ==
Lucia's appeal reached the Supreme Court, which heard the case as Lucia v. SEC. On June 21, 2018, the Court ruled 7-2 in Lucia's favor, holding that SEC administrative law judges are subject to the Constitution's Appointments Clause and must be appointed by the President or delegated officers, rather than hired through standard civil service procedures. The Court reversed the previous judgments and remanded the case for a new hearing before a properly-appointed administrative law judge.

Following the Supreme Court's decision, President Donald Trump issued Executive Order 13843 on July 10, 2018. The order cited the Lucia decision and moved approximately 1,900 federal administrative law judges from the competitive civil service to a new excepted service classification, allowing agency heads to directly appoint them.

On June 16, 2020, Lucia reached a settlement with the SEC in which he neither admitted nor denied wrongdoing. He agreed to pay a civil penalty of $25,000 and was granted immediate eligibility to reapply for association with registered securities entities.

== Writing ==
Lucia is author of three books focusing on retirement investment strategies, with co-author Dale Fetherling:

- The Buckets of Money Retirement Solution: The Ultimate Guide to Income for Life (2010) (foreword by Ben Stein)
- Ready... Set... Retire! Financial Strategies for the Rest of Your Life (2007)
- Buckets of Money: How To Retire in Comfort and Safety (2004)

== Radio and television ==
In 1990, The Ray Lucia Show began airing on radio station KFMB (AM) in San Diego. From 2000 to 2011, the show was nationally syndicated on the Business Talk Radio Network. Currently it can be heard on the Global American Broadcasting Network In 2009, Talkers Magazine named Lucia as one of the "100 Most Important Radio Talk Show Hosts in America." Lucia is also a frequent guest on the Sean Hannity Show. In September 2010 The Ray Lucia Show was picked up for television by the Biz Television Network. In addition to his own show, Lucia has appeared on ABC's Good Morning America, Fox News Channel's Your World With Neil Cavuto and The Cost of Freedom and CNBC's On The Money. Lucia announced in June 2019 that he is retiring from broadcasting. His June 28 program will be his last.
