= 2025 term United States Supreme Court opinions of John Roberts =

The 2025 term of the Supreme Court of the United States began October 6, 2025, and will conclude October, 2026. This is the twenty-first term of Chief Justice John Roberts's tenure on the Court.
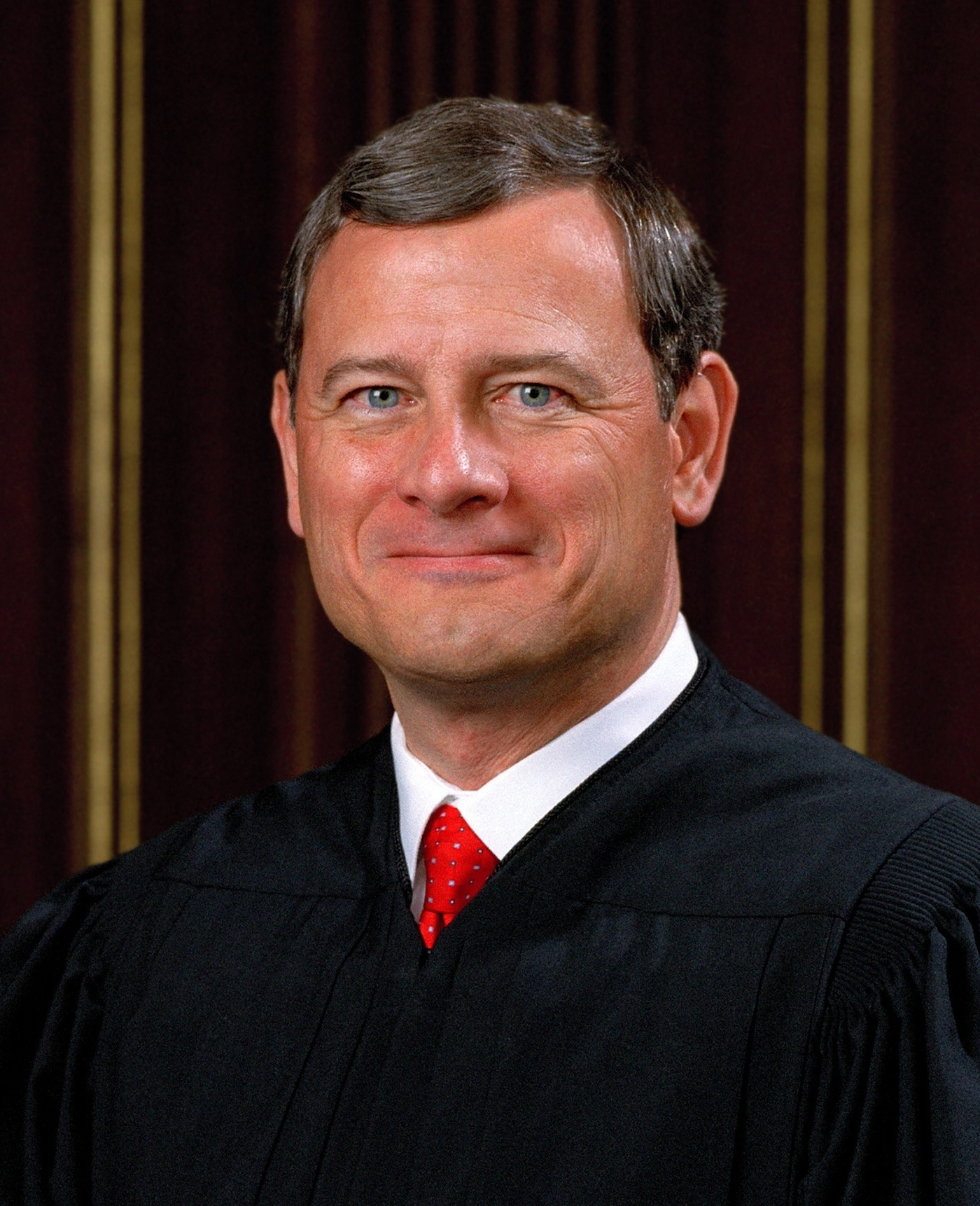

John Roberts 2025 term statistics (in progress)

3	Majority or plurality	0	Concurrence	0	Other
0	Dissent	0	Concurrence/dissent	Total =	3
Bench opinions = 3		Opinions relating to orders = 0		In-chambers opinions = 0
Unanimous opinions: 0		Most joined by: -		Least joined by: -

Type	Case	Citation	Issues	Joined by	Other opinions
	Bost v. Illinois State Board of Elections	607 U.S. 71 (2026)		Thomas, Alito, Gorsuch, Kavanaugh	Barrett; Jackson
	Learning Resources, Inc. v. Trump	607 U.S. 229 (2026)			
	FCC v. AT&T Inc. (2026)	607 U.S. 71 (2026)			Thomas
