= Myers v. United States =

- Supreme Court of the United States

Argued December 5, 1923 Reargued April 13–14, 1925 Decided October 25, 1926
- Full case name: Frank S. Myers, Administratrix v. United States
- Citations: 272 U.S. 52 (more) 47 S. Ct. 21; 71 L. Ed. 160; 1926 U.S. LEXIS 35

Case history
- Prior: Appeal from the Court of Claims

Holding
- The President has the exclusive authority to remove "administrative officers" and the Take Care Clause generally limits Congress from restricting this power.

Court membership
- Chief Justice William H. Taft Associate Justices Oliver W. Holmes Jr. · Willis Van Devanter; James C. McReynolds · Louis Brandeis; George Sutherland · Pierce Butler; Edward T. Sanford · Harlan F. Stone

Case opinions
- Majority: Taft, joined by Van Devanter, Sutherland, Butler, Sanford, Stone
- Dissent: Holmes
- Dissent: McReynolds
- Dissent: Brandeis

Laws applied
- U.S. Const. art. II, § 2, cl. 2

Myers v. United States, 272 U.S. 52 (1926), was a United States Supreme Court decision ruling that the president's exclusive power to remove executive branch officials is vested in the Office of the Presidency by Article Two of the United States Constitution, and the Take Care Clause generally limits Congress from restricting this power.

Myers was the first Supreme Court case to invalidate a federal law for violating the separation of powers by allowing Congress to "participate in the exercise of [the removal power]". In dissent, Justices James Clark McReynolds and Louis Brandeis argued that the framers deliberately limited executive power and pointed to longstanding congressional restrictions on the President's removal authority that had received tacit acceptance from both the executive branch and the Supreme Court. The Taft Court's broad view of the president's "constitutional duty of seeing that the laws be faithfully executed" was soon thereafter limited in Humphrey's Executor v. United States (1935) to "purely executive" offices.

In Seila Law LLC v. Consumer Financial Protection Bureau (2020), the Roberts Court reaffirmed the core holding of Myers that the president generally has an unencumbered removal power.

== Background ==
After decades of political controversy surrounding the tenure of political appointees, the Supreme Court recognized the President's removal power as incidental to the Article II appointment power in a series of decisions beginning with Ex parte Hennen (1839). In Parsons v. United States (1897), the Court held that, absent a clear statutory restriction, the President's power to remove executive officers was implicit. The decision, however, left unresolved whether Congress could constitutionally require the Senate's advice and consent for removals.

An 1876 federal law provided that "Postmasters of the first, second, and third classes shall be appointed and may be removed by the President with the advice and consent of the Senate." Frank S. Myers served as first-class postmaster of Portland, Oregon until President Woodrow Wilson removed him from office in 1920 for reasons that were not publicly explained and without seeking the advice and consent of the Senate. Myers sued to recover his salary. He lost in the court of claims on the ground of laches. After Myers' death, his widow continued the litigation.

== Supreme Court ==
According to Justice Pierce Butler's notes the justices conferenced Myers on April 25, 1925. The justices appear to have agreed that the case should be decided on constitutional grounds. The Court held that the statute was unconstitutional, as it violated the separation of powers between the executive and the legislative branches. All told, it was one of the longest set of opinions in Supreme Court history up to that point.

=== Majority ===
Chief Justice and former president William Howard Taft, writing for the Court, first noted that, apart from the Impeachment Clause, the Constitution is silent on the removal of executive officers and that the subject received little discussion at the Constitutional Convention.

Taft found that the Virginia Plan proposed to vest in the Executive "all the executive powers of the Congress under the Convention". Some of the states remained wary of proposals for a unitary executive, and would not agree to ratification unless the Appointments Clause included an advice and consent requirement. Despite the Senate's express constitutional role in consenting to appointments and Congress's authority to establish executive offices, the Court recognized an implied presidential power to remove executive officers free from legislative restriction. Taft reasoned that the President's duty to faithfully execute the laws required authority to supervise executive officers, with the power of removal serving as the means of enforcing that supervision.

The Chief Justice gave little weight to the argument advanced by Senator Claude Pepper, appearing as amicus curiae, that recognizing an unrestricted presidential removal power would revive the spoils system. The Court responded that, under existing conditions, "the independent power of removal by the President alone ... works no practical interference with the merit system".

Taft finally analyzed subsequent congressional debates over the issue. He credited Montesquieu as the major intellectual influence for the separation of powers principle and concluded that "the reasonable construction of the Constitution must be that the branches should be kept separate in all cases in which they were not expressly blended". Taft cited historical evidence about Alexander Hamilton and the Neutrality Proclamation to argue that the Take Care Clause does not restrict or limit the "Executive Power" vested in the Office of the Presidency by Article II of the United States Constitution. He found that The Decision of 1789 weighed heavily in favor of an unencumbered removal power that "vested in the President alone".

Taft concluded that Article II "grants to the President" the "general administrative control of those executing the laws, including the power of appointment and removal of executive officers" that is needed to fulfill the Article II responsibility to "take care that the laws be faithfully executed".

=== Dissents ===
The dissenters warned that an unrestricted presidential removal power could undermine the civil service system by reviving the spoils system. They said that broad presidential removal authority might be appropriate for Cabinet officers but not for officials performing adjudicatory or quasi-judicial functions, such as members of the Interstate Commerce Commission and the Federal Trade Commission.

In a lengthy dissent, Justice McReynolds used an equally exhaustive analysis of quotes from members of the Constitutional Convention and, writing that he found no language in the Constitution or in the notes from the Convention intended to grant the president the "illimitable power" to fire every appointed government official "as caprice may suggest". McReynolds said an unchecked removal power had "brought the public service to a low estate and caused insistent demand for reform," citing Daniel Webster, Henry Clay, and John C. Calhoun on the "serious evils which followed the practice of dismissing civil officers as caprice or interest dictated."

In a separate dissent, Justice Brandeis wrote that the fundamental case deciding the power of the Supreme Court, Marbury v. Madison, "assumed, as the basis of decision, that the President, acting alone, is powerless to remove an inferior civil officer appointed for a fixed term with the consent of the Senate; and that case was long regarded as so deciding."

In a third dissent, Justice Holmes noted that it was within the power of Congress to abolish the position of Postmaster entirely, not to mention to set the position's pay and duties, and he had no problem believing Congress also ought to be able to set terms of the position's occupiers.

== Subsequent developments ==
In an interview with SCOTUSblog, law professor Stephen Vladeck said "there's language in Chief Justice Taft's majority opinion that for the first time opened the door to arguments that for-cause removal restrictions were generally unconstitutional."

In this well-known dictum, Taft endorsed the reasoning of Shurtleff v. United States (1903), in which the Court declined to limit the president’s general removal power in the absence of clear congressional intent. When confronted with the issue in Humphrey’s Executor v. United States, Justice George Sutherland concluded that Congress had intended to create an independent agency.

In 1935, in Humphrey's Executor the Supreme Court upheld a statute protecting the FTC Commissioner from politically motivated removal. Recognizing longstanding disputes over the removal power, Humphrey's distinguished executive officers from officers occupying "quasi-legislative" or "quasi-judicial" positions. The majority opinion stated that:

The office of a postmaster is so essentially unlike the office now involved that the decision in the Myers case cannot be accepted as controlling our decision here. A postmaster is an executive officer restricted to the performance of executive functions. He is charged with no duty at all related to either the legislative or judicial power. The actual decision in the Myers case finds support in the theory that such an officer is merely one of the units in the executive department and, hence, inherently subject to the exclusive and illimitable power of removal by the Chief Executive whose subordinate and aid he is. Putting aside dicta [...] the necessary reach of the decision goes far enough to include all purely executive officers.

In Wiener v. United States the Court said the Humphrey's decision "narrowly confined the scope of the Myers decision". The Court seemed to have stepped back from Taft's broad view of the president's "constitutional duty of seeing that the laws be faithfully executed".

Myers has regained prominence in the Roberts Court's separation of powers jurisprudence, and was described as a "landmark case" in Free Enterprise Fund v. PCAOB. Legal scholars have remarked that the Roberts Court does not appear inclined to limit the reach of Taft's opinion. Justice Elena Kagan, dissenting in Seila Law LLC v. Consumer Financial Protection Bureau (2020), emphasized that Morrison v. Olson had "confined Myers' reach, making clear that Congress could restrict the president's removal of officials carrying out even the most traditional executive functions."

== Works cited ==
- Bruff, Harold H. (1979). "Presidential Power and Administrative Rulemaking". The Yale Law Journal. 88 (3).
- Calabresi, Steven G.; Rhodes, Kevin H. (1992). "The Structural Constitution: Unitary Executive, Plural Judiciary". Harvard Law Review. 105 (6).
- Goldsmith, Jack Landman; Manning, John F. (2016). "The Protean Take Care Clause". University of Pennsylvania Law Review: 1836-1837. Archived from the original on January 6, 2017.
- Post, Robert (2020). "Tension in the Unitary Executive: How Taft Constructed the Epochal Opinion of Myers v. United States". Journal of Supreme Court History. 45 (2).

== See also ==
- Free Enterprise Fund v. Public Company Accounting Oversight Board
- List of United States Supreme Court cases, volume 272
