= Metropolitan Washington Airports Authority v. Citizens for Abatement of Aircraft Noise, Inc. =

- Supreme Court of the United States

Argued April 16, 1991 Decided June 17, 1991
- Full case name: Metropolitan Washington Airports Authority v. Citizens for Abatement of Aircraft Noise, Inc.
- Docket no.: 90-906
- Citations: 501 U.S. 252 (more)
- Argument: Oral argument

Holding
- Congress may not delegate the power to execute the law to agents subject to its control

Court membership
- Chief Justice William Rehnquist Associate Justices Byron White · Thurgood Marshall; Harry Blackmun · John P. Stevens; Sandra Day O'Connor · Antonin Scalia; Anthony Kennedy · David Souter

Case opinions
- Majority: Stevens, joined by Blackmun, O'Connor, Scalia, Kennedy, Souter
- Dissent: White, joined by Rehnquist, Marshall

Laws applied
- U.S. Const. art. II, § 2, cl. 2 U.S. Const. art. I, § 7, cl. 2 & 3

Metropolitan Washington Airports Authority v. Citizens for Abatement of Aircraft Noise, Inc., 501 U.S. 252 (1991), was a decision of the Supreme Court of the United States on the United States Constitution's separation of powers doctrine. The Court declared Congress may not vest executive power into agents subject to Congress's control.

== See also ==
- List of United States Supreme Court cases, volume 501
