= Morrison v. Olson =

- Supreme Court of the United States

Argued April 26, 1988 Decided June 29, 1988
- Full case name: Alexia Morrison, Independent Counsel v. Theodore Olson, et al.
- Citations: 487 U.S. 654 (more) 108 S. Ct. 2597; 101 L. Ed. 2d 569; 1988 U.S. LEXIS 3034; 56 U.S.L.W. 4835

Case history
- Prior: In re Sealed Case, 838 F.2d 476 (D.C. Cir. 1988); probable jurisdiction noted, 484 U.S. 1058 (1988).

Holding
- The Independent Counsel Act's restriction on the power of the Attorney General to remove an inferior officer only for good cause does not violate the Appointments Clause. The Independent Counsel Act is constitutional, as it does not increase the power of the judiciary or legislative branches at the expense of the executive branch.

Court membership
- Chief Justice William Rehnquist Associate Justices William J. Brennan Jr. · Byron White; Thurgood Marshall · Harry Blackmun; John P. Stevens · Sandra Day O'Connor; Antonin Scalia · Anthony Kennedy

Case opinions
- Majority: Rehnquist, joined by Brennan, White, Marshall, Blackmun, Stevens, O'Connor
- Dissent: Scalia
- Kennedy took no part in the consideration or decision of the case.

Laws applied
- U.S. Const. art. II

Morrison v. Olson, 487 U.S. 654 (1988), was a United States Supreme Court decision holding that the Ethics in Government Act was constitutional. It also set important precedent determining the scope of Congress's ability to encumber the president's authority to remove officers of the United States from office. In 2020, in the case Seila Law LLC v. Consumer Financial Protection Bureau, the Supreme Court distinguished Morrison as a narrow exception applying only to inferior officers.

== Background ==
The Ethics in Government Act was passed by Congress in 1978 after the Watergate scandal, including the Office of Independent Counsel. When needed, the statute allowed for an independent counsel to be appointed by a special judicial panel called the Special Division.

=== Reagan administration ===
In 1982, two subcommittees of the United States House of Representatives issued subpoenas that directed the Environmental Protection Agency (EPA) to produce documents relating to the efforts of the EPA and the Land and Natural Resources Division of the Justice Department to enforce the Superfund law. President Ronald Reagan ordered the Administrator of the EPA to withhold the documents on the grounds that they contained "enforcement sensitive information." This led to an investigation by the House Judiciary Committee that later produced a report suggesting that Theodore Olson, the Assistant Attorney General for the Office of Legal Counsel, had given false and misleading testimony before a House subcommittee during the early parts of the investigation.

The chairman of the Judiciary Committee forwarded a copy of the report to the Attorney General with a request that he seek the appointment of an independent counsel to investigate the allegations against Olson and two others. Alexia Morrison was named independent counsel and given jurisdiction to investigate whether Olson had violated federal law. Olson moved to quash the subpoenas and sued Morrison in her official capacity.

Olson argued that the Office of the Independent Counsel took executive powers away from the office of the president of the United States and created a hybrid "fourth branch" of government that was ultimately answerable to no one. He argued that the broad powers of an independent counsel could be easily abused or corrupted by partisanship. Morrison in turn argued that her position was necessary in order to prevent abuses by the executive branch, which historically operated in a closed environment.

== Supreme Court ==
The government's unitary executive theory argument mirrored Assistant Attorney General John Bolton's earlier congressional testimony that the Ethics in Government Act's independent counsel provisions were unconstitutional.

=== Majority ===
Chief Justice William Rehnquist, joined by Justices William J. Brennan Jr., Byron White, Thurgood Marshall, Harry Blackmun, John Paul Stevens, and Sandra Day O'Connor, called the unitary executive theory argument "more than the text will bear". He held that the independent counsel provision of the Ethics in Government Act did not violate the principle of separation of powers because it did not increase the power of one branch at the expense of another. He also chided the dissent's rigid application of separation of powers:

[This] rigid demarcation—a demarcation incapable of being altered by law in the slightest degree, and applicable to tens of thousands of holders of offices neither known nor foreseen by the framers—depends upon an extrapolation from general constitutional language which we think is more than the text will bear.

Though Rehnquist applied the structural principles of Humphrey's Executor v. United States (1935), he did not rely on that decision's reasoning. His opinion has been labelled "functionalist" by unitary executive theory supporters.

The Court had decided only two years earlier in Bowsher v. Synar that interpreting statutes to implement their requirements is "the very essence of 'execution' of the law". Reaffirming Bowsher's interpretation of the 1926 case Myers v. United States, Rehnquist allowed an exception for inferior officers, finding that an independent counsel appointed by the Special Division to investigate high-level misconduct would not "impermissibly burden" the president's responsibility under Article Two of the United States Constitution to "take care that the laws be faithfully executed".

=== Dissent ===
Justice Antonin Scalia, dissenting, said that the Ethics in Government Act should be struck down because criminal prosecution was an exercise of "purely executive power" and the law deprived the president of "exclusive control" of that power.

== Subsequent developments and legacy ==
Legal scholar Heidi Kitrosser criticized Scalia's Morrison dissent for portraying political accountability as a potential source of pressure that could corrupt legislators, while presenting presidential accountability in more favorable terms, a position central to unitary executive theory. She disputed his explanation that the distinction arose from the political difficulty of opposing or subsequently repealing legislation associated with government ethics.

Conservatives like Senator Bob Dole stated concerns similar to Scalia when independent counsel Lawrence Walsh announced the re-indictment of former Secretary of Defense Caspar Weinberger on charges related to the Iran–Contra affair four days before the 1992 U.S. presidential election. Critics also claimed the presence of partisan politics when Walsh's office reportedly leaked a note suggesting that President George H. W. Bush had lied about his connections to the affair. Concerns were also raised in line with Scalia's dissent when independent counsel Kenneth Starr spent $40 million and more than four years investigating President Clinton's land deals and extramarital affairs. Writing in The New York Times while Starr's work was ongoing, legal journalist Linda Greenhouse reported that Scalia's dissent, which she described as having been formerly disregarded by liberals, was instead being "cited and passed around in liberal circles like samizdat."

President Reagan's Solicitor General Charles Fried later reflected that the administration's decisive defeat in Morrison underscored the unitary executive theory's place outside the constitutional mainstream.

The part of the Ethics in Government Act at issue in Morrison, the Independent Counsel Act, expired in 1999. Then-Judge Samuel Alito said that the decision had hit the separation of powers doctrine "about as hard as heavy-weight champ Mike Tyson usually hits his opponents." Academic Jerry L. Mashaw stated that the decision had seemingly driven "a stake into the heart of" Myers v. United States, the controlling case on presidential removal powers at that time. In 2013, Scalia described Morrison as probably the most wrenching case in which he had participated:

Probably the most wrenching was Morrison v. Olson, which involved the independent counsel. To take away the power to prosecute from the president and give it to somebody who's not under his control is a terrible erosion of presidential power. And it was wrenching not only because it came out wrong—I was the sole dissenter—but because the opinion was written by Rehnquist, who had been head of the Office of Legal Counsel, before me, and who I thought would realize the importance of that power of the president to prosecute. And he not only wrote the opinion; he wrote it in a manner that was more extreme than I think Bill Brennan would have written it. That was wrenching."

In April 2006, the United States District Court for the District of Columbia rejected Scooter Libby's argument that Special Counsel Patrick Fitzgerald lacked the legal authority to bring charges against him, citing Morrison. Morrison was distinguished in 2020 in the Supreme Court case Seila Law LLC v. Consumer Financial Protection Bureau as being an exception to the president's generally unencumbered authority to remove officers of the United States at will. The Court held there that Morrison's holding was a narrow exception only applying to inferior officers.

== See also ==
- List of United States Supreme Court cases, volume 487
- List of United States Supreme Court cases
- Lists of United States Supreme Court cases by volume
- List of United States Supreme Court cases by the Rehnquist Court
