= Springer v. Government of the Philippine Islands =

- Supreme Court of the United States

Argued April 10, 1928 Decided May 14, 1928
- Full case name: Springer v. Government of the Philippine Islands
- Citations: 277 U.S. 189 (more)

Holding
- The legislative power does not include the power to appoint Executive Branch officers. Agents appointed by the Legislative Branch may not hold executive powers.

Court membership
- Chief Justice William H. Taft Associate Justices Oliver W. Holmes Jr. · Willis Van Devanter; James C. McReynolds · Louis Brandeis; George Sutherland · Pierce Butler; Edward T. Sanford · Harlan F. Stone

Case opinions
- Majority: Sutherland, joined by Taft, Devanter, Butler, Sanford, Stone
- Dissent: Holmes, joined by Brandeis
- Dissent: McReynolds

Laws applied
- U.S. Const. art. II, § 2, cl. 2

Springer v. Government of the Philippine Islands, 277 U.S. 189 (1928), was a decision of the United States Supreme Court concerning the Appointments Clause.

== Background ==
The case was an action of quo warranto, on behalf of the Government against Milton E. Springer, Dalamacio Costas, and Anselmo Hilario, the three directors of the National Coal Committee.

The Philippine Legislature established a coal company and a bank, with the government retaining majority ownership. This was enacted under Act No. 2705, which required the Governor-General to subscribe to fifty-one percent of the corporation's capital. Voting rights for this government-held stock were assigned to a Board of Control, composed of the Governor-General, the Speaker of the House of Representatives, and the President of the Senate. In a subsequent legal challenge, defendants contested the validity of Section 4 of Act No. 2705 as amended by Section 2 of Act No. 2822. The amendment explicitly vested the exclusive authority to vote on behalf of the Philippine Islands in this committee. These statutes collectively defined the powers and duties of the Board of Control.

== Supreme Court ==
=== Opinion of the Court ===
The Philippine Government, acting as the respondent, argued that selecting the directors and managers for a government-owned corporation by voting its government-owned shares is an executive power. This power, they contend, was granted to the Governor-General by the foundational Organic Act of the Philippine Islands.

The Organic Act of the Philippine Islands, enacted by the U.S. Congress in 1916, served as the foundational constitution for the Philippines. The Act established the structure of the Philippine government by separating powers among three distinct branches: legislative, executive and judicial. The Organic Act grants legislative power, but nothing in it suggests that when the legislature deals with the government's property rights, it can bypass the fundamental constitutional rule: it must perform legislative functions, not executive ones.

A core principle embedded in the Act was the separation of powers, particularly between the legislative and executive branches. A key provision stated that "all executive functions of the government must be directly under the Governor General or within one of the executive departments under the supervision and control of the Governor General." This clause was central to the legal dispute, as it was used to argue that the legislature could not constitutionally transfer executive functions—like voting government-owned stock—to a board controlled by legislative members. Specifically, the legislature must govern such property by establishing rules and policies (legislating), not by administering or executing those rules.

Therefore, the Philippine Government maintained that the subsequent acts of the Philippine Legislature—which removed this power from the Governor-General and transferred it to a "board" in one case and a "committee" in the other, both composed primarily of legislative officials—were invalid. The lower court agreed with the Government's position and ruled in its favor, issuing judgments to remove the petitioners from their positions in both cases.

Petitioners point to rare exceptions where Congress delegated governance of non-stock institutions (like the Smithsonian Institution) to boards containing legislators. The Court dismisses these as insufficient precedent. These cases are few in number and stand in stark contrast to the consistent practice Congress has followed with stock corporations owned or controlled by the government. In those standard cases, Congress has uniformly vested the power to vote government shares in an executive officer, never in its own members.

Section 4 of Act No. 2705, amended by Section 2 of Act No. 2822 was held to be invalid. The Philippine Legislature unlawfully determined who of its members sit on the committee, while still legally providing a National Coal Company. Appointments to positions lie in the Executive powers, not the Legislative.

=== Dissent ===
In a strong dissent, Oliver Wendell Holmes and Louis Brandeis protested: "The great ordinances of the Constitution do not establish and divide fields of black and white...It does not seem to need argument to show that however we may disguise it by veiling words we do not and cannot carry out the distinction between legislative and executive action with mathematical precision and divide the branches into watertight compartments, were it ever so desirable to do so, which I am far from believing that it is, or that the Constitution requires."
