= Decision of 1789 =

American constitutional debate

The Decision of 1789 refers to a month-long constitutional debate that occurred during the first session of the United States House of Representatives as to whether Article Two of the United States Constitution granted the president the power to remove officers of the United States at will. It has been called "the first significant legislative construction of the Constitution". The debate occurred after the proposed creation of three executive departments, the Department of the Treasury, Department of War, and Department of Foreign Affairs. Most of the debate focused on the proposal to create a Department of Foreign Affairs—the precursor to the Department of State—and which branch of government would have the power to remove officers from that department.

Congress ultimately enacted three departmental acts that contained similar language, none of which contained language expressly granting the President removal power, but instead discussed the custody of departmental papers after a department secretary "shall be removed from office by the President of the United States". Nonetheless, one of those acts included a proviso urged by James Madison that many scholars believe "was meant to imply recognition that the Secretary would be removable by the President at will". Justices of the Supreme Court and legal scholars continue to debate the legal significance of the decision. A traditional view held by many legal scholars is that the Decision conveyed a presidential power under the Constitution to remove officials. Alternatively, the view of other legal scholars is that there was no consensus on removal power or that evidence of a consensus is ambiguous.

== Theories on removal power ==
Four principal theories were advanced by members of the House regarding the proper authority to remove officers.

=== Executive power theory ===
The executive power theory stated that the President would have the power to remove executive officers unilaterally. The theory argued that because executive power was vested in the President under the Vesting Clause, and since removals of executive officials are executive functions, removal powers would fall under the authority of the President. It further reasoned that because exceptions to the executive power were enumerated in the Constitution, such as Senate concurrence with appointments, Congress is not empowered to modify executive authority on its own. A majority of Representatives favored the executive power theory, with its leading proponents including Madison, Fisher Ames, and John Vining. There was some debate within the coalition of executive power supporters over the wording of statutory language to convey an executive power to remove officials.

=== Congressional delegation theory ===
The congressional delegation theory argued that removal powers would need to be delegated by Congress in law. Under the theory, Congress would have the power to grant authority to remove officials under the Necessary and Proper Clause. It also reasoned that since Congress was implied to have the Constitutional power to create executive offices, it could set the terms of removal for its officials. Most supporters of the theory believed that it gave Congress a choice in delegating removal powers, while others believed it to be a formality, and that Congress was obliged to grant the President removal powers in statute. At least 7 Representatives voiced support for the theory and another 9 may have been "silent" supporters. Some Representatives who initially voiced support for the theory, including Madison, abandoned it due to the implications of Congress being able to delegate removal powers to anyone and possibly hindering the President's powers to supervise the executive branch.

=== Advice and consent theory ===
The advice and consent theory asserted that the contingency of appointments and treaties on the advice and consent of the Senate in the Appointments Clause and Treaty Clause implied a similar power to condition removals on the advice and consent of the Senate. About 6 Representatives voiced support of this theory.

=== Impeachment theory ===
The impeachment theory argued that officers could only be removed through the impeachment process in Congress. It had the fewest supporters among Congress and was only supported by 2-3 Representatives. Its prime advocate, William Smith, argued that offices were akin to property for officeholders and that they could not be deprived of them without findings of malfeasance.

== Debate over constitutional meaning ==
The traditional legal view of the Decision of 1789, held by some of the United States' leading figures, was that it supported the existence of the presidential removal power. Writing as Pacificus, Alexander Hamilton stated that the Decision of 1789 construed the Constitution as placing full executive removal power with the President. This view was supported by Chief Justice John Marshall in his biography of George Washington. This interpretation of the Decision of 1789 has been used in Supreme Court cases that have set precedent. In Myers v. United States, Chief Justice William H. Taft, writing for the majority, used the Decision of 1789 as support for broad presidential removal powers.

More recently, Chief Justice John Roberts used the Decision of 1789 in both Free Enterprise Fund v. Public Company Accounting Oversight Board (2010) and Seila Law LLC v. Consumer Financial Protection Bureau (2020) to support his construction of the President's removal power. Justice Samuel Alito also cited the Decision in the majority opinion for Collins v. Yellen (2021), invalidating statutory limits on the president's power to remove the director of the Federal Housing Finance Agency.

A dissenting (so-called revisionist, or judicial minimalist, as opposed to originalist) view of the decision is that it did not resolve, and possibly intentionally deferred answer to, constitutional questions on the authority of the president to remove executive branch officials. In Seila Law, Justice Elena Kagan challenged Roberts's characterization of the Decision of 1789, stating that "[t]he best view is that the First Congress 'was deeply divided' on the President's removal power, and 'never squarely addressed' the central issue here".

In recent discourse, law professors Jed Shugerman and Saikrishna Prakash have prominently written and debated about the Decision of 1789, with Prakash adopting the viewpoint of a removal power conveyed by the decision and Shugerman opposing such a conclusion.

== See also ==
- Tenure of Office Act (1820)
- Tenure of Office Act (1867)
