= Financial disclosure of public servants =

Form about civil servants' assets

Financial disclosure of public servants is a disclosure of financial information by public servants. It is a requirement of the United Nations Convention against Corruption (UNCAC), and is also known as an asset declaration,

== History ==
Not counting states in the USA, the first country which made declarations available to public was United Kingdom in 1974, when the House of Commons introduced the Register of Members' Financial Interests. Following the Watergate scandal financial disclosure of public officials was made a requirement in the United States by its Ethics in Government Act of 1978. By 1980, most European countries required public assets declarations.

Asset declaration aims to increase transparency and the trust, prevent and resolve conflicts of interest, and monitor wealth either to discourage from misconduct or to provide additional evidence.

=== Conflict of interest control ===
The UNCAC states that the conflict of interest is a criterion which determines what information should be disclosed. The Organisation for Economic Co-operation and Development (OECD) defines conflict of interest as "a conflict between the public duty and private interests of a public official, in which the public official has private-capacity interests which could improperly influence the performance of their official duties and responsibilities".

== See also ==
- Sarbanes–Oxley Act
