= Freytag v. Commissioner =

- Supreme Court of the United States

Argued April 23, 1991 Decided June 27, 1991
- Full case name: Thomas L. Freytag, et al. v. Commissioner of Internal Revenue
- Citations: 501 U.S. 868 (more) 111 S. Ct. 2631; 115 L. Ed. 2d 764

Case history
- Prior: 89 T.C. 849 (1987); affirmed, 904 F.2d 1011 (5th Cir. 1990); cert. granted, 498 U.S. 1066 (1991).

Holding
- Special trial judges of the United States Tax Court are inferior officers of the United States and are thus subject to the Appointments Clause.

Court membership
- Chief Justice William Rehnquist Associate Justices Byron White · Thurgood Marshall; Harry Blackmun · John P. Stevens; Sandra Day O'Connor · Antonin Scalia; Anthony Kennedy · David Souter

Case opinions
- Majority: Blackmun, joined by Rehnquist, White, Marshall, Stevens; O'Connor, Scalia, Kennedy, Souter (except part IV)
- Concurrence: Scalia (in part), joined by O'Connor, Kennedy, Souter

Laws applied
- U.S. Const. art. II

Freytag v. Commissioner of Internal Revenue, 501 U.S. 868 (1991), is a United States federal court case in which the Supreme Court of the United States decided the characteristics of inferior officers of the United States for the purposes of the Appointments Clause.

The case concerned the appointment method of special trial judges of the United States Tax Court. The Court was unanimous in its conclusion that special trial judges were inferior officers under the Appointments Clause, rather than mere employees, because of the characteristics of their office and that their appointment was constitutional. Positions constitute inferior officers when the position (1) is established by law and (2) exercises significant authority (3) involving significant discretion.

The division between the majority, led by Justice Harry Blackmun, and the concurrence, led by Justice Antonin Scalia, centered on the status of the Tax Court itself. Under the Appointments Clause, inferior officers may only be appointed by the President, Heads of Departments, or the Courts of Law. The majority determined the Tax Court, which exercises power as an Article I court was a "Court of Law" for the purpose of the Appointments Clause and was thus constitutional. The concurrence, however, would have held "Courts of Law" are limited to traditional Article III courts. Instead, the concurrence would have permitted the appointments under the view that the Tax Court is a "Head of a Department".

== Background ==
Under the Tax Reform Act of 1969, the United States Congress established the United States Tax Court as an Article I court and charged it with adjudicating disputes over federal income tax. The judges of the Tax Court were to be appointed by the President, by and with the advice and consent of the Senate, to serve a term of 15 years. By amendments in 1984, Congress authorized the Chief Judge of the Tax Court to appoint and assign special trial judges to hear such cases as the Chief Judge may designate.

Thomas Freytag and several other defendants were charged by the Commissioner of Internal Revenue with using a tax shelter scheme to avoid paying approximately $1.5 billion in taxes. The defendants petitioned to the Tax Court to review the Commissioner's determination. Their case was assigned by the Chief Judge of the Tax Court to a special trial judge with the consent of the defendants. The special trial judge upheld the Commissioner's decision and the Chief Judge subsequently adopted the opinion as that of the Tax Court itself.

The defendants appeals the decision to the United States Court of Appeals for the Fifth Circuit, arguing the appointment of a special trial judge violated the Appointments Clause found in Article II of the United States Constitution, which provides that inferior officers of the United States may be appointed by the "Courts of Law". The defendants asserted the Courts of Law referenced in the Appointments Clause includes only Article III judges, such as federal district judges, and not the Article I judges like the Chief Judge of the Tax Court.

The Fifth Circuit rejected the defendant's arguments and affirmed the Tax Court's decision, ruling the statute authorized the appointment. Further, the defendants had waived any constitutional challenge to the appointment by consent to the assignment.

== Opinion of the Court ==
=== Blackmun Majority ===
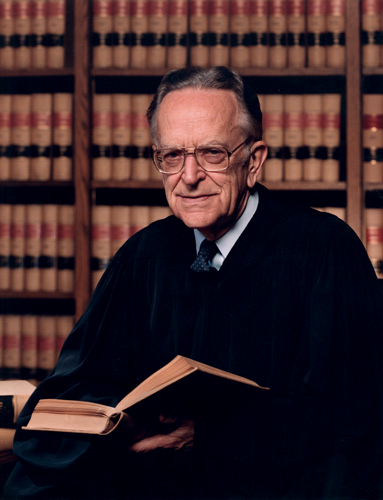
Justice Harry Blackmun delivered the opinion of the Court.

Justice Harry Blackmun determined the appointment of the special trial judge did not violate the Appointments Clause. Under the clause, Congress may invest the power to appoint inferior officers of the United States in the President, Heads of Departments, or the Courts of Law. As a preliminary issue, the Court was forced to determine if the special trial judges were "inferior officers" who are subject to the Clause as the defendants argued or if they were merely "lessor functionary", that is, employees of the federal government, who are not as the Commissioner argued. On this point, Blackmun agreed with the defendants, noting the special trial judges did far more than aid the regular judges of the Tax Court, instead exercising "significant authority" under the law. That the decisions of the special trial judge were not final until adopted by the Chief Judge did not reduce their officer status. The office of special trial judge was established by law, with their duties also specified by law. Further, the special trial judges performed more than mere ministerial tasks, instead exercising "significant discretion" in the performance of their duties.

While agreeing with the defendants that the special trial judge was an officer of the United States who must be appointed in conformity with the Clause's requirements, Blackmun rejected the notation that their appointment by the Chief Judge of the Tax Court did not comply with the Clause. Reviewing the historical rationale behind the Appointments Clause, Blackmun noted the Clause's principal purpose was to limit who could exercise the power to appoint federal officers, thereby ensuring those who wielded the power were accountable to the American people. While the Chief Judge was not a head of a department – which the Court had previously limited only to members of the United States Cabinet such as the United States Secretary of State or the United States Secretary of the Treasury – the Tax Court he presided over did qualify as a Court of Law. Blackmun held that the term "Courts of Law" was not limited to Article III courts but also included Article I courts.
