= Wiener v. United States =

- Supreme Court of the United States

Argued November 18, 1957 Decided June 30, 1958
- Full case name: Wiener v. United States
- Citations: 357 U.S. 349 (more)

Holding
- The President's plenary removal power does not include members of quasi-judicial bodies.

Court membership
- Chief Justice Earl Warren Associate Justices Hugo Black · Felix Frankfurter; William O. Douglas · Harold H. Burton; Tom C. Clark · John M. Harlan II; William J. Brennan Jr. · Charles E. Whittaker

Case opinion
- Majority: Frankfurter, joined by unanimous

Laws applied
- U.S. Const. art. II, § 2, cl. 2

Wiener v. United States, 357 U.S. 349 (1958), was a decision of the United States Supreme Court in which the Court held that the President's plenary removal authority does not include an officer of the United States who exercises quasi-judicial authority. The legislative framework established for the War Claims Commission suggests that Congress intended to provide a degree of insulation from executive influence to ensure impartial adjudication. This case reaffirms the separation of powers under the United States Constitution.

== Background ==
The War Claims Commission was created by Congress in 1948 to handle claims from World War II victims. The Commission was supposed to have three members appointed by the President with Senate Approval.

Wiener was appointed by President Harry Truman and confirmed on June 2, 1950. When Dwight Eisenhower became President he demanded Wiener's resignation. When Wiener refused, the President fired him.

Wiener filed a lawsuit arguing that the President could not remove him without statutory authorization. Congress had created the Commission as a temporary commission to independently adjudicate claims for the distribution of certain funds by Congress. They had not specified any provision for the President to remove members of the Commission.

The Supreme Court agreed to hear the case because it presented a constitutional question about the President's Article II powers.

== Supreme Court ==
In an opinion written by Justice Felix Frankfurter, the Court emphasized that Congress was aware of the Humphrey's Executor v. United States decision:

Humphrey's case was a cause celebre—and not least in the halls of Congress. And what is the essence of the decision in Humphrey's case? It drew a sharp line of cleavage between officials who were part of the Executive establishment and were thus removable by virtue of the President's constitutional powers, and those who are members of a body "to exercise its judgment without the leave or hindrance of any other official or any department of government", as to whom a power of removal exists only if Congress may fairly be said to have conferred it.

The Court reasoned, based on the precedent of Humphrey's Executor, that the President's ability to remove officials depends on the nature of their roles. The Court concluded that Congress intended the Commission to operate as an independent adjudicatory body, protecting commissioners from the “Sword of Damocles” of presidential removal for decisions made in the performance of their duties.
