= Lucia v. Securities and Exchange Commission =

- Supreme Court of the United States

Argued April 23, 2018 Decided June 21, 2018
- Full case name: Raymond J. Lucia, et al. v. Security and Exchange Commission
- Docket no.: 17-130
- Citations: 585 U.S. 237 (more) 138 S. Ct. 2044; 201 L. Ed. 2d 464

Case history
- Prior: Raymond J. Lucia Cos. v. SEC, 832 F.3d 277 (D.C. Cir. 2016); petition for review denied by equally divided en banc court, 868 F.3d 1021 (D.C. Cir. 2017); cert. granted, 138 S. Ct. 736 (2018).
- Subsequent: Raymond J. Lucia Cos. v. SEC, 736 F. App'x 2 (D.C. Cir. 2018)

Holding
- Administrative law judges of the Securities and Exchange Commission are considered officers of the United States and so are subject to the Appointments Clause.

Court membership
- Chief Justice John Roberts Associate Justices Anthony Kennedy · Clarence Thomas; Ruth Bader Ginsburg · Stephen Breyer; Samuel Alito · Sonia Sotomayor; Elena Kagan · Neil Gorsuch

Case opinions
- Majority: Kagan, joined by Roberts, Kennedy, Thomas, Alito, Gorsuch
- Concurrence: Thomas, joined by Gorsuch
- Concur/dissent: Breyer, joined by Ginsburg, Sotomayor (Part III)
- Dissent: Sotomayor, joined by Ginsburg

Laws applied
- U.S. Const., Art. II, §2, cl. 2

Lucia v. Securities and Exchange Commission, 585 U.S. 237 (2018), was a decision by the Supreme Court of the United States on the status of administrative law judges of the Securities and Exchange Commission. The Court held that they are considered inferior officers of the United States and so are subject to the Appointments Clause and must be appointed through the President or other delegated officer of the United States, rather than hired. As "inferior" officers, their appointments are not subject to the Senate's advice and consent role.

== Background ==
Like many other government agencies, the Securities and Exchange Commission (SEC) uses administrative law judges (ALJ) to act as a judge in resolving disputes for the agency related to administrative law, those laws that describe how the agency is run. Prior to this case, through November 2017, the SEC had selected ALJ through an in-house hiring process, without seeking consult of the President or officers.

In 2012, investment adviser Ray Lucia promoted a retirement investment strategy called "Buckets of Money" through several seminars. The SEC believed Lucia was offering misleading information in the presentations and charged Lucia and his investment company under the Investment Advisers Act of 1940. SEC ALJ Cameron Elliot was assigned the case, and after hearings, ruled against Lucia, fining him US$300,000 and barring him for life from participating in the investment industry. Lucia appealed the case to the SEC, arguing that Elliot's position was considered an "officer of the United States" under the Appointments Clause, and therefore it was required that he be appointed to that position by the President or other officers. Because Elliot had not been appointed but instead hired through an in-house process, Lucia argued that Elliot was not empowered to issue the ruling.

The SEC rejected Lucia's claim that ALJs were officers of the United States; the ALJs used by SEC may issue decisions with significant ramifications for those charged, but the decisions are reviewed by the SEC Commissioners, who are appointed by the President, before they are approved and implemented. To the SEC, ALJs were only employees of the agency, and therefore did not need to be appointed. For this reason, the SEC dismissed Lucia's appeal.

Lucia appealed to the United States Court of Appeals for the District of Columbia Circuit, which also aligned with the SEC in that ALJs did not serve as officers of the United States. After an en banc hearing by the Court of Appeals, the full ten-member panel was split, forcing them to issue a per curiam decision that maintained the SEC's position.

Lucia's argument was not the first time the question of ALJ's status had been raised in courts, but in at least two previous cases, the United States courts of appeals had ruled that the question was a matter of administrative review, not a constitutional question. Lucia's case at the SEC led one of the SEC commissioners hearing the case to question whether ALJs must be appointed or not. The case and the election of President Donald Trump, which put more pressure on the use of ALJs in the government made the SEC formally announce on November 20, 2017, that ALJs would be appointed by its five commissioners to align with the Constitution's Appointments Clause and eliminate the constitutionality questions raised by this case.

== Supreme Court ==
Lucia petitioned to the Supreme Court for writ of certiorari in July 2017; his petition presented the question of whether ALJs are officers of the United States and so are subject to the Appointments Clause. The Court granted the petition in January 2018 and set oral argument for April 23, 2018.

During the case's review in lower courts, the United States government had backed the SEC's stance. With the election of Donald Trump as President, the government's stance had changed to favoring the argument that ALJs should be appointed. The SEC had already changed its process of hiring ALJs prior to the Supreme Court decision by requiring appointments to be approved by a vote of the Commission. In its brief to the Supreme Court, the government also held the stance that as ALJs should be appointed and able to be dismissed at the discretion of the President or other delegated officer. The Court did not consider that question during oral hearings and internal debates.

== Decision ==
The Court announced judgment in favor of Lucia on June 21, 2018, reversing and remanding to the circuit court by 7–2. The decision affirmed Lucia's statement that ALJs are officers of the United States since they are effectively given quasi-judicial executive power and so must be appointed by the President or a delegated officer. The Court ruled that Lucia must have a new hearing before a different, properly-appointed officer from the SEC but otherwise did not comment on any other aspect of the case. The majority opinion was written by Justice Elena Kagan and was joined by Chief Justice John Roberts, as well as Justices Anthony Kennedy, Clarence Thomas, Samuel Alito, and Neil Gorsuch.

The Court's ruling is expected to allow any entity with a then-pending case before an SEC ALJ to request a new hearing by a new ALJ, but the ruling was crafted as to prevent completed cases from being reopened; it is unknown if this case would apply to cases open at other agencies besides the SEC.

=== Concurring and dissenting opinions ===
Justice Thomas wrote a concurring opinion, joined by Gorsuch. Thomas argued that the meaning of the term "Officers of the United States" should be determined based on the term's original public meaning, which, he argued, encompassed all federal civil officials with responsibility for an ongoing statutory duty, rather than by reference to Freytag v. Commissioner.

Justice Stephen Breyer wrote an opinion concurring in the judgment in part and dissenting in part, which was joined in part by Justices Ruth Bader Ginsburg and Sonia Sotomayor. Breyer agreed that the appointment of ALJs by SEC staff, rather than the commissioners themselves, was illegal. But Breyer believed this practice violated the Administrative Procedure Act and, thus, it was unnecessary to address the constitutional question answered by the majority. In addition, Breyer argued that it was problematic to determine the "inferior Officer" status of ALJs without first deciding the "pre-existing Free Enterprise Fund question— namely, what effect that holding would have on the statutory 'for cause' removal protections that Congress provided for administrative law judges." Finally, Breyer disagreed with the need for a hearing before a different ALJ, as it is not clear that the Constitution requires a hearing before a different "Officer" after an Appointments Clause violation.

Sotomayor also wrote a dissenting opinion, joined by Ginsburg, which stated that ALJs should not be treated as officers as their judgments are not treated as final and binding.

== Later developments ==
In 2023, the Supreme Court granted the case SEC v. Jarkesy which challenged the constitutionality of the SEC's use of administrative proceedings on the ground that the use of ALJs instead of jury trials violated the Seventh Amendment. SEC v. Jarkesy was decided in June 2024, with the majority opinion holding that, when the SEC seeks civil penalties against those it accuses of civil fraud violations, those accused are entitled to a jury trial in federal court rather than a non-jury hearing before an agency tribunal.
