= Humphrey's Executor v. United States =

- Supreme Court of the United States

Argued May 1, 1935 Decided May 27, 1935
- Full case name: Humphrey's Executor v. United States; Rathbun, Executor v. United States
- Citations: 295 U.S. 602 (more) 55 S. Ct. 869; 79 L. Ed. 1611; 1935 U.S. LEXIS 1089

Holding
- Congress may create quasi-legislative or quasi-judicial agencies that are independent of executive control. The legislative intent of the Federal Trade Commission Act's for-cause removal provision was to limit the President's removal power. Shurtleff distinguished, Myers limited.

Court membership
- Chief Justice Charles E. Hughes Associate Justices Willis Van Devanter · James C. McReynolds; Louis Brandeis · George Sutherland; Pierce Butler · Harlan F. Stone; Owen Roberts · Benjamin N. Cardozo

Case opinion
- Majority: Sutherland, joined by unanimous

Laws applied
- U.S. Const. art. I; U.S. Const. art. II; Federal Trade Commission Act
- Overruled by
- Trump v. Slaughter, No. 25–332, 609 U.S. ___ (2026)

Humphrey's Executor v. United States, 295 U.S. 602 (1935), was a landmark U.S. Supreme Court decision that ruled that the U.S. Congress may limit the power of the president of the United States to fire certain government officials, even though the president is the chief executive of the U.S. government. The Court ruled that the U.S. Constitution allows Congress to restrict the president's authority to dismiss the leaders of independent agencies that are "quasi-legislative" or "quasi-judicial" in nature.

The case stemmed from President Franklin D. Roosevelt's 1933 dismissal of William E. Humphrey as a commissioner of the Federal Trade Commission (FTC). Roosevelt had fired Humphrey over policy disagreements involving economic regulation and the New Deal, despite the Federal Trade Commission Act of 1914 giving the president the power to remove an FTC commissioner only for "inefficiency, neglect of duty, or malfeasance in office." The Court unanimously held that this limitation on the president's authority to remove FTC commissioners was constitutional and therefore that Humphrey's dismissal had been unlawful.

Over the course of the 20th century, Humphrey's Executor came to be viewed as the canonical precedent for the constitutionality of independent agencies in the U.S. federal government. The decision received criticism from some scholars during the latter part of the 20th century who claimed it unconstitutionally limited the powers of the president. During the second Donald Trump presidency, several firings of independent-agency executive officials spawned lawsuits challenging the ongoing validity of the decision. One of these challenges culminated in the Supreme Court's June 2026 decision Trump v. Slaughter, which overruled Humphrey's Executor.

== Background ==
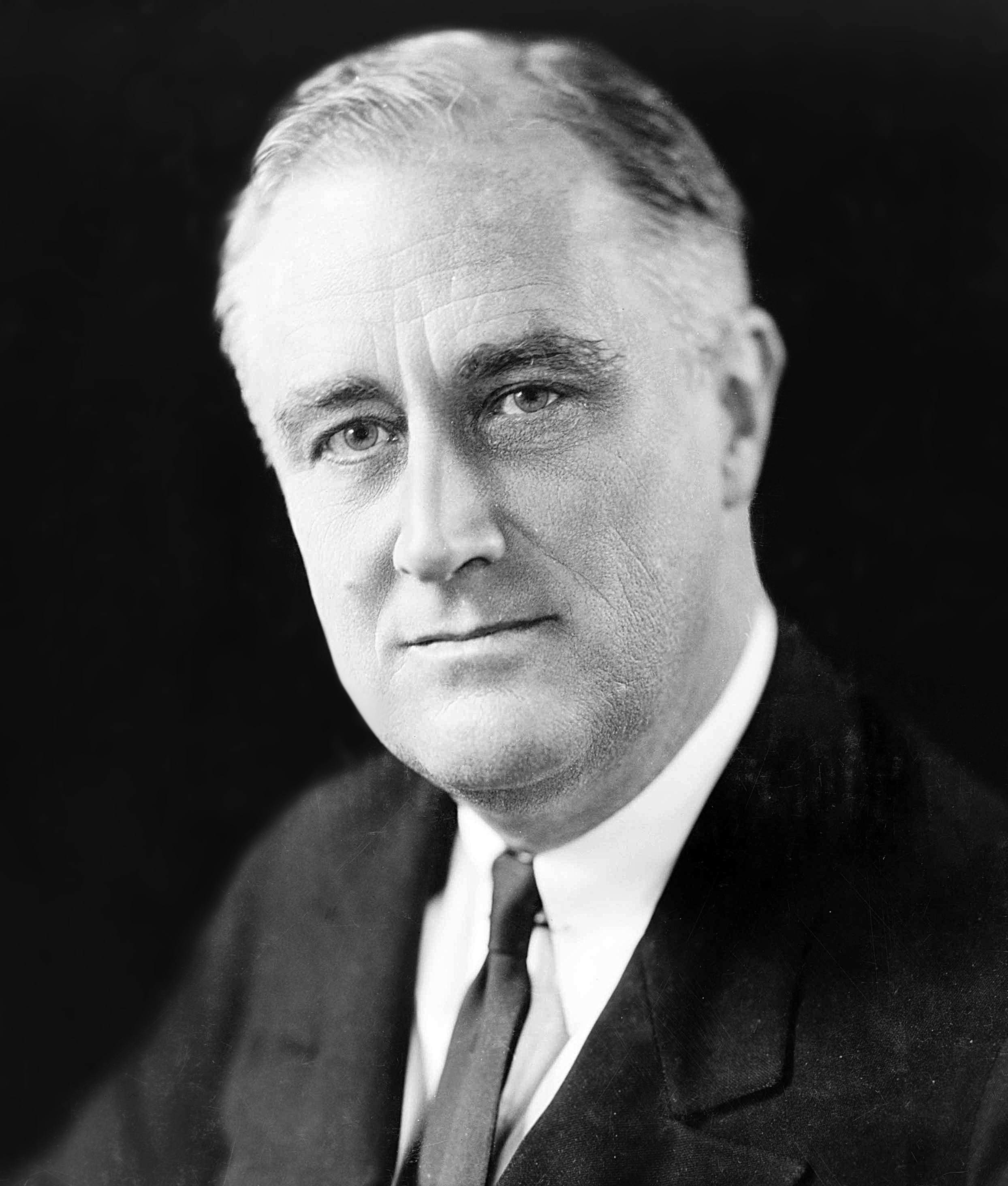
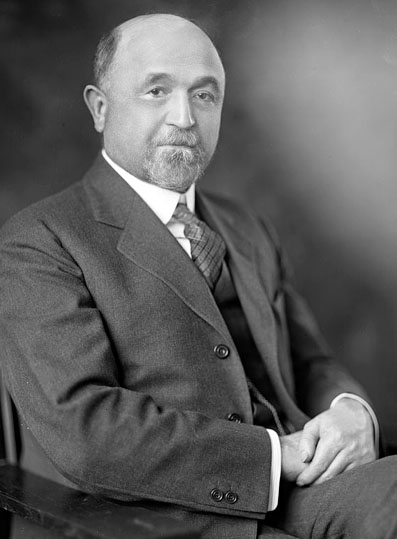
President Franklin D. Roosevelt (left) fired FTC Commissioner William Humphrey (right) due solely to their policy disagreements, even though the FTC Act listed only "inefficiency, neglect of duty, or malfeasance in office" as the reasons a President could remove a commissioner.

Humphrey had been one of the five commissioners of the FTC since his appointment in 1925 by President Calvin Coolidge, having been reappointed in 1931 by President Herbert Hoover. An outspoken and controversial commissioner, Humphrey was a conservative Republican who opposed most of the Commission's antitrust enforcement actions and frequently engaged in personal and political attacks. In public speeches, he criticized the FTC's "old policy of litigation" against American companies, contending that it had made the Commission "an instrument of oppression and disturbance and injury instead of a help to business."

Upon assuming the presidency in 1933, Roosevelt quickly developed a strong dislike for Humphrey, whom he viewed as insufficiently supportive of his New Deal agenda. In his first months in office, Roosevelt twice wrote letters to Humphrey asking him to resign because his views did not align with Roosevelt's own.

You will, I know, realize that I do not feel that your mind and my mind go along together on either the policies or the administering of the Federal Trade Commission, and, frankly, I think it is best for the people of this country that I should have a full confidence.

— Letter from President Franklin D. Roosevelt to Commissioner William Humphrey (August 31, 1933).

Humphrey resisted Roosevelt's requests and refused to resign. In October 1933, Roosevelt sent Humphrey a third letter that simply fired him. Humphrey's dismissal was based solely on his political and ideological differences with Roosevelt, rather than on poor performance or misconduct. This conflicted with section 1 of the FTC Act, which listed only "inefficiency, neglect of duty, or malfeasance in office" as the reasons a President could remove an FTC commissioner from office.

In February 1934, five months after his firing, Humphrey died of a stroke at age 71. Upon his dismissal, the FTC had stopped paying Humphrey his salary of $10,000 per year (equivalent to $249,000 in 2025), even though he had continued to come to work at the FTC each day. Samuel Rathbun, the executor of Humphrey's estate, sued the U.S. government in the Court of Claims, claiming that Humphrey's firing had been unlawful and that the government therefore owed his estate five months of back pay for the period between his firing and his death.

While adjudicating the lawsuit, the Court of Claims issued two certified questions to the U.S. Supreme Court:

1. "Do the provisions of section 1 of the Federal Trade Commission Act, stating that 'any commissioner may be removed by the President for inefficiency, neglect of duty, or malfeasance in office', restrict or limit the power of the President to remove a commissioner except upon one or more of the causes named?"
2. "If the foregoing question is answered in the affirmative, then—If the power of the President to remove a commissioner is restricted or limited as shown by the foregoing interrogatory and the answer made thereto, is such a restriction or limitation valid under the Constitution of the United States?"

Answering these certified questions was the basis for the Supreme Court's decision.

== Supreme Court ==
=== Argument ===
William J. Donovan argued, on behalf of the executor of the Humphrey estate, that the expressio unius rule of statutory construction confirmed the intent of Congress was to limit the removal of FTC Commissioners to "inefficiency, neglect of duty, or malfeasance in office" only. On the government's view Humphrey's Executor presented the same question as Shurtleff v. United States (1903) but this argument failed because the FTC's structure was different. The government, citing Myers v. United States, also made a constitutional argument.

=== Decision ===
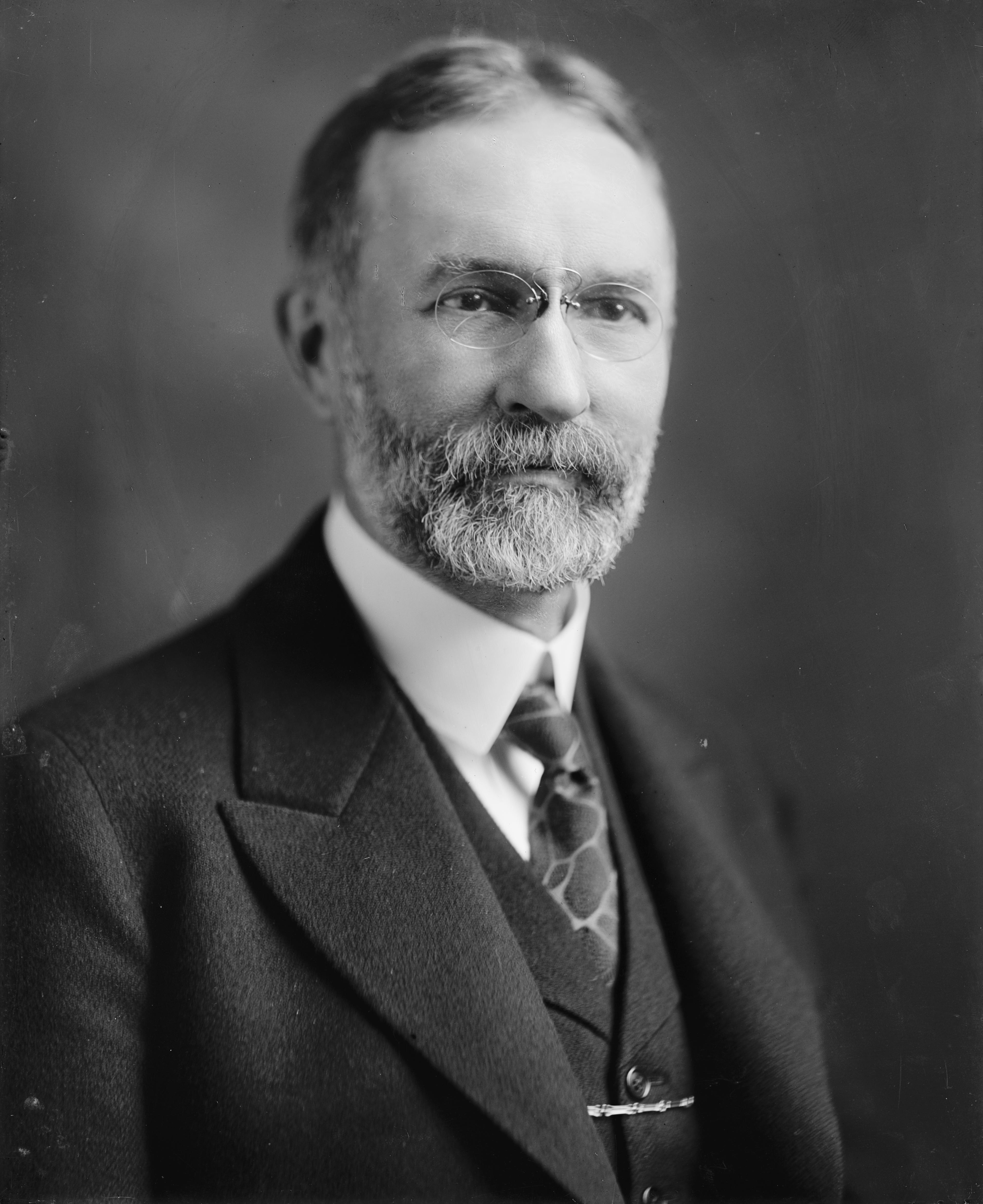
Justice George Sutherland, the author of the Supreme Court's opinion in Humphrey's Executor.

On May 27, 1935, the Supreme Court issued a unanimous 9–0 decision in favor of Rathbun and Humphrey's estate. In an opinion written by Justice George Sutherland, the Court ruled that it was not a violation of the Constitution for the FTC Act to limit the power of the President to remove FTC commissioners only to situations involving "inefficiency, neglect of duty, or malfeasance in office".

The Court’s opinion gave four main reasons for its ruling. First, the Court said that when Congress had created the FTC in 1914, it had intended the Commission to be a federal government agency that was independent and non-partisan. The opinion described the FTC as an agency that was supposed to be free from control by the President and the executive branch, except for the initial appointments of its commissioners by the President:

The commission is to be nonpartisan, and it must, from the very nature of its duties, act with entire impartiality. It is charged with the enforcement of no policy except the policy of the law. ...

...
The debates in both houses demonstrate that the prevailing view was that the commission was not to be "subject to anybody in the government, but ... only to the people of the United States"; free from "political domination or control" or the "probability or possibility of such a thing"; to be "separate and apart from any existing department of the government — not subject to the orders of the President."
...

Thus, the language of the [FTC] act, the legislative reports, and the general purposes of the legislation as reflected by the debates all combine to demonstrate the Congressional intent to create a body of experts who shall gain experience by length of service — a body which shall be independent of executive authority except in its selection, and free to exercise its judgment without the leave or hindrance of any other official or any department of the government.

— Humphrey's Executor, 295 U.S. at 624, 625–26 (third ellipsis in original).

Second, the Court said that Congress had intended FTC commissioners to be experts in business and industry who would "exercise the trained judgment of a body of experts" while being insulated from politics. It compared the FTC to the Interstate Commerce Commission, which Congress had created in 1887 as an independent overseer of practices in the railroad industry.

The Court's third and fourth reasons were that the function and duties of the FTC were "neither political nor executive, but predominantly quasi-judicial and quasi-legislative". The Court said the FTC did not perform the traditional executive-branch function of enforcing the law, but instead was more like a legislative or judicial body. It reasoned that because the FTC did not enforce the law, the President did not need unfettered removal power over FTC commissioners in order to fulfill his duty under Article II of the U.S. Constitution to "take Care that the Laws be faithfully executed".

The Court concluded by ruling that the removal restrictions in section 1 of the FTC Act were constitutional, meaning that Myers v. United States did not prevent Congress from structuring an agency to be independent of executive control:

The authority of Congress, in creating quasi-legislative or quasi-judicial agencies, to require them to act in discharge of their duties independently of executive control cannot well be doubted, and that authority includes, as an appropriate incident, power to fix the period during which they shall continue in office, and to forbid their removal except for cause in the meantime. For it is quite evident that one who holds his office only during the pleasure of another cannot be depended upon to maintain an attitude of independence against the latter's will.

— Humphrey's Executor, 295 U.S. at 629.

== Analysis ==
Humphrey's Executor occurred at a moment in American history when tensions between the President and the Supreme Court were at an all-time high. The Court issued the decision on the same day as A.L.A. Schechter Poultry Corp. v. United States, a historic decision that struck down a key piece of Roosevelt's New Deal agenda—the National Industrial Recovery Act of 1933—as unconstitutional. Legal scholars often view Humphrey's Executor in the context of the Court's "unprecedented but short-lived" effort in the mid-1930s to rein in the power of the President, which eventually resulted in Roosevelt's unsuccessful attempt to pack the Court.

Although Humphrey's Executor described the Federal Trade Commission as an administrative body established to carry out legislative policies, it nevertheless concluded that the agency was not an arm of the executive. Critics argued that the distinction between "purely executive" officers and officials performing quasi-legislative or quasi-judicial functions proved difficult to apply in practice. Some legal scholars criticized the "functionalist" reasoning of the decision. In a widely cited Columbia Law Review article published in 1984, the American legal scholar Peter L. Strauss said "the reasoning of the Humphrey's Executor Court seems open to question" because it was inconsistent with a formalist view of the separation of powers. As "the FTC did little as to which unified policy direction was even arguably relevant", Strauss questioned whether this type of reasoning would support the longstanding view that Myers should be limited to what he called "the Tenure of Office Act problem".

At the time of the decision, moreover, the FTC's powers and authority were limited. The FTC had no formal policymaking powers during the mid-1930s. It was authorized by statute to prevent unfair methods of competition by issuing "cease and desist" orders and, if an order was violated, applying to a circuit court of appeals for its enforcement. It were not empowered to initiate direct civil enforcement actions such as suing in federal court to enjoin an unfair method of competition. It could only adjudicate individual disputes and give information and advice to Congress.

Subsequent decisions reached inconsistent results, reflecting the reality that agencies often combine executive, legislative, and adjudicatory functions, and that the balance among those functions may change over time; the Supreme Court later confirmed in Buckley v. Valeo (1976) that the "discretionary power to seek judicial relief...cannot possibly be regarded as merely in aid of the legislative function of Congress".

== Subsequent developments ==
Most recent disputes about separation of powers have turned on specifics of agency design, with the conservative majority Supreme Court increasingly unwilling to uphold the independence of agencies that differed from the bipartisan, multimember structure upheld in Humphrey's Executor. In a 2020 decision Seila Law v. CFPB the Chief Justice wrote that Humphrey's Executor applied to multimember agencies "that do not wield substantial executive power" and would not be extended to "new situations". Seila Law left open questions about whether Humphrey's Executor would be overruled.

Overturning Humphrey's Executor was seen as a key point in Project 2025 by the conservative group, the Heritage Foundation, and which was put into motion within the second presidency of Donald Trump in 2025. Several of Trump's early steps as president was to dismiss heads or commissioners of independent agencies, leading to lawsuits challenging these dismissals under Humphrey's Executor. On May 22, 2025, in a 6-3 unsigned order in response to an emergency appeal from Donald Trump, the Supreme Court stayed the reinstatement of two independent regulators, Gwynne Wilcox of the National Labor Relations Board and chair Cathy A. Harris of the Merit Systems Protection Board, pending further review in lower courts. The unsigned order stated that "because the Constitution vests the executive power in the President, he may remove without cause executive officers who exercise that power on his behalf, subject to narrow exceptions recognized by our precedents." However, the Court did not rule on the merits, with the order stating "The stay reflects our judgment that the Government is likely to show that both the NLRB and MSPB exercise considerable executive power. But we do not ultimately decide in this posture whether the NLRB or MSPB falls within such a recognized exception; that question is better left for resolution after full briefing and argument."

The Wilcox stay order was sharply criticized by Justice Elena Kagan in a dissent joined by Justices Sonia Sotomayor and Ketanji Brown Jackson, saying that the ruling had effectively repealed Humphrey's Executor "by fiat", and that "nowhere is short-circuiting our deliberative process less appropriate than when the ruling requested would disrespect—by either overturning or narrowing—one of this Court's longstanding precedents". Kagan also criticized the order's call-out to separate the Federal Reserve Board from other independent agencies, saying that this board's independence "rests on the same constitutional and analytic foundations as that of the NLRB, MSPB, FTC, FCC, and so on — which is to say it rests largely on Humphrey's."

=== Overruling in 2026 ===
After taking office in 2025, Trump began firing heads of independent agencies, and legal scholars predicted the president was attempting to set up a test case to overturn Humphrey's Executor. On March 18, 2025, Trump fired two Democratic members of the FTC, including Rebecca Kelly Slaughter. She sued to block the firing. On September 8, 2025, the Supreme Court similarly stayed an injunction that had blocked her firing while the case was litigated.

The Supreme Court accepted the case on September 22, 2025, to hear the case before judgment from lower courts in December 2025, over dissent from justices Sotomayor, Kagan, and Jackson, with oral arguments held December 8, 2025.

On June 29, 2026, the Court issued its 6-3 decision in Trump v. Slaughter, allowing Slaughter's firing to remain, and overturning Humphrey's Executor. Chief Justice John Roberts wrote, "[i]f anything more is left of Humphrey's, the Court overrules it".

== See also ==
- The Appointments Clause of the U.S. Constitution
- Tenure of Office Act (1867)
- Unitary executive theory
- Shurtleff v. United States (1903)
- Myers v. United States (1926)
- Wiener v. United States (1958)
- Bowsher v. Synar (1986)
- Morrison v. Olson (1988)
- Trump v. Cook (2026)
- Lawsuits over removals of independent agency heads during the second Trump presidency
