= FCC v. AT&T Inc. (2026) =

- Supreme Court of the United States

Decided June 4, 2026
- Full case name: FCC v. AT&T Inc.
- Docket no.: 25-406
- Citations: 608 U.S. ___ (more)

Holding
- Because forfeiture orders issued under §503(b)(4) do not definitively resolve the parties' legal obligations, and the FCC's factual findings in forfeiture proceedings are not conclusive, it does not violate the Seventh Amendment for the FCC to issue forfeiture orders without a jury trial.

Court membership
- Chief Justice John Roberts Associate Justices Clarence Thomas · Samuel Alito; Sonia Sotomayor · Elena Kagan; Neil Gorsuch · Brett Kavanaugh; Amy Coney Barrett · Ketanji Brown Jackson

Case opinions
- Majority: Roberts, joined by Alito, Sotomayor, Kagan, Gorsuch, Kavanaugh, Barrett, Jackson
- Dissent: Thomas

FCC v. AT&T Inc., 608 U.S. ___ (2026), was a United States Supreme Court case in which the court held that because forfeiture orders issued under §503(b)(4) do not definitively resolve the parties' legal obligations, and the FCC's factual findings in forfeiture proceedings are not conclusive, it does not violate the Seventh Amendment for the FCC to issue forfeiture orders without a jury trial. Because of this, the Seventh Amendment does not prohibit administrative adjudications without juries as long as the defendant retains the right to a full de novo jury trial after the administrative proceedings are concluded and before they can be made to pay.

== Analysis ==
In an 8–1 majority, Chief Justice John Roberts clarified the scope of the Seventh Amendment in administrative enforcement proceedings. While the Seventh Amendment preserves the right to a jury before legal obligations are conclusively settled, it does not dictate the stage when a jury trial must take place.The majority concluded agency fact-finding does not infringe upon constitutional jury rights if the findings remain preliminary and subject to de novo review before an Article III jury.

The Court distinguished the FCC's scheme from the Securities and Exchange Commission framework invalidated in SEC v. Jarkesy. Unlike the SEC penalties in Jarkesy, FCC forfeiture orders issued under 47 U.S.C. § 503(b)(4) carry no self-executing authority. Because the government cannot execute on assets, assess interest, or enforce payment without prevailing in a § 504(a) trial, the Court deemed the agency's forfeiture order a non-binding statutory prerequisite to suit (analogous to an EEOC right-to-sue letter) rather than a final adjudication of legal liability.

== Dissent ==
In his dissent, Justice Clarence Thomas argued the majority's holding relied on an incorrect reading of the FCC's enforcement history. He noted the FCC had long framed its forfeiture orders as mandatory. Thomas concluded because the carriers had complied with what appeared to be coercive, binding agency orders under protest, the Court unfairly deprived the carriers of relief.

== See also ==
- SEC v. Jarkesy
