= Weiss v. United States =

- Supreme Court of the United States

Argued November 3, 1993 Decided January 19, 1994
- Full case name: Eric J. Weiss v. United States
- Citations: 510 U.S. 163 (more) 114 S. Ct. 752; 127 L. Ed. 2d 1

Case history
- Prior: United States v. Weiss, 36 M.J. 224 (C.M.A. 1992); cert. granted, 508 U.S. 939 (1993).

Holding
- 1. The assignment by Congress of germane duties to an existing officer of the United States does not require the reappointment of the incumbent officer prior to exercising those duties.; 2. Commissioned military officers may be assigned to duty as military judges without being reappointed under the Appointments Clause.

Court membership
- Chief Justice William Rehnquist Associate Justices Harry Blackmun · John P. Stevens; Sandra Day O'Connor · Antonin Scalia; Anthony Kennedy · David Souter; Clarence Thomas · Ruth Bader Ginsburg

Case opinions
- Majority: Rehnquist, joined by Blackmun, Stevens, O'Connor, Kennedy, Souter, Ginsburg; Scalia, Thomas (Parts I, II-A)
- Concurrence: Souter
- Concurrence: Ginsburg
- Concurrence: Scalia (in part and in judgment), joined by Thomas

Laws applied
- U.S. Const. art. II, § 2, cl. 2

Weiss v. United States, 510 U.S. 163 (1994), is a Supreme Court of the United States case which held that commissioned military officers, who are appointed by the president of the United States by and with the advice and consent of the United States Senate, may be assigned to act as military judges without the need to be confirmed a second time by the Senate.

== Background ==
The petitioner Eric J. Weiss was a member of the United States Marine Corps who pled guilty to one count of larceny in violation of the Uniform Code of Military Justice. Upon review, the Navy-Marine Corps Court of Military Review affirmed the conviction.

Weiss appealed to the Court of Military Appeals, arguing the judges in his case had no authority to convict him because they had not been properly appointed under the Appointments Clause. The military trial judge who presided over his case was assigned to the same by the case by the Judge Advocate General of the service from among those United States military officers appointed by the President and confirmed by the Senate. Weiss argued the assignment was invalid and that the military judge was required to be appointed by the President rather than assigned by the Judge Advocate General. The Court of Military Appeals rejected this argument, affirmed his conviction.

== Decision ==
A unanimous Supreme Court ruled against Weiss, holding the method of appointment of the military judge was constitutional. The Court began by ruling that military judges are officers of the United States because they exercise significant authority under the laws of the United States and, therefore, must be appointed in conformity with the Appointments Clause. However, all military judges, as military officers, are appointed by the President and confirmed the Senate. Weiss argued that prior to assuming duties as a military judge, the military officer had to be reappointed. The Court rejected this argument, holding that military officers may be assigned to different duties within the military without running afoul of the Appointments Clause as long as the new assignment is germane to the office for which they were originally appointed. As all military officers have a duty to exercise control over the armed forces, serving as a military judge was germane.
