= Shurtleff v. United States =

- Supreme Court of the United States

Argued January 20, 1903 Decided April 6, 1903
- Full case name: Ferdinand N. Shurtleff v. United States
- Citations: 189 U.S. 311 (more)

Holding
- The President can, by virtue of his powers under the Appointments Clause, remove an officer of the United States. Absent an express law to the contrary, Congress will not be presumed to have taken away this power.

Court membership
- Chief Justice Melville Fuller Associate Justices John M. Harlan · David J. Brewer; Henry B. Brown · Edward D. White; Rufus W. Peckham · Joseph McKenna; Oliver W. Holmes Jr. · William R. Day

Case opinion
- Majority: Peckham, joined by unanimous

Laws applied
- U.S. Const. art. II, § 2, cl. 2

Shurtleff v. United States, 189 U.S. 311 (1903), was a decision of the United States Supreme Court concerning the president's removal power under the Appointments Clause.
