= Ryder v. United States =

- Supreme Court of the United States

Argued April 18, 1995 Decided June 12, 1995
- Full case name: Ryder v. United States
- Docket no.: 94-431
- Citations: 515 U.S. 177 (more)
- Argument: Oral argument

Holding
- A petitioner who makes a timely challenge to the constitutionality of the appointment of an Officer of the United States is entitled to a decision on the merits of the question under the Appointments Clause.

Court membership
- Chief Justice William Rehnquist Associate Justices John P. Stevens · Sandra Day O'Connor; Antonin Scalia · Anthony Kennedy; David Souter · Clarence Thomas; Ruth Bader Ginsburg · Stephen Breyer

Case opinion
- Majority: Rehnquist, joined by unanimous

Laws applied
- U.S. Const. art. II, § 2, cl. 2

Ryder v. United States, 515 U.S. 177 (1995), was a decision of the United States Supreme Court in which the court held that a petitioner who makes a timely challenge to the constitutionality of the appointment of an Officer of the United States is entitled to a decision on the merits of the question under the Appointments Clause. Ryder decision had been used to require a total invalidation of all actions taken by an adjudicator that had been unconstitutionally appointed.

Ryder v. United States involves a court-martial of a petitioner, Ryder, who is an enlisted member of the United States Coast Guard that have been convicted of several drug-related counts. The petitioner appealed his conviction to the Coast Guard Court of Military Review, which upheld his conviction. The petitioner then challenged the constitutional validity of the affirming panel, which included two civilian judges who had been appointed by the General Counsel of the Department of Transportation, which is rejected by the court again. Ryder then appealed his case to the Court of Military Appeals, which confirmed his earlier conviction again, though the Court of Military Appeals agreed that the previous three-judge panel violated the Appointments Clause because appellate military judges were inferior officers and subject to the constitutional requirements for appointment. Despite agreeing that the appointment of judges violated the Appointments Clause, the Court of Military Appeals decided that the actions of the judges below them are still valid.

The Supreme Court decided to reverse the judgment of the Court of Military Appeals.
