= Bowsher v. Synar =

- Supreme Court of the United States

Argued April 23, 1986 Decided July 7, 1986
- Full case name: Bowsher, Comptroller General of the United States v. Synar, Member of Congress, Et al.
- Citations: 478 U.S. 714 (more) 106 S. Ct. 3181; 92 L. Ed. 2d 583; 1986 U.S. LEXIS 141

Holding
- Congress cannot reserve removal power over executive officers to itself, except for impeachment. The Balanced Budget and Emergency Deficit Control Act of 1985 violates the separation of powers principle.

Court membership
- Chief Justice Warren E. Burger Associate Justices William J. Brennan Jr. · Byron White; Thurgood Marshall · Harry Blackmun; Lewis F. Powell Jr. · William Rehnquist; John P. Stevens · Sandra Day O'Connor

Case opinions
- Majority: Burger, joined by Brennan, Powell, Rehnquist, O'Connor
- Concurrence: Stevens, joined by Marshall
- Dissent: White
- Dissent: Blackmun

Laws applied
- U.S. Const. art. I and U.S. Const. art. II

Bowsher v. Synar, 478 U.S. 714 (1986), was a United States Supreme Court case that struck down the Gramm–Rudman–Hollings Act as an unconstitutional usurpation of executive power by Congress because the law empowered Congress to terminate the United States Comptroller General for certain specified reasons, including "inefficiency, 'neglect of duty,' or 'malfeasance.'" The named defendant in the original case was Comptroller General Charles Arthur Bowsher and the constitutional challenge was brought forth by Oklahoma congressman Mike Synar.

== Background ==
Under the Gramm–Rudman–Hollings Act, allowable deficit levels were calculated in consideration of the eventual elimination of the federal deficit. If the budget exceeded the allowable deficit, across-the-board cuts were required. Directors of the Office of Management and Budget (OMB) and the Congressional Budget Office (CBO) were required to report to the Comptroller General regarding their recommendations for how much must be cut. The Comptroller General then evaluated these reports, made his own conclusion, and reported his conclusions to the President, who was required to issue a "sequestration" order effecting the reductions recommended by the Comptroller General unless Congress made the cuts in other ways within a specified amount of time.

The Comptroller General was to be appointed by the President with the advice and consent of the Senate, and could only be removed by impeachment or a joint resolution of Congress. The district court ruled that this arrangement violated the separation of powers principle by creating a "here-and-now subservience" of the Comptroller General to Congress and could not be reconciled with the Supreme Court precedent in Humphrey's Executor v. United States, which had reaffirmed the core holding of Myers v. United States that the President alone had the power of removal over purely executive officers.

== Supreme Court ==
=== Majority ===
The Supreme Court ruled that Congress could not retain removal authority over an executive officer, based on the Decision of 1789, Myers v. United States, and INS v. Chadha. Justice Warren E. Burger's majority opinion rejected the argument that the Comptroller General was independent of Congress and invalidated the "assignment" of executive powers to an officer not subject to presidential control.

Burger's formalist reasoning was similar to other 1980s separation of powers cases:

[B]y placing the responsibility for the execution of the Balanced Budget and Emergency Deficit Control Act in the hands of an officer who is subject to removal only by itself, Congress in effect has retained control over the execution of the Act and has intruded into executive function.

Congress gave itself for cause removal authority over the Comptroller General, not only by impeachment, but also by joint resolution. Burger noted that the broad grounds for removal included "inefficiency" and "neglect of duty", while impeachment of executive officers was limited by the Constitution to "Treason, Bribery, or other high Crimes and Misdemeanors". He also included a footnote stating that this did not overturn Humphrey's Executor v. United States.

Burger held that if Congress were to retain removal power over executive officers, it would give them control over law execution, similar to the legislative veto that was held unconstitutional in Chadha: "Congress must abide by its delegation of authority until that delegation is legislatively altered or revoked."

Burger finally held that the Comptroller General's function under the act was the "very essence" of the execution of the laws since (1) it entailed interpreting the act to determine precisely what kind of budgetary calculations were required and (2) the Comptroller General commanded the President to carry out, without variation, his directive regarding budget resolutions.

=== Dissent ===
Justice Byron White's dissent argued that the act should have been upheld. He argued that determining the level of spending by the federal government is a legislative function, not an executive one. Even assuming the power were executive, White did not see any problems with delegating that power to an agent as long as Congress could influence him only by a means subject to Presentment Clause and Bicameralism Clause requirements, which the act satisfied since the comptroller general could be influenced by Congress only through impeachment or a joint resolution.

== See also ==
- List of United States Supreme Court cases, volume 478
- List of United States Supreme Court cases
- Lists of United States Supreme Court cases by volume
- List of United States Supreme Court cases by the Rehnquist Court
- Immigration and Naturalization Service v. Chadha (1983)
