= Ethics in Government Act =

United States federal law

Ethics in Government Act of 1978
- Long title: An Act to establish certain Federal agencies, effect certain reorganizations of the Federal Government, to implement certain reforms in the operation of the Federal Government and to preserve and promote the integrity of public officials and institutions, and for other purposes.
- Acronyms (colloquial): EIGA
- Nicknames: Ethics in Government Act of 1978
- Enacted by: the 95th United States Congress
- Effective: October 26, 1978

Citations
- Public law: Pub. L. 95–521
- Statutes at Large: 92 Stat. 1824

Codification
- Titles amended: 5 U.S.C.: Government Organization and Employees
- U.S.C. sections created: Title 5-Appendix - Ethics

Legislative history
- Introduced in the Senate as "Public Official Integrity Act" (S. 555) by Abraham Ribicoff (D-CT) on February 1, 1977; Committee consideration by Senate Governmental Affairs, Senate Judiciary; Passed the Senate on June 27, 1977 (74–5); Passed the House on September 27, 1978 (in lieu of H.R. 1, passed 365–6); Reported by the joint conference committee on October 1978; agreed to by the Senate on October 7, 1978 (cleared) and by the House on October 12, 1978 (370–23); Signed into law by President Jimmy Carter on October 26, 1978

Major amendments
- Courthouse Ethics and Transparency Act

United States Supreme Court cases
- Morrison v. Olson, April 26, 1988

The Ethics in Government Act of 1978 is a United States federal law that was passed in the wake of the Nixon Watergate scandal and the Saturday Night Massacre. It was intended to fight corruption in government.

== Summary ==
The Ethics in Government Act of 1978 is organized into six titles. It created mandatory, public disclosure of financial and employment history of public officials, as well as their immediate families. It also created restrictions on lobbying efforts by public officials for a set period after leaving public office. Lastly, it created the United States Office of Government Ethics to oversee the federal ethics program.

=== Title I ===
Title I requires those in the public service sector to fill out financial disclosure forms which include the sources and amounts of income, gifts, reimbursements, the identity and approximate value of property held and liabilities owed, transactions in property, commodities, and securities, and certain financial interests of a spouse or dependent. People that must file reports include, but are not limited to: the President, Vice President, employees and officers of the Executive Branch, Postmaster General, the Deputy Postmaster General, each Governor of the Board of Governors of the U.S. Postal Service, each officer or employee of the United States Postal Service or Postal Regulatory Commission, as well as judicial officers, such as Chief Justice, Associate Justices, appellate judges and district judges.

The report must then be filed to the appropriate state officer of their state of residence, and the committee charged with issues of ethics in their respective house of Congress. The President, Vice President, counsel appointed to the United States Department of Justice, and nominees to positions that require United States Senate confirmation must file with the Director of the Office of Government Ethics.

These reports are available to the public shortly after they are submitted.

The Attorney General of the United States can bring charges against anyone who falsifies information in the reports.

=== Title II and III ===
Vote to repeal took place in 1989, and took effect January 1, 1991. These titles originally governed financial disclosure by executive branch officials, but disclosure rules for all three branches were later consolidated into the first title.

=== Title IV ===
Title IV created the Office of Government Ethics. The Office of Government Ethics' director is appointed by the President, and approved by the Senate. The director is charged with providing direction on Executive Branch policies of disclosure, and collaborates with the Attorney General in investigations of ethics violations.

=== Title V ===
Title V restricts outside employment on people making above $120,000 a year, with adjustment for location as of 2011. Employees cannot be employed by an "entity which provides professional services involving a fiduciary relationship", have their name used by that entity, work on the board of that entity, or teach without prior authorization by the appropriate government ethics department or figure.

The bill increased length of prohibition of lobbying work in front of the agency from one year to two years.

Finally, it allows for judges to teach when not on active duty.

=== Title VI ===
Title VI amended Title 28 of the United States Code. Title VI of The Act expired on June 30, 1999. It has been permanently replaced with Title 28 (CFR), Chapter VI, Part 600.

It requires the Attorney General to investigate specific allegations of federal offenses by the President, Vice President, individuals at specified salary levels in the Executive Office of the President and the Department of Justice, any Assistant Attorney General, the Director and Deputy Director of the Central Intelligence, the Commissioner of the Internal Revenue Service, all such specified individuals who held office during the incumbency of the President or during the period the previous President held office (if such preceding President was of the same political party as the incumbent President), and any officer of the principal national campaign committee seeking the election or reelection of the President.

The Attorney General must decide if there is merit to the allegation within 90 days. If so, then the Attorney General must have a special prosecutor appointed who has all the power of the Department of Justice office except those specific to the Attorney General. The special prosecutor is chosen through a system wherein the Chief Justice of the United States appoints a panel of three judges from the Circuit Court of Appeals, one of which must be from the District of Columbia, who serve three-year terms and choose the special prosecutor. The special prosecutor has the authority to send any information that they deem relevant to the United States Congress, and can provide counsel in issues that may call for impeachment of the person under investigation.

The special prosecutor can only be removed by impeachment and conviction by Congress, or by the Attorney General for "substantial improprieties" or a physical or mental condition that affects performance.

The Department of Justice is required to suspend all investigations within the realm of the special prosecutor.

The Attorney General has the authority to declare anyone disqualified from participating in an investigation because of conflict of interest.

=== Criticism ===
Justice Antonin Scalia provided critiques of the Act, based on both Constitutional law and the potential for harm in practice, in his dissenting opinion in the case Morrison v. Olson. Scalia, a judicial conservative, noted that the U.S. Constitution granted consolidated power to enforce the law exclusively to the Executive Branch. The Act extended the power to initiate criminal investigation to the United States House of Representatives and the Senate, which Scalia viewed as a violation of the separation of powers. He believed that the House of Representatives' investigation through the use of a special prosecutor "[arose] out of a bitter power dispute between the President and the Legislative Branch".

Even some Congress members who had voted for the Act criticized it privately, leading to speculation that "if it had been an anonymous vote, it would have been voted down two-to-one". The bill's most controversial feature among Congress members was its limit on outside income, which could be no more than 15 percent of a person's public service income. This restriction applied only to "earned" income, while excluding investment income from stocks or bonds. About a half-dozen members of the House of Representatives reportedly would not speak to the Speaker of the House, Tip O'Neill, because he pushed the Act through. Their claim was that the Act favored people with "unearned" wealth–people who already had it–over people with "earned" additional income, which usually came from a law practice on the side. Democratic Representative David R. Bowen of Mississippi called the ethics climate of the time a "witch-hunt".

Specific provisions of the Act have faced criticism as being either too weak or too strong. The Special Prosecutor created by Title VI was empowered to pursue investigations with minimal evidence, and was required to pursue any accusation that the District Attorney could not disprove. It allowed for legal harassment of political opponents, even in cases that prosecutors stated they would have dropped in any other federal court. Republicans complained of abuse by Democrats during the Supreme Court case of Morrison v. Olson, and Democrats later complained that Kenneth Starr's three-and-a-half-year investigation of President Bill Clinton in the Monica Lewinsky scandal was motivated by partisanship. The Office of Government Ethics created by Title IV has been criticized on the grounds that its limited budget, leadership, and prestige are inadequate for the Office to function effectively.

Other critics complain that public disclosure involves a violation of privacy which may deter good people from public service.

== The Ethics Reform Act of 1989 ==
The Ethics Reform Act of 1989 was introduced by Representative Tom Foley (D-WA) to provide for government-wide ethics reform. Improvements to the 1978 act included civil penalties for appointees violating post-service employment regulations, and widening the net to include all employees of the Executive Department who hold a commission from the President. The act became Public Law 101-194 on November 30, 1989.

== See also ==
- STOCK Act or Stop Trading on Congressional Knowledge Act
