= Thunder Basin Coal Co. v. Reich =

- Supreme Court of the United States

Argued October 5, 1993 Decided January 19, 1994
- Full case name: Thunder Basin Coal Company v. Robert B. Reich, Secretary of Labor, et al.
- Docket no.: 92-896
- Citations: 510 U.S. 200 (more) 114 S. Ct. 771; 127 L. Ed. 2d 29

Case history
- Prior: 969 F.2d 970 (10th Cir. 1992)
- Subsequent: 56 F.3d 1275 (10th Cir. 1995)

Holding
- The Federal Mine Safety and Health Amendments Act's comprehensive administrative review scheme implicitly precludes district court jurisdiction over pre-enforcement challenges to the Act and its regulations.

Court membership
- Chief Justice William Rehnquist Associate Justices Harry Blackmun · John P. Stevens; Sandra Day O'Connor · Antonin Scalia; Anthony Kennedy · David Souter; Clarence Thomas · Ruth Bader Ginsburg

Case opinions
- Majority: Blackmun, joined by Rehnquist, Stevens, O'Connor, Kennedy, Souter, Ginsburg
- Concurrence: Scalia, joined by Thomas (except Parts III-B, IV, and V)

Laws applied
- Federal Mine Safety and Health Amendments Act of 1977; 30 U.S.C. § 801 et seq.

Thunder Basin Coal Co. v. Reich, 510 U.S. 200 (1994), was a United States Supreme Court case in which the court held that the comprehensive administrative review scheme established by the Federal Mine Safety and Health Amendments Act of 1977 implicitly precludes federal district court jurisdiction over pre-enforcement challenges to the Act and its regulations.

== Background ==
The Federal Mine Safety and Health Amendments Act of 1977 was enacted to protect the health and safety of miners by requiring periodic, unannounced inspections of mines by the Secretary of Labor. The Act grants employees' representatives "walk-around" rights during inspections, access to certain health and safety information, and a role in promoting enforcement. It authorizes the Secretary to enforce compliance through civil penalties and other sanctions, while challenges to enforcement actions are reviewed first by the independent Federal Mine Safety and Health Review Commission and then by the appropriate United States court of appeals.

Thunder Basin Coal Company, which operated a surface coal mine in Wyoming employing approximately 500 nonunion workers, filed a pre-enforcement action in the United States District Court for the District of Wyoming seeking injunctive relief. The company argued that permitting nonemployee United Mine Workers of America (UMWA) officials to serve as miners' representatives violated the National Labor Relations Act and infringed its property and associational rights under the Fifth Amendment.

The district court granted a preliminary injunction, but the United States Court of Appeals for the Tenth Circuit reversed, holding that the Mine Act's comprehensive administrative review scheme precluded pre-enforcement district court jurisdiction because the dispute concerned anticipated enforcement proceedings that Congress intended to be resolved through the Act's administrative process. The Supreme Court granted certiorari to resolve a circuit split over the jurisdictional issue.

== Legal background ==
Under the Administrative Procedure Act, courts may review a final agency action unless Congress has precluded judicial review. The Supreme Court originally required "clear and convincing evidence" that Congress intended to preclude judicial review, but it abandoned that standard in Block v. Community Nutrition Institute in favor of asking whether Congress's intent was "fairly discernible" from the statutory scheme. In Thunder Basin, the Court added a second inquiry, requiring that the statutory review scheme also provide meaningful judicial review.

== Supreme Court ==
The Supreme Court explained that courts will generally require parties to use an agency's administrative review process first when Congress's intent that they do so is clear from the statute. Whether judicial review is precluded depends on the statute's language, structure, purpose, legislative history, and whether the administrative review process ultimately provides meaningful review of the claimant's legal challenges.

Applying Block's "fairly discernible" test, the Court concluded that the Mine Act's comprehensive enforcement scheme and legislative history demonstrated Congress's intent to channel all ordinary challenges—including statutory and constitutional claims arising from enforcement proceedings—through the Act's administrative review process.

The Court then considered whether precluding district court jurisdiction would deny the plaintiff meaningful judicial review. It held that district court jurisdiction may remain available for claims that are wholly collateral to the statutory review scheme, fall outside the agency's expertise, or would otherwise be effectively unreviewable. These came to be known as the Thunder Basin factors.

Justice Antonin Scalia concurred in the judgment but rejected the view that the constitutionality of pre-enforcement review depended on whether compliance with a regulation caused irreparable harm. He wrote that “the preclusion of pre-enforcement judicial review is constitutional whether or not compliance produces irreparable harm,” so long as a summary penalty for non-compliance did not itself cause irreparable harm or judicial review was available before the penalty could be imposed.

== Later developments ==
The Fifth Circuit, in Texas v. EPA (1994), quoted Justice Scalia's concurring opinion, where he wrote that “complying with a regulation later held invalid almost always produces the irreparable harm of nonrecoverable compliance costs.”

In Free Enterprise Fund v. Public Company Accounting Oversight Board (2010), the Supreme Court applied the Thunder Basin factors, concluding that plaintiffs lacked a meaningful opportunity for judicial review because the statutory scheme provided review only of final SEC actions, while the plaintiffs challenged the constitutionality of the SEC-supervised PCAOB itself. The Court also held that these claims were wholly collateral to the statutory review scheme and fell outside the SEC's expertise.

In Elgin v. Department of the Treasury (2012), the Supreme Court held that the Thunder Basin factors favored preclusion, requiring the plaintiffs to pursue the Civil Service Reform Act's administrative review process before obtaining judicial review of their constitutional claims.
