= List of Texas state agencies =

The following is a list of Texas state agencies.

== List of agencies ==
- Angelina and Neches River Authority
- Brazos River Authority
- Canadian River Municipal Water Authority
- Cancer Prevention and Research Institute of Texas
- Edwards Aquifer Authority
- Employees Retirement System of Texas
- Executive Council of Physical Therapy and Occupational Therapy Examiners of Texas
- Guadalupe-Blanco River Authority
- Lower Colorado River Authority
- Office of the Governor of Texas
- Office of the Lieutenant Governor of Texas
- Office of the Public Utility Counsel of Texas
- Office of the State Prosecuting Attorney
- Public Utility Commission of Texas
- Railroad Commission of Texas
- Red River Authority
- Sabine River Authority (Texas)
- State Bar of Texas
- Teacher Retirement System of Texas
- Texas A&M AgriLife Research
- Texas A&M AgriLife Extension Service
- Texas A&M University System
- Texas Alcoholic Beverage Commission
- Texas Animal Health Commission
- Texas Apiary Inspection Service
- Texas Appraiser Licensing and Certification Board
- Texas Attorney General
- Texas Board of Architectural Examiners
- Texas Board of Chiropractic Examiners
- Texas Board of Nursing
- Texas Board of Pardons and Paroles
- Texas Board of Pharmacy
- Texas Board of Plumbing Examiners
- Texas Board of Podiatric Medical Examiners
- Texas Board of Professional Engineers and Land Surveyors
- Texas Board of Professional Geoscientists
- Texas Bond Review Board
- Texas Commission of State Emergency Communications
- Texas Commission on Environmental Quality
- Texas Commission on Fire Protection
- Texas Commission on Jail Standards
- Texas Commission on Judicial Conduct
- Texas Commission on Law Enforcement Officer Standards and Education
- Texas Commission on the Arts
- Texas Comptroller of Public Accounts
- Texas Council for Developmental Disabilities
- Texas Council on Competitive Government
- Texas County and District Retirement System
- Texas Court of Appeals
- Texas Court of Criminal Appeals
- Texas Credit Union Department
- Texas Cyber Command
- Texas Department of Agriculture
- Texas Department of Banking
- Texas Department of Criminal Justice
- Texas Department of Family and Protective Services
- Texas Department of Housing and Community Affairs
- Texas Department of Information Resources
- Texas Department of Insurance
- Texas Department of Licensing and Regulation
- Texas Department of Public Safety
- Texas Department of Savings and Mortgage Lending
- Texas Department of State Health Services
- Texas Department of Transportation
- Texas Division of Emergency Management
- Texas Education Agency
- Texas Engineering Experiment Station
- Texas Engineering Extension Service
- Texas Ethics Commission
- Texas Facilities Commission
- Texas Film Commission
- Texas Finance Commission
- Texas Forest Service
- Texas Funeral Service Commission
- Texas General Land Office
- Texas Health and Human Services Commission
- Texas Higher Education Coordinating Board
- Texas Historical Commission
- Texas Juvenile Justice Department
- Texas Legislative Budget Board
- Texas Legislative Council
- Texas Legislative Reference Library
- Texas Lottery Commission
- Texas Medical Board
- Texas Military Department
- Texas Music Office
- Texas Office of Consumer Credit Commissioner
- Texas Office of Court Administration
- Texas Office of Public Insurance Counsel
- Texas Office of State-Federal Relations
- Texas Optometry Board
- Texas Parks and Wildlife Department
- Texas Pension Review Board
- Texas Public Finance Authority
- Texas Racing Commission
- Texas Real Estate Commission
- Texas School for the Blind and Visually Impaired
- Texas School for the Deaf
- Texas Secretary of State
- Texas Space Commission
- Texas State Anatomical Board
- Texas State Auditor's Office
- Texas State Board of Dental Examiners
- Texas State Board for Educator Certification
- Texas State Board of Public Accountancy
- Texas State Board of Veterinary Medical Examiners
- Texas State Cemetery
- Texas State Law Library
- Texas State Library and Archives Commission
- Texas State Office of Administrative Hearings
- Texas State Office of Risk Management
- Texas State Preservation Board
- Texas State Securities Board
- Texas State Soil and Water Conservation Board
- Texas State Technical College System
- Texas State University System
- Texas Sunset Advisory Commission
- Texas Tech University System
- Texas Veterans Commission
- Texas Veterans Land Board
- Texas Water Development Board
- Texas Wildlife Services
- Texas Workforce Commission
- Trinity River Authority
- University of Houston System
- University of North Texas System
- University of Texas System
