= William P. Hobby Jr. State Office Building =

William P. Hobby, Jr. State Office Building
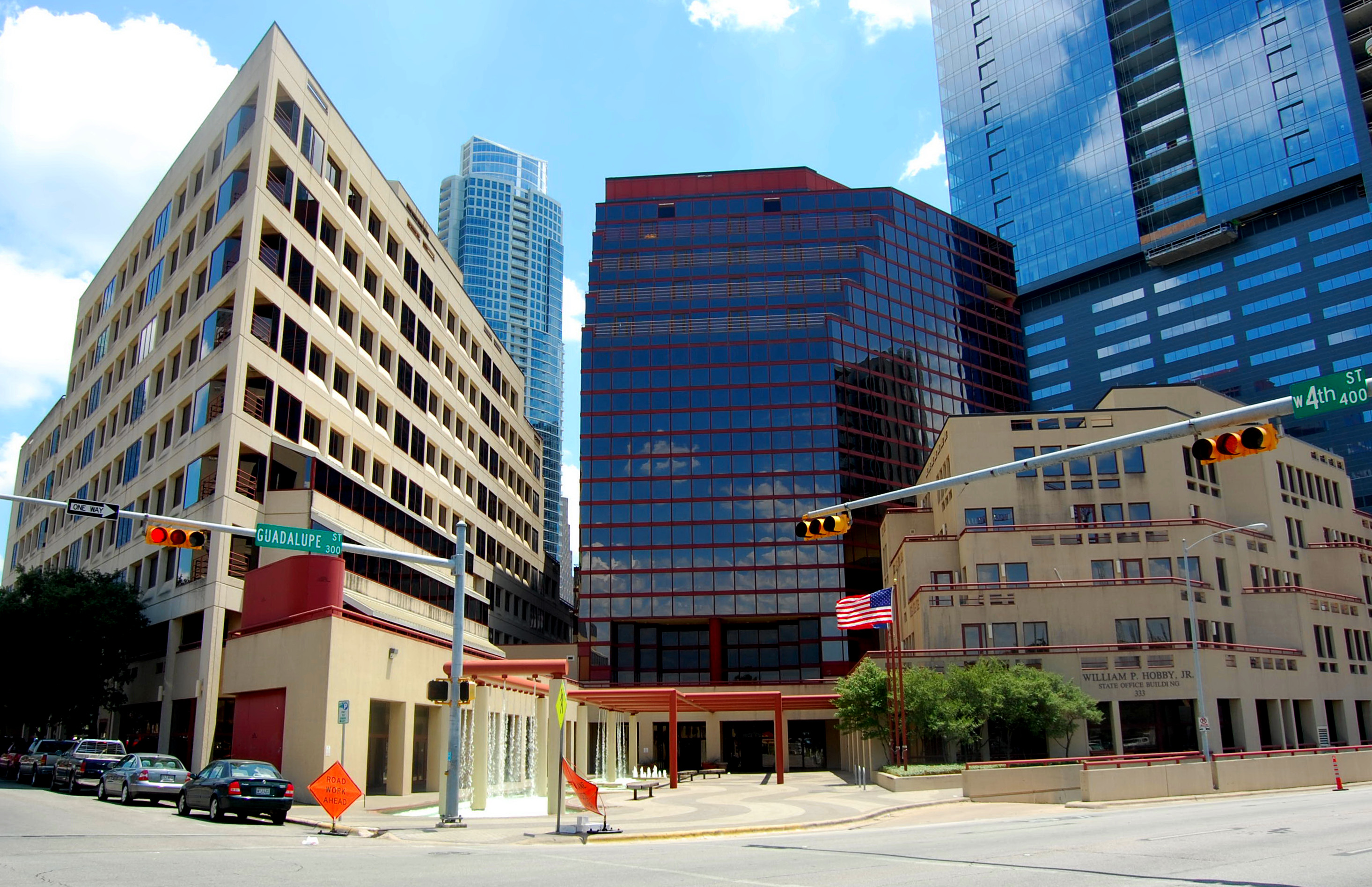

General information
- Type: Government
- Location: 333 Guadalupe Street, Austin, Texas, U.S.
- Coordinates: 30.26664443385169°N 97.74622051283204°W
- Construction started: 1983
- Completed: 1986
- Cost: US$54 million
- Owner: Government of Texas

Height
- Roof: 177 ft (54 m)

Technical details
- Floor count: 13; 9; 5
- Floor area: 378,000 ft^{2} (35,100 m^{2})

Design and construction
- Architects: Rosetti Architects; Holt-Fatter-Scott; WZMH Architects
- Developer: Watson-Casey Companies

The William P. Hobby, Jr. State Office Building - formerly known as Republic Plaza - is a three-building government office complex located in the Warehouse District of Downtown Austin, Texas, United States. The building complex housed numerous Texas Texas state agencies, including the Texas Department of Insurance, Texas Medical Board, Texas State Board of Examiners of Psychologists and the Texas State Board of Dental Examiners. The complex is named for former Lieutenant Governor William P. Hobby Jr.

== Architecture ==
The complex contains three distinct postmodern towers. Tower one, designed by the Dallas-based Rossetti Associates, is clad in a bronze-tinted glass curtain wall with red mullion stripes; Tower two, designed by architecture firm Holt-Fatter-Scott, is a pueblo revival style building with a stucco facade; and Tower three, designed by WZMH Architects, is designed with concrete wall panels. The complex features an outdoor plaza which originally featured a large water feature consisting of a large pool covered by a red pipe trellis that sprayed water downward into the pool. After years of mechanical failures, the water feature was removed and the plaza was renovated in 2018; the pools were filled in with styrofoam blocks and covered with benches and planters, while the trellis' water system was repurposed to provide irrigation for the planters.

== History ==
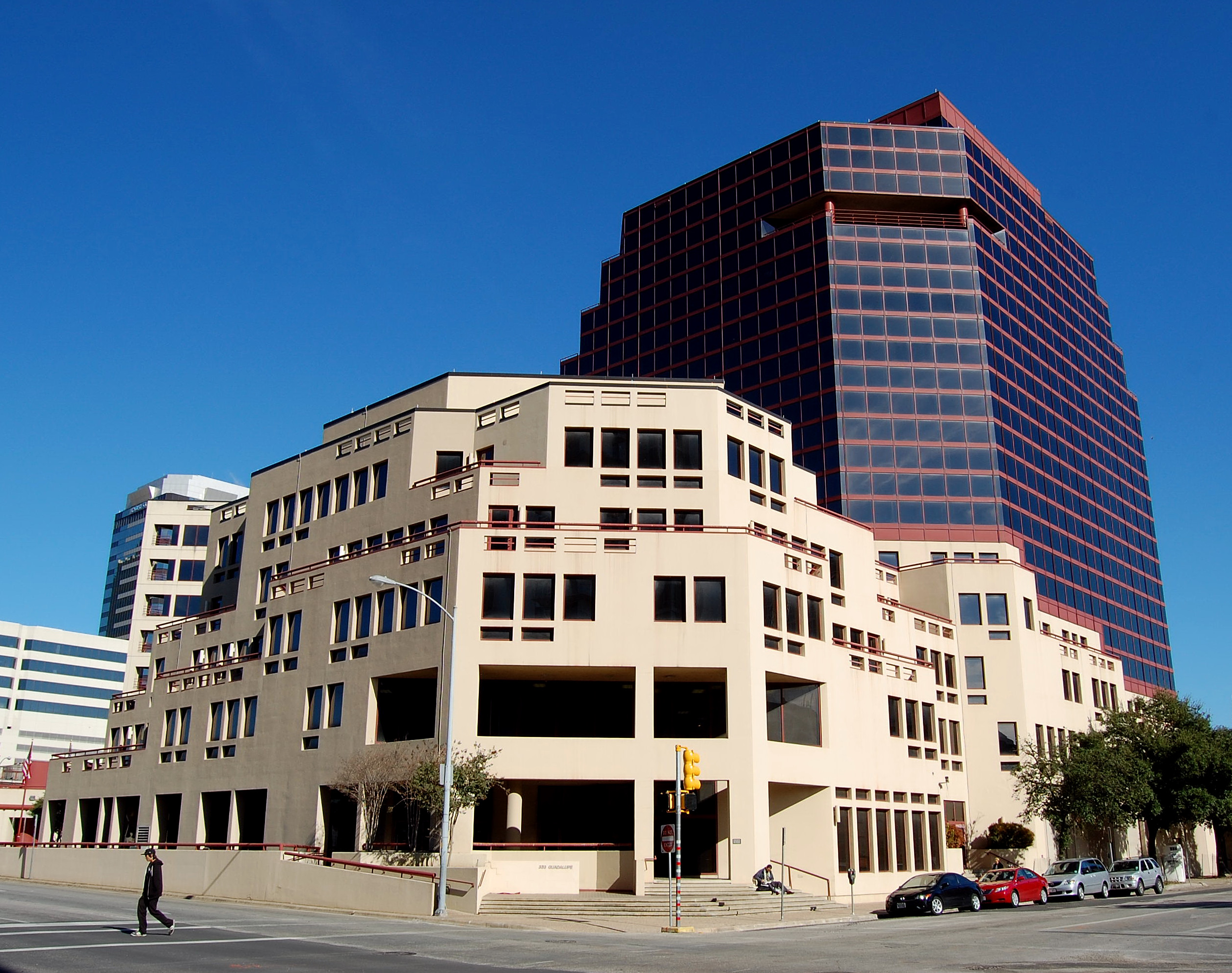
Looking from the corner of W 3rd Street and Guadalupe Street

The complex, originally named Republic Plaza, was developed by Austin developers Watson-Casey Companies, originally envisioned as the first phase of a 60-acre urban renewal project for Austin's Warehouse District. The unbuilt redevelopment's master plan, designed by urban planner Denise Scott Brown, would have included a new city hall for the city of Austin and a new location for the Laguna Gloria art museum, designed by architect Robert Venturi.

The complex was originally built for private offices with ground-floor retail but had trouble attracting leases following the late-1980s Savings and Loan Crisis. In 1987, the First Republic Bank Corporation foreclosed on the complex. The developers, Watson-Casey had sought to attract the City of Austin to lease the building, first for the Electric Department, then for the Water and Wastewater Department, and later for a lease purchase contract to use the complex as a temporary city hall, all of which fell through. In 1990, the complex was purchased by the State of Texas and was renamed the William P. Hobby, Jr. State Office Building.

In 2019, it was revealed that the complex was in need of up to $50 million in repairs and contained a rat infestation. The Texas Facilities Commission spent over $14 million since 2008 on repairs including new fire alarms, electrical systems, a new emergency generator, renovated elevators, and a new HVAC system. Texas State Senator Kirk Watson and Representative Gina Hinojosa proposed a bill to allow the complex to be auctioned off.

In August 2023, the Texas General Land Office and the City of Austin Mayor Kirk Watson announced a plan to redevelop the Hobby complex into workforce housing. The complex would ideally include a housing resource office, a childcare facility, and retail space. The government procurement bidding process for this project began in August 2023, with the proposal of Hines ultimately being selected.

== Reception ==
Upon the completion of the complex, Austin American-Statesman architecture critic Michael McCullar criticized the buildings' mismatched designs, saying that "bringing in three separate architecture firms to produce three separate "identities" for the complex may have diluted its architectural impact", and comparing the outdoor water feature to a "punctured radiator". During a Texas Senate Finance Committee meeting in 2019, then-Senator Kirk Watson said that the complex “is an embarrassment (and) it’s a joke — in any other universe it wouldn’t exist.”
