= OCCC =

OCCC may refer to:

== Education ==
- Oklahoma City Community College, a two-year college in Oklahoma City, Oklahoma, United States
- Orange County Community College, a two-year college in Orange County, New York, United States
- Oregon Coast Community College, a two-year college in Newport, Oregon, United States

== Government ==
- Ohio Casino Control Commission, the gaming control board for casinos in Ohio
- Oahu Community Correctional Center, a jail in Hawaii
- Texas Office of Consumer Credit Commissioner, a Texas state agency

== Places ==
- Orange County Convention Center, in Orlando, Florida
