= Texas State Office of Administrative Hearings =

The Texas State Office of Administrative Hearings (SOAH) was created in 1991 by the 72nd Texas Legislature as an independent agency to manage and conduct hearings in contested cases for most licensing and other state agencies. SOAH provides a forum for administrative hearings for agencies without staff to conduct hearings. SOAH derives its authority from Texas Government Code Chapters 2001 and 2003. The Texas legislature empowered administrative law judges (ALJs) employed by SOAH to administer oaths, take testimony, rule on questions of evidence, issue orders relating to discovery and other hearing or pre-hearing matters, and issue proposals for decision including findings of fact and conclusions of law. By statute, SOAH is a state agency; it has statewide jurisdiction, makes its own rules, and determines contested cases. The Texas Legislature clarified SOAH was not an Article 5, Section 1 court, but instead was "created to serve as an independent forum for the conduct of adjudicative hearings in the executive branch of state government." The purpose of SOAH is "to separate the adjudicative function from the investigative, prosecutorial, and policymaking functions in the executive branch in relation to the hearings that the office is authorized to conduct."

SOAH currently conducts hearings for approximately 60 state agencies, including the Public Utility Commission, Texas Commission on Environmental Quality, Texas Department of Insurance, Employees Retirement System, Texas Alcoholic Beverage Commission, Texas Medical Board, Texas Department of Agriculture, Texas Commission on Law Enforcement, Texas Board of Chiropractic Examiners, Texas Board of Dental Examiners, and other licensing and regulatory agencies.
