= William P. Hobby Jr. =

American politician (born 1932)

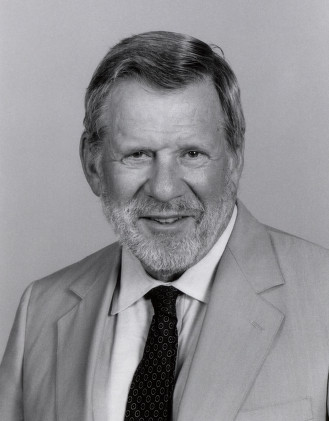
- Hobby in 1995

5th Chancellor of the University of Houston System
- In office 1995–1997
- Preceded by: Alexander F. Schilt
- Succeeded by: Arthur K. Smith

17th Chair of the National Lieutenant Governors Association
- In office 1976–1977
- Preceded by: Eugene Bookhammer
- Succeeded by: Robert D. Orr

37th Lieutenant Governor of Texas
- In office January 16, 1973 – January 15, 1991
- Governor: Dolph Briscoe; Bill Clements; Mark White; Bill Clements
- Preceded by: Ben Barnes
- Succeeded by: Bob Bullock

Personal details
- Born: William Pettus Hobby Jr. January 19, 1932 (age 94) Houston, Texas, U.S.
- Party: Democratic
- Spouse: Diana Poteat Stallings (died 2014)
- Children: 4
- Parents: William P. Hobby (father); Oveta Culp Hobby (mother)
- Education: Rice University (BA)
- Website: Official website

Military service
- Allegiance: United States
- Branch/service: United States Navy
- Years of service: 1953–1957
- Rank: Lieutenant (JG)

William Pettus Hobby Jr. (born January 19, 1932) is an American politician who served a record eighteen years as the 37th lieutenant governor of Texas, from 1973 to 1991. He was the last lieutenant governor to serve a two-year term and the first elected to a four-year term, following the amendment to the Texas Constitution that lengthened terms for statewide elected officeholders to four years, effective with the 1974 elections.

== Early life ==
Hobby was born in Houston, Texas, the only son of William P. Hobby Sr. and Oveta Culp Hobby. Both of his grandfathers were in the Texas Legislature. His father was also a lieutenant governor of Texas and the governor from 1917 to 1921, and his mother was the first person appointed to the new position of United States Secretary of Health, Education, and Welfare by U.S. President Dwight D. Eisenhower, a Republican. She served in that position, now the United States Department of Health and Human Services, from 1953 to 1955.

Hobby attended high school at St. Albans School in Washington, D.C., he then attended Rice University in Houston. After graduating in 1953 with a Bachelor of Arts, he served in the United States Navy for four years in naval intelligence.

For many years, the Hobby family owned the now-defunct Houston Post, at which Hobby worked. He worked his way through the editorial department. When his father became ill in 1963, Hobby assumed editorial and managerial control of the newspaper. He remained president of the Post for twenty years – until the family sold the newspaper in 1983. It was absorbed in 1995 by the Houston Chronicle, which is still published.

== Political career ==
Hobby's lengthy career in government began in 1959, when he served as parliamentarian of the Texas Senate under Lieutenant Governor Ben Ramsey. He was appointed to the Presidential Task Force on Suburban Problems and to the National Citizens Advisory Committee on Vocational Rehabilitation by U.S. President Lyndon B. Johnson. Governor Preston Smith appointed him to the Texas Air Control Board. Lieutenant Governor Ben Barnes appointed him chair of the Senate Interim Committee on Welfare Reform in 1969. Hobby resigned from the Texas Air Control Board in 1971 to run for lieutenant governor.

=== Lieutenant Governor of Texas ===
Hobby was elected lieutenant governor in November 1972 with 93 percent of the statewide vote, having defeated token opposition, not from a Republican but from the Hispanic former third party, Raza Unida, which ran Alma Canales of Edinburg even though she did not meet the age requirement for the office. The position had opened when the two-term incumbent, Ben Barnes, ran unsuccessfully in the Democratic gubernatorial primary and finished in third place. Hobby was an easy winner in most of his elections, including a high-profile race in 1982 in which he defeated the Republican nominee George Strake Jr., also a Houston businessman, a former Secretary of State of Texas, and later the Republican state chairman. Hobby was re-elected in 1974 (when the term was extended to four years), defeating Republican Gaylord Marshall. Hobby polled 1,170,253 votes (74 percent) to Marshall's 379,108 (24 percent) and in their 1978 rematch with Hobby polling 1,434,613 votes (64.91 percent) to Marshall's 760,642 votes (34.42 percent), 1982 defeating Strake with Hobby polling 1,830,870 votes (58.35 percent) to Strake's 1,272,644 votes (40.56 percent), and 1986 defeating David Davidson with Hobby polling 2,032,781 votes (61.37 percent) to Davidson's 1,231,858 votes (37.19 percent). Hobby did not seek an unprecedented sixth term in 1990, and the lieutenant governorship passed to fellow Democrat then-Comptroller Bob Bullock on January 15, 1991.

In addition to presiding over the state senate, Hobby served in numerous other leadership capacities within the political sphere. These included appointments as chair of the Governor's Energy Advisory Council (GEAC) (1973–1977), the Texas Energy Advisory Council (TEAC) (1977–1979), the special advisory committee which recommended the Texas Sunset Act (1970s), and the Joint Advisory Committee on Educational Services to the Deaf (1976–1979); co-chair of the Texas Energy and Natural Resource Advisory Council (TENRAC) (1979–1983); vice-chair of the Criminal Justice Policy Council; ex officio member of the Texas Advisory Commission on Intergovernmental Relations; and member of the Select Committee on Public Education (1983–1984). He was also chair of the National Conference of Lieutenant Governors in 1974. In 1985, he joined the mental health activist, Helen J. Farabee of Wichita Falls, in convincing the legislature to create the Department of Mental Health Mental Retardation, known as MHMR.

"Over his years as Lieutenant Governor, Hobby gained a reputation as an astute fiscal manager and parliamentary leader in the Texas Senate," according to a biographical sketch in the state archives.

"Some of the highlights of Hobby's years as Lieutenant Governor included reforms in the appropriations process such as zero-based budgeting, which required agencies to justify their budgets regardless of previous budget levels, and a requirement that the fiscal impact of bills be determined and reported to the Legislature in advance of passage. Also passed during his tenure were the indigent health care plan, the Texas water plan, and the school finance bill of 1984 that redistributed state funds among the state's school districts, required teacher testing, and created the controversial 'no-pass-no-play' rule."

Shortly after Deng Xiaoping's 1979 visit to the United States, Hobby traveled to China and signed a deal through which China began selling crude oil to Houston-area refineries.

== After politics ==
Hobby served as Chancellor of the University of Houston System from 1995 to 1997. He told Texas Monthly's Paul Burka that he had never expected the call.

Additionally, Hobby remained active in the business world. He served on the boards of directors for various firms, including Southwest Airlines, a position he held for seventeen years. He was a Trustee of the LBJ Foundation. He held the Sid Richardson Chair in Public Affairs at the LBJ School of Public Affairs and was also the Radoslav Andrea Tsanoff Professor at Rice University. He continued to be active in civic affairs as a commissioner for the Texas Parks and Wildlife Department. In 2010, he published a book, How Things Really Work: Lessons from a Life in Politics. This book was produced as an audiobook by Assistive Media for the Texas Talking Book Program to serve Texans with blindness or visual, physical, or reading disabilities.

== Personal life ==
He was married to the former Diana Poteat Stallings until her death on July 4, 2014, and is the father of Laura Poteat Hobby Beckworth, Paul William Hobby, Andrew Purefoy Hobby, and Katherine Pettus Hobby Gibson. Diana Hobby was associate editor of Studies in English Literature as well as book editor of The Houston Post. As a couple, they were strong supporters of the arts and literature, with a particular fondness for libraries. Democrat Paul Hobby attempted to extend the family's public service into a fourth generation; however, he narrowly lost the race for Texas Comptroller of Public Accounts in 1998 to the Republican nominee, Carole Keeton Strayhorn.

== Legacy ==
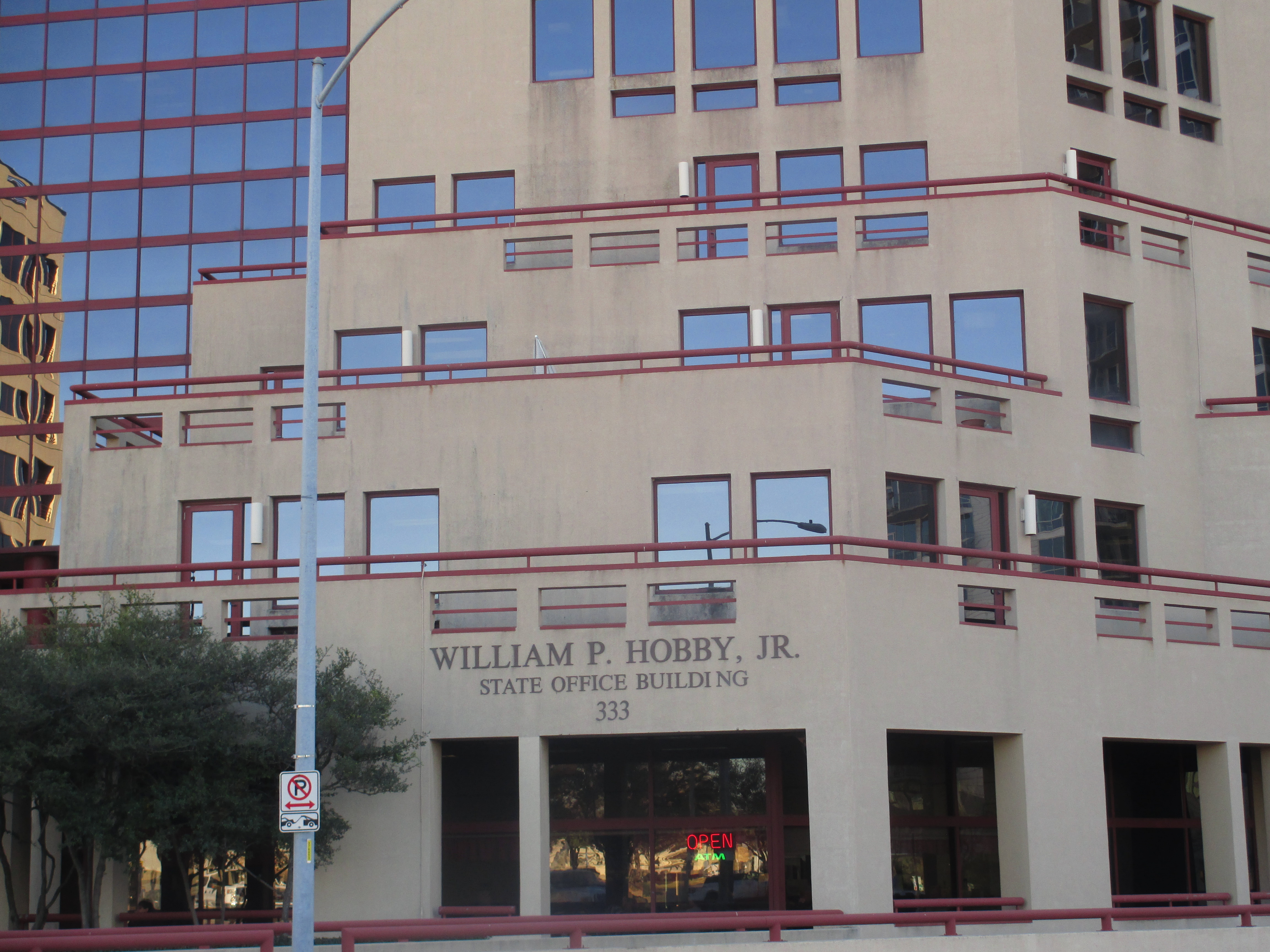
William P. Hobby, Jr. State Office Building at 333 Guadalupe Street in downtown Austin, Texas

On May 5, 1989, Hobby was honored by the Texas state senate.

The William P. Hobby, Jr. State Office Building in Austin was named in his honor. It housed the Texas Department of Insurance until 2022.

The Hobby School of Public Affairs at the University of Houston, and the Hobby Center for the Performing Arts are named in honor of Hobby and his family. Diana American Grill, the on-site restaurant at the Hobby Center, is named for Hobby's wife, Diana.

== See also ==
- Hobby–Eberly Telescope

Party political offices
Preceded by Ben Barnes	Democratic nominee for Lieutenant Governor of Texas; 1972, 1974, 1978, 1982, 1986	Succeeded by Bob Bullock
Academic offices
Preceded by Alexander F. Schilt	Chancellor of the University of Houston System; 1995–1997	Succeeded by Arthur K. Smith
Political offices
Preceded by Ben Barnes	Lieutenant Governor of Texas; 1973–1991	Succeeded by Bob Bullock
