= Administrative law judge =

Judge and trier of fact

An administrative law judge (ALJ) in the United States is a judge and trier of fact who both presides over trials and adjudicates claims or disputes involving administrative law—that is, involving administrative units of the executive branch of government. ALJs can administer oaths, take testimony, rule on questions of evidence, and make factual and legal determinations. The term refers only to a quasi-judicial official who decides claims or disputes under the formal provisions of the Administrative Procedure Act governing adjudication, and "it is not (as many law students mistakenly assume) a generic phrase that can be used to describe any agency adjudicator".

In the United States, the United States Supreme Court has recognized that the role of a federal administrative law judge is "functionally comparable" to that of an Article III judge. An ALJ's powers are often, if not generally, comparable to those of a trial judge, as ALJs may issue subpoenas, rule on proffers of evidence, regulate the course of the hearing, and make or recommend decisions. However, because of the strict separation of powers imposed by the federal Constitution, ALJs are always regarded as members of the executive branch, not the judicial branch. Unlike true judges in the judicial branch, ALJs lack broad subject-matter jurisdiction and are limited to the jurisdiction conferred upon their home agency by its governing statutes.

Depending upon the agency's jurisdiction, proceedings may have complex multiparty adjudication, as is the case with the Federal Energy Regulatory Commission, or simplified and less formal procedures, as is the case with the Social Security Administration.

== History ==
The officials now known as ALJs were referred to as "hearing examiners" in the original text of the Administrative Procedure Act of 1946 (APA). At the time, there was widespread dissatisfaction among Americans who had dealt directly with the federal government with the lack of uniformity in procedure among federal agencies in terms of how they appointed "hearing officers" (and many other officials with similar titles), and the procedures by which such officials heard and decided claims within each agency's jurisdiction. The point of the APA's adjudicative provisions was to bring about procedural uniformity and to impose "a rather prescriptive (albeit not inflexible) set of formal hearing procedures".

The number of hearing examiners grew "from 196 in June 1947 to 278 in June 1954, 494 in July 1962, and 792 in February 1974".

The phrase "hearing examiner" had a bureaucratic connotation which some people felt did not convey the adjudicative nature of the hearing examiners' role or give the officer enough clout. In 1972, the Civil Service Commission invented the phrase "administrative law judge" by creating an administrative regulation that redefined the title of hearing examiners, and executive agencies started using the title without congressional approval or a statutory prescription. However, in 1978, Congress formally amended the APA to replace "hearing examiner" with "administrative law judge", which legitimized the title, despite the fact that the specific phrase "administrative law" was not (and is still not) defined or codified by any federal statute in the United States.

The number of ALJs continued to rise to 1,183 in October 1982, but then their growth slowed significantly, reaching only 1,333 in March 1996. Nearly all this growth occurred in the Social Security Administration.

The original intent of the APA's drafters was that it would cover nearly all agency adjudications, but that objective was never achieved. During the 1980s, one reason for why many agencies started to get away with conducting adjudications outside the APA with non-ALJ adjudicators is that they exploited the broad deference afforded to their interpretation of their governing statutes by Chevron U.S.A., Inc. v. Natural Resources Defense Council, Inc. (1984).

In a 1996 article, Jeffrey Lubbers identified a tendency among many federal agencies to rely upon non-ALJ adjudicators rather than ALJs. He attributed this to three issues: "cost, restrictions on their selection, and their effective immunity from performance management." First, at the time, a ALJ's starting salary was $75,205, while a non-ALJ started at $41,404. Second, ALJs were subject to strict civil service rules which included a rigid candidate ranking process overly weighted towards veterans and any kind of litigation experience (without distinguishing between different types of litigation). These rules denied agency executives the flexibility to prioritize non-veteran ALJ candidates with actual experience in litigating the specific laws which the agency was charged with enforcing. Third, ALJs are generally exempt from the first-year probationary period and performance ratings applied to most federal employees, and the rule that ALJs can be terminated only "for cause" means that it is extremely difficult to terminate ALJs for low productivity.

Since then, the ALJ corps has continued to grow relatively slowly, while the number of non-ALJ adjudicators has skyrocketed. A 2018 study found that there were approximately 1,931 ALJs and 10,831 non-ALJ adjudicators.

== Federal appointment and tenure ==
The APA requires that federal ALJs be appointed based on scores achieved in a comprehensive testing procedure, including a four-hour written examination and an oral examination before a panel that includes an Office of Personnel Management representative, an American Bar Association representative, and a sitting federal ALJ.

In American administrative law, ALJs are Article I judges under the U.S. Constitution. As such, they do not exercise full judicial power, essentially, the power over life, liberty, and property. Article I (legislative) judges and courts are not constrained to rendering opinions for only a "case or controversy" before them and may render advisory opinions on a purely prospective basis, such as, e.g., Congressional reference cases assigned to the Court of Federal Claims. Agency ALJs do not have the power to offer such advisory opinions, as it would be in violation of the power afforded them under the Administrative Procedure Act, 5 U.S.C. §557. Unlike the agency, ALJs are not policy or rule makers.

ALJs are generally considered to be part of the executive branch, not the judicial branch, but the APA is designed to guarantee the decisional independence of ALJs. They have absolute immunity from liability for their judicial acts and are triers of fact "insulated from political influence". Federal administrative law judges are not responsible to, or subject to, the supervision or direction of employees or agents of the federal agency engaged in the performance of investigative or prosecution functions for the agency. Ex parte communications are prohibited. ALJs are exempt from performance ratings, evaluation, and bonuses. 5 CFR 930.206. Agency officials may not interfere with their decision-making, and administrative law judges may be discharged only for good cause based upon a complaint filed by the agency with the Merit Systems Protection Board (MSPB) established and determined after an APA hearing on the record before an MSPB ALJ. Only ALJs receive these statutory protections; "hearing officers" or "trial examiners", with delegated hearing functions, are not similarly protected by the APA.

In Lucia v. SEC, decided in June 2018, the Supreme Court held that ALJs are Inferior Officers within the meaning of the Appointments Clause of the United States Constitution. This means that they must be appointed by the president or by heads of departments (but without also requiring Senate advice and consent, unless Congress amends the law to require that).

=== Attorney Advisors ===
ALJs usually hire Attorney Advisors, who serve a role similar to judicial law clerks of Article III judges. For example, Attorney Advisors assist the ALJs with research, writing, drafting of opinions and orders, and assisting with the administration of hearings and other trial-like adjudications. Furthermore, Attorney Advisors usually have practiced as lawyers in the particular field which the ALJ possesses expertise in.

== Authority and review of federal ALJs ==
The United States Supreme Court has recognized that the role of a federal administrative law judge is "functionally comparable" to that of an Article III judge. An ALJ's powers are often, if not generally, comparable to those of a trial judge: an ALJ may issue subpoenas, rule on proffers of evidence, regulate the course of the hearing, and make or recommend decisions. ALJs are limited as they have no power to sanction unless a statute provides such a power. Instead, the ALJ may refer a matter to an Article III Court to seek enforcement or sanctions. The process of agency adjudication is currently structured so as to assure that ALJs exercise independent judgment on the evidence before them, free from pressures by the parties or other officials within the agency.

The procedure for reviewing an ALJ's decision varies depending upon the agency. Agencies generally have an internal appellate body, with some agencies having a Cabinet secretary decide the final internal appeals. Moreover, after the internal agency appeals have been exhausted, a party may have the right to file an appeal in the state or federal courts. Relevant statutes usually require a party to exhaust all administrative appeals before they are allowed to sue an agency in court.

== Central panels ==
Administrative law judges may be employed by a "central panel" organization, which provides the judges with independence from agencies. The California Administrative Procedure Act created an early central panel in 1945, and it served as a model for other states. By 2015, over half of states had created such panels.

== State ALJs ==
Most U.S. states have a statute modeled after the APA. In some states, such as New Jersey, the state law is also known as the Administrative Procedure Act.

Unlike federal ALJs, whose powers are guaranteed by federal statute, state ALJs have widely varying power and prestige. In some state law contexts, ALJs have almost no power; their decisions are accorded practically no deference and become, in effect, recommendations. In some cities, ALJs are at-will employees of the agency, making their decisional independence potentially questionable. In some agencies, ALJs dress like lawyers in business suits, share offices, and hold hearings in ordinary conference rooms. In other agencies (especially certain offices of the Division of Workers' Compensation of the California Department of Industrial Relations), ALJs wear robes like Article III judges, are referred to as "Honorable" and "Your Honor", work in private chambers, hold hearings in special "hearing rooms" that look like small courtrooms, and have court clerks who swear in witnesses. State ALJs can be generalists or specialize in specific fields of law, such as tax law.

== Professional organizations ==
Professional organizations that represent federal ALJs include the Federal Administrative Law Judges Conference, the Association of Administrative Law Judges, which represents only Social Security ALJs, and the Forum of United States Administrative Law judges. Professional organizations that include both state and federal ALJs include the National Association of Administrative Law Judiciary, the ABA National Conference of Administrative Law Judiciary, and the National Association of Hearing Officials.

== Case law ==
The constitutionality of the use of ALJs by executive branch administrative agencies has become the subject of frequent challenges in judicial branch courts during the early 21st century. In Lucia v. SEC (2018), the U.S. Supreme Court ruled that ALJs are officers of the United States and thus subject to the Appointments Clause of the Constitution—requiring their appointment to be made by the President or an otherwise delegated officer—but they do not require Senate confirmation as they are merely considered "inferior" officers. In 2023, the case of SEC v. Jarkesy raised the issues of whether the use of ALJ factfinding as a replacement for a jury trial violates the Seventh Amendment and the nondelegation doctrine. In June 2024, the U.S. Supreme Court ruled by a 6-3 majority that the SEC's use of ALJs in administrative proceedings for regulatory violations analogous to securities fraud violates the Seventh Amendment because there was a right to a jury trial in fraud actions at common law, then refused to decide any other issues.

While Lucia and Jarkesy were specifically focused on the SEC, there are other pending cases in lower-level courts (such as those brought by SpaceX and Trader Joe's) which brought similar challenges to the National Labor Relations Board's use of ALJs. At least one court has ruled that the challenges would "neuter" the National Labor Relations Act and are unlikely to succeed, and that the National Labor Relations Board's use of ALJs is likely constitutional.

== International comparisons ==
The United States does not have administrative courts in the judicial branch. In contrast, in the United Kingdom the Tribunals, Courts and Enforcement Act 2007 recognises legally qualified members of the national system of administrative law tribunals as members of the judiciary of the United Kingdom who are guaranteed judicial independence.

ALJs cannot be recognized as members of the judicial branch of government (without first completely ejecting them from their home agencies in the executive branch), because to do so would violate the bedrock principle of separation of powers as embodied in the U.S. Constitution. In a 2013 majority opinion signed by Associate Justice Antonin Scalia, the U.S. Supreme Court explained:

The dissent overstates when it claims that agencies exercise "legislative power" and "judicial power" ... The former is vested exclusively in Congress ... the latter in the "one supreme Court" and "such inferior Courts as the Congress may from time to time ordain and establish" ... Agencies make rules ... and conduct adjudications ... and have done so since the beginning of the Republic. These activities take "legislative" and "judicial" forms, but they are exercises of—indeed, under our constitutional structure they must be exercises of—the "executive Power."

== List of U.S. federal agencies with ALJs ==
Most of the agencies below have only a few dozen ALJs. In 2013, the Social Security Administration (SSA) had by far the largest number of ALJs at over 1,400, who adjudicate over 700,000 cases each year. The average SSA hearing process occurs over a period of 373 days.

- Commodity Futures Trading Commission
- Department of Agriculture
- Department of Energy
- Department of Health and Human Services/Department Appeals Board
- Department of Health and Human Services/Office of Medicare Hearings and Appeals
- Department of Housing and Urban Development
- Department of the Interior
- Department of Justice
  - Executive Office for Immigration Review
- Department of Labor
- Department of Transportation
- Department of Veterans Affairs
- Drug Enforcement Administration
- Environmental Protection Agency
- Federal Aviation Administration
- Federal Communications Commission
- Federal Energy Regulatory Commission
- Federal Labor Relations Authority
- Federal Maritime Commission
- Federal Mine Safety and Health Review Commission
- Federal Reserve Board of Governors
- Federal Trade Commission
- Food and Drug Administration
- General Services Administration
- International Trade Commission
- Merit Systems Protection Board
- National Labor Relations Board
- National Transportation Safety Board
- Nuclear Regulatory Commission
- Occupational Safety and Health Review Commission
- Office of Financial Institution Adjudication
- Patent and Trademark Office
- United States Coast Guard
- United States Postal Service
- Securities and Exchange Commission
- Small Business Administration
- Social Security Administration

Other federal agencies may request the U.S. Office of Personnel Management to lend them Administrative Law Judges from other federal agencies for a period of up to six months.

== List of state departments and agencies with ALJs ==
Some states, such as California, follow the federal model of having a separate corps of ALJs attached to each agency that uses them. Others, such as New Jersey, have consolidated all ALJs together into a single agency that holds hearings on behalf of all other state agencies. This type of state adjudicatory agency is called a "central panel agency". Many states have a central panel agency, but the agency does not handle all the hearings for every state agency.

- Alabama Department of Revenue
- Alaska Office of Administrative Hearings
- Arizona
  - Arizona Office of Administrative Hearings
  - Industrial Commission of Arizona
- California
  - California Department of Consumer Affairs
  - California Department of Health Services
  - California Department of Industrial Relations
  - California Department of Social Services
  - California Employment Development Department
  - California Department of Developmental Services
    - Office of Administrative Hearings web page
    - Fair Hearings Complaint process web page
  - California Office of Tax Appeals
  - California Public Utilities Commission
  - California State Personnel Board
- Colorado
  - Colorado Office of Administrative Courts
  - Colorado Public Utilities Commission
- Connecticut Workers' Compensation Commission
- Florida Division of Administrative Hearings
- Georgia Office of State Administrative Hearings
- Idaho Office of Administrative Hearings
- Illinois Human Rights Commission
- Indiana Department of Workforce Development
- Iowa
  - Iowa Department of Corrections
  - Iowa Department of Inspections and Appeals-Division of Administrative Hearings (does hearings for some but not all state agencies)
  - Iowa Workforce Development Department
- Louisiana Division of Administrative Law
- Maryland
  - Maryland Office of Administrative Hearings
  - Maryland Public Service Commission (hearings for public utility cases)
- Massachusetts
  - Massachusetts Executive Office of Transportation
  - Massachusetts Department of Environmental Protection
- Michigan State Office of Administrative Hearings and Rules
- Minnesota Office of Administrative Hearings (does hearings for some but not all state agencies)
- Mississippi Department of Employment Security, Office of the Governor
- New Jersey Office of Administrative Law (does hearings for all state agencies)
- New York
  - New York City Office of Administrative Trials and Hearings (does hearings for some but not all city agencies)
  - New York City Department of Finance (hearings for parking violations)
  - New York State Department of Environmental Conservation
  - New York State Department of Labor
  - New York State Department of Motor Vehicles Traffic Violations Bureau
  - New York State Department of State
  - New York State Office of Temporary and Disability Assistance
- North Carolina Office of Administrative Hearings
- Oklahoma Workers' Compensation Court Commission
- Pennsylvania
  - Pennsylvania Department of Insurance
  - Pennsylvania Department of Labor and Industry, Bureau of Workers' Compensation
  - Pennsylvania Liquor Control Board
  - Pennsylvania Public Utility Commission
- South Carolina Administrative Law Court (does hearings for all state agencies)
- Texas
  - Texas Department of Banking
  - Texas Finance Commission
  - Texas Health and Human Services Commission
  - Railroad Commission of Texas
  - Texas State Office of Administrative Hearings (does hearings for only some state agencies)
- Vermont Department of Labor
- Washington Office of Administrative Hearings (does hearings for all state agencies plus some local ones)
- West Virginia
  - West Virginia Public Employees Grievance Board
  - West Virginia Public Service Commission
  - West Virginia Insurance Commission (Workers Compensation)

== See also ==
- Federal tribunals in the United States
- Federal judiciary of the United States
- Administrative court
