= Aunt Ruby's Sweet Jazz Babies =

American traditional jazz band

- Origin: Austin, Texas
- Genres: Traditional jazz
- Members: Grand General Ryan J. Gould, Tartan Purry, King Crazy Oliver Steck, Mark "Speedy" Gonzales, Professor Joseph Cordi, Frank Lee Devine

Aunt Ruby's Sweet Jazz Babies is an Austin, Texas-based traditional jazz band. Their primary focus is performing music widely popular from the 1910s -1940's era. They perform in a style that has been described as a combination of the jazz stylings of Eddie Condon, Jack Teagarden, Edmond Hall, Thomas "Fats" Waller and the Hoosier Hotshots. They are recognized by the State of Texas Governor's Music Office.

The "Engine Room", an Austin, Texas classic jazz dance venue promotes the band as the "darlings of many a venue for sophisticated soirees and delightful dances."

== Band members ==
- Grand General Ryan J. Gould: String Bass
- Tartan Purry: Clarinet and Saxophone
- King Crazy Oliver Steck: Trumpet and Accordion
- Mark "Speedy" Gonzales: Trombone
- Professor Joseph Cordi: Piano and Accordion
- Frank Lee Devine: Guitar

Various members of the band perform free-lance in other Austin area bands and have also received recognition for their efforts in those bands:

- Mark "Speedy" Gonzales was awarded a Grammy Award in year 2011 for his work with "Grupo Fantasma".
- King Crazy Oliver Steck was awarded Austin Music Awards "Best Miscellaneous Instrument" in year 2009 by The Austin Chronicle
- Tartan Purry, reportedly performing under the pseudonym of Jonathan Doyle, was nominated for a Grammy in year 2009 for his efforts with Willie Nelson and Asleep at the Wheel.

The band also performs with a variety of special guest members.

== Discography ==
- "Stompin' Through The Tulips" (2006)
- "Unleash The Love" (2015)
- "It Can Be Yours" (2016)
