= Ocie Speer =

American jurist and writer (1869–1959)

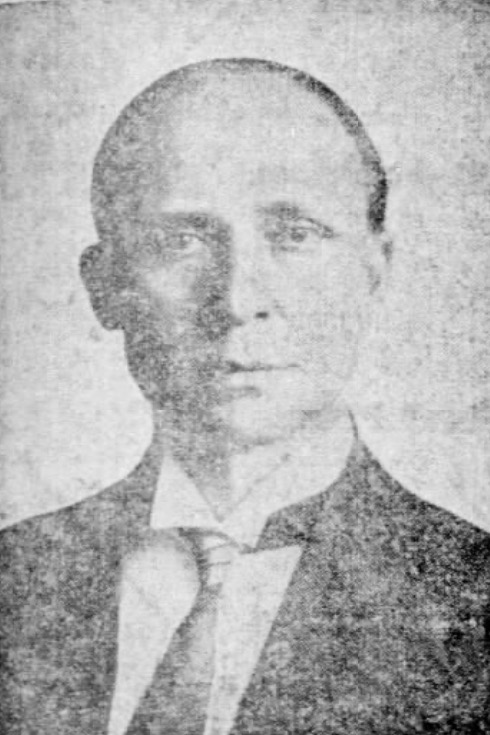
- Born: Osceola Speer; April 1, 1869; Alvarado, Texas, US
- Died: April 11, 1959 (aged 90); Austin, Texas, US
- Education: National Normal University
- Occupations: Jurist, writer
- Political party: Democratic
- Children: 4

Osceola "Ocie" Speer (April 1, 1869 – April 11, 1959) was an American jurist and writer. A Democrat, he served in various Texas courts and practiced privately. He was a prolific legal writer, primarily writing on the Constitution of Texas.

== Early life and education ==
Speer was born on April 1, 1869, near Alvarado, Texas, the son of educator D. Speer and Sallie (née Ellis) Speer. His family moved to Montague in the early 1870s, later moving to Wood County for eight years and to Fisher County. He was educated at public schools which his father taught at. He studied at National Normal University for a year.

== Career ==
Speer was admitted to the bar in 1890. A Democrat, he was then elected district attorney of Fisher County, serving from 1890 to 1892, refusing to run for re-election. He practiced privately in Bowie from 1894 to 1902, and from in 1899 while in a partnership with his brother, John. In 1902, he was appointed associate justice of the Court of Civil Appeals in Fort Worth, becoming the youngest ever appellate judge in Texas at the time. In 1912, he unsuccessfully ran for associate justice of the Supreme Court of Texas.

From 1914 to 1925, Speer again practiced privately, spending 1918 in partnership with Marvin H. Brown. In 1925, he moved to Austin and became a member of the Texas Court of Criminal Appeals, returning to private practice in 1929. He was the legal counselor of the Texas Department of Banking from 1933 to 1939, and again from 1949, until his retirement. From 1939 to 1949, he was assistant to the Texas Attorney General. Over his career, he argued in cases involving Governor Miriam A. Ferguson, the tidelands, and Yates Oil Field. He retired in 1953, and was said to have had the longest public service career in Texas history.

In his career, Speer wrote more than 2,700 legal opinions, said to be the most in Texas history by one person. As a legal writer, he was a leading figure in the study of the Constitution of Texas. He was a contributor for Texas Jurisprudence, a legal encyclopedia. He wrote the following legal texts:

- The Law of Married Women in Texas (1901)
- A Brief (1925)
- A Treatise on the Law of Special Issues in Texas (1931)
- Texas Jurists (1936)
- A Treatise on the Law of Banks and Banking in Texas (1952)

Speer also supported all former Texas judges having portrait paintings, which he compiled in another book.

== Personal life and death ==
On December 13, 1891, Speer married Annie F. Milner; they had five children together. He was a member of the Methodist Episcopal Church, South, and was also a Freemason. In 1901, he was a commander in the Sons of Confederate Veterans, and from 1914 to 1927, was president of the Texas Wesleyan University board of trustees. For leisure, he enjoyed beekeeping, chess, and breeding pigeons. He died on April 11, 1959, aged 90, in Austin, and was buried at the Austin Memorial Park Cemetery. His house, the Speer House – built in 1925 in the Spanish Colonial Revival style – is designated as an Austin landmark.
