= Open Windows (film) =

- Spanish theatrical release poster
- Directed by: Nacho Vigalondo
- Written by: Nacho Vigalondo
- Produced by: Belén Atienza; Enrique López Lavigne; Mercedes Gamero
- Starring: Elijah Wood; Sasha Grey; Neil Maskell
- Cinematography: Jon D. Domínguez
- Edited by: Bernat Vilaplana
- Music by: Jorge Magaz
- Production companies: Antena 3 Films; Apaches Entertainment; Spiderwood Studios; Wild Bunch; SpectreVision
- Distributed by: Aurum Producciones (Spain); Cinedigm (United States)
- Release dates: 10 March 2014 (SXSW); 4 July 2014 (Spain); 7 November 2014 (United States)
- Running time: 100 minutes
- Countries: Spain; United States
- Languages: English; Spanish; French

Open Windows is a 2014 found footage techno-thriller film directed and written by Nacho Vigalondo. The film stars Elijah Wood, Sasha Grey and Neil Maskell, and had its world premiere at South by Southwest on 10 March 2014. It is Vigalondo's first English-language film.

== Plot ==
In Austin, Texas, Nick Chambers wins a contest to meet his favorite actress, Jill Goddard. Nick, the webmaster of a fansite dedicated to Jill, is crushed when Chord, Jill's manager, informs him that she has not only failed to invite him to the film's publicity event but also canceled the contest. Chord remotely sends Nick a link to his laptop that opens a live stream. Chord explains that he has hacked into Jill's cell phone and activated the microphone and camera without her knowledge. Although uneasy about invading her privacy, Nick goes along with Chord's plans to spy on her. By eavesdropping on her phone conversations, they learn that she will secretly meet her agent, Tony, with whom she is having an affair, at the same hotel in which Nick is staying.

Chord directs Nick to use preexisting high-end surveillance equipment to spy on Jill and Tony. As he watches them, Nick is briefly contacted by a trio of hackers who address him as Nevada. Jill leaves Tony's room. When Nick's lights spontaneously turn on and Tony can see the camera pointed at his room, Nick panics as Tony leaves his room to investigate. Chord orders Nick to use a Taser to incapacitate Tony. Feeling that he has no choice, Nick agrees. Nick initially refuses to tie up Tony but does so once Chord threatens to stop helping him. Suspicious of why all this equipment is available in his hotel room, Nick questions who Chord really is; Chord ignores him and guides him out of the hotel, past the William P. Hobby, Jr. State Office Building by hacking into its security system.

Chord blackmails Nick into further compliance by revealing that the entire contest was a hoax, and Chord now has video proof of Nick's crimes. Chord forces Nick to follow Jill to her house, and he is contacted once again by the trio of hackers who believe Nick to be a famous hacker. They offer to help him in his latest hack and Nick recruits them to counteract Chord. Meanwhile, Chord hacks into Jill's PC when she goes home. When Nick refuses to send her PC a file, Chord demonstrates that he is capable of sneaking into Jill's house and killing her.

The file turns out to be a live feed of Tony's torture by electric current. Horrified, Nick attempts to bargain with Chord for Tony's release, but Chord only tortures Tony further. Chord forces Nick to give commands to Jill through her PC, and Nick demands that she reveal her breasts. Satisfied with the resulting video, Chord breaks the connection. Nick frantically attempts to warn Jill but she is kidnapped by Chord. With the help of the hackers, Nick pursues Chord. However, once they realize that Chord is actually the master hacker, Nevada, their loyalties are torn. Although they continue to help him, they warn Nick that Nevada is the best in the world and a veteran of numerous anarchist operations, though none of them have resulted in physical harm to anyone.

The hackers later discover that Chord has killed Nevada and taken his place. After both Nick and Chord throw off the police, Nick crashes his car and Chord shoots him. Chord hacks into the entire Internet and virtually every website is replaced with a teaser of Jill's revealing video. When the site goes live, Chord explains that instead of a sex tape, she will be killed live on the Internet unless her fans immediately close the browser window. The site's traffic increases dramatically and Chord fakes her death at an abandoned factory. Jill plays along with Chord and says that she understands the point about society that he is making. However, when his guard is down, she flees.

Nevada reveals to Chord that he is still alive and has been impersonating Nick the whole time. The real Nick was safely hidden in Nevada's car trunk, and the whole scenario was an operation designed to flush Chord out. Nevada and Jill escape to safety in a bunker before explosives blow up the factory, killing Chord in his own trap. Nevada and Jill discuss what to do next, and she asks to accompany him as he retreats back into the underground hacker movement.

== Cast ==
- Elijah Wood as Nick Chambers/Nevada
- Sasha Grey as Jill Goddard
- Neil Maskell as Chord
- Nacho Vigalondo as Richy Gabilondo
- Iván González as Tony Hillman
- Scott Weinberg as Don Delano
- Trevante Rhodes as Brian
- Brian Elder as Fantastic Fest Attendee
- Adam Quintero as Pierre
- Adam J. Reeb as Fantastic Fest Fan
- Daniel Pérez Prada as Triop
- Mike McCutchen as Moviegoer
- Jaime Olías
- Rachel Arieff
- Ulysses Lopez

== Production ==
Vigalondo was inspired to create Open Windows after he was asked to create a thriller film that heavily featured the Internet, akin to Mike Nichols's Closer. He found writing the script a challenge, as he had to create the film's plot as well as give specific reasons for each window that opened and why the point of view would shift between the characters. Vigalondo approached Wood specifically to star in the film and actress Sasha Grey was brought on board the project after she asked her manager to get her a copy of the script and set up a meeting with the director. The film appealed to Grey, as she was a fan of Vigalondo's work but was also intrigued by the character of Jill as a public figure and as someone who has to deal with "criticism and scrutiny and online haters and cyber stalkers". On 1 April 2014, Cinedigm acquired the US distribution rights to the film.

Filming took place in Madrid, Spain, during the last week of October 2012, and in Austin, Texas.

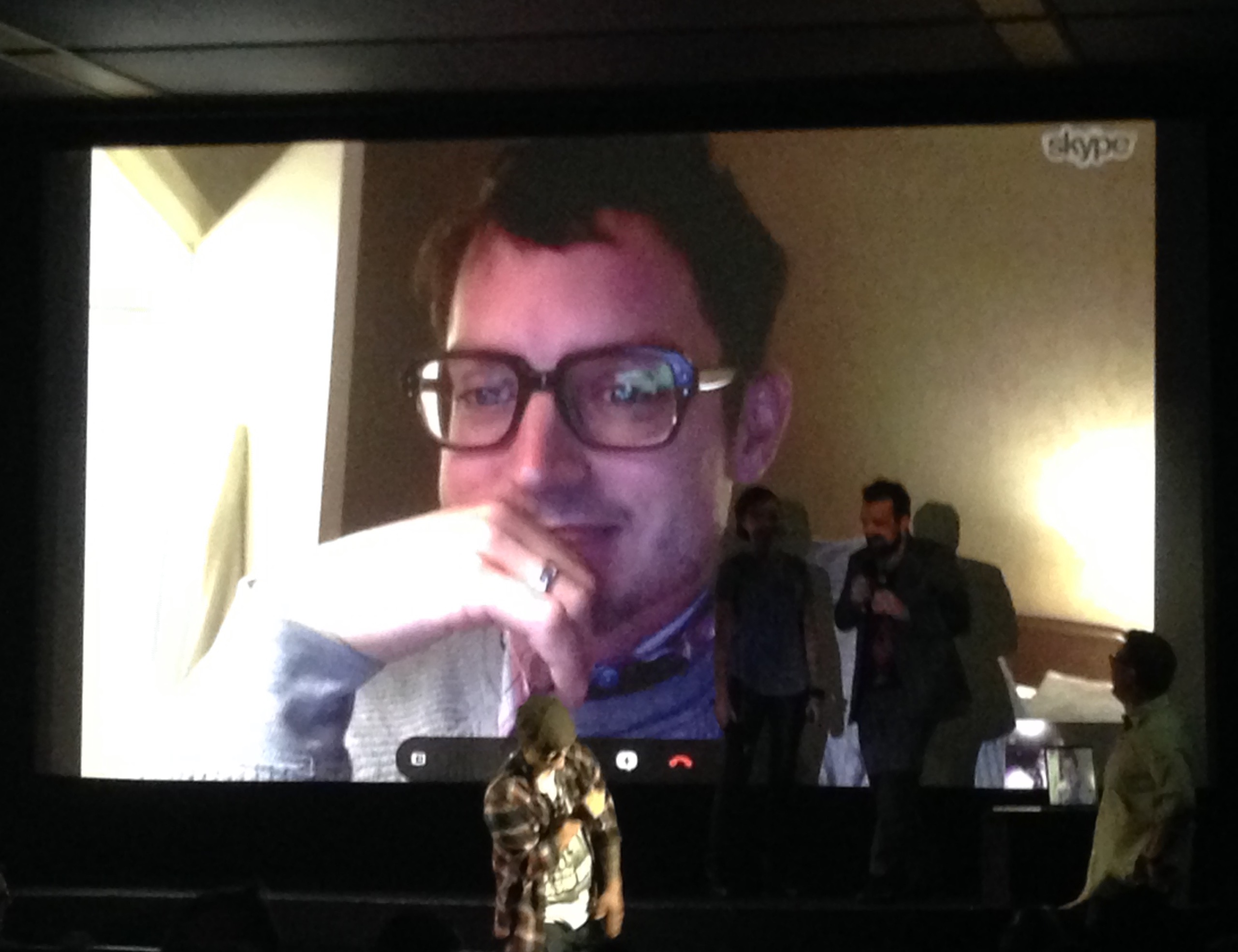
Wood being interviewed via Skype at the Los Angeles premiere at Cinefamily

== Release ==
The film had its world premiere at South by Southwest on 10 March 2014, and was screened in Los Angeles as part of SpectreFest on 4 October that year.

== Reception ==
Rotten Tomatoes, a review aggregator, reports a 46% score of 40 critics surveyed; the average rating is 5.35/10. The site's consensus states: "Open Windows is undeniably ambitious; unfortunately, director Nacho Vigalondo's reach far exceeds his grasp." The film has a score of 51 out of 100 based on 10 reviews at Metacritic.

We Got This Covered praised the acting of Wood and Grey while stating overall that "Open Windows spams audiences with an overload of development without much explanation, much like those information-less ads claiming to solve your impotency problem with a magic formula." Shock Till You Drop panned the film and gave it a rating of 4 out of 10, criticizing it as the "biggest disappointment of the fest." Justin Chang of Variety wrote, "A fiendishly inventive thriller built around an audacious if unsustainable gimmick, Open Windows elevates Hitchcockian suspense to jittery new levels of mayhem and paranoia." John DeFore of The Hollywood Reporter wrote that only genre diehards are likely to accept the level of suspension of disbelief necessary to enjoy the film. Jeannette Catsoulis of The New York Times described it as "cleverly designed but hellish to watch" due to its overdone plot twists.
