= Texas Music Office =

Business promotion office

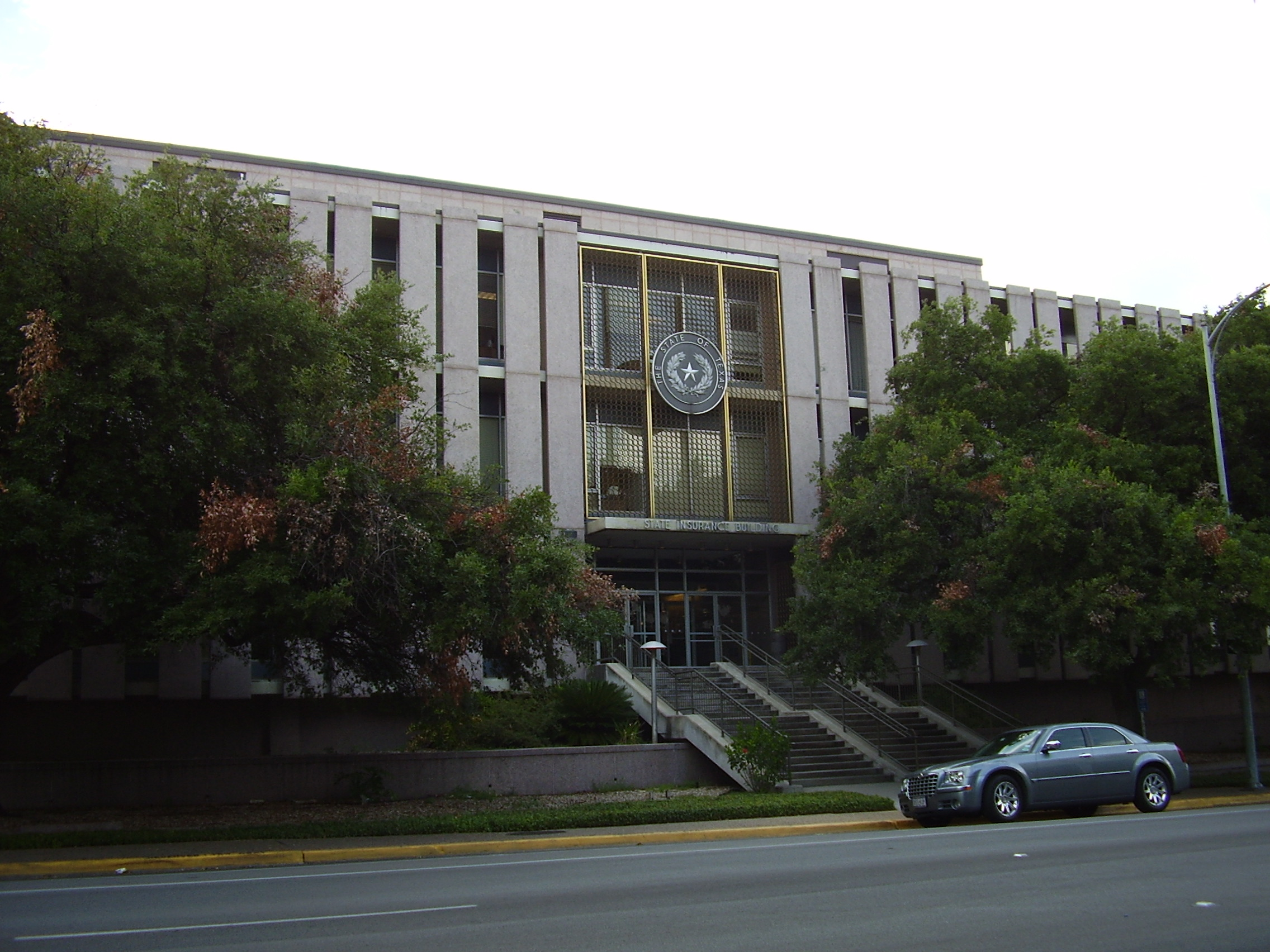
The Texas State Insurance Building used to host the offices of the Texas Music Office

The Texas Music Office (TMO) is a division of the Governor's Office of Economic Development supporting the Texas music industry. Its programs include the Texas Music Industry Directory, which lists musicians, music businesses, and radio stations across the state; Music Friendly Texas, which connects Texas communities to foster music industry development at the local level; the Texas Music Education and Community Program Grant, funded by the sale of the Texas Music license plate and providing grants to nonprofits that support music education; and the Texas Music Incubator Rebate Program, which reinvests tax revenue into music venues and festivals to support and strengthen the industry.

In 2024, an economic impact study found that the Texas music industry accounted for 195,979 jobs, $10.484 Billion in earnings and $31.655 Billion in revenue and sales while contributing $0.564 Billion to the state tax revenue. That same year, around 30,000 individuals were serviced by the TMO through events, workshops, speaking engagements, and certifications. The TMO is the sister office to the Texas Film Commission.

== History ==
By creating the Texas Music Commission (TMC) in 1985, the 70th session of the Texas Legislature identified music as an industry in need of state government recognition and assistance. The TMC was a nine-member advisory board appointed by the Governor Mark White that held hearings for and issued annual reports to the Legislature. Its primary advocate was House Speaker Gib Lewis, whose staff, notably Bekki Lammert, handled the support for the volunteer Commission's nine members. This was the first law passed by a state legislature in the United States creating an office promoting commercial music business.

The Austin Music Industry Council initiated and the Texas Legislature in 1987 appropriated $25,000 to the new Texas Department of Commerce (TDC) to further research the music industry and to determine the best way for a state entity to assist music business development. In 1988 TDC partially funded Texas' first Group Stand at MIDEM, at that time the world's largest music business convention, consisting of various Texas music businesses presenting their music at the Palais des Festivals in Cannes, France.

The TMC recommended the creation of a staffed office in the Executive branch promoting music business as a sister office to the Texas Film Commission (TFC). As part of the TDC budget, the Texas Legislature passed a new law that stated, "(a) The office shall promote the development of the music industry in the state by informing members of that industry and the public about the resources available in the state for music production."

In September 1989, the TFC appropriated $39,000 for music and posted a job notice for the first director of the TMO. TFC Director Joseph Dial and Deputy Director Tom Copeland selected Casey Monahan, a music journalist with the Austin American-Statesman since 1985. The TMO officially opened January 20, 1990 during the administration of Texas Governor William P. Clements. During its first year the TMO interviewed more than 1,000 music businesses and compiled Texas' first Business Referral Network for music.

In January 1991, Ann Richards was sworn in as Texas Governor. One of her first legislative requests was to move the TMO and the TFC from the Texas Department of Commerce to the Office of the Governor. Richards' longtime personal interest in Texas music and film greatly raised the public profile of both industries, and bringing these two programs into the Governor's Office institutionalized music and film as key parts of Texas' future economic growth plans. Other Richards music milestones include publishing the first Texas Music Industry Directory (1991), and her "Welcome to Texas" speech to the opening-day registrants of the 1993 South By Southwest conference.

== Development of the TMO ==
In March 1991, the TMO published the first of 16 annual editions of the Texas Music Industry Directory (TMID). The TMID, released concurrently with SXSW, went from 199 pages with 1,169 listings in 1991, to 432 pages with 15,278 listings in its final edition in 2006. The TMID referenced 96 different types of music business and was edited by Monahan along with Deb Freeman (1991–98), Jodi Jenkins (1999–2004), and Andrew Leeper (2005–06) who served as publications coordinator with the TMO. The 1993, 1994 and 1997 editions are currently housed in the Rock and Roll Hall of Fame Library and Archives.

In 1994, Monahan joined Austin area artist manager Carlyne Majer, Asleep at the Wheel band leader Ray Benson, SXSW director Roland Swenson, and City of Austin music liaison Bob Meyer to bring the National Academy of Recording Arts and Sciences to Texas in 1994: the first new NARAS chapter in 22 years. That same year, the TMO created its first annual calendar of annual live music events, and in 1995, the TMO collaborated with the Texas State Library & Archives Commission to create its first website.

In 1999, the TMO created the first statewide referral network for Mariachi Education and Mariachi Talent. Also in 1999, the TMO collaborated with the University of Texas School of Law Fellowship recipient Kate Hayman to produce Getting Started in the Texas Music Business. This online publication provides answers to basic legal and business questions associated with the music industry. The 2011 edition has been expanded to cover many Internet-related topics, including digital music copyright law.

The TMO brought together the Texas State Historical Association and Texas State University's new Center for Texas Music History to publish The Handbook of Texas Music, an encyclopedia of the state's rich musical history and heritage in 2001. That same year, the TMO began its annual Capitol Salute to Texas Music, a reception during South by Southwest bringing together state legislators with music industry leaders to discuss music opportunities and to hear Texas legends such as Johnny Gimble, W.C. Clark, Junior Brown, Randy Garibay, Reckless Kelly, Ryan Bingham, and Hayes Carll.

In 2002, the TMO created the Texas Music History Tour, an online guide to the large number of classic Texas music venues and historical music sites. The Texas Legislature passed a bill authored by former Sam Lightnin' Hopkins' bassist Rep. Ron Wilson (D-Houston) creating an "Enjoy Texas Music" special license plate, which Governor Rick Perry signed into law in 2003. $22 of the $30 extra fee goes into a TMO-administered fund that awards grants to schools to purchase musical instruments and lesson from Texas retailers and instructors.

In 2005, the TMO worked with Austin attorney Cindi Lazzari to expand to musicians the protections enjoyed by visual artists during bankruptcy proceedings. With the assistance of Texas Women for the Arts and the Texas Cultural Trust, the TMO created the Intermediate Masters Program in 2007 benefiting a Texas music student's graduate studies.

In 2015, longtime Texas Music Office Director, Casey Monahan was informed by Governor Elect Greg Abbott that he would not be kept in his position during the new administration, with Abbott choosing musician and entrepreneur Brendon Anthony as his successor.

== See also ==
- Office of the Governor of Texas
- Texas Film Commission
- List of Texas state agencies
