= 1972 Texas lieutenant gubernatorial election =

- November 7, 1972
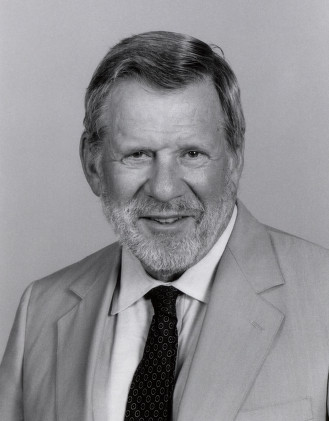

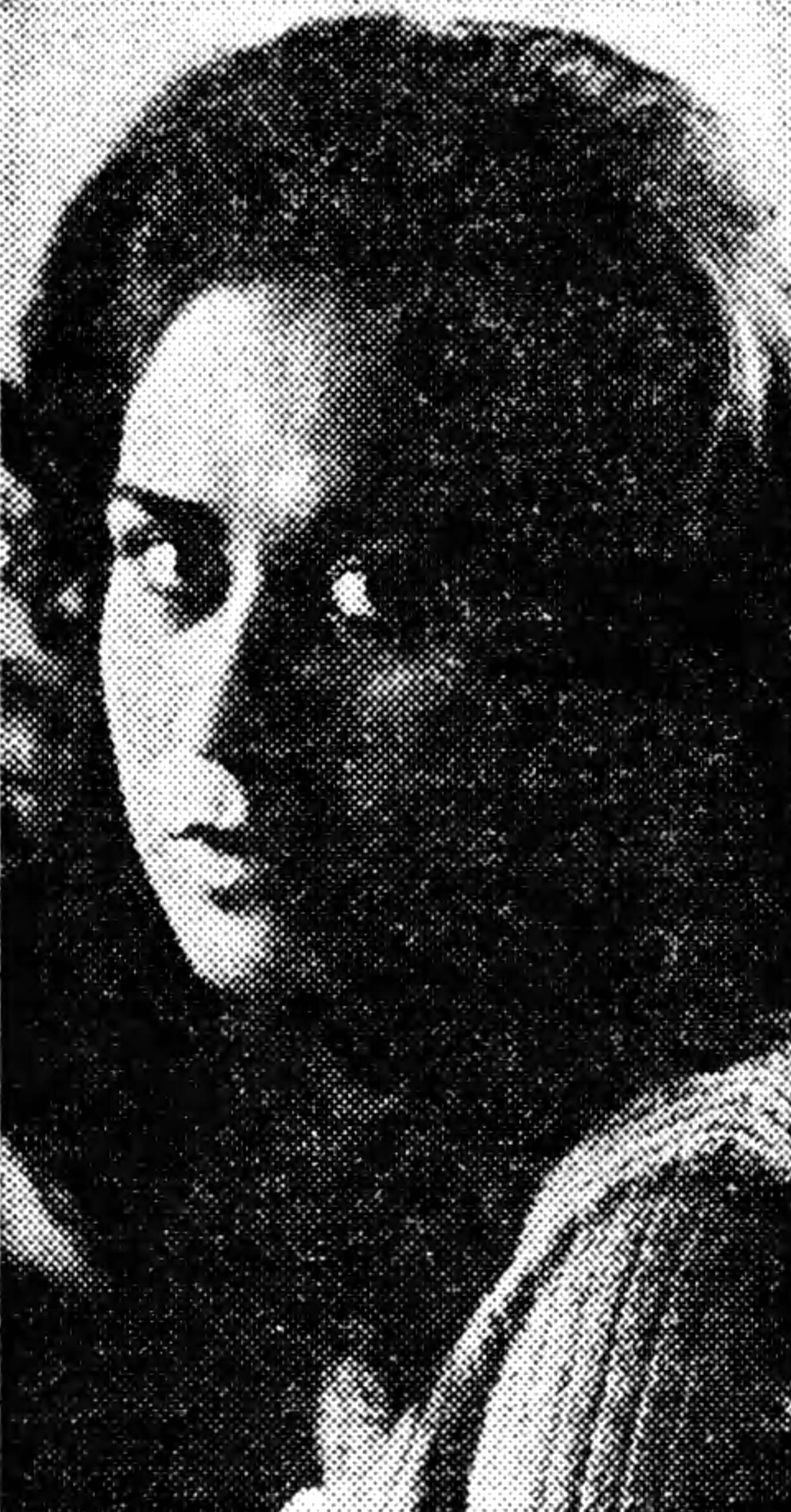
Nominee	William P. Hobby Jr.	Alma Canales
Party	Democratic	Raza Unida
Popular vote	2,339,796	130,626
Percentage	93.63%	5.23%
- County results Hobby: 60–70% 70–80% 80–90% >90% Canales: 50–60%
Lieutenant Governor before election
Ben Barnes
Democratic
Elected Lieutenant Governor
William P. Hobby Jr.
Democratic

The 1972 Texas lieutenant gubernatorial election was held on November 7, 1972, in order to elect the lieutenant governor of Texas. Democratic nominee William P. Hobby Jr. defeated Raza Unida nominee and activist Alma Canales and Socialist Workers nominee Meyer Alewitz. This was the last lieutenant gubernatorial election before the Constitution of Texas was amended in 1972, which extended the state's federal officers terms from two to four years.

== Democratic primary ==
The Democratic primary election was held on May 6, 1972. As no candidate won a majority of votes, there was a run-off on June 3, 1972, between the two highest-ranking candidates, William P. Hobby Jr. and Wayne Connally. Hobby won the primary with 55.84% against Connally, and was thus elected as the nominee for the general election.

=== Results ===
Candidate	First round		Run-off	
Candidate	Votes	%	Votes	%
William P. Hobby Jr.	689,729	33.20	1,101,355	55.84
Wayne Connally	598,316	28.80	870,929	44.16
Joe Christie	374,919	18.05		
Ralph Hall	304,522	14.66		
Bill Jones	55,201	2.66		
Robert E. McCord	25,160	1.21		
Troy Skates	11,317	0.54		
John A. Standlea	18,116	0.87		
Total	2,077,280	100.00	1,972,284	100.00

== General election ==
On election day, November 7, 1972, Democratic nominee William P. Hobby Jr. won the election by a margin of 2,209,170 votes against his foremost opponent Raza Unida nominee Alma Canales, thereby retaining Democratic control over the office of lieutenant governor. Hobby was sworn in as the 37th lieutenant governor of Texas on January 16, 1973.

=== Results ===
Texas lieutenant gubernatorial election, 1972
Party	Candidate	Votes	%
Democratic	William P. Hobby Jr.	2,339,796	93.63
Raza Unida	Alma Canales	130,626	5.23
Socialist Workers	Meyer Alewitz	27,222	1.09
	Scattering	1,332	0.05
Total votes		2,498,976	100.00
Democratic hold			
