= Texas Cyber Command =

Agency responsible for cyber defense

The Texas Cyber Command (TXCC) is an agency within the Government of Texas. It is based in San Antonio and has the purpose of cooperating with state, local, and federal partners to identify weaknesses in state and local government systems, and coordinate with governments on effective responses to cyber attacks. It was established by Governor Greg Abbott during the 89th Texas Legislature to centralize cybersecurity operations and transfer cyber defense functions from the Texas Department of Information Resources. After its establishment, retired United States Navy vice admiral Timothy J. White, who previously served as commander of the United States Fleet Cyber Command was named the first Chief of TXCC by Governor Abbott.

== List of chiefs ==
No.	Chief		Term			Service branch
No.	Portrait	Name	Took office	Left office	Term length	Service branch
1	Timothy J. White	Vice Admiral; Timothy J. White	16 September 2025	Incumbent	262 days	U.S. Navy

== See also ==
- List of cyber warfare forces
- United States Cyber Command
