= Idaho Office of Administrative Hearings =

Central panel agency in Idaho, USA

The Idaho Office of Administrative Hearings (OAH) is an independent, central panel agency that holds administrative hearings on behalf of certain agencies of the executive branch of the state government. Pursuant to statute, OAH's administrative law judges preside over administrative contested cases which arise from the appeal of an agency order, and may also provide mediation, arbitration, and other adjudication services to any Idaho agency, other than the Idaho Water Board and Idaho Department of Water Resources.

OAH publishes an annual report which outlines various data regarding OAH's annual operations, including case number statistics, rate of agency reversals, and percentage of parties who are represented by counsel at contested case proceedings.

In addition to its contested case activities, OAH is also responsible for the creation, and maintenance, of the Idaho Rules of Administrative Procedure.

OAH's main office is located in Boise, Idaho; hearings are conducted in-person throughout the state, and may also be conducted by video or telephone conference, depending on the parties' preference and the needs of the contested case.

== Organization and authority ==
The OAH is headed by a Chief Administrative Law Judge, who is appointed by the governor with the advice and consent of the state senate. The Chief Administrative Law Judge then appoints individual administrative law judges. The Chief Administrative Law Judge and the appointed administrative law judges all have the authority to hear cases. Administrative law judges have the authority to compel the appearance of witnesses at a hearing.

The OAH is governed by Chapter 52, Title 67 of the Idaho Code; in particular, Idaho Code §§ 67-5280 through 67-5286.

== History ==
OAH was created in 2022 by legislation passed that same year by the Idaho Legislature. Prior to that, each Idaho agency conducted its own hearings, an administrative process that was scrutinized by the Idaho Legislature for the potential appearance of a lack of impartiality.

Governor Brad Little appointed Bryan A. Nickels to serve as Idaho's first Chief Administrative Law Judge, effective September 6, 2022.

== See also ==
- United States administrative law
