= Juarez–Lincoln University =

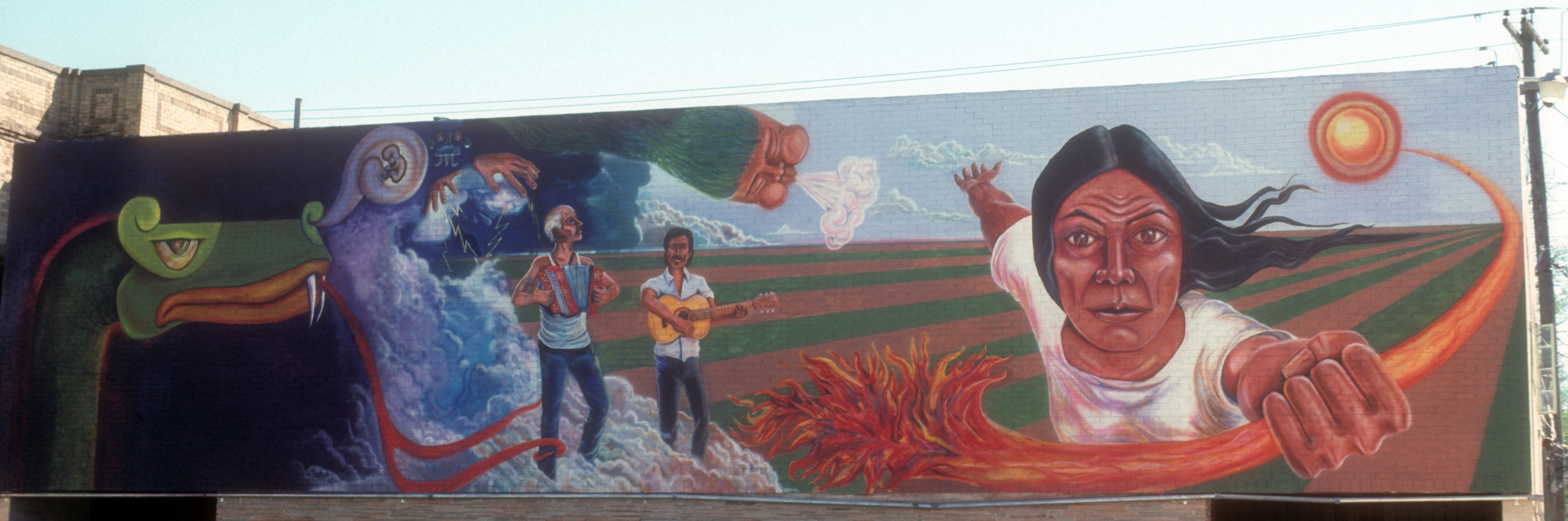
Los Elementals Mural designed by Raul Valdez.

Juarez–Lincoln University was an institution that was founded in 1971. The university was one of many institutions that was made in the late 1960s because of the Mexican American movement that demanded more Latino involvement such as representations and being included in higher institutions. Experiences of discrimination and the absence of Mexican American history in school curriculum occurred throughout the United States. The Mexican American Youth Organization (MAYO), a civil rights organization, had a conference in 1969 and made a plan to make Jacinto Treviño College in Mercedes, Texas. The concept was initially presented at a plenary session of the Mexican American Youth Organization holding its annual statewide meeting at La Lomita, a building which had been a seminary, just south of Mission, Texas in December 1969.

In 1971 Dr. Leonard Mestas and Andre Guerrero had been associated with Jacinto Treviño College. While this college was growing into something larger, the direction of where the school should go was divisive. Some faculty saw the college as another institution. Others such as Leanord and Andre saw the college as a way to let students be themselves. The students should be able to express their beliefs and put their culture on display where people can see who they are as people. The school should also be an outlet fort the Chicano movement and bring more attention it on a national scale. After a few years and disagreements, Leonard and Andre left and made the Juarez-Lincoln Center in Fort Worth, Texas. Other faculty members joined with them to do what they believe should have been done with the first institution. The Antioch Graduate School of Education helped them and became an affiliate with the university. In 1975, it changed its name to Juarez–Lincoln University. Four years later, Antioch pulled their support from the university and this led to the closure of it. The building was used by local groups such as the League of United Chicano Artists (LUCHA) until its demolition in 1983.

== Context ==
The call for Mexican American representation in higher institutions in the United States derived from a much larger Chicano movement known as “La Lucha” which ranged from Civil Rights to cultural pride. In particular, the way College institutions handled Chicano and Chicana students in college, was seen as neglectful. In most universities, the demographic of faculty members where majority white, even in areas where the Latino population is high. The limited number of Mexican American professors showed that there was much needed representation for Mexican Americans in universities.Many of those who enroll in universities will experience all forms of discrimination, and at times, are not allowed to express their culture and where they came from. These events happening for decades made an invisible barrier against Mexican Americans and hindered their educational progress in their lives.

From this, the formation of the Mexican American Youth Organization (MAYO) occurred in 1967 which focused on Chicano cultural nationalism and the need to be directly involved in politics. MAYO later created the Raza Unida Party during a meeting in 1969. In that same year, MAYO discussed the need for more Mexican American representation in universities and they founded Colegio Jacinto Trevino in Mercedes, Texas. The goal of this university was to “provide positive answers to racism, exploitation, and oppression.” Antioch College in Ohio used its University Through Walls graduate program to help fund an education degree in Colegio Jacinto Trevino. This is where the college will get most of its funding throughout its lifespan. In 1971, disagreements over the direction of the university will cause two of its founders to leave and establish another university known as the Juarez-Lincoln Center.

== Campus ==
In the first year of the school, the building was located in Fort Worth. Those of the original group who had left, completed their graduate work towards a Masters in Education at the new center. In 1972, It moved the next year to St. Edward's University in Austin, Texas. In 1975, when the university had 200 students enrolled, they were able to expand and move to another separate building at 715 East First Street. They changed the name to Juarez–Lincoln University. On the outside of the building, Raul Valdez, a muralist painted a mural titled "Los Elementals", that depicted the four elements, earth, wind, fire, and water in a Mexican fashion. He had previously painted 2 other murals inside on the stairs to show that he is a good artist and for the college to allow him to paint on the wall outside. It was visible to anyone driving south on I-35 and garnered a lot of attention. The mural showed that there was a Mexican community that was proud of the university and what it became at the time. Artists were able to create what they wanted with no limitations.

== Academics ==
The curriculum in the university wanted to emphasize the bilingual and bicultural environment the students lived in and to work with local communities. In many high schools with a high Latino population, they had a model named “La Familia” which is when the teacher has a close relationship with students. They treat their students as if they were family members of their own. The motto “University-without-walls” meant that students had no real classes, and instead had projects that will be presented to a board. With these projects, students will have a faculty that they will report to and will be given guidance based on their progress. These projects will be used in the community and many of the assignments involve the community. They also learn about Mexican Americans and their contributions to American history. At its peak, there were over 500 students enrolled in the university. The tuition was kept at a low cost because they wanted students who could not afford to go to college, be able to enroll a university that gave them the support and resources that they needed. Many of the students lived in poor communities that had very little resources to support them.

Juarez-Lincoln kept its affiliation with Antioch which had a long-standing affiliation with UREHE, the Union for Research and Experimentation in Higher Education. UREHE member institutions were at the forefront of curricular and educational model delivery changes in U.S. institutions of higher learning. Among those changes were the recognition that adult members of society could return to college and receive college level credit for equivalent work experiences. Other variants of the traditional delivery model included the incorporation of supervised independent study and research, and competency based college level learning. Juarez-Lincoln was also the creator and sponsor of a Migrant Education Clearinghouse. They also supported other projects such as a Chicana Leadership Development group and the League of United Chicano Artists (LUCHA) which held art expositions at the center.

== Legacy ==
In 1979, Antioch College pulled their funding from Juarez–Lincoln University leading to its closure. Groups such as the League of Chicano Artists (LUCHA) and Mujeres Artistas del Suroeste will continue to use the building for art events. They will be using it for the next couple of years. In 1980, the real estate owners decide to announce the demolishing of the university to build a new office building. The neighborhood was against and tried to take it to court to resolve the issue and turn it into a neighborhood center but was unsuccessful. In 1983, the building was demolished, and the location of the university has been turned into an office building. Years later, they demolished the office building and turned it into an IHOP. This was a blow to the Latino community because of how easy it was for something that they saw as a historical site be destroyed. This is one of the only institutions that many Mexican Americans believed that could help the youth and support them in achieving their academic goals. For something to be destroyed so easily, it showed that the government and the city did not care for them. Raul Valdez has claimed that an event like the demolition is a sign of gentrification in Austin and that the displacement of Mexican Americans is making them lose their cultural identity. This university has been forgotten by the community in Austin and many of its history has disappeared into small articles reminiscing about the impact that it once had in this city.
