= 1978 Texas lieutenant gubernatorial election =

- November 7, 1978
- Turnout: 38.9% (Note: Of registered voters.) ▲9.4%
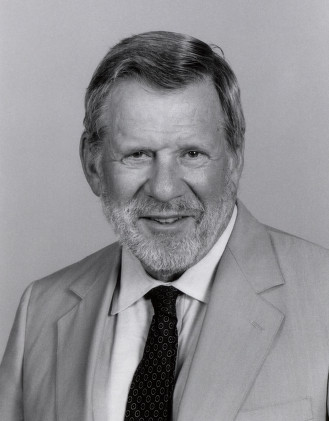

Nominee	William P. Hobby Jr.	Gaylord Marshall
Party	Democratic	Republican
Popular vote	1,434,613	760,642
Percentage	65.0%	34.4%
- County results Hobby: 50–60% 60–70% 70–80% 80–90% >90% Marshall: 50–60% 60–70%
Lieutenant Governor before election
William P. Hobby Jr.
Democratic
Elected Lieutenant Governor
William P. Hobby Jr.
Democratic

The 1978 Texas lieutenant gubernatorial election was held on November 7, 1978, to elect the lieutenant governor of Texas. The incumbent, William P. Hobby Jr. ran for re-election to his third term, he was elected against Republican, Gaylord Marshall, whom he had beaten four years earlier. Hobby won the election with 65% of the vote to Marshall's 34%, and was sworn in on January 16, 1979, alongside Texas' first Republican governor since Reconstruction, Bill Clements who had won the concurrent gubernatorial election.

== Primaries ==
Primaries were held on May 6, 1978, and runoffs were held on June 3, 1978, for both parties.

Democratic primary results
Party	Candidate	Votes	%
Democratic	William P. Hobby Jr.	1,071,359	69.6
Democratic	John Hill Westbrook	277,679	18.0
Democratic	James L. "Jim" McNees, Jr.	138,258	9.0
Democratic	Troy Skates	51,963	3.4
Total votes		1,539,259	100.0

Republican primary results
Party	Candidate	Votes	%
Republican	Gaylord Marshall	127,661	100.0
Total votes		127,661	100.0

== General election results ==
General election results
Party	Candidate	Votes	%
Democratic	William P. Hobby Jr.	1,434,613	64.91
Republican	Gaylord Marshall	760,642	34.42
Socialist Workers	Andrea Doorack	14,855	0.67
Total votes		2,210,110	100.0
Democratic hold			
