= 1974 Texas lieutenant gubernatorial election =

- November 5, 1974
- Turnout: 29.5% (Note: Of registered voters.) ▼35.0%
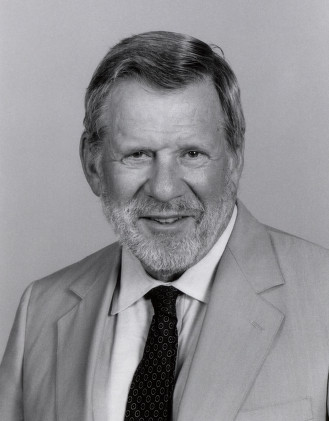

Nominee	William P. Hobby Jr.	Gaylord Marshall
Party	Democratic	Republican
Popular vote	1,121,567	444,870
Percentage	71.0%	28.2%
- County results Hobby: 50–60% 60–70% 70–80% 80–90% >90%
Lieutenant Governor before election
William P. Hobby Jr.
Democratic
Elected Lieutenant Governor
William P. Hobby Jr.
Democratic

The 1974 Texas lieutenant gubernatorial election was held on November 5, 1974, to elect the lieutenant governor of Texas. The incumbent, William P. Hobby Jr. ran for re-election to his second term, he was elected against Republican, Gaylord Marshall. Hobby won the election with 74% of the vote to Marshall's 24%. Hobby was sworn in for his second term on January 21, 1975.

As the Constitution of Texas had been amended in 1972 to extend the state's federal officers terms from two years to four, Hobby became the first lieutenant governor to be sworn into and serve a four-year term.

== Primaries ==
Primaries were held on May 4, 1974, and runoffs were held on June 1, 1974, for both parties.

Democratic primary results
Party	Candidate	Votes	%
Democratic	William P. Hobby Jr.	1,115,258	100.0
Total votes		1,115,258	100.0

Republican primary results
Party	Candidate	Votes	%
Republican	Gaylord Marshall	47,895	76.2
Republican	Troy Skates	14,950	23.8
Total votes		62,845	100.0

== General election results ==
General election results
Party	Candidate	Votes	%
Democratic	William P. Hobby Jr.	1,121,567	70.98
Republican	Gaylord Marshall	444,870	28.16
Socialist Workers	Daniel B. Fein	13,554	0.85
Write-in		57	0.00
Total votes		1,580,048	100.0
Democratic hold			
