= 1986 Texas lieutenant gubernatorial election =

- November 4, 1986
- Turnout: 45.6% (Note: Of registered voters.) ▼3.3%
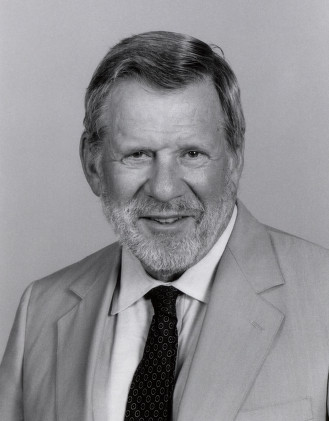

Nominee	William P. Hobby Jr.	David Davidson
Party	Democratic	Republican
Popular vote	2,032,781	1,231,858
Percentage	61.3%	37.1%
- County results Hobby: 50–60% 60–70% 70–80% 80–90% >90% Davidson: 50–60% 60–70%
Lieutenant Governor before election
William P. Hobby Jr.
Democratic
Elected Lieutenant Governor
William P. Hobby Jr.
Democratic

The 1986 Texas lieutenant gubernatorial election was held on November 4, 1986, to elect the Lieutenant Governor of Texas. The Incumbent, William P. Hobby Jr. ran for re-election to his fifth and final term, he was elected against Republican and former minister, David Davidson. During the campaign Davidson attacked Hobby's support of the tax increases passed by the Legislature in 1984, Hobby countered that the taxes supported services that helped citizens of the state. Despite 1986 seeing former Republican Governor Bill Clements defeat Mark White by 6 points in the concurrent governor race, Hobby won the election in a landslide over Davidson. By the end of his term Hobby became the longest serving Lieutenant Governor in Texas history.

== Primaries ==
Primaries were held on May 3, 1986, and runoffs were held on June 7, 1986, for both parties.

Democratic primary results
Party	Candidate	Votes	%
Democratic	William P. Hobby Jr.	761,999	74.2
Democratic	David Young	265,319	25.8
Total votes		1,027,318	100.0

Republican primary results
Party	Candidate	Votes	%
Republican	David Davidson	130,201	32.6
Republican	Aaron L. Bullock	111,036	27.8
Republican	Glenn Jackson	81,752	20.5
Republican	Virgil E. Mulanax	76,688	19.2
Total votes		399,677	100.0

Republican primary runoff results
Party	Candidate	Votes	%
Republican	David Davidson	89,259	69.6
Republican	Aaron L. Bullock	38,927	30.4
Total votes		128,186	100.0

== General election results ==
General election results
Party	Candidate	Votes	%
Democratic	William P. Hobby Jr.	2,032,781	61.37
Republican	David Davidson	1,231,858	37.19
Libertarian	William Howell	47,819	1.44
Total votes		3,312,458	100.00
Democratic hold			
