= Jacinto Treviño College =

Colegio Jacinto Treviño or Jacinto Treviño College was a college in Mercedes, Texas, United States from 1969 until the mid-1970s.

It was started by Mexican Americans who felt underserved by the current educational community in 1969. Colegio Jacinto Treviño Original Colegio Jacinto Treviño (CJT) Group – documented by Oscar Cerda Leonard Joseph Mestas, Ed.D. (CO) Center Director Oscar Cerda - Staff assistant

M. Ed. Students: Adolfo 'Duffy' Ramirez (TX) Alma Canales André Guerrero (TX) Aurelio 'Hershey' Montemayor (TX) Carmen Lomas Garza (Kingsville) Francisco 'Franco' Alejandro (TX) Guadalupe 'Lupe' Saavedra (CA) Juan Cotera (TX) Marta Cotera (TX) Narciso Aleman (CO) Nita Gonzalez Aleman – Denver, CO Ruben Solis Samuel 'Sammy' Nieto (TX)

Later CJT Group: Francisco Briones (TX) Sylvia Llanez (Yanez?) (CA) Lali Saenz (TX)

Rene Treviño (Marjie - mate) – Kingsville (present only for a few weeks) Responsible for selecting Jacinto Trevino name, supposedly a distant relative of his on which the Corrido de Jacinto Treviño was based.

It lost many of its staff and students due to political disputes in 1971 that lead to the founding of Juarez-Lincoln University led by Drs. Leanard Mestas and Andre Guerrero. Dr. Mestas eventually became a Catholic Priest ministering at a hospital in California. Andre Guerrero eventually obtained a Ph.D. from Harvard and was a key administrator for the Arkansas Department of Education in Little Rock. Oscar Cerda was part of the Juarez Lincoln staff and eventually moved to Washington State where he has held several administrative positions in state agencies. Aurelio Montemayor (known as El Monte by his students in San Felipe High School in the 60s and Hershey since childhood) went on to co-develop and lead the Curso de la Raza through 1974 and eventually joined the Intercultural Development Research Association in San Antonio Texas from September, 1975, through the present (December 2018). Narciso Aleman became a practicing attorney. Nita Gonzalez Aleman, daughter of 'Corky' Gonzalez of "Yo Soy Joaquin" fame, returned to Denver and ran an independent school for many years. Adolfo Ramirez returned to teaching and eventually retired. Ruben Solis eventually moved to San Antonio and co-founded the Southwest Workers Union Franco Alejandro got hist Ph.D. and worked for the Navy. Alma Canales ran on the statewide slate of the Raza Unida Party and eventually returned to her hometown, Waco, and continued as an activist. Carmen Lomas Garza completed an MFA and moved to San Francisco where she has been a renowned and successful artist. Juan Cotera and Martha Cotera, after giving service in Crystal City, Texas, returned to Austin where he was a successful architect and Martha continued her work as information scientist and activist.
