= Texas Board of Architectural Examiners =

The Texas Board of Architectural Examiners (TBAE) is an agency regulating the practice of architecture, landscape architecture, and interior design within the state of Texas. This includes regulating who may practice these professions in Texas. Overseeing registration and credential maintenance are two of their major tasks.

It is TBAE's "mission to ensure a safe built environment for Texas by regulating the professions of architecture, landscape architecture, and interior design."

The commission has main offices in the William P. Hobby State Office Building in Downtown Austin.
