= West Virginia Insurance Commission =

State agency of West Virginia

The West Virginia Insurance Commission, is the state agency that regulates the insurance industry and charged with overseeing the practices of insurance companies and protect the interests of policyholders and public.

== Divisions ==
The commission has four primary divisions; Consumer Advocate Division, Consumer Services Division, Financial Conditions Division, and Fraud Unit.

== Insurance Commissioner ==
As the head of the agency, the insurance commissioner oversees the state's insurance business and carry out the responsibilities of the agency. The current commissioner is James A. Dodrill who was appointed by Governor Jim Justice and went effective on March 4, 2019.

=== List of past commissioners ===
Name	Term	Notes
D. S. Butler	July 1, 1947 - April 30, 1948	
Robert A. Crichton	May 1, 1949 - June 30, 1952	
Hugh N. Mills	July 1, 1952 - June 30, 1953	
Thomas J. Gillooly	July 1, 1953 - September 30, 1956	
Louis Miller Jr.	October 1, 1956 - June 30, 1957	
Harold E. Neely	July 1, 1957 - February 5, 1958	
C. Judson Pearson	February 7, 1958 - January 15, 1961	
Hugh N. Mills	January 16, 1961 - May 16, 1961	
Virginia Mae Brown	May 17, 1961 - September 3, 1962	
Harlan Justice	September 4, 1962 - January 15, 1966	
Frank Montgomery	January 16, 1966 - September 30, 1968	
Robert J. Shipman	October 1, 1968 - January 30, 1969	
Samuel H. Weese	January 31, 1969 - January, 1975	
Donald W. Brown	January 16, 1975 - January, 1977	
Richard G. Shaw	January 17, 1977 - January 11, 1985	
Fred L. Wright	February 21, 1985 - June, 1988	
Hanley C. Clark	July 1, 1988 - January, 2001	
Michael D. Riley	July 1, 2011 - January 31, 2017	
Andrew R. Pauley	February 1, 2017 - March 2017	Acting commissioner
Allan L. McVey	April 1, 2017 - January 2019	
Erin Hunter	January 25, 2019 - March 2019	Acting commissionerr
James A. Dodrill	March 4, 2019 - Present	
