= Texas Office of Consumer Credit Commissioner =

Texas state agency

The Texas Office of Consumer Credit Commissioner (“OCCC”) is a Texas state agency that regulates non-depository lenders in the state of Texas, which includes, among others, mortgage loan originators, vehicle sales finance companies, debt settlement providers, pawnshops and credit access businesses.

The stated mission of the OCCC is to “regulate nonbank financial services and to educate consumers and industry providers, fostering a fair, lawful, and healthy financial services market that grow economic prosperity for all Texans”.

== Organization and history ==
Originally set up as the Office of Regulatory Loan Commissioner in 1963, the Office of Consumer Credit Commissioner (OCCC)’s current name was established when the Texas Credit Code was enacted in 1967. The Texas Finance Commission oversees the OCCC, and appoints the Consumer Credit Commissioner who serves at its will. Since her appointment in 1995, Leslie Pettijohn has been serving as the Consumer Credit Commissioner.

Since its formation in 1963, the industry categories regulated and overseen by the OCCC have steadily increased, as exemplified by the addition of oversight of pawn brokers in 1971, home equity lenders in 1997, and property tax lenders in 2008. As of May 2020, the OCCC regulates seven categories of licensed industries and five categories of registered industries. The OCCC’s primary location is Austin, TX, and the Office employed 86 FTE equivalents as of 2017 throughout the state.
