= Texas Film Commission =

State agency of Texas, United States

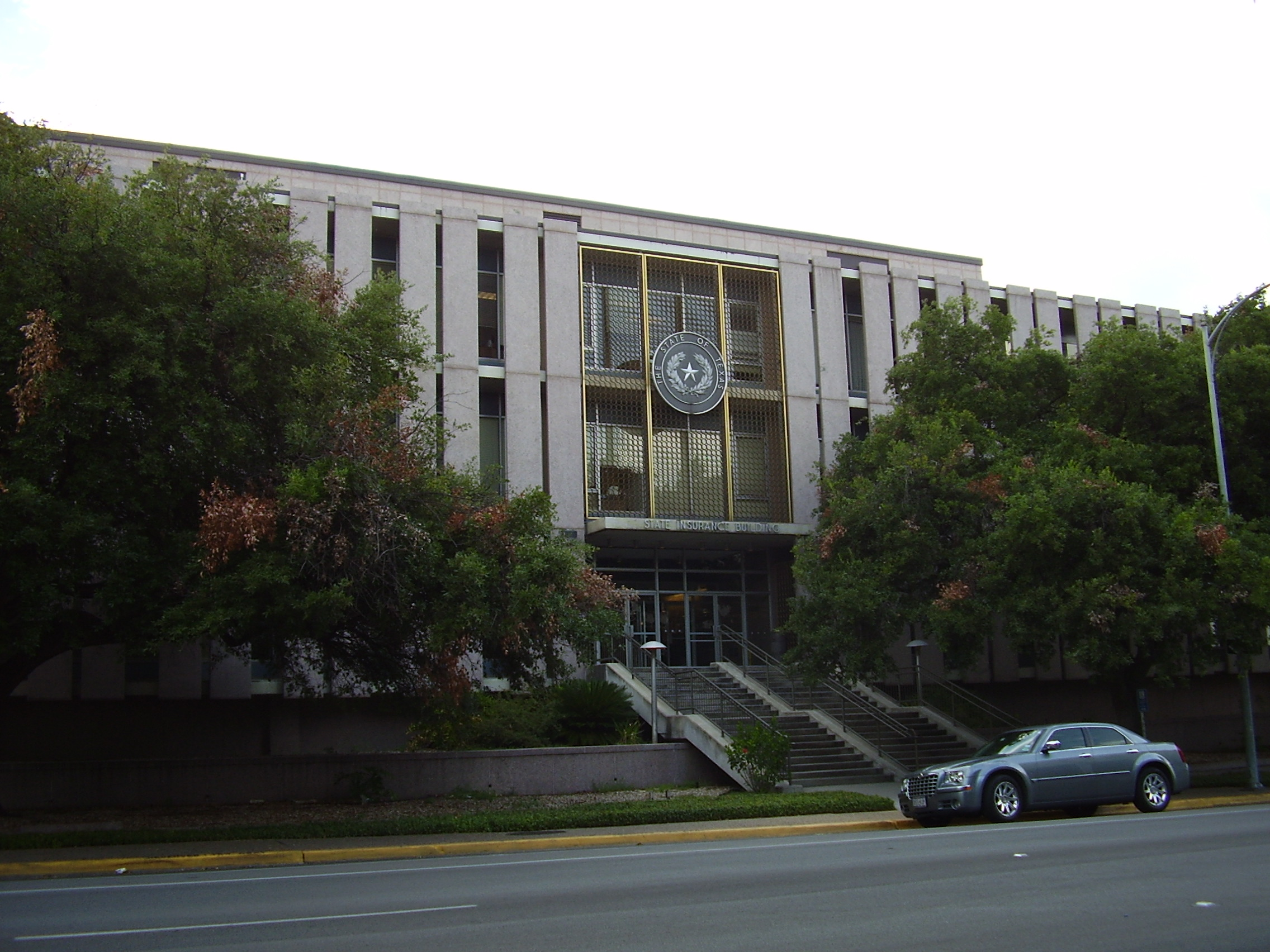
State Insurance Building, the headquarters of the commission

The Texas Film Commission is a state agency of Texas, under the oversight of the Governor of Texas. Its headquarters are in Suite 3.410 in the Texas Insurance Building in Downtown Austin.
