= Texas Facilities Commission =

Texas state agency that manages most state government buildings

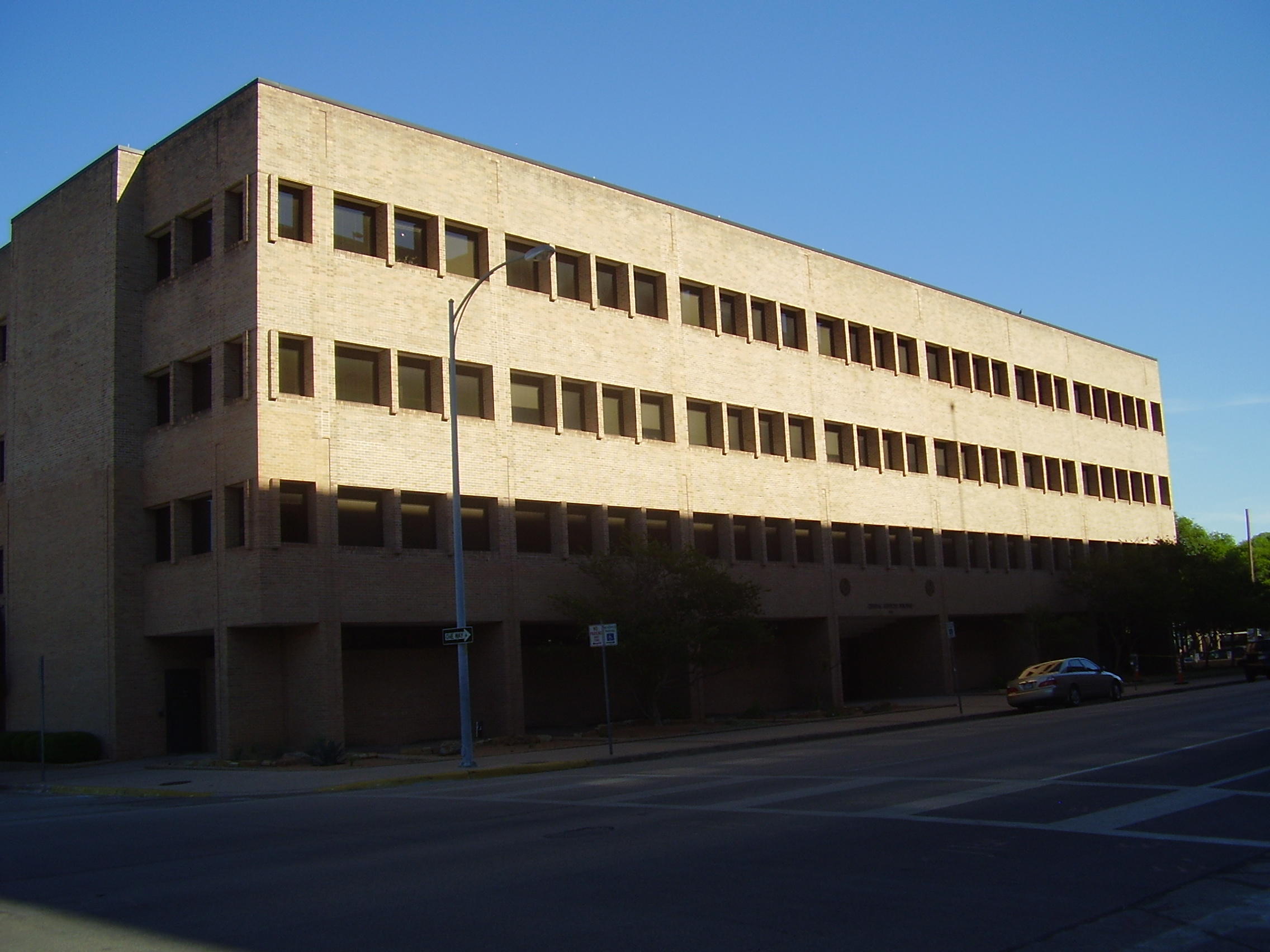
Central Services Building, agency headquarters

The Texas Facilities Commission is a Texas state agency.

TFC's main duty is to manage state government buildings (excluding those operated by universities, the Texas State Capitol, and the Governor's Mansion). TFC also handles the sale of surplus property and manages the Federal Surplus Program on behalf of the State and qualified local and non-profit agencies.

The TFC was originally established in 1919 as the State Board of Control, which mandated consolidation of the State's purchasing, printing, and property management functions. The State Purchasing and General Services Commission replaced the State Board of Control in September 1979. The agency's name was changed again in 1991 to the General Services Commission. In 2001, the 77th Legislature replaced the General Services Commission (GSC) with the Building and Procurement Commission (TBPC), while transferring responsibilities for telecommunications services to the Department of Information Services.

The final name change happened during the 80th Legislature when the TBPC was renamed the Facilities Commission and took over all responsibilities of the Building and Procurement Commission. At the time of the name change, additional responsibilities were assigned to the Facilities Commission, including control, maintenance, and repair of state properties; construction of a state building; purchase or lease of state properties; salvage and surplus property; and child care services for state employees.

TFC has its headquarters in the Central Services Building in Austin.
