= Texas Department of Banking =

US state agency

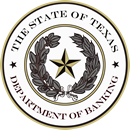
- Official logo of the Department of Banking

Agency overview
- Formed: 1943
- Headquarters: 2601 North Lamar Blvd., Austin, Texas
- Employees: 194
- Agency executive: Charles G. Cooper, Commissioner
- Website: www.dob.texas.gov

The Texas Department of Banking (DOB) is a state agency of Texas responsible for the chartering, regulation, and supervision of state-chartered banks, trust companies, and various non-bank financial institutions. Headquartered in Austin, the department ensures the safety of the Texas financial system and protects the interests of depositors and the public.

The banking commissioner serves as the chief executive and administrative officer of the department. Since December 2008, Charles G. Cooper has served as the commissioner of the Texas Department of Banking.

== History ==
The Texas Constitution of 1845 initially prohibited the incorporation of banks, leading to a period where financial services were provided by commission merchants and private lenders. State-chartered banks were officially authorized by the Texas State Bank Law in 1905. Oversight was initially placed under the Commissioner of Agriculture, Insurance, Statistics, and History. The modern department was established by the Texas Legislature in 1943. It was placed under the oversight of the Finance Commission of Texas, which also oversees the Department of Savings and Mortgage Lending and the Office of Consumer Credit Commissioner.

Since 2011, the Texas Department of Banking has permitted citizens to bring consumer protection lawsuits against national banks and federal thrifts. In 2013, the Department of Banking barred three bankers from managing or working at state-chartered banks for unspecified reasons.

In recent years, the department has been involved in several high-profile bank acquisitions.

== See also ==
- Texas Department of Information Resources
- Banking regulation and supervision
- Federal Deposit Insurance Corporation
