= Alma Canales =

American organizer and activist

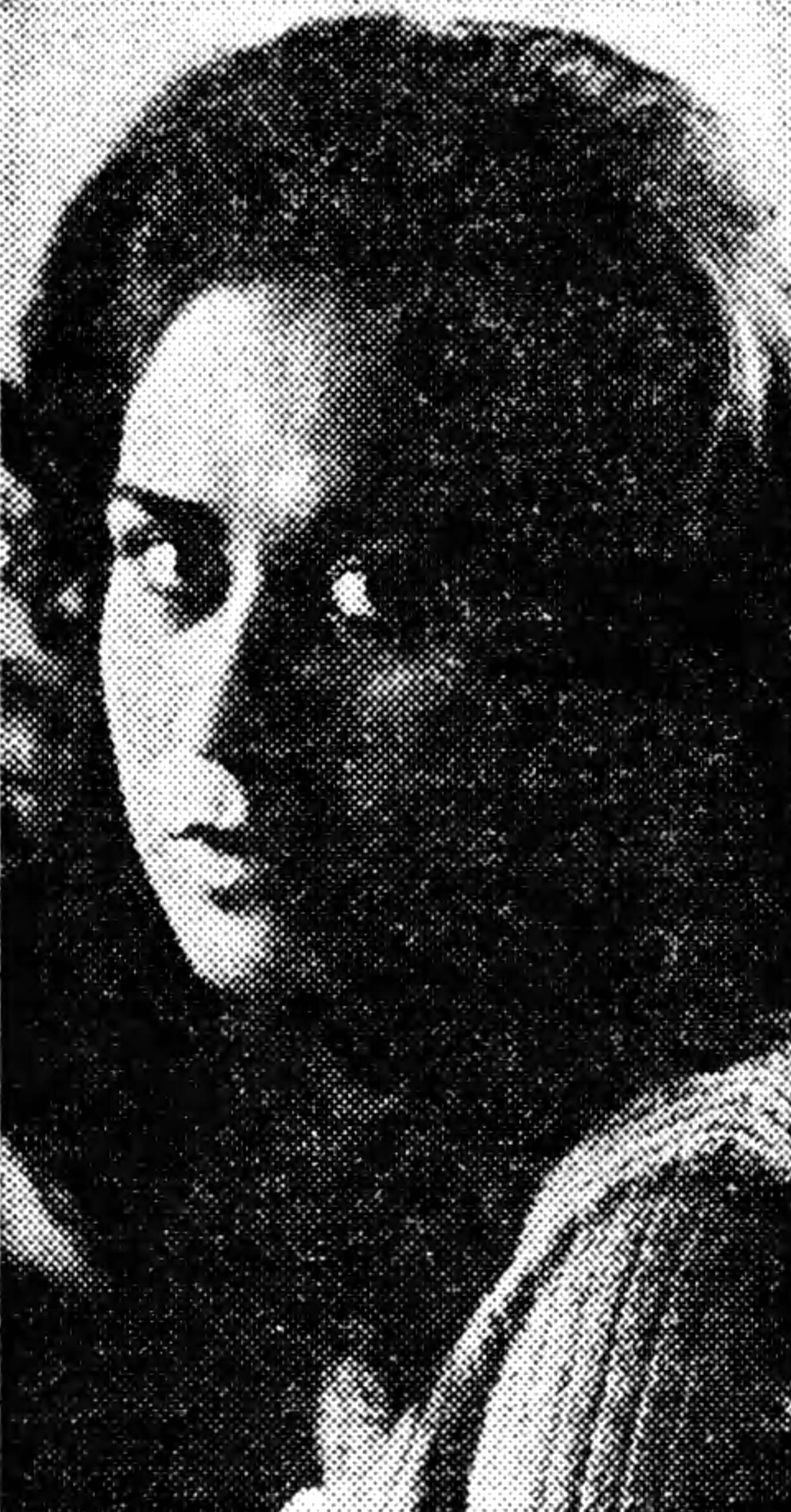
Canales c. 1972

Alma Canales (born 1947) is an American organizer and activist best known for being the first and only Chicana, and the only Mexican-American, to run for lieutenant governor of Texas before Linda Chavez-Thompson in 2010 and Leticia Van de Putte in 2014. In the 1970s, she actively participated in the Chicano movement as a member of the Mexican American Youth Organization (MAYO) and as an organizer in the Raza Unida Party (RUP).

== Early life and education ==
Canales was born in Rosita, Texas, to migrant parents and raised in Edinburg, Texas. Her family claimed ties to the land long before the United States annexed Texas in 1845. All family members worked as migrant farm workers during the summers, and their work took them seasonally from West Texas to Michigan. From a young age, Canales witnessed discriminatory practices in West Texas toward migrant workers.

The itinerant life of her farm working family made it difficult to establish a track record in school. However, Canales persevered to graduate from Edinburg High School in 1965 and received a journalism scholarship from the Edinburg Daily Review to attend University of Texas Pan American.

== Career and activism ==
The journalism scholarship enabled Canales to work as a reporter with the Edinburg Daily Review. She also wrote for her college paper. In the role of reporter, Canales looked further into events concerning Mexican American migrant workers and discrimination. At the height of the Vietnam War, Canales reported on casualties among young Chicano men. She noted the irony of young Mexican American boys being sent to war to fight for freedom and American democracy while still experiencing discrimination in South Texas. Her reporting on the war led to her increased participation in the MAYO.

Canales wrote for the Castro County News for a short time before moving in 1969 to Wisconsin as part of the Colorado Migrant Council to establish childcare centers. She returned to Edinburg, Texas later that summer to continue projects for the Colorado Migrant Council.

She later enrolled in Colegio Jacinto Trevino in Mercedes, Texas during which time she traveled to Mexico City as a representative of the United States Department of Education. The university disbanded before Canales could finish her degree.

Drawing from her experiences in MAYO and at Colegio Jacinto Trevino, Canales directed her energy into the early formation of Partido Raza Unida. In 1972, Canales accepted the RUP nomination for Lieutenant Governor of Texas. She was the first Chicana to run for this statewide position. She garnered 88,000 votes running on a platform that challenged discrimination and poverty. Shortly following the election, Canales left the RUP over differences with the direction of the party and moved to Waco, Texas.

Canales continued her activism by participating in the League of Women Voters, Waco Peacemaker Alliance, and as deputy director of the League of United Latin American Citizens Waco Council 273.

== Legacy ==
Alma Canales made history for women and for Chicanas specifically. Although she lost the lieutenant governor's race, "many down-ballot Raza Unida Party candidates won, and they were often Chicanas."
