= Employees Retirement System of Texas =

Coordinates: 30°16′47″N 97°44′12″W

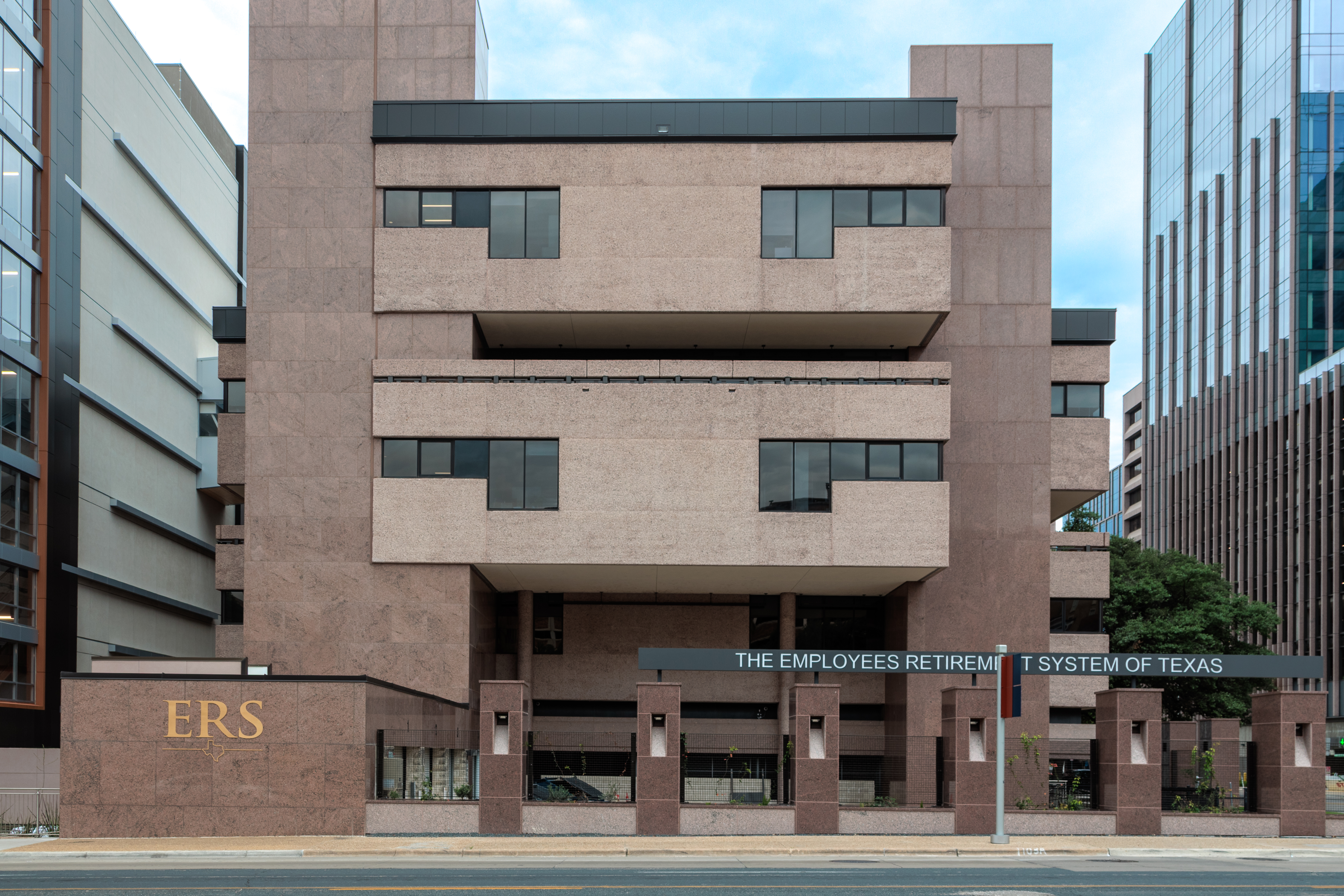
- ERS building facing E Martin Luther King Jr Blvd
- Interactive map of the Employees Retirement System of Texas area

General information
- Location: 200 E 18th St, Austin, TX 78701
- Year built: 1947

Employees Retirement System of Texas (ERS) is an agency of the Texas state government.

ERS was created in 1947 through amendment to the State Constitution. It oversees retirement benefits of state employees. It is headquartered at 200 E 18th Street in Austin, Texas. It is currently managed by CIO Tom Tull.

== Funding ==
As of 2020, the total unfunded liabilities of ERS is $14.7 billion.
