= Texas Medical Board =

State agency mandated to regulate the practice of medicine in Texas, USA

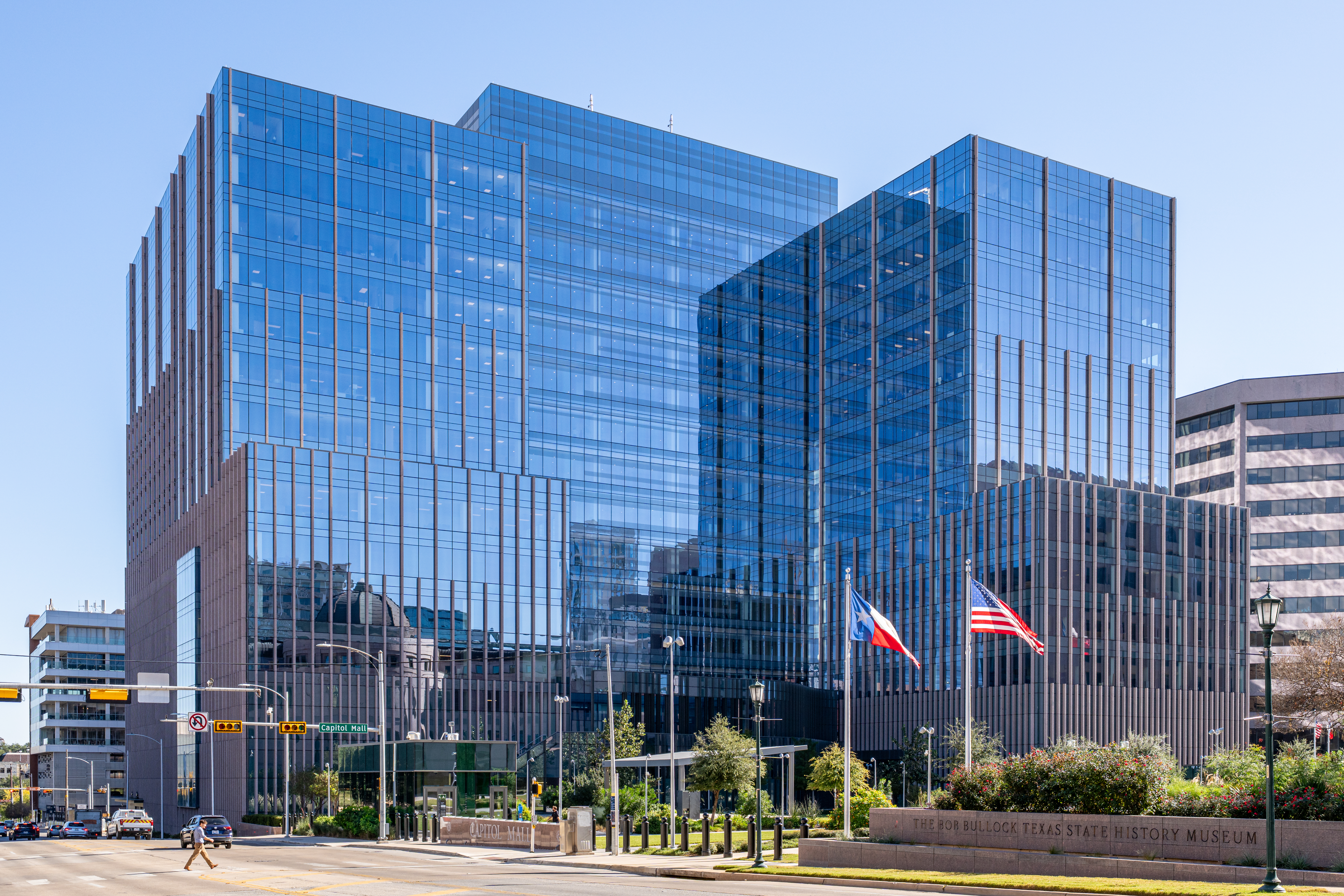
The Texas Medical Board is headquartered in the George H.W. Bush State Office Building

The Texas Medical Board (TMB) is the state agency mandated to regulate the practice of medicine by Doctors of Medicine (MDs) and Doctors of Osteopathic Medicine (DOs) in Texas. The board is composed of twelve physician members and seven public members, each appointed to a six-year term by the Governor and confirmed by the Senate. The full board is required to meet at least four times a year but customarily convenes five times a year. Typical Board business includes interviewing licensure candidates, considering disciplinary matters and adopting substantive and procedural rules, it delegates much of its work to committees, whose recommendations are then submitted for the full board's approval. Additionally, board committees address a variety of important issues. The board's mission is to make sure to enhance and protect the publics health and welfare by maintaining standards used in regulating the practice of medicine and ensuring the health care for the citizens.

The board also regulates as the Texas Physician Assistant Board, (Note: A regulatory board that is specifically responsible for licensing, regulating, and disciplining physician assistance) and as the Texas State Board of Acupuncture Examiners, (Note: Provides administrative and investigative support, but the board itself makes key decisions about licensing, regulation and discipline of acupuncturists,) and governs radiologic technologists and NPOs, among other health care practices. TMB is a member of the Federation of State Medical Boards.

The current president of the Texas Medical Board is Sherif Zaafran, M.D. The board is headquartered in the George H.W. Bush Building in Austin, Texas.

== Notable cases ==
In 2026, the Texas Medical Board removed three doctors for delayed care which resulted in the deaths of two pregnant women.
