= Texas Department of Information Resources =

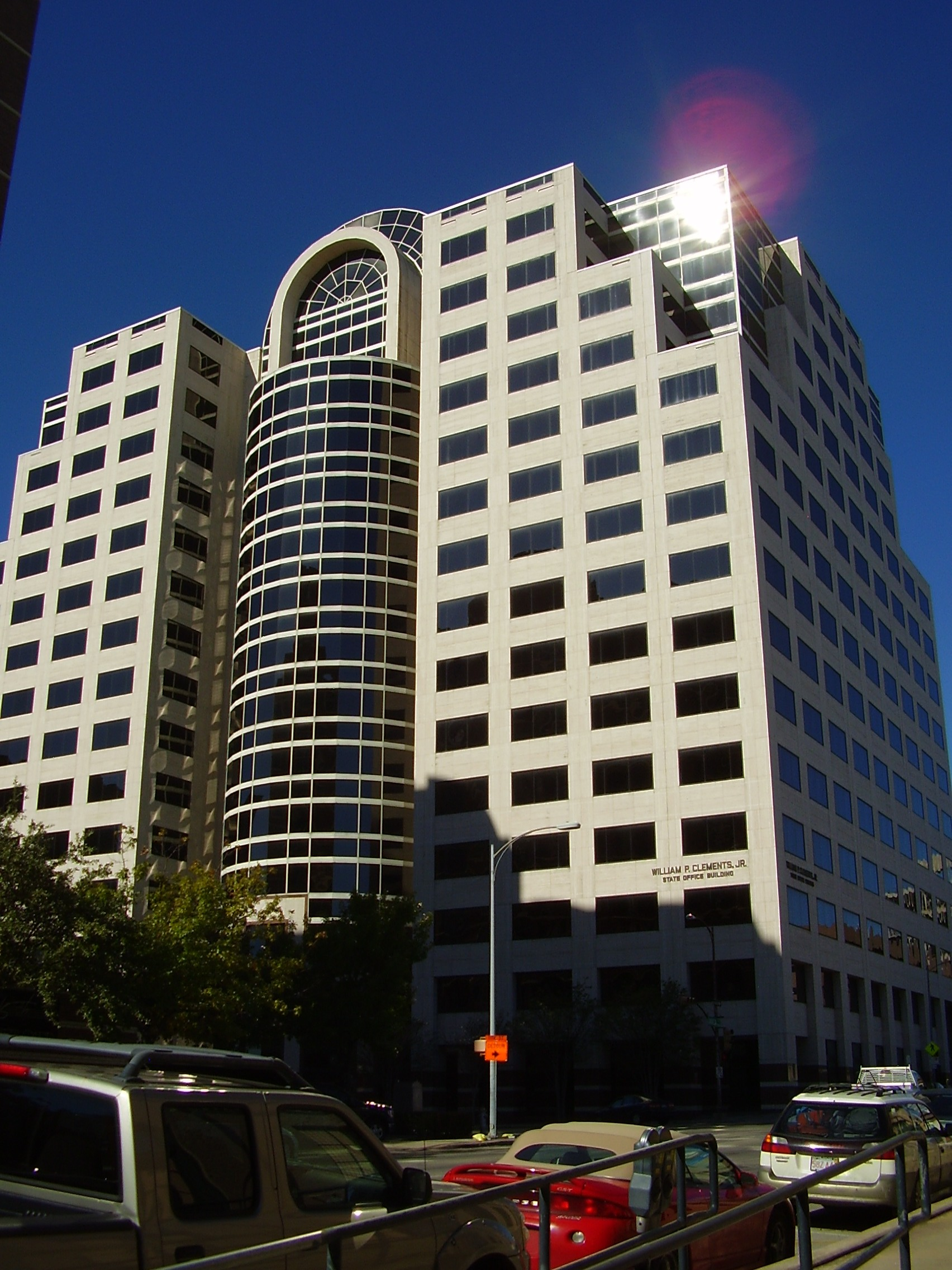
- William P. Clements State Office Building, which houses the DIR headquarters

Agency overview
- Jurisdiction: Government of Texas
- Headquarters: Suite 1300, William P. Clements Building, Austin, Texas

The Texas Department of Information Resources (DIR) is a state agency of Texas. It has its headquarters in Downtown Austin.

== Organization ==
- Chief Data Office (CDO)
- Chief Experience Office (CXO)
- Chief Financial Office (CFO)
- Chief Operations Office (COO)
- Chief Procurement Office (CPO)
- Chief Technology Office (CTO)
- Chief Public Affairs Office (CPAO)
- Deputy Executive Director Office (DED)
