= Governor of Texas =

Chief Executive of the U.S. state of Texas

- Seal of the governor

- Standard of the governor

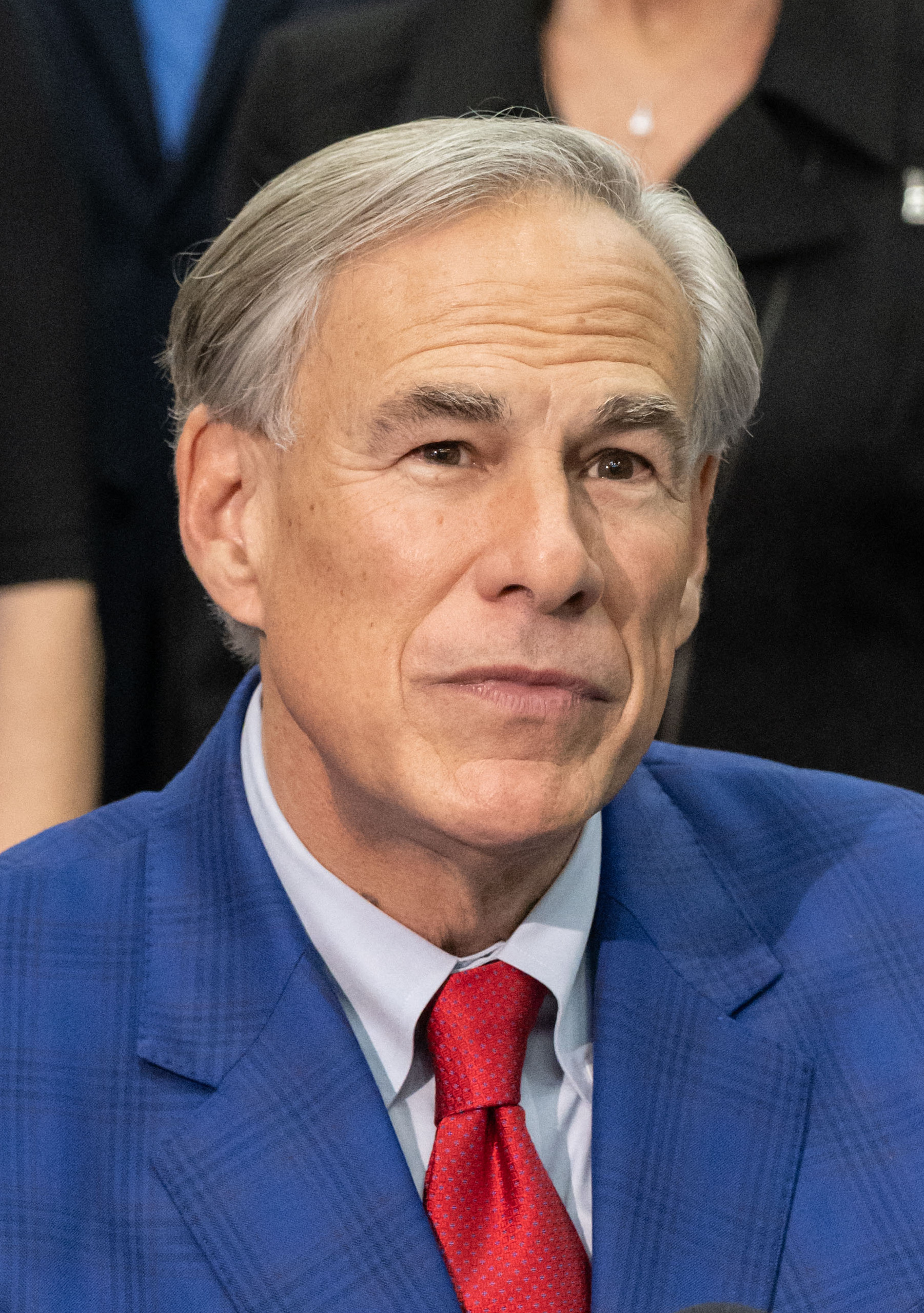
- Incumbent; Greg Abbott since January 20, 2015
- Executive branch of the Government of Texas; Office of the Governor of Texas
- Style: Governor (informal); The Honorable (formal); His/Her Excellency (courtesy)
- Type: Head of state; Head of government; Commander-in-chief
- Residence: Texas Governor's Mansion
- Seat: Austin, Texas
- Appointer: Popular vote
- Term length: Four years, no term limit
- Constituting instrument: Constitution of Texas
- Precursor: President of the Republic of Texas
- Formation: December 29, 1845 (180 years ago)
- First holder: James Pinckney Henderson (1846)
- Succession: Line of succession
- Deputy: Lieutenant Governor of Texas
- Salary: $153,750 (2019)
- Website: gov.texas.gov

The governor of Texas is the head of government of the U.S. state of Texas. The governor is the head of the executive branch of the government of Texas and is the commander-in-chief of the Texas Military Forces.

Established in the Constitution of Texas, the governor's responsibilities include ensuring the enforcement of state laws, the power to either approve or veto bills passed by the Texas Legislature, overseeing state agencies, issuing executive orders, proposing and overseeing the state budget, and making key appointments to state offices. The governor also has the power to call special sessions of the legislature and, with the recommendation of the Texas Board of Pardons and Paroles, grant pardons.

== Qualifications ==
Article IV, Section 4 of the Constitution of Texas sets three qualifications for candidates for governor of Texas:

- Be at least 30 years old;
- Be a citizen of the United States;
- Be a resident of Texas for at least five years preceding the election.

== Oath of office and election ==
Governors of Texas are directly elected by registered voters in Texas and serve terms of four years, with no term limits. Before executing the powers of the office, a governor is required to recite the oath of office as found in Article XVI, Section 1 of the Constitution of Texas:

I, _______________________, do solemnly swear (or affirm), that I will faithfully execute the duties of the office of governor of the State of Texas, and will to the best of my ability preserve, protect, and defend the Constitution and laws of the United States and of this State, so help me God.

Incoming Texas governors take office on the third Tuesday of January following an election.

== Historical development ==
The state's first constitution in 1845 established the office of governor, to serve for two years, but no more than four years out of every six (essentially a limit of no more than two consecutive terms). The 1861 secessionist constitution set the term start date at the first Monday in the November following the election. The 1866 constitution, adopted just after the American Civil War, increased terms to 4 years, but no more than 8 years out of every 12, and moved the start date to the first Thursday after the organization of the legislature, or "as soon thereafter as practicable". The Reconstruction-era constitution of 1869 removed the limit on terms, Texas remains one of 16 states, territory or jurisdiction (including the U.S. Territory of Puerto Rico and the District of Columbia) with no gubernatorial term limits. The present constitution of 1876 shortened terms back to two years, but a 1972 amendment increased it to four years again.

The gubernatorial election is held every four years on the Tuesday after the first Monday in November that does not coincide with the presidential elections. All gubernatorial elections have been a part of the midterm elections since the 1974 election, invalidating the latter. The governor is sworn in every four years along with the lieutenant governor.

Despite the lack of term limits, no Texas governor in the 19th or 20th century ever served more than seven and a half consecutive years in office (Allan Shivers) or eight years total service (Bill Clements, in two non-consecutive four-year terms). Former governor Rick Perry, who served from 2000 to 2015, surpassed both these records, becoming the first Texas governor to serve three consecutive four-year terms. When Perry won the general election on November 2, 2010, he joined Shivers, Price Daniel, and John Connally as the only Texas governors elected to three terms (the terms served by governors Shivers, Daniel, and Connally were two-year terms). On November 8, 2022, current governor Greg Abbott was re-elected and became the fifth Texas governor to serve three terms following Shivers, Daniel, Connally and Perry. In case of a vacancy in the office of governor, the lieutenant governor becomes governor. This rule was added only in a 1999 amendment, prior to which the lieutenant governor only acted as governor, except during the time of the 1861 constitution, which said that the lieutenant governor would be styled "Governor of the State of Texas" in case of vacancy.

The Lieutenant Governor of Texas has influence over state policy because of their control of the Texas Senate's agenda and committee assignments. This influence is close to that of the governor's in things like legislative matters like budgeting and election law.

On November 3, 2026, Democratic candidate Gina Hinojosa defeated incumbent Republican Governor Greg Abbott, who was seeking a fourth consecutive term. Hinojosa's victory marked the end of 32 years of Republican control of the Texas governorship and made her the first Democrat elected to the office since Ann Richards in 1990. She will also become the first Latina governor in Texas history and the third woman to hold the position.

Hinojosa is expected to assume office in January 2027, succeeding Abbott, who has served as governor since January 2015.

== Executive powers ==
Texas utilizes a plural executive government where no single government official is solely responsible for the Executive Branch. The Texas governor has a very minimal control over the Legislative Budget Board. The Lieutenant Governor and Speaker of the House manages the state's budget.

Texas has a unique plural executive system which provides that executive officials like the lieutenant governor, attorney general, comptroller, land commissioner, and the agriculture commissioner are elected independently. This significantly limits the governor's direct control over executive policies in comparison to other states that have centralized executive authority. As a result, while the Governor retains formal powers such as the ability to veto and appoint certain boards, topics like budgeting and agency oversight are left in the hands of the legislative branch. At the same time, this structure accurately reflects a common Texas belief in decentralized government and ensures that key powers are widely distributed so that no single official holds excessive control.

Under Texas Government Code Chapter 418, the governor can declare a state of disaster lasting up to 30 days unless renewed, issue executive orders with the force of law, suspend state regulatory statutes and rules, commandeer private property or resources, and direct evacuations or control the movement of people.

== Official residence and workplace ==
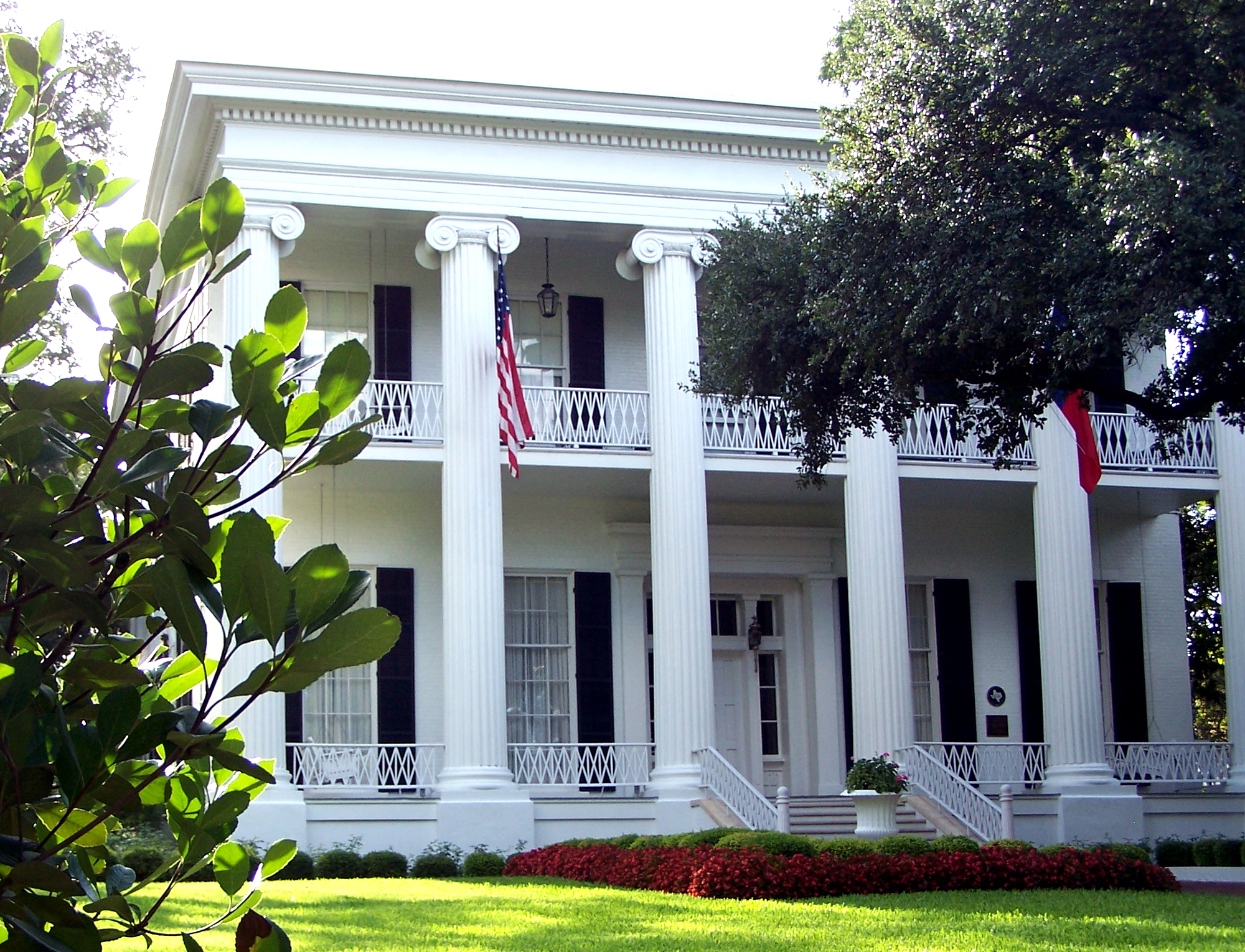
The Texas Governor's Mansion in Austin, Texas.

The official residence of the Texas governor is the Texas Governor's Mansion, in Austin. The mansion was built in 1854 and has been the home of every governor since 1856. It is also one of the official workplaces for the governor.

The governor's primary official workplace is located within the Texas State Capitol in Austin.

== Removal of a governor from office ==
The Texas governor can be impeached by the State House of Representatives for committing treason, bribery, or any other high crime or misdemeanor. Once the governor is impeached, the case is forwarded to the State Senate for trial. A two-thirds majority vote in the Senate is required to remove the governor from office. Unlike other states, Texas does not have a provision in the state constitution that allows voters to petition for a recall election to remove the governor. On the other hand, political scientists have shown that impeachment in Texas is very rare and often shaped by political considerations rather than just legal standards. (Stewart, 2014).

== Timeline ==
Timeline of Texas governors

== Line of succession ==
The gubernatorial line of succession is set by Article IV, Sections 3a and 16–18 of the Constitution of Texas and Chapter 401.023 of Title 4 the Texas Gov't Code.

No.	Office	Current officeholder	Party
1	Lieutenant Governor	Dan Patrick	Republican
2	President pro tempore of the Senate	Charles Perry	Republican
3	Speaker of the House of Representatives	Dustin Burrows	Republican
4	Attorney General	Ken Paxton	Republican
Chief Justices of the Texas Courts of Appeals, in numerical order
5	1st Court of Appeals (Houston)	Terry Adams	Republican
6	2nd Court of Appeals (Fort Worth)	Bonnie Sudderth	Republican
7	3rd Court of Appeals (Austin)	Darlene Byrne	Democratic
8	4th Court of Appeals (San Antonio)	Rebeca Martinez	Democratic
9	5th Court of Appeals (Dallas)	Robert Burns III	Democratic
10	6th Court of Appeals (Texarkana)	Josh Morriss	Republican
11	7th Court of Appeals (Amarillo)	Brian Quinn	Republican
12	8th Court of Appeals (El Paso)	Maria Salas-Mendoza	Democratic
13	9th Court of Appeals (Beaumont)	Scott Golemon	Republican
14	10th Court of Appeals (Waco)	Tom Gray	Republican
15	11th Court of Appeals (Eastland)	John M. Bailey	Republican
16	12th Court of Appeals (Tyler)	Jim Worthen	Republican
17	13th Court of Appeals (Corpus Christi)	Dori Contreras	Democratic
18	14th Court of Appeals (Houston)	Tracy Christopher	Republican

== See also ==
- List of Texas governors and presidents
- List of governors of Texas
- List of presidents of the Republic of Texas
- Lieutenant Governor of Texas
- List of Texas state agencies
