= Lists of lawsuits =

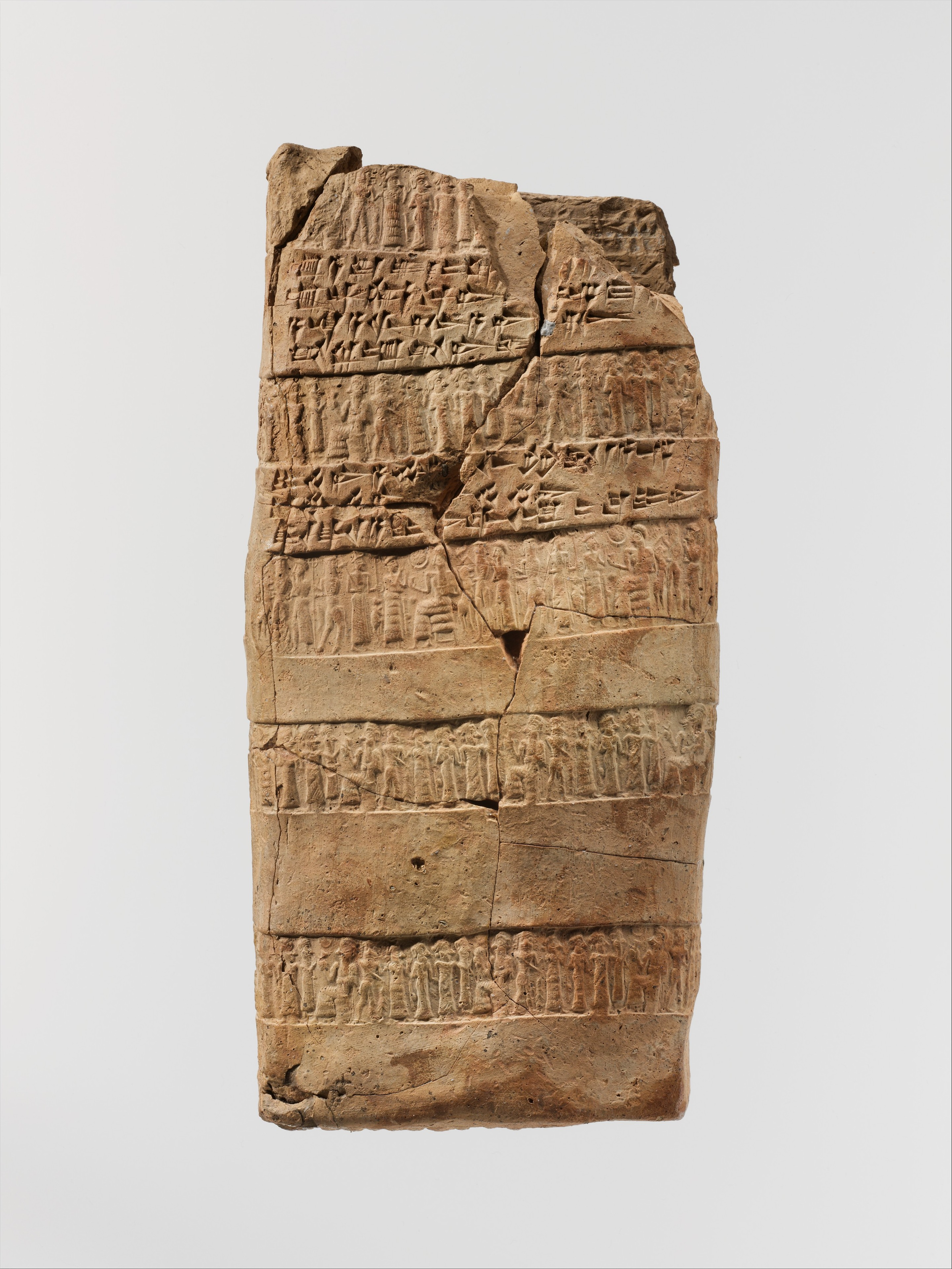
Cuneiform tablet case for record of a lawsuit ca. 20th–19th century B.C.

Lists of lawsuits cover various types of lawsuits. They are organized by topics and fields, and by individual companies or people.

== Fields or topics ==
- List of class-action lawsuits
- List of environmental lawsuits
- List of sex equality lawsuits
- List of medical ethics cases
- Pharmaceutical
  - List of largest civil only pharmaceutical settlements
  - List of largest pharmaceutical settlements
  - List of off-label promotion pharmaceutical settlements
- List of Social Security lawsuits
- List of WTO dispute settlement cases
- List of lawsuits involving Tesla, Inc.
- Post-election lawsuits related to the 2020 U.S. presidential election

== Individual companies or persons ==
- Apple Inc. litigation
- Deepwater Horizon litigation
- Lawsuits involving Dell Inc.
- Google litigation
- List of litigation involving the Electronic Frontier Foundation
- List of lawsuits and controversies of Tesla, Inc.
- List of lawsuits involving Donald Trump
- Litigation involving the Wikimedia Foundation
- Microsoft litigation
