= List of Social Security lawsuits =

This is a list of Social Security lawsuits.

- Astrue v. Capato (2012), a case in which the Supreme Court of the United States held that children conceived after a parent's death are not entitled to Social Security Survivors benefits if the laws in the state that the parent's will was signed in forbid it
- Bowen v. Roy (1986), a United States Supreme Court case which established limits on freedom of religion in the United States
- Califano v. Aznavorian (1978), a United States Supreme Court case upholding denial of Social Security Benefits to recipients while they are abroad as not violating the Fifth Amendment due process right to international travel
- Califano v. Goldfarb (1977), a decision by the United States Supreme Court, which held that the different treatment of men and women mandated by 42 U.S.C. § 402(f)(1)(D) constituted invidious discrimination against women wage earners
- Califano v. Webster (1977), where the United States Supreme Court upheld higher pre-1972 benefits for women to compensate for disparate treatment
- Califano v. Yamasaki (1979), in which the United States Supreme Court struck down overpayment recoupment limited statutory hearing rights as violative of due process
- Doe v. Chao (2004), a decision by the United States Supreme Court that interpreted the statutory damages provision of the Privacy Act of 1974
- Eastern Enterprises v. Apfel (1998), a United States Supreme Court case in which the Court held that the Coal Industry Retiree Health Benefit Act (Coal Act) constituted an unconstitutional regulatory taking of property which required the Act to be invalidated
- Flemming v. Nestor (1960), a United States Supreme Court case in which the Court upheld the constitutionality of Section 1104 of the 1935 Social Security Act
- Flores-Figueroa v. United States, a decision by the Supreme Court of the United States, holding that the law enhancing the sentence for identity theft requires proof that an individual knew that the identity card or number he had used belonged to another, actual person
- Goldberg v. Kelly (2009), a case in which the United States Supreme Court ruled that the Due Process Clause of the Fourteenth Amendment to the United States Constitution requires an evidentiary hearing before a recipient of certain government benefits (welfare) can be deprived of such benefit
- Heckler v. Campbell (1983)
- Helvering v. Davis (1937)
- Mathews v. Eldridge (1976)
- Mayo Foundation for Medical Education & Research v. United States (2011)
- Meyer v. Astrue (4th Cir. 2011)
- Richardson v. Perales (1971)
- Steward Machine Co. v. Davis (1937)
- Sullivan v. Zebley (1990)
- United States v. Lee (1982)
- Weinberger v. Wiesenfeld (1975)
