= Ferens v. John Deere Co. =

- Supreme Court of the United States

Decided March 5, 1990
- Full case name: Ferens v. John Deere Co.
- Citations: 494 U.S. 516 (more)

Holding
- The receiving court must apply the choice-of-law rules of the court where the case originated after a change of venue.

Court membership
- Chief Justice William Rehnquist Associate Justices William J. Brennan Jr. · Byron White; Thurgood Marshall · Harry Blackmun; John P. Stevens · Sandra Day O'Connor; Antonin Scalia · Anthony Kennedy

Case opinions
- Majority: Kennedy
- Dissent: Scalia, joined by Brennan, Marshall, Blackmun

Ferens v. John Deere Co., 494 U.S. 516 (1990), was a United States Supreme Court case in which the court held that the receiving court must apply the choice-of-law rules of the court where the case originated after a change of venue between federal district courts. This decision does not apply to transfers from improper venues or to Goldlawr transfers because, by definition, the rules of an improper forum cannot be binding.

== Background ==
The Ferens family sued after their husband lost a hand in Pennsylvania when it allegedly became caught in a harvester manufactured by respondent John Deere, a Delaware corporation. The Ferenses, Pennsylvania residents, delayed taking legal action against Deere until after Pennsylvania's 2-year tort limitations period expired. In the third year, they filed proper diversity suits (1) in a federal District Court in Pennsylvania, raising contract and warranty claims as to which the applicable Pennsylvania limitations period had not yet run, and (2) in a federal District Court in Mississippi, where Deere did business, alleging tort causes of action. As to the latter suit, petitioners knew that the federal court had to apply the Mississippi state courts' choice-of-law rules per Klaxon Co. v. Stentor Electric Manufacturing Co., meaning Mississippi's 6-year tort statute of limitations would apply. The Mississippi court then granted petitioners' motion to transfer the tort action to the Pennsylvania court under 28 U.S.C. § 1404(a), which allows such transfers "[f]or the convenience of parties and witnesses, in the interest of justice." However, the Pennsylvania court declined to honor the Mississippi tort statute of limitations, ruling that, since petitioners had moved for transfer as plaintiffs, the rule in Van Dusen v. Barrack—that, following a defendant-initiated § 1404(a) transfer, the transferee court must follow the choice-of-law rules prevailing in the transferor court—was inapplicable. The court therefore dismissed the tort action under Pennsylvania's tort statute of limitations, and the Court of Appeals affirmed.

== Opinion of the court ==
The Supreme Court issued an opinion on March 5, 1990. The court held that Van Dusen did apply.

== Subsequent developments ==
The Ferens decision has been criticized because it means that someone can sue in a court to "capture" its favorable choice-of-law rules and then forum shop for a more convenient venue.
