= United States v. Morgan =

United States v. Morgan is the name of a number of noted court cases:

- United States v. Morgan (1939) (307 U.S. 183), a U.S. Supreme Court case concerning temporary disposition of funds set aside due to anomalies in stockyard rate determinations
- United States v. Morgan (1941) (313 U.S. 409), a U.S. Supreme Court case establishing the Morgan Doctrine where the Court cautioned against the taking of depositions from high-ranking government officials.
- United States v. Morgan (1953) (118 F. Supp. 621 S.D.N.Y. 1953), a U.S. district court case involving antitrust accusations against 17 Wall Street firms and commonly referred to as the Investment Bankers Case
- United States v. Morgan (1954) (346 U.S. 502), a U.S. Supreme court case providing the writ of coram nobis for those who have completed a conviction's sentence

== See also ==
- Morgan v. United States (disambiguation)
