= Atlas Roofing Co. v. Occupational Safety and Health Review Commission =

- Supreme Court of the United States

Argued November 29, 1976 Decided March 23, 1977
- Full case name: Atlas Roofing Company, Inc. v. Occupational Safety and Health Review Commission
- Docket no.: 75-746
- Citations: 430 U.S. 442 (more)
- Opinion announcement: Opinion announcement

Holding
- The Occupational Safety and Health Act's right to workplace safety is a statutory public right exempt from the common law right to a trial by jury under the Seventh Amendment

Court membership
- Chief Justice Warren E. Burger Associate Justices William J. Brennan Jr. · Potter Stewart; Byron White · Thurgood Marshall; Harry Blackmun · Lewis F. Powell Jr. William Rehnquist · John P. Stevens

Case opinion
- Majority: White, joined by unanimous
- Blackmun took no part in the consideration or decision of the case.

Laws applied
- Seventh Amendment to the United States Constitution

Atlas Roofing Company, Inc. v. Occupational Safety and Health Review Commission, 430 U.S. 442 (1977), was a United States Supreme Court decision in administrative law. The decision held that the Seventh Amendment to the US Constitution did not require a jury trial to enforce the civil penalties for violating a federal "public rights" statute, allowing enforcement by an administrative agency.

== Background ==
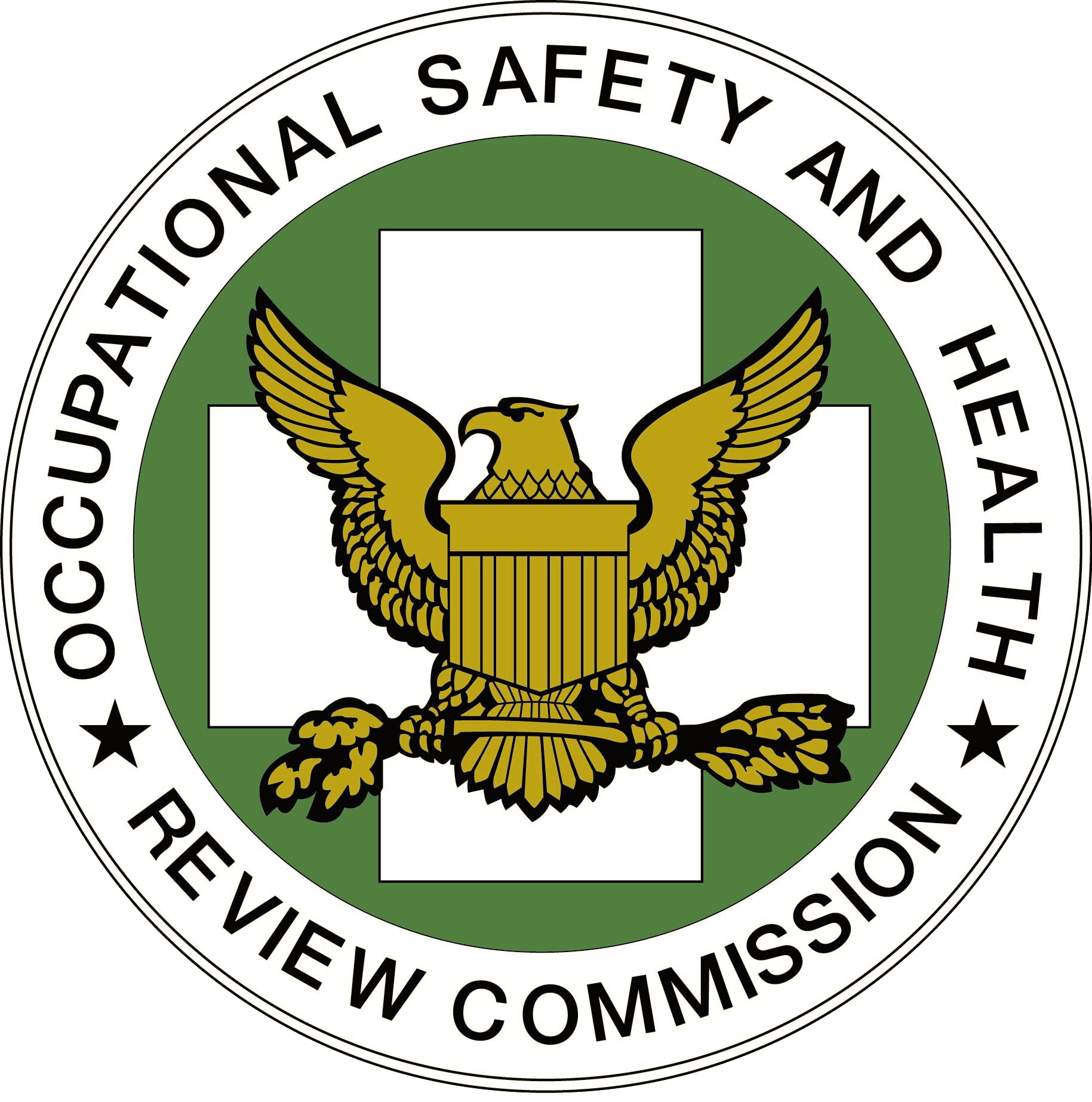
This case challenged the Occupational Safety and Health Review Commission's administrative law proceedings

In 1970, the US Congress enacted the Occupational Safety and Health Act, which required employers to maintain safe working conditions, in response to common law negligence and wrongful death claims failing to fully protect American workers. Under the OSH Act, the federal government could pursue civil penalties against unsafe workplaces and request abatement orders to compel workplace safety reforms by arguing their case before the Occupational Safety and Health Review Commission (OSHRC). An administrative law judge would assess questions of law and fact, and their verdict could be appealed to the full commission. Furthermore, an employer could seek judicial review of the OSHRC's decision from their court of appeals, but they would only receive a reassessment of questions of law.

In 1972, the Atlas Roofing Company was fined $600 ($4618 adjusted for inflation) by the US Secretary of Labor for violating federal regulations that required roof opening covers to be securely installed, which had resulted in the death of an employee. In Atlas Roofing's appeal to the Court of Appeals for the Fifth Circuit, they argued that their right to a jury trial in common law cases under the Seventh Amendment was infringed by the OSHRC's procedure. However, the Fifth Circuit ruled that "jury trials would be incompatible with the whole concept of administrative adjudication," leading Atlas Roofing to appeal its case to the Supreme Court.

== Supreme Court ruling ==
This case was consolidated with Frank Irey Jr. v. OSHRC, a case appealed from the Court of Appeals for the Third Circuit that similarly challenged whether administrative agencies could conduct their proceedings without a jury trial under the Seventh Amendment.

In a unanimous opinion written by Associate Justice Byron White, the Supreme Court held that the Seventh Amendment's right of trial by jury "in suits at common law" does not apply to cases concerning public rights created through federal statutes. In the Court's view, Congress' constitutional authority to enact the OSH Act's public right to a safe workplace included the ability to enforce that right through fact-finding and initial adjudication in an administrative forum, rather than a federal jury trial.

To support its Seventh Amendment interpretation, the Supreme Court cited Murray's Lessee v. Hoboken Land & Improvement Co., an 1856 case that recognized:

There are matters, involving public rights, which may be presented in such form that the judicial power is capable of acting on them, and which are susceptible of judicial determination, but which Congress may or may not bring within the cognizance of the courts of the United States, as it may deem proper.

— Murray's Lessee v. Hoboken Land & Improvement Co., 59 U.S. at 284

== Legacy ==
The Berkeley Journal of Employment & Labor Law criticized the ruling as allowing Article I legislative courts to subvert the role of Article III judicial courts, potentially denying Americans their constitutional rights and weakening the separation of powers under the US Constitution.

In the 2024 case SEC v. Jarkesy, the Supreme Court ruled that the Dodd–Frank Wall Street Reform and Consumer Protection Act's delegation of securities fraud enforcement to the Securities and Exchange Commission (SEC)'s administrative courts violated the Seventh Amendment right to a jury trial. While the majority reasoned that securities fraud was analogous to the common law crime of fraud, the dissent argued that whereas common law fraud claims are litigated by the party that has been defrauded, the Dodd-Frank reforms had granted a distinct public right from securities fraud in financial markets.
