= Chauffeurs, Teamsters, & Helpers Local No. 391 v. Terry =

Chauffeurs, Teamsters, and Helpers Local No. 391 v. Terry
- Supreme Court of the United States

Argued December 6, 1989 Decided March 20, 1990
- Full case name: Chauffeurs, Teamsters, and Helpers Local No. 391 v. Terry, et al.
- Citations: 494 U.S. 558 (more) 110 S. Ct. 1339; 108 L. Ed. 2d 519; 1990 U.S. LEXIS 1530; 58 U.S.L.W. 4345; 114 Lab. Cas. (CCH) ¶ 11,930; 133 L.R.R.M. 2793

Case history
- Prior: Terry v. Teamsters Local 391, 676 F. Supp. 659 (M.D.N.C. 1987); affirmed, 863 F.2d 334 (4th Cir. 1988); cert. granted, 491 U.S. 903 (1989).

Holding
- An action by an employee for a breach of a labor union's duty of fair representation entitles him to a jury trial under the Seventh Amendment.

Court membership
- Chief Justice William Rehnquist Associate Justices William J. Brennan Jr. · Byron White; Thurgood Marshall · Harry Blackmun; John P. Stevens · Sandra Day O'Connor; Antonin Scalia · Anthony Kennedy

Case opinions
- Majority: Marshall (parts I, II, III-B, IV), joined by Rehnquist, Brennan, White, Blackmun, Stevens
- Concurrence: Marshall (part III-A), joined by Rehnquist, White, Blackmun
- Concurrence: Brennan
- Concurrence: Stevens
- Dissent: Kennedy, joined by O'Connor, Scalia

Laws applied
- U.S. Const. amend. VII; 29 U.S.C. § 185

Chauffeurs, Teamsters, and Helpers Local No. 391 v. Terry, 494 U.S. 558 (1990), was a case in which the United States Supreme Court held that an action by an employee for a breach of a labor union's duty of fair representation entitled him to a jury trial under the Seventh Amendment.

== Facts ==
McLean Trucking Corporation and the defendant/petitioner union, Chauffeurs, Teamsters, and Helpers Local No. 391, were parties to a collective bargaining agreement which governed employment at McLean. The plaintiffs/respondents in this matter were union members employed as truck drivers by McLean. In 1982, McLean began to shut down some of its terminals and reorganizing others. The company transferred plaintiffs to its terminal in Winston-Salem, North Carolina, and granted them special seniority rights over inactive employees at that terminal who had been temporarily laid off.

After working at Winston-Salem for six weeks, the plaintiffs were alternately laid off and recalled several times. Some of the laid off truckers were stripped of their special seniority rights. The plaintiffs filed a grievance with the union, alleging that McLean had breached the collective bargaining agreement by giving inactive employees preference over them. The grievance committee ordered McLean to recall the plaintiffs and lay off the inactive drivers who had been recalled, and to recognize plaintiffs' special seniority rights until the inactive employees were recalled properly. McLean obeyed the order of the grievance committee at first, but then recalled the inactive employees, causing them to gain seniority status over the plaintiffs. In the next round of layoffs, this meant that the plaintiffs were laid off first. Plaintiffs then filed another grievance with the union, alleging that McLean's actions were intended to circumvent the grievance committee's initial order. But the grievance committee held that McLean had acted legitimately. This pattern of temporary layoffs and recalls continued, prompting plaintiffs to file another grievance, but the union did not refer the third grievance to a grievance committee, instead ruling that the relevant issues had already been decided.

In July 1983, plaintiffs brought suit against both the union and McLean in the United States District Court for the Middle District of North Carolina, alleging that McLean had violated the collective bargaining agreement in violation of the Labor Management Relations Act, 29 U.S.C. § 185, and alleging that the union had breached its duty of fair representation. Plaintiffs requested a permanent injunction requiring the defendants to restore their seniority and cease their illegal activity. They further requested compensatory damages for lost wages and health benefits. McLean filed for bankruptcy in 1986, and all the claims against it were voluntarily dismissed.

Plaintiffs had requested a jury trial in their pleadings, but the union moved to strike the demand for a jury trial, on the grounds that no right to a jury trial exists in a duty of fair representation suit. The District Court denied the defendant's motion to strike, and the United States Court of Appeals for the Fourth Circuit affirmed, holding that the Seventh Amendment entitled the plaintiffs to a jury trial on their claims for monetary damages.

== Decision ==
=== Majority opinion ===
Justice Marshall wrote for the majority. He began his opinion by explaining that the right to a jury trial provided by the Seventh Amendment encompasses more than the common law forms of action recognized in 1791 (when the Bill of Rights was ratified), but rather any lawsuit in which parties' legal rights were to be determined, as opposed to suits which only involve equitable rights and remedies.

Using the two-part test established in Tull, the court must first compare the statutory action created by Congress to the 18th century actions brought in the courts of England prior to the merger of the courts of law and equity; then, examine the remedy sought by the plaintiff to determine whether it was legal or equitable in nature. The second step is the more important one.

Since actions to enforce collective bargaining agreements were unknown in 18th-century England (such agreements were unlawful at the time), the union argued that the action brought by the plaintiffs was, in essence, an attempt to vacate an arbitration award, which historically was considered an action in equity. Marshall rejected this argument because there had been no arbitration with regards to the union's duty of fair representation. The union further argued that the suit was comparable to an action for breach of fiduciary duty (e.g. a suit concerning a trust), which was also considered an equitable action. The plaintiffs countered by comparing their suit to an action against an attorney for malpractice, which was an action at law.

Marshall conceded that the analogy to a trust action was more convincing, but reasoned that the right to a jury trial depended more on the nature of the issues to be tried. Although there was a fiduciary duty issue between the plaintiffs and the union, there was also an underlying breach of contract—that of the collective bargaining agreement between McLean and the plaintiffs.

Since the first part of the analysis failed to produce a dispositive result, Marshall then turned to the type of relief the plaintiffs sought. The only remaining remedy the plaintiffs sought against the union was compensatory damages, which are the traditional legal remedy. While restitutionary remedies such as back pay and benefits may be characterized as equitable when sought from an employer, the damages here were sought from the union. Thus, Marshall held that the plaintiffs were requesting a legal remedy, and therefore, on the balance of the issues, were entitled to have their case heard by a jury.

=== Brennan's concurrence ===
Justice Brennan concurred, but desired to simplify the test for determining a plaintiff's Seventh Amendment rights. Justice Brennan argued that it was time to dispense with the two-step historical test used to determine the scope of the Seventh Amendment right to a jury trial. Instead, he proposed to decide such questions solely on the basis of the nature of the relief sought—that is, to abandon the first step of the historical test and retain only the second step.

He reasoned that most judges are not legal historians and lack both the time and training to engage in the exhaustive historical research that the first step requires, a problem that, in his view, would only become more acute in the future. Brennan also observed that the line between law and equity in eighteenth-century England was not clearly defined, as there were no inherently “legal” or “equitable” issues.

While he did not advocate abandoning historical reasoning altogether, he warned that the first prong of the test often forces courts to compare modern statutory actions with eighteenth-century English causes of action so remote in form and concept that the exercise amounts to a “manufacture of historical fiction.” Limiting the analysis to the second step—whether the remedy sought is traditionally legal or equitable—would preserve an appropriate historical connection while offering a simpler, clearer, and more manageable approach for modern courts.

=== Stevens' concurrence ===
Justice Stevens concurred separately. Justice Stevens argued that the majority relied on the wrong analogy in determining whether a jury trial was appropriate. He emphasized that legal malpractice provided the better comparison because, like lawyers, unions advocate for their clients, and those clients depend on their professional judgment.

The proper historical inquiry, Stevens explained, is not whether such a suit was “specifically recognized at common law,” but whether “the nature of the substantive right asserted is analogous to common law rights” and whether “the relief sought is typical of an action at law.” When an action enforces rights and remedies “of the sort typically enforced in an action at law,” he reasoned, a jury trial must be available unless there is a strong functional reason to deny it.

By contrast, the equitable reasoning of trust law, with its reliance on “the sophisticated judgment of the jurist, the accountant, and the chancellor,” is suited to reviewing complex future interests—not resolving workplace grievances. In Stevens’s view, “the common sense understanding of the jury, selected to represent the community, is appropriately invoked when disputes in the factory, the warehouse, and the garage must be resolved”; therefore, a jury trial is simply more appropriate.

=== Dissent ===
Justice Kennedy, with whom Justices O'Connor and Scalia joined, dissented, arguing that the majority's analogy to an equitable trust action should have been dispositive in this case. He further argued that the relationship between the union and its workers was more similar to the relationship between a trustee and a beneficiary than an attorney and his client, because a union had a duty of fair representation to all of its workers and did not normally be compelled to act as an agent by one beneficiary.

Justice Kennedy proposed to keep the first step of the historical step and abandon the second step: once a claim is determined to be historically equitable, inquiry should end and there is no need for the second step (determining whether the remedies are legal or equitable). This approach is the opposite to that of Justice Brennen.

Justice Kennedy defended the historical comparison of the cause of action to the "suits at common law" available in 1791. He felt that to expand the right beyond what was available to plaintiffs at the time of the ratification of the Bill of Rights was nothing more than rewriting the Constitution, stating "[w]e cannot preserve a right existing in 1791 unless we look to history to identify it."

== See also ==
- List of United States Supreme Court cases, volume 494
- List of United States Supreme Court cases
- Lists of United States Supreme Court cases by volume
- List of United States Supreme Court cases by the Rehnquist Court
