= Reves v. Ernst & Young =

- Supreme Court of the United States

Argued November 27, 1989 Decided February 21, 1990
- Full case name: Reves, et al. v. Ernst & Young
- Citations: 494 U.S. 56 (more)

Court membership
- Chief Justice William Rehnquist Associate Justices William J. Brennan Jr. · Byron White; Thurgood Marshall · Harry Blackmun; John P. Stevens · Sandra Day O'Connor; Antonin Scalia · Anthony Kennedy

Case opinions
- Majority: Marshall, joined by unanimous (part II); Brennan, Blackmun, Stevens, Kennedy (parts I, III, IV)
- Concurrence: Stevens
- Concur/dissent: Rehnquist, joined by White, O'Connor, Scalia

Laws applied
- Securities Exchange Act of 1934

Reves v. Ernst & Young, 494 U.S. 56 (1990), was a United States Supreme Court case regarding whether the sale of "uncollateralized and uninsured promissory notes payable on demand by the holder" by the Farmers Cooperative of Arkansas and Oklahoma were securities under the Securities Exchange Act of 1934.

The majority opinion authored by Associate Justice Thurgood Marshall held that the "demand notes were securities within the meaning of section 3(a)(10) of the 1934 Act" and "rejected the application of the Howey and Landreth Timber tests to note transactions".

Instead, the Court established the Reves test, based on a family resemblance test created by the Second Circuit.

… the traditional rule is that bonds are securities and loans aren’t. This rule is sometimes cited to a 1990 case called Reves v. Ernst & Young, in which the US Supreme Court said that "the phrase 'any note'" in the definition of a security "should not be interpreted to mean literally 'any note.'" It set out a very woolly test for when a loan is a security:

— Matt Levine, "Loans Still Aren’t Securities", Bloomberg.com, August 28, 2023.
