= Watson v. Buck =

- Supreme Court of the United States

Decided May 26, 1941
- Full case name: Watson v. Buck
- Citations: 313 U.S. 387 (more)

Holding
- The Copyright Act does not authorize copyright holders to violate valid antitrust laws.

Court membership
- Chief Justice Charles E. Hughes Associate Justices Harlan F. Stone · Owen Roberts; Hugo Black · Stanley F. Reed; Felix Frankfurter · William O. Douglas; Frank Murphy

Case opinion
- Majority: Black, joined by unanimous
- Murphy took no part in the consideration or decision of the case.

Laws applied
- Copyright Act of 1909

Watson v. Buck, 313 U.S. 387 (1941), was a United States Supreme Court case in which the court held that the Copyright Act does not authorize copyright holders to violate valid antitrust laws.

== Description ==
In this case, the Supreme Court determined that the American Society of Composers, Authors and Publishers, which formed to centralize and organize the licensing of music performance rights, was an illegal trust.
