= Weinberger v. Wiesenfeld =

- Supreme Court of the United States

Argued January 20, 1975 Decided March 19, 1975
- Full case name: Caspar Weinberger, Secretary of Health, Education, and Welfare v. Stephen Wiesenfeld
- Citations: 420 U.S. 636 (more) 95 S. Ct. 1225; 43 L. Ed. 2d 514; 1975 U.S. LEXIS 48

Case history
- Prior: Wiesenfeld v. Secretary of Health, Education & Welfare, 367 F. Supp. 981 (D.N.J. 1973); probable jurisdiction noted, 419 U.S. 822 (1974).

Holding
- The gender-based distinction under 42 U.S.C. § 402(g) of the Social Security Act violates the right to equal protection secured by the Due Process Clause of the Fifth Amendment.

Court membership
- Chief Justice Warren E. Burger Associate Justices William O. Douglas · William J. Brennan Jr. Potter Stewart · Byron White; Thurgood Marshall · Harry Blackmun; Lewis F. Powell Jr. · William Rehnquist

Case opinions
- Majority: Brennan, joined by Burger, Stewart, White, Marshall, Blackmun, Powell
- Concurrence: Powell, joined by Burger
- Concurrence: Rehnquist (in result)
- Douglas took no part in the consideration or decision of the case.

Laws applied
- 42 U.S.C. § 402(g); U.S. Const. amend. V

Weinberger v. Wiesenfeld, 420 U.S. 636 (1975), was a decision by the United States Supreme Court, which unanimously held that the gender-based distinction under 42 U.S.C. § 402(g) of the Social Security Act of 1935—which permitted widows but not widowers to collect special benefits while caring for minor children—violated the right to equal protection secured by the Due Process Clause of the Fifth Amendment to the United States Constitution.

== Background ==
Stephen Wiesenfeld and Paula Polatschek were married in 1970. Stephen ran a minicomputer consulting business and had an irregular income. Paula taught mathematics at Edison High School and earned significantly more than her husband. When Paula died in childbirth from an amniotic embolism, Stephen became the sole provider for their newborn son, Jason. To take care of his son, Stephen cut his work hours and sought child care. Wiesenfeld contested his ineligibility for Social Security survivors' benefits that were made available to widows, but not to widowers. Caspar Weinberger, the Secretary of Health, Education, and Welfare (1973–75), appealed the case to the Supreme Court.

Rutgers Law School professor Ruth Bader Ginsburg, along with Melvin Wulf, took on Weinberger v. Wiesenfeld after several unfavorable Supreme Court decisions on gender discrimination cases. In 1974, Kahn v. Shevin had upheld differences in property tax exemption between widows and widowers, and the Supreme Court ruled in Geduldig v. Aiello that denying compensation from work loss due to pregnancy did not violate the Fourteenth Amendment. Ginsburg looked to Weinberger v. Wiesenfeld to promote the idea of "the care of two loving parents, rather than just one."

Ginsburg made the argument that Section 402(g) of the Social Security Act discriminated against Stephen Wiesenfeld by not providing him with the same survivors' benefits as it would to a widow. Further, Ginsburg argued that Paula's contributions to Social Security were not treated on an equal basis to salaried men, so she was also being discriminated against.

== Decision ==
All of the Eight sitting justices voted in favor of Wiesenfeld, while Justice Douglas was not sitting due to illness. They declared that Section 402(g) of the Social Security Act was unconstitutional on the grounds that the gender based distinctions violated the Due Process Clause of the Fifth Amendment.

Justice Brennan wrote in the Court's opinion:

Since the Constitution forbids the gender-based differentiation premised upon assumptions as to dependency made in the statutes before us in Frontiero, the Constitution also forbids the gender-based differentiation that results in the efforts of female workers required to pay social security taxes producing less protection for their families than is produced by the efforts of men.

The Court differentiated the Social Security matter from the decision in Kahn v. Shevin. The court decided that Section 402(g):

linked as it is directly to responsibility for minor children, was intended to permit women to elect not to work and to devote themselves to the care of children. Since this purpose in no way is premised upon any special disadvantages of women, it cannot serve to justify a gender-based distinction which diminishes the protection afforded to women who do work.

== Subsequent developments ==
Wiesenfeld himself received no monetary benefits from the decision. By the time he initiated the case, he had shut down his consulting business and obtained a well-paid position at a computer company. His salary thus exceeded the income cutoff for receiving Social Security benefits.

Ginsburg helped highlight the idea that the social security provision had discriminated against men acting as caregivers, and women serving as breadwinners. Brennan ruled that "such a gender-based generalization cannot suffice to justify the denigration...of women who do work and whose earnings contribute significantly to their families' support." The decision aimed to establish that it is just as important for a child to be cared for by the male parent, as they will encounter the same difficulties in parenting as the female parent. The court's ruling challenged the traditional male breadwinner/female homemaker model in terms of allocating government benefits. This case gave widowed men the opportunities to collect Social Security for their dependent children, which was only allowed for widowed mothers to collect before this court case. Like men, women could now have their Social Security benefit their families if they died. Though Weinberger v. Wiesenfeld was considered a victory for feminists, the court still was unclear on distinguishing between sex-based classifications that were damaging to women and those that nurtured sexual equality. Gender based social security questions would continue to be explored further in cases such as Califano v. Goldfarb, which Ginsburg was also involved in, and later in Califano v. Webster, for which Weinberger v. Wiesenfeld had helped lay important groundwork.

== See also ==
- Gender equality
- List of gender equality lawsuits
- Califano v. Goldfarb (1977)
- Geduldig v. Aiello (1974)
