= List of United States Supreme Court cases, volume 313 =

This is a list of all the United States Supreme Court cases from volume 313 of the United States Reports:

| Case name | Citation | Date decided |
|---|---|---|
| Maguire v. Commissioner | 313 U.S. 1 | 1941 |
| Helvering, Commissioner of Internal Revenue v. Gambrill | 313 U.S. 11 | 1941 |
| Helvering, Commissioner of Internal Revenue v. Campbell | 313 U.S. 15 | 1941 |
| National Labor Relations Board v. White Swan Company | 313 U.S. 23 | 1941 |
| Hort v. Commissioner | 313 U.S. 28 | 1941 |
| Nye v. United States | 313 U.S. 33 | 1941 |
| United States v. Resler | 313 U.S. 57 | 1941 |
| Department of Treasury v. Wood Preserving Corporation | 313 U.S. 62 | 1941 |
| Skiriotes v. Florida | 313 U.S. 69 | 1941 |
| Mitchell v. United States | 313 U.S. 80 | 1941 |
| Hudson and M. Railroad Company v. United States | 313 U.S. 98 | 1941 |
| Shamrock Oil and Gas Corporation v. Sheets | 313 U.S. 100 | 1941 |
| California v. Thompson | 313 U.S. 109 | 1941 |
| Caskey Baking Company v. Virginia | 313 U.S. 117 | 1941 |
| City Bank Farmers Trust Company v. Helvering, Commissioner of Internal Revenue | 313 U.S. 121 | 1941 |
| United States v. Pyne | 313 U.S. 127 | 1941 |
| Arkansas Corporation Commission v. Thompson | 313 U.S. 132 | 1941 |
| Pittsburgh Plate Glass Company v. National Labor Relations Board | 313 U.S. 146 | 1941 |
| Phelps Dodge Corporation v. National Labor Relations Board | 313 U.S. 177 | 1941 |
| Continental Oil Company v. National Labor Relations Board | 313 U.S. 212 | 1941 |
| Sampsell v. Imperial Paper and Color Corporation | 313 U.S. 215 | 1941 |
| Gelfert v. National City Bank | 313 U.S. 221 | 1941 |
| Olsen v. Nebraska ex rel. W. Reference & Bond Association, Inc. | 313 U.S. 236 | 1941 |
| Helvering, Commissioner of Internal Revenue v. William Flaccus Oak Leather Company | 313 U.S. 247 | 1941 |
| Department of Treasury v. Ingram-Richardson Manufacturing Company | 313 U.S. 252 | 1941 |
| Jenkins v. Kurn | 313 U.S. 256 | 1941 |
| Detrola Radio and Telephone Corporation v. Hazeltine Corporation | 313 U.S. 259 | 1941 |
| Sampayo v. Bank of Nova Scotia | 313 U.S. 270 | 1941 |
| United States v. Alabama | 313 U.S. 274 | 1941 |
| City of New York v. Feiring | 313 U.S. 283 | 1941 |
| Royal Indemnity Company v. United States | 313 U.S. 289 | 1941 |
| United States v. Classic | 313 U.S. 299 | 1941 |
| Holiday v. Johnston | 313 U.S. 342 | 1941 |
| Brooks v. Dewar | 313 U.S. 354 | 1941 |
| Wood v. Lovett | 313 U.S. 362 | 1941 |
| Watson v. Buck | 313 U.S. 387 | 1941 |
| Marsh v. Buck | 313 U.S. 406 | 1941 |
| United States v. Morgan | 313 U.S. 409 | 1941 |
| Helvering, Commissioner of Internal Revenue v. Reynolds | 313 U.S. 428 | 1941 |
| Cary v. Internal Revenue Service | 313 U.S. 441 | 1941 |
| United States v. A.S. Kreider Company | 313 U.S. 443 | 1941 |
| Union Pacific Railroad Company v. United States | 313 U.S. 450 | 1941 |
| Klaxon Co. v. Stentor Elec. Mfg. Co. | 313 U.S. 487 | 1941 |
| Griffin v. McCoach | 313 U.S. 498 | 1941 |
| Oklahoma ex rel. Phillips v. Guy F. Atkinson Company | 313 U.S. 508 | 1941 |
