= Skiriotes v. Florida =

- Supreme Court of the United States

Argued March 14, 1941 Decided April 28, 1941
- Full case name: Lambris Skiriotes v. State of Florida
- Docket no.: 658
- Citations: 313 U.S. 69 (more)

Case history
- Prior: Skiriotes v. State, 144 Fla. 220, 197 So. 736 (Fla. 1940)

Holding
- A state operating under the Tenth Amendment may regulate or criminalize the conduct of their citizens in the sea when not in conflict with federal law.

Court membership
- Chief Justice Charles E. Hughes Associate Justices Harlan F. Stone · Owen Roberts; Hugo Black · Stanley F. Reed; Felix Frankfurter · William O. Douglas; Frank Murphy

Case opinion
- Majority: Hughes, joined by Stone, Roberts, Black, Reed, Frankfurter, Douglas, Murphy

Laws applied
- Tenth Amendment, Adams–Onís Treaty

Skiriotes v. Florida, 313 U.S. 69 (1941), was a Supreme Court case in which the Court held that the states, under the authority of the Tenth Amendment, do have the authority to govern their citizens' conduct in the sea, when not in conflict of federal law. The Appellant in this case challenged his conviction under a Florida law which prohibited citizens from using diving equipment to gather sponges in the Gulf of Mexico or the Straits of Florida. It also further allowed States to have a broad authority in deciding their own maritime boundary, when approved by Congress.

== Historical context ==
This case begins on March 8, 1938, when Lambris Skiriotes, a resident of Pinellas County, Florida, was spotted using diving equipment two marine leagues (6 miles) off the coast of Pinellas County. The sheriff of the county shortly thereafter went to the Pinellas County Courthouse and requested an arrest warrant against Skiriotes, which was granted and executed. Interestingly, Skiriotes challenged his imprisonment to a United States district court with a writ of habeas corpus, which was granted but reversed by the U.S. Court of Appeals for the Fifth Circuit in Cunningham v. Skiriotes, 101 F.2d 635 (1939).

Nevertheless, Skiriotes was found guilty of violating the Compiled General Laws of Florida (1927), Section 8087 by Circuit Judge John U. Bird. The criminal statute reads as follows:

"It shall be unlawful for any person, persons, firm or corporation to maintain an'd use for the purpose of catching or taking commercial sponges from the Gulf of Mexico, or the straits of Florida or other waters within the territorial limits of the state of Florida, diving suits, helmets, or other apparatus used by deep sea divers. Anyone violating any of the provisions of this section shall be fined in the sum not exceeding five hundred dollars, or by imprisonment not exceeding one year, or by both such fine and imprisonment."

=== Appeal to the Florida Supreme Court ===
Following his conviction, Skiriotes filed a petition for a writ of certiorari to the Supreme Court of Florida to review his case. On September 6, 1940, Chief Justice William Glenn Terrell, on behalf of Justice Elwyn Thomas, Justice James B. Whitfield, Justice Armstead Brown, Justice Rivers H. Buford, and Justice Roy H. Chapman, wrote the majority opinion of the court, in which it ruled unanimously against him and denied his petition.

The court reviewed Skiriotes' review which was based on the argument that Florida lacked jurisdiction to prosecute him at any point in the water past one marine league (3 miles) off the coast, seeing as the territorial jurisdiction of the United States only extended that far. He argued that the Florida Constitution approved by the United States Congress in 1885 which set the Florida maritime limit at three marine leagues (9 miles) was contrary to international law, which generally recognized a nation's maritime limit to be one marine league. The Court recognized as such, stating,

"In the absence of affirmative action on this point the Supreme Court of the United States has generally assumed the sovereignty of the State to extend one marine league from shore. This distance was fixed because it was at the time considered to be the range of a cannon shot and that the State should be permitted to protect that distance from its shore."

Skiriotes further argued that when Congress passed an act readmitting Florida into the Union, although making reference to its 1868 Constitution, did not "constitute an approval" of such, and thus did not give Florida the authority to set its maritime boundary at three marine leagues. The Court however, disagreed entirely, ultimately stating,

"[I]t appears that any State by approval of Congress has a right to fix its marine boundaries and that if fixed in reason, such right has never been questioned by Congress by any other nation or citizen thereof...It follows that the western boundary of Florida as defined in its Constitution at three marine leagues from shore is conclusive and being so by the agreed statement of facts, petitioner was guilty of violating Section 8087"

Following the decision, Skiriotes once again sought appellate review, and this time filed a petition for a writ of certiorari to the Supreme Court of the United States.

== Supreme Court of the United States ==
The Supreme Court did grant Skiriotes' petition, and on March 14, 1941, held oral arguments, and handed down its decision on April 28, 1941. Writing for a unanimous Court, Chief Justice Charles Evans Hughes handed down the Court's majority opinion in favor of the State of Florida.

The Court firstly tackled the international law issue raised by Skiriotes, in which he now opted to raise various constitutional sections, treaties, and correspondence of the United States. The Supreme Court, noting the prior opinion of the Florida Court, cast aside these challenges, stating,

"[N]one of the treaties which appellant cites is applicable to his case. He is not in a position to invoke the rights of other governments or of the nationals of other countries."

The Supreme Court then further addressed an argument that the Florida law contradicted with a law passed by Congress on the regulation of sponge fishing as well, thereby meaning the Florida law must be void due to the Supremacy Clause. The Supreme Court did an examination of the federal law (16 U.S.C § 781), which states as follows,

"Sec . 2. That the presence of sponges of a diameter of less than five inches on any vessel or boat of the United States engaged in sponging in the waters of the Gulf of Mexico or the Straits of Florida outside of State territorial limits, or the possession of any sponges of less than the said diameter sold or delivered by such vessels, shall be prima facie evidence of a violation of this Act. Sec . 3. That every person, partnership, or association guilty of a violation of this Act shall be liable to a fine of not more than $500, and in addition such fine shall be a lien against the vessel or boat on which the offense is committed, and said vessel or boat shall be seized and proceeded against by process of libel in any court having jurisdiction of the offense."

The Court reasoned that the Florida law is not in conflict due to the federal statute being "limited to the particular matter of size", and that while the Florida law went farther than the federal law, that fact did not mean the laws were in conflict. The Court stated on this point,

"According to familiar principles, Congress having occupied but a limited field, the authority of the State to protect its interests by additional or supplementary legislation otherwise valid is not impaired. Reid v. Colorado, 187 U.S. 137 (1902)."

The Court having stated this, in essence completely invalidated the argument of Skiriotes, and once again stated the "appellant has no standing to invoke" any of the treaties involved or referenced, and subsequently denied the argument of any conflict with federal law. The Court set its final remarks as,

"[T]he State had power to prohibit the described conduct of its citizen at that place, we are not concerned, from the standpoint of the Federal Constitution, with the ruling of the state court as to the extent of territorial waters. The question before us must be considered in the light of the total power the State possesses...we find no ground for holding that the action of the State with respect to appellant transcended the limits of that power."
