= List of United States Supreme Court cases, volume 430 =

This is a list of all the United States Supreme Court cases from volume 430 of the United States Reports:

| Case name | Citation | Date decided |
|---|---|---|
| Piper v. Chris-Craft Indus., Inc. | 430 U.S. 1 | 1977 |
| Delaware Tribal Bus. Comm. v. Weeks | 430 U.S. 73 | 1977 |
| Califano v. Sanders | 430 U.S. 99 | 1977 |
| E.I. du Pont de Nemours & Co. v. Train | 430 U.S. 112 | 1977 |
| United States v. Florida | 430 U.S. 140 | 1977 |
| City of Philadelphia v. New Jersey | 430 U.S. 141 | 1977 |
| United Jewish Org. v. Carey | 430 U.S. 144 | 1977 |
| Marks v. United States | 430 U.S. 188 | 1977 |
| Califano v. Goldfarb | 430 U.S. 199 | 1977 |
| Nolde Bros., Inc. v. Bakery Workers | 430 U.S. 243 | 1977 |
| Lockport v. Citizens for Cmty. Action | 430 U.S. 259 | 1977 |
| Complete Auto Transit, Inc. v. Brady | 430 U.S. 274 | 1977 |
| Farmer v. Carpenters | 430 U.S. 290 | 1977 |
| Okla. Pub. Co. v. Dist. Ct. | 430 U.S. 308 | 1977 |
| Califano v. Webster | 430 U.S. 313 | 1977 |
| Morales v. Turman | 430 U.S. 322 | 1977 |
| Costello v. Wainwright | 430 U.S. 325 | 1977 |
| Juidice v. Vail | 430 U.S. 327 | 1977 |
| Gardner v. Florida | 430 U.S. 349 | 1977 |
| Swain v. Pressley | 430 U.S. 372 | 1977 |
| Brewer v. Williams | 430 U.S. 387 | 1977 |
| Atlas Roofing Co. v. Occupational Safety and Health Review Commission | 430 U.S. 442 | 1977 |
| Santa Fe Indus., Inc. v. Green | 430 U.S. 462 | 1977 |
| Castaneda v. Partida | 430 U.S. 482 | 1977 |
| Jones v. Rath Packing Co. | 430 U.S. 519 | 1977 |
| Maness v. Wainwright | 430 U.S. 550 | 1977 |
| Nat'l Geographic Soc'y v. Cal. Bd. of Equalization | 430 U.S. 551 | 1977 |
| United States v. Martin Linen Supply Co. | 430 U.S. 564 | 1977 |
| Sioux Tribe v. Kneip | 430 U.S. 584 | 1977 |
| Alexander v. Fioto | 430 U.S. 634 | 1977 |
| United States v. Antelope | 430 U.S. 641 | 1977 |
| Ingraham v. Wright | 430 U.S. 651 | 1977 |
| Vorchheimer v. Sch. Dist. | 430 U.S. 703 | 1977 |
| Darden v. Florida | 430 U.S. 704 | 1977 |
| Wooley v. Maynard | 430 U.S. 705 | 1977 |
| Gravitt v. Sw. Bell Tel. Co. | 430 U.S. 723 | 1977 |
| United States v. Consumer Life Ins. Co. | 430 U.S. 725 | 1977 |
| Trimble v. Gordon | 430 U.S. 762 | 1977 |
| Fiallo v. Bell | 430 U.S. 787 | 1977 |
| Bounds v. Smith | 430 U.S. 817 | 1977 |
