= List of United States Supreme Court cases, volume 494 =

This is a list of all the United States Supreme Court cases from volume 494 of the United States Reports:

Case name	Citation	Date decided
Preseault v. ICC	494 U.S. 1	1990
Dole v. Steelworkers	494 U.S. 26	1990
Reves v. Ernst & Young	494 U.S. 56	1990
Sullivan v. Everhart	494 U.S. 83	1990
Selvage v. Collins	494 U.S. 108	1990
Texas v. New Mexico	494 U.S. 111	1990
Zinermon v. Burch	494 U.S. 113	1990
Crandon v. United States	494 U.S. 152	1990
Carden v. Arkoma Assoc.	494 U.S. 185	1990
Washington v. Harper	494 U.S. 210	1990
United States v. Verdugo-Urquidez	494 U.S. 259	1990
Blystone v. Pennsylvania	494 U.S. 299	1990
Maryland v. Buie	494 U.S. 325	1990
Michigan v. Harvey	494 U.S. 344	1990
Boyde v. California	494 U.S. 370	1990
Butler v. McKellar	494 U.S. 407	1990
McKoy v. North Carolina	494 U.S. 433	1990
Lewis v. Cont'l Bank Corp.	494 U.S. 472	1990
Saffle v. Parks	494 U.S. 484	1990
Ferens v. John Deere Co.	494 U.S. 516	1990
Smith v. Ohio	494 U.S. 541	1990
Lytle v. Household Mfg., Inc.	494 U.S. 545	1990
Teamsters v. Terry	494 U.S. 558	1990
United States v. Dalm	494 U.S. 596	1990
Butterworth v. Smith	494 U.S. 624	1990
Adams Fruit Co. v. Barrett	494 U.S. 638	1990
Austin v. Chamber of Commerce	494 U.S. 652	1990
Dept. of Labor v. Triplett	494 U.S. 715	1990
Clemons v. Mississippi	494 U.S. 738	1990
NLRB v. Curtin Matheson Scientific, Inc.	494 U.S. 775	1990
Yellow Freight System, Inc. v. Donnelly	494 U.S. 820	1990
Kaiser Aluminum & Chem. Corp. v. Bonjorno	494 U.S. 827	1990
Dept. of Human Resources v. Smith	494 U.S. 872	1990
IRS v. FLRA	494 U.S. 922	1990
