= Swain v. Pressley =

- Supreme Court of the United States

Decided March 22, 1977
- Full case name: Swain v. Pressley
- Citations: 430 U.S. 372 (more)

Holding
- Congress's abrogation of standard habeas corpus procedure in the District of Columbia's local court system was not an unconstitutional suspension of the writ because the District had an adequate post-conviction alternative.

Court membership
- Chief Justice Warren E. Burger Associate Justices William J. Brennan Jr. · Potter Stewart; Byron White · Thurgood Marshall; Harry Blackmun · Lewis F. Powell Jr. William Rehnquist · John P. Stevens

Swain v. Pressley, 430 U.S. 372 (1977), was a United States Supreme Court case in which the court held that Congress's abrogation of standard habeas corpus procedure in the District of Columbia's local court system was not an unconstitutional suspension of the writ because the District had an adequate post-conviction alternative.

== Background ==
A suspension of the writ of habeas corpus violates Article I, Section 9, Clause 2 of the Constitution "unless when in Cases of Rebellion or Invasion the public Safety may require it" to be suspended.

Pressley, in-custody pursuant to a sentence imposed by the Superior Court of the District of Columbia, applied in the United States District Court for the District of Columbia for a writ of habeas corpus seeking a review of the constitutionality of the proceedings that led to his conviction and sentence. The District Court dismissed the application on the basis of D.C.Code Ann. § 23-110(g) (1973), which provides that an application for a writ of habeas corpus on behalf of an incarcerated person authorized to apply for collateral relief by motion in the Superior Court pursuant to the statute "shall not be entertained by the Superior Court or by any Federal or State court if it appears that the applicant has failed to make a motion for relief under this section or that the Superior Court has denied him relief...." That is, a habeas petition cannot be approved unless the claim received inadequate post-conviction reconsideration by the local court.

The United States Court of Appeals for the District of Columbia Circuit reversed. Doubting the constitutionality of the statutory curtailment of the District Court's jurisdiction to issue writs of habeas corpus, the court construed the statute as merely requiring the exhaustion of local remedies before a habeas corpus petition could be filed in the District Court and concluded that respondent had exhausted those remedies.

== Opinion of the court ==
The Supreme Court issued an opinion on March 22, 1977. The court approved of the District's adequate alternative.

== Later developments ==
Critics of Swain predicted that it might herald the end of federal habeas relief for state convictions because it implied that states could just create alternatives to it.
