= Jurisdictional strike =

Type of strike in United States labor law

In United States labor law, a jurisdictional strike is a concerted refusal to work undertaken by a union to assert its members' right to particular job assignments and to protest the assignment of disputed work to members of another union or to unorganized workers. (Labor unions use the term jurisdiction to refer to their claims to represent workers who perform a certain type of work and the right of their members to perform such work.) The Taft-Hartley amendments to the National Labor Relations Act empowered the National Labor Relations Board to resolve such jurisdictional disputes and authorized the General Counsel of the NLRB to seek an injunction barring such strikes.

Jurisdictional strikes occur most frequently in the United States in the construction industry. Construction unions frequently resolve those disputes through a privately created adjustment system.

In other countries, jurisdiction strikes are often called demarcation disputes.

== See also ==
- Jurisdiction
