= United States v. Verdugo-Urquidez =

- Supreme Court of the United States

Argued November 7, 1989 Decided February 28, 1990
- Full case name: United States v. Rene Martin Verdugo-Urquidez
- Citations: 494 U.S. 259 (more) 110 S. Ct. 1056; 108 L. Ed. 2d 222; 1990 U.S. LEXIS 1175; 58 U.S.L.W. 4263

Case history
- Prior: 856 F.2d 1214 (9th Cir. 1988); cert. granted, 490 U.S. 1019 (1989).

Holding
- The Fourth Amendment does not apply to the search and seizure by United States agents of property owned by a nonresident alien and located in a foreign country.

Court membership
- Chief Justice William Rehnquist Associate Justices William J. Brennan Jr. · Byron White; Thurgood Marshall · Harry Blackmun; John P. Stevens · Sandra Day O'Connor; Antonin Scalia · Anthony Kennedy

Case opinions
- Majority: Rehnquist, joined by White, O'Connor, Scalia, Kennedy
- Concurrence: Kennedy
- Concurrence: Stevens (in judgment)
- Dissent: Brennan, joined by Marshall
- Dissent: Blackmun

Laws applied
- U.S. Const. amend. IV

United States v. Verdugo-Urquidez, 494 U.S. 259 (1990), was a United States Supreme Court decision that determined that Fourth Amendment protections do not apply to searches and seizures by United States agents of property owned by a nonresident alien in a foreign country.

== Facts ==
Rene Martin Verdugo-Urquidez, a Mexican citizen reputed to be a drug-lord involved in the torture and murder of DEA agent Enrique Camarena Salazar, was arrested and brought to the United States. The DEA decided that it would be a good idea to search the defendant's home, so agents received authorization from the Mexican government to conduct the search. The agents found documents believed to be the defendant's records of his marijuana shipments.

When the government sought to introduce the documents as evidence in court, the defendant objected, asserting that they were obtained without a warrant, and therefore could not constitutionally be used at trial. The United States District Court agreed, and invoked the exclusionary rule to suppress the documents (i.e., to prevent them from being used as evidence). The government appealed this ruling, which was affirmed by the Court of Appeals for the Ninth Circuit. The government then appealed to the Supreme Court.

== Opinion of the Court ==
The Court held that the Fourth Amendment's prohibition against unreasonable searches and seizures did not apply where United States agents searched and seized property located in a foreign country owned by a nonresident alien in the United States. Chief Justice Rehnquist authored the opinion for the Court, joined by Justices White, Scalia, Kennedy and O'Connor, contending that "the people" intended to be protected by the Fourth Amendment were the people of the United States, and that the defendant's "legal but involuntary presence" on U.S. soil (a direct result of his arrest) failed to create a sufficient relationship with the U.S. to allow him to call upon the Constitution for protection.

=== Concurring opinions ===
Justice Kennedy authored a concurring opinion, contending that the application of the Fourth Amendment in cases such as this would interfere with the ability of the U.S. to engage in actions designed to protect the nation's interests abroad.

Justice Stevens also authored a concurring opinion, contending that the Fourth Amendment and its accompanying prohibition against unreasonable searches and seizures does apply in such cases, but concluding that this search and seizure was reasonable because it was done with the permission and assistance of the government of Mexico and because no U.S. court would have had the authority to issue a warrant for such a search.

=== Dissenting opinions ===
Justice Brennan dissented, joined by Justice Marshall, contending that the Fourth Amendment was indeed intended by the framers to apply to any action undertaken by the federal government. They contended that the Constitution grants the government limited powers, and the application of rights is one such limitation. Therefore, no agent of the federal government could ever conduct a search that was not governed by the Fourth Amendment.

Justice Blackmun also dissented, contending that when a foreign national is charged with a violation of U.S. criminal law, he is being treated as one of the governed.

== See also ==
- List of United States Supreme Court cases, volume 494
- List of United States Supreme Court cases
- Lists of United States Supreme Court cases by volume
- List of United States Supreme Court cases by the Rehnquist Court
- Rafael Caro Quintero
- Miguel Caro Quintero
