= Colgrove v. Battin =

- Supreme Court of the United States

Argued January 17, 1973 Decided June 21, 1973
- Full case name: Colgrove v. Battin
- Citations: 413 U.S. 149 (more) 93 S. Ct. 2448; 37 L. Ed. 2d 522; 1973 U.S. LEXIS 42; 17 Fed. R. Serv. 2d (Callaghan) 401

Holding
- A six-member jury for the trial of civil cases comports with the Seventh Amendment.

Court membership
- Chief Justice Warren E. Burger Associate Justices William O. Douglas · William J. Brennan Jr. Potter Stewart · Byron White; Thurgood Marshall · Harry Blackmun; Lewis F. Powell Jr. · William Rehnquist

Case opinions
- Majority: Brennan, joined by Burger, White, Blackmun, Rehnquist
- Dissent: Douglas, joined by Powell
- Dissent: Marshall, joined by Stewart
- Dissent: Powell

Colgrove v. Battin, 413 U.S. 149 (1973), was a United States Supreme Court case in which the Court ruled 5-4 that six person civil juries were constitutional.
