= Morgan v. United States =

Morgan v. United States is the name of a number of noted Supreme Court cases:

- Morgan v. United States (1871) (81 U.S. 531)
- Morgan v. United States (1885) (113 U.S. 476), a case involving payment of United States bonds known as "five-twenty bonds"
- Morgan v. United States (1936) (298 U.S. 468)
- Morgan v. United States (1938) (304 U.S. 1)

== See also ==
- United States v. Morgan (disambiguation)
