= Marsh v. Buck =

- Supreme Court of the United States

Argued April 29, 1941 Decided May 26, 1941
- Full case name: Marsh v. Buck
- Citations: 313 U.S. 406 (more) 61 S. Ct. 969; 85 L. Ed. 1426

Holding
- General statements that the law will be enforced if enacted are not threats against entities subject to the law.

Court membership
- Chief Justice Charles E. Hughes Associate Justices Harlan F. Stone · Owen Roberts; Hugo Black · Stanley F. Reed; Felix Frankfurter · William O. Douglas; Frank Murphy

Case opinion
- Majority: Black, joined by unanimous
- Murphy took no part in the consideration or decision of the case.

Marsh v. Buck, 313 U.S. 406 (1941), was a United States Supreme Court case in which the Court held General statements that the law will be enforced if enacted are not threats against entities subject to the law.
