= Kahn v. Shevin =

- Supreme Court of the United States

Decided April 24, 1974
- Full case name: Kahn v. Shevin
- Citations: 416 U.S. 351 (more)

Holding
- Granting widows a bonus property tax exemption not available to widowers does not violate the Equal Protection Clause because it has a "fair and substantial relation to the object of the legislation."

Court membership
- Chief Justice Warren E. Burger Associate Justices William O. Douglas · William J. Brennan Jr. Potter Stewart · Byron White; Thurgood Marshall · Harry Blackmun; Lewis F. Powell Jr. · William Rehnquist

Case opinions
- Majority: Douglas, joined by Burger, Stewart, Blackmun, Powell, Rehnquist
- Dissent: Brennan, joined by Marshall
- Dissent: White

Kahn v. Shevin, 416 U.S. 351 (1974), was a United States Supreme Court case in which the Court held that granting widows a bonus property tax exemption not available to widowers does not violate the Equal Protection Clause because it has a "fair and substantial relation to the object of the legislation." After holding a gender distinction that benefited men void in Reed v. Reed (1971), the Court was presented with cases like Kahn that dealt with gender distinctions that benefited women. The court in Kahn splintered over the question, but later held unanimously in Weinberger v. Wiesenfeld (1975) that a similar provision did violate the Equal Protection Clause.
