= Klaxon Co. v. Stentor Electric Manufacturing Co. =

Klaxon Co. v. Stentor Electric Manufacturing Co., Inc.
- Supreme Court of the United States

Argued May 1–2, 1941 Decided June 2, 1941
- Full case name: Klaxon Company v. Stentor Electric Manufacturing Company, Inc.
- Citations: 313 U.S. 487 (more) 61 S. Ct. 1020; 85 L. Ed. 1477; 1941 U.S. LEXIS 1298; 49 U.S.P.Q. (BNA) 515

Court membership
- Chief Justice Charles E. Hughes Associate Justices Harlan F. Stone · Owen Roberts; Hugo Black · Stanley F. Reed; Felix Frankfurter · William O. Douglas; Frank Murphy

Case opinion
- Majority: Reed, joined by unanimous

Klaxon Company v. Stentor Electric Manufacturing Company, 313 U.S. 487 (1941), was a United States Supreme Court case in which the Court applied the choice-of-law principles of Erie Railroad v. Tompkins to conflicts between laws of different states for cases sitting in federal court on diversity jurisdiction. The court held that a federal court sitting in diversity must apply the choice-of-law doctrine of the forum state to choose between the forum state's law and the other state's law (as distinguished from the federal choice-of-law doctrines which had been used before Erie).

== See also ==
- List of United States Supreme Court cases, volume 313
