= Lawsuits involving Dell Inc. =

Dell, a technology firm, has been involved in various lawsuits.

== Lawsuits ==
In 1997, Håkan Lans sued Dell for infringement of his color-graphics display patent, U.S. patent no. 4,303,986. Dell won the case because Lans did not have any ownership interest in the patent, having assigned it to a corporation that he owned.

In 2005, Dell began the construction of a facility in Winston-Salem, North Carolina. Many claims emerged that Dell had used unfair practices to obtain huge incentives. Dell Inc. fought a lawsuit which the court system later dismissed.

In October 2005, Dell filed a lawsuit in a Paris court to sue Minorca-based independent website-designer Paul Dell of "Dellimages" for engaging in "parasitism and unfair competition". This related to his company website "DellWebsites".

On January 31, 2007, some shareholders filed a lawsuit accusing Dell and Intel of conspiring, and accusing Dell executives (including Michael Dell) of backdating options and of propped financial reports. Specific allegations claimed that:

- Dell had received kickback from Intel to maintain Intel exclusivity
- Dell had used the funds to prop up its sales-figures
- Dell reduced the period and scope of its warranties and cut corners on manufacturing and testing in order to funnel additional funds to sales; causing the stock-price to inflate to around $40 per share
- once stock-prices had peaked, several Dell executives, including Michael Dell, sold massive amounts of their personal stock-holdings to benefit from the artificially inflated stock-price

On February 8, 2007, seven current and former workers at a call-center in Roseburg, Oregon sued the computer-maker, saying the company worked its sales reps "off the clock", failed to provide proper rest-breaks and improperly recorded their lunch-periods. Moves have begun to turn the case into a class action. Dell suddenly closed down the facility at Roseburg, Oregon on August 2, 2007. The facility had consisted of computer and electronics sales-agents and of customer-service representatives.

In March 2007 an article titled "Computer Giant Faces Consumer Lawsuit Consumers Allege They Didn't Get the Tech Support They Paid For" appeared on an ABC News website. "Part of the suit claims that though Dell gave the impression of an "award-winning service" available to consumers "24 hours a day, seven days a week", consumers faced "nightmarish obstacles" to get help and technical service for their computers. New York State Attorney General Andrew Cuomo said that New York had received 700 complaints about Dell — more than the number of complaints for any other related subject.

In May 2007, Andrew Cuomo filed a lawsuit against Dell for "false advertising and deceptive business practices, including offering misleading financing, and failing to honor rebates, warranties and service contracts". Dell spokesman Bob Pearson portrayed the lawsuit as based on only a small portion of Dell's customers and as in no way reflecting the way the company treats its customers. Dell's hardware-warranty contract says that customers must troubleshoot over the phone — including possibly opening the computer — before Dell will send a technical service provider to replace a part. On May 27, 2008, State Supreme Court Justice Joseph Teresi required Dell to clarify its financing and warranty criteria, saying the computer maker engaged in fraud, false advertising, deceptive business and abusive debt-collection practices. Parties have filed more than 1,000 additional complaints with the attorney general's office since the initial filing of the lawsuit in May 2007.

On December 5, 2007, Typhoon Touch Technologies filed a lawsuit naming Dell inc. along with other defendants, and alleging patent-violations over Dell's use of touchscreen technology.

On June 28, 2010, The New York Times described a civil case against Dell in Federal District Court in North Carolina, in which Dell shipped at least 11.8 million computers from May 2003 to July 2005 that were at risk of failing because of faulty capacitors made by the Japanese manufacturer Nichicon. The suit alleges that these faulty components in Dell's OptiPlex desktop computers, were known by Dell to cause problems or computer failure up to 97 percent of the time over a three-year period, and yet it is alleged that Dell knowingly concealed these component problems from customers.

On February 18, 2019, Cicilia Gilbert, a transgender employee, filed suit in New York federal court for discriminatory termination. Dell invoked an arbitration clause, and the case was sent to binding arbitration. On March 4, 2022, the Arbitrator ruled that Dell had terminated the employee because of gender identity and disability.

On June 18, 2020, Merkamerica Inc filed a 9.6 million dollar suit against Dell Marketing on behalf of Dell Outlet. The claim is that Dell Outlet issued secret rebates to one of its resellers, harming competition.
