= Meyer v. Astrue =

- Court: United States Court of Appeals for the Fourth Circuit
- Full case name: Maurice E. Meyer, III v. Michael J. Astrue, Commissioner of the Social Security Administration
- Argued: October 27, 2011
- Decided: December 2, 2011
- Citation: 662 F.3d 700

Court membership
- Judges sitting: Diana Gribbon Motz, Robert Bruce King, Allyson Kay Duncan

Case opinions
- Majority: Motz, joined by King, Duncan

Meyer v. Astrue, 662 F.3d 700 (4th Cir. 2011), was a landmark Social Security Disability Insurance case argued in federal court, resolving a conflict within the circuit over the summary denial of requests for review when new evidence is submitted to the Appeals Council.

After suffering severe injuries in an accidental fall, Maurice Eugene Meyer applied for Social Security Disability insurance benefits. An administrative law judge (ALJ) denied his claim, noting that Meyer failed to provide an opinion from his treating physician. When Meyer requested review of his claim by the Appeals Council, he submitted a letter from his treating physician detailing the injuries and recommending significant restrictions on Meyer's activity. The Appeals Council made this letter part of the record but summarily denied Meyer's request for review; thus, the ALJ's decision denying benefits became the final decision of the Commissioner of the Social Security Administration. Meyer appealed, on the grounds that the Appeals Council did wrong in failing to articulate specific findings justifying its denial of his request for review. The court rejected this argument and ruled that the Appeals Council did not have to explain its reasoning when denying review of an ALJ decision, but because in this case the court could not determine if substantial evidence supported the denial of benefits, the court reversed and remanded.

== Background ==
In December 2004, Meyer fell 25 feet out of a deer stand while hunting and suffered significant injuries. He fractured three lumbar vertebrae, which required reconstructive surgery. He also fractured his left wrist and injured his left shoulder, requiring additional surgery. At the time of his fall, Meyer was 51 years old and owned and operated a rural feed store.

On December 13, 2004, Dr. Byron Bailey, an attending neurosurgeon at the Medical University of South Carolina in Charleston, performed Meyer's back surgery. On December 26, Dr. Bailey discharged Meyer from the hospital, and referred him for physical and occupational therapy. Dr. Bailey observed Meyer in clinic for post-surgical follow-up through the spring of 2005, and reviewed Meyer's post-operative progress through at least April 2006.

Following his surgery, Meyer underwent extensive physical therapy at the Rehabilitation Centers of Charleston, averaging between five and 10 visits per month until his discharge in June 2006. At that time, Dr. Bailey referred Meyer to the hospital's pain management clinic. Dr. Arthur R. Smith, an anesthesiologist, treated Meyer in clinic with various injections that provided Meyer "short-term relief" from his pain. In August 2007, however, Dr. Smith ceased the injections, acknowledging that they failed to provide Meyer with any "long-term benefit."

On July 13, 2005, Meyer filed a claim for disability insurance benefits with the Social Security Administration.

== Meyer’s Appeal Process ==
After both his initial claim and request for reconsideration were denied, Meyer requested a hearing. The ALJ heard Meyer's claim and issued an unfavorable decision on June 5, 2008. In his opinion, the ALJ followed the federal regulations governing administrative review of Social Security Disability claims, proceeding through the customary five-step sequential analysis.

Applying the first three steps, the ALJ determined that Meyer (1) had not engaged in "substantial gainful activity" since the date of his accident, (2) had the "severe impairments" of degenerative disc disease and a history of left wrist injury, but (3) did not have an impairment "that meets or medically equals" an impairment that the federal regulations define as disabling.

As the regulations instruct, the ALJ evaluated Meyer's "residual functional capacity" before proceeding to step four. The ALJ concluded that Meyer could perform "the full range" of "light work," which involves "lifting no more than 20 pounds at a time with frequent lifting or carrying of objects weighing up to 10 pounds," and "a good deal of walking or standing, or . . . sitting most of the time with some pushing and pulling of arm or leg controls." In reaching these conclusions, the ALJ found Meyer's assertion that "he suffered from constant, unrelenting" pain not entirely "credible" because it was "inconsistent with the medical evidence of record," including Meyer's "reports to his physicians, and the treatment sought and received."

The ALJ relied on evidence that between August 2005 and June 2006, Meyer reported improvements in his condition, decreased pain, and less use of pain medication, and clinical observations that during this time Meyer was "in no apparent distress" and appeared "generally healthy." The ALJ also cited a June 2006 one-page physical therapy discharge form noting that Meyer "was able to perform his activities of daily living independently; had no work/recreational restrictions; and could ambulate independently."

Further, the ALJ considered Meyer's testimony that he was able to drive and assist his wife in caring for their horses and dog, and evidence suggesting that Meyer continued, although to a lesser degree, to ride horseback and operate his tractor. The ALJ emphasized that "[g]iven the claimant’s allegations of totally disabling symptoms, one might expect to see some indication in the treatment records of restrictions placed on the claimant by a treating physician," yet a "review of the records . . . reveals no [such] restrictions."

Meyer had asserted before the ALJ that although he sought opinions from Dr. Bailey and Dr. Smith, his treating physicians, it was their policy not to provide such opinion evidence in these types of proceedings. Meyer did submit the findings of Dr. Barry Weissglass, who, at Meyer's request, performed an independent occupational evaluation of Meyer in November 2007. Dr. Weissglass opined that Meyer was incapable of performing the functions of light work and recommended restrictions on his activities that were consistent with that finding, including that Meyer not lift more than 10 pounds and refrain from extended sitting or standing.

However, the ALJ accorded Dr. Weissglass's opinion "only minimal evidentiary weight as it is inconsistent with the other evidence of record," i.e., that detailed above. Proceeding to step four of the analysis, the ALJ concluded that Meyer was unable to perform his past relevant work of operating a rural feed store or being a marine machinist.

At the fifth and final step, the ALJ considered Meyer's residual functional capacity for light work, his age of 51 years, and his "limited education," and, based on the Medical-Vocational Guidelines, which take administrative notice of the availability of job types in the national economy, concluded that Meyer was not disabled. After issuance of the ALJ decision on June 5, 2008, Meyer timely sought review by the Appeals Council.

With his request for review, Meyer submitted new evidence not before the ALJ, including an opinion letter from his treating physician, Dr. Bailey, dated August 18, 2008. In the letter, Dr. Bailey described Meyer's back injury and surgery and explained that Meyer's "post-operative course has been complicated by chronic, debilitating back pain which was anticipated due to the magnitude of his injury." Dr. Bailey opined that Meyer's "long term restrictions include no lifting greater than 10 pounds, avoid bending, stooping, squatting, and no sitting, standing or walking for more than 30 minutes without rest periods." He explained that Meyer "will continue to require frequent follow-up and medical management" and "will [likely] require further surgical intervention in the future." At the close of his letter, Dr. Bailey noted his "agreement with the majority of [Dr. Weissglass’s] findings." On October 24, 2008, the Appeals Council denied Meyer's request for review. In doing so, the Appeals Council noted that it made Dr. Bailey's letter a part of the record. But in the Notice of Appeals Council Action, the Appeals Council "found that this information does not provide a basis for changing the [ALJ]’s decision" and so "the [ALJ]’s decision is the final decision of the Commissioner of Social Security in [Meyer’s] case." Meyer then filed this action.

A magistrate judge recommended affirmance of the Commissioner's decision, concluding, inter alia, that Dr. Bailey's letter should be accorded only minimal weight because he was not one of Meyer's treating physicians. Meyer objected to the magistrate's recommendation but the district court entered a final order affirming the Commissioner's decision. Meyer timely noted this appeal. As the Appeals Council properly informed Meyer, because it denied review, the decision of the ALJ became "the final decision of the [Commissioner]." We uphold the factual findings underpinning the Commissioner's final decision "if they are supported by substantial evidence and were reached through application of the correct legal standard." In making this determination, we "review the record as a whole" including any new evidence that the Appeals Council "specifically incorporated. In the end, Judge Dana L. Christensen of the United States District Court, D. Montana, Missoula Division agreed with Judge Lynch and upheld the magistrate's decision and denied Meyer's claim.
