= United States v. Morgan (1941) =

- Supreme Court of the United States

Argued April 10, 1941 Decided May 26, 1941
- Full case name: United States v. Morgan, Administratrix, et al.
- Citations: 313 U.S. 409 (more) 61 S. Ct. 999; 85 L. Ed. 1429

Holding
- The Secretary of Agriculture properly determined the reasonable rates for services rendered by market agencies, and his strong views on the topic prior to hearings did not unfit him for exercising that duty. (reversing the decision of the District Court of the United States for the Western District of Missouri)

Court membership
- Chief Justice Charles E. Hughes Associate Justices Harlan F. Stone · Owen Roberts; Hugo Black · Stanley F. Reed; Felix Frankfurter · William O. Douglas; Frank Murphy

Case opinions
- Majority: Frankfurter, joined by Hughes, Stone, Black, Douglas, Murphy
- Dissent: Roberts
- Reed, McReynolds took no part in the consideration or decision of the case.

United States v. Morgan, 313 U.S. 409 (1941), is the fourth and final decision by the United States Supreme Court in a long battle between the Secretary of Agriculture and market agencies on the reasonable rates to be rendered for services. The Court held that, under the Packers and Stockyards Act, the Secretary of Agriculture had the authority and he properly determined the reasonable rates for services rendered by market agencies.

== Background ==
The Packers and Stockyards Act provides the Secretary of Agriculture the authority to set rates to be paid by agencies for services rendered. Under the Act, however, two conditions are put upon the exercise of this power: (1) The Secretary must be of the opinion that the existing rate is unjust, and (2) this opinion must be the result of a full hearing.

In the early 1930s the Secretary of Agriculture became concerned that the Fred O. Morgan Sheep Commission Company and other agencies doing business at the Kansas City Stockyards were charging unreasonable rates for services rendered. The Secretary of Agriculture at that time was Arthur M. Hyde, who, in lieu of an open hearing, had taken testimonies from the agencies. In March 1933, Henry A. Wallace became the new Secretary of Agriculture as Franklin D. Roosevelt took office as the 32nd United States President. Three months after assuming office, Wallace issued an order setting maximum rates to be charged by market agencies for their services at the Kansas City Stockyards. Morgan and the other agencies then brought suit to void that maximum rate because they had not been provided a proper hearing on the matter. The United States District Court for the Western District of Missouri agreed with the Secretary of Agriculture, and the agencies appealed to the Supreme Court.

=== Morgan v. United States 298 U.S. 468 (1936) ===
In 1936, the Supreme Court ruled in favor of the agencies and reversed the District Court by setting aside the maximum rate that had been determined by the Secretary. The Court required the Secretary of Agriculture to provide evidence that he had adequately provided an appropriate hearing to the agencies. The matter returned to the District Court where the Secretary of Agriculture would provide evidence that he had made his determination on the maximum rate after reading the transcripts of the hearings provided by his predecessor. The District Court agreed with the Secretary of Agriculture, and so the agencies again appealed to the Supreme Court because Wallace had not presided over the hearings himself.

=== Morgan v. United States 304 U.S. 1 (1938) ===
For the Second time, the Supreme Court heard the case between the agencies and the Secretary of Agriculture. In 1938, the Court would side in favor with the agencies for the second time and reversed the District Court for the second time. The Court determined that reading the testimonies of a prior hearing did not provide the agencies a full hearing by the Secretary of Agriculture as required by the Packers and Stockyards Act. The Court held the hearing to be fatally defective and the order of the Secretary invalid. This decision stands for the important rule of administrative law that "he who decides must hear."

=== United States v. Morgan 307 U.S. 183 (1939) ===
In 1939, the Supreme Court heard the third case between the agencies and the Secretary of Agriculture. This case involved the return of payments made between 1933 and 1937 in excess of a reasonable rate properly determined, and agreed by both parties, in 1937. The Secretary of Agriculture wanted to hold a new hearing to determine whether the excess payments were reasonable; while the agencies demanded return of the excess. Unlike the previous two cases, the District Court agreed with the agencies and determined that the Secretary of Agriculture must return the excess payments to the agencies. For the third time, the Supreme Court reversed the decision of the District Court. It determined that the excess should be held pending a new hearing to determine the reasonable rate that should have been charged between 1933 and 1937.

=== United States v. Morgan 313 U.S. 409 (1941) ===
In June 1938, the Secretary of Agriculture directed that the proceeding be reopened to determine the reasonable rate that should have been set retroactively between 1933 and 1937. After an appropriate hearing and consideration, it was determined that the rate set in 1933 was reasonable. The agencies again brought suit. This time the agencies charged the Secretary of Agriculture with making a decision that was not supported by the evidence and that the Secretary of Agriculture was biased against a fair ruling. The agencies introduced into evidence a letter Wallace wrote to the New York Times following the Court's 1938 decision stating his extreme disappointment that opinion. The agencies also sued for the right to dispose and question the Secretary of Agriculture. After siding with the Secretary of Agriculture in the first two cases, the District Court sided with the agencies for the second consecutive time. The Secretary of Agriculture would then appeal to the Supreme Court.

== Decision ==
In 1941, the Supreme Court heard its fourth cases between Henry A. Wallace, the Secretary of Agriculture, and Fred O. Morgan Sheep Commission Company with other agencies doing business at the Kansas City Stockyards. The Court determined that the Wallace had properly heard evidence and made determinations on the reasonable rates agencies should have been charged for their services between 1933 and 1937. The Court also determined that the expressed strong views by Wallace in his letter to the New York Times did not unfit him for exercising his duty in the subsequent proceedings. Finally, the Court held that the Secretary of Agriculture, as a high-ranking official, should not be called upon to question and defend the basis for his decision. Thus the Court ruled in favor of the Secretary of Agriculture and determined that the agencies could not recover payments made to the government between 1933 and 1937. The District Court decision was then reversed.

This was the last case between the Secretary of Agriculture and the agencies. In their four appearances before the Court, each side had prevailed twice. The Court sided with the agencies with their 1936 and 1938 decisions and sided with the Secretary of Agriculture in the 1939 and 1941 decisions. However, the United States District Court for the Western District of Missouri decisions did not prevail in any Morgan case as the Supreme Court reversed the lower court in all four decisions.

== Morgan Doctrine ==
The 1941 Morgan decision has been classified as a landmark decision by federal courts and the decision is the foundation for the Morgan Doctrine which strongly cautions against the taking of depositions from high-ranking government officials. In 1941, the Court recognized the importance of protecting the decision-making process of such officials and feared the effects of interrogations and analogized the high-ranking government official to a judge; "[j]ust as a judge cannot be subjected to such scrutiny, so the integrity of the administrative process must be equally respected.
