= Califano v. Goldfarb =

- Supreme Court of the United States

Argued October 5, 1976 Decided March 2, 1977
- Full case name: Joseph A. Califano, Jr., Secretary of Health, Education, and Welfare v. Leon Goldfarb
- Citations: 430 U.S. 199 (more) 97 S. Ct. 1021; 51 L. Ed. 2d 270; 1977 U.S. LEXIS 53

Case history
- Prior: Goldfarb v. Sec'y of Health, Ed. & Welfare, 396 F. Supp. 308 (E.D.N.Y. 1975); probable jurisdiction noted, 424 U.S. 906 (1976).

Holding
- The gender-based distinction created by 42 U.S.C. § 402(f)(1)(D) violates the Due Process Clause of the Fifth Amendment.

Court membership
- Chief Justice Warren E. Burger Associate Justices William J. Brennan Jr. · Potter Stewart; Byron White · Thurgood Marshall; Harry Blackmun · Lewis F. Powell Jr. William Rehnquist · John P. Stevens

Case opinions
- Plurality: Brennan, joined by White, Marshall, Powell
- Concurrence: Stevens
- Dissent: Rehnquist, joined by Burger, Stewart, Blackmun

Califano v. Goldfarb, 430 U.S. 199 (1977), was a decision by the United States Supreme Court, which held that the different treatment of men and women mandated by 42 U.S.C. § 402(f)(1)(D) constituted invidious discrimination against female wage earners by affording them less protection for their surviving spouses than is provided to male employees, and therefore violated the Due Process Clause of the Fifth Amendment to the United States Constitution. The case was brought by a widower who was denied survivor benefits on the grounds that he had not been receiving at least one-half support from his wife when she died. Justice Brennan delivered the opinion of the court, ruling unconstitutional the provision of the Social Security Act which set forth a gender-based distinction between widows and widowers, whereby Social Security Act survivors benefits were payable to a widower only if he was receiving at least half of his support from his late wife, while such benefits based on the earnings of a deceased husband were payable to his widow regardless of dependency. The Court found that this distinction deprived female wage earners of the same protection that a similarly situated male worker would have received, violating due process and equal protection.

== Background ==
Leon Goldfarb, a widower in the state of New York, applied for survivor benefits under the Social Security Act. Leon Goldfarb's late wife had worked as a secretary for New York City public schools for nearly twenty-five years and paid all of her social security taxes until her death in 1968. Upon his wife's death, Leon Goldfarb applied for survivor benefits but was denied. The relevant statute, 42 U.S.C § 402(f)(1)(D), mandated that surviving widowers must meet the burden of proving that they had been receiving over half of their financial support from their wives. The law made no such requirement for widows, who would be provided survivor benefits regardless of their dependency on their husbands.

Goldfarb challenged the constitutionality of the statute in the United States District Court for the Eastern District of New York. He was represented by Nadine H. Taub, Rutgers Law School professor and attorney at the Women's Rights Litigation Clinic of Rutgers Law School-Newark and the American Civil Liberties Union Foundation. The lower court ruled in Goldfarb's favor, holding that the provision of the Social Security Act that denied benefits to widowers was unconstitutional as discriminating against widowers on the basis of sex. The Secretary of Health, Education, and Welfare appealed the decision to the Supreme Court.

Goldfarb was represented by future Supreme Court justice Ruth Bader Ginsburg, who at the time was co-founder and general counsel of the Women's Rights Project at the American Civil Liberties Union. This case was one of several gender discrimination cases that Ginsburg successfully argued in front of the Supreme Court between 1973 and 1976. Similar to her arguments in Frontiero v. Richardson, Ginsburg argued in her brief that a reliance on gender stereotypes which served to devalue women's roles as breadwinners constituted gender-based discrimination in violation of equal protection. She argued that the social security statute in question "assume[d] gainful employment as a domain in which men come first, women second," and that the statute favored "one type of marital unit over another."

== Court Decision ==
In a 5–4 decision, the Supreme Court upheld the decision of the District Court. Justice Brennan's opinion, which was joined by Justice White, Justice Marshall, and Justice Powell, determined that the gender-based distinction violates the Due Process Clause of the Fifth Amendment. The Court agreed with Ginsburg's arguments, noting that the distinction in the federal requirements "deprive[s] women of protection for their families which men receive as a result of their employment." The Court based its decision on the precedent established in prior cases Frontiero and Weinberger v. Wiesenfeld:

Weinberger v. Wiesenfeld, like the instant case, presented the question in the context of the [Old-Age, Survivors and Disability Insurance] program. There the Court held unconstitutional a provision that denied father's insurance benefits to surviving widowers with children in their care, while authorizing similar mother's benefits to similarly situated widows... Precisely the same reasoning condemns the gender-based distinction made by § 402(f)(1)(D) in this case. For that distinction, too, operates ‘to deprive women of protection for their families which men receive as a result of their employment’: social security taxes were deducted from Hannah Goldfarb's salary during the quarter century she worked as a secretary, yet, in consequence of § 402(f)(1)(D), she also ‘not only failed to receive for her (spouse) the same protection which similarly situated male worker would have received (for his spouse) but she also was deprived of a portion of her own earnings in order to contribute to the fund out of which benefits would be paid to others.’

The Court rejected the government's argument that the Court should focus solely on the distinction drawn between widowers and widows, based on the notion that the statute discriminates not against the covered wage earning female, but rather against her surviving widower, who was burdened with proof of dependency. The Court disagreed, stating that Mrs. Goldfarb "worked and paid social security taxes... at the same rate as her male colleagues" yet received narrower insurance protection than a male colleague. The Court found that this distinction requires the equal protection challenge in the case to focus on the gender-based discrimination against women and not only the distinction between widowers and widows.

Based on an examination of the legislative history of the statute, the Court found that there existed "an intention to aid the dependent spouses of deceased wage earners, coupled with a presumption that wives are usually dependent" in the statute. Rejecting the "archaic and overbroad" generalizations that a wife is more likely to be dependent on her husband than a husband on his wife, the Court concluded that these presumptions cannot justify a gender-based discrimination when distributing employment-related benefits.

=== Justice Stevens’ concurrence ===
Justice Stevens wrote in concurrence with the majority. Rejecting that the rationale behind the statutory scheme was justifiably based on administrative convenience or based on a 'policy of cushioning the financial impact of spousal loss upon the sex for which that loss imposes a disproportionately heavy burden,' he concurs with the Court's judgment as to the lack of justification for the disparate treatment of genders, but is "persuaded that the relevant discrimination in this case is against surviving male spouses, rather than against deceased female wage earners."

=== Justice Rehnquist's Dissent ===
In his dissent, which was joined by Chief Justice Burger, Justice Stewart and Justice Blackmun, Rehnquist disagreed that the classification was discriminatory. Rehnquist argued that Congress' purpose in adopting these provisions for dependency was "to avoid the burden and expense of specific case-by-case determination in the large number of cases where dependency is objectively probable." Because of the likelihood that a widow would be dependent on her husband, and not the other way around, Rehnquist argued that such a justifiably rational basis is permissible under the Fifth Amendment for the purpose of aiding administrative functions.

== Implications ==
This ruling required an amendment to the Social Security Act in order to eliminate the burden of proof for widowers. The new language provided equal protection for both genders. The Congress swiftly enacted such an amendment in 1977, while restricting benefits for claimants (like Goldfarb) who got a pension based on noncovered employment, though it subsequently modified the pension offset and delayed actual implementation until 1983.

== See also ==
- Gender equality
- List of gender equality lawsuits
- List of United States Supreme Court cases, volume 430
- Ruth Bader Ginsburg
- Weinberger v. Wiesenfeld (1975)
