= Garner v. Teamsters Local 776 =

- Supreme Court of the United States

Argued October 20–21, 1953 Decided December 14, 1953
- Full case name: Garner v. Teamsters Local 776
- Citations: 346 U.S. 485 (more) 74 S. Ct. 161; 98 L. Ed. 228

Case history
- Prior: 373 Pa. 19, 94 A.2d 893 (1953)

Court membership
- Chief Justice Earl Warren Associate Justices Hugo Black · Stanley F. Reed; Felix Frankfurter · William O. Douglas; Robert H. Jackson · Harold H. Burton; Tom C. Clark · Sherman Minton

Case opinion
- Majority: Jackson, joined by unanimous

Garner v. Teamsters Local 776, 346 U.S. 485 (1953), is a US labor law case, concerning the scope of federal preemption against state law for labor rights.

== Facts ==
Garner claimed that a dispute over picketing was not governed by federal law in the National Labor Relations Act of 1935, but by state law. Garner ran a trucking business with 24 employees, four members of the Teamsters Union. The union placed rotating pickets, of people who did not work for the business, at the platform for loading onto trucks, holding signs saying "Local 776 Teamsters Union (A.F. of L.) wants Employees of Central Storage & Transfer Co. to join them to gain union wages, hours and working conditions." Drivers and other carriers refused to cross the picket, and the business fell by 95%. A Pennsylvania court found this violated the Pennsylvania Labor Relations Act and the Supreme Court of Pennsylvania decided that the issue fell within the NLRB's jurisdiction to prevent unfair labor practices.

== Judgment ==
Jackson J decided the Pennsylvania statute was preempted from providing superior remedies or processing claims quicker than the NLRB because "the Board was vested with power to entertain petitioners’ grievance, to issue its own complaint" and apparent "Congress evidently considered that centralized administration of specially designed procedures was necessary to obtain uniform application of its substantive rules".

Congress has taken in hand this particular type of controversy where it affects interstate commerce. In language almost identical to parts of the Pennsylvania statute, it has forbidden labor unions to exert certain types of coercion on employees through the medium of the employer. It is not necessary or appropriate for us to surmise how the National Labor Relations Board might have decided this controversy had petitioners presented it to that body. The power and duty of primary decision lies with the Board, not with us. But it is clear that the Board was vested with power to entertain petitioners' grievance, to issue its own complaint against respondents and, pending final hearing, to seek from the United States District Court an injunction to prevent irreparable injury to petitioners while their case was being considered. The question then is whether the State, through its courts, may adjudge the same controversy and extend its own form of relief.

Congress did not merely lay down a substantive rule of law to be enforced by any tribunal competent to apply law generally to the parties. It went on to confide primary interpretation and application of its rules to a specific and specially constituted tribunal and prescribed a particular procedure for investigation, complaint and notice, and hearing and decision, including judicial relief pending a final administrative order. Congress evidently considered that centralized administration of specially designed procedures was necessary to obtain uniform application of its substantive rules and to avoid these diversities and conflicts likely to result from a variety of local procedures and attitudes toward labor controversies. Indeed, Pennsylvania passed a statute the same year as its labor relations Act reciting abuses of the injunction in labor litigations attributable more to procedure and usage than to substantive rules. A multiplicity of tribunals and a diversity of procedures are quite as apt to produce incompatible or conflicting adjudications as are different rules of substantive law. The same reasoning which prohibits federal courts from intervening in such cases, except by way of review or on application of the federal Board, precludes state courts from doing so. Cf. Myers v. Bethlehem Shipbuilding Corp., 303 U.S. 41, 58 S.Ct. 459, 82 L.Ed. 638; Amalgamated Utility Workers v. Consolidated Edison Co. of New York, 309 U.S. 261, 60 S.Ct. 561, 84 L.Ed. 738. And the reasons for excluding state administrative bodies from assuming control of matters expressly placed within the competence of the federal Board also exclude state courts from like action. Cf. Bethlehem Steel Co. v. New York State Labor Relations Board, 330 U.S. 767, 67 S.Ct. 1026, 91 L.Ed. 1234.

This case would warrant little further discussion except for a persuasively presented argument that the National Labor Relations Board enforces only a public right on behalf of the public interest, while state equity powers are invoked by a private party to protect a private right. The public right, it is said, is so distinct and dissimilar from the private right that federal occupancy of one field does not debar a state from continuing to exercise its conventional equity powers over the other. Support for this view is accumulated from the Act itself, its legislative history, some judicial expression, and professional commentary.

== See also ==
- United States labor law
