= Seventh Amendment to the United States Constitution =

1791 amendment regarding right to a jury trial

The Seventh Amendment (Amendment VII) to the United States Constitution is part of the Bill of Rights. This amendment enumerates the right to a jury trial in certain civil cases and inhibits courts from overturning a jury's findings of fact.

An early version of the Seventh Amendment was introduced in Congress in 1789 by James Madison, along with the other amendments, in response to Anti-Federalist objections to the new Constitution. Congress proposed a revised version of the Seventh Amendment to the states on September 28, 1789, and by December 15, 1791, the necessary three-quarters of the states had ratified it.

The Seventh Amendment is generally considered one of the more straightforward amendments of the Bill of Rights. While the Seventh Amendment's provision for jury trials in civil cases has never been incorporated (applied to the states), almost every state has a provision for jury trials in civil cases in its constitution. The prohibition of overturning a jury's findings of fact applies to federal cases, state cases involving federal law, and to review of state cases by federal courts. United States v. Wonson (1812) established the historical test, which interpreted the amendment as relying on English common law to determine whether a jury trial was necessary in a civil suit. The amendment thus does not guarantee trial by jury in cases under maritime law, in lawsuits against the government itself, and for many parts of patent claims. In all other cases, the jury can be waived by consent of the parties.

The amendment additionally guarantees a minimum of six members for a jury in a civil trial. The amendment's twenty-dollar threshold has not been the subject of much scholarly or judicial writing and still remains applicable despite the inflation that has occurred since the late 18th century ($20 in 1791 is equivalent to $510 in 2025; $20 in 1800 was convertible to a Troy ounce of gold).

== Text ==
In Suits at common law, where the value in controversy shall exceed twenty dollars, the right of trial by jury shall be preserved, and no fact tried by a jury, shall be otherwise re-examined in any Court of the United States, than according to the rules of the common law.

The Bill of Rights in the National Archives

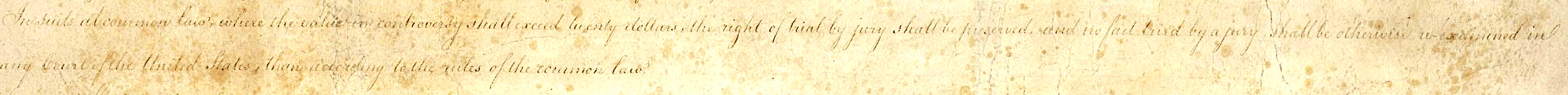
The hand-written copy of the proposed Bill of Rights, 1789, cropped to just show the text later ratified as the Seventh Amendment

== Background ==
After several years of comparatively weak government under the Articles of Confederation, a Constitutional Convention in Philadelphia proposed a new constitution on September 17, 1787, featuring a stronger chief executive and other changes. George Mason, a Constitutional Convention delegate and the drafter of Virginia's Declaration of Rights, proposed that a bill of rights listing and guaranteeing civil liberties be included. Other delegates—including future Bill of Rights drafter James Madison—disagreed, arguing that existing state guarantees of civil liberties were sufficient and any attempt to enumerate individual rights risked implying the federal government had power to violate every other right (this concern eventually led to the Ninth and Tenth Amendments). After a brief debate, Mason's proposal was defeated by a unanimous vote of the state delegations. In the final days of the convention, North Carolina delegate Hugh Williamson proposed a guarantee of trial by jury in federal civil cases, but a motion to add this guarantee was also defeated.

However, adoption of the Constitution required that nine of the thirteen states ratify it in state conventions. Opposition to ratification ("Anti-Federalism") was partly based on the Constitution's lack of adequate guarantees for civil liberties. Supporters of the Constitution in states where popular sentiment was against ratification (including Virginia, Massachusetts, and New York) successfully proposed that their state conventions both ratify the Constitution and call for the addition of a bill of rights.

One charge of the Anti-Federalists was that giving the U.S. Supreme Court jurisdiction "both as to law and fact" would allow it to deny the findings of jury trials in civil cases. Responding to these concerns, five state ratification conventions recommended a constitutional amendment guaranteeing the right to jury trial in civil cases.

== Proposal and ratification ==
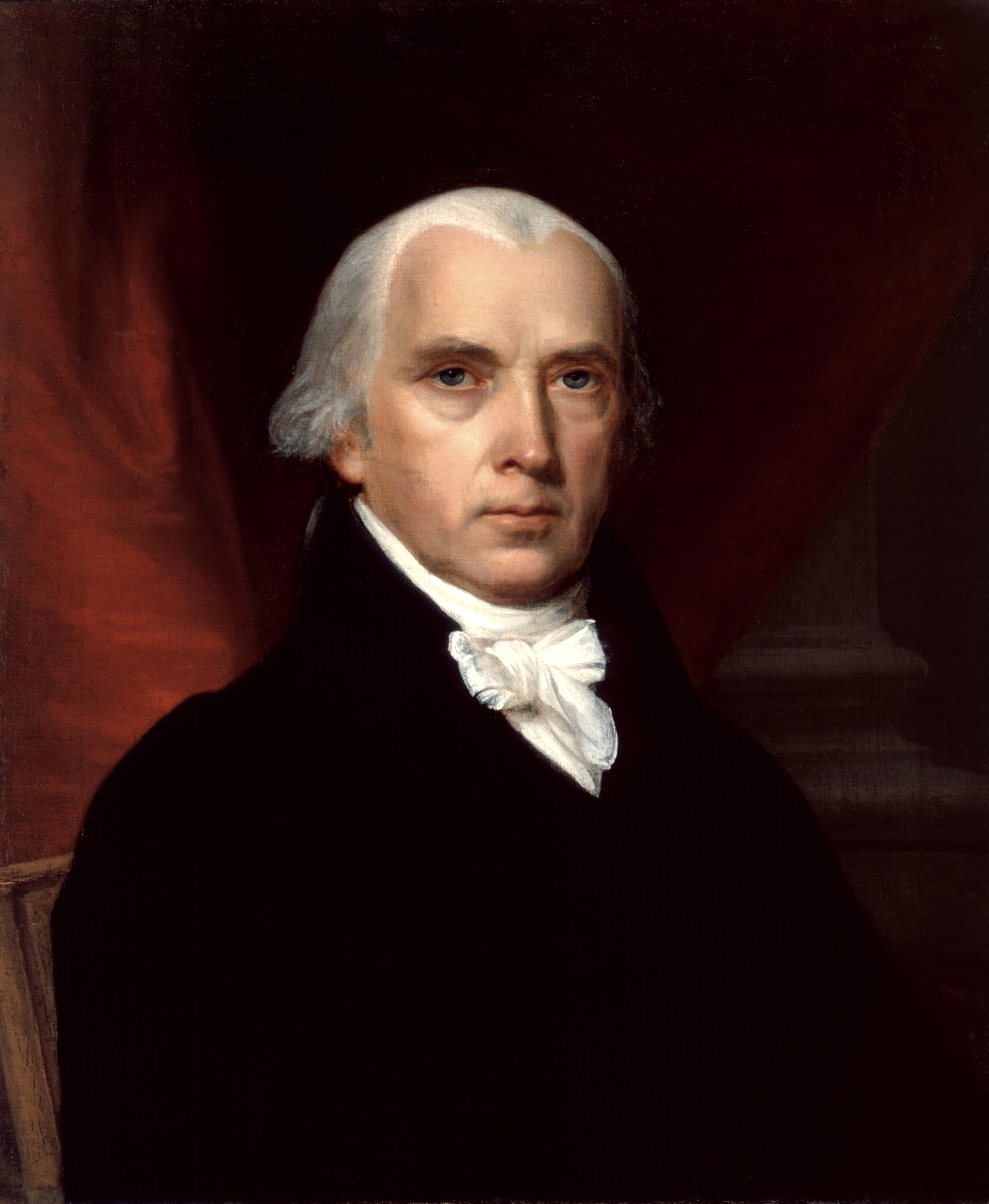
James Madison, drafter of the Bill of Rights

In the 1st United States Congress, following the state legislatures' request, James Madison proposed twenty constitutional amendments based on state bills of rights and English sources such as the Bill of Rights 1689. Among them was an amendment protecting findings of fact in civil cases exceeding a certain dollar value from judicial review. Madison proposed that this amendment should be added directly to Article III, though Congress later determined to add the proposed Bill of Rights to the end of the Constitution, leaving the original text intact. Congress also reduced Madison's proposed twenty amendments to twelve, and these were proposed to the states for ratification on September 25, 1789.

By the time the Bill of Rights was submitted to the states for ratification, opinions had shifted in both parties. Many Federalists, who had previously opposed a Bill of Rights, now supported the Bill as a means of silencing the Anti-Federalists' most effective criticism. Many Anti-Federalists, in contrast, now opposed it, realizing the Bill's adoption would greatly lessen the chances of a second constitutional convention, which they desired. Anti-Federalists such as Richard Henry Lee also argued that the Bill left the most objectionable portions of the Constitution, such as the federal judiciary and direct taxation, intact.

On November 20, 1788, New Jersey ratified eleven of the twelve amendments, rejecting an amendment to regulate congressional pay raises. On December 19 and 22, respectively, Maryland and North Carolina ratified all twelve amendments. On January 19, 25, and 28, 1790, respectively, South Carolina, New Hampshire, and Delaware ratified the Bill, though New Hampshire rejected the amendment on Congressional pay raises, and Delaware rejected the Congressional Apportionment Amendment. This brought the total of ratifying states to six of the required ten, but the process stalled in other states: Connecticut and Georgia found a Bill of Rights unnecessary and so refused to ratify, while Massachusetts ratified most of the amendments, but failed to send official notice to the Secretary of State that it had done so. (Note: All three states later ratified the Bill of Rights for sesquicentennial celebrations in 1939.)

In February through June 1790, New York, Pennsylvania, and Rhode Island ratified eleven of the amendments, though all three rejected the amendment on Congressional pay raises. Virginia initially postponed its debate, but after Vermont was admitted to the Union in 1791, the total number of states needed for ratification rose to eleven. Vermont ratified on November 3, 1791, approving all twelve amendments, and Virginia finally followed on December 15, 1791. Secretary of State Thomas Jefferson announced the adoption of the ten successfully ratified amendments on March 1, 1792.

== Judicial interpretation ==
The Seventh Amendment encompasses two clauses. The Preservation Clause ("In Suits at common law, where the value in controversy shall exceed twenty dollars, the right of trial by jury shall be preserved") sets out the types of cases juries are required to decide, while the Re-examination Clause ("[N]o fact tried by a jury, shall be otherwise re-examined in any Court of the United States, than according to the rules of the common law") prevents federal judges from overturning jury verdicts in certain ways. The Legal Information Institute stated with respect to the Preservation Clause: "Sir William Blackstone, in his influential treatise on English common law, called the right 'the glory of the English law' and necessary for '[t]he impartial administration of justice', which, if 'entirely entrusted to the magistracy, a select body of men', would be subject 'frequently [to] an involuntary bias towards those of their own rank and dignity'." The amendment is generally considered one of the more straightforward amendments of the Bill of Rights. Scholar Charles W. Wolfram states that it has usually "been interpreted as if it were virtually a self-explanatory provision". According to the National Constitution Center, both times the term "common law" is used in the Seventh Amendment refers to "the law and procedure of the courts that used juries, as opposed to Equity and other courts that did not use juries".

Unlike most of the provisions of the Bill of Rights, the Seventh Amendment has never been applied to the states. The Supreme Court stated in Walker v. Sauvinet (1875), Minneapolis & St. Louis Railroad v. Bombolis (1916) and Hardware Dealers' Mut. Fire Ins. Co. of Wisconsin v. Glidden Co. (1931) that states were not required to provide jury trials in civil cases. Nonetheless, most states voluntarily guarantee the right to a civil jury trial, and they must do so in certain state court cases that are decided under federal law.

=== Historical test ===
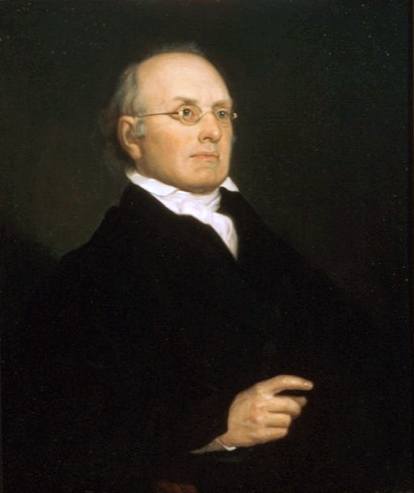
Justice Joseph Story issued the first judicial opinion on the amendment in United States v. Wonson (1812).

The first judicial opinion issued on the amendment came in United States v. Wonson (1812), in which the federal government wished to retry the facts of a civil case it had lost against Samuel Wonson. Supreme Court Justice Joseph Story, acting as a circuit court judge, ruled for Wonson, stating that to retry the facts of the case would violate the Seventh Amendment. Regarding the amendment's phrase "the rules of common law", Story wrote:

Beyond all question, the common law here alluded to is not the common law of any individual state, (for it probably differs in all), but it is the common law of England, the grand reservoir of all our jurisprudence. It cannot be necessary for me to expound the grounds of this opinion, because they must be obvious to every person acquainted with the history of the law.

Wonson's ruling established the historical test, which interpreted the amendment as relying on English common law to determine whether a jury trial was necessary in a civil suit. Applying the historical test in Parsons v. Bedford (1830), for example, the Supreme Court found that jury trials were not constitutionally guaranteed for cases under maritime law, an area in which English common law did not require juries. The Court further clarified this rule as a fixed historical test in Thompson v. Utah (1898), which established that the relevant guide was English common law of 1791, rather than that of the present day. In Dimick v. Schiedt (1935), the Supreme Court declared that the Seventh Amendment was to be interpreted according to the common law of England at the time of the amendment's adoption in 1791. The Supreme Court in Baltimore & Carolina Line, Inc. v. Redman (1935) declared that the right of trial by jury thus preserved by the Preservation Clause is the right which existed under the English common law when the amendment was adopted. "The amendment not only preserves that right, but discloses a studied purpose to protect it from indirect impairment through possible enlargements of the power of reexamination existing under the common law, and, to that end, declares that 'no fact tried by a jury shall be otherwise reexamined in any Court of the United States, than according to the rules of the common law'." In Baltimore & Carolina Line, Inc. v. Redman (1935), the Supreme Court held that the amendment does not include "mere matters of form or procedure", but instead preserves the "substance" of the right to jury trial. The aim of the amendment is particularly to retain the common law distinction between the province of the court and that of the jury whereby, in the absence of express or implied consent to the contrary, issues of law are to be resolved by the court and issues of fact are to be determined by the jury under appropriate instructions by the court. In Chauffeurs, Teamsters, and Helpers Local No. 391 v. Terry (1990), the Court explained that the right to a jury trial provided by the Seventh Amendment encompasses more than the common law forms of action recognized in 1791 (when the Bill of Rights was ratified), but rather any lawsuit in which parties' legal rights were to be determined, as opposed to suits that involve only equitable rights and remedies. This echoes a statement for the Supreme Court in Curtis v. Leother, 415 U.S. 189 (1974) where it stated:

The Seventh Amendment provides that "(i)n suits at common law, where the value in controversy shall exceed twenty dollars, the right of trial by jury shall be preserved." Although the thrust of the Amendment was to preserve the right to jury trial as it existed in 1791, it has long been settled that the right extends beyond the common-law forms of action recognized at that time. Mr. Justice Story established the basic principle in 1830:

"The phrase 'common law', found in this clause, is used in contradistinction to equity, and admiralty, and maritime jurisprudence. ... By common law, (the Framers of the Amendment) meant ... not merely suits, which the common law recognized among its old and settled proceedings, but suits in which legal rights were to be ascertained and determined, in contradistinction to those where equitable rights alone were recognized, and equitable remedies were administered ... In a just sense, the amendment then may well be construed to embrace all suits which are not of equity and admiralty jurisdiction, whatever might be the peculiar form which they may assume to settle legal rights." Parsons v. Bedford, 3 Pet. 433, 446—447, 7 L.Ed. 732 (1830) (emphasis in original).

In SEC v. Jarkesy (2024) the Supreme Court stated the following:

By its text, the Seventh Amendment guarantees that in "[s]uits at common law, . . . the right of trial by jury shall be preserved." In construing this language, we have noted that the right is not limited to the "common-law forms of action recognized" when the Seventh Amendment was ratified. Curtis v. Loether, 415 U. S. 189, 193 (1974). As Justice Story explained, the Framers used the term "common law" in the Amendment "in contradistinction to equity, and admiralty, and maritime jurisprudence." Parsons, 3 Pet., at 446. The Amendment therefore "embrace[s] all suits which are not of equity or admiralty jurisdiction, whatever may be the peculiar form which they may assume." Id., at 447.
The Seventh Amendment extends to a particular statutory claim if the claim is "legal in nature." Granfinanciera, 492 U. S., at 53. As we made clear in Tull, whether that claim is statutory is immaterial to this analysis. See 481 U. S., at 414–415, 417–425. In that case, the Government sued a real estate developer for civil penalties in federal court. The developer responded by invoking his right to a jury trial. Although the cause of action arose under the Clean Water Act, the Court surveyed early cases to show that the statutory nature of the claim was not legally relevant. "Actions by the Government to recover civil penalties under statutory provisions," we explained, "historically ha[d] been viewed as [a] type of action in debt requiring trial by jury." Id., at 418–419. To determine whether a suit is legal in nature, we directed courts to consider the cause of action and the remedy it provides. Since some causes of action sound in both law and equity, we concluded that the remedy was the "more important" consideration. Id., at 421 (brackets and internal quotation marks omitted); see id., at 418–421. (emphasis in original)

In Galloway v. United States (1943), the Court permitted a directed verdict (a verdict ordered by a judge on the basis of overwhelming lack of evidence) in a civil suit, finding that it did not violate the Seventh Amendment under the fixed historical test. The Court extended the amendment's guarantees in Beacon Theatres v. Westover (1959) and Dairy Queen, Inc. v. Wood (1962), ruling in each case that all issues that required trial by jury under English common law also required trial by jury under the Seventh Amendment. This guarantee was also further extended to shareholder suits in Ross v. Bernhard (1970) and to copyright infringement lawsuits in Feltner v. Columbia Pictures TV (1998).

In Markman v. Westview Instruments, Inc. (1996), the Court ruled that many parts of patent claims are questions of law rather than of fact, and that the Seventh Amendment guarantee of a jury trial therefore does not necessarily apply.

Lawsuits against the federal government itself do not receive Seventh Amendment protections due to the doctrine of sovereign immunity. In Lehman v. Nakshian (1981), the Court ruled that "the plaintiff in an action against the United States has a right to trial by jury only where Congress has affirmatively and unambiguously granted that right by statute".

=== Jury size ===
The Supreme Court has held that the Seventh Amendment's guarantee of a jury trial also guarantees a jury of sufficient size. The Court found a six-member jury sufficient to meet the amendment's requirements in Colgrove v. Battin (1973).

=== Twenty-dollar requirement ===
Little historical evidence exists to interpret the amendment's reference to "twenty dollars", which was added in a closed session of the Senate and is often omitted in judicial and scholarly discussion of the amendment. A Harvard Law Review article described it as "mysterious ... of shrouded origin and neglected for two centuries", stating that "no one believes that the Clause bears on the right protected by the Seventh Amendment". According to law professor Philip Hamburger, the twenty-dollar requirement was intended to become obsolete by inflation, so that its application to more cases would be phased out gradually. $20 in 1791 is equivalent to $710 in 2026.

Congress has never extended federal diversity jurisdiction to amounts that small. Under federal law (28 U.S.C. §1332), the amount in dispute must exceed $75,000 for a case to be heard in federal court based on diversity of the parties' citizenship (the parties are from different states or different countries). However, civil cases may arise in federal court that are not diversity cases (e.g., in places like the District of Columbia that are federal jurisdictions), in which case the Twenty Dollars Clause may apply.

=== Re-examination of facts ===
The Re-Examination Clause of the Seventh Amendment states: "In suits at common law, ... no fact tried by jury, shall be otherwise reexamined in any Court of the United States, than according to the rules of the common law." This clause forbids any court from re-examining or overturning any factual determinations made by a jury guaranteeing that facts decided by that jury cannot be reexamined at a later date. Exceptions to this prohibition are possible if it is later determined that legal errors were made or evidence submitted was insufficient in some way. In such cases the re-examination is conducted by another jury so the decision is still left in the hands of the people. The clause applies only to cases where private rights—i.e., rights that exist between private citizens—have been violated. The Re-Examination Clause applies not only to federal courts, but also to "a case tried before a jury in a state court and brought to the Supreme Court on appeal".

In The Justices v. Murray, 76 U.S. 9 Wall. 274 (1869), the Supreme Court quoted Justice Joseph Story to explain the modes to reexamine facts tried by juries according to common law: "Mr. Justice Story ... referring to this part of the amendment, observed ... that it was 'a prohibition to the courts of the United States to re-examine any facts tried by a jury in any other manner [than according to Common Law]'. ... He further observed that 'the only modes known to the common law to re-examine such facts was the granting of a new trial by the court where the issue was tried, or the award of a venire facias de novo, by the appellate court, for some error of law that had intervened in the proceedings.'"

As common law provided, the judge could set aside (or nullify) a jury verdict when the judge decided the verdict was contrary to the evidence or the law. Common law precluded the judge from himself entering a verdict; a new trial, with a new jury, was the only course permissible. In Slocum v. New York Insurance Co. (1913), the Supreme Court upheld this rule. Later cases have undermined Slocum, but generally only when the evidence is overwhelming, or if a specific law provides narrow guidelines by which there can be no reasonable question as to the required outcome, may the court enter "judgment as a matter of law" or otherwise set aside the jury's findings.
