= List of largest civil only pharmaceutical settlements =

The following is a list of the 21 largest civil settlements, reached between the United States Department of Justice and pharmaceutical companies from 2001 to 2017, ordered by the size of the total civil settlement. Some of these matters also resolved criminal fines and penalties, listed in parentheses, but these amounts are not considered when ranking these settlements as some of the settlements listed did not have a criminal component. Thus, this article provides the most accurate list of the largest civil-only portion of settlements between pharmaceutical companies and the Department of Justice. Because this article focuses on civil portions of settlements, some of the larger total settlements do not make the list. For example, Purdue Pharmaceuticals entered an agreement with the United States, pleading guilty to felony misbranding of OxyContin with intent to defraud and mislead under sections 33 1(a) and 333(a)(2) of the FD&C Act and agreed to pay more than $600 million, but only $160 million was allocated to resolve civil claims under the False Claims Act, while the remainder was allocated to resolve criminal claims and private claims.

Legal claims against the pharmaceutical industry have varied widely over the past two decades, including Medicare and Medicaid fraud driven by off-label promotion, and inadequate manufacturing practices. With respect to off-label promotion, specifically, a federal court recognized that bills submitted to Medicare or Medicaid driven by off-label promotion as a violation of the False Claims Act for the first time in Franklin v. Parke-Davis, leading to a $430 million settlement. The civil portion of this settlement was $190 million, and it is the last settlement included in the below table.

Year	Rank (by total)	Rank (by civil component)	Product(s)	Company	Total Settlement (with any criminal and other components)	Settlement (civil component only)	Violation(s)	Laws allegedly violated (if applicable)
2012	1	1	Avandia, Wellbutrin, Paxil, Advair, Lamictal, Zofran, Imitrex, Lotronex, Flovent, Valtrex;	GlaxoSmithKline	$3,000,000,000	$2B civil	Criminal: Off-label promotion, failure to disclose safety data. Civil: paying kickbacks to physicians, making false and misleading statements concerning the safety of Avandia, reporting false best prices and underpaying rebates owed under the Medicaid Drug Rebate Program	False Claims Act/FDCA
2013	3	2	Risperdal/Invega/ Nesiritide	Johnson & Johnson	$2,200,000,000	$1.72 billion civil ($2.2 billion with criminal component)	Off-label promotion/kickbacks	False Claims Act/FDCA
2009	2	3	Bextra/Geodon/ Zyvox/Lyrica	Pfizer	$2,300,000,000	$1 billion civil ($2.3 billion with criminal component)	Off-label promotion/kickbacks	False Claims Act/FDCA
2012	4	4 (tie)	Depakote	Abbott Laboratories	$1,500,000,000	$800 million civil ($1.5 billion with criminal component)	Off-label promotion	False Claims Act/FDCA
2009	5	4 (tie)	Zyprexa	Eli Lilly	$1,450,000,000	$800 million civil ($1.45 billion with criminal component)	Off-label promotion	False Claims Act/FDCA
2008	10	5	Zocor/Vioxx/Pepsid	Merck	$650,000,000	$650 million civil (no criminal component)	Medicare fraud/kickbacks	False Claims Act/ Medicaid Rebate Statute
2012	9	6	Aranesp	Amgen	$672,000,000	$612 million civil ($762 million with criminal component)	Off-label promotion/kickbacks	False Claims Act/FDCA
2010	7	7	Kytril/Bactroban/ Paxil CR/Avandamet	GlaxoSmithKline	$750,000,000	$600 million civil ($750 million with criminal component)	Poor manufacturing practices	False Claims Act/FDCA
2005	8	8	Serostim	Serono	$704,000,000	$567 million civil ($704 million with criminal component)	Off-label promotion/ kickbacks/monopoly practices	False Claims Act
2001	6	9	Lupron	TAP Pharmaceutical Products	$875,000,000	$559 million civil ($875 million with criminal component)	Medicare fraud/kickbacks	False Claims Act/ Prescription Drug Marketing Act
2010	13	10	Seroquel	AstraZeneca	$520,000,000	$520 million (civil only)	Off-label promotion/kickbacks	False Claims Act
2007	12	11	Abilify/Serzone	Bristol-Myers Squibb	$540,000,000	$515 million ($25 million in civil disgorgement)	Off-label promotion/ kickbacks/Medicare fraud	False Claims Act/FDCA
2016	14 (tie)	12	EpiPen (epinephrine)	Mylan	$465,000,000	$465 million (civil only)	Misclassification under the Medicaid Drug Rebate Program	False Claims Act
2010	14 (tie)	13	Trileptal	Novartis	$465,000,000	$390 million ($465 million with co-defendant settlements)	Off-label promotion/kickbacks	False Claims Act/FDCA
2008	17	14	Actiq/Gabitril/Provigil	Cephalon	$425,000,000	$375 million civil ($425 million with criminal component)	Off-label promotion	False Claims Act/FDCA
2004	19	15	Claritin	Schering-Plough	$345,000,000	$290 million civil ($345 million with criminal component)	Medicare fraud/kickbacks	False Claims Act/ Anti-Kickback Statute
2017	20	16	Thalomid/ Revlimid	Celgene Corporation	$280,000,000	$280 million (civil only; non-intervened)	Off-label promotion/ kickbacks/Medicare fraud	False Claims Act/FDCA
2003	18	17	Zoladex	AstraZeneca	$355,000,000	$266 million ($355 million with criminal component)	Medicare fraud	Prescription Drug Marketing Act
2006	15	18	Temodar/ Intron A/K-Dur/ Claritin RediTabs	Schering-Plough	$435,000,000	$255 million civil ($435 million with criminal component)	Off-label promotion/ kickbacks/Medicare fraud	False Claims Act/FDCA
2010	11	19	Botox	Allergan	$600,000,000	$225 million civil ($600 million with criminal component)	Off-label promotion	False Claims Act/FDCA
2004	16	20	Neurontin	Pfizer	$430,000,000	$190 million civil ($430 million with criminal component)	Off-label promotion	False Claims Act/FDCA

== See also ==
- Pharmaceutical fraud
- List of off-label promotion pharmaceutical settlements
