= Califano v. Webster =

- Supreme Court of the United States

Decided March 21, 1977
- Full case name: Califano, Secretary of Health, Education, and Welfare v. Webster
- Citations: 430 U.S. 313 (more) 97 S. Ct. 1192; 51 L. Ed. 2d 360

Court membership
- Chief Justice Warren E. Burger Associate Justices William J. Brennan Jr. · Potter Stewart; Byron White · Thurgood Marshall; Harry Blackmun · Lewis F. Powell Jr. William Rehnquist · John P. Stevens

Case opinions
- Per curiam
- Concurrence: Burger, joined by Stewart, Blackmun, Rehnquist

Califano v. Webster, 430 U.S. 313 (1977), was a case before the United States Supreme Court that was decided per curiam.

== Background ==
=== Statute ===
Under § 215 of the Social Security Act (42 USCS 415), old-age insurance benefits are computed on the basis of the wage earner's "average monthly wage" earned during his "benefit computation years," which are the "elapsed years" (reduced by five) during which his covered wages were highest.

==== Pre-1972 version ====
Under the pre-1972 version, the computation for old age insurance benefits was such that a woman obtained larger benefits than a man of the same age having the same earnings record.

"Elapsed years" depended upon the wage earner's sex: § 215 (b)(3) prescribed that the number of "elapsed years" for a male wage earner would be three higher than for an otherwise similarly situated female wage earner; for a male, the number of "elapsed years" equaled the number of years that elapsed after 1950 and before the year in which he became 65, whereas for a female the number of "elapsed years" equaled the number of years that elapsed after 1950 and before the year in which she became 62. Accordingly, a female could exclude from the computation of her "average monthly wage" three more lower earning years than a similarly situated male could exclude, and this would result in a slightly higher "average monthly wage" and correspondingly higher monthly old-age benefits for the retired female wage earner.

The statutory scheme embodied in the former version of § 415 resulted in a higher "average monthly wage" and a correspondingly higher level of monthly old-age benefits for the retired female worker.

==== 1972 amendment ====
The 1972 amendment altered the formula for computing benefits so as to eliminate the previous distinction between men and women, but only as to men reaching the age of 62 in 1975 or later; it was not given retroactive application.

=== Parties ===
After he had pursued his administrative remedies, a man who had reached the age of 62 before 1975 (The 1972 amendment did not apply to him because he reached age 62 before its effective date), and who was dissatisfied with the amount of his benefits under 215 as amended, brought an action in district court to challenge the constitutionality of 215.

The retired worker requested that the more favorable, prior formula be used to compute his retirement benefits.

=== District court ===
The single-judge District Court (United States District Court for the Eastern District of New York) held that the statutory scheme for determining old age benefits under 215 violated the equal protection component of the due process clause of the Fifth Amendment, on the grounds that

(1) to give women who reached age 62 before 1975 greater benefits than men of the same age and earnings record was irrational, and
(2) in any event the 1972 amendment was to be construed to apply retroactively because otherwise it would be irrational.

(413 F Supp 127)

=== Certiorari and arguments ===
Appellant, the Secretary of Health, Education, and Welfare, sought review of the District Court's order reversing an administrative decision against appellee retired worker.

== Opinion of the court ==
On direct appeal, the United States Supreme Court reversed. The per curiam opinion was joined by Brennan, White, Marshall, Powell, and Stevens.

The Court determined that alterations to old-age benefit payments, as presented in the case, were not constitutionally protected. Congress had the authority to substitute one constitutional calculation method with another, and it was permissible for the new formula to only apply to future cases. The original version of the law being challenged directly aimed to compensate women for prior instances of economic discrimination and was intentionally enacted to address their specific economic disadvantages. The subsequent amendment to Section 415 did not imply that Congress acknowledged its previous policy as being unjustly discriminatory. The application of Section 415, with its prospective effect, did not infringe upon the Fifth Amendment rights of the retired male worker. The Constitution does not prohibit statutory changes from having a starting point, thus allowing for differentiation between the rights of earlier and later periods.

(1) the sex distinction of 215 permitting old age insurance benefits obtained by women reaching the age of 62 before 1975 to be greater than those obtained by men of the same age with the same earnings record did not violate Fifth Amendment equal protection, since the more favorable treatment of female wage earners was not the result of archaic and overbroad generalizations about women, or of the role-typing society had long imposed upon women, but rather served the permissible purpose of redressing society's longstanding disparate treatment of women, operating directly to compensate women for past economic discrimination, and (2) the age distinction of 215 whereby a man reaching the age of 62 in 1975 or later receives the same benefits as a similarly situated woman, while an older man continues to receive less benefits than a woman of the same age with the same earnings record, did not violate Fifth Amendment equal protection, since old age benefit payments were not constitutionally immunized against alterations such as that made by the 1972 amendment of 215, Congress had expressly reserved the right to alter, amend, or repeal any provision of the Social Security Act, and the Fifth Amendment did not forbid statutory changes to have a beginning and thus discriminate between the rights of an earlier and later time.

1. "[Classifications] by gender must serve important governmental objectives and must be substantially related to the achievement of those objectives," Craig v. Boren, 429 U.S. 190, 197.

2. The statutory scheme itself, and the legislative history of former § 215(b)(3), demonstrate that the statute was deliberately enacted to "[redress] our society's long-standing disparate treatment of women," Califano v. Goldfarb, ante, at 209 n. 8, and was not "the accidental by-product of a traditional way of thinking about females." Ante, at 223 (STEVENS, J., concurring in judgment). The statute operated directly to compensate women for past economic discrimination by allowing them to eliminate additional low-earning years from the calculation of their retirement benefits, and in no way penalized women wage earners.

3. The failure to make the 1972 amendment retroactive does not constitute discrimination on the basis of date of birth. Old-age benefits are not constitutionally immunized against alterations of this kind, but Congress may replace one constitutional computation formula with another and make the new formula prospective only.

The Court reversed the order overturning the administrative decision that refused to use the calculations from a former version of the Social Security Act to compute the retired male worker's retirement benefits.

== Concurrence ==
Burger, joined by Stewart, Blackmun, and Rehnquist, concurred in the judgment on the ground that the challenged classification was rationally justifiable on the basis of administrative convenience.
