= Vesting Clauses =

Three clauses in the United States Constitution

In United States constitutional law, the Vesting Clauses are three provisions in the United States Constitution which vest legislative power in Congress, executive power in the President, and judicial power in the federal courts. They were added by Gouverneur Morris during the Committee on Style's final revisions to emphasize that the public was enabling each of the branches.

President Andrew Jackson responded to his censure in 1834 with a written "solemn protest" in which he interpreted these clauses as expressly creating a separation of powers among the three branches of the federal government. In contrast, Victoria F. Nourse has argued that the Vesting Clauses do not create the separation of powers, and it actually arises from the representation and appointment clauses elsewhere in the Constitution.

== Texts ==
Vesting Clause	Article and Section	Text
Legislative Vesting Clause	Article I, Section 1	All legislative Powers herein granted shall be vested in a Congress of the United States, which shall consist of a Senate and House of Representatives.
Executive Vesting Clause	Article II, Section 1, Clause 1	The executive Power shall be vested in a President of the United States of America. He shall hold his Office during the Term of four Years, and, together with the Vice-President chosen for the same Term, be elected, as follows:[...]
Judicial Vesting Clause	Article III, Section 1	The judicial Power of the United States, shall be vested in one supreme Court, and in such inferior Courts as the Congress may from time to time ordain and establish.

== See also ==
- Fusion of powers – Feature of some forms of government
- Separation of powers – Division of a state's government into branches
- Unitary executive theory – Interpretation of the US Constitution regarding presidential power
