= Parsons v. United States =

- Supreme Court of the United States

Argued April 8–9, 1897 Decided May 24, 1897
- Full case name: Parsons v. United States
- Citations: 167 U.S. 324 (more)

Holding
- The Court held, based on its interpretation of Revised Statutes § 769, that the statute fixed the officeholder's term at four years but did not make that term a guarantee of tenure, and that the President's vested removal power was not restricted absent clear language to that effect.

Court membership
- Chief Justice Melville Fuller Associate Justices Stephen J. Field · John M. Harlan; Horace Gray · David J. Brewer; Henry B. Brown · George Shiras Jr. Edward D. White · Rufus W. Peckham

Case opinion
- Majority: Peckham, joined by unanimous

Laws applied
- U.S. Const. art. II, § 2, cl. 2

Parsons v. United States, 167 U.S. 324 (1897), was a decision of the United States Supreme Court concerning the Appointments Clause. The question before the Court was whether the President had the power to remove a district attorney appointed to a four-year term. Beginning with the history of the Decision of 1789, the Court recounted how Vice-President John Adams cast the tie-breaking vote of the First Congress to "[settle] the question of constitutional power in favor of the President".

== Background ==
The question presented was whether the President could remove a duly appointed district attorney before the expiration of his four-year statutory term and appoint a successor with the advice and consent of the Senate. The appellant argued that Revised Statutes §§ 767 and 769 gave district attorneys a legal right to hold office for four years and prohibited their removal during that period.

== Supreme Court ==
The Court first considered whether Revised Statutes § 769 guaranteed district attorneys a fixed four-year term or merely limited their tenure to four years subject to presidential removal. It examined the 1789 debate in the 1st United States Congress over the removal power and, citing James Kent's Commentaries on American Law, concluded that Congress's recognition of presidential removal authority and acquiesence shown by longstanding "universal practice", had "settled the question beyond any power of alteration."

The Court noted that later debates over President Andrew Jackson's removal of federal deposits from the Second Bank of the United States further reinforced this settled understanding of the removal power. It emphasized Daniel Webster's acknowledgment that the President's authority was "settled".

The Court quoted Ex parte Hennen's account of the Decision of 1789, which explained that although the power of removal was generally understood to be incident to the power of appointment, it had been "very early adopted, as the practical construction of the Constitution," that "the power of removal was vested in the President alone".

The Tenure of Office Act of 1867 had departed from this practice by restricting the President's power to remove or suspend executive officers. Although President Andrew Johnson vetoed both measures as unconstitutional limitations on the executive's removal power, Congress enacted them over his veto. By repealing the Tensure of Office ACt, the Court said, Congress intended "to concede to the President the power of removal...when in his discretion he regards it for the public good". The Court also cited opinions by Nathan Clifford, then Attorney General, and John J. Crittenden, emphasizing the longstanding executive branch view that the Decision of 1789 had settled the President's removal power.

The Court concluded that its interpretation of Revised Statutes § 769 furthered Congress's purpose of restoring the President's removal authority after the repeal of the Tenure of Office Act. It reasoned that construing § 769 as guaranteeing tenure would transform a statute intended to enlarge presidential power into one that restricted it.
