= Unitary executive theory =

Interpretation of the US Constitution regarding presidential power

The unitary executive theory is a theory of United States constitutional law holding that the president, as head of the federal government's executive branch, must retain sole authority over executive administration and officials, structurally centralizing control within a unified hierarchy. Weaker formulations are less controversial than maximalist versions, which face more constitutional and practical criticism. During the Reagan era, conservative organizations, including the Federalist Society and the Heritage Foundation, and some Supreme Court justices, most notably Antonin Scalia, began favoring the theory.

The Constitution, Article I, including the Necessary and Proper Clause, authorizes Congress to enact statutes, some of which create offices and structure the administrative state, while Article II vests executive power in the president. The scale and complexity of enforcement have created a professionalized administrative bureaucracy. Proponents of the unitary executive theory say the Executive Vesting Clause and Take Care Clause unify the executive branch, rendering some statutory restrictions unconstitutional and leaving broad authority over officials, including removal, to the president.

This broad authority extends to discretion in implementing laws, including influence over federal agencies' rulemaking and administrative discretion, as well as to executive privilege and information access more generally. Most presidents seek broader authority to more quickly achieve their goals, and the Reagan administration first cited the theory as a doctrinal justification associated with continuing deregulation. During the George W. Bush administration, the theory entered public discourse in connection with expansive assertions of executive authority in national security and administrative law. The Trump administration has used it to assert extensive presidential control over executive branch administration.

Critics challenge the theory and its constitutional basis, noting that most democracies better insulate institutions from the chief executive. They warn that it may weaken political accountability, and cite democratic backsliding in countries where executive authority is consolidated. In Seila Law LLC v. Consumer Financial Protection Bureau (2020), the Roberts Court wrote that "Article II vests the entire 'executive Power' in the President alone [and] generally includes the power to ... remove". The extent of this power remains contested and is shaped by constitutional checks and balances, statute, and judicial precedent, including cases such as Wiener v. United States (1958).

== Background ==
The unitary executive theory originated in conservative legal circles such as the Federalist Society, which was co-founded by Steven G. Calabresi. Calabresi served in the Ronald Reagan White House and Justice Department and became a leading proponent of the theory. The theory draws on the Vesting Clause and Take Care Clause of Article II to support broad presidential authority, an interpretation Calabresi and his coauthors trace through the administrations of most presidents since Franklin D. Roosevelt, including Harry S. Truman, whose administration asserted broad executive authority in defending Truman's 1952 seizure of the nation's steel mills during the Korean War, although the term "unitary executive" emerged later. Proponents of a maximalist and unchecked unitary executive have made textualist and historical arguments defending their version of the theory, sparking debate about the structure of presidential power.

Many scholars have disputed the theory's textual and historical foundations, warning that it concentrates power in ways associated with autocracy and is liable to corruption and authoritarian abuses of power. Its treatment of criminal prosecution as a core executive function may risk the Justice Department's anti-corruption efforts and norms of prosecutorial discretion. Unitary executive theory was long considered fringe, and independent agencies operated with substantial independence from presidential oversight for decades. Most modern democracies do not concentrate administrative oversight in a unitary executive, and legal scholars say the unitary model is unrealistic in the era of modern administration.

White House advisers and other supporters have invoked the theory to bolster the legitimacy of their policy agenda by associating it with the authority of the presidency and claiming an electoral mandate. The theory provides a coherent framework for this argument by emphasizing the role of a single, nationally elected president in directing executive governance. It portrays the president as uniquely accountable to the national electorate and therefore as having a special claim to authority over the executive branch. During the Presidency of George W. Bush, the theory gained prominence in media coverage of controversies involving the commander-in-chief power.

A March 2025 poll by NBC News found that Americans felt the presidency was the branch of government with too much power (43%), followed by the Supreme Court (28%) and Congress (18%). A November 2025 poll by Deseret News found that 51% of Americans felt the president had too much power. Meanwhile, surveys of Americans supporting increasing presidential power showed 6% in 2024 and 9% in 2025.

== Formulations ==
Unitary executive theory has a spectrum of stronger to weaker formulations or interpretations.

The stronger version maintains that the Constitution gives the President broad authority to oversee administrative officials and independent powers to act without congressional authorization. The extent to which the president possesses such powers was left ambiguous by the tripartite framework set out by Justice Robert H. Jackson in his 1952 concurring opinion in Youngstown Sheet & Tube Co. v. Sawyer.

More limited versions reject claims of independent power that would encroach on Congress's legislative and oversight authority. These versions accept statutory protections for independent agencies and, on functional grounds, supports constraints on presidential control as a means of promoting transparency, public deliberation, and sound policymaking.

== Separation of powers ==
Throughout U.S. history, questions have emerged about the separation of powers under the U.S. Constitution, including in many disputes over quasi-judicial and quasi-legislative bodies. The status of unitary executive theory, a formalist separation-of-powers theory, has been perhaps the most controversial issue in federal separation of powers. Broadly, the Supreme Court has applied two separation-of-powers approaches:

- The functional approach considers the branches' essential functions—executive, legislative, and judicial—balancing practicalities, flexibility, and risk assessment. The Court first developed this approach in cases involving alleged encroachment on presidential power, including United States v. Nixon (1974) and Nixon v. Administrator of General Services (1977).
- The formalist approach categorically separates the branches, prioritizing formal or structural boundaries along bright lines. The Court turned to this approach in cases involving alleged encroachment on judicial power, including Commodity Futures Trading Commission v. Schor (1986).

The Court signaled openness to broad separation-of-powers arguments in INS v. Chadha (1983), striking down the legislative veto. Since then, the Court has been inclined to a formalist separation of powers, though there are many Constitutional examples of power mixture (e.g., the president may sign or veto legislation, courts may appoint inferior officers, the Senate may try impeachments to remove executive officers, the vice president is Senate president).

== Constitutional analysis ==
Many have criticized unitary executive theory's constitutional basis. Despite broad agreement that the Framers of the Constitution of the United States created a stronger executive than had existed under the Articles of Confederation, the nature of presidential power has remained contested because the Constitution does not precisely define the office, allowing both individual presidents and changing historical circumstances to shape its practical authority.

=== "All legislative Powers" ===
==== War Powers Clause ====
Congress's war and war-related powers, including "To declare War ..." (the War Powers Clause), appear throughout Articles I–III. Contrary to what some supporters of unitary executive theory believe, most scholars believe the War Powers Clause denies presidents the power to declare war. During the ratification campaign, Hamilton contrasted presidential powers and those of the king, whose military powers the Constitution gave to Congress. Some Founders wanted more checks on the executive because, unlike a hereditary monarch's, the president's well-being was not intrinsically tied to the nation's. The Founders are generally thought to have given to the executive only to be used in quite limited and defensive circumstances.

==== Necessary and Proper Clause ====
The Necessary and Proper Clause gives Congress broad authority "To make all Laws which shall be necessary and proper for carrying into Execution all Powers vested by this Constitution in the Government of the United States, or in any Department or Officer thereof". Legal doctrines favoring executive power would likely limit the Clause's broader reach, yet some scholarly arguments stress Congress's primacy or authority to structure the government. Since Buckley v. Valeo (1976), the Supreme Court has limited Congress's authority to structure the federal government when doing so violates separation-of-powers doctrine.

Congress's implied powers include the authority to compel production of documents and testimony, upheld in McGrain v. Daugherty (1927).

=== "The executive Power" ===
==== Executive Vesting Clause ====
The Executive Vesting Clause reads, "The executive Power shall be vested in a President of the United States of America." Proponents of a broad reading of the Executive Vesting Clause interpret the Necessary and Proper Clause as constrained by the Executive Vesting Clause rather than vice versa. In Morrison v. Olson (1988), Justice Antonin Scalia wrote that vesting "the" executive power "does not mean some of the executive power, but all of it". Jed Shugerman noted that words like 'all' were frequently used throughout the constitution, including in the Legislative Vesting Clause, but not in the Executive Vesting Clause. David Froomkin calls its insertion into the clause the "unitarian inference".

==== Appointments Clause ====
The Appointments Clause was the product of a founding-era compromise over the distribution of appointment authority, giving the Senate influence over executive appointments through the advice-and-consent power.

Nearly a century before the unitary executive theory gained prominence in conservative legal thought, the Supreme Court began defining the relationship between presidential appointment and removal authority, and established that removal was an executive power incidental to the power of appointment. In Myers v. United States (1926), the Court concluded that the President could remove his appointees without seeking the advice and consent of the Senate. The Court traced this to the Decision of 1789, which was discussed in Parsons v. United States (1897). Shurtleff v. United States (1903) addressed the need for a clear statement of congressional intent to restrict removal. Until that time, it was understood that removal was automatic upon Senate confirmation of a new appointee.

Despite the view taken in Myers that legislative restrictions on removal would infringe on a vested executive power, the Supreme Court later upheld such a restriction in Humphrey's Executor v. United States (1935). The precedential force of Humphrey's Executor v. United States was gradually weakened by Free Enterprise Fund v. Public Company Accounting Oversight Board (2010) and Seila Law LLC v. Consumer Financial Protection Bureau (2020), before it was overruled in Trump v. Slaughter (2026), which characterized Wiener v. United States (1958) as a narrower exception.

Those who advance the theory often do so when arguing for more presidential power in hiring and firing members of the executive branch, with some even advocating against the historic independence of administrative law judges, prosecutors (including special counsels), the Office of Special Counsel that protects whistleblowers, inspectors general, the federal reserve, the civil service, and commissions on topics like elections and communications.

==== Take Care Clause or Faithful Execution Clause ====
The Take Care Clause ("The President shall take care that the laws be faithfully executed") has been cited by the Supreme Court in cases concerning presidential authority over executive officials. Myers v. United States (1926) connected the President’s duty to ensure faithful execution of the laws with a power to remove executive officers. Morrison v. Olson (1988) connected the Take Care Clause to the President's authority to ensure that executive officials perform their duties competently and lawfully. Morrison did not abandon Humphrey's Executor outright, though it departed from its functional approach by recognizing that an official exercising executive power could still be independent.

Some scholars have argued that the President’s constitutional duty to ensure the faithful execution of the laws carries a broader responsibility to coordinate policy across executive departments and independent agencies. Echoing Chief Justice Fred M. Vinson’s observation that the president bears broad responsibility for executing federal law, unitary theorists argue that the president is uniquely positioned to coordinate policy across executive departments and independent agencies where statutory authority is fragmented.

Some scholars say the Take Care Clause, together with the Executive Vesting Clause, creates a "hierarchical, unified executive department" under the president's direct control that ensures consistent execution "in accordance with the president's wishes". This version of the theory says the president must be able to control subordinate officers and agencies under the Take Care Clause, stressing that it is the President's constitutional duty to "take Care that the Laws be faithfully executed", and arguably his "alone".

Critics say the president's constitutional role is to faithfully execute the laws enacted by Congress, not to exercise broad supervisory control over agency policy-making, beyond what is necessary to carry out the law. On this view, broad delegations of discretionary authority shift excessive policy-making power to the president, despite Congress's primary responsibility for setting policy through legislation.

==== Commander-in-Chief (military) and Opinion Clauses ====
Some scholars find a compelling case for some form of a unitary executive within the armed forces as the commander in chief. But echoing Jackson's Youngstown concurrence, they say the Commander-in-Chief Clause would be redundant if the Executive Vesting Clause already created a unitary executive, implying that the president lacks comparable authority over the civil service. Critics also cite the Opinion Clause, which permits the president to require written opinions from federal executive departments' principal officers. This would be superfluous, they say, if the president already had unitary executive power.

In Little v. Barreme (1804), Chief Justice John Marshall held that presidential war powers are subject to congressional authority, as the Article II Executive Vesting and Commander-in-Chief Clauses must be balanced against Congress's Article I War Powers and Military Powers Clauses. Presidential exercise of wartime emergency powers has rarely been checked by other branches of the government, and even a perceived threat may be used to justify extraordinary exercises of executive power once an emergency has been declared. Former White House Counsel John Dean said: "In its most extreme form, unitary executive theory can mean that neither Congress nor the federal courts can tell the President what to do or how to do it, particularly regarding national security matters."

== Historical context ==
The unitary executive has been called a "theory in search of a proof", especially of a historical and practical nature, and reconciling robust national leadership with the Constitution has been a problem from the start. The administrative state is sometimes called the fourth branch of government, and since the founding, the dominant legal debate has been how the three formal branches control it. In historical practice, there has been a complex, contested relationship among the president, administrators, and Congress. While support for unitary executive theory has grown among conservative judges, recent academic studies have questioned originalist claims for a unitary executive, and many have warned that unitary executive theory concentrates power in the executive in unintended or unforeseen, impractical, or illegitimate ways.

=== Founding and early government ===
Hamilton's pre-ratification essay Federalist No. 77 (1788), variously interpreted, connected a balanced appointment process to the Constitutional Convention's desire for political stability: "one of the advantages to be expected from the co-operation of the Senate, in the business of appointments, [was] that it would contribute to the stability of the administration."

When William Smith warned in 1789 that unfettered executive discretion would "remove the most worthy men from office" and deter exemplary candidates from accepting public office, James Madison replied: "[I]f anything in its nature is executive, it must be that power which is employed in superintending and seeing that the laws are faithfully executed." 18th- and 19th-century federal officers were expected to execute the law in accordance with rule of law, not the command-and-control (rule-of-man) style of governing advocated for by maximalist versions of the unitary executive theory.

During the 1st United States Congress (1789–91), there were 71 sets of statutory provisions arguably inconsistent with unitary executive theory's strong forms, and some of the early Sinking Fund Commission's members, the chief justice and Senate president (i.e., the vice president), were immune to presidential removal. While critics have made analogies between the Commission and contemporary independent entities (e.g., Federal Reserve and its open market committee), statutory provisions allowed presidential removal of most commissioners (and security purchases required presidential approval).

In the Decision of 1789 (or, on the view that there was no decision, as part of the debates of 1789), Representative James Madison successfully argued for presidential removal power, saying that "appointing, overseeing, and controlling those who execute the laws" is inherently executive, while proposing to exempt a role he saw as partly judicial, the comptroller of the Treasury. He withdrew this proposal when Theodore Sedgwick, Michael Jenifer Stone, and Egbert Benson said the role was mostly executive.

=== Partisanship and presidentialization ===
For stability, the Electoral College, in its original form, sought to insulate presidential selection from partisan politics through electors, with the House of Representatives choosing if no candidate prevailed. Selection was politicized through the First Party System and Jacksonian democracy. President Andrew Jackson's Bank War, including his dismissal of Treasury secretaries, was an early contested claim of presidential control over executive administration. During the Second Party System, party networks filled public administration (a spoils system) and limited presidential independence as party control expanded. Progressive civil service reforms replaced this with a professional bureaucracy and expanded presidential leadership.

In the early twentieth century, concerns about the expansion and fragmentation of the administrative state prompted calls for stronger presidential direction of the executive branch. Political scientist James Hart and economist Edwin E. Witte advocated greater presidential control over administrative agencies, including their rulemaking and legislative functions. Hart, in particular, criticized the growing size, power, and scope of agencies and their poor coordination, arguing that these developments impaired the president's ability to manage the executive branch effectively and fulfill his responsibilities under Article II.

As the administrative state grew during the New Deal (Note: The Federal Register Act of 1935 required documents of "general applicability and legal effect"—regardless of whether the White House labels them orders, proclamations, directives, or otherwise—to be published in the Federal Register. The Act was intended to ensure that the public and the courts have authoritative notice of binding executive actions and to prevent courts from relying on superseded regulations, as had occurred in Panama Refining Co. v. Ryan (1935). In 1937, Congress adopted key Brownlow Committee reforms expanding presidential administrative authority.) and Great Society, presidents of both parties continued issuing presidential directives with varying degrees of unilateralism, rarely ceding powers exercised by their predecessors. Many presidents methodically tried to gain more control of the federal bureaucracy, and after Richard Nixon's failed "administrative presidency", the legal debate focused more on oversight mechanisms, as in Chadha. Expansion of presidential responsibilities occasioned debates over the appropriate scope of presidential influence on federal regulatory policy, with critics warning that excessive control over administrative agencies could contribute to an "imperial presidency".

== Emergence of the theory ==
The push for unitary executive theory arguably began during Watergate scandal as the president's lawyers attempted to block oversight of the government during the investigation, including the release of the oval office tapes. Republican lawyers in the Reagan administration branded efforts to enhance executive power as the unitary executive theory. The presidency had more checks put on it by Congress in the years after Watergate. Congress was strongly considering further insulating the Justice Department from the president after Watergate, but President Jimmy Carter derailed those plans.

In Bowsher v. Synar (1986), the Rehnquist Court held that Congress cannot check the executive by placing executive functions in officials subject to congressional removal. In 1987, Assistant Attorney General John R. Bolton testified before Congress that the Ethics in Government Act's independent counsel provisions were unconstitutional, prefiguring the government's argument in Morrison v. Olson (1988). However, Chief Justice William Rehnquist held in Morrison that the government's unitary executive argument was "more than the text will bear."

=== Reagan administration ===
The Reagan administration's agenda of continuing deregulation was resisted by the iron triangle of advocacy groups, bureaucrats, and Congress, but the administration asserted a broad reading of Myers v. United States as a basis for expanded presidential control over regulatory agencies—while using the Office of Information and Regulatory Affairs to block regulations and filling 5,000 new positions created by the Civil Service Reform Act of 1978 with loyalists (per the Mandate for Leadership).

The Reagan administration had largely reshaped the federal bureaucracy through conservative appointments by the late 1980s. Two obstacles remained: independent agencies that operated outside direct presidential control, and divided government, where Congress could block presidential priorities. Strong unitary executive theory emerged as a conservative constitutional strategy to restore presidential control over the bureaucracy by arguing that the Constitution itself limits Congress's ability either to create bodies that exercise executive power without presidential control or to establish independent centers of executive authority.

The administration attacked independent agencies on two fronts: by reviving the nondelegation doctrine to stop Congress from handing agencies broad, unaccountable regulatory power, and by insisting prosecution was a core executive function that must remain under presidential control. To that end, the administration revived a separation-of-powers formalism spearheaded by Attorney General Edwin Meese, who was himself criminally investigated by a court-appointed independent counsel. Many unitary executive theory proponents clerked for Justice Scalia, who had written an influential dissenting opinion favoring broad presidential removal power in 1988. Attorney General Dick Thornburgh, his staff, and his successor William Barr embraced Scalia's opinion.

Reagan began writing presidential signing statements on legislation, and in 1986, Meese announced that such statements would be included in legislative history materials published by West Publishing "to make sure that the President's own understanding of what's in a bill ... is given consideration at the time of statutory construction later on by a court". The statements also addressed constitutional questions about the separation of powers. In a statement on legislation establishing the DOJ Office of Inspector General, he took the view that the legislation's requirement that the Inspector General report to Congress conflicted with the president's authority under the Take Care Clause to supervise executive officials because it compromised the confidentiality of executive branch deliberations.

=== Rising interest ===
Interest in the theory rose in the 1990s due to Supreme Court rulings on executive power and the Clinton administration's continuation of Reagan and George H. W. Bush policies favoring centralized control, including review of agency rulemaking. In 2001, legal scholar Elena Kagan observed that modern presidents increasingly direct executive agencies to advance their policy agendas. She described this "new presidentialization of administration" as generally lawful and contended that it could improve democratic accountability, transparency, and effective governance. She argued that this could counter bureaucratic inertia and ossification, envisioning "an inevitably pluralist system" of institutional forces constraining the "too facile assertion of unilateral power". (In 2024, her account was dubbed a "Whig history" for its "selectiv[ity] and irenic[ism]".)

=== Political controversy ===
The George W. Bush administration, particularly Vice President Dick Cheney, championed unitary executive theory, making it a political issue. From 2001, Cheney, his lawyer David Addington, Office of Legal Counsel official John Yoo, and Justice Scalia brought the theory to the forefront of executive power debates. Its application influenced the war on terror, including mass surveillance in the United States, the Iraq War, and torture ("enhanced interrogation techniques") at sites like the Guantanamo Bay detention camp and Abu Ghraib prison.

Signing statements became a central feature of the Bush administration's expansive view of the unitary executive. The American Bar Association Task Force on Presidential Signing Statements and the Separation of Powers Doctrine concluded that the administration's use of signing statements threatened the constitutional system of checks and balances. The administration took the position that Congress could not vest "final" or "exclusive" decision-making authority in subordinate officials in a manner inconsistent with the president's constitutional authority "to supervise the unitary executive." Critics objected that the administration's theory of presidential power, which claimed a sweeping authority to override statutes based on the President's own constitutional interpretations, seemed to place the President above the law and undermined the separation of powers.

Barack Obama campaigned against the theory but, as president, embraced some aspects after the 2010 midterm elections.

== Later developments ==
=== Since 2017 ===
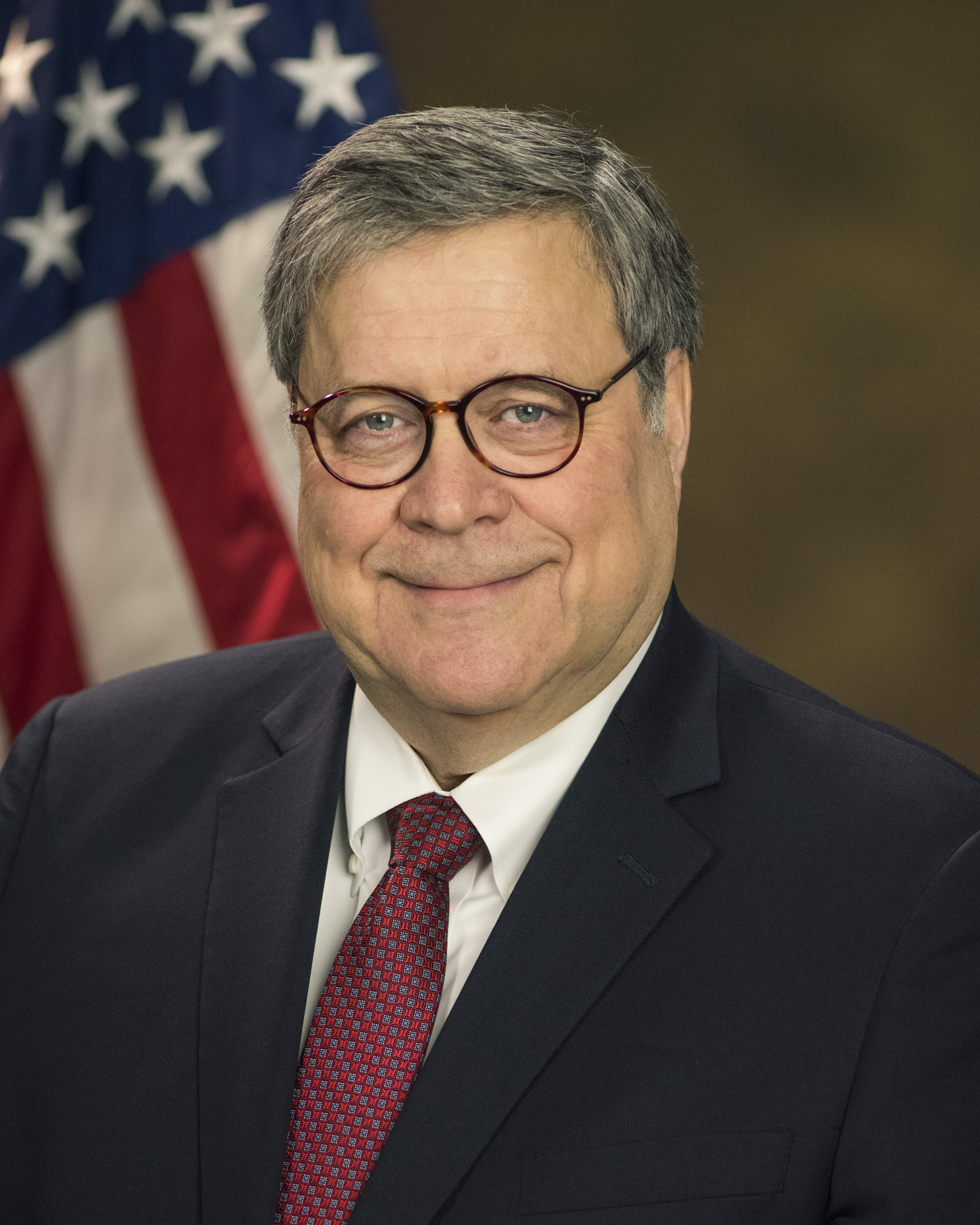
Bill Barr advocated for unitary executive theory

In his first term, Trump exerted more control over the executive than any modern president, citing Article II in 2019, "where I have the right to do whatever I want as president." Before his confirmation as attorney general, Bill Barr supported unitary executive theory in a 2018 memo criticizing the Mueller special counsel investigation.

By 2018, five justices on the Supreme Court had been executive branch lawyers from the Reagan and Bush eras focused on expanding presidential power. In Seila Law LLC v. Consumer Financial Protection Bureau (2020), the Roberts Court held 5–4 that the Executive Vesting Clause gives "the entire 'executive Power' ... to the President alone". The dissent said the constitutional text does not say "entire 'executive power'" or "anything about the President's power to remove subordinate officials at will".

This precedent guided Collins v. Yellen (2021), a 7−2 ruling where Alito wrote the Constitution prohibits even "modest restrictions" on the president's removing single-officer agency heads. The Court reaffirmed that precedents found in Humphrey's Executor and Morrison were the only exceptions to this removal power.

Project 2025 sought to establish a framework for expanding presidential power during the second Trump administration based on a maximalist version of the unitary executive theory. The BBC called Project 2025's application of unitary executive theory to independent agencies "controversial". Robert Shea, a former OMB official in the George W. Bush administration, told The Atlantic: "I can't overstate my level of concern about the damage this would do to the institution of the federal government."

Trump v. United States (2024), viewed by some as embracing unitary executive theory, further empowered the presidency.

=== Since 2025 ===
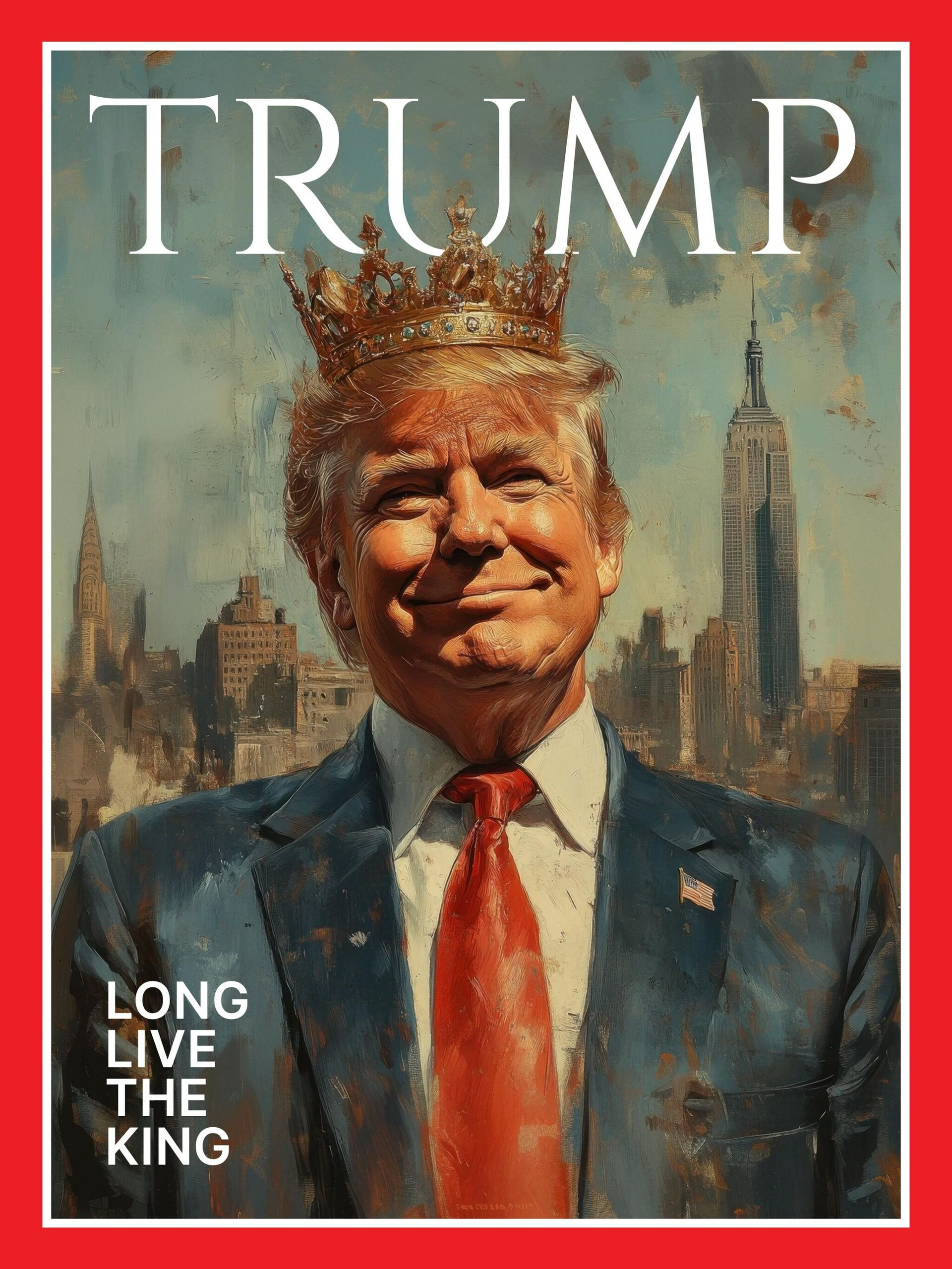
White House social media posted an image depicting Trump as a king, showing the administration's expansive view of presidential power

Trump's second administration embraced unitary executive theory, including some its most extreme or fringe versions. Seeking the "destruction of the deep state" (after strategist Steve Bannon's "deconstruction of the administrative state"), Trump expanded control over agencies and the civil service, quickly reinstating Schedule Policy/Career. He ordered the targeting of political opponents and civil society and undertook mass firings of employees, inspectors general, and independent agency and oversight board members who might obstruct him, setting up Supreme Court tests on agencies Congress insulated from presidential control.

Having generally emphasized constitutional text, structure, and historical practice, rather than functional balancing or deference to Congress, the Roberts Court largely ruled in favor of the administration, resulting in a significant expansion of presidential power. Several judges appointed by Donald Trump—Jennifer Mascott, Neomi Rao, and Justin Walker—have endorsed a stronger version of the theory, similar to the approach associated with Antonin Scalia.

==== Law enforcement and prosecutorial independence ====
The administration said that the Constitution grants the executive a right to control or cease law enforcement, which legal experts called a "constitutional power to immunize private parties to commit otherwise illegal acts with impunity". In February 2025, Attorney General Pam Bondi warned career Justice Department lawyers they could not "substitute personal political views or judgments for those that prevailed in the election" and could face discipline if they failed to vigorously defend the administration's policies. Emil Bove sent a similar letter to Danielle Sassoon, triggering a wave of resignations as each federal prosecutor instructed to seek dismissal of the Eric Adams indictment refused to do so.

==== Impoundment ====
The administration pursued a revived impoundment power, with Russell Vought and Mark Paoletta citing Article II's Executive Vesting, Faithful Execution, and Commander-in-Chief Clauses as authorizing executive power to decline spending congressionally appropriated funds and as undermining the constitutionality of the Impoundment Control Act of 1974. Impoundment has not been a central feature of the unitary executive, but the administration has tried to extend the theory outward to override this explicit legislative act constraining how the executive interacts with Congress's constitutional power.

Though the Supreme Court has not ruled on the extent of the president's constitutional authority, if any, to impound funds, Chief Justice Roberts and Justice Brett Kavanaugh previously wrote against impoundment, and in Consumer Financial Protection Bureau v. Community Financial Services Association of America, Ltd. (2024), the Court wrote, "our Constitution gives Congress control over the public fisc" under the Appropriations Clause. As of 2025, impoundment was not supported by court precedent and was opposed by many experts as a fringe position.

==== Removal power ====
In 2025, Executive Order 14215 increased White House oversight of independent agencies, giving the president greater influence over their rulemaking, priorities, and budgets, exceeding the expectations of many of the theory's proponents. In March 2025, the D.C. Circuit held that the president could remove members of the National Labor Relations Board and Merit Systems Protection Board, finding removal restrictions unconstitutional. The theory's impact on federal administration raised concerns over loss of federal expertise.

After stressing the First and Second Bank of the United States as historical precedents to the Federal Reserve, the Court held in Trump v. Cook (2026) that the Federal Reserve was immune to at-will removals. On the same day, it also decided in Trump v. Slaughter (2026) that the president may execute removals of any subordinate without cause, and that Congressional for-cause removal protections are not permitted per the separation of powers.

Views on the Slaughter decision ranged from its sacrificing institutional stability and safeguards against political favoritism, corruption, and presidential overreach to its restoring presidential control over executive officials. It may weaken the administrative state by limiting agencies' powers, or Congress may restrict formerly independent agencies to limit presidential power. It may also prompt renewed scrutiny of which governmental functions are properly understood as executive in nature.

== States' plural executives ==
A plural executive was rejected by the Constitutional Convention, where the Virginia Plan's single president, rather than the New Jersey Plan's executive council, prevailed to create "unity in the executive". Reflecting a long history of distrust of unilateral executive action, early governors were largely confined to executing legislative policy and not given any prerogative powers like the veto or control over appointments. The gradual strengthening of state executives was influenced by leaders including John Jay, Gouverneur Morris, James Duane, Robert R. Livingston, and John Adams, whose wartime experience highlighted the need for more effective executive government. Even so, anti-monarchical sentiment remained strong, and many Americans continued to favor executive councils and other institutional restraints over vesting executive authority in a single person, reflecting an understanding of separation of powers that emphasized limiting executive power rather than maintaining equal branches.

Most states still have plural executives, where officers such as governors, lieutenant governors, attorneys general, comptrollers, and secretaries of state have separate elections. A unitary executive does not exist at state or local governments.

== See also ==
- Administrative Conference of the United States
- Administrative Procedure Act
- Federalist No. 70
- Independent state legislature theory
- Interstate Commerce Commission
- Landis Report
