= Considerations on Representative Government =

1861 book by John Stuart Mill

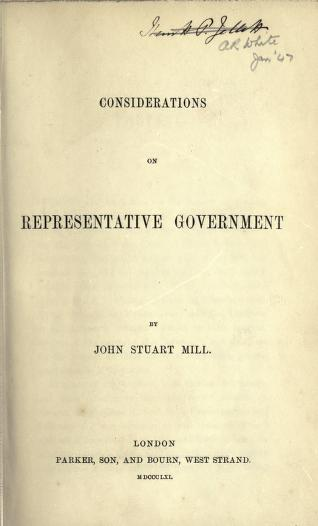
- Title page of the first edition
- Author: John Stuart Mill
- Language: English
- Publisher: Parker, Son and Bourn
- Publication date: 1861
- Publication place: United Kingdom
- Media type: Print
- Pages: viii, 340 pp.

Considerations on Representative Government is a book by John Stuart Mill published in 1861.

== Summary ==
Mill argues that representative government is the ideal form and that the function of legislatures is less so to enact legislation than to host public debate on the various opinions held by the population and to oversee those who prepare and administer laws and public policy:

Their part is to indicate wants, to be an organ for popular demands, and a place of adverse discussion for all opinions relating to public matters, both great and small; and, along with this, to check by criticism, and eventually by withdrawing their support, those high public officers who really conduct the public business, or who appoint those by whom it is conducted.

He endorsed the concept of proportional representation and single transferable voting, earlier proposed by Thomas Hare.

At the same time he stated that better educated voters should have more votes than less educated. This type of plural voting, he stated, was necessary to preserve the educated from the class legislation passed by representatives of the uneducated for their own benefit, but he said such inequality must stop short of enabling the minority (the better-educated) to pass class legislation for their own benefit.
