= Ex parte Hennen =

- Supreme Court of the United States

Decided January 26, 1839
- Full case name: Ex parte Duncan N. Hennen
- Citations: 38 U.S. 230 (more)

Holding
- The power of removal is incidental to the power of appointment under the Appointments Clause. All officers of the United States may be removed at the will of the appointing authority unless otherwise provided by law.

Court membership
- Chief Justice Roger B. Taney Associate Justices Joseph Story · Smith Thompson; John McLean · Henry Baldwin; James M. Wayne · Philip P. Barbour; John Catron · John McKinley

Case opinion
- Majority: Thompson, joined by unanimous

Laws applied
- U.S. Const. art. II, § 2, cl. 2

Ex Parte Hennen, 38 U.S. (13 Pet.) 230 (1839), was a United States Supreme Court decision concerning the removal power under the Appointments Clause.

== Background ==
Ex parte Hennen arose from a petition by Duncan N. Hennen seeking a writ of mandamus directing Judge Philip K. Lawrence of the United States District Court for the Eastern District of Louisiana to restore him to the office of clerk. Hennen alleged that he had been duly appointed clerk by Judge Samuel H. Harper in 1834, had received a commission, qualified by giving the required bond, and had faithfully and satisfactorily performed the duties of the office. Under federal law, his appointment also made him clerk of the United States circuit court for the district. He asserted that he had continuously held both offices until May 1838, when Judge Lawrence notified him that he had been removed and that John Winthrop had been appointed as his successor.

Hennen contended that he had never resigned or been lawfully removed from either the district or circuit court clerkship, and that Lawrence's appointment of Winthrop was void.

The Supreme Court of the United States treated the case as presenting a single legal question: whether Hennen had shown sufficient grounds to justify issuing a rule requiring Lawrence to show cause why a writ of mandamus should not issue. The Court observed that if Hennen had been lawfully removed from the office of clerk, his application necessarily failed because there would be no basis for ordering his reinstatement.

== Supreme Court ==
The Supreme Court ruled that in the absence of any constitutional or statutory guarantee of tenure, an officer was subject to removal at the discretion of the appointing authority.

The Court explained that the Decision of 1789 concerned only whether officers appointed by the President of the United States with the advice and consent of the United States Senate could be removed by the President without the Senate's approval. The Court concluded that the "settled and well understood construction of the Constitution" confirmed that "the power of removal [is] incident to the power of appointment", unless a different tenure had been expressly provided. It declined to decide any broader question.

== See also ==
- Decision of 1789
- Unitary executive theory
