= List of clauses of the United States Constitution =

The United States Constitution and its amendments comprise hundreds of clauses which outline the functioning of the United States Federal Government, the political relationship between the states and the national government, and affect how the United States federal court system interprets the law. When a particular clause becomes an important or contentious issue of law, it is given a name for ease of reference.

== Within the Articles ==
| Article | Section | Clause | Common names |
|---|---|---|---|
| I | 1 | | Legislative Vesting Clause |
| I | 2 | 3 | Apportionment Clause |
| I | 2 | 5 | Impeachment Clause (Power to Impeach) |
| I | 3 | 7 | Impeachment Clause (Effect of) |
| I | 6 | 1 | Speech or Debate Clause |
| I | 6 | 2 | Ineligibility Clause; Incompatibility Clause; Emoluments Clause; Sinecure Clause |
| I | 7 | 1 | Origination Clause; Revenue Clause |
| I | 7 | 2-3 | Presentment Clause |
| I | 7 | 3 | Orders, Resolutions, and Votes Clause |
| I | 8 | 1 | Taxing and Spending Clause; Spending Clause; General Welfare Clause; Common Defense Clause; Uniformity Clause |
| I | 8 | 3 | Commerce Clause; Foreign Commerce Clause; Indian Commerce Clause; Interstate Commerce Clause |
| I | 8 | 4 | Naturalization Clause Bankruptcy Clause |
| I | 8 | 5 | Weights and Measures Clause |
| I | 8 | 7 | Postal Clause |
| I | 8 | 8 | Copyright Clause |
| I | 8 | 11 | War Powers Clause |
| I | 8 | 12 | Army Clause |
| I | 8 | 13 | Navy Clause |
| I | 8 | 15 | Militias Clause |
| I | 8 | 17 | Enclave Clause |
| I | 8 | 18 | Necessary and Proper Clause; Elastic Clause; Basket Clause; Coefficient Clause; Sweeping Clause; Implied Powers Clause |
| I | 9 | 1 | 1808 Clause; Migration or Importation Clause |
| I | 9 | 2 | Suspension Clause |
| I | 9 | 5 | Export Clause |
| I | 9 | 5 | Appropriations Clause |
| I | 9 | 8 | Emolument Clause; Title of Nobility Clause (federal) |
| I | 10 | 1 | Contract Clause |
| I | 10 | 2 | Import-Export Clause |
| I | 10 | 3 | Compact Clause; Tonnage Clause |
| II | 1 | 1 | Executive Vesting Clause |
| II | 1 | 5 | Natural-born Citizen Clause |
| II | 2 | 2 | Appointments Clause; Advice and Consent Clause; Excepting Clause; Treaty Clause |
| II | 3 | | Take Care Clause; Reception Clause; Faithful Execution Clause |
| II | 4 | | Impeachment Clause |
| III | 1 | | Judicial Vesting Clause |
| III | 2 | 1 | Case or Controversy Clause; Arisings Clause |
| III | 2 | 2 | Exceptions Clause |
| IV | 1 | | Full Faith and Credit Clause |
| IV | 2 | 1 | Comity Clause; Privileges and Immunities Clause |
| IV | 2 | 2 | Extradition Clause |
| IV | 2 | 3 | Fugitive Slave Clause |
| IV | 3 | 1 | Admissions Clause |
| IV | 3 | 2 | Property Clause; Territorial Clause |
| IV | 4 | | Guarantee Clause |
| VI | | 2 | Supremacy Clause |
| VI | | 3 | Loyalty Clause |

== Clauses within the Amendments ==
=== First Amendment ===
- Establishment Clause
- Free Exercise Clause
- Free Speech Clause
- Free Press Clause
- Free Assembly Clause
- Petition Clause

=== Fourth Amendment ===
- Search and Seizure Clause

=== Fifth Amendment ===
- Double Jeopardy Clause
- Due Process Clause (along with the Fourteenth Amendment)
- Self-Incrimination Clause
- Takings Clause
- Grand Jury Clause

=== Sixth Amendment ===
- Assistance of Counsel Clause
- Compulsory Process Clause
- Confrontation Clause
- Impartial Jury Clause
- Information Clause
- Public Trial Clause
- Speedy Trial Clause
- Vicinage Clause

=== Eighth Amendment ===
- Excessive Bail Clause
- Cruel and Unusual Punishment Clause
- Excessive Fines Clause

=== Fourteenth Amendment ===
- Citizenship Clause
- Privileges or Immunities Clause
- Due Process Clause
- Equal Protection Clause

=== Recurring clauses ===
- Enforcement clause
