= Davis v. Massachusetts =

Davis v. Commonwealth of Massachusetts
- Supreme Court of the United States

Argued March 25, 1897 Decided May 10, 1897
- Full case name: Davis v. Commonwealth of Massachusetts
- Citations: 167 U.S. 43 (more) 17 S. Ct. 731; 42 L. Ed. 71

Court membership
- Chief Justice Melville Fuller Associate Justices Stephen J. Field · John M. Harlan; Horace Gray · David J. Brewer; Henry B. Brown · George Shiras Jr. Edward D. White · Rufus W. Peckham

Case opinion
- Majority: White, joined by unanimous

Davis v. Commonwealth of Massachusetts, 167 U.S. 43 (1897), was a case in which the Supreme Court of the United States sustained a conviction of a man for making a speech on Boston Common in violation of an ordinance that forbade the making of a public address there without a permit from the mayor.

== Facts of the case ==
Section 66 of the Revised Ordinances of the City of Boston (1893) reads as follows:

'Sec. 66. No person shall, in or upon any of the public grounds, make any public address, discharge any cannon or firearm, expose for sale any goods, wares or merchandise, erect or maintain any booth, stand, tent or apparatus for the purposes of public amusement or show, except in accordance with a permit from the mayor.'

It was alleged by the prosecution that Davis made a speech on Boston Common without a permit. Davis was brought before the Municipal Court of the City of Boston and convicted of violating section 66.

== Prior history ==
The proceedings were removed to the Superior Court of the county of Suffolk, where Davis renewed a motion which he had interposed in the municipal court to quash the complaint. There were seven reasons argued to support the motion; among these was the assertion that the ordinance violated the rights alleged to be secured to the accused by the constitution of the state, and by the Fourteenth Amendment. The motion to quash being overruled by the Superior Court, Davis was tried before the court and a jury.

At the trial the government put in evidence the ordinance heretofore referred to, and called the attention of the court to sections 35 and 39 of chapter 448 of the acts passed by the legislature of Massachusetts in the year 1854. Davis was convicted and subsequently appealed to the Supreme Court.

== Decision ==
Davis' conviction was upheld by a unanimous decision of the Supreme Court.
