= Legislative Vesting Clause =

Executive power of the federal government belongs to the U.S. President

The Legislative Vesting Clause (Article I, Section 1) of the United States Constitution bestows the legislative power of the United States federal government to the United States Congress. Similar clauses are found in Article II and Article III; the former bestows federal executive power exclusively in the President of the United States, and the latter grants judicial power solely to the United States Supreme Court, and other federal courts established by law. These three clauses together secure a separation of powers among the three branches of the federal government, and individually, each one entrenches checks and balances on the operation and power of the other two branches.

== Text ==
All legislative Powers herein granted shall be vested in a Congress of the United States, which shall consist of a Senate and House of Representatives.

== See also ==
- List of clauses of the United States Constitution
