= List of United States Supreme Court cases, volume 167 =

Supreme Court of the United States
- Interactive map of Supreme Court of the United States
- 38°53′26″N 77°00′16″W
- Established: March 4, 1789; 236 years ago
- Location: Washington, D.C.
- Coordinates: 38°53′26″N 77°00′16″W
- Composition method: Presidential nomination with Senate confirmation
- Authorised by: Constitution of the United States, Art. III, § 1
- Judge term length: life tenure, subject to impeachment and removal
- Number of positions: 9 (by statute)
- Website: supremecourt.gov

This is a list of cases reported in volume 167 of United States Reports, decided by the Supreme Court of the United States in 1897.

== Justices of the Supreme Court at the time of volume 167 U.S. ==
The Supreme Court is established by Article III, Section 1 of the Constitution of the United States, which says: "The judicial Power of the United States, shall be vested in one supreme Court . . .". The size of the Court is not specified; the Constitution leaves it to Congress to set the number of justices. Under the Judiciary Act of 1789 Congress originally fixed the number of justices at six (one chief justice and five associate justices). Since 1789 Congress has varied the size of the Court from six to seven, nine, ten, and back to nine justices (always including one chief justice).

When the cases in volume 167 were decided the Court comprised the following nine members:

Portrait	Justice	Office	Home State	Succeeded	Date confirmed by the Senate (Vote)	Tenure on Supreme Court
	Melville Fuller	Chief Justice	Illinois	Morrison Waite	July 20, 1888 (41–20)	October 8, 1888 – July 4, 1910 (Died)
	Stephen Johnson Field	Associate Justice	California	newly created seat	March 10, 1863 (Acclamation)	May 10, 1863 – December 1, 1897 (Retired)
	John Marshall Harlan	Associate Justice	Kentucky	David Davis	November 29, 1877 (Acclamation)	December 10, 1877 – October 14, 1911 (Died)
	Horace Gray	Associate Justice	Massachusetts	Nathan Clifford	December 20, 1881 (51–5)	January 9, 1882 – September 15, 1902 (Died)
	David Josiah Brewer	Associate Justice	Kansas	Stanley Matthews	December 18, 1889 (53–11)	January 6, 1890 – March 28, 1910 (Died)
	Henry Billings Brown	Associate Justice	Michigan	Samuel Freeman Miller	December 29, 1890 (Acclamation)	January 5, 1891 – May 28, 1906 (Retired)
	George Shiras Jr.	Associate Justice	Pennsylvania	Joseph P. Bradley	July 26, 1892 (Acclamation)	October 10, 1892 – February 23, 1903 (Retired)
	Edward Douglass White	Associate Justice	Louisiana	Samuel Blatchford	February 19, 1894 (Acclamation)	March 12, 1894 – December 18, 1910 (Continued as chief justice)
	Rufus W. Peckham	Associate Justice	New York	Howell Edmunds Jackson	December 9, 1895 (Acclamation)	January 6, 1896 – October 24, 1909 (Died)

== Citation style ==
Under the Judiciary Act of 1789 the federal court structure at the time comprised District Courts, which had general trial jurisdiction; Circuit Courts, which had mixed trial and appellate (from the US District Courts) jurisdiction; and the United States Supreme Court, which had appellate jurisdiction over the federal District and Circuit courts—and for certain issues over state courts. The Supreme Court also had limited original jurisdiction (i.e., in which cases could be filed directly with the Supreme Court without first having been heard by a lower federal or state court). There were one or more federal District Courts and/or Circuit Courts in each state, territory, or other geographical region.

The Judiciary Act of 1891 created the United States Courts of Appeals and reassigned the jurisdiction of most routine appeals from the district and circuit courts to these appellate courts. The Act created nine new courts that were originally known as the "United States Circuit Courts of Appeals." The new courts had jurisdiction over most appeals of lower court decisions. The Supreme Court could review either legal issues that a court of appeals certified or decisions of court of appeals by writ of certiorari.

Bluebook citation style is used for case names, citations, and jurisdictions.

- "# Cir." = United States Court of Appeals
  - e.g., "3d Cir." = United States Court of Appeals for the Third Circuit
- "C.C.D." = United States Circuit Court for the District of . . .
  - e.g.,"C.C.D.N.J." = United States Circuit Court for the District of New Jersey
- "D." = United States District Court for the District of . . .
  - e.g.,"D. Mass." = United States District Court for the District of Massachusetts
- "E." = Eastern; "M." = Middle; "N." = Northern; "S." = Southern; "W." = Western
  - e.g.,"C.C.S.D.N.Y." = United States Circuit Court for the Southern District of New York
  - e.g.,"M.D. Ala." = United States District Court for the Middle District of Alabama
- "Ct. Cl." = United States Court of Claims
- The abbreviation of a state's name alone indicates the highest appellate court in that state's judiciary at the time.
  - e.g.,"Pa." = Supreme Court of Pennsylvania
  - e.g.,"Me." = Supreme Judicial Court of Maine

== List of cases in volume 167 U.S. ==
Case Name	Page & year	Opinion of the Court	Concurring opinion(s)	Dissenting opinion(s)	Lower Court	Disposition
Compton v. Jesup	1 (1897)	Shiras	none	none	6th Cir.	certification
In re Hall	38 (1897)	Peckham	none	none	Ct. Cl.	mandamus denied
Davis v. Massachusetts	43 (1897)	White	none	none	Mass. Super. Ct.	affirmed
Northern P.R.R. Co. v. Poirier	48 (1897)	Shiras	none	none	9th Cir.	reversed
Walker v. Collins	57 (1897)	White	none	none	8th Cir.	reversed
Cross v. Evans	60 (1897)	White	none	none	5th Cir.	dismissed
Spokane Falls et al. Ry. Co. v. Ziegler	65 (1897)	Shiras	none	none	9th Cir.	affirmed
Willis v. Eastern T. & B. Co.	76 (1897)	Fuller	none	none	D.C. Cir.	dismissed
Latta v. Granger	81 (1897)	Fuller	none	none	8th Cir.	reversed
Latta v. Neubert	87 (1897)	Fuller	none	none	8th Cir.	reversed
Wabash R.R. Co. v. City of Defiance	88 (1897)	Brown	none	none	Ohio	affirmed
Bryant v. United States	104 (1897)	Brown	none	none	C.C.S.D.N.Y.	affirmed
Enterprise M. Co. v. Rico A.C.M. Co.	108 (1897)	Brewer	none	none	8th Cir.	affirmed
Campbell v. Ellet	116 (1897)	Brewer	none	none	Colo.	affirmed
In re Johnson	120 (1897)	Brown	none	none	S.D. Ind. Terr.	habeas corpus denied
Burdon C.S.R. Co. v. Payne	127 (1897)	Fuller	none	none	5th Cir.	certification
London A. v. Companhia de Moagens	149 (1897)	Peckham	none	none	3d Cir.	affirmed
Levy v. Superior Ct.	175 (1897)	Harlan	none	none	Cal.	dismissed
Stone v. United States	178 (1897)	Harlan	none	none	9th Cir.	affirmed
Twin City Nat'l Bank v. Nebecker	196 (1897)	Harlan	none	none	D.C. Cir.	affirmed
Lumberman's Nat'l Bank v. Huston	203 (1897)	Harlan	none	none	D.C. Cir.	affirmed
Tindal v. Wesley	204 (1897)	Harlan	none	none	4th Cir.	affirmed
United States v. American B.T. Co.	224 (1897)	Brewer	none	none	1st Cir.	affirmed
Indiana v. Kentucky	270 (1897)	Fuller	none	none	original	border set
Tla-Koo-Yel-Lee v. United States	274 (1897)	Peckham	none	none	D. Alaska	reversed
United States v. Sandoval	278 (1897)	Fuller	none	none	Ct. Priv. Land Cl.	multiple
Rio Arriba L. & C. Co. v. United States	298 (1897)	Fuller	none	none	Ct. Priv. Land Cl.	affirmed
May v. May	310 (1897)	Gray	none	none	D.C. Cir.	affirmed
Parsons v. United States	324 (1897)	Peckham	none	none	Ct. Cl.	affirmed
Yardley v. Philler	344 (1897)	White	none	none	3d Cir.	reversed
California Nat'l Bank v. Kennedy	362 (1897)	White	none	none	Cal.	reversed
City of New Orleans v. Citizens' Bank	371 (1897)	White	none	none	C.C.E.D. La.	reversed
Louisiana ex rel. Citizens' Bank v. Parish of Orleans	407 (1897)	White	none	none	La.	affirmed
Louisiana v. City of New Orleans	407 (1897)	White	none	none	La.	affirmed
Hovey v. Elliott	409 (1897)	White	none	none	N.Y.	affirmed
Parsons v. Chicago et al. Ry. Co.	447 (1897)	Brewer	none	none	8th Cir.	affirmed
Merchants' & M. Nat'l Bank v. Pennsylvania	461 (1897)	Brewer	none	none	Pa.	affirmed
Warner v. City of New Orleans	467 (1897)	Brewer	none	none	5th Cir.	certification
ICC v. Cincinnati et al. R.R. Co.	479 (1897)	Brewer	none	none	6th Cir.	certification
Wight v. United States	512 (1897)	Brewer	none	none	W.D. Pa.	affirmed
Savannah et al. Ry. Co. v. Florida F.E.	512 (1897)	Brewer	none	none	not indicated	reversed
Camfield v. United States	518 (1897)	Brown	none	none	8th Cir.	affirmed
Whitney v. United States	529 (1897)	Brown	none	none	Ct. Priv. Land Cl.	reversed
Bauman v. Ross	548 (1897)	Gray	none	none	D.C. Cir.	reversed
The J.P. Donaldson	599 (1897)	Gray	none	none	6th Cir.	certification
The Glide	606 (1897)	Gray	none	none	Mass. Super. Ct.	reversed
Peck v. Heurich	624 (1897)	Gray	none	none	D.C. Cir.	affirmed
ICC v. Detroit et al. Ry. Co.	633 (1897)	Shiras	none	none	6th Cir.	affirmed
Shapleigh v. City of San Angelo	646 (1897)	Shiras	none	none	C.C.W.D. Tex.	reversed
St. Joseph et al. R.R. Co. v. Steele	659 (1897)	Shiras	none	none	8th Cir.	reversed
United States v. Reed	664 (1897)	Shiras	none	none	2d Cir.	affirmed
Hedrick v. Atchison et al. R.R. Co.	673 (1897)	Shiras	none	none	Mo.	affirmed
Mackall v. Willoughby	681 (1897)	Shiras	none	none	D.C. Cir.	affirmed
MacGreal v. Taylor	688 (1897)	Harlan	none	none	D.C. Cir.	reversed
Menotti v. Dillon	703 (1897)	Harlan	none	none	Cal.	reversed
De Guyer v. Banning	723 (1897)	Harlan	none	none	Cal.	affirmed

== See also ==
- Certificate of division
