= Interstate Commerce Commission v. Cincinnati, New Orleans & Texas Pacific Railway Co. =

1897 US Supreme Court administrative law case

Interstate Commerce Commission v. Cincinnati, New Orleans and Texas Pacific Railway Co.
- Supreme Court of the United States

Argued March 22–23, 1897 Decided May 24, 1897
- Full case name: Interstate Commerce Commission v. Cincinnati, New Orleans and Texas Pacific Railway Company
- Citations: 167 U.S. 479 (more) 17 S. Ct. 896; 42 L. Ed. 243; 1897 U.S. LEXIS 2111

Case history
- Prior: Certiorari from the Court of Appeals for the Sixth Circuit

Court membership
- Chief Justice Melville Fuller Associate Justices Stephen J. Field · John M. Harlan; Horace Gray · David J. Brewer; Henry B. Brown · George Shiras Jr. Edward D. White · Rufus W. Peckham

Case opinions
- Majority: Brewer, joined by Fuller, Field, Gray, Brown, Shiras, White, Peckham
- Dissent: Harlan

Laws applied
- Interstate Commerce Act

Interstate Commerce Commission v. Cincinnati, New Orleans and Texas Pacific Railway Co., 167 U.S. 479 (1897), also called the Queen and Crescent Case, was an important early US Supreme Court case in the development of American administrative law.

== Background ==
=== Administrative law ===
In the United States, administrative agencies operate within the Executive Branch, rather than the Legislative Branch of Congress. The scope of their authority is determined by the explicit provisions of its organic statute, rather than implied regulatory areas. The major questions doctrine further restricts administrative law in areas of major political or economic significance.

=== Case ===
The Interstate Commerce Commission (ICC) set rates for rail transport, ordering all rail companies to either comply or cease their operations. In a lawsuit appealed to the US Court of Appeals for the Sixth Circuit, the ICC sought an injunction forcing the Cincinnati, New Orleans and Texas Pacific Railway into compliance. The Sixth Circuit sent a certified question to the US Supreme Court, asking:

Had the interstate commerce commission jurisdictional power to make the order hereinbefore set forth; all proceedings preceding said order being due and regular, so far as procedure is concerned?

== Supreme Court ==
The ICC's authority stemmed from its organic statute, the Interstate Commerce Act of 1887. After finding that this act did not expressly authorize the setting of railroad rates, the Supreme Court analyzed the act's first section, which provided that "all charges [...] should be reasonable and just; and every unjust and unreasonable charge for such serve is prohibited and declared to be unlawful." The ICC argued that Congress' failure to specify "reasonable charges" implicitly authorized the agency to set this standard. However, in a majority opinion written by Associate Justice David J. Brewer, the Supreme Court rejected this argument, holding that organic statutes can only grant executive and administrative powers, not legislative authority over rail transport rates.

Associate Justice John Marshall Harlan dissented without writing an opinion.

== Legacy ==
In 1906, Congress passed the Hepburn Act to explicitly grant such rate-setting power. Legal scholar Thomas W. Merrill and retired Supreme Court Justice Stephen Breyer have cited the Supreme Court's acceptance of the Hepburn Act to rebut the nondelegation doctrine.
