= Bicknell v. Comstock =

- Supreme Court of the United States

Submitted January 8, 1885 Decided January 19, 1885
- Full case name: Bicknell v. Comstock
- Citations: 113 U.S. 149 (more) 5 S. Ct. 399; 28 L. Ed. 962

Court membership
- Chief Justice Morrison Waite Associate Justices Samuel F. Miller · Stephen J. Field; Joseph P. Bradley · John M. Harlan; William B. Woods · Stanley Matthews; Horace Gray · Samuel Blatchford

Case opinion
- Majority: Miller, joined by unanimous

Bicknell v. Comstock, 113 U.S. 149 (1885), was an action to recover the cost paid for a tract of land in Iowa and the value of the improvements made by the defendant. The complaint alleged a conveyance by Bicknell to one Bennett, the subsequent transfer to the defendant by sundry mesne conveyances, valuable improvements on the premises made by Bennett and his grantees, and a failure of title in Bicknell, when the deed was made by reason of a superior title in the State of Iowa under a land grant. Judgment below for plaintiff, to reverse which this writ of error was brought.

The mutilation (without the consent and against the protest of the grantee) of a land patent for public land by the Commissioner of the United States General Land Office, after its execution and transmission to the grantee, and the like mutilation of the record thereof, do not affect the validity of the patent. A state statute of limitations as to real actions begins to run in favor of a claimant under a patent from the United States on the issue of the patent and its transmission to the grantee.

== See also ==
- Fussell v. Gregg: 1885 case regarding a disputed land patent in Ohio
- Wilcox v. Jackson: 1839 case regarding a disputed land patent in Illinois
- List of United States Supreme Court cases, volume 113
