= Executive Order 14215 =

2025 executive order signed by Donald Trump

- Ensuring Accountability for All Agencies
- Front page of Executive Order 14215
- Type: Executive order
- Number: 14215
- President: Donald Trump
- Signed: February 18, 2025

Federal Register details
- Federal Register document number: 2025-03063
- Publication date: February 22, 2025

Executive Order 14215, titled Ensuring Accountability for All Agencies, is an executive order signed by Donald Trump on February 18, 2025. Among other things, it directs independent agencies to regularly consult with the White House, including by submitting significant regulations for review before publication, and directs all executive branch officials to follow legal interpretations issued by the president or attorney general.

== Provisions ==
The order directs independent agencies, namely those listed in 44 U.S.C. § 3502(5), to submit significant regulations to the White House Office of Management and Budget's Office of Information and Regulatory Affairs for review before publication. It directs each of them to create a White House liaison position and to regularly consult with the White House, and gives OMB oversight over independent agencies' spending.

The order also directs that the "authoritative interpretations of law for the executive branch" shall be made by the "President and the Attorney General" and prohibits executive branch officials from taking a legal position contrary to those interpretations.

The order exempts Federal Reserve decision-making on interest rates – but not its oversight of the banking system.

== Response ==
The Democratic Party (DNC, DCCC, and DSCC) filed a lawsuit in the D.C. District Court on February 28, 2025, claiming that the provision requiring the Federal Election Commission (among other independent agencies) to follow legal interpretations of the president or attorney general violates the Federal Election Campaign Act. On June 3, Judge Amir Ali dismissed the case for lack of standing.

== See also ==
- Civil service independence
- Executive aggrandizement in democratic backsliding
- Unitary executive theory
