= Fussell v. Gregg =

- Supreme Court of the United States

Argued January 8 – January 9, 1885 Decided February 2, 1885
- Full case name: Fussell v. Gregg & Others
- Citations: 113 U.S. 550 (more) 5 S. Ct. 631; 28 L. Ed. 993

Court membership
- Chief Justice Morrison Waite Associate Justices Samuel F. Miller · Stephen J. Field; Joseph P. Bradley · John M. Harlan; William B. Woods · Stanley Matthews; Horace Gray · Samuel Blatchford

Case opinion
- Majority: Woods, joined by unanimous

Fussell v. Gregg, 113 U.S. 550 (1885), was an appeal from the United States District Court for the Northern District of Ohio regarding a bill in equity filed November 20, 1879, to establish the title of the plaintiff to, and recover the possession of, a certain tract of land in the County of Logan, in the State of Ohio, and for an account of rents and profits. The dispute was one of many issues with land titles in the former Virginia Military District section of Ohio.

== Decision ==
The court syllabus states:

- A court in equity has no jurisdiction over a suit based upon an equitable title to real estate unless the nature of the relief asked for is also equitable.
- A court of the United States sitting in equity cannot control the principal surveyor of the Virginia Military District in the discharge of his official duties or take charge of the records of his office or declare their effect to be other than what appears on their face.
- The plain meaning of the Act of March 23, 1804, 2 Stat. 274, to ascertain the boundaries of the Virginia Military District in Ohio is that a failure within five years to make return to the Secretary of War of the survey of any tract located within the territory, made previous to the expiration of the five years, should discharge the land from any claim founded on such location and survey and extinguish all rights acquired thereby.
- The series of acts relating to this district, beginning with the Act of March 23, 1804, and ending with the Act of July 7, 1838, 5 Stat. 282, as revived and continued in force by later acts, are to be construed together, and as if the third section of the Act of March 23, 1804, had been repeated in every act of the series.
- The Act of March 3, 1855, 10 Stat. 701, allowing persons who had made entries before January 1, 1852, two years time to return their surveys did not apply to those who had made both entries and surveys before the latter date.
- The land office referred to in § 2 of the Act of May 27, 1880, 21 Stat. 142, relating to the Virginia Military District in Ohio is the United States General Land Office.
- On the pleas and issues in this cause, the complainant has failed to make good the case stated in the bill.

The plaintiff insisted that the first and second sections of the Act of May 27, 1880, repeal by implication the third section of the Act of March 23, 1804. There is no ground for such a contention. It is most unreasonable to suppose that Congress intended, by doubtful inference, to repeal the salutary provision of § 4 of the act of 1804, which, in numerous enactments, it had cautiously preserved for a period of seventy-six years, and on which the titles to a vast domain rested.

The object of the first and second sections of the Act of May 27, 1880, was not to confer new rights, but to preserve rights already vested from impairment by any construction which might be placed on the Act of February 18, 1871, by which the unsurveyed and unsold lands in the Virginia Military District were ceded to the State of Ohio. But it is enough to say that there is no inconsistency between the two enactments, one of which is said to repeal the other. There can therefore be no repeal by implication.

It followed that the plaintiff could derive no aid from any act of Congress passed since the first day of January 1852. On that day, all interest and estate of the heirs of Archibald Gordon in the lands covered by his entry recorded on January 1, 1823, and his survey recorded on November 6, 1824, ceased and determined. The plaintiff therefore has failed to make good her averment that she has an equitable estate in fee simple to the premises in controversy. She has therefore shown no right to the relief prayed by her bill.

The court found that it was immaterial whether the land patent of Gregg under which the defendants claim was valid or void. The plaintiff, having no title, can have no relief against them. The defendants, being in possession, are entitled to retain possession until ousted by one who has the title. The decree of the circuit court, by which the bill was dismissed, was therefore right, and was affirmed.

== See also ==
- Bicknell v. Comstock: 1885 case regarding a disputed land patent in Iowa
- Wilcox v. Jackson: 1839 case regarding a disputed land patent in Illinois
- List of United States Supreme Court cases, volume 113
