= Wilcox v. Jackson =

- Supreme Court of the United States

Argued February 27–28, March 2, 4–6, 1839 Decided March 9, 1839
- Full case name: De La Fayette Wilcox v. John Jackson
- Citations: 38 U.S. 498 (more) 13 Pet. 498; 10 L. Ed. 264; 1839 U.S. LEXIS 457

Court membership
- Chief Justice Roger B. Taney Associate Justices Joseph Story · Smith Thompson; John McLean · Henry Baldwin; James M. Wayne · Philip P. Barbour; John Catron · John McKinley

Case opinion
- Majority: Barbour, joined by unanimous

Wilcox v. Jackson, 38 U.S. (13 Pet.) 498 (1839), sometimes nicknamed the "Beaubien Land Case" was a legal action decided by the United States Supreme Court concerning the land under Fort Dearborn shortly after incorporation of Chicago as a town in Cook County, Illinois.

== Background ==
The U.S. Army built Fort Dearborn near the confluence of the Chicago River and Lake Michigan in 1804, pursuant to a land concession by Native Americans in the Treaty of Greenville in 1795, as modified in the 1803 Treaty of Fort Wayne. Farmers and traders also settled upon and improved land near the fort, which served as refuge during various conflicts. Hostilities with Native Americans escalated after the 1809 Treaty of Fort Wayne, and the fort was destroyed shortly after the beginning of the War of 1812, which led to an evacuation order that resulted in the Fort Dearborn massacre of August 15, 1812.

The U.S. Army rebuilt Fort Dearborn in 1816, but only periodically occupied it. However, even without the military presence, the U.S. government stationed a factor and Indian Agent at or adjacent to the Fort for trading with nearby Native American peoples, as well as to pay annuities under those and other treaties, including 1816 Treaty of St. Louis and the 1821 Treaty of Chicago. Trader Jean Baptiste Beaubien, who had bought a shack and farm next to the fort in 1812, then returned to the area, built a home and trading post in 1816, and in 1822 bought the nearby factor house after it was closed following the previous year's treaty. Meanwhile, the settlement grew. A town was platted in 1829 as part of the construction of the Illinois and Michigan Canal (designed to link Lake Michigan with the Mississippi River via its tributary the Illinois River), and a real estate boom ensued. The state legislature chartered the Town of Chicago following a census in 1833 which showed 500 residents, among them Beaubien and his relatives.

Meanwhile, on May 29, 1830, the U.S. Congress passed a temporary act (later revived by an act in 1832 and the act of June 19, 1834) granting a right of pre-emption to those who cultivated and were in actual possession of public lands, so settlers who had improved and occupied public lands the right to buy them from the government. Robert McKinzie, the son of recently deceased trader John Kinzie managed to get such a land patent for his land his father had occupied (and where he had lived) on the west side of the Chicago River. Beaubien twice sought a similar patent for his land on the east side of the Chicago River, but two different land agents (first in Palestine, Illinois and later in Danville, Illinois) issued formal letters of rejection. Meanwhile, local Native Americans agreed to relocate across the Mississippi River in the 1833 Treaty of Chicago, so many expected the fort's permanent closure.

In 1835, upon hearing about further land sales except to the extent settlers already lived and improved on the tracts, Beaubien tried again to patent his homestead, this time at the new Chicago land office. He paid $94.61 and tendered documents claiming 75.69 acres, and seemed to succeed. He received a certificate from the registrar (who had consulted with the local U.S. attorney), which he conveyed (sold) to attorney Murray McConnell, who had established a law office downstate in Morgan County, Illinois and who for a time was a state legislator. McConnell leased the lakefront land to John Jackson, but the U.S. Army again occupied the fort, so Major Lafayette Wilcox was living on part of the tract. Jackson (with McConnell as his lawyer) pursued an action in ejectment against Wilcox.

Future Illinois governor Thomas Ford was the initial judge, who pointed out that the United States General Land Office had failed to act and complete the paperwork by issuing a land patent in exchange for the tendered registration certificate, and so invalidated Beaubien's claim as incomplete. When Beaubien appealed, the Illinois Supreme Court (in an opinion drafted by his friend Theophilus W. Smith) found his claim valid on the grounds that the Illinois legislature had never authorized the military reservation. Thus, the trial court found for the commander, but the Supreme Court of Illinois found for the lessee.

== Opinion of the Court ==
In reversing, the Court ruled that the original settler of the property did not acquire title because it was reserved from sale by the president under the authority of the 1830 act. Also, no land patent was given and only such a patent would convey perfect title enforceable against the government. The register's certificate was not evidence of title.

== Aftermath ==
Following the Supreme Court decision, the U.S. District Court ordered Beaubien's payment returned, but the military realized the fort unnecessary since Native Americans had left the area. Therefore, the United States General Land Office proceeded to ready the property for subdivision and public auction as the "Fort Dearborn Addition to Chicago" (reserving only space for a lighthouse and quarters for the harbormaster). The subsequent sale of 233 lots raised $106,042.16 for the federal government, despite the decline of real estate prices after the Panic of 1837. Beaubien had pleaded with fellow Chicagoans not to bid on the six lots which contained his home seventeen-plus years earlier, as well as garden and outbuildings (many previously legitimately from the government during the fort's downsizing). Nonetheless, attorney James H. Collins, who had assisted the government's case against Beaubien's claim, bought five of the six lots for about $1000, and Beaubien could only purchase one of them, for $225. Either Beaubien then sold his lot when he couldn't buy the rest of his homestead, or Collins actually evicted Beaubien from his Michigan Avenue home in 1839. However, Collins was later less successful in his lawsuit against the Illinois Central Railroad for encroaching on his lakefront property, and when the federal government formally abandoned the lighthouse and harbor area in 1854, Beaubien's friend, Congressman John Wentworth secured special legislation allowing Beaubien to patent those nine lots.

== See also ==
- Bicknell v. Comstock: 1885 case regarding a disputed land patent in Iowa
- Fussell v. Gregg: 1885 case regarding a disputed land patent in Ohio
- List of United States Supreme Court cases, volume 38
