= Article Two of the United States Constitution =

Portion of the U.S. Constitution regarding the executive branch and impeachment

Article Two of the United States Constitution establishes the executive branch of the federal government, which carries out and enforces federal laws. Article Two vests the power of the executive branch in the office of the president of the United States, lays out the procedures for electing and removing/impeaching the president, and establishes the president's powers and responsibilities.

Section 1 of Article Two establishes the positions of the president and the vice president, and sets the term of both offices at four years. Section 1's Vesting Clause declares that the executive power of the federal government is vested in the president and, along with the Vesting Clauses of Article One and Article Three, establishes the separation of powers among the three branches of government. Section 1 also establishes the Electoral College, the body charged with electing the president and the vice president. Section 1 provides that each state chooses members of the Electoral College in a manner directed by each state's respective legislature, with the states granted electors equal to their combined representation in both houses of Congress. Section 1 lays out the procedures of the Electoral College and requires the House of Representatives to hold a contingent election to select the president if no individual wins a majority of the electoral vote. Section 1 also sets forth the eligibility requirements for the office of the president, provides procedures in case of a presidential vacancy, and requires the president to take an oath of office.

Section 2 of Article Two lays out the powers of the presidency, establishing that the president serves as the commander-in-chief of the military. This section gives the president the power to grant pardons. Section 2 also requires the "principal officer" of any executive department to tender advice.

Though not required by Article Two, President George Washington organized the principal officers of the executive departments into the Cabinet, a practice that subsequent presidents have followed. The Treaty Clause grants the president the power to enter into treaties with the approval of two-thirds of the Senate. The Appointments Clause grants the president the power to appoint judges and public officials subject to the advice and consent of the Senate, which in practice, has meant that presidential appointees must be confirmed by a majority vote in the Senate. The Appointments Clause also establishes that Congress can, by law, allow the president, the courts, or the heads of departments to appoint "inferior officers" without requiring the advice and consent of the Senate. The final clause of Section 2 grants the president the power to make recess appointments to fill vacancies that occur when the Senate is in recess.

Section 3 of Article Two lays out the responsibilities of the president, granting the president the power to convene both Houses of Congress, receive foreign representatives, and commission all federal officers. Section 3 requires the president to inform Congress of the "state of the union"; since 1913, this has taken the form of a speech referred to as the State of the Union. The Recommendation Clause requires the president to recommend measures deemed "necessary and expedient." The Take Care Clause requires the president to obey and enforce all laws, though the president retains some discretion in interpreting the laws and determining how to enforce them.

Section 4 of Article Two gives directives on impeachment. The directive states, "The President, Vice President and all civil Officers of the United States shall be removed from office on Impeachment for, and conviction of, Treason, Bribery, or other high Crimes and Misdemeanors."

== Section 1: President and vice president ==
=== Clause 1: Executive power and term of office ===
The executive Power shall be vested in a President of the United States of America. He shall hold his Office during the Term of four Years, and, together with the Vice President, chosen for the same Term, be elected, as follows:

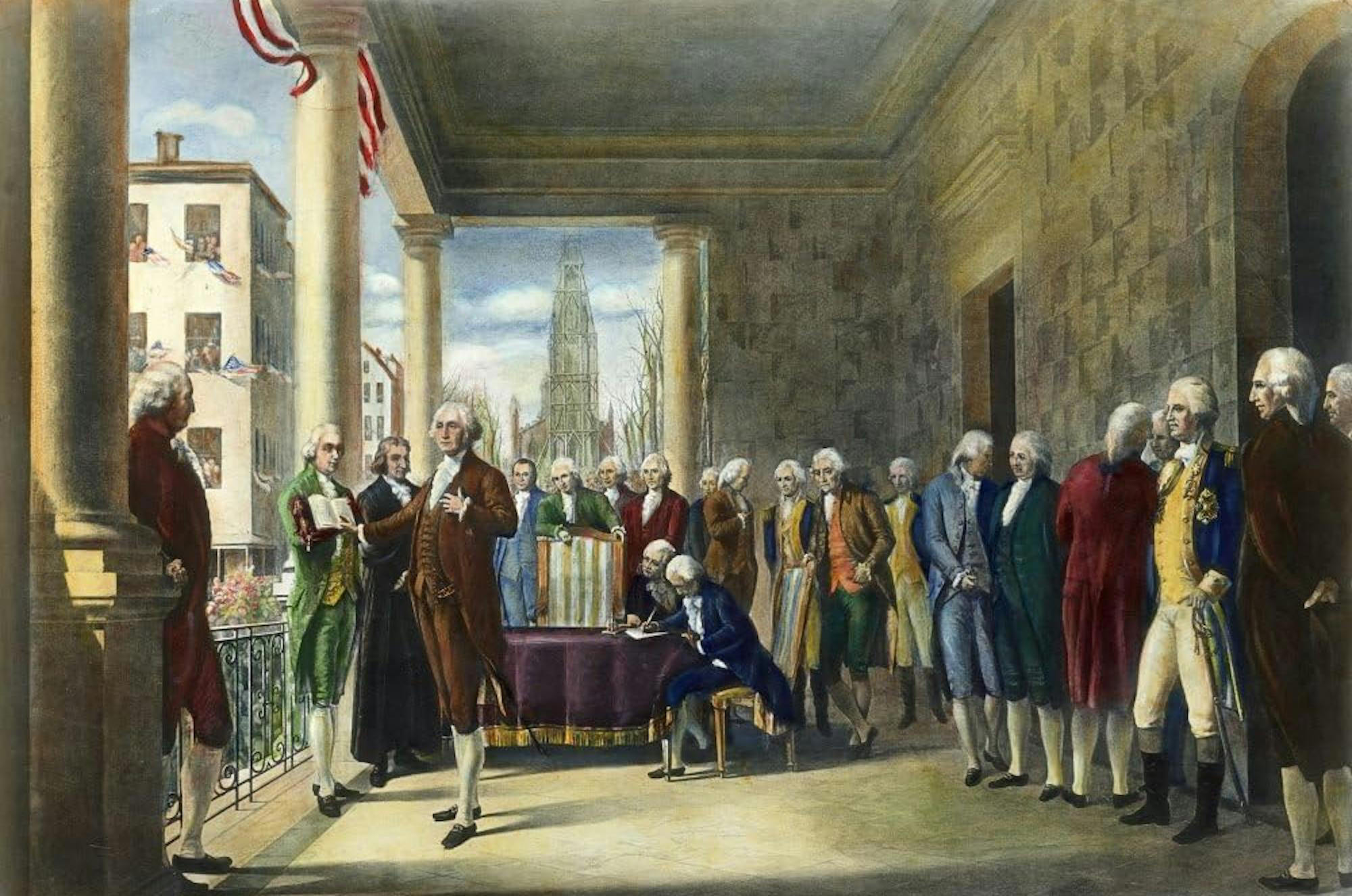
George Washington's inauguration as the first U.S. president, April 30, 1789, by Ramon de Elorriaga (1889)

Section 1 begins with a vesting clause that confers federal executive power upon the president. Similar clauses are found in Article I and Article III; the former bestows federal legislative power exclusively to Congress, and the latter grants judicial power solely to the Supreme Court, and other federal courts established by law. These three articles together secure a separation of powers among the three branches of the federal government, and individually, each one entrenches checks and balances on the operation and power of the other two branches.

Article I grants certain powers to Congress, and the Vesting Clause does not reassign those powers to the president. In fact, because those actions require legislation passed by Congress which must be signed by the president to take effect, those powers are not strictly executive powers granted to or retained by Congress per se. Nor were they retained by the U.S. Congress as leftovers from the Articles of Confederation. The Articles of Confederation, Continental Congress and its powers were abolished at the time the new U.S. Congress was seated and the new federal government formally and officially replaced its interim predecessor.

The President may order military action in defense of the United States pursuant to "a national emergency created by attack upon the United States, its territories or possessions, or its armed forces". The President must notify Congress within 48 hours after the beginning of military operations, giving the source of his authority for the action. Once legal notification is given to Congress, military action can continue for up to 60 days without further authorization from Congress, or up to 90 days if the President "determines and certifies to the Congress in writing that unavoidable military necessity respecting the safety of United States Armed Forces requires the continued use of such armed forces in the course of bringing about a prompt removal of such forces."

=== Clause 2: Method of choosing electors ===
Each State shall appoint, in such Manner as the Legislature thereof may direct, a Number of Electors, equal to the whole Number of Senators and Representatives to which the State may be entitled in the Congress: but no Senator or Representative, or Person holding an Office of Trust or Profit under the United States, shall be appointed an Elector.

Under the U.S. Constitution, the president and vice president are chosen by electors, under a constitutional grant of authority delegated to the legislatures of the several states. The Constitution reserves the choice of the precise manner for selecting electors to the will of the state legislatures. It does not define or delimit what process a state legislature may use to create its state college of electors. In practice, the state legislatures have generally chosen to select electors through an indirect popular vote, since the 1820s. Most states use a "winner-take-all" system in which all the state's electors are awarded to the candidate gaining the most popular votes. Maine and Nebraska allow individual congressional districts to each elect one elector.

In an indirect popular vote, it is the names of the candidates who are on the ballot to be elected. Most states do not put the names of the electors on the ballot. It is generally understood by the voters and the electors themselves that they are the representative "stand-ins" for the candidates and are expected to cast their electoral college ballots for the president and vice president who appeared on the ballot. The actual electors being voted for are usually selected by the candidate's party. There have been a few cases where some electors have refused to vote for the designated candidate, termed a faithless elector. Many states have mandated in law that electors shall cast their electoral college ballot for the designated presidential candidate. The constitutionality of such mandates was established by the Supreme Court of the United States in Chiafalo v. Washington (2020).

Each state chooses as many electors as it has representatives and senators representing it in Congress. Under the 23rd Amendment, the District of Columbia may choose no more electors than the state with the lowest number of electoral votes (in effect, three electors), although since that amendment's ratification the District's population has never reached the threshold that would otherwise entitle it to choose four or more electors. U.S. Senators, Representatives and federal government officials are barred from becoming electors; in practice, the two major federal parties frequently select senior state party and government officials (up to and including governors) to serve as electors.

All states other than Maine (including the District of Columbia) use a first past the post system in their presidential elections. In 2020, Maine switched from first past the post to ranked choice.

In McPherson v. Blacker (1892), the Supreme Court affirmed the ability of a state to appoint its electors based on electoral districts rather than a statewide popular vote, describing the power of state legislatures to determine the method of appointment of electors as "plenary", and suggesting that it was not limited even by state constitutions. In Bush v. Palm Beach County Canvassing Board (2000), the Supreme Court remanded to the Supreme Court of Florida the question of "the extent to which the Florida Supreme Court saw the Florida Constitution as circumscribing the legislature's authority under Art. II, § 1, cl. 2". In Williams v. Rhodes (1968), the Court struck down as a violation of the Equal Protection Clause an Ohio law which placed heavy burdens on minor parties seeking to be placed on the ballot for presidential electors.

The Supreme Court upheld the power of Congress to regulate political contributions intended to influence the appointment of electors in Burroughs v. United States (1934).

=== Clause 3: Electoral College ===
The Electors shall meet in their respective States, and vote by Ballot for two Persons, of whom one at least shall not be an Inhabitant of the same State with themselves. And they shall make a List of all the Persons voted for, and of the Number of Votes for each; which List they shall sign and certify, and transmit sealed to the Seat of the Government of the United States, directed to the President of the Senate. The President of the Senate shall, in the Presence of the Senate and House of Representatives, open all the Certificates, and the Votes shall then be counted. The Person having the greatest Number of Votes shall be the President, if such Number be a Majority of the whole Number of Electors appointed; and if there be more than one who have such Majority, and have an equal Number of Votes, then the House of Representatives shall immediately chuse [sic] by Ballot one of them for President; and if no Person have a Majority, then from the five highest on the List the said House shall in like Manner chuse [sic] the President. But in chusing [sic] the President, the Votes shall be taken by States, the Representation from each State having one Vote; A quorum for this Purpose shall consist of a Member or Members from two thirds of the States, and a Majority of all the States shall be necessary to a Choice. In every Case, after the Choice of the President, the Person having the greatest Number of Votes of the Electors shall be the Vice President. But if there should remain two or more who have equal Votes, the Senate shall chuse [sic] from them by Ballot the Vice President.

(Note: This procedure was changed by the 12th Amendment in 1804.)

In modern practice, parties nominate their electors through various methods. Then, each state chooses its electors in popular elections. In most states, the party with the plurality of the popular vote gets all of its electors chosen. Once chosen, the electors meet in their respective states to cast ballots for the president and vice president. Originally, each elector cast two votes for president; at least one of the individuals voted for had to be from a state different from the elector's. The individual with the majority of votes became president, and the runner-up became vice president. In case of a tie between candidates who received votes from a majority of electors, the House of Representatives would choose one of the tied candidates; if no person received a majority, then the House could again choose one of the five with the greatest number of votes. When the House voted, each state delegation cast one vote, and the vote of a majority of states was necessary to choose a president. If second-place candidates were tied, then the Senate broke the tie. A quorum in the House consisted of at least one member from two-thirds of the state delegations; there was no special quorum for the Senate. This procedure was followed in 1801 after the electoral vote produced a tie, and nearly resulted in a deadlock in the House.

The 12th Amendment introduced a number of important changes to the procedure. Now, electors do not cast two votes for president; rather, they cast one vote for president and another for vice president. In case no presidential candidate receives a majority, the House chooses from the top three (not five, as before the 12th Amendment). The Amendment also requires the Senate to choose the vice president from those with the two highest figures if no vice presidential candidate receives a majority of electoral votes (rather than only if there's a tie for second for president). It also stipulates that to be the vice president, a person must be qualified to be the president.

=== Clause 4: Election day ===
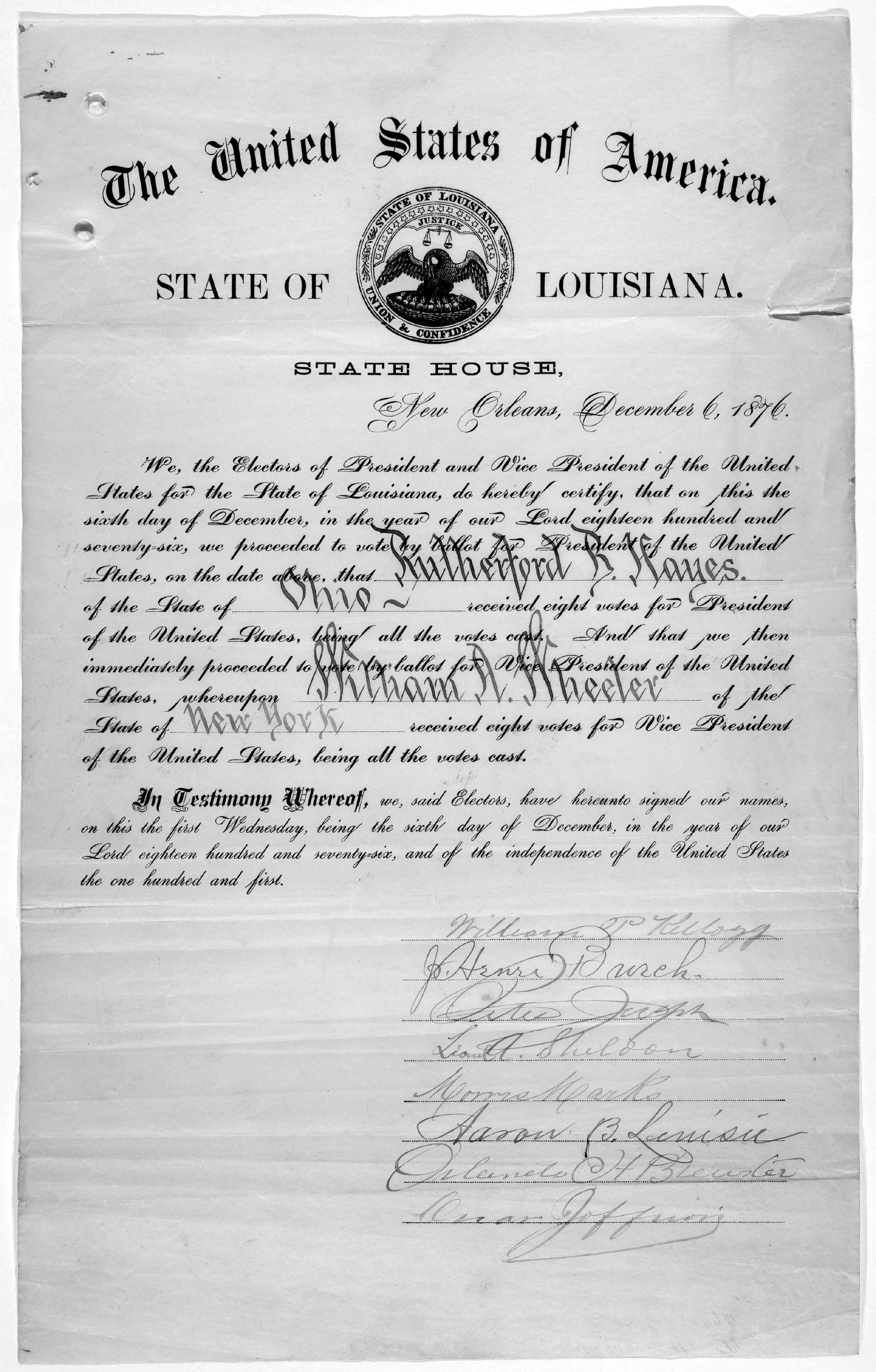
Certificate for the vote for Rutherford B. Hayes and William A. Wheeler for the State of Louisiana

The Congress may determine the Time of chusing [sic] the Electors, and the Day on which they shall give their Votes; which Day shall be the same throughout the United States.

Congress sets a national Election Day. Currently, electors are chosen on the Tuesday following the first Monday in November (the first Tuesday after November 1), in the year before the president's term is to expire. The electors cast their votes on the Monday following the second Wednesday in December (the first Monday after December 12) of that year. Thereafter, the votes are opened by the president of the Senate, and then counted by Congress in a joint session.

=== Clause 5: Qualifications for office ===
Beginning of the clause in the 1787 document

Section 1 of Article Two of the United States Constitution sets forth the eligibility requirements for serving as president of the United States:

No Person except a natural born Citizen, or a Citizen of the United States, at the time of the Adoption of this Constitution, shall be eligible to the Office of President; neither shall any person be eligible to that Office who shall not have attained to the Age of thirty five Years, and been fourteen Years a Resident within the United States.

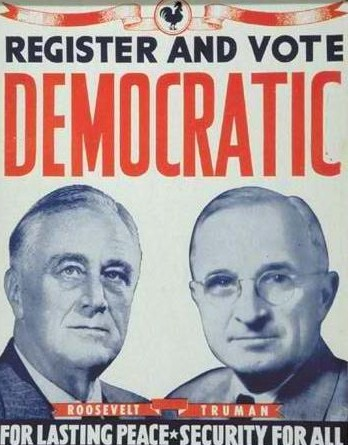
In this 1944 poster, Franklin Roosevelt (left) successfully campaigned for a fourth term. He was the only president who served more than two terms.

At the time of taking office, the President must be:

- a natural-born citizen, or a person recognized as a citizen before September 17, 1787
- at least 35 years of age
- an inhabitant of the United States for at least fourteen years.

A person who meets the above qualifications, however, may still be constitutionally barred from holding the office of president under any of the following conditions:

- Article I, Section 3, Clause 7, gives the U.S. Senate the option of forever disqualifying anyone convicted in an impeachment case from holding any federal office.
- Section 3 of the 14th Amendment prohibits anyone who swore an oath to support the Constitution, and later rebelled against the United States, from becoming president. However, this disqualification can be lifted by a two-thirds vote of each house of Congress.
- The 22nd Amendment prohibits anyone from being elected to the presidency more than twice (or once if the person serves as president or acting president for more than two years of a presidential term to which someone else was originally elected).

=== Clause 6: Vacancy and disability ===
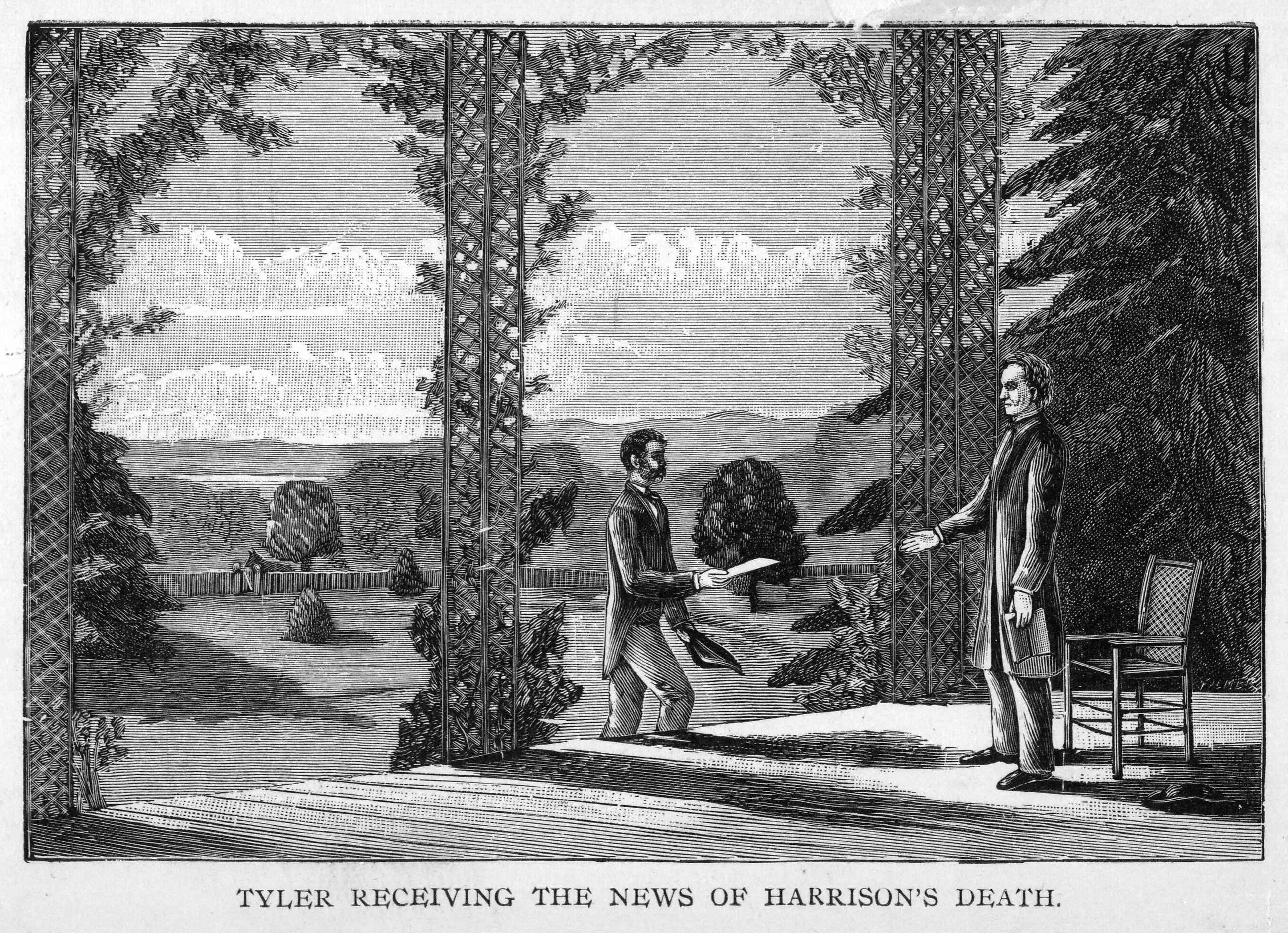
1888 illustration of new President John Tyler receiving the news of President William H. Harrison's death from Chief Clerk of the State Department Fletcher Webster

In Case of the Removal of the President from Office, or of his Death, Resignation, or Inability to discharge the Powers and Duties of the said Office, the Same shall devolve on the Vice President, and the Congress may by Law provide for the Case of Removal, Death, Resignation or Inability, both of the President and Vice President, declaring what Officer shall then act as President, and such Officer shall act accordingly, until the Disability be removed, or a President shall be elected.

(Note: This clause was partially superseded by the 25th Amendment in 1967.)

The wording of this clause caused much controversy at the time it was first used. When William Henry Harrison died in office, a debate arose over whether the vice president would become president, or if he would just inherit the powers, thus becoming an acting president. Harrison's vice president, John Tyler, believed that he had the right to become president. However, many senators argued that he only had the right to assume the powers of the presidency long enough to call for a new election. Because the wording of the clause is so vague, it was impossible for either side to prove its point. Tyler took the Oath of Office as president, setting a precedent that made it possible for later vice presidents to ascend to the presidency unchallenged following the president's death. The "Tyler Precedent" established that if the president dies, resigns or is removed from office, the vice president becomes president.

The Congress may provide for a line of succession beyond the vice president. The current Presidential Succession Act establishes the order as the speaker of the House of Representatives, the president pro tempore of the Senate and then the fifteen Cabinet secretaries in order of each department's establishment. There are concerns regarding the constitutionality of having members of Congress in the line of succession, however, as this clause specifies that only an "officer of the United States" may be designated as a presidential successor. Constitutional scholars from James Madison to the present day have argued that the term "officer" excludes members of Congress.

The 25th Amendment explicitly states that if the president dies, resigns or is removed from office, the vice president becomes president, and also establishes a procedure for filling a vacancy in the office of the vice president. The Amendment further provides that the president, or the vice president and Cabinet, can declare the president unable to discharge his or her duties, in which case the vice president becomes Acting president. If the declaration is done by the vice president and Cabinet, the Amendment permits the president to take control back, unless the vice president and Cabinet challenge the president and two-thirds of both Houses vote to sustain the findings of the vice president and Cabinet. If the declaration is done by the president, the president may take control back without risk of being overridden by the Congress.

=== Clause 7: Salary ===
The President shall, at stated Times, receive for his Services, a Compensation, which shall neither be increased nor diminished during the Period for which he shall have been elected, and he shall not receive within that Period any other Emolument from the United States, or any of them.

The president's salary, currently $400,000 a year, must remain constant throughout the president's term. The president may not receive other compensation from either the federal or any state government.

=== Clause 8: Oath or affirmation ===
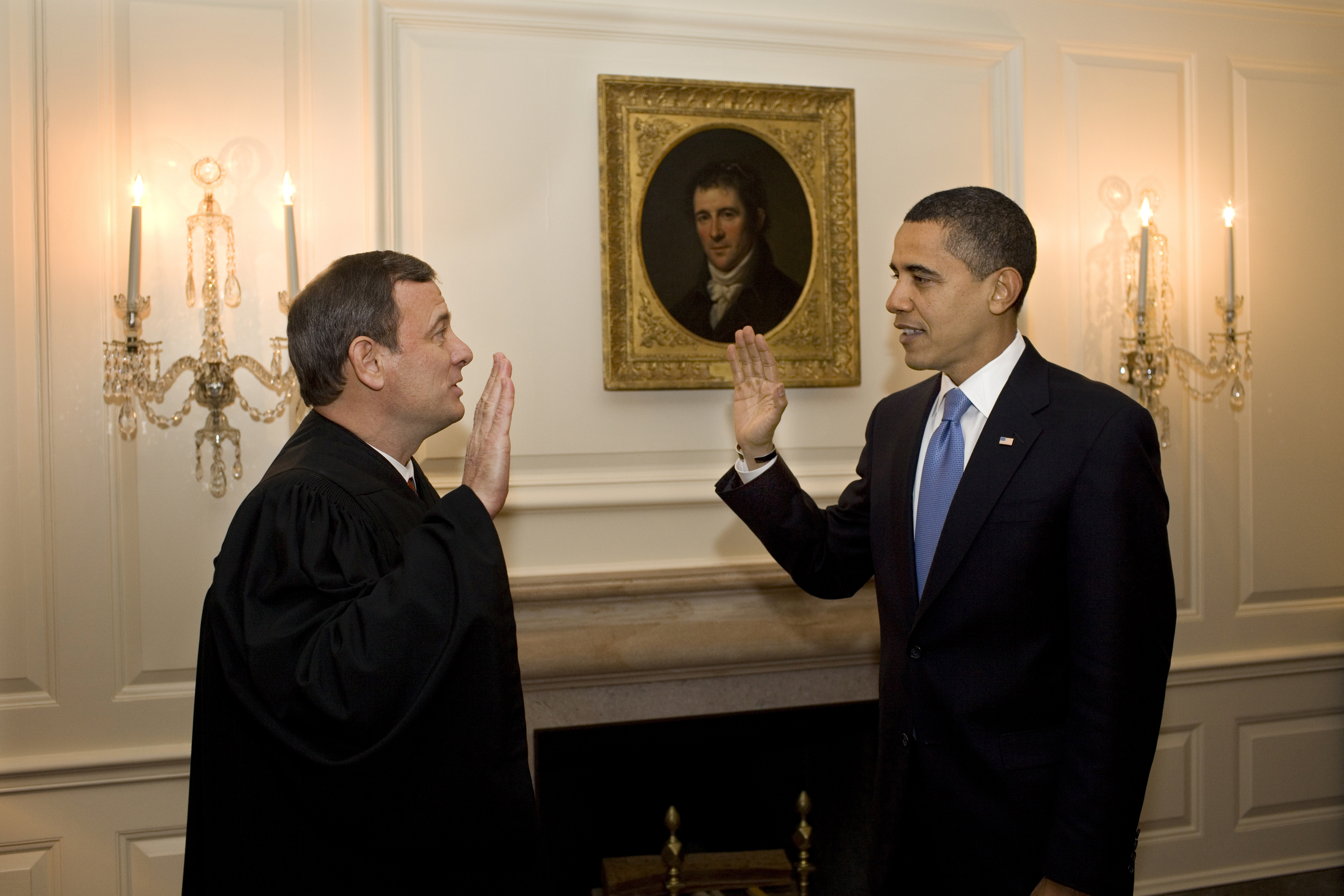
President Barack Obama being administered the oath of office by Chief Justice John Roberts for the second time at his first inauguration, on January 21, 2009

Before he enter on the Execution of his Office, he shall take the following Oath or Affirmation:—"I do solemnly swear (or affirm) that I will faithfully execute the Office of President of the United States, and will to the best of my Ability, preserve, protect and defend the Constitution of the United States."

According to the Joint Congressional Committee on Presidential Inaugurations, George Washington added the words "So help me God" during his first inaugural, though this has been disputed. There are no contemporaneous sources for this fact, and no eyewitness sources to Washington's first inaugural mention the phrase at all—including those that transcribed what he said for his oath.

It is sometimes asserted that the oath bestows upon the president the power to do whatever is necessary to "preserve, protect and defend the Constitution". Andrew Jackson, while vetoing an Act for the renewal of the charter of the national bank, implied that the president could refuse to execute statutes that he felt were unconstitutional. In suspending the privilege of the writ of habeas corpus, President Abraham Lincoln claimed that he acted according to the oath. His action was challenged in court and overturned by the U.S. Circuit Court in Maryland (led by Chief Justice Roger B. Taney) in Ex parte Merryman, 17 F. Cas. 144 (C.C.D. Md. 1861). Lincoln ignored Taney's order. Finally, Andrew Johnson's counsel referred to the theory during his impeachment trial. Otherwise, few have seriously asserted that the oath augments the president's powers.

Traditionally, the chief justice of the United States administers the presidential oath of office, a practice that began with the inauguration of John Adams in 1797, though this is not mandated by the Constitution. Any person with legal authority to administer oaths, such as a judge or a notary public, may swear in a new president. On eight occasions, a person other than the chief justice has administered the oath of office. The most recent president to be sworn in by a non-chief justice was Lyndon B. Johnson, who was swiftly inaugurated as the 36th president in 1963 by district federal judge Sarah T. Hughes, immediately after the assassination of John F. Kennedy.

The vice president also has an oath of office, but it is taken under the Oath or Affirmation Clause of Article VI that provides that "all ... Officers ... of the United States ... shall be bound by Oath or Affirmation, to support this Constitution". Pursuant to Article VI, the 1st United States Congress passed the Oath Administration Act (that remains in effect) which provides that "...the oath or affirmation required by the sixth article of the Constitution of the United States ... shall be administered to [the President of the Senate]". Currently, the vice presidential oath is the same as that for members of Congress and members of the Cabinet, which is as follows:

I do solemnly swear (or affirm) that I will support and defend the Constitution of the United States against all enemies, foreign and domestic; that I will bear true faith and allegiance to the same; that I take this obligation freely, without any mental reservation or purpose of evasion; and that I will well and faithfully discharge the duties of the office on which I am about to enter. So help me God.

== Section 2: Presidential powers ==
In the landmark decision Nixon v. General Services Administration (1977), Justice William Rehnquist, afterwards the chief justice, declared in his dissent "It would require far more of a discourse than could profitably be included in an opinion such as this to fully describe the preeminent position that the president of the United States occupies with respect to our Republic. Suffice it to say that the president is made the sole repository of the executive powers of the United States, and the powers entrusted to him as well as the duties imposed upon him are awesome indeed."

Unlike the modern constitutions of many other countries, which specify when and how a state of emergency may be declared and which rights may be suspended, the U.S. Constitution itself includes no comprehensive separate regime for emergencies. However, according to The Atlantic, some legal scholars believe that the Constitution gives the president inherent emergency powers by making him commander in chief of the armed forces, or by vesting in him a broad, undefined "executive Power". Congress has delegated at least 136 distinct statutory emergency powers to the President, each available upon the declaration of an emergency. Only 13 of these require a declaration from Congress; the remaining 123 are assumed by an executive declaration with no further congressional input. Congressionally-authorized emergency presidential powers are sweeping and dramatic and range from seizing control of the Internet to declaring martial law. This led the magazine The Atlantic to observe that "the misuse of emergency powers is a standard gambit among leaders attempting to consolidate power", because, in the words of Justice Robert H. Jackson's dissent in Korematsu v. United States (1944), the decision that upheld the internment of Japanese Americans, each emergency power "lies about like a loaded weapon, ready for the hand of any authority that can bring forward a plausible claim of an urgent need."

=== Clause 1: Command of military; Opinions of cabinet secretaries; Pardons ===
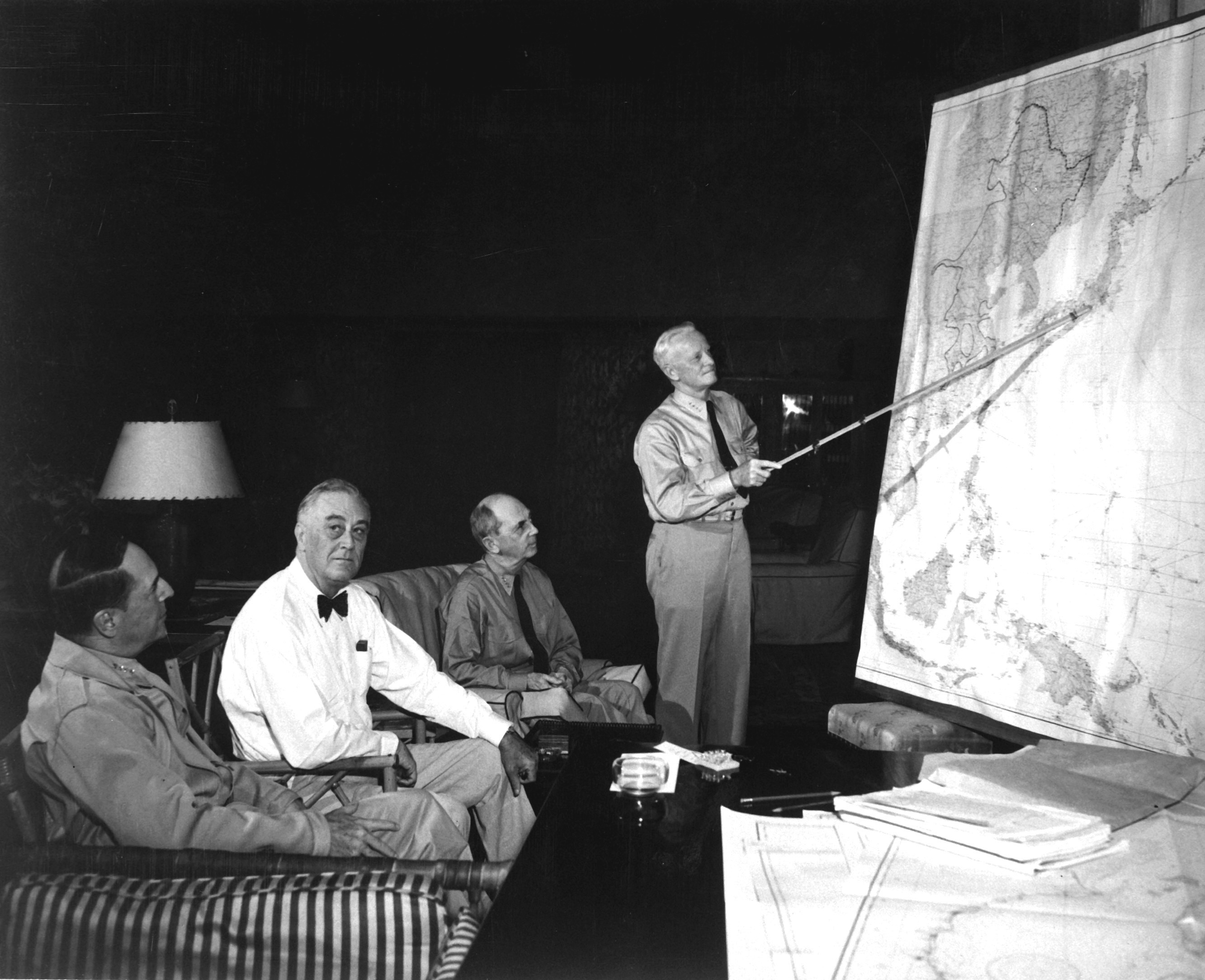
President Franklin D. Roosevelt as commander-in-chief, with his military subordinates during World War II. Left to right: General Douglas MacArthur, President Franklin Roosevelt, Admiral William D. Leahy, Admiral Chester W. Nimitz

The President shall be Commander in Chief of the Army and Navy of the United States, and of the Militia of the several States, when called into the actual Service of the United States; he may require the Opinion, in writing, of the principal Officer in each of the executive Departments, upon any Subject relating to the Duties of their respective Offices, and he shall have Power to grant Reprieves and Pardons for Offences against the United States, except in Cases of Impeachment.

The Constitution vests the president with executive power. The Supreme Court has interpreted that power as reaching its zenith when wielded to protect national security, and ruled that federal courts in the United States must show deference to the executive in assessing threats to the country. The president is the military's commander-in-chief; however, Article One's War Powers Clause gives Congress, and not the president, the exclusive right to declare war. Nevertheless, the power of the president to initiate hostilities has been subject to question. According to historian Thomas Woods, "Ever since the Korean War, Article II, Section 2 [...] has been interpreted 'The president has the power to initiate hostilities without consulting Congress' [....] But what the framers actually meant by that clause was that once war has been declared, it was the president's responsibility as commander-in-chief to direct the war. Alexander Hamilton spoke in such terms when he said that the president, although lacking the power to declare war, would have 'the direction of war when authorized or begun.' The president acting alone was authorized only to repel sudden attacks (hence the decision to withhold from him only the power to 'declare' war, not to 'make' war, which was thought to be a necessary emergency power in case of foreign attack)." Since World War II, major U.S. military engagements, including the Korean War and the Vietnam War, have commenced as "military operations" or under the framework of United Nations "police action". These campaigns or efforts have been justified through Congressional authorizations, such as the Gulf of Tonkin Resolution and the Authorization for Use of Military Force Against Iraq, as well as through United Nations resolutions, providing a basis for their legal legitimacy.

The president may require the "principal officer" of any executive department to tender their advice in writing. While the Constitution nowhere requires a formal Cabinet, it does authorize the president to seek advice from the principal officers of the various departments as they perform their official duties. George Washington found it prudent to organize his principal officers into a Cabinet, and it has been part of the executive branch structure ever since. Presidents have used Cabinet meetings of selected principal officers to widely differing extents and for different purposes. Secretary of State William H. Seward advocated the use of a parliamentary-style Cabinet government to President Abraham Lincoln, but was rebuffed. Later, Woodrow Wilson advocated use of a parliamentary-style Cabinet while he was a professor, but as president he would have none of it in his administration. In recent administrations, cabinets have grown to include key White House staff in addition to department and agency heads. President Ronald Reagan formed seven subcabinet councils to review many policy issues, and subsequent presidents have followed that practice.

Pardons and reprieves may be granted by the president, except in cases of impeachment. There is currently no universally accepted interpretation of the impeachment exception. Some argue that the president simply cannot use a pardon to stop an officeholder from being impeached, while others suggest that crimes underlying an impeachment cannot be pardoned by the president.

As ruled by the Supreme Court in United States v. Wilson (1833), the pardon could be rejected by the convict. Then, in Burdick v. United States (1915), the court specifically said, "Circumstances may be made to bring innocence under the penalties of the law. If so brought, escape by confession of guilt implied in the acceptance of a pardon may be rejected, preferring to be the victim of the law rather than its acknowledged transgressor, preferring death even to such certain infamy."

Commutations (reduction in prison sentence), unlike pardons (restoration of civil rights after prison sentence had been served) may not be refused. In Biddle v. Perovich 274 U.S. 480 (1927), the subject of the commutation did not want to accept life in prison but wanted the death penalty restored. The Supreme Court said, "[a] pardon in our days is not a private act of grace from an individual happening to possess power. It is a part of the Constitutional scheme. When granted it is the determination of the ultimate authority that the public welfare will be better served by inflicting less than what the judgment fixed."

=== Clause 2: Advice and Consent Clause ===
The president exercises the powers in the Advice and Consent Clause with the advice and consent of the Senate.

He shall have Power, by and with the Advice and Consent of the Senate, to make Treaties, provided two thirds of the Senators present concur; and he shall nominate, and by and with the Advice and Consent of the Senate, shall appoint Ambassadors, other public Ministers and Consuls, Judges of the supreme Court, and all other Officers of the United States, whose Appointments are not herein otherwise provided for, and which shall be established by Law: but the Congress may by Law vest the Appointment of such inferior Officers, as they think proper, in the President alone, in the Courts of Law, or in the Heads of Departments.

==== Treaties ====
The president shall have the power to make treaties, with approval of two-thirds of the Senate. In Article II however, the Constitution is not explicit about the termination of treaties. The first abrogation of a treaty occurred in 1798, when Congress passed a law terminating the Treaty of Alliance (1778). In 1854, however, President Franklin Pierce terminated a treaty with Denmark with the consent of the Senate. A Senate committee ruled that it was correct procedure for the president to terminate treaties after being authorized by the Senate. President Pierce's successors, however, returned to the former procedure of obtaining authorization from both Houses. Some Presidents have claimed to themselves the exclusive power of terminating treaties. The first unambiguous case of a President terminating a treaty without authorization, granted prior to or after the termination, occurred when Jimmy Carter terminated a treaty with the Republic of China. For the first time, judicial determination was sought, but the effort proved futile: the Supreme Court could not find a majority agreeing on any particular principle, and therefore instructed the trial court to dismiss the case.

==== Appointments ====
The president may also appoint federal judges, U.S. ambassadors, consuls, ministers, and other officers of the United States with the advice and consent of the Senate. However, Congress may instead legislate for the appointment of particular inferior officials by the president, heads of executive departments, or the courts.

The Senate has a long-standing practice of permitting motions to reconsider previous decisions. In 1931, the Senate granted advice and consent to the president on the appointment of a member of the Federal Power Commission. The officer in question was sworn in, but the Senate, under the guise of a motion to reconsider, rescinded the advice and consent. In the quo warranto proceedings that followed, the Supreme Court ruled that the Senate was not permitted to rescind advice and consent after the officer had been installed.

After the Senate grants advice and consent, however, the Supreme Court has ruled that the president is under no compulsion to commission the officer. It has not been settled whether the president has the prerogative to withhold a commission after having signed it. This issue played a large part in the seminal court case Marbury v. Madison.

At times, the president has asserted the power to remove individuals from office. Congress has often explicitly limited the president's power to remove; during the Reconstruction era, Congress passed the Tenure of Office Act, proscribing, without the advice and consent of the Senate, presidential removal of anyone appointed with the advice and consent of the Senate. President Andrew Johnson ignored the Act, and was later impeached and acquitted. The constitutionality of the Act was not immediately settled. In Myers v. United States, the Supreme Court held that Congress could not limit the president's power to remove an executive officer (the Postmaster General), but in Humphrey's Executor v. United States, it upheld Congress's authority to restrict the president's power to remove officers of the Federal Trade Commission, an "administrative body [that] cannot in any proper sense be characterized as an arm or an eye of the executive."

Congress may repeal the legislation that authorizes the appointment of an executive officer. But according to the Supreme Court, it "cannot reserve for itself the power of an officer charged with the execution of the laws except by impeachment."

=== Clause 3: Recess appointments ===
The President shall have Power to fill up all Vacancies that may happen during the Recess of the Senate, by granting Commissions which shall expire at the End of their next Session.

The president may fill critical federal executive and judicial branch vacancies unilaterally but temporarily when the Senate is in recess, and thus unavailable to provide advice and consent. Such appointments expire at the end of the next Senate session. To continue to serve thereafter, the appointee must be formally nominated by the president and confirmed by the Senate.

== Section 3: Presidential responsibilities ==
He shall from time to time give to the Congress Information of the State of the Union, and recommend to their Consideration such Measures as he shall judge necessary and expedient; he may, on extraordinary Occasions, convene both Houses, or either of them, and in Case of Disagreement between them, with Respect to the Time of Adjournment, he may adjourn them to such Time as he shall think proper; he shall receive Ambassadors and other public Ministers; he shall take Care that the Laws be faithfully executed, and shall Commission all the Officers of the United States.

=== Clause 1: State of the Union ===
The president must give the Congress information on the "State of the Union" "from time to time". This is called the State of the Union Clause. Originally, presidents personally delivered annual addresses to Congress. Thomas Jefferson, who felt that the procedure resembled the speech from the throne delivered by British monarchs, chose instead to send written messages to Congress for reading by clerks. Jefferson's procedure was followed by future presidents until Woodrow Wilson reverted to the former procedure of personally addressing Congress, which has continued to this day.

Kesavan and Sidak explain the purpose of the State of the Union clause:

The State of the Union Clause imposes an executive duty on the president. That duty must be discharged periodically. The president's assessment of the State of the Union must be publicized to Congress, and thus to the nation. The publication of the president's assessment conveys information to Congress—information uniquely gleaned from the president's perspective in his various roles as commander-in-chief, chief law enforcer, negotiator with foreign powers, and the like—that shall aid the legislature in public deliberation on matters that may justify the enactment of legislation because of their national importance.

=== Clause 2: Making recommendations to Congress ===
The president has the power and duty to recommend, for the consideration of Congress, such measures which the president deems as "necessary and expedient". At his inauguration George Washington declared in his Inaugural Address: "By the article establishing the executive department it is made the duty of the president 'to recommend to your consideration such measures as he shall judge necessary and expedient.'" This is the Recommendation Clause.

Kesavan and Sidak explain the purpose of the Recommendation Clause:

The Recommendation Clause also imposes an executive duty on the president. His recommendations respect the equal dignity of Congress and thus embody the anti-royalty sentiment that ignited the American Revolution and subsequently stripped the trappings of monarchy away from the new chief executive. Through his recommendations to Congress, the president speaks collectively for the People as they petition Government for a redress of grievances, and thus his recommendations embody popular sovereignty. The president tailors his recommendations so that their natural implication is the enactment of new legislation, rather than some other action that Congress might undertake. Finally, the president shall have executive discretion to recommend measures of his choosing.

Sidak explained that there is a connection between the Recommendation Clause and the Petition Clause of the 1st Amendment: "Through his performance of the duty to recommend measures to Congress, the president functions as the agent of a diffuse electorate who seek the redress of grievances. To muzzle the president, therefore, is to diminish the effectiveness of this right expressly reserved to the people under the first amendment." Kesavan and Sidak also cited a Professor Bybee who stated in this context: "The Recommendation Clause empowers the president to represent the people before Congress, by recommending measures for the reform of government, for the general welfare, or for the redress of grievances. The Right of Petition Clause prevents Congress from abridging the right of the people to petition for a redress of grievances."

The Recommendation clause imposes a duty, but its performance rests solely with the president. Congress possesses no power to compel the president to recommend, as he alone is the "judge" of what is "necessary and expedient". Unlike the Necessary and Proper Clause of Article I, which limits Congress's discretion to carrying out only its delegated powers, the phrase "necessary and expedient" implies a wider range of discretion for the president. Because this is a political question, there has been little judicial involvement with the president's actions under the clause as long as presidents have not tried to extend their legislative powers. In Youngstown Sheet & Tube Co. v. Sawyer (1952), the Supreme Court noted that the Recommendations Clause serves as a reminder that the president cannot make law by himself: "The power to recommend legislation, granted to the president, serves only to emphasize that it is his function to recommend and that it is the function of the Congress to legislate." The Court made a similar point in striking down the line-item veto in Clinton v. City of New York (1998). When President Bill Clinton attempted to shield the records of the President's Task Force on Health Care Reform as essential to his functions under the Recommendations Clause, a federal circuit court rejected the argument and noted in Association of American Physicians & Surgeons v. Clinton (1993): "[T]he Recommendation Clause is less an obligation than a right. The president has the undisputed authority to recommend legislation, but he need not exercise that authority with respect to any particular subject or, for that matter, any subject."

=== Clause 3: Extraordinary sessions and prorogation of Congress ===
To allow the government to act quickly in case of a major domestic or international crisis arising when Congress is not in session, the president is empowered to call a special session of one or both houses of Congress. Since John Adams first did so in 1797, the president has called the full Congress to convene for a special session on 27 occasions. Harry Truman was the most recent to do so in July 1948 (the so called "Turnip Day Session"). Additionally, prior to ratification of the Twentieth Amendment (which brought forward the date on which Congress convenes from March to January) in 1933, newly inaugurated presidents would routinely call the Senate to meet to confirm nominations or ratify treaties. Clause 3 also authorizes the president to prorogue Congress if the House and Senate cannot agree on the time of adjournment; no president has ever had to exercise this administrative power. In 2020, President Donald Trump threatened to use this clause as a justification to prorogue both houses of Congress in order to make recess appointments during the COVID-19 pandemic; however, the president does not have the authority to do so unless either the Senate or the House of Representatives were to alter their scheduled adjournment dates.

=== Clause 4: Receiving foreign representatives ===
The president receives all foreign ambassadors. This clause of the Constitution, known as the Reception Clause, has been interpreted to imply that the president possesses broad power over matters of foreign policy, and to provide support for the president's exclusive authority to grant recognition to a foreign government.

=== Clause 5: Caring for the faithful execution of the law ===
The president must "take care that the laws be faithfully executed". This clause in the Constitution imposes a duty on the president to enforce the laws of the United States and is called the Take Care Clause, also known as the Faithful Execution Clause or Faithfully Executed Clause. This clause is meant to ensure that a law is faithfully executed by the president even if he disagrees with the purpose of that law. Addressing the North Carolina ratifying convention, William Maclaine declared that the Faithful Execution Clause was "one of the [Constitution's] best provisions". If the president "takes care to see the laws faithfully executed, it will be more than is done in any government on the continent; for I will venture to say that our government, and those of the other states, are, with respect to the execution of the laws, in many respects mere ciphers." President George Washington interpreted this clause as imposing on him a unique duty to ensure the execution of federal law. Discussing a tax rebellion, Washington observed, "it is my duty to see the Laws executed: to permit them to be trampled upon with impunity would be repugnant to [that duty]."

According to former United States assistant attorney general Walter E. Dellinger III, the Supreme Court and the attorneys general have long interpreted the Take Care Clause to mean that the president has no inherent constitutional authority to suspend the enforcement of the laws, particularly of statutes. The Take Care Clause demands that the president obey the law, the Supreme Court said in Humphrey's Executor v. United States, and repudiates any notion that he may dispense with the law's execution. In Printz v. United States, the Supreme Court explained how the president executes the law: "The Constitution does not leave to speculation who is to administer the laws enacted by Congress; the president, it says, 'shall take Care that the Laws be faithfully executed,' Art. II, §3, personally and through officers whom he appoints (save for such inferior officers as Congress may authorize to be appointed by the 'Courts of Law' or by 'the Heads of Departments' with other presidential appointees), Art. II, §2."

The president may not prevent a member of the executive branch from performing a ministerial duty lawfully imposed upon him by Congress. (See Marbury v. Madison (1803); and Kendall v. United States ex rel. Stokes (1838).) Nor may the president take an action not authorized either by the Constitution or by a lawful statute. (See Youngstown Sheet & Tube Co. v. Sawyer (1952).) Finally, the president may not refuse to enforce a constitutional law, or "cancel" certain appropriations, for that would amount to an extra-constitutional veto or suspension power.

Some presidents have claimed the authority under this clause to impound money appropriated by Congress. President Jefferson, for example, delayed the expenditure of money appropriated for the purchase of gunboats for over a year. President Franklin D. Roosevelt and his successors sometimes refused outright to expend appropriated money. The Supreme Court, however, has held that impoundments without Congressional authorization are unconstitutional.

It has been asserted that the president's responsibility in the "faithful" execution of the laws entitles him to suspend the privilege of the writ of habeas corpus. Article One provides that the privilege may not be suspended save during times of rebellion or invasion, but it does not specify who may suspend the privilege. The Supreme Court ruled that Congress may suspend the privilege if it deems it necessary. During the American Civil War, President Abraham Lincoln suspended the privilege, but, owing to the vehement opposition he faced, obtained congressional authorization for the same. Since then, the privilege of the writ has only been suspended upon the express authorization of Congress, except in the case of Mary Surratt, whose writ was suspended by President Andrew Johnson regarding her alleged involvement in the assassination of President Lincoln.

In Mississippi v. Johnson, 71 U.S. 475 (1867), the Supreme Court ruled that the judiciary may not restrain the president in the execution of the laws. In that case the Supreme Court refused to entertain a request for an injunction preventing President Andrew Johnson from executing the Reconstruction Acts, which were claimed to be unconstitutional. The Court found that "[t]he Congress is the legislative department of the government; the president is the executive department. Neither can be restrained in its action by the judicial department; though the acts of both, when performed, are, in proper cases, subject to its cognizance." Thus, the courts cannot bar the passage of a law by Congress, though it may later strike down such a law as unconstitutional. A similar construction applies to the executive branch.

=== Clause 6: Officers' commissions ===
The president commissions "all the Officers of the United States". These include officers in both military and foreign service. (Under Article I, Section 8, the States have authority for "the Appointment of the Officers ... of the [State] Militia ...")

The presidential authority to commission officers had a large impact on the 1803 case Marbury v. Madison, where outgoing Federalist president John Adams feverishly signed many commissions to the judiciary on his final day in office, hoping to, as incoming Democratic-Republican president Thomas Jefferson put it, "[retire] into the judiciary as a stronghold". However, in his haste, Adams' secretary of State neglected to have all the commissions delivered. Incoming President Jefferson was enraged with Adams, and ordered his secretary of State, James Madison, to refrain from delivering the remaining commissions. William Marbury took the matter to the Supreme Court, where it held that the commissions were valid, and the courts generally had the power to order them delivered and should have done so (a ruling that established the principle of judicial review in the United States), but refused to issue the orders itself on the grounds that the law giving it original jurisdiction over such cases was unconstitutional.

== Section 4: Impeachment and removal from office of federal officials ==
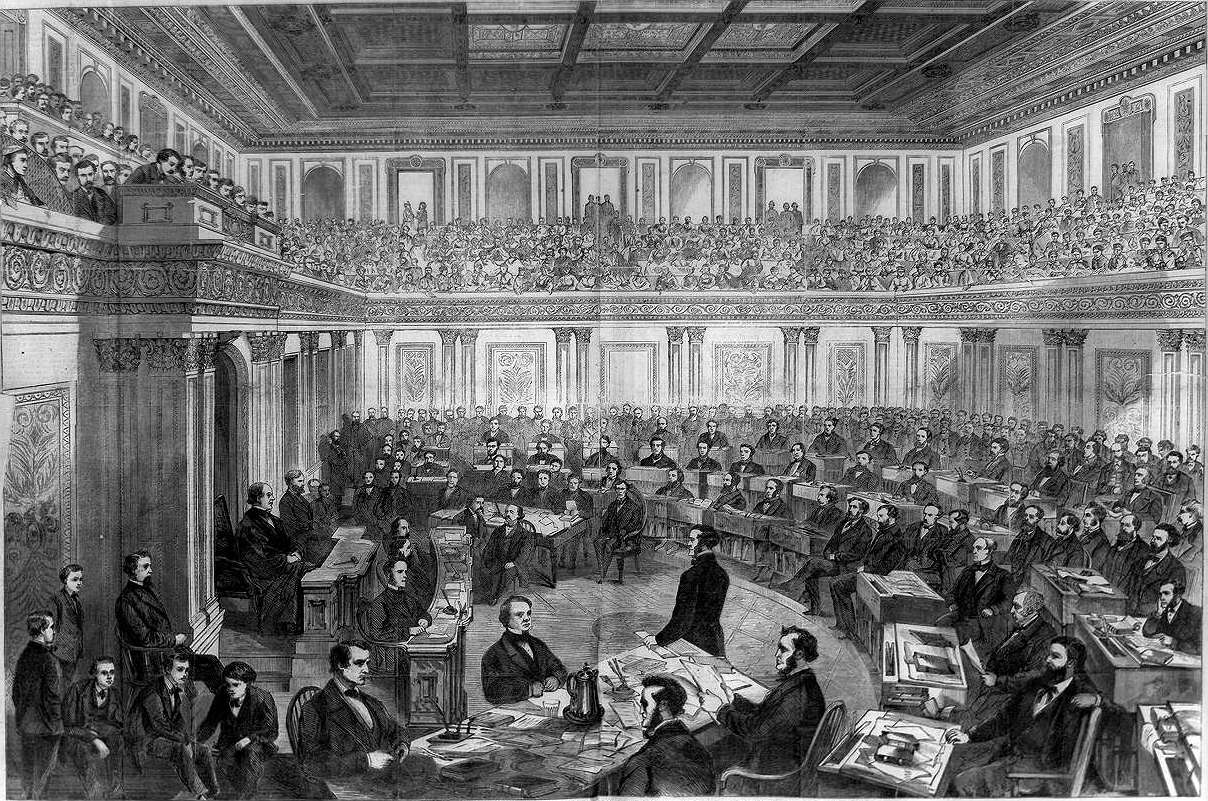
Depiction of the impeachment trial of President Andrew Johnson in 1868, with Chief Justice Salmon P. Chase presiding

The President, Vice President and all civil Officers of the United States, shall be removed from Office on Impeachment for, and Conviction of, Treason, Bribery, or other high Crimes and Misdemeanors.

The Constitution also allows for involuntary removal from office of the president, vice president, Cabinet secretaries, and other executive officers, as well as judges, who may be impeached by the House of Representatives and tried in the Senate.

Any official convicted by the Senate is immediately removed from office, and to prevent the president's Article II appointment power from being used as a de facto pardon the Senate may also vote by a simple majority that the removed official be forever disqualified from holding any future office under the United States. Constitutional law expert Senator Matthew Carpenter reported that without the permanent disqualification clause impeachment would have no effect, because the President could simply reinstate his impeached officers "the next morning".

While no other punishments may be inflicted pursuant to the impeachment proceeding, the convicted party remains liable to trial and punishment in the courts for civil and criminal charges.

== See also ==
- Unitary executive theory
