= List of United States Supreme Court cases, volume 38 =

Supreme Court of the United States
- Interactive map of Supreme Court of the United States
- 38°53′26″N 77°00′16″W
- Established: March 4, 1789; 237 years ago
- Location: Washington, D.C.
- Coordinates: 38°53′26″N 77°00′16″W
- Composition method: Presidential nomination with Senate confirmation
- Authorised by: Constitution of the United States, Art. III, § 1
- Judge term length: life tenure, subject to impeachment and removal
- Number of positions: 9 (by statute)
- Website: supremecourt.gov

This is a list of cases reported in volume 38 (13 Pet.) of United States Reports, decided by the Supreme Court of the United States in 1839.

== Nominative reports ==
In 1874, the U.S. government created the United States Reports, and retroactively numbered older privately-published case reports as part of the new series. As a result, cases appearing in volumes 1–90 of U.S. Reports have dual citation forms; one for the volume number of U.S. Reports, and one for the volume number of the reports named for the relevant reporter of decisions (these are called "nominative reports").

=== Richard Peters, Jr. ===
Starting with the 26th volume of U.S. Reports, the Reporter of Decisions of the Supreme Court of the United States was Richard Peters, Jr. Peters was Reporter of Decisions from 1828 to 1843, covering volumes 26 through 41 of United States Reports which correspond to volumes 1 through 16 of his Peters's Reports. As such, the dual form of citation to, for example, Anthony v. Butler is 38 U.S. (13 Pet.) 423 (1839).

== Justices of the Supreme Court at the time of 38 U.S. (13 Pet.) ==
The Supreme Court is established by Article III, Section 1 of the Constitution of the United States, which says: "The judicial Power of the United States, shall be vested in one supreme Court . . .". The size of the Court is not specified; the Constitution leaves it to Congress to set the number of justices. Under the Judiciary Act of 1789 Congress originally fixed the number of justices at six (one chief justice and five associate justices). Since 1789 Congress has varied the size of the Court from six to seven, nine, ten, and back to nine justices (always including one chief justice).

When the cases in 38 U.S. (13 Pet.) were decided, the Court comprised these nine justices:

Portrait	Justice	Office	Home State	Succeeded	Date confirmed by the Senate (Vote)	Tenure on Supreme Court
	Roger B. Taney	Chief Justice	Maryland	John Marshall	March 15, 1836 (29–15)	March 28, 1836 – October 12, 1864 (Died)
	Joseph Story	Associate Justice	Massachusetts	William Cushing	November 18, 1811 (Acclamation)	February 3, 1812 – September 10, 1845 (Died)
	Smith Thompson	Associate Justice	New York	Henry Brockholst Livingston	December 9, 1823 (Acclamation)	September 1, 1823 – December 18, 1843 (Died)
	John McLean	Associate Justice	Ohio	Robert Trimble	March 7, 1829 (Acclamation)	January 11, 1830 – April 4, 1861 (Died)
	Henry Baldwin	Associate Justice	Pennsylvania	Bushrod Washington	January 6, 1830 (41–2)	January 18, 1830 – April 21, 1844 (Died)
	James Moore Wayne	Associate Justice	Georgia	William Johnson	January 9, 1835 (Acclamation)	January 14, 1835 – July 5, 1867 (Died)
	Philip P. Barbour	Associate Justice	Virginia	Gabriel Duvall	March 15, 1836 (30–11)	May 12, 1836 – February 25, 1841 (Died)
	John Catron	Associate Justice	Tennessee	newly created seat	March 8, 1837 (28–15)	May 1, 1837 – May 30, 1865 (Died)
	John McKinley	Associate Justice	Alabama	newly created seat	September 25, 1837 (Acclamation)	January 9, 1838 – July 19, 1852 (Died)

== Citation style ==
Under the Judiciary Act of 1789 the federal court structure at the time comprised District Courts, which had general trial jurisdiction; Circuit Courts, which had mixed trial and appellate (from the US District Courts) jurisdiction; and the United States Supreme Court, which had appellate jurisdiction over the federal District and Circuit courts—and for certain issues over state courts. The Supreme Court also had limited original jurisdiction (i.e., in which cases could be filed directly with the Supreme Court without first having been heard by a lower federal or state court). There were one or more federal District Courts and/or Circuit Courts in each state, territory, or other geographical region.

Bluebook citation style is used for case names, citations, and jurisdictions.

- "C.C.D." = United States Circuit Court for the District of . . .
  - e.g.,"C.C.D.N.J." = United States Circuit Court for the District of New Jersey
- "D." = United States District Court for the District of . . .
  - e.g.,"D. Mass." = United States District Court for the District of Massachusetts
- "E." = Eastern; "M." = Middle; "N." = Northern; "S." = Southern; "W." = Western
  - e.g.,"C.C.S.D.N.Y." = United States Circuit Court for the Southern District of New York
  - e.g.,"M.D. Ala." = United States District Court for the Middle District of Alabama
- "Ct. Cl." = United States Court of Claims
- The abbreviation of a state's name alone indicates the highest appellate court in that state's judiciary at the time.
  - e.g.,"Pa." = Supreme Court of Pennsylvania
  - e.g.,"Me." = Supreme Judicial Court of Maine

== List of cases in 38 U.S. (13 Pet.) ==
Case Name	Page and year	Opinion of the Court	Concurring opinion(s)	Dissenting opinion(s)	Lower Court	Disposition
Woodward v. Brown	1 (1839)	McLean	none	none	C.C.D.C.	affirmed
Whiting v. Second Bank of the United States	6 (1839)	Story	none	none	C.C.D. Ky.	affirmed
van Ness v. Second Bank of the United States	17 (1839)	Taney	none	none	C.C.D.C.	affirmed
Rhode Island v. Massachusetts	23 (1839)	Taney	none	none	original	motion denied
Smith v. Richards	26 (1839)	Barbour	none	Story	C.C.S.D.N.Y.	affirmed
Ross v. Duval	45 (1839)	McLean	none	none	C.C.E.D. Va.	reversed
Andrews v. Pond	65 (1839)	Taney	none	none	C.C.S.D. Ala.	reversed
United States v. Levy	81 (1839)	Wayne	none	none	C.C.D. Ky.	affirmed
United States v. Drummond	84 (1839)	Wayne	none	none	Fla. Super Ct.	reversed
United States v. Burgevin	85 (1839)	Wayne	none	none	Fla. Super Ct.	reversed
United States v. Arredondo's Heirs I	88 (1839)	Wayne	none	none	Fla. Super Ct.	affirmed
Bradley v. The Washington, Alexandria and Georgetown Steam Packet Company	89 (1839)	Barbour	none	Thompson; Catron; Story	C.C.D.C.	reversed
Second Bank of the United States v. Lee	107 (1839)	Catron	none	none	C.C.D.C.	affirmed
Second Bank of the United States v. Peter	123 (1839)	McLean	none	none	C.C.D.C.	reversed
King v. Thompson	128 (1839)	Catron	none	none	C.C.D.C.	multiple
United States v. Arredondo's Heirs II	133 (1839)	Wayne	none	none	Fla. Super Ct.	affirmed
Wallace v. M'Connell	136 (1839)	Thompson	none	none	S.D. Ala.	affirmed
Reed's Lessee v. Marsh	153 (1839)	Taney	none	none	Ohio	dismissed
Ocean Insurance Company v. Polleys	157 (1839)	Story	none	none	Me.	dismissed
Walker v. Parker	166 (1839)	McLean	none	none	C.C.D.C.	affirmed
United States v. Hardyman	176 (1839)	McLean	none	none	C.C.E.D. Va.	certification
Stokes v. Saltonstall	181 (1839)	Barbour	none	none	C.C.D. Md.	affirmed
Clark v. Smith	195 (1839)	Catron	none	none	C.C.D. Ky.	reversed
Downes and Company v. Church	205 (1839)	Story	none	none	C.C.D. Miss.	certification
Stein v. Bowman	209 (1839)	McLean	none	Baldwin	E.D. La.	reversed
Ex parte Hennen	225 (1839)	Taney	none	none	C.C.D. La.	mandamus denied
Bend v. Hoyt	263 (1839)	Story	none	none	C.C.S.D.N.Y.	certification
Ex parte Hoyt	279 (1839)	Story	Baldwin	none	S.D.N.Y.	mandamus denied
Hardy v. Hoyt	292 (1839)	Story	none	none	C.C.S.D.N.Y.	certification
Van Ness v. Hyatt	294 (1839)	Barbour	none	none	C.C.D.C.	affirmed
Moore v. Bank of the Metropolis	302 (1839)	Thompson	none	none	C.C.D.C.	affirmed
M'Elmoyle ex rel. Bailey v. Cohen	312 (1839)	Wayne	none	none	C.C.D. Ga.	certification
Columbian Insurance Company v. Ashby	331 (1839)	Story	none	none	C.C.D.C.	affirmed
Moncure v. Dermott	345 (1839)	McKinley	none	none	C.C.D.C.	reversed
Story v. Livingston	359 (1839)	Wayne	none	none	E.D. La.	affirmed
Wilcox v. Hunt	378 (1839)	McKinley	none	none	E.D. La.	affirmed
Lupton v. Janney	381 (1839)	Story	none	none	C.C.D.C.	affirmed
The Brig Sarah Ann	387 (1839)	Wayne	none	none	C.C.D. Mass.	affirmed
Ex parte Whitney	404 (1839)	Story	none	none	E.D. La.	mandamus denied
Emerson's Heirs v. Hall	409 (1839)	McLean	none	none	La.	reversed
Williams v. Suffolk Insurance Company	415 (1839)	McLean	none	none	C.C.D. Mass.	certification
Anthony v. Butler	423 (1839)	McLean	none	none	C.C.D.R.I.	affirmed
Bagnell v. Broderick	436 (1839)	Catron	none	McLean	C.C.D. Mo.	affirmed
Keene v. Whittaker	459 (1839)	Wayne	none	none	E.D. La.	dismissed
Carr v. Hoxie	460 (1839)	Story	none	none	C.C.D.R.I.	dismissed
Burton v. Smith	464 (1839)	Barbour	none	none	C.C.E.D. Va.	affirmed
Meredith v. United States	486 (1839)	Story	none	none	C.C.D. Md.	affirmed
Wilcox v. Jackson	498 (1839)	Barbour	none	none	Ill.	reversed
Bank of Augusta v. Earle	519 (1839)	Taney	Baldwin	McKinley	C.C.S.D. Ala.	reversed

== See also ==
- Certificate of division
