= Judicial Vesting Clause =

Executive power of the federal government belongs to the U.S. President

The Judicial Vesting Clause (Article III, Section 1, Clause 1) of the United States Constitution bestows the judicial power of the United States federal government to the Supreme Court of the United States and in the inferior courts of the federal judiciary of the United States. Similar clauses are found in Article I and Article II; the former bestows federal legislative power exclusively to the Congress of the United States, and the latter grants executive power solely to the President of the United States. These three clauses together secure a separation of powers among the three branches of the federal government, and individually, each one entrenches checks and balances on the operation and power of the other two branches.

== Text ==
The judicial Power of the United States, shall be vested in one supreme Court, and in such inferior Courts as the Congress may from time to time ordain and establish.

== See also ==
- List of clauses of the United States Constitution
