= Oversight =

Oversight may refer to:

== Governance ==
- Regulation – rulemaking
- Separation of powers in state governance (checks and balances) - the concept of separate branches of government or agencies exercising authority over one another
- Checks and controls over a particular body or institution:

- Congressional oversight over U.S. federal agencies and other institutions, exercised by the United States Congress
- The ministry of episcopal oversight within Christian churches
- Oversight over the International Federation of Accountants (IFAC), see Public Interest Oversight Board
- Oversight (registration, inspection, standard setting and enforcement) over auditors, see Public Company Accounting Oversight Board
- Internal oversight over United Nations operations, see United Nations Office of Internal Oversight Services

- An element of organizational governance, see Fair governance

== Sports ==
- Oversight (horse), a French Thoroughbred racehorse
