= Executive Vesting Clause =

Executive power of the federal government belongs to the U.S. President

The Executive Vesting Clause (Article II, Section 1, Clause 1) of the United States Constitution says that "the executive power shall be vested" in a President of the United States who shall hold the office for a term of four years. Similar vesting clauses are found in Article I and Article III; the former bestows federal legislative power exclusively to the United States Congress, and the latter grants judicial power solely to the United States Supreme Court, and other federal courts established by law. These three clauses together secure a separation of powers among the three branches of the federal government, and individually, each one entrenches checks and balances on the operation and power of the other two branches.

== Text ==
The executive Power shall be vested in a President of the United States of America. He shall hold his Office during the Term of four Years, and, together with the Vice-President chosen for the same Term, be elected, as follows:[...]

== See also ==
- List of clauses of the United States Constitution
- Unitary executive theory
