= List of the youngest state legislators in the United States =

This is a list of the youngest individuals (i.e. less than 25 years old) elected or appointed to a state legislature in the United States.

== Overview ==
In 2014, the National Conference of State Legislatures estimated that 5% of state legislators were under the age of 30.

== List ==
Exact age unknown

Name	Image	State	Political party	Date of birth	Age upon taking office	Tenure	Notes
Lilian Hale		Washington	Republican	Mar 7, 2006	18 years, 0 days	Mar 7, 2024 – Mar 8, 2024	Temporarily succeeding her stepfather Joel McEntire.
Saira Blair		West Virginia	Republican	Jul 11, 1996	18 years, 143 days	Dec 1, 2014 – Dec 1, 2018	Daughter of Craig Blair.
Valerie McDonnell		New Hampshire	Republican	May 25, 2004	18 years, 196 days	Dec 7, 2022 – present	
Derrick Seaver		Ohio	Democratic	Feb 6, 1982	18 years, 332 days	Jan 3, 2001 – Dec 31, 2006	Switched to the Republican Party in November 2004.
Derrick Seaver		Ohio	Republican	Feb 6, 1982	18 years, 332 days	Jan 3, 2001 – Dec 31, 2006	Switched to the Republican Party in November 2004.
Jacob Bachmeier		Montana	Democratic	Jan 29, 1998	18 years, 339 days	Jan 2, 2017 – Jan 4, 2021	
James Thibualt		New Hampshire	Republican	December 27, 2005	18 years, 343 days	Dec 4, 2024 – present	Youngest state legislator in the United States.
Dawson Holle		North Dakota	Republican	Nov 25, 2003	19 years, 6 days	Dec 1, 2022 – present	
Tony Labranche		New Hampshire	Democratic	Nov 11, 2001	19 years, 22 days	Dec 3, 2020 – Aug 8, 2022	Left the Democratic Party in January 2022.
Tony Labranche		New Hampshire	Independent	Nov 11, 2001	19 years, 22 days	Dec 3, 2020 – Aug 8, 2022	Left the Democratic Party in January 2022.
Joe Sweeney		New Hampshire	Republican	Nov 8, 1993	19 years, 27 days	Dec 5, 2012 – present	
Josh Holstein		West Virginia	Republican	Nov 2, 2001	19 years, 29 days	Dec 1, 2020 – present	
Caleb Hanna		West Virginia	Republican	Oct 29, 1999	19 years, 33 days	Dec 1, 2018 – Jan 2, 2024	Youngest-ever African-American state legislator.
Rio Tilton		New Hampshire	Republican	Jun 15, 1996	19 years, 51 days	Aug 5, 2015 – Dec 5, 2018	
Mallerie Stromswold		Montana	Republican	Oct 29, 2001	19 years, 67 days	Jan 4, 2021 – Jan 17, 2023	
Maureen Manning		New Hampshire	Democratic	Sep 12, 1961	19 years, 82 days	Dec 3, 1980 – Dec 3, 1986	
Brian Poznanski		New Hampshire	Democratic	Jul 31, 1989	19 years, 125 days	Dec 3, 2008 – Dec 1, 2010	
Kevin H. Smith		New Hampshire	Republican	Jul 28, 1977	19 years, 129 days	Dec 4, 1996 – Dec 2, 1998	Later candidate for governor (2012), town manager of Londonderry (2013–2022) and candidate for U.S. senator (2022).
Jack Uhde		Montana	Democratic	Aug 27, 1957	19 years, 129 days	Jan 3, 1977 – Jan 5, 1981	At the time the youngest-ever Montana state representative.
Yvonne Dean-Bailey		New Hampshire	Republican	Dec 1, 1995	19 years, 169 days	May 19, 2015 – Apr 19, 2018	
Lukas Schubert		Montana	Republican	Jul 20, 2005	19 years, 170 days	Jan 6, 2025 – present	
James E. Wheeler		New Hampshire	Republican	June 1, 1983	19 years, 186 days	Dec 4, 2002 – Dec 6, 2006	Youngest-ever New Hampshire legislator and son of Dave Wheeler.
Stephen Duprey		New Hampshire	Republican	Jun 1, 1953	19 years, 188 days	Dec 6, 1972 – Dec 1, 1976	Later chair of the state Republican Party (1997–2001).
Michael Elconin		Wisconsin	Democratic	Jun 20, 1953	19 years, 195 days	Jan 1, 1973 – Jan 3, 1977	
Dennis Ruprecht		New Hampshire	Democratic	May 15, 1999	19 years, 204 days	Dec 5, 2018 – Dec 17, 2021	
Kalan Haywood		Wisconsin	Democratic	Jun 5, 1999	19 years, 216 days	Jan 7, 2019 – present	
Cassandra Levesque		New Hampshire	Democratic	May 3, 1999	19 years, 216 days	Dec 5, 2018 – present	
Alison Conn		Montana	Republican	May 21, 1961	19 years, 229 days	Jan 5, 1981 – Jan 3, 1983	At the time the youngest-ever Republican legislator.
Scott Merrick		New Hampshire	Democratic	Mar 29, 1985	19 years, 247 days	Dec 1, 2004 – Oct 2009	
Michael Weeden		New Hampshire	Republican	Mar 11, 1991	19 years, 265 days	Dec 1, 2010 – Dec 5, 2012	
Thomas R. Lussier		Massachusetts	Democratic	Apr 5, 1957	19 years, 275 days	Jan 5, 1977 – Jan 1, 1985	Youngest-ever Massachusetts legislator.
Jonah Wheeler		New Hampshire	Democratic	Mar 1, 2003	19 years, 281 days	Dec 7, 2022 – present	
Jeffrey Fontas		New Hampshire	Democratic	Jan 14, 1987	19 years, 326 days	Dec 6, 2006 – Dec 3, 2008	
Dave Pine		New Hampshire	Democratic	Dec 22, 1958	19 years, 349 days	Dec 6, 1978 – Dec 3, 1980	
Andrew Edwards		New Hampshire	Democratic	1987	19 years	Dec 6, 2006 – Dec 3, 2008	
Kyle Jones		New Hampshire	Republican	1991	19 years	Dec 1, 2010 – Dec 5, 2012	Son of Laura Jones.
Gregory Reed		Vermont	Republican	1953	19 years	Jan 3, 1973 – [?]	
Jay Lucas		New Hampshire	Republican	Oct 18, 1954	20 years, 47 days	Dec 4, 1974 – Dec 6, 1978	Later nominee for governor (1998).
Nicholas Kettle		Rhode Island	Republican	Oct 18, 1990	20 years, 79 days	Jan 5, 2011 – Feb 22, 2018	Youngest-ever Rhode Island state senator.
Jesse Laslovich		Montana	Democratic	Oct 3, 1980	20 years, 92 days	Jan 3, 2001 – Jan 3, 2005	Later state senator (2005–2010).
Homer Paul		Oklahoma	Democratic	Aug 4, 1904	20 years, 107 days	Nov 17, 1926 – Nov 19, 1930	Later state senator (1932–1948) and state senate president pro tempore (1945–1947).
Aaron Coleman		Kansas	Democratic	Sep 20, 2000	20 years, 113 days	Jan 11, 2021 – Jan 9, 2023	Left the Democratic Party from January to February 2021. Suspended from the party in February 2022.
Aaron Coleman		Kansas	Independent	Sep 20, 2000	20 years, 113 days	Jan 11, 2021 – Jan 9, 2023	Left the Democratic Party from January to February 2021. Suspended from the party in February 2022.
Joshua Higginbotham		West Virginia	Republican	Jul 23, 1996	20 years, 131 days	Dec 1, 2016 – Nov 5, 2021	
James Davis		Iowa	Whig	Jul 20, 1826	20 years, 133 days	Nov 30, 1846 – Dec 3, 1848	
John Breckinridge		Virginia	Independent	Dec 2, 1760	20 years, 177 days	May 28, 1781 – May 1782, May 5, 1783 – Oct 17, 1785	Later U.S. representative-elect (1792, did not serve), attorney general of Kentucky (1793–1797), Kentucky state representative (1798–1800), speaker of the Kentucky House (1799–1800), U.S. senator (1801–1805) and U.S. attorney general (1805–1806). Joined the Democratic-Republican Party.
Aundre Bumgardner		Connecticut	Republican	Jul 5, 1994	20 years, 186 days	Jan 7, 2015 – Jan 4, 2017; Jan 4, 2023 – present	Switched to the Democratic Party in 2018.
Aundre Bumgardner		Connecticut	Democratic	Jul 5, 1994	20 years, 186 days	Jan 7, 2015 – Jan 4, 2017; Jan 4, 2023 – present	Switched to the Democratic Party in 2018.
Elias Coop-Gonzalez		West Virginia	Republican	May 2, 2002	20 years, 213 days	Dec 1, 2022 – present	
Joseph Stallcop		New Hampshire	Democratic	May 7, 1996	20 years, 214 days	Dec 7, 2016 – Aug 6, 2018	Switched to the Libertarian Party in May 2017.
Joseph Stallcop		New Hampshire	Libertarian	May 7, 1996	20 years, 214 days	Dec 7, 2016 – Aug 6, 2018	Switched to the Libertarian Party in May 2017.
Caleb Q. Dyer		New Hampshire	Republican	May 5, 1996	20 years, 216 days	Dec 7, 2016 – Dec 4, 2018	Switched to the Libertarian Party in February 2017.
Caleb Q. Dyer		New Hampshire	Libertarian	May 5, 1996	20 years, 216 days	Dec 7, 2016 – Dec 4, 2018	Switched to the Libertarian Party in February 2017.
Braxton Mitchell		Montana	Republican	May 20, 2000	20 years, 229 days	Jan 4, 2021 – present	
David Stone		North Carolina	Independent	Feb 17, 1770	20 years, 257 days	Nov 1, 1790 – Feb 7, 1795, Nov 18, 1811 – Dec 25, 1812	Later U.S. representative (1799–1801), U.S. senator (1801–1807, 1813–1814) and governor (1808–1810).
David Stone		North Carolina	Democratic-Republican	Feb 17, 1770	20 years, 257 days	Nov 1, 1790 – Feb 7, 1795, Nov 18, 1811 – Dec 25, 1812	Later U.S. representative (1799–1801), U.S. senator (1801–1807, 1813–1814) and governor (1808–1810).
William R. King		North Carolina	Democratic-Republican	Apr 7, 1786	20 years, 269 days	Jan 1, 1807 – Jan 1, 1809	Vice president of the United States (1853)
D.J. Bettencourt		New Hampshire	Republican	Jan 6, 1984	20 years, 330 days	Dec 1, 2004 – May 27, 2012	Later House majority leader (2010–2012). Youngest majority leader in New Hampshire history.
Michael J. Obuchowski		Vermont	Democratic	Feb 4, 1952	20 years, 334 days	Jan 3, 1973 – Jan 2011	Later speaker of the state House (1995–2001).
Harold W. Giard		Vermont	Democratic	Feb 1, 1952	20 years, 337 days	Jan 3, 1973 – Jan 7, 1981	Later state senator (2005–2013).
Kevin Soucie		Wisconsin	Democratic	Feb 2, 1954	20 years, 338 days	Jan 6, 1975 – Jan 3, 1981	
Shaun Doherty		New Hampshire	Republican	Dec 19, 1987	20 years, 350 days	Dec 3, 2008 – Dec 5, 2012	
Karen Swanson		Massachusetts	Democratic	Jan 15, 1954	20 years, 351 days	Jan 1, 1975 – July 12, 1978	
Joseph Lane		Indiana	Democratic	Dec 14, 1801	20 years, 353 days	Dec 2, 1822 – 1823, 1830 – 1833, 1838 – 1839	Later state senator (1839–1840, 1844–1846), governor of Oregon Territory (1849–1850, 1853), delegate to the U.S. House of Representatives (1851–1859), shadow U.S. senator (1858–1859), U.S. senator (1859–1861) and southern Democratic nominee for vice president of the United States (1860).
Fred Kessler		Wisconsin	Democratic	Jan 11, 1940	20 years, 357 days	Jan 3, 1961 – Jan 7, 1963, Jan 4, 1965 – Jul 5, 1972, Jan 3, 2005 – Jan 3, 2019	At the time the youngest-ever Wisconsin state legislator.
Jim Normand		New Hampshire	Democratic	Dec 12, 1953	20 years, 357 days	Dec 4, 1974 – Dec 6, 1978	Later state executive councilor (1997–1999).
Homer Hendricks		Texas	Democratic	Jan 19, 1900	20 years, 358 days	Jan 11, 1921 – Jan 13, 1925	Youngest-ever Texas state representative.
Thomas Dixon Jr.		North Carolina	Democratic	Jan 11, 1864	20 years, 362 days	Jan 7, 1885 – Jan 5, 1887	
Garrett Muscatel		New Hampshire	Democratic	Dec 7, 1997	20 years, 363 days	Dec 5, 2018 – Jun 8, 2020	
Jesse N. Smith		Utah	Independent	Dec 2, 1834	20–21 years	1855 – 1856, Jan 8, 1872 – Jan 12, 1874, Jan 10, 1876 – Jan 14, 1878, Jan 12, 1880 – Jan 9, 1882	Later Arizona legislator (1897–1899).
Seaborn Roddenbery		Georgia	Democratic	Jan 12, 1870	21 years, 0 days	Jan 12, 1891 – 1895	Later mayor of Thomasville (1903–1904) and U.S. representative (1910–1913).
Sherry Shealy Martschink		South Carolina	Republican	Oct 26, 1949	21 years, 14 days	Nov 9, 1970 – 1974	Daughter of Ryan Shealy. Later state senator (1987–1990) and candidate for lieutenant governor (1990).
Tad Jude		Minnesota	Democratic	Dec 13, 1951	21 years, 20 days	Jan 2, 1973 – Jan 4, 1983	Youngest-ever Minnesota state legislator. Son of Victor N. Jude. Later state senator (1983–1989) and candidate for state attorney general (2022). Switched to the Republican Party in 1992.
Clyde R. Hoey		North Carolina	Democratic	Dec 11, 1877	21 years, 24 days	Jan 4, 1899 – Jan 7, 1903	Later state senator (1903–1905), U.S. representative (1919–1921), governor (1937–1941) and U.S. senator (1945–1954).
Claire Cory		North Dakota	Republican	Sep 11, 1998	21 years, 30 days	Oct 11, 2019 – present	
Amber Mariano		Florida	Republican	Nov 1, 1995	21 years, 32 days	Dec 3, 2016 – Nov 8, 2022	
Sam Farrington		New Hampshire	Republican	Oct 26, 2003	21 years, 39 days	Dec 4, 2024 – present	
Alex Looysen		North Dakota	Republican	Sep 21, 1991	21 years, 71 days	Dec 1, 2012 – Dec 1, 2016	
John G. Jackson		Virginia	Democratic-Republican	Sep 22, 1777	21 years, 72 days	Dec 3, 1798 – Dec 7, 1801, Dec 2, 1811 – Nov 30, 1812	Son of George Jackson. Later U.S. representative (1803–1810, 1813–1817).
Michael E. Cassidy		Pennsylvania	Democratic	Sep 15, 1955	21 years, 77 days	Dec 1, 1976 – Dec 1, 1978	
Jack W. Connell Jr.		Texas	Democratic	Oct 21, 1937	21 years, 84 days	Jan 13, 1959 – Jan 8, 1963	
Mark Connolly		New Hampshire	Republican	Sep 2, 1955	21 years, 90 days	Dec 1, 1976 – Dec 6, 1978	Later candidate for state treasurer (1990) and for governor (2016). Switched to the Democratic Party.
Joseph Montoya		New Mexico	Democratic	Sep 24, 1915	21 years, 99 days	Jan 1, 1937 – Jan 1, 1941	Youngest-ever New Mexico state representative and subsequently the youngest-ever New Mexico state senator. Later state senator (1941–1947), lieutenant governor (1947–1951, 1955–1957), U.S. representative (1957–1964) and U.S. senator (1964–1977).
Cordell Hull		Tennessee	Democratic	Oct 2, 1871	21 years, 100 days	Jan 10, 1893 – Jan 12, 1897	Later U.S. representative (1907–1921, 1923–1931), chair of the DNC (1921–1924), U.S. senator (1931–1933) and U.S. secretary of state (1933–1944).
Mike Unhjem		North Dakota	Republican	Aug 22, 1953	21 years, 101 days	Dec 1, 1974 – Dec 1, 1986	
David Clarenbach		Wisconsin	Democratic	Sep 26, 1953	21 years, 102 days	Jan 6, 1975 – Jan 4, 1993	Grandson of Alexander Frederick. Later speaker pro tempore (1983–1993).
Neil Craig Corson		Maine	Republican	Aug 24, 1947	21 years, 102 days	Dec 4, 1968 – Dec 2, 1970	
Edward Lloyd		Maryland	Democratic-Republican	Jul 22, 1779	21 years, 104 days	Nov 3, 1800 – Nov 3, 1806	Later U.S. representative (1806–1809), governor (1809–1811), U.S. senator (1819–1826), state senator (1826–1831) and president of the state senate (1826–1827).
William J. Gavigan		California	Workingmen's/ Democratic	Sep 17, 1859	21 years, 108 days	Jan 3, 1881 – Jan 8, 1883	Youngest person ever elected to the California State Legislature.
Drew Dennert		South Dakota	Republican	Aug 28, 1995	21 years, 128 days	Jan 3, 2017 – present	
Matthew Heilman		North Dakota	Republican	Jul 19, 2001	21 years, 135 days	Dec 1, 2022 – present	
Scott Newhard		Iowa	Democratic	Aug 23, 1951	21 years, 138 days	Jan 8, 1973 – Jan 7, 1979	Youngest-ever Iowa state legislator.
Wayne Olhoft		Minnesota	Democratic	Aug 1, 1951	21 years, 154 days	Jan 2, 1973 – Jan 3, 1983	
Steven Howard		Vermont	Democratic	Aug 3, 1971	21 years, 156 days	Jan 6, 1993 – Jan 1999, Jan 2005 – Jan 2011	
Ygnacio Sepúlveda		California	Democratic	Jul 1, 1842	21 years, 159 days	Dec 7, 1863 – Dec 4, 1865	
Joseph Walkovich		Connecticut	Democratic	Aug 1, 1953	21 years, 160 days	Jan 8, 1975 – Jan 9, 1985	
Jamie Whitten		Mississippi	Democratic	Apr 18, 1910	21 years, 162 days	Sep 27, 1931 – Jan 5, 1932	Later U.S. representative (1941–1995) and dean of the U.S. House (1979–1995).
John William Connelly		Texas	Democratic	Aug 2, 1919	21 years, 165 days	Jan 14, 1941 – Jan 9, 1945	
Patrick J. Kennedy		Rhode Island	Democratic	Jul 14, 1967	21 years, 171 days	Jan 1, 1989 – Jan 3, 1993	Son of Ted Kennedy and nephew of president John F. Kennedy. Later U.S. representative (1995–2011).
R. Carlisle Burdick		Minnesota	[?]	Jul 14, 1834	21 years, 172 days	Jan 2, 1856 – Jan 6, 1857	
Benjamin Bubar Jr.		Maine	Republican	Jun 17, 1917	21 years, 173 days	Dec 7, 1938 – Dec 6, 1944	Son of state representative Benjamin Bubar Sr. Later Prohibition Party nominee for president of the United States (1976, 1980).
Brandon Prichard		North Dakota	Republican	May 29, 2001	21 years, 186 days	Dec 1, 2022 – December 1, 2024	
Henry Tazewell		Virginia	Independent	Nov 27, 1753	21 years, 186 days	Jun 1, 1775 – Mar 31, 1785	Later U.S. senator (1794–1799) and president pro tempore of the U.S. Senate (1795). Joined the Anti-Administration and Democratic-Republican parties.
John E. Rohan		Wisconsin	Democratic	Jul 5, 1907	21 years, 188 days	Jan 9, 1929 – Jan 7, 1931	
Jim Douglas		Vermont	Republican	Jun 21, 1951	21 years, 196 days	Jan 3, 1973 – Jan 3, 1979	Later state secretary of state (1981–1993), nominee for U.S. senator (1992), state treasurer (1995–2003) and governor (2003–2011).
Nathan Carlow		Maine	Republican	May 18, 1999	21 years, 198 days	Dec 2, 2020 – present	
Barry Hobbins		Maine	Democratic	May 17, 1951	21 years, 203 days	Dec 6, 1972 – Dec 5, 1984, Dec 5, 2012 – Dec 3, 2016	Later state senator (1988–1990, 2004–2012) and state public advocate (2017–2021).
Rudy García		Florida	Republican	Apr 15, 1963	21 years, 205 days	Nov 6, 1984 – Nov 8, 1988; Nov 7, 1989 – Nov 7, 2000	Later state senator (2000–2010) and candidate for mayor of Hialeah (2011).
Jerry J. O'Connell		Montana	Democratic	Jun 14, 1909	21 years, 205 days	Jan 5, 1931 – Jan 7, 1935	Later U.S. representative (1937–1939).
Tulsi Gabbard		Hawaii	Democratic	Apr 12, 1981	21 years, 207 days	Nov 5, 2002 – Nov 2, 2004	Daughter of Mike Gabbard. Later U.S. representative (2013–2021) and candidate for president of the United States (2020). Left the Democratic Party in October 2022.
Sarah Laszloffy		Montana	Republican	Jun 13, 1991	21 years, 208 days	Jan 7, 2013 – Jan 2, 2017	
John Bell		Tennessee	Democratic-Republican	Feb 18, 1796	21 years, 209 days	Sep 15, 1817 – Nov 25, 1817	Later U.S. representative (1827–1841), speaker of the U.S. House (1834–1835), secretary of war (1841), state representative (1847), U.S. senator (1847–1859) and Constitutional Union nominee for president of the United States (1860).
DeWitt Hale		Texas	Democratic	Jun 10, 1917	21 years, 214 days	Jan 10, 1939 – Dec 14, 1940, Jan 13, 1953 – Sep 30, 1978	
Will L. King		Iowa	Republican	Jun 9, 1897	21 years, 218 days	Jan 13, 1919 – Jan 9, 1921	
Thomas J. Creamer		New York	Democratic	May 26, 1843	21 years, 220 days	Jan 1, 1865 – Dec 31, 1867, Jan 1, 1889 – Dec 31, 1889	Later state senator (1868–1871) and U.S. representative (1873–1875, 1901–1903).
Robert F. Larkin Jr.		Massachusetts	Democratic	May 29, 1955	21 years, 221 days	Jan 5, 1977 – Jan 7, 1981	
Justin Chenette		Maine	Democratic	Apr 23, 1991	21 years, 226 days	Dec 5, 2012 – Dec 7, 2016	Later state senator (2016–2020).
Drew Christensen		Minnesota	Republican	May 21, 1993	21 years, 230 days	Jan 6, 2015 – Jan 7, 2019	
Roger B. Taney		Maryland	Federalist	Mar 17, 1777	21 years, 233 days	Nov 5, 1798 – Jan 3, 1800	Later state attorney general (1827–1831), U.S. attorney general (1831–1833), secretary of the treasury (1833–1834) and chief justice (1836–1864).
Elise Hall		Oklahoma	Republican	Mar 26, 1989	21 years, 236 days	Nov 17, 2010 – Nov 21, 2018	
Patrick B. Augustine		Kansas	Democratic	May 14, 1955	21 years, 241 days	Jan 10, 1977 – Jan 12, 1981	
Stephen Smith		Arkansas	Democratic	May 15, 1949	21 years, 241 days	Jan 11, 1971 – Jan 13, 1975	
John Tyler		Virginia	Democratic-Republican	Mar 29, 1790	21 years, 248 days	Dec 2, 1811 – Nov 11, 1816, 1839	Son of John Tyler Sr. Later U.S. representative (1816–1821), governor (1825–1827), U.S. senator (1827–1836), senate president pro tempore (1835), vice president (1841), president (1841–1845, at the time the youngest-ever U.S. president), member of the Provisional Confederate Congress (1861–1862) and representative-elect of the Confederate States Congress (1861–1862, died). Switched to the Democratic, Whig and Tyler Democratic parties.
Alec Ryncavage		Pennsylvania	Republican	Mar 27, 2001	21 years, 249 days	Dec 1, 2022 – present	
Joe Mitchell		Iowa	Republican	Apr 23, 1997	21 years, 253 days	Jan 1, 2019 – Jan 1, 2023	
Carlton W. Mauthe		Wisconsin	Republican	Apr 18, 1907	21 years, 264 days	Jan 7, 1929 – Jan 3, 1933	
Jewell Jones		Michigan	Democratic	Apr 11, 1995	21 years, 265 days	Jan 1, 2017 – present	Youngest legislator in Michigan history.
J.T. Larson		Wyoming	Republican	Apr 6, 2001	21 years, 271 days	Jan 2, 2023 – present	
James Arthur Field		Vermont	Republican	Apr 10, 1941	21 years, 274 days	Jan 9, 1963 – [?]	
John S. Addis		Connecticut	Democratic	Apr 4, 1889	21 years, 275 days	Jan 4, 1911 – Jan 3, 1917	Later state treasurer (1935–1937).
Edmund Benjamin Grunwald		Wisconsin	Republican	Mar 27, 1899	21 years, 282 days	Jan 3, 1921 – Jan 3, 1923	
Josh Cockroft		Oklahoma	Republican	Feb 6, 1989	21 years, 283 days	Nov 16, 2010 – Nov 15, 2018	Later state secretary of state (2023–present).
William Henry McMorrow		Massachusetts	Democratic	Mar 23, 1871	21 years, 287 days	Jan 4, 1893 – Jan 2, 1895	Later state senator (1895–1897).
Patrick Seymour		Vermont	Republican	Mar 25, 1997	21 years, 290 days	Jan 9, 2019 – Feb 24, 2022	Priorly member of the Democratic Party.
Ben Queen		West Virginia	Republican	Feb 7, 1995	21 years, 298 days	Dec 1, 2016 – Dec 1, 2022	Later state senator (2022–present).
Lafayette Lane		Oregon	Democratic	Nov 12, 1842	21 years, 305 days	Sep 12, 1864 – Oct 22, 1864	Son of Joseph Lane. Later U.S. representative (1875–1877).
Calvin Callahan		Wisconsin	Republican	Mar 2, 1999	21 years, 308 days	Jan 4, 2021 – present	
Robert M. Clarke		California	Republican	Mar 5, 1879	21 years, 308 days	Jan 7, 1901 – Jan 5, 1903	
Charles A. Barnard		Wisconsin	Republican	Mar 3, 1907	21 years, 310 days	Jan 7, 1929 – Jan 5, 1931	
Akbar Ali		Georgia	Democratic	January 24, 2004	21 years, 323 days	Dec 18, 2025 – present	
George Plater		Maryland	Proprietary	Nov 8, 1735	21 years, 324 days	Sep 28, 1757 – May 24, 1768	Later state senator (1771–1774, 1777–1791), member of the Annapolis Convention (1775–1776), president of the state senate (1780–1782, 1784, 1785, 1786, 1787–1788, 1790) and governor (1791–1792). Switched to the Federalist Party.
Sydney Emanuel Mudd I		Maryland	Republican	Feb 12, 1858	21 years, 329 days	Jan 7, 1880 – Jan 2, 1884, Jan 1, 1896 – Jan 5, 1898	Later U.S. representative (1890–1891, 1897–1911) and speaker of the state House (1896–1897).
Kenneth M. O'Brien		Massachusetts	Democratic	Feb 5, 1951	21 years, 333 days	Jan 3, 1973 – Jan 1, 1975	
Brodie Deshaies		New Hampshire	Republican	Jan 1, 1999	21 years, 336 days	Dec 2, 2020 – Dec 7, 2022	
Reid W. Crawford		Iowa	Republican	Feb 6, 1951	21 years, 337 days	Jan 8, 1973 – Aug 8, 1981	
Kevin Furey		Montana	Democratic	Jan 24, 1983	21 years, 345 days	Jan 3, 2005 – 2007	Succeeded in office by his father Tim.
Eugene Miller		Texas	Democratic	Jan 25, 1899	21 years, 352 days	Jan 11, 1921 – Jan 13, 1925	Later state senator (1925–1931) and state senate president pro tempore (1929–1931).
Jeramey Anderson		Mississippi	Democratic	Dec 6, 1991	21 years, 355 days	Nov 26, 2013 – present	
Will Greer		Vermont	Democratic	Jan 15, 2003	21 years, 359 days	Jan 8, 2025 – present	
George Cushingberry Jr.		Michigan	Democratic	Jan 6, 1953	21 years, 360 days	Jan 1, 1975 – Dec 31, 1982, Jan 1, 2005 – Dec 31, 2010	
Charles N. Brush		Connecticut	Democratic	1905	21 years	Jan 5, 1927 – Jan 7, 1931	
Hugh J. Corcoran		California	Democratic	1858	21 years	Jan 5, 1880 – Jan 3, 1881	
Anthony Edgecomb		Maine	Republican	1993	21 years	Dec 3, 2014 – Dec 7, 2016	Grandson of Peter Edgecomb.
Robert W. Ginnett		Washington	Democratic	1915	21 years	Jan 11, 1937 – Jan 9, 1939	
C. Huntington Lathrop		Connecticut	Republican	1893	21 years	Jan 6, 1915 – Jan 3, 1917	
Richard I. Thomas		California	Republican	Jun 1871	21 years	Jan 2, 1893 – Jan 4, 1897	
Joshua Whitehouse		New Hampshire	Republican	Apr 1993	21 years	Dec 3, 2014 – Dec 7, 2016	
John B. Henderson		Missouri	Democratic	Nov 16, 1826	22 years, 4 days	Nov 20, 1848 – 1858; 1856–1858	Since Henderson was only 22 years old, his swearing-in was in violation of the state constitution's age requirement of 24 years. Later U.S. senator (1862–1869).
Kayla Kessinger		West Virginia	Republican	Nov 25, 1992	22 years, 6 days	Dec 1, 2014 – present	
James Henry Brennan		Massachusetts	Democratic	Dec 21, 1888	22 years, 14 days	Jan 4, 1911 – Jan 6, 1915, Jan 1, 1919 – Jan 7, 1920	
Doyle Conner		Florida	Democratic	Dec 17, 1928	22 years, 16 days	Jan 2, 1951 – Jan 3, 1961	Later speaker of the state House (1957–1959) and state agriculture commissioner (1961–1991).
Simon Sefzik		Washington	Republican	Dec 21, 1999	22 years, 21 days	Jan 11, 2022 – Dec 9, 2022	
James W. Grimes	location=center	Iowa	Whig	Oct 20, 1816	22 years, 23 days	Nov 12, 1838 – Nov 3, 1839, Dec 4, 1843 – May 4, 1845, Nov 6, 1852 – Dec 3, 1854	Later governor (1854–1858) and U.S. senator (1859–1869). Co-founder of the state Republican Party (1856).
Cecil H. Underwood		West Virginia	Republican	Nov 5, 1922	22 years, 26 days	Dec 1, 1944 – Dec 1, 1956	Later governor (1957–1961, 1997–2001). Both the youngest and the oldest person to serve as governor of the state, winning his second term 40 years after winning his first.
Gene Stipe		Oklahoma	Democratic	Oct 21, 1926	22 years, 28 days	Nov 18, 1948 – Nov 18, 1954	Later state senator (1957–2003), becoming the longest-serving state senator in Oklahoma history.
David Cote		New Hampshire	Democratic	Oct 28, 1960	22 years, 34 days	Dec 1, 1982 – Jul 5, 2023	Later minority leader (2022).
Eugene Talbert		Texas	Democratic	Dec 8, 1914	22 years, 35 days	Jan 12, 1937 – Jan 14, 1941	
Kenneth Corn		Oklahoma	Democratic	Oct 8, 1976	22 years, 41 days	Nov 18, 1998 – Nov 20, 2002	Later state senator (2002–2010) and nominee for lieutenant governor (2010).
Ignatius A. Richardson		California	Democratic	Nov 24, 1890	22 years, 43 days	Jan 6, 1913 – Jan 4, 1915	
Cole L. Blease		South Carolina	Democratic	Oct 8, 1868	22 years, 48 days	Nov 25, 1890 – Nov 27, 1894, Jan 10, 1899 – Jan 8, 1901	Later state senator (1907–1909), state senate president pro tempore (1907–1909), governor (1911–1915) and U.S. senator (1925–1931).
Virgil Lilley		Texas	Democratic	Nov 25, 1908	22 years, 49 days	Jan 13, 1931 – Jan 10, 1933	
Sherrod Brown		Ohio	Democratic	Nov 9, 1952	22 years, 55 days	Jan 3, 1975 – Dec 31, 1982	Later state secretary of state (1983–1991) and U.S. senator (2007–present).
Curtis Hooks Brogden		North Carolina	Democratic	Nov 6, 1816	22 years, 56 days	Jan 1, 1839 – Jan 1, 1851, Jan 1, 1887 – Jan 1, 1889	Later state senator (1853–1857), lieutenant governor (1873–1874), governor (1874–1877) and U.S. representative (1877–1879). Switched to the Republican Party in 1867.
Curtis Hooks Brogden		North Carolina	Republican	Nov 6, 1816	22 years, 56 days	Jan 1, 1839 – Jan 1, 1851, Jan 1, 1887 – Jan 1, 1889	Later state senator (1853–1857), lieutenant governor (1873–1874), governor (1874–1877) and U.S. representative (1877–1879). Switched to the Republican Party in 1867.
Henry L. Pinckney		South Carolina	Nullifier	Sep 24, 1794	22 years, 62 days	Nov 25, 1816 – Nov 24, 1828, Nov 22, 1830 – Mar 4, 1833	Son of Charles Pinckney. Later mayor of Charleston (1829–1830, 1831–1833, 1837–1840), speaker of the state House (1830–1833) and U.S. representative (1833–1837).
Benjamin Troy Woodall		Texas	Democratic	Jul 4, 1904	22 years, 71 days	Sep 13, 1926 – Jul 5, 1929	
Ryan Fecteau		Maine	Democratic	Sep 18, 1992	22 years, 76 days	Dec 3, 2014 – Dec 7, 2022	Later speaker of the state House (2020–2022).
Odis Allan Weldon		Texas	Democratic	Oct 25, 1914	22 years, 79 days	Jan 12, 1937 – Oct 1, 1940	
John Engler		Michigan	Republican	Oct 12, 1948	22 years, 81 days	Jan 1, 1971 – Jan 1, 1979	Later state senator (1979–1991), senate majority leader (1984–1991) and governor (1991–2003).
Christina Hagan		Ohio	Republican	Dec 11, 1988	22 years, 81 days	Mar 2, 2011 – Dec 31, 2018	Her father, John Hagan, previously represented the district.
Jack Edward Love		Texas	Democratic	Oct 23, 1918	22 years, 83 days	Jan 14, 1941 – Jan 14, 1947	
Peppy Blount		Texas	Democratic	Oct 19, 1924	22 years, 87 days	Jan 14, 1947 – Sep 26, 1951	
Ratcliffe Hicks		Connecticut	Democratic	Oct 3, 1843	22 years, 92 days	Jan 3, 1866 – Jan 9, 1895	
Frederick W. Dallinger		Massachusetts	Republican	Oct 2, 1871	22 years, 93 days	Jan 3, 1894 – Jan 1, 1896	Later state senator (1896–1900) and U.S. representative (1915–1925, 1926–1932).
Gabe Leland		Michigan	Democratic	Sep 28, 1982	22 years, 95 days	Jan 1, 2005 – Jan 1, 2011	Son of Burton Leland.
Lester Clark		Texas	Democratic	Oct 5, 1916	22 years, 97 days	Jan 10, 1939 – Jan 9, 1945	
Adam Putnam		Florida	Republican	Jul 31, 1974	22 years, 97 days	Nov 5, 1996 – Nov 7, 2000	Later U.S. representative (2001–2011), state agriculture commissioner (2011–2019) and candidate for governor (2018).
Frank A. Day		Minnesota	Republican	Sep 30, 1855	22 years, 100 days	Jan 8, 1878 – Jan 6, 1879	Later state senator (1887–1895) and lieutenant governor (1895–1897).
William K. Hall		Kansas	Republican	Oct 1, 1942	22 years, 102 days	Jan 11, 1965 – Jan 9, 1967	
Colleen House		Michigan	Republican	Mar 17, 1952	22 years, 106 days	Jul 1, 1974 – Dec 31, 1976, Jan 1, 1983 – Dec 31, 1986	Later candidate for governor (1986).
Brandon Michael Newton		South Carolina	Republican	Jul 29, 1994	22 years, 108 days	Nov 14, 2016 – present	
Bob Ware		Texas	Republican	Sep 21, 1956	22 years, 110 days	Jan 9, 1979 – Jan 11, 1983	
David Morales		Rhode Island	Democratic	Sep 16, 1998	22 years, 111 days	Jan 5, 2021 – present	
Bakari Sellers		South Carolina	Democratic	Sep 18, 1984	22 years, 113 days	Jan 9, 2007 – Jan 6, 2015	
Dick Guidry		Louisiana	Democratic	Sep 22, 1929	22 years, 114 days	Jan 14, 1952 – 1956, 1964 – 1976	
William B. Rosenfield		Tennessee	[?]	Jul 15, 1894	22 years, 115 days	Nov 7, 1916 – Nov 5, 1918	
Patrick Joseph Kearns		Massachusetts	Democratic	Sep 8, 1912	22 years, 116 days	Jan 2, 1935 – Jan 6, 1937	
John R. Lynch		Mississippi	Republican	Sep 10, 1847	22 years, 116 days	Jan 4, 1870 – 1873	Later speaker of the state House (1872–1873) and U.S. representative (1873–1877, 1882–1883).
Bob C. Riley		Arkansas	Democratic	Sep 18, 1924	22 years, 117 days	Jan 13, 1947 – Jan 8, 1951	Later lieutenant governor (1971–1975), candidate for governor (1974) and acting governor (1975).
Mike Cooney		Montana	Democratic	Sep 3, 1954	22 years, 122 days	Jan 3, 1977 – Jan 3, 1981	Later state secretary of state (1989–2001), candidate for governor (2000), state senator (2003–2011), state senate president (2007–2009), lieutenant governor (2016–2021) and nominee for governor (2020).
Thomas Hubbard Allen		Connecticut	Republican	Sep 4, 1862	22 years, 125 days	Jan 7, 1885 – Jan 5, 1887, Jan 9, 1889 – Jan 7, 1891, Jan 4, 1893 – Jan 6, 1897	Later state senator (1887–1889).
Arthur Clark		Massachusetts	Democratic	Aug 30, 1877	22 years, 126 days	Jan 3, 1900 – Jan 2, 1901	
Stephen Morse Wheeler		New Hampshire	Republican	Aug 30, 1900	22 years, 126 days	Jan 3, 1923 – Jan 7, 1925	Later state attorney general (1942–1944).
Henry F. Ashurst		Arizona	Democratic	Aug 30, 1900	22 years, 127 days	Jan 18, 1897 – Jan 21, 1901	Later speaker of the House (1899–1901), territorial senator (1903–1905) and U.S. senator (1912–1941).
Stevens Thomson Mason		Virginia	Independent	Dec 29, 1760	22 years, 127 days	May 5, 1783 – May 3, 1784, Nov 11, 1794 – Nov 10, 1795	Son of Thomson Mason. Later state senator (1787–1791) and U.S. senator (1794–1803).
John W. Cummings		Massachusetts	Democratic	Aug 25, 1855	22 years, 130 days	Jan 2, 1878 – May 17, 1878	Later state senator (1883) and mayor of Fall River (1885, 1887–1888).
Samuel Aubrey Jones		Texas	Democratic	Sep 2, 1914	22 years, 132 days	Jan 12, 1937 – Dec 2, 1937	
Jayne Aylward		Kansas	Republican	Aug 28, 1956	22 years, 133 days	Jan 8, 1979 – Jan 14, 1991	
Lloyd Lindgren		Washington	Democratic	Sep 3, 1912	22 years, 133 days	Jan 14, 1935 – Jan 9, 1939, Jan 8, 1945 – Jan 13, 1947	
Paul Hess		Kansas	Republican	Aug 29, 1948	22 years, 135 days	Jan 11, 1971 – Jan 8, 1973	
George W. McCrary		Iowa	Republican	Aug 29, 1835	22 years, 135 days	Jan 11, 1858 – Jan 8, 1860, Jan 13, 1862 – Jan 7, 1866	Later U.S. representative (1869–1877) and U.S. secretary of war (1877–1879).
Dennis Dollar		Mississippi	Democratic	Aug 22, 1953	22 years, 137 days	Jan 6, 1976 – Jan 3, 1984	Later candidate for state secretary of state (1983).
Joseph T. Robinson		Arkansas	Democratic	Aug 26, 1872	22 years, 141 days	Jan 14, 1895 – Jan 11, 1897	Later governor (1913), U.S. senator (1913–1937), senate minority leader (1923–1933), senate majority leader (1933–1937), candidate for president of the United States (1924) and nominee for vice president (1928).
Richard Tisei		Massachusetts	Republican	Aug 13, 1962	22 years, 143 days	Jan 3, 1985 – Jan 3, 1991	Later state senator (1991–2011), state senate minority leader (2007–2011) and nominee for lieutenant governor (2010).
Terry Gardiner		Alaska	Democratic	Aug 12, 1950	22 years, 149 days	Jan 8, 1973 – Jan 17, 1983	
Herman J. McDevitt		Idaho	Democratic	Jun 29, 1928	22 years, 155 days	Dec 1, 1950 – [?]	
Michael W. Morrissey		Massachusetts	Democratic	Aug 2, 1954	22 years, 156 days	Jan 5, 1977 – Jan 6, 1993	Later state senator (1993–2011).
Kesha Ram Hinsdale		Vermont	Democratic	Aug 2, 1986	22 years, 158 days	Jan 7, 2009 – May 11, 2016	Later state senator (2021–present).
Carl Mario D'Aquila		Minnesota	Republican	Aug 1, 1924	22 years, 159 days	Jan 7, 1947 – Jan 1, 1951	At the time the youngest-ever Minnesota state legislator.
Ernest F. Davis		Massachusetts	Democratic	Jul 30, 1892	22 years, 160 days	Jan 6, 1915 – Jan 5, 1916	
Abel P. Upshur		Virginia	Federalist	Jun 17, 1790	22 years, 166 days	Nov 30, 1812 – May 16, 1813, Nov 29, 1824 – 1826	Son of state senator Littleton Upshur. Later United States Secretary of the Navy (1841–1843) and United States Secretary of State (1843–1844). Switched to the Jacksonian Democrat and Whig parties.
George C. Morris		Texas	Democratic	Jul 17, 1912	22 years, 175 days	Jan 8, 1935 – Jun 11, 1942	Later state senator (1942–1951).
George H. Beers		Connecticut	Democratic	Jul 15, 1866	22 years, 178 days	Jan 9, 1889 – Jan 7, 1891	
Henry Beck		Maine	Democratic	Jun 6, 1986	22 years, 180 days	Dec 3, 2008 – Dec 7, 2016	Later state treasurer (2019–present).
Tom Davidson		Maine	Democratic	Jun 8, 1972	22 years, 182 days	Dec 7, 1994 – Dec 6, 2000	
Chris Pappas		New Hampshire	Democratic	Jun 4, 1980	22 years, 183 days	Dec 4, 2002 – Dec 6, 2006	Later member of the Executive Council (2013–2019) and U.S. representative (2019–present).
Jabez Lamar Monroe Curry		Alabama	Democratic	Jun 5, 1825	22 years, 184 days	Dec 6, 1847 – Nov 12, 1849, Nov 14, 1853 – Mar 4, 1857	Later U.S. representative (1857–1861), Provisional Confederate Congress deputy (1861–1862) and Confederate States representative (1862–1864).
Arnold F. Wellman Jr.		Connecticut	Democratic	Jul 3, 1954	22 years, 186 days	Jan 5, 1977 – Jan 5, 1983	
Katherine Kazarian		Rhode Island	Democratic	Jun 25, 1990	22 years, 190 days	Jan 1, 2013 – present	
Corry Thaddeus Sheats		Texas	Democratic	Jul 5, 1902	22 years, 192 days	Jan 13, 1925 – Jan 8, 1929	
Will Haskell		Connecticut	Democratic	Jun 28, 1996	22 years, 195 days	Jan 9, 2019 – Jan 4, 2023	
Heath Howard		New Hampshire	Democratic	May 26, 2000	22 years, 195 days	Dec 7, 2022 – present	
Josie Tomkow		Florida	Republican	Oct 15, 1995	22 years, 198 days	May 1, 2018 – present	
Travis Bennett		New Hampshire	Democratic	May 16, 1992	22 years, 201 days	Dec 3, 2014 – Dec 4, 2018	
Jake Blum		North Dakota	Republican	May 11, 1994	22 years, 204 days	Dec 1, 2016 – Oct 4, 2019	
Cole Christensen		North Dakota	Republican	May 6, 1998	22 years, 209 days	Dec 1, 2020 – Feb 23, 2024	
Clyde H. Smith		Maine	Republican	Jun 9, 1876	22 years, 209 days	Jan 4, 1899 – Jan 7, 1903, Jan 1, 1919 – Jan 3, 1923	Later state senator (1923–1929) and U.S. representative (1937–1940).
Walter Kunicki		Wisconsin	Democratic	Jun 9, 1958	22 years, 210 days	Jan 5, 1981 – Jan 3, 1999	Later speaker of the state House (1991–1995) and state House minority leader (1995–1998).
David Settle Reid		North Carolina	Democratic	Apr 19, 1813	22 years, 211 days	Nov 16, 1835 – Nov 21, 1842	Nephew of Thomas Settle. Later U.S. representative (1843–1847), governor (1851–1854) and U.S. senator (1854–1859).
Timothy F. Maloney		Maryland	Democratic	Jun 12, 1956	22 years, 212 days	Jan 10, 1979 – 1994	
Steven Wayne Long		South Carolina	Republican	Apr 14, 1994	22 years, 214 days	Nov 14, 2016 – present	
Robert B. Anderson		Texas	Democratic	Jun 4, 1910	22 years, 220 days	Jan 10, 1933 – Sep 11, 1933	Later U.S. secretary of the navy (1953–1954), deputy secretary of defense (1954–1955) and secretary of the treasury (1957–1961). Switched to the Republican Party in 1956.
Kevin R. Ryan		South Carolina	Republican	Mar 30, 1988	22 years, 223 days	Nov 8, 2010 – Nov 12, 2012	
Carter Nordman		Iowa	Republican	May 27, 1998	22 years, 229 days	Jan 11, 2021 – present	
William A. Steiger		Wisconsin	Republican	May 15, 1938	22 years, 233 days	Jan 3, 1961 – 1965	Priorly chairman of the College Republican National Committee (1959–1961). Later U.S. representative (1967–1978).
John Sackett		Alaska	Republican	Jun 3, 1944	22 years, 234 days	Jan 23, 1967 – Jan 11, 1971, Jan 8, 1973 – Jan 19, 1987	
Norris Cotton		New Hampshire	Republican	May 11, 1900	22 years, 237 days	Jan 3, 1923 – Jan 7, 1925; 1943–1947	Later speaker of the state House (1945–1947), U.S. representative (1947–1954), and U.S. senator (1954–1974, 1975).
Dave Woodward		Michigan	Democratic	May 9, 1976	22 years, 237 days	Jan 1, 1999 – Jan 1, 2005	
Jonathan Zlotnik		Massachusetts	Democratic	May 7, 1990	22 years, 240 days	Jan 2, 2013 – present	
Allen F. Behnke		Connecticut	Republican	May 6, 1916	22 years, 243 days	Jan 4, 1939 – Jan 6, 1943	
William Siles Robinson		California	Republican	May 4, 1874	22 years, 245 days	Jan 4, 1897 – Jan 7, 1901	
Lucy Boyden		Vermont	Democratic	May 1, 2000	22 years, 248 days	Jan 4, 2023 – present	
Doug Stang		Minnesota	Republican	May 4, 1974	22 years, 248 days	Jan 7, 1997 – Jun 30, 2004	
Julie Slama		Nebraska	Republican	May 2, 1996	22 years, 252 days	Jan 9, 2019 – present	Third youngest ever Nebraska legislator, and youngest-ever woman.
Peter Forman		Massachusetts	Republican	Apr 28, 1958	22 years, 254 days	Jan 7, 1981 – Jan 4, 1995	Later minority leader (1991–1995) and candidate for secretary of the commonwealth (1994).
Randall Evans Jr.		Georgia	Democratic	May 3, 1906	22 years, 256 days	Jan 14, 1929 – [?]	Became the youngest-ever Georgia state representative and speaker of the House.
Joseph Prentis		Virginia	Independent	Jan 24, 1754	22 years, 257 days	Oct 7, 1776 – 1778, May 7, 1781 – Jan 8, 1788	Later speaker of the state House (1786–1788).
Calvin Goings		Washington	Democratic	Apr 3, 1973	22 years, 261 days	Dec 20, 1995 – Jan 8, 2001	At the time the youngest-ever Washington state senator.
Tom Scott		Connecticut	Republican	Apr 21, 1958	22 years, 261 days	Jan 7, 1981 – Jan 9, 1991	Later independent candidate for governor (1994).
Earl Ray Tomblin		West Virginia	Democratic	Mar 15, 1952	22 years, 261 days	Dec 1, 1974 – Dec 1, 1980	Later state senator (1980–2011), president of the state senate (1995–2011) and governor (2011–2017).
Chester G. Atkins		Massachusetts	Democratic	Apr 14, 1948	22 years, 267 days	Jan 6, 1971 – Jan 3, 1973	Later state senator (1973–1985) and U.S. representative (1985–1993).
Ben Barnes		Texas	Democratic	Apr 17, 1938	22 years, 268 days	Jan 10, 1961 – Jan 14, 1969	Later speaker of the state House (1965–1969), lieutenant governor (1969–1973) and candidate for governor (1972).
Joseph Norvell		Kansas	Democratic	Apr 14, 1950	22 years, 269 days	Jan 8, 1973 – Jan 10, 1977	Later state senator (1977–1989).
Joseph Pulitzer		Missouri	Republican	Apr 10, 1847	22 years, 270 days	Jan 5, 1870 – Mar 24, 1870	Since Pulitzer was only 22 years old, his swearing-in was in violation of the state constitution's age requirement of 24 years. Later U.S. representative (1885–1886). Co-founder of the Liberal Republican Party (1870); switched to the Democratic Party in 1874.
William Jennings Bryan Dorn		South Carolina	Democratic	Apr 14, 1916	22 years, 271 days	Jan 10, 1939 – Jun 8, 1940	Later state senator (1941–1942), U.S. representative (1947–1949, 1951–1974) and nominee for governor (1974).
Roy Hofheinz		Texas	Democratic	Apr 10, 1912	22 years, 273 days	Jan 8, 1935 – Jan 12, 1937	Later mayor of Houston (1953–1955).
Philip Davis Bryant		Mississippi	Democratic	Apr 5, 1937	22 years, 275 days	Jan 5, 1960 – Jan 2, 1968	
Matt Kisber		Tennessee	Democratic	Jan 31, 1960	22 years, 275 days	Nov 2, 1982 – Nov 5, 2002	
Michael G. Kirby		Wisconsin	Democratic	Apr 2, 1952	22 years, 279 days	Jan 6, 1975 – Jan 3, 1983	
Judson C. Brusie		California	Republican	Mar 28, 1864	22 years, 281 days	Jan 3, 1887 – Jan 7, 1889	
Avery Frix		Oklahoma	Republican	Mar 29, 1994	22 years, 286 days	Jan 9, 2017 – Nov 23, 2022	
James G. Maguire		California	Democratic	Feb 22, 1853	22 years, 287 days	Dec 6, 1875 – Dec 3, 1877	Later U.S. representative (1893–1899) and nominee for governor (1898).
William Lowndes		South Carolina	Democratic-Republican	Feb 11, 1782	22 years, 289 days	Nov 26, 1804 – Nov 24, 1808	Later U.S. representative (1811–1822).
Kyle Hilbert		Oklahoma	Republican	Mar 23, 1994	22 years, 292 days	Jan 9, 2017 – present	Later speaker pro tempore (2022–present).
Susan Engeleiter		Wisconsin	Republican	Mar 18, 1952	22 years, 294 days	Jan 6, 1975 – Jan 3, 1979	Later state senator (1980–1989), nominee for U.S. senator (1988) and administrator of the Small Business Administration (1989–1991).
William M. McNicol		Connecticut	Democratic	Mar 16, 1896	22 years, 298 days	Jan 8, 1919 – Jan 5, 1921	
Hans Hunt		Wyoming	Republican	Mar 18, 1988	22 years, 299 days	Jan 11, 2011 – Oct 4, 2021	
Joshua Putnam		South Carolina	Republican	Nov 10, 1988	22 years, 299 days	Sep 5, 2011 – Nov 12, 2018	
Trey Stewart		Maine	Republican	Feb 7, 1994	22 years, 304 days	Dec 7, 2016 – Dec 2, 2020	Later state senator (2020–present) and senate minority leader (2022–present).
Thomas Johnson Martin		Texas	Democratic	Mar 10, 1894	22 years, 305 days	Jan 9, 1917 – Sep 29, 1917, Jan 14, 1947 – Sep 21, 1948	
Lauren Plawecki		Michigan	Democratic	Jan 29, 1994	22 years, 305 days	Nov 29, 2016 – Jan 1, 2017	Daughter of Julie Plawecki.
James P. Hurrell		Massachusetts	Democratic	Mar 1, 1944	22 years, 309 days	Jan 4, 1967 – Jan 1, 1969, Jan 6, 1971 – Jan 5, 1977	
Martin Olav Sabo		Minnesota	Democratic	Feb 28, 1938	22 years, 310 days	Jan 3, 1961 – 1978	Later speaker of the state House (1973–1979) and U.S. representative (1979–2007).
Edward B. Jackson		Virginia	Democratic-Republican	Jan 25, 1793	22 years, 313 days	Dec 4, 1815 – Dec 7, 1818	Son of George Jackson and younger brother of John G. Jackson. Later U.S. representative (1820–1823).
Jake Highfill		Iowa	Republican	Mar 3, 1990	22 years, 317 days	Jan 14, 2013 – Nov 6, 2018	
Avery Bourne		Illinois	Republican	Mar 30, 1992	22 years, 321 days	Feb 14, 2015 – Jan 11, 2023	Youngest-ever Illinois legislator. Later candidate for lieutenant governor (2022) as the running mate of Richard Irvin.
Jim Joseph Carmichall		Texas	Democratic	Feb 27, 1930	22 years, 321 days	Jan 13, 1953 – Jan 8, 1957	
Thomas A. Ledwith		New York	Democratic	Feb 14, 1840	22 years, 321 days	Jan 1, 1863 – Dec 31, 1863	Later candidate for mayor of New York City (1870) and state senator (1874–1875).
C. William O'Neill		Ohio	Republican	Feb 14, 1916	22 years, 321 days	Jan 1, 1939 – Jan 1, 1951	At the time the youngest-ever Ohio state representative. Later became the youngest-ever speaker of the Ohio House, youngest-ever Ohio attorney general and youngest-ever Ohio governor, and elected justice of the state Supreme Court at age 44.
Jim Jontz		Indiana	Democratic	Dec 18, 1951	22 years, 323 days	Nov 6, 1974 – Nov 7, 1984	Later state senator (1984–1986), U.S. representative (1987–1993) and nominee for U.S. senator (1994).
Chester Biesen		Washington	Republican	Feb 18, 1904	22 years, 326 days	Jan 10, 1927 – Jan 12, 1931	
LaFayette Duckett		Texas	Democratic	Feb 19, 1918	22 years, 330 days	Jan 14, 1941 – Jan 14, 1947	
William Johnson		South Carolina	Democratic-Republican	Dec 27, 1771	22 years, 332 days	Nov 24, 1794 – Nov 24, 1800	Later speaker of the state House (1798–1800) and associate justice of the Supreme Court (1804–1834).
Gregory W. Sullivan		Massachusetts	Democratic	Jan 29, 1952	22 years, 337 days	Jan 1, 1975 – Jan 2, 1985	
Samuel P. Walsh		Wisconsin	Republican	Jan 30, 1902	22 years, 341 days	Jan 5, 1925 – Jan 3, 1927	
Kenneth M. Lemanski		Massachusetts	Democratic	Jan 27, 1954	22 years, 344 days	Jan 5, 1977 – Jan 3, 1979, Jan 7, 1981 – Jan 6, 1993	
Jim T. Lindsey		Texas	Democratic	Feb 1, 1926	22 years, 345 days	Jan 11, 1949 – Jan 8, 1957	Later speaker of the state House (1955–1957).
Keith R. McCall		Pennsylvania	Democratic	Dec 16, 1959	22 years, 350 days	Dec 1, 1982 – Dec 1, 2010	Son of Thomas J. McCall. Later speaker of the state House (2009–2010).
Joseph Grigsby Smyth		Texas	Democratic	Feb 25, 1847	22 years, 350 days	Feb 10, 1870 – Jan 14, 1873	Son of George W. Smyth.
Steven C. Brist		Wisconsin	Democratic	Jan 16, 1954	22 years, 353 days	Jan 3, 1977 – Jan 3, 1979, Jan 3, 1983 – Jan 5, 1987	
John Gray		Massachusetts	Republican	Jan 12, 1956	22 years, 356 days	Jan 3, 1979 – Jan 2, 1985	
Harry T. Burn		Tennessee	Republican	Nov 12, 1895	22 years, 358 days	Nov 5, 1918 – Nov 7, 1922	Later state senator (1948–1952).
Andrew P. Quigley		Massachusetts	Democratic	Jan 13, 1926	22 years, 358 days	Jan 5, 1949 – Jan 3, 1951	Later state senator (1951–1957) and mayor of Chelsea (1952–1955).
Mildred Barber Abel		Wisconsin	Republican	Jan 9, 1902	22 years, 362 days	Jan 5, 1925 – Jan 3, 1927	
Leo E. Diehl		Massachusetts	Democratic	Jan 9, 1914	22 years, 363 days	Jan 6, 1937 – Jan 1, 1941	
John Robinson		Virginia	Independent	Feb 3, 1705	22 years, 363 days	Feb 1, 1728 – May 8, 1769	Later speaker of the House (1738–1766).
Raymond O. Baker		Connecticut	Democratic	1896	22 years	Jan 8, 1919 – Jan 5, 1921, Jan 3, 1923 – Jan 7, 1925	
William F. Bogue		Connecticut	Democratic	1866	22 years	Jan 9, 1889 – Jan 7, 1891	
Lawrence E. Carlson		Indiana	Republican	1902	22 years	Nov 5, 1924 – Nov 7, 1928	Later state senator (1934–1942).
Steve Fowler		Nebraska	Democratic	1950	22 years	Jan 5, 1973 – Jan 5, 1983	
George T. Greig		Washington	Democratic	1914	22 years	Jan 11, 1937 – Jan 9, 1939	
Allan A. Hall		Connecticut	Democratic	1896	22 years	Jan 8, 1919 – Jan 5, 1921	
Latham Hull		Connecticut	Democratic	1870	22 years	Jan 4, 1893 – Jan 9, 1895, Jan 4, 1905 – Jan 9, 1907	
Olin E. Hunt		Connecticut	Republican	1866	22 years	Jan 9, 1889 – Jan 7, 1891	
Ben Jickling		Vermont	Independent	1994	22 years	Jan 4, 2017 – Sep 1, 2019	
A. W. North		California	Republican	1874	22 years	Jan 4, 1897 – Jan 2, 1899	
Spencer Darwin Pettis		Missouri	Democratic-Republican	1802	22 years	Nov 15, 1824 – Jul 22, 1826	Since Pettis was only 22 years old, his swearing-in was in violation of the state constitution's age requirement of 24 years. Later Secretary of State of Missouri (1826–1828) and U.S. representative (1829–1831).
Arthur B. Porter		Connecticut	Democratic	1866	22 years	Jan 9, 1889 – Jan 7, 1891	
Arthur M. Proulx		Connecticut	Republican	1904	22 years	Jan 5, 1927 – Jan 9, 1929	
Andrew Rizner		Connecticut	Republican	1898	22 years	Jan 5, 1921 – Jan 3, 1923	
Michael B. Smith		Washington	Democratic	1912	22 years	Jan 14, 1935 – Jan 13, 1941	
Samuel L. Stevens		Connecticut	Democratic	1890	22 years	Jan 8, 1913 – Jan 6, 1915	
Joseph Alston		South Carolina	Democratic-Republican	1779	22–23 years	Nov 22, 1802 – Nov 26, 1804, Nov 20, 1805 – Dec 10, 1812	Son of William Alston. Later speaker of the state House (1805–1808, 1809–1812) and governor (1812–1814).
Felix Grundy		Kentucky	Democratic-Republican	Sep 11, 1777	22–23 years	1800–1802, 1804–1806	Later U.S. representative (1811–1814), Tennessee state representative (1819–1825), U.S. senator (1829–1838, 1839–1840) and U.S. attorney general (1838–1839).
Rylee Linting		Michigan	Republican	2001 or 2002	22–23 years	Jan 1, 2025 – present	
Mann Page		Virginia	Independent	1749	22–23 years	1772 – Dec 21, 1778	Delegate to the Continental Congress (1777–1778).
Dave Gruenes		Minnesota	Republican	Jan 6, 1958	23 years, 0 days	Jan 6, 1981 – Jan 2, 1995	
Eugene G. Walker		Connecticut	Republican	Jan 2, 1888	23 years, 2 days	Jan 4, 1911 – Jan 6, 1915	
Thomas Edward Campbell		Arizona	Republican	Jan 18, 1878	23 years, 3 days	Jan 21, 1901 – Jan 19, 1903	Later governor (1917, 1919–1923).
Bradley Fritts		Illinois	Republican	Jan 8, 2000	23 years, 3 days	Jan 11, 2023 – present	Youngest-ever elected Illinois legislator, though Avery Bourne was younger at the time of her appointment.
Alan Schlesinger		Connecticut	Republican	Jan 4, 1958	23 years, 3 days	Jan 7, 1981 – Jan 6, 1993	Later mayor of Derby (1994–1998) and nominee for U.S. senator (2006).
Thomas J. Jochum		Iowa	Democratic	Dec 25, 1951	23 years, 7 days	Jan 1, 1975 – Jan 1, 1993	
Donald P. Hutchinson		Maryland	Democratic	Dec 31, 1945	23 years, 8 days	Jan 8, 1969 – Jan 8, 1975	Later state senator (1975–1978) and Baltimore County Executive (1978–1986).
Matt Windschitl		Iowa	Republican	Dec 30, 1983	23 years, 9 days	Jan 8, 2007 – present	Later speaker pro tempore (2014–2020) and majority leader (2020–present).
Sean Garballey		Massachusetts	Democratic	Feb 22, 1985	23 years, 11 days	Mar 4, 2008 – present	
Edgar Gonzalez Jr.		Illinois	Democratic	Dec 25, 1996	23 years, 16 days	Jan 10, 2020 – present	
Robert Y. Hayne		South Carolina	Democratic-Republican	Nov 10, 1791	23 years, 18 days	Nov 28, 1814 – Dec 18, 1818	Later speaker of the state House (1818), state attorney general (1818–1822), U.S. senator (1823–1832), governor (1832–1834) and mayor of Charleston (1836–1837).
Bob Brown		Montana	Republican	Dec 11, 1947	23 years, 24 days	Jan 4, 1971 – 1974	Later state senator (1975–1997), senate president (1995–1996), state secretary of state (2001–2005) and nominee for governor (2004).
Clarence Mitchell III		Maryland	Democratic	Dec 14, 1939	23 years, 26 days	Jan 9, 1963 – 1967	Later state senator (1967–1986).
Joe Kelton Wells		Texas	Democratic	Dec 15, 1909	23 years, 26 days	Jan 10, 1933 – Jan 12, 1937	
Garrett Love		Kansas	Republican	Dec 12, 1987	23 years, 29 days	Jan 10, 2011 – Jan 9, 2017	Youngest-ever Kansas state senator.
Solomon Goldstein-Rose		Massachusetts	Democratic	Dec 5, 1993	23 years, 30 days	Jan 4, 2017 – Jan 2, 2019	Left the Democratic Party in February 2018.
Solomon Goldstein-Rose		Massachusetts	Independent	Dec 5, 1993	23 years, 30 days	Jan 4, 2017 – Jan 2, 2019	Left the Democratic Party in February 2018.
Thomas F. Grady		New York	Democratic	Nov 29, 1853	23 years, 33 days	Jan 1, 1877 – Dec 31, 1879	Later state senator (1882–1883, 1889, 1896–1912) and senate minority leader (1899–1910).
George Francis Monaghan		Michigan	Democratic	Nov 28, 1875	23 years, 37 days	Jan 4, 1899 – 1900	
Theodore W. Brevard Jr.		Florida	[?]	Aug 26, 1835	23 years, 39 days	Oct 4, 1858 – 1859	Son of state comptroller Theodorus W. Brevard. Later state senator (1865–1866).
Ben H. Butcher		West Virginia	Democratic	Oct 23, 1855	23 years, 39 days	Dec 1, 1878 – Dec 1, 1880, Dec 1, 1930 – Feb 12, 1937	Later Colorado state legislator.
George Burkman Norton		Massachusetts	Democratic	Nov 24, 1921	23 years, 40 days	Jan 3, 1945 – Jan 5, 1949	
George C. Windrow		Wisconsin	Democratic	Nov 16, 1931	23 years, 48 days	Jan 3, 1955 – Jan 7, 1957	
William DuBois		Wyoming	Republican	Nov 15, 1879	23 years, 51 days	Jan 5, 1903 – Jan 4, 1909	Later state senator (1909–1913).
Jay Hooper		Vermont	Democratic	Nov 12, 1993	23 years, 53 days	Jan 4, 2017 – present	Son of Donald M. Hooper.
David Plawecki		Michigan	Democratic	Nov 8, 1947	23 years, 54 days	Jan 1, 1971 – Jan 1, 1983	
Mike Blouin		Iowa	Democratic	Nov 7, 1945	23 years, 55 days	Jan 1, 1969 – Jan 1, 1973	Later state senator (1973–1975), U.S. representative (1975–1979) and candidate for governor (2006).
Stacey Dahl		North Dakota	Republican	Oct 7, 1981	23 years, 55 days	Dec 1, 2004 – Dec 1, 2012	
William E. Kirkpatrick		Massachusetts	Republican	Nov 12, 1901	23 years, 56 days	Jan 7, 1925 – Jan 4, 1939	
Josh Svaty		Kansas	Democratic	Nov 7, 1979	23 years, 62 days	Jan 8, 2003 – July 14, 2009	Later state secretary of agriculture (2009–2011) and candidate for governor (2018).
Theodore Roosevelt		New York	Republican	Oct 27, 1858	23 years, 66 days	Jan 1, 1882 – Dec 31, 1884	President of the United States (1901–1909). Youngest-ever U.S. president.
James D. Cole		Texas	Democratic	Nov 3, 1937	23 years, 68 days	Jan 10, 1961 – Jan 14, 1975	
Charles Royce Boss		Connecticut	Republican	Nov 1, 1871	23 years, 69 days	Jan 9, 1895 – Jan 6, 1897	
Richard Russell Jr.		Georgia	Democratic	Nov 2, 1897	23 years, 69 days	Jan 10, 1921 – Jan 12, 1931	Later governor (1931–1933), U.S. senator (1933–1971) and senate president pro tempore (1969–1971).
John C. Thompson Jr.		Wisconsin	Republican	Oct 25, 1901	23 years, 72 days	Jan 5, 1925 – Jan 3, 1927	
Anthony J. Opachen		Wisconsin	Democratic	Oct 18, 1909	23 years, 78 days	Jan 4, 1933 – Jan 9, 1935	
Arthur F. Gillen		Minnesota	Independent	Oct 10, 1919	23 years, 87 days	Jan 5, 1943 – Jan 1, 1951	Later state senator (1951–1959).
John Montgomery		Oklahoma	Republican	Aug 13, 1991	23 years, 88 days	Nov 9, 2014 – Nov 21, 2018	Later state senator (2018–2023).
Rick S. Bender		Washington	Democratic	Oct 9, 1949	23 years, 91 days	Jan 8, 1973 – Jan 10, 1983	
Ben Cardin		Maryland	Democratic	Oct 5, 1943	23 years, 92 days	Jan 5, 1967 – Jan 6, 1987	Son of Meyer Cardin. Later speaker of the state House (1979–1987), U.S. representative (1987–2007) and U.S. senator (2007–2025).
Tim Baxter		New Hampshire	Republican	Aug 31, 1997	23 years, 93 days	Dec 2, 2020 – Dec 7, 2022	
Edward Boland		Massachusetts	Democratic	Oct 1, 1911	23 years, 93 days	Jan 2, 1935 – Jan 1, 1941	Later U.S. representative (1953–1989).
Sammy D. Dalton		West Virginia	Democratic	Aug 29, 1951	23 years, 94 days	Dec 1, 1974 – Dec 1, 1986; Dec 1, 1988 – Dec 1, 1990; Dec 1, 1996 – Dec 1, 2000	Later state senator (1990–1994).
Joseph Clark Alvord		Connecticut	Republican	Oct 1, 1858	23 years, 95 days	Jan 4, 1882 – Jan 3, 1883	
Jennifer Sullivan		Florida	Republican	Aug 1, 1991	23 years, 97 days	Nov 6, 2014 – present	
Antonio Felipe		Connecticut	Democratic	Feb 2, 1996	23 years, 100 days	May 13, 2019 – present	
Wayne Gibbens		Texas	Democratic	Oct 1, 1937	23 years, 101 days	Jan 10, 1961 – Jan 7, 1966	
Selena Torres		Nevada	Democratic	Jul 27, 1995	23 years, 103 days	Nov 7, 2018 – present	
J. Keith Arnold		Florida	Democratic	Jul 21, 1959	23 years, 104 days	Nov 2, 1982 – present	
Thomas Bennett Jr.		South Carolina	Democratic-Republican	Aug 14, 1781	23 years, 104 days	Nov 26, 1804 – Nov 24, 1806, Nov 28, 1808 – Nov 26, 1810, Nov 23, 1812 – Dec 19, 1812; Sep 15, 1813 – Nov 23, 1818	Later speaker of the state House (1814–1818), state senator (1820, 1837–1840) and governor (1820–1822).
Arthur L. Padrutt		Wisconsin	Progressive	Sep 26, 1917	23 years, 104 days	Jan 8, 1941 – Jan 3, 1945	
Clementa C. Pinckney		South Carolina	Democratic	Jul 30, 1973	23 years, 104 days	Nov 11, 1996 – Nov 13, 2000	Later state senator (2000–2015).
Ramon J. Hill		California	Breckenridge Democratic	Sep 21, 1839	23 years, 106 days	Jan 5, 1863 – Dec 7, 1863	
Arthur M. Brown		Connecticut	Republican	Sep 24, 1877	23 years, 107 days	Jan 9, 1901 – Jan 7, 1903	Later state senator (1903–1905) and nominee for governor (1936).
Mary Shadow		Tennessee	Democratic	Jul 17, 1925	23 years, 108 days	Nov 2, 1948 – Nov 4, 1952	
Richard G. Beebe		Connecticut	Democratic	Sep 18, 1857	23 years, 109 days	Jan 5, 1881 – Jan 3, 1883, Jan 4, 1899 – Jan 9, 1901	
J. D. Lynch		Montana	Democratic	Sep 17, 1947	23 years, 109 days	Jan 4, 1971 – Jan 3, 1979	Later state senator (1982–2001).
Rodolphe G. Bessette		Massachusetts	Democratic	Sep 14, 1911	23 years, 110 days	Jan 2, 1935 – Jan 4, 1939; Jan 1, 1941 – Jan 3, 1951	
Hugo Black III		Florida	Democratic	Jul 15, 1953	23 years, 110 days	Nov 2, 1976 – Nov 7, 1978	Grandson of Hugo Black.
Alfred D. Clark		New Hampshire	Republican	Sep 14, 1877	23 years, 110 days	Jan 2, 1901 – [?]	
Alfred A. Minahan Jr.		Massachusetts	Democratic	Sep 14, 1953	23 years, 113 days	Jan 5, 1977 – Jan 2, 1985	
Riley Keaton		West Virginia	Republican	Aug 9, 1997	23 years, 114 days	Dec 1, 2020 – Oct 12, 2023	
Jason Mumpower		Tennessee	Republican	Sep 22, 1973	23 years, 114 days	Jan 14, 1997 – Jan 11, 2011	Later minority leader (2007–2009), majority leader (2009–2011) and state comptroller of the treasury (2021–present).
Robert L. Nardone		Massachusetts	Democratic	Sep 13, 1953	23 years, 114 days	Jan 5, 1977 – Jan 3, 1979	
Charles Finnell		Texas	Democratic	Sep 16, 1943	23 years, 116 days	Jan 10, 1967 – Jan 14, 1975, Jan 11, 1977 – Jan 12, 1999	
Daniel Pae		Oklahoma	Republican	Jul 25, 1995	23 years, 119 days	Nov 21, 2018 – present	
Clinton Kersey		Texas	Democratic	Sep 11, 1915	23 years, 121 days	Jan 10, 1939 – Jan 12, 1943	
Rudolph Tesar		Nebraska	Democratic	Sep 2, 1907	23 years, 127 days	Jan 7, 1931 – 1935	At the time the youngest-ever Nebraska state legislator.
Jonathan Karlen		Montana	Democratic	Aug 27, 1999	23 years, 128 days	Jan 2, 2023 – present	
Kerry Rich		Alabama	Republican	Jun 25, 1951	23 years, 134 days	Nov 6, 1974 – Nov 8, 1978, Nov 7, 1990 – Nov 9, 1994, Nov 3, 2010 – Nov 9, 2022	
Cedric Gates		Hawaii	Democratic	Jun 22, 1993	23 years, 139 days	Nov 8, 2016 – present	
Charles I. Quirk		Massachusetts	Democratic	Aug 15, 1871	23 years, 140 days	Jan 2, 1895 – Jan 5, 1898	Later state senator (1898–1899).
Tom Connally		Texas	Democratic	Aug 19, 1877	23 years, 142 days	Jan 8, 1901 – Jan 10, 1905	Later U.S. representative (1917–1929) and U.S. senator (1929–1953).
Caleb Ness		Maine	Republican	Jul 16, 1999	23 years, 144 days	Dec 7, 2022 – present	
Rick Quinn Jr.		South Carolina	Republican	Jun 22, 1965	23 years, 145 days	Nov 14, 1988 – Nov 8, 2004, Nov 8, 2010 – Dec 13, 2017	Later majority leader (1999–2004).
Howard W. Taylor		Connecticut	Democratic	Aug 11, 1858	23 years, 146 days	Jan 4, 1882 – Jan 3, 1883, Jan 8, 1913 – Jan 8, 1919	
John Whitmire		Texas	Democratic	Aug 13, 1949	23 years, 149 days	Jan 9, 1973 – Jan 11, 1983	Later state senator (1983–2023) and mayor of Houston (2024–present).
Charles J. Faulkner		Virginia	National Republican	Jul 6, 1806	23 years, 154 days	Dec 7, 1829 – Dec 5, 1830, Dec 5, 1831 – Dec 1, 1833, Jan 1, 1838 – Dec 4, 1842	Later state delegate (1848–1849) and U.S. representative (1851–1859, 1875–1877).
Charles J. Faulkner		Virginia	Whig	Jul 6, 1806	23 years, 154 days	Dec 7, 1829 – Dec 5, 1830, Dec 5, 1831 – Dec 1, 1833, Jan 1, 1838 – Dec 4, 1842	Later state delegate (1848–1849) and U.S. representative (1851–1859, 1875–1877).
Frederick Joseph Duff		Texas	Democratic	Aug 6, 1859	23 years, 156 days	Jan 9, 1883 – Jan 13, 1885	
Frederick L. Zimmerman		New York	Democratic	Jul 28, 1906	23 years, 157 days	Jan 1, 1930 – Dec 31, 1935	
Hugh Parmer		Texas	Democratic	Aug 3, 1939	23 years, 158 days	Jan 8, 1963 – Jan 12, 1965	Later mayor of Fort Worth (1977–1979), state senator (1983–1991), state senate president pro tempore (1990) and nominee for U.S. senator (1990).
Cornelius T. Young		Wisconsin	Democratic	Jul 28, 1907	23 years, 161 days	Jan 5, 1931 – Jan 3, 1939	Later speaker of the state House (1933–1935) and state senator (1939–1943).
Daniel J. Kiley		Massachusetts	Democratic	Jul 27, 1874	23 years, 162 days	Jan 5, 1898 – Jan 4, 1899, Jan 1, 1902 – Jan 6, 1904	
Thomas D'Alesandro Jr.		Maryland	Democratic	Aug 1, 1903	23 years, 164 days	Jan 12, 1927 – 1933	Later U.S. representative (1939–1947) and mayor of Baltimore (1947–1959).
Julian Ivey		Maryland	Democratic	Aug 3, 1995	23 years, 169 days	Jan 19, 2019 – present	Son of Glenn and Jolene Ivey.
Thomas H. Spurr Jr.		Massachusetts	Democratic	Jul 17, 1927	23 years, 170 days	Jan 3, 1951 – Jan 7, 1953	
John W. Connelly		Massachusetts	Democratic	Jul 16, 1874	23 years, 173 days	Jan 5, 1898 – Jan 4, 1899	
Hart H. North		California	Republican	Jul 12, 1871	23 years, 179 days	Jan 7, 1895 – Jan 2, 1899	
James J. Kiley		Massachusetts	Democratic	Jul 5, 1911	23 years, 181 days	Jan 2, 1935 – Jan 6, 1937	
Louis J. Lefkowitz		New York	Republican	Jul 3, 1904	23 years, 182 days	Jan 1, 1928 – Dec 31, 1930	Later state attorney general (1957–1979) and nominee for mayor of New York City (1961).
Hunter Cantrell		Minnesota	Democratic	Jul 10, 1995	23 years, 182 days	Jan 8, 2019 – Jan 5, 2021	
Melvin Ernest Nunnery		South Carolina	Democratic	May 11, 1951	23 years, 184 days	Nov 11, 1974 – Nov 8, 1982	
Jason Bedrick		New Hampshire	Republican	Jun 5, 1983	23 years, 184 days	Dec 6, 2006 – Dec 3, 2008	
Alan J. Dixon		Illinois	Democratic	Jul 7, 1927	23 years, 187 days	Jan 10, 1951 – Jan 1963	Later state senator (1963–1971), state treasurer (1971–1977), state secretary of state (1977–1981) and U.S. senator (1981–1993).
Nathaniel Macon		North Carolina	Independent	Dec 17, 1757	23 years, 188 days	Jun 23, 1781 – May 18, 1782, 1784	Later U.S. representative (1791–1815), speaker of the House (1801–1807), U.S. senator (1815–1828) and president pro tempore of the U.S. Senate (1826–1827).
Mitchel Perrizo Jr.		Minnesota	Independent	Jul 3, 1917	23 years, 188 days	Jan 7, 1941 – 1942	Member of the Democratic Party.
Claude R. Porter		Iowa	Democratic	Jul 8, 1872	23 years, 189 days	Jan 13, 1896 – Jan 8, 1900	Later state senator (1900–1904) and nominee for governor (1906, 1910, 1918) and for U.S. senator (1920, 1926).
Benjamin Charles Garside		Wisconsin	Union Labor	Jun 26, 1863	23 years, 191 days	Jan 3, 1887 – Jan 7, 1889	
John J. McDade		California	Workingmen's	Jun 27, 1856	23 years, 192 days	Jan 5, 1880 – Jan 3, 1881	Later served as sheriff of San Francisco (1893–1895).
Russ Meekins Jr.		Alaska	Democratic	Jun 29, 1949	23 years, 193 days	Jan 8, 1973 – Jan 20, 1975, Jan 10, 1977 – Jan 17, 1983	
George M. Curtis		New York	Democratic	Jun 20, 1840	23 years, 195 days	Jan 1, 1864 – Dec 31, 1864, Jan 1, 1866 – Dec 31, 1866	
Lindley Beckworth		Texas	Democratic	Jun 30, 1913	23 years, 196 days	Jan 12, 1937 – Jan 10, 1939	Later U.S. representative (1939–1953, 1957–1967) and state senator (1971–1973).
George Greene		Iowa	Democratic	Apr 15, 1817	23 years, 201 days	Nov 2, 1840 – Dec 4, 1842	
Myron Sulzberger		New York	Democratic	Jun 14, 1878	23 years, 201 days	Jan 1, 1902 – Dec 31, 1903	
Gregory G. Gruse		Michigan	Republican	Jun 20, 1961	23 years, 203 days	Jan 9, 1985 – Jan 14, 1987	
William P. Nagle Jr.		Massachusetts	Democratic	Jun 10, 1951	23 years, 205 days	Jan 1, 1975 – Jan 1, 2003	
George Nigh		Oklahoma	Democratic	Jun 9, 1927	23 years, 207 days	Jan 2, 1951 – Jan 6, 1959	Later lieutenant governor (1959–1963, 1967–1979) and governor (1963, 1979–1987).
John Paul O'Brien		Massachusetts	Democratic	Jun 10, 1937	23 years, 208 days	Jan 4, 1961 – Jan 2, 1963, Jan 6, 1965 – Jan 3, 1973	
Reuben E. Senterfitt		Texas	Democratic	Jun 18, 1917	23 years, 210 days	Jan 14, 1941 – Jan 11, 1955	Later speaker of the state House (1951–1955).
Maurice E. Atkinson		California	Democratic	Jun 2, 1915	23 years, 214 days	Jan 2, 1939 – Jan 6, 1941	
John L. Donovan		Massachusetts	Democratic	Jun 3, 1876	23 years, 214 days	Jan 3, 1900 – Jan 1, 1902, Jan 5, 1910 – Jan 4, 1911, Jan 3, 1912 – Jan 4, 1919	
Norman R. Klug		Wisconsin	Republican	Jun 9, 1905	23 years, 214 days	Jan 9, 1929 – Jan 7, 1931	
James Buchanan		Pennsylvania	Federalist	Apr 23, 1791	23 years, 222 days	Dec 1, 1814 – Dec 1, 1816	President of the United States (1857–1861)
Adam Zabner		Iowa	Democratic	May 24, 1999	23 years, 222 days	Jan 1, 2023 – present	
Hugh R. Pomeroy		California	Republican	May 29, 1899	23 years, 224 days	Jan 8, 1923 – Jan 5, 1925	
Edward Ryder		Ohio	Republican	May 4, 1948	23 years, 225 days	Dec 15, 1971 – Dec 31, 1972	
Stephen A. Douglas		Illinois	Democratic	Apr 23, 1813	23 years, 226 days	Dec 5, 1836 – [?]	U.S. senator (1847–1861) and nominee for president of the United States (1860).
Pat Grassley		Iowa	Republican	May 26, 1983	23 years, 227 days	Jan 8, 2007 – present	Grandson of Chuck Grassley. Later speaker of the state House (2020–present).
John G. Rowland		Connecticut	Republican	May 24, 1957	23 years, 228 days	Jan 7, 1981 – Jan 9, 1985	Later U.S. representative (1985–1991) and governor (1995–2004).
Aaron Schock		Illinois	Republican	May 28, 1981	23 years, 229 days	Jan 12, 2005 – Jan 3, 2009	Later U.S. representative (2009–2015).
Richard N. Gottfried		New York	Democratic	May 16, 1947	23 years, 230 days	Jan 1, 1971 – Dec 31, 2022	Longest-serving state legislator in New York history.
Richard Baker		Louisiana	Democratic	May 22, 1948	23 years, 233 days	Jan 10, 1972 – Jan 1987	Switched to the Republican Party in 1986. Later U.S. representative (1987–2008)
Richard Baker		Louisiana	Republican	May 22, 1948	23 years, 233 days	Jan 10, 1972 – Jan 1987	Switched to the Republican Party in 1986. Later U.S. representative (1987–2008)
Harry W. Haines		New Hampshire	Democratic	May 11, 1877	23 years, 236 days	Jan 2, 1901 – [?]	
J. Hamilton Lewis		Washington	Democratic	May 18, 1863	23 years, 237 days	Jan 10, 1887 – Jan 14, 1889	Later candidate for governor of Washington (1892), U.S. representative (1897–1899), candidate for governor of Illinois (1908), U.S. senator (1913–1919, 1931–1939) and nominee for governor of Illinois (1920).
J. Vander Stoep		Washington	Republican	May 20, 1957	23 years, 237 days	Jan 12, 1981 – Jan 12, 1987	
John Buckley		Connecticut	Republican	May 12, 1885	23 years, 239 days	Jan 6, 1909 – 1910; 1921–1922	
Thomas W. Ferry		Michigan	Republican	Jun 10, 1827	23 years, 240 days	Feb 5, 1851 – Jan 5, 1853	Later state senator (1857–1859), U.S. representative (1865–1871), U.S. senator (1871–1883) and president pro tempore of the U.S. Senate (1875–1879).
Steve Gunderson		Wisconsin	Republican	May 10, 1951	23 years, 241 days	Jan 6, 1975 – Jul 9, 1979	Later U.S. representative (1981–1997).
Frank D. Ryan		California	Republican	May 11, 1859	23 years, 242 days	Jan 8, 1883 – Jan 5, 1885	
Stephen M. Young		Ohio	Democratic	May 4, 1889	23 years, 242 days	Jan 1, 1913 – Jan 1, 1917	Later nominee for state attorney general (1922, 1956), U.S. representative (1933–1937, 1941–1943, 1949–1951) and U.S. senator (1959–1971).
John C. Kleczka		Wisconsin	Republican	May 6, 1885	23 years, 243 days	Jan 4, 1909 – Jan 6, 1913	
John E. Magenis		Massachusetts	Republican	May 5, 1873	23 years, 246 days	Jan 6, 1897 – Jan 4, 1899	
Maurice Bloch		New York	Democratic	Apr 26, 1891	23 years, 250 days	Jan 1, 1915 – Dec 31, 1929	Later minority leader (1924–1929).
Rubén Díaz Jr.		New York	Democratic	Apr 26, 1973	23 years, 250 days	Jan 1, 1997 – Apr 22, 2009	Son of Rubén Díaz Sr. Later borough president of the Bronx (2009–2021) and candidate for mayor of New York City (2021).
Carmine J. Marasco		New York	Democratic	Apr 26, 1891	23 years, 250 days	Jan 1, 1915 – Dec 31, 1915, Jan 1, 1935 – Dec 31, 1937, Jan 1, 1939 – Jan 14, 1941	Later state senator (1941–1944).
Tory Marie Arnberger		Kansas	Republican	May 3, 1993	23 years, 251 days	Jan 9, 2017 – present	
Bill Finkbeiner		Washington	Democratic	May 5, 1969	23 years, 251 days	Jan 11, 1993 – Jan 9, 1995	Switched to the Republican Party in 1994. Later majority leader of the state senate.
Bill Finkbeiner		Washington	Republican	May 5, 1969	23 years, 251 days	Jan 11, 1993 – Jan 9, 1995	Switched to the Republican Party in 1994. Later majority leader of the state senate.
Don Kennard		Texas	Democratic	May 6, 1929	23 years, 252 days	Jan 13, 1953 – Jan 8, 1963	Later state senator (1963–1973) and state senate president pro tempore (1969).
Daniel Thomas McCormick		New Hampshire	Republican	Apr 25, 1877	23 years, 252 days	Jan 2, 1901 – [?]	
Thomas Beadle		North Dakota	Republican	Mar 22, 1987	23 years, 254 days	Dec 1, 2010 – Dec 1, 2020	Grandson of Earl Strinden and stepson of Tony Grindberg. Later state treasurer (2021–present).
Thomas J. Clunie		California	Democratic	Mar 25, 1852	23 years, 256 days	Dec 6, 1875 – Dec 3, 1877	Later U.S. representative (1889–1891).
Michael J. McGlynn		Massachusetts	Democratic	Apr 23, 1953	23 years, 257 days	Jan 5, 1977 – Jan 3, 1988	Later mayor of Medford (1988–2016).
Joshua Adjutant		New Hampshire	Democratic	Mar 22, 1995	23 years, 258 days	Dec 5, 2018 – Apr 1, 2023	
John W. Costello		Massachusetts	Democratic	Apr 20, 1927	23 years, 258 days	Jan 3, 1951 – Jan 3, 1961	Later member of the governor's council (1961–1965).
Otto Kotouc Sr.		Nebraska	Democratic	Apr 22, 1885	23 years, 259 days	Jan 5, 1909 – Jan 7, 1913	
Skyler Wheeler		Iowa	Republican	Apr 24, 1993	23 years, 260 days	Jan 9, 2017 – present	
John J. O'Connor		Massachusetts	Democratic	Apr 12, 1871	23 years, 265 days	Jan 2, 1895 – Jan 6, 1897	
Oscar Raymond Luhring		Indiana	Republican	Feb 11, 1879	23 years, 267 days	Nov 5, 1902 – Nov 9, 1904	Later U.S. representative (1919–1923).
Martin J. Schreiber		Wisconsin	Democratic	Apr 8, 1939	23 years, 268 days	Jan 1, 1963 – Jan 1, 1971	Youngest-ever Wisconsin state senator. Son of Martin E. Schreiber. Later lieutenant governor (1971–1977), governor (1977–1979) and candidate for mayor of Milwaukee (1988).
Augustus F. Jewett Jr.		California	Republican	Apr 9, 1903	23 years, 269 days	Jan 3, 1927 – Jan 2, 1933	
Henry Byron Noyes Jr.		Connecticut	Republican	Apr 15, 1871	23 years, 269 days	Jan 9, 1895 – Jan 6, 1897	
Peter Shapiro		New Jersey	Democratic	Apr 18, 1952	23 years, 270 days	Jan 13, 1976 – Jan 1979	Later Essex County Executive (1979–1987) and nominee for governor (1985).
Philip Erdman		Nebraska	Republican	Apr 7, 1977	23 years, 271 days	Jan 3, 2001 – Jan 7, 2009	
Johnny Olszewski		Maryland	Democratic	Sep 10, 1982	23 years, 275 days	Jun 12, 2006 – Jan 14, 2015	Youngest-ever chairman of the Baltimore County Delegation. Later Baltimore County Executive (2019–2025) and U.S. representative (2025–present)
Nabeela Syed		Illinois	Democratic	Apr 10, 1999	23 years, 276 days	Jan 11, 2023 – present	
Casey Kozlowski		Ohio	Republican	Mar 31, 1987	23 years, 278 days	Jan 3, 2011 – Dec 31, 2012	
Niraj Antani		Ohio	Republican	Feb 26, 1991	23 years, 279 days	Dec 2, 2014 – Dec 31, 2020	Later state senator (2021–present).
John A. Murphy		Wisconsin	Republican	Mar 28, 1863	23 years, 281 days	Jan 3, 1887 – Jan 7, 1889	
John Joseph Linehan		Massachusetts	Democratic	Mar 26, 1933	23 years, 282 days	Jan 2, 1957 – Jan 4, 1961	
Harold Lloyd Murphy		Georgia	Democratic	Mar 31, 1927	23 years, 283 days	Jan 8, 1951 – Jan 9, 1961	
Torrey Westrom		Minnesota	Republican	Mar 27, 1973	23 years, 286 days	Jan 7, 1997 – Jan 7, 2013	Later state senator (2013–present).
Corey Mock		North Dakota	Democratic	Feb 17, 1985	23 years, 288 days	Dec 1, 2008 – present	Later minority leader (2014–2018).
Anton N. Moursund		Texas	Democratic	Mar 26, 1877	23 years, 288 days	Jan 8, 1901 – Jan 13, 1903	Son of Albert Wadel Hansen Moursund.
Harry H. Ham		Massachusetts	Republican	Mar 16, 1883	23 years, 292 days	Jan 2, 1907 – Jan 4, 1911	
Wesley C. Uhlman		Washington	Democratic	Mar 23, 1935	23 years, 295 days	Jan 12, 1959 – Jan 9, 1967	Later state senator (1967–1969) and mayor of Seattle (1969–1978).
Henry Converse Atwill		Massachusetts	Republican	Mar 11, 1872	23 years, 296 days	Jan 1, 1896 – Jan 4, 1899	Later state senator (1899–1901) and state attorney general (1915–1919).
Elizabeth M. Tamposi		New Hampshire	Republican	Feb 13, 1955	23 years, 296 days	Dec 6, 1978 – Dec 3, 1986	Later assistant secretary of state for consular affairs (1989–1992).
Tony Korioth		Texas	Democratic	Mar 16, 1933	23 years, 298 days	Jan 8, 1957 – Sep 10, 1961	
Richard A. Westman		Vermont	Republican	Mar 13, 1959	23 years, 298 days	Jan 5, 1983 – Jan 2009	Later state senator (2011–present).
Wayne Stenehjem		North Dakota	Republican	Feb 5, 1953	23 years, 300 days	Dec 1, 1976 – Dec 1, 1980	Later state senator (1980–2000) and state attorney general (2000–2022).
Charles S. Fairfax		California	Democratic	Mar 8, 1829	23 years, 301 days	Jan 3, 1853 – Jan 1, 1855	Later speaker of the Assembly (1854–1855).
Thomas Settle		North Carolina	Democratic	Jan 23, 1831	23 years, 301 days	Nov 20, 1854 – Nov 19, 1860	Later speaker of the state House (1858–1860).
Archibald A. Stone Jr.		Minnesota	Independent	Mar 7, 1893	23 years, 301 days	Jan 2, 1917 – Jan 6, 1919	
Nicholas Paleologos		Massachusetts	Democratic	Mar 9, 1953	23 years, 302 days	Jan 5, 1977 – Jan 1, 1991	
Andrew Stein		New York	Democratic	Mar 4, 1945	23 years, 303 days	Jan 1, 1969 – Dec 31, 1972	Later borough president of Manhattan (1978–1985) and president of the New York City Council (1986–1994).
Thomas Golden Jr.		Massachusetts	Democratic	Mar 5, 1971	23 years, 305 days	Jan 4, 1995 – May 26, 2022	Later city manager of Lowell (2022–present).
William J. Pennock		Washington	Democratic	Mar 10, 1915	23 years, 305 days	Jan 9, 1939 – Jan 13, 1947	Priorly member of the Communist Party. Later co-founder of the state Progressive Party (1948).
Harry G. Slater		Wisconsin	Republican	Mar 6, 1905	23 years, 307 days	Jan 7, 1929 – Jan 5, 1931	
Victor Ashe		Tennessee	Republican	Jan 1, 1945	23 years, 309 days	Nov 5, 1968 – Nov 5, 1974	Later nominee for U.S. senator (1984) and mayor of Knoxville (1987–2003).
Olaf C. Olsen		Wisconsin	Socialist	Feb 26, 1899	23 years, 311 days	Jan 3, 1923 – Jan 3, 1927	
Dorothy Bradley		Montana	Democratic	Feb 24, 1947	23 years, 315 days	Jan 5, 1971 – Jan 3, 1979, Jan 7, 1985 – Jan 4, 1993	Later nominee for governor (1992).
David Lowry Swain		North Carolina	Independent	Jan 4, 1801	23 years, 316 days	Nov 15, 1824 – Jan 8, 1830	Later governor (1832–1835).
David Beasley		South Carolina	Democratic	Feb 26, 1957	23 years, 318 days	Jan 9, 1981 – Jan 10, 1995	Switched to the Republican Party in 1991. Later governor (1995–1999) and executive director of the World Food Programme (2017–present).
David Beasley		South Carolina	Republican	Feb 26, 1957	23 years, 318 days	Jan 9, 1981 – Jan 10, 1995	Switched to the Republican Party in 1991. Later governor (1995–1999) and executive director of the World Food Programme (2017–present).
Kaniela Ing		Hawaii	Democratic	Dec 24, 1988	23 years, 319 days	Nov 7, 2012 – Nov 6, 2018	
Arturo Alonso		Oklahoma	Democratic	Jan 7, 1999	23 years, 320 days	Nov 23, 2022 – present	
Jeffrey D. Padden		Michigan	Democratic	Feb 22, 1951	23 years, 320 days	Jan 8, 1975 – Jan 1985	
Jesse K. Dubois		Illinois	Whig	Jan 14, 1811	23 years, 321 days	Dec 1, 1834 – 1840, Dec 4, 1842 – 1844	Later state auditor of public accounts (1857–1864).
Frank D. Nicol		California	Democratic	Feb 17, 1859	23 years, 325 days	Jan 8, 1883 – Jan 5, 1885	
Peter Snowe		Maine	Republican	Jan 16, 1943	23 years, 325 days	Dec 7, 1966 – Apr 10, 1973	
Patrick N. Hogan		Maryland	Republican	Feb 15, 1979	23 years, 327 days	Jan 8, 2003 – Jan 10, 2007; Jan 12, 2011 – Jan 14, 2015	
James Manley Head		Texas	Democratic	Feb 16, 1909	23 years, 329 days	Jan 10, 1933 – Jan 12, 1937	Later state senator (1937–1941).
William T. Barry		Kentucky	Democratic-Republican	Feb 5, 1784	23 years, 330 days	Jan 1, 1808 – [?]	Later U.S. representative (1810–1811), U.S. senator (1815–1816), state senator (1817–1821), lieutenant governor (1820–1824), commonwealth secretary of state (1824–1825), Democratic Party nominee for governor (1828) and U.S. postmaster general (1829–1835).
James Jackson		Georgia	Independent	Sep 21, 1757	23 years, 330 days	Aug 17, 1781 – 1783, Jan 4, 1785 – 1787, Jan 12, 1796 – 1798	Later governor-elect (1788, declined the position), U.S. representative (1789–1791), U.S. senator (1793–1795, 1801–1806) and governor (1798–1801).
James Jackson		Georgia	Democratic-Republican	Sep 21, 1757	23 years, 330 days	Aug 17, 1781 – 1783, Jan 4, 1785 – 1787, Jan 12, 1796 – 1798	Later governor-elect (1788, declined the position), U.S. representative (1789–1791), U.S. senator (1793–1795, 1801–1806) and governor (1798–1801).
Donald L. Kimball		Iowa	Republican	Feb 15, 1933	23 years, 334 days	Jan 14, 1957 – Jan 8, 1961	
John McCandish King		Illinois	Republican	Feb 15, 1927	23 years, 334 days	Jan 15, 1951 – Jan 15, 1957	
Bob Giersdorf		Alaska	Democratic	Feb 24, 1935	23 years, 336 days	Jan 26, 1959 – Jan 29, 1960, Feb 2, 1960 – Jan 23, 1961	
Rayford Price		Texas	Democratic	Feb 9, 1937	23 years, 336 days	Jan 10, 1961 – Jan 9, 1973	Later speaker of the state House (1972–1973).
James Monroe		Virginia	Independent	Apr 28, 1758	23 years, 338 days	Apr 1, 1782 – May 5, 1783, Oct 15, 1787 – Oct 19, 1789, Dec 3, 1810 – Jan 16, 1811	Founding Father of the United States and U.S. President
Marilinda Garcia		New Hampshire	Republican	Jan 1, 1983	23 years, 339 days	Dec 6, 2006 – Dec 3, 2008, Apr 29, 2009 – Dec 2, 2014	
Kylie Oversen		North Dakota	Democratic	Feb 3, 1989	23 years, 340 days	Jan 8, 2013 – Dec 5, 2016	Elected Chair of the North Dakota Democratic-NPL at 26, making her the youngest U.S. state party chair at the time.
Jonathan Kreiss-Tomkins		Alaska	Democratic	Feb 7, 1989	23 years, 343 days	Jan 15, 2013 – Jan 17, 2023	
Walker Hines		Louisiana	Democratic	Jan 31, 1984	23 years, 348 days	Jan 14, 2008 – Jan 9, 2012	Switched to the Republican Party in November 2010.
Walker Hines		Louisiana	Republican	Jan 31, 1984	23 years, 348 days	Jan 14, 2008 – Jan 9, 2012	Switched to the Republican Party in November 2010.
Joe B. Cannon		Texas	Democratic	Jan 29, 1935	23 years, 349 days	Jan 13, 1959 – Jan 12, 1965	
Littleton Waller Tazewell		Virginia	Democratic-Republican	Dec 17, 1774	23 years, 351 days	Dec 3, 1798 – Dec 7, 1801, Dec 3, 1804 – Dec 1, 1806, Nov 11, 1816 – Dec 1, 1817	Son of Henry Tazewell. Later U.S. representative (1800–1801), U.S. senator (1824–1832), president pro tempore of the U.S. Senate (1832) and governor (1834–1836).
Carleton Fulbright		Missouri	Democratic	Jan 15, 1911	23 years, 352 days	Jan 2, 1935 – 1937	Since Fulbright was not yet 24 years old, his swearing-in was in violation of the state constitution's age requirement.
Ibra Charles Blackwood		South Carolina	Democratic	Nov 21, 1878	23 years, 354 days	Nov 10, 1902 – Nov 12, 1906	Later governor (1931–1935).
John Zampieri		Vermont	Democratic	Jan 19, 1941	23 years, 353 days	Jan 6, 1965 – Jan 14, 1985	
Serranus Clinton Hastings		Iowa	Democratic	Nov 22, 1814	23 years, 355 days	Nov 12, 1838 – Nov 1, 1840	Later legislative councillor (1840–1846), U.S. representative (1846–1847) and attorney general of California (1852–1854).
Jeff Johnston		Oklahoma	Democratic	Jan 16, 1951	23 years, 356 days	Jan 7, 1975 – Jan 2, 1979	Later state senator (1979–1982).
Paul Haring		Texas	Democratic	Jan 18, 1937	23 years, 358 days	Jan 10, 1961 – Jan 10, 1967	Later switched to the Republican Party.
Blake Carpenter		Kansas	Republican	Jan 14, 1991	23 years, 363 days	Jan 12, 2015 – present	Later speaker pro tempore (2023–present).
William Van Ness Bay		Missouri	Democratic	Nov 23, 1818	23 years, 363 days	Nov 21, 1842 – Dec 25, 1848	Younger brother of Samuel M. Bay. Later U.S. representative (1849–1851).
Robert Robinson		Massachusetts	Democratic	Jan 4, 1889	23 years, 363 days	Jan 1, 1913 – Jan 5, 1916	
Avery Anderson		Kansas	Republican	1997	23 years	Jan 11, 2021 – present	
William W. Cuthbert		California	Workingmen's	1856	23 years	Jan 5, 1880 – Jan 3, 1881	
Mark S. DeFrancesco		Connecticut	Democratic	Dec 1949	23 years	Jan 3, 1973 – Jan 8, 1975	
Jim Donnelly		Maine	Republican	1967	23 years	Dec 5, 1990 – Dec 2, 1998	
Wilfred A. Duquette		Connecticut	Democratic	1905	23 years	Jan 9, 1929 – Jan 7, 1931	
Charles C. Hoskins		Connecticut	Democratic	1863	23 years	Jan 5, 1887 – Jan 9, 1889	
Karen Kilgarin		Nebraska	Democratic	1957	23 years	Jan 7, 1981 – 1984	At the time the youngest-ever female Nebraska legislator.
Maynard J. Kirby		Connecticut	Democratic	1925	23 years	Jan 5, 1949 – Jan 3, 1951	
James E. Murphy		California	Democratic	1846	23 years	Dec 6, 1869 – Dec 4, 1871	
Albert Phillips		Connecticut	Democratic	1887	23 years	Jan 4, 1911 – Jan 8, 1913	Later secretary of the state (1913–1915).
Francis J. Pizzo		Connecticut	Democratic	1925	23 years	Jan 5, 1949 – Jan 3, 1951	
Vincent A. Roberti		Connecticut	Democratic	1953	23 years	Jan 5, 1977 – Jan 9, 1985	
Jackson Sayama		Hawaii	Democratic	1997	23 years	Nov 3, 2020 – Nov 3, 2026	Later state senator (Nov 2026 to present).
Corbin Sullivan		Washington	Democratic	1911	23 years	Jan 14, 1935 – Jan 11, 1937	
Katie Zolnikov		Montana	Republican	1997	23 years	Oct 5, 2020 – present	Appointed following the resignation of her husband Daniel.
Philip Ludwell Jr.		Virginia	Independent	1672	23–24 years	1696 – 1697, 1698 – 1700	Son of Philip Ludwell.
Charles Cotesworth Pinckney		South Carolina	Independent	Feb 25, 1746	23–24 years	1770 – [?]	Son of Charles Pinckney. Later state senator, Federalist nominee for vice president of the United States (1800) and Federalist nominee for president of the United States (1804, 1808).
Christopher Robinson		Virginia	Independent	1681	23–24 years	1705 – 1715	Son of Christopher Robinson.
Joseph Medill Patterson		Illinois	Republican	Jan 6, 1879	24 years, 1 day	Jan 7, 1903 – Jan 4, 1905	Grandson of Joseph Medill.
T. Emmet Clarie		Connecticut	Democratic	Jan 1, 1913	24 years, 5 days	Jan 6, 1937 – Jan 6, 1943	
John Philip Lanergan		Massachusetts	Democratic	Dec 30, 1874	24 years, 5 days	Jan 4, 1899 – Jan 2, 1901	
Phil Cates		Texas	Democratic	Jan 6, 1947	24 years, 6 days	Jan 12, 1971 – Jan 9, 1979	
Joe Alexander		New Hampshire	Republican	Nov 28, 1994	24 years, 7 days	Dec 5, 2018 – present	
Greg Jergeson		Montana	Democratic	Dec 29, 1950	24 years, 8 days	Jan 6, 1975 – Jan 5, 1981, Jan 5, 1987 – Jan 6, 2003, Jan 7, 2013 – Jan 2, 2017	
William Christopher Lunney		Massachusetts	Democratic	Dec 24, 1910	24 years, 9 days	Jan 2, 1935 – Jan 1, 1947	
James Vernon Lea		Texas	Democratic	Jan 12, 1850	24 years, 11 days	Jan 23, 1874 – Apr 18, 1876	
George N. McKendry		Connecticut	Democratic	Dec 25, 1890	24 years, 12 days	Jan 6, 1915 – Jan 3, 1917	
Joseph McGrath		Massachusetts	Democratic	Dec 20, 1890	24 years, 17 days	Jan 6, 1915 – Jan 1, 1919	Later Boston City Councilor (1926–1928, 1930–1936), president of the Boston City Council (1931, 1933), chair of the state Democratic Party (1935–1939) and Collector of Customs for the Port of Boston (1938–1943).
James B. Adams		Texas	Democratic	Dec 21, 1926	24 years, 19 days	Jan 9, 1951 – Aug 6, 1951	
Richard Mentor Johnson		Kentucky	Democratic-Republican	Oct 17, 1780	24 years, 20 days	Nov 6, 1804 – Nov 4, 1806, Dec 30, 1841 – Dec 29, 1843; Nov 5, 1850 – Nov 19, 1850	Later U.S. representative (1807–1819, 1829–1837), U.S. senator (1819–1829) and vice president (1837–1841). Joined the Democratic Party in 1828.
Richard Mentor Johnson		Kentucky	Democratic	Oct 17, 1780	24 years, 20 days	Nov 6, 1804 – Nov 4, 1806, Dec 30, 1841 – Dec 29, 1843; Nov 5, 1850 – Nov 19, 1850	Later U.S. representative (1807–1819, 1829–1837), U.S. senator (1819–1829) and vice president (1837–1841). Joined the Democratic Party in 1828.
Jim Wright		Texas	Democratic	Dec 22, 1922	24 years, 23 days	Jan 14, 1947 – Jan 11, 1949	Later U.S. representative (1955–1989) and speaker of the U.S. House (1987–1989).
Jack Brooks		Texas	Democratic	Dec 18, 1922	24 years, 27 days	Jan 14, 1947 – Jan 9, 1951	Later U.S. representative (1953–1995).
Tip O'Neill		Massachusetts	Democratic	Dec 9, 1912	24 years, 28 days	Jan 6, 1937 – Jan 7, 1953	Later speaker of the state House (1949–1953), U.S. representative (1953–1987) and speaker of the U.S. House (1977–1987).
Boies Penrose		Pennsylvania	Republican	Nov 1, 1860	24 years, 30 days	Dec 1, 1884 – Dec 1, 1886	Grandson of Charles B. Penrose. Later state senator (1886–1897), state senate president pro tempore (1889–1891), U.S. senator (1897–1921) and chair of the state Republican Party (1903–1905).
Cathy Zeuske		Wisconsin	Republican	Dec 4, 1958	24 years, 30 days	Jan 3, 1983 – Jan 7, 1991	Later state treasurer (1991–1995) and secretary of the state department of revenue (1996–2001).
Steven Foti		Wisconsin	Republican	Dec 3, 1958	24 years, 31 days	Jan 3, 1983 – Jan 3, 2005	
John P. Burke		Massachusetts	Democratic	Dec 2, 1954	24 years, 32 days	Jan 3, 1979 – Jan 1, 1991	
James Sturch		Arkansas	Republican	Dec 8, 1990	24 years, 35 days	Jan 12, 2015 – Jan 14, 2019	Later state senator (2019–present)
Jesse T. George		Texas	Democratic	Dec 7, 1940	24 years, 36 days	Jan 12, 1965 – Sep 5, 1967	
William Hunter		Rhode Island	Federalist	Nov 26, 1774	24 years, 36 days	Jan 1, 1799 – 1812, 1823 – 1825	Later U.S. senator (1811–1821).
Jim Lord		Minnesota	Democratic	Nov 26, 1948	24 years, 38 days	Jan 3, 1973 – Jan 7, 1975	Later state treasurer (1975–1983), becoming the youngest-ever Minnesota state constitutional officer.
Bill Gardner		New Hampshire	Democratic	Oct 26, 1948	24 years, 41 days	Dec 6, 1972 – Dec 1, 1976	Later state secretary of state (1976–2022).
Patrick William Nee		Massachusetts	Democratic	Nov 22, 1938	24 years, 41 days	Jan 2, 1963 – Jan 4, 1967	
Linford Fenn Root		Connecticut	Democratic	Nov 22, 1868	24 years, 43 days	Jan 4, 1893 – Jan 9, 1895	
Joseph J. Norton		Massachusetts	Democratic	Nov 19, 1870	24 years, 44 days	Jan 2, 1895 – Jan 6, 1897	
Amos Percy Scarborough		Texas	Democratic	Nov 27, 1908	24 years, 44 days	Jan 10, 1933 – Jan 12, 1937	
Franklin Pierce		New Hampshire	Democratic	Nov 23, 1804	24 years, 45 days	Jan 7, 1829 – Jan 2, 1833	President of the United States (1853–1857). At the time the youngest-ever U.S. president.
Emily Virgin		Oklahoma	Democratic	Oct 1, 1986	24 years, 47 days	Nov 17, 2010 – Nov 16, 2022	Later minority leader (2018–2022).
Mary Landrieu		Louisiana	Democratic	Nov 23, 1955	24 years, 52 days	Jan 14, 1980 – Jan 1988	Daughter of Moon Landrieu. Later U.S. senator (1997–2015).
Lewis Cass		Ohio	Democratic-Republican	Oct 9, 1782	24 years, 53 days	Dec 1, 1806 – 1807	Later governor of the Territory of Michigan (1813–1831), Secretary of War (1831–1836), U.S. senator (1845–1848, 1849–1857), Democratic Party nominee for president of the United States (1848), president pro tempore of the U.S. Senate (1854) and Secretary of State (1857–1860).
Laurence M. Keitt		South Carolina	Democratic	Oct 4, 1824	24 years, 54 days	Nov 27, 1848 – Mar 3, 1853	Later U.S. representative (1853–1856, 1856–1860) and member of the Provisional Congress of the Confederate States (1861–1862).
Ben Adamowski		Illinois	Democratic	Nov 20, 1906	24 years, 55 days	Jan 14, 1931 – Jan 8, 1941	Later candidate for U.S. senator (1940), candidate for mayor of Chicago (1955) and Republican Party nominee for mayor of Chicago (1963).
Theodore A. Glynn		Massachusetts	Democratic	Nov 8, 1881	24 years, 56 days	Jan 3, 1906 – Jan 2, 1907	Later candidate for mayor of Boston (1925).
Chuck Schumer		New York	Democratic	Nov 3, 1950	24 years, 59 days	Jan 1, 1975 – Dec 31, 1980	Later U.S. representative (1981–1999) and U.S. senator (1999–present).
Robert H. M. Davidson		Florida	Democratic	Sep 23, 1832	24 years, 62 days	Nov 24, 1856 – Nov 26, 1860	Later state senator (1860–1862) and U.S. representative (1877–1891).
Otis Theodore Dunagan		Texas	Democratic	Nov 9, 1908	24 years, 62 days	Jan 10, 1933 – Jan 12, 1937	
J. Chris Newton		Tennessee	Republican	Nov 9, 1970	24 years, 62 days	Jan 10, 1995 – Sep 1, 2005	
Cornelius H. Toland		Massachusetts	Democratic	Nov 2, 1868	24 years, 63 days	Jan 4, 1893 – Jan 2, 1895	
C. Frank Hitchcock		Connecticut	Republican	Oct 31, 1924	24 years, 66 days	Jan 5, 1949 – Jan 5, 1955	
Margaret Coughlin		Washington	Democratic	Nov 5, 1912	24 years, 67 days	Jan 11, 1937 – Jan 9, 1939	
Charles Henry Brown		Connecticut	[?]	Oct 28, 1857	24 years, 68 days	Jan 4, 1882 – Jan 3, 1883	
David Berger		Wisconsin	Democratic	Oct 27, 1946	24 years, 69 days	Jan 4, 1971 – Jan 6, 1975	
John Gard		Wisconsin	Republican	Aug 3, 1963	24 years, 70 days	Oct 12, 1987 – Jan 3, 2007	Later speaker of the state House (2003–2007).
Andy Vargas		Massachusetts	Democratic	Sep 3, 1993	24 years, 73 days	Nov 15, 2017 – present	
Terry Miller		Alaska	Republican	Nov 10, 1942	24 years, 74 days	Jan 23, 1967 – Jan 10, 1977	
Coleman Young II		Michigan	Democratic	Oct 18, 1982	24 years, 75 days	Jan 1, 2007 – Jan 1, 2011	Son of Coleman Young. Later candidate for mayor of Detroit (2009, 2017) and state senator (2011–2019).
Conrad Hilton		New Mexico	Republican	Dec 25, 1887	24 years, 77 days	Mar 11, 1912 – 1916	
John J. Crittenden		Kentucky	Democratic-Republican	Sep 10, 1787	24 years, 83 days	Dec 2, 1811 – 1817	Later U.S. senator (appointed in 1814, at which point he was too young; served 1817–1819, 1835–1841, 1842–1848, 1855–1861), nominee for Supreme Court justice (1828–1829), U.S. attorney general (1841, 1850–1853), governor (1848–1850) and U.S. representative (1861–1863).
Abner Arrasmith		Kansas	Republican	Oct 15, 1844	24 years, 88 days	Jan 11, 1869 – Jan 9, 1871	
Gregory Mayhew		Massachusetts	Republican	Sep 19, 1945	24 years, 88 days	Dec 16, 1969 – Jan 3, 1973	Succeeded his deceased father Benjamin in office.
Edmund Dinis		Massachusetts	Democratic	Oct 4, 1924	24 years, 93 days	Jan 5, 1949 – 1951	Later state senator (1953–1957).
Arthur A. Wendering		California	Republican	Oct 5, 1894	24 years, 93 days	Jan 6, 1919 – Jan 8, 1923	
Brian Dempsey		Massachusetts	Democratic	Sep 30, 1966	24 years, 94 days	Jan 2, 1991 – July 19, 2017	
Dave Obey		Wisconsin	Democratic	Oct 3, 1938	24 years, 96 days	Jan 7, 1963 – Apr 1, 1969	Later U.S. representative (1969–2011).
Patrick Rose		Texas	Democratic	Oct 10, 1978	24 years, 96 days	Jan 14, 2003 – Jan 11, 2011	
Lawrence W. Ledvina		Wisconsin	Republican	Sep 28, 1880	24 years, 97 days	Jan 3, 1905 – Jan 3, 1911	
John P. McCormally		Kansas	Democratic	Oct 8, 1922	24 years, 97 days	Jan 13, 1947 – Jan 10, 1949	
John P. Varda		Wisconsin	Progressive	Oct 1, 1916	24 years, 97 days	Jan 6, 1941 – Jan 4, 1943	
Dewey Young		Texas	Democratic	Oct 3, 1898	24 years, 98 days	Jan 9, 1923 – Jan 10, 1933	
Stephen McGrail		Massachusetts	Democratic	Sep 23, 1948	24 years, 102 days	Jan 3, 1973 – Jan 4, 1977	
Joseph Edward Duffy		Massachusetts	Democratic	Sep 25, 1912	24 years, 103 days	Jan 6, 1937 – Jan 4, 1939; Jan 1, 1947 – Jan 5, 1949	
Steven Zirnkilton		Maine	Republican	Aug 18, 1958	24 years, 105 days	Dec 1, 1982 – Dec 5, 1988, Dec 2, 1992 – Dec 7, 1994	
William F. Galvin		Massachusetts	Democratic	Sep 17, 1950	24 years, 106 days	Jan 1, 1975 – Jan 2, 1991	Later secretary of the commonwealth (1995–present).
Walter Frank Woodul		Texas	Democratic	Sep 25, 1892	24 years, 106 days	Jan 9, 1917 – Sep 29, 1917	Later state senator (1929–1935), state senate president pro tempore (1933) and lieutenant governor (1935–1939).
Peter D. Bear		Wisconsin	Democratic	Sep 18, 1952	24 years, 107 days	Jan 3, 1977 – Jan 3, 1979	Later state senator (1979–1981).
Charles King		New York	Federalist	Mar 16, 1789	24 years, 107 days	Jul 1, 1813 – Jun 30, 1814	Son of Rufus King.
Elisha C. Andrews		New Hampshire	Democratic	Sep 16, 1876	24 years, 108 days	Jan 2, 1901 – [?]	
Melanie Stambaugh		Washington	Republican	Sep 25, 1990	24 years, 109 days	Jan 12, 2015 – Jan 14, 2019	
Zach Brown		Montana	Democratic	Sep 18, 1990	24 years, 110 days	Jan 6, 2015 – Jan 4, 2021	
Ed Kacir		Texas	Democratic	Sep 23, 1896	24 years, 110 days	Jan 11, 1921 – Jan 9, 1923	
William G. Arvanitis		Massachusetts	Republican	Sep 16, 1946	24 years, 112 days	Jan 6, 1971 – Jan 3, 1973	
Milton Marks Sr.		California	Republican	Sep 17, 1892	24 years, 113 days	Jan 8, 1917 – Jan 6, 1919	
John W. Hartmann		New Jersey	Republican	Sep 22, 1967	24 years, 114 days	Jan 14, 1992 – Jan 11, 1994	
Grant Harrison Shaft		North Dakota	Republican	Aug 9, 1962	24 years, 114 days	Dec 1, 1986 – Dec 1, 1990	
John J. Gilbride		Massachusetts	Democratic	Sep 14, 1889	24 years, 115 days	Jan 7, 1914 – Jan 5, 1916	
J. Herman Tubbs		Connecticut	Republican	Sep 14, 1859	24 years, 117 days	Jan 9, 1884 – Jan 7, 1885	
David S. Day		Connecticut	Republican	Sep 8, 1880	24 years, 118 days	Jan 4, 1905 – Jan 9, 1907	
Bill Keating		Massachusetts	Democratic	Sep 6, 1952	24 years, 119 days	Jan 3, 1977 – Jan 3, 1985	Later state senator (1985–1999) and U.S. representative (2011–present).
Cynthia Lummis		Wyoming	Republican	Sep 10, 1954	24 years, 120 days	Jan 8, 1979 – Jan 3, 1983, Jan 7, 1985 – Jan 14, 1993	Later state senator (1993–1995), state treasurer (1999–2007), U.S. representative (2009–2017) and U.S. senator (2021–present).
Isaac Kinsey Wilson		Iowa	Republican	Sep 12, 1867	24 years, 121 days	Jan 11, 1892 – Jan 7, 1894	
Melvin Laird		Wisconsin	Republican	Sep 1, 1922	24 years, 122 days	Jan 1, 1947 – Jan 1, 1953	Succeeded his deceased father in office, becoming the youngest-ever Wisconsin state senator. Later U.S. representative (1953–1969), U.S. secretary of defense (1969–1973) and White House domestic affairs advisor (1973–1974).
Bruce E. Wetherbee		Massachusetts	Democratic	Sep 1, 1950	24 years, 122 days	Jan 1, 1975 – Jan 1, 1985	
Edward Johnstone		Iowa	Democratic	Jul 4, 1815	24 years, 123 days	Nov 4, 1839 – Nov 1, 1840	Later territorial councilor (1840–1842).
Dave Norman Vigneault		Massachusetts	Democratic	Sep 3, 1936	24 years, 123 days	Jan 4, 1961 – Jan 6, 1971	
Martin Sennet Conner		Mississippi	Democratic	Aug 31, 1891	24 years, 126 days	Jan 4, 1916 – Jan 1924	Later governor (1932–1936)
M. J. Hurley		California	Democratic	Aug 29, 1868	24 years, 126 days	Jan 2, 1893 – Jan 7, 1895	
Thomas P. White		Massachusetts	Democratic	Aug 27, 1950	24 years, 127 days	Jan 1, 1975 – Jan 6, 1987	Later state senator (1987–1991).
Benjamin F. Williamson		Arkansas	Democratic	Sep 5, 1856	24 years, 127 days	Jan 10, 1881 – [?]	
Martin Thomas Reilly		Massachusetts	Democratic	Sep 1, 1956	24 years, 128 days	Jan 7, 1981 – Jan 4, 1989	
Joseph P. Cooney		Connecticut	Democratic	Aug 30, 1906	24 years, 130 days	Jan 7, 1931 – Jan 9, 1935, Jan 6, 1937 – Jan 6, 1943	
Alisha Thomas Morgan		Georgia	Democratic	Sep 5, 1978	24 years, 130 days	Jan 13, 2003 – Jan 12, 2015	
Bill Tippen		Texas	Democratic	Sep 6, 1922	24 years, 130 days	Jan 14, 1947 – Jan 9, 1951	Later state senator (1972–1973).
Mark Clodfelter		Michigan	Democratic	Aug 23, 1950	24 years, 131 days	Jan 1, 1975 – 1980	
Justin Simmons		Pennsylvania	Republican	Aug 26, 1986	24 years, 131 days	Jan 4, 2011 – Jan 5, 2021	
Anesa Kajtazović		Iowa	Democratic	Aug 30, 1986	24 years, 133 days	Jan 10, 2011 – Jan 11, 2015	
Joe Fitzgibbon		Washington	Democratic	Aug 27, 1986	24 years, 136 days	Jan 10, 2011 – present	
Shane Broadway		Arkansas	Democratic	Aug 30, 1972	24 years, 136 days	Jan 13, 1997 – Jan 13, 2003	Later speaker of the state House (2001–2003; youngest-ever speaker of the Arkansas House), state senator (2003–2011) and nominee for lieutenant governor (2010).
Herman M. Albert		New York	Democratic	Aug 15, 1901	24 years, 139 days	Jan 1, 1926 – Dec 31, 1933	
Edward M. Day		Connecticut	Republican	Aug 20, 1872	24 years, 139 days	Jan 6, 1897 – Jan 4, 1899	
Byron C. Ostby		Wisconsin	Republican	Aug 17, 1924	24 years, 139 days	Jan 3, 1949 – Jan 3, 1951	
Gary W. Laidig		Minnesota	Republican	Aug 15, 1948	24 years, 140 days	Jan 2, 1973 – Jan 3, 1983	Later state senator (1983–2001).
George Peddy		Texas	Democratic	Aug 22, 1892	24 years, 140 days	Jan 9, 1917 – Sep 10, 1917	Later candidate for U.S. senator (1922, 1948).
Kurt Zwikl		Pennsylvania	Democratic	Jun 28, 1949	24 years, 140 days	Nov 15, 1973 – Nov 30, 1984	
Truett Latimer		Texas	Democratic	Aug 23, 1928	24 years, 143 days	Jan 13, 1953 – Jan 8, 1963	
Earl Blumenauer		Oregon	Democratic	Aug 16, 1948	24 years, 145 days	Jan 8, 1973 – Jan 1, 1979	Later U.S. representative (1996–present).
Darrell Hanson		Iowa	Republican	Aug 8, 1954	24 years, 146 days	Jan 1, 1979 – Jan 1, 1995	
Fred B. Balzar		Nevada	Republican	Jun 15, 1880	24 years, 147 days	Nov 9, 1904 – Nov 7, 1906	Later state senator (1908–1916), state senate president pro tempore (1915), chairman of the state Republican Party (1924–1925) and governor (1927–1934).
J. C. W. Beckham		Kentucky	Democratic	Aug 5, 1869	24 years, 149 days	Jan 1, 1894 – Jan 1, 1898	Grandson of Charles A. Wickliffe and nephew of Robert C. Wickliffe. Became the youngest-ever Kentucky state legislator. Later lieutenant governor (1900), governor (1900–1907) and U.S. senator (1915–1921).
Alonzo Sledge		Texas	Republican	Aug 15, 1854	24 years, 152 days	Jan 14, 1879 – Jan 11, 1881	
John L. Helm		Kentucky	Whig	Jul 4, 1802	24 years, 153 days	Dec 4, 1826 – Dec 31, 1844	Later state senator (1844–1848), lieutenant governor (1848–1850) and governor (1850–1851, 1867).
Khaleel Anderson		New York	Democratic	Jun 11, 1996	24 years, 154 days	Nov 12, 2020 – present	
Mazzie Christensen		Missouri	Republican	Aug 3, 1998	24 years, 154 days	Jan 4, 2023 – present	
Frank Foster		Michigan	Republican	Jul 31, 1986	24 years, 154 days	Jan 1, 2011 – Jan 1, 2015	
Temple Lea Houston		Texas	Democratic	Aug 12, 1860	24 years, 154 days	Jan 13, 1885 – 1889	Youngest-ever Texas state senator. Son of Sam Houston.
Jim Slattery		Kansas	Democratic	Aug 4, 1948	24 years, 157 days	Jan 8, 1973 – Jan 8, 1979	Later U.S. representative (1983–1995).
Romaine Quinn		Wisconsin	Republican	Jul 30, 1990	24 years, 157 days	Jan 3, 2015 – Jan 4, 2021	Priorly mayor of Rice Lake (2010–2012). Later state senator (2023–present).
Robert F. Murray		Washington	Democratic	Aug 8, 1910	24 years, 159 days	Jan 14, 1935 – Jan 11, 1937	
David Nelson		Alaska	Republican	Aug 13, 1996	24 years, 159 days	Jan 19, 2021 – present	
Daniel Elliott Huger		South Carolina	[?]	Jun 28, 1779	24 years, 160 days	Dec 5, 1803 – Nov 27, 1820, Nov 22, 1830 – Nov 26, 1832	Son of Daniel Huger and son-in-law of Arthur Middleton. Later state senator (1838–1842) and U.S. senator (1843–1845). Switched to the Democratic Party.
Jervis D. Brown Jr.		Connecticut	Republican	Jul 29, 1890	24 years, 161 days	Jan 6, 1915 – Jan 8, 1919	
Thurman P. Maine		Connecticut	Democratic	Jul 30, 1888	24 years, 162 days	Jan 8, 1913 – Jan 6, 1915	
Timothy Sullivan		New York	Democratic	Jul 23, 1862	24 years, 162 days	Jan 1, 1887 – Dec 31, 1893	Later state senator (1894–1902, 1909–1912) and U.S. representative (1903–1906, 1913).
Maurice R. Flynn		Massachusetts	Democratic	Jul 28, 1889	24 years, 163 days	Jan 7, 1914 – Jan 5, 1916	
Kathleen A. Blatz		Minnesota	Republican	Jul 22, 1954	24 years, 165 days	Jan 3, 1979 – Jan 24, 1994	Youngest-ever female Minnesota state legislator. Daughter of state senator Jerome Blatz.
Denny Heck		Washington	Democratic	Jul 29, 1952	24 years, 165 days	Jan 10, 1977 – Jan 14, 1985	Later U.S. representative (2013–2021) and lieutenant governor (2021–present).
Thomas J. Henley		Indiana	Democratic	Jun 18, 1808	24 years, 170 days	Dec 5, 1832 – Dec 4, 1843	Later speaker of the state House (1842–1843), U.S. representative (1843–1849) and California state representative (1851–1853).
Morgan G. Sanders		Texas	Democratic	Jul 14, 1878	24 years, 183 days	Jan 13, 1903 – Jan 8, 1907	Later U.S. representative (1921–1939).
Corey Parent		Vermont	Republican	Jul 8, 1990	24 years, 183 days	Jan 7, 2015 – Jan 9, 2019	Later state senator (2019–2023).
Woodville Jefferson Rogers		Texas	Democratic	Jul 13, 1890	24 years, 183 days	Jan 12, 1915 – Oct 31, 1917	Later state senator (1921–1925) and state senate president pro tempore (1923).
Rebecca White		Vermont	Democratic	Jul 9, 1994	24 years, 184 days	Jan 9, 2019 – Jan 4, 2023	Later state senator (2023–present)
Frank B. Brandegee		Connecticut	Republican	Jul 8, 1864	24 years, 185 days	Jan 9, 1889 – Jan 7, 1891, Jan 4, 1899 – Jan 9, 1901	
Ryan W. Pearson		Rhode Island	Democratic	Jun 30, 1988	24 years, 185 days	Jan 1, 2013 – present	Later majority leader (2023–present).
Ingolf E. Rasmus		Wisconsin	Republican	Jul 4, 1906	24 years, 185 days	Jan 5, 1931 – Jan 3, 1933	
Adam Scanlon		Massachusetts	Democratic	Jul 5, 1996	24 years, 185 days	Jan 6, 2021 – present	
Edwin W. Higgins		Connecticut	Republican	Jul 2, 1874	24 years, 186 days	Jan 4, 1899 – Jan 9, 1901	Later U.S. representative (1905–1913).
Beau LaFave		Michigan	Republican	Jun 27, 1992	24 years, 188 days	Jan 1, 2017 – Jan 1, 2023	Later candidate for state secretary of state (2022).
E. Ray Kirkpatrick		Texas	Democratic	Jul 9, 1922	24 years, 189 days	Jan 14, 1947 – Jan 13, 1953	
William Knowland		California	Republican	Jun 26, 1908	24 years, 190 days	Jan 2, 1933 – Jan 7, 1935	Son of Joseph R. Knowland. Later state senator (1935–1939), U.S. senator (1945–1959) and nominee for governor (1958).
Arthur L. Peterson		Wisconsin	Republican	Jun 27, 1926	24 years, 190 days	Jan 3, 1951 – Jan 3, 1955	Later Montana state representative (2001–2003).
Charles S. Sullivan		Massachusetts	Democratic	Jun 26, 1875	24 years, 191 days	Jan 3, 1900 – Jan 1, 1902	Later state senator (1902–1903, 1904–1905).
Zebulon Baird Vance		North Carolina	Whig	May 13, 1830	24 years, 191 days	Nov 20, 1854 – Nov 17, 1856	Later U.S. representative (1858–1861), governor (1862–1865, 1877–1879) and U.S. senator (1879–1894).
Lewis Miles		Iowa	Republican	Jun 30, 1845	24 years, 194 days	Jan 10, 1870 – Jan 7, 1872	Later state senator (1884–1888).
Silas D. Reed		Massachusetts	Republican	Jun 25, 1872	24 years, 195 days	Jan 6, 1897 – Jan 7, 1903	Later state senator (1905–1907, 1918–1923).
William E. Weeks		Massachusetts	Republican	Jun 23, 1880	24 years, 195 days	Jan 4, 1905 – Jan 5, 1910, Jan 5, 1916 – Jan 3, 1917	Later mayor of Everett (1918–1919).
Frank A. Manning		Massachusetts	Democratic	Jun 25, 1889	24 years, 196 days	Jan 7, 1914 – Jan 5, 1921	
Dennis M. O'Brien		Pennsylvania	Republican	Jun 22, 1952	24 years, 196 days	Jan 4, 1977 – Nov 30, 1980, Jan 5, 1983 – Jan 2, 2012	Later speaker of the state House (2007–2008).
Leah Cole Allen		Massachusetts	Republican	Oct 15, 1988	24 years, 198 days	May 1, 2013 – Sep 28, 2015	Later nominee for lieutenant governor (2022).
Thomas E. Flaherty		Pennsylvania	Democratic	Jun 18, 1950	24 years, 199 days	Jan 3, 1975 – Jan 2, 1979	Later member of the Pittsburgh City Council (1980–1984), city controller (1984–2006) and chair of the Allegheny County Democratic Party (2002–2005).
Dirk Deaton		Missouri	Republican	Jun 14, 1994	24 years, 205 days	Jan 5, 2019 – present	Second youngest ever Missouri state representative.
John Vinich		Wyoming	Democratic	Jun 13, 1950	24 years, 207 days	Jan 6, 1975 – Jan 3, 1983	Later state senator (1983–1999) and nominee for U.S. senator (1988) and for governor (1998).
Charles A. Wickliffe		Kentucky	Democratic-Republican	Jun 8, 1788	24 years, 207 days	Jan 1, 1813 – Jan 1, 1815	Later U.S. representative (1823–1833, 1861–1863), lieutenant governor (1836–1839), acting governor (1839–1840) and U.S. postmaster general (1841–1845).
William Laird McCormick		Wisconsin	Republican	Jun 12, 1876	24 years, 209 days	Jan 7, 1901 – Jan 5, 1903	
Mack McLarty		Arkansas	Democratic	Jun 14, 1946	24 years, 210 days	Jan 10, 1971 – Jan 8, 1973	Later chair of the state Democratic Party (1974–1976), White House chief of staff (1993–1994) and counselor to the president (1994–1998).
Robert Xavier Tivnan		Massachusetts	Democratic	Jun 9, 1924	24 years, 210 days	Jan 5, 1949 – Jan 7, 1959	
George J. Wall		Massachusetts	Democratic	Jun 11, 1889	24 years, 210 days	Jan 7, 1914 – Jan 3, 1917	
William Cabell Rives		Virginia	[?]	May 4, 1793	24 years, 211 days	Dec 1, 1817 – Dec 4, 1820, Dec 2, 1822 – Dec 1, 1823	Later U.S. representative (1823–1829), U.S. senator (1832–1834, 1836–1839, 1841–1845) and Confederate States representative (1864–1865).
Lorne R. Worthington		Iowa	Democratic	Jun 14, 1938	24 years, 214 days	Jan 14, 1963 – Jan 10, 1965	Later state auditor (1965–1967) and insurance commissioner (1967–1971).
Richard Varn		Iowa	Democratic	May 31, 1958	24 years, 215 days	Jan 1, 1983 – Feb 2, 1994	
Alvin M. Owsley		Texas	Democratic	Jun 11, 1888	24 years, 217 days	Jan 14, 1913 – Jan 12, 1915	Son of Alvin Clark Owsley. Later candidate for U.S. senator (1928).
James L. Callan		Wisconsin	Democratic	Jun 3, 1910	24 years, 220 days	Jan 9, 1935 – Jan 4, 1939	
Andy Welti		Minnesota	Democratic	May 28, 1980	24 years, 221 days	Jan 4, 2005 – Jan 3, 2011	
Edmund L. Pitts		New York	Republican	May 23, 1839	24 years, 223 days	Jan 1, 1864 – Dec 31, 1868	Later speaker of the state House (1867), state senator (1880–1883, 1886–1887) and state senate president pro tempore (1886–1887).
Aaron M. I. Shinberg		Massachusetts	Democratic	May 27, 1940	24 years, 224 days	Jan 6, 1965 – Jan 1, 1969	
Peter V. Daniel		Virginia	[?]	Apr 24, 1784	24 years, 225 days	Dec 5, 1808 – Dec 3, 1810	Later associate justice of the Supreme Court (1842–1860).
Owen A. Gallagher		Massachusetts	Democratic	May 24, 1902	24 years, 226 days	Jan 5, 1927 – Jan 4, 1933	Son of Daniel J. Gallagher. Later state senator (1933–1935).
John Y. Mason		Kentucky	[?]	Apr 18, 1799	24 years, 227 days	Dec 1, 1823 – 1827	Later state senator (1827–1831), U.S. representative (1831–1837), secretary of the navy (1844–1845, 1846–1849) and attorney general (1845–1846).
John R. McKernan Jr.		Maine	Republican	May 20, 1948	24 years, 228 days	Jan 3, 1973 – Jan 5, 1977	Later U.S. representative (1983–1987) and governor (1987–1995).
Loring M. Black Jr.		New York	Democratic	May 17, 1886	24 years, 229 days	Jan 1, 1911 – Dec 31, 1912, Jan 1, 1919 – Dec 31, 1920	Later U.S. representative (1923–1935).
Charles O. Engstrom		Massachusetts	Republican	May 19, 1875	24 years, 229 days	Jan 3, 1900 – Jan 2, 1901	
Cathy McMorris Rodgers		Washington	Republican	May 22, 1969	24 years, 230 days	Jan 7, 1994 – Jan 3, 2005	Later U.S. representative (2005–present).
Anthony Michael Gallugi		Massachusetts	Democratic	May 16, 1948	24 years, 232 days	Jan 3, 1973 – Jan 3, 1979	
Jeremiah Haralson		Alabama	Republican	Apr 1, 1846	24 years, 234 days	Nov 21, 1870 – Nov 18, 1872	Later state senator (1872–1875) and U.S. representative (1875–1877).
Frank T. Caprio		Rhode Island	Democratic	May 10, 1966	24 years, 236 days	Jan 1, 1991 – Jan 3, 1995	Son of Frank Caprio. Later state senator (1995–2007), state treasurer (2007–2011) and nominee for governor (2010).
Leo Giacometto		Montana	Republican	May 14, 1962	24 years, 236 days	Jan 5, 1987 – 1990	Later director of the state department of agriculture (1993–1995).
Joseph Martin		Wisconsin	Democratic	May 12, 1878	24 years, 238 days	Jan 5, 1903 – Jan 3, 1905	
Bartholomew A. Brickley		Massachusetts	Democratic	May 7, 1883	24 years, 239 days	Jan 1, 1908 – Jan 5, 1910	
Charles P. Lyman		Connecticut	Democratic	May 9, 1858	24 years, 239 days	Jan 3, 1883 – Jan 7, 1885	
Murray Watson Jr.		Texas	Democratic	May 14, 1932	24 years, 239 days	Jan 8, 1957 – Jan 8, 1963	Later state senator (1963–1973).
Marion Biggs Jr.		California	Democratic	Apr 8, 1851	24 years, 242 days	Dec 6, 1875 – Dec 3, 1877	Son of congressman Marion Biggs.
Edward A. Edmonds		Wisconsin	Democratic	May 2, 1868	24 years, 246 days	Jan 3, 1893 – Jan 7, 1895	
H. Joel Deckard		Indiana	Republican	Mar 7, 1942	24 years, 247 days	Nov 9, 1966 – Nov 6, 1974	Later U.S. representative (1979–1983) and Reform Party nominee for U.S. senator from Florida (2000).
Stephen Van Rensselaer		New York	Federalist	Nov 1, 1764	24 years, 247 days	Jul 6, 1789 – Jan 5, 1791	Later state senator (1791–1796), lieutenant governor (1795–1801), nominee for governor (1801, 1813) and U.S. representative (1822–1829).
Norman Knudson		Wisconsin	Republican	Apr 30, 1874	24 years, 248 days	Jan 3, 1899 – Jan 5, 1903	
Henry H. Lyman		Connecticut	Republican	May 4, 1888	24 years, 249 days	Jan 8, 1913 – Jan 6, 1915	Later state senator (1915–1919).
Grant Hodges		Arkansas	Republican	May 7, 1990	24 years, 250 days	Jan 12, 2015 – Jul 10, 2020, Jan 9, 2023 – present	
Paul F. Malloy		Massachusetts	Democratic	Apr 29, 1940	24 years, 252 days	Jan 6, 1965 – Jan 3, 1973	
Joseph Story		Massachusetts	Democratic-Republican	Sep 18, 1779	25 years, 253 days	May 29, 1805 – May 26, 1807	Later U.S. representative (1808–1809) and Supreme Court justice (1812–1845).
H. Edward Snow		Massachusetts	Republican	Apr 25, 1914	24 years, 254 days	Jan 4, 1939 – Jan 2, 1945, Jan 1, 1947 – Jan 4, 1955	
Charles S. Tuttle		Connecticut	Republican	Apr 28, 1860	24 years, 254 days	Jan 7, 1885 – Jan 5, 1887	
Chuck Espy		Mississippi	Democratic	Apr 24, 1975	24 years, 255 days	Jan 4, 2000 – Jan 5, 2016	Son of Henry Espy and nephew of Mike Espy. Later mayor of Clarksdale (2017–present).
John N. Wozniak		Pennsylvania	Democratic	Mar 21, 1956	24 years, 255 days	Dec 1, 1980 – Dec 1, 1996	Later state senator (1996–2016).
James Langevin		Rhode Island	Democratic	Apr 22, 1964	24 years, 256 days	Jan 3, 1989 – Jan 3, 1995	Later state secretary of state (1995–2001) and U.S. representative (2001–2023).
Hamilton Fish II		New York	Republican	Apr 17, 1849	24 years, 259 days	Jan 1, 1874 – Dec 31, 1874, Jan 1, 1876 – Dec 31, 1879, Jan 1, 1889 – Dec 31, 1896	Son of Hamilton Fish. Later speaker of the state House (1895–1896) and U.S. representative (1909–1911).
Marty Seifert		Minnesota	Republican	Apr 23, 1972	24 years, 259 days	Jan 7, 1997 – Jan 3, 2011	
Park Cannon		Georgia	Democratic	Jun 6, 1991	24 years, 261 days	Feb 22, 2016 – present	
John Pierce Lynch		Massachusetts	Democratic	Apr 19, 1924	24 years, 261 days	Jan 5, 1949 – Jan 7, 1953	
Michael Cormack		Iowa	Republican	Apr 22, 1970	24 years, 262 days	Jan 9, 1995 – Jan 12, 2003	
Romulus Mitchell Saunders		North Carolina	Democratic-Republican	Mar 3, 1791	24 years, 262 days	Nov 20, 1815 – Dec 21, 1815, Nov 17, 1817 – Dec 25, 1820, Nov 20, 1848 – Dec 27, 1852	Later state senator (1816), speaker of the state House (1819–1820), U.S. representative (1821–1827, 1841–1845), and state attorney general (1828–1834).
Romulus Mitchell Saunders		North Carolina	Democratic	Mar 3, 1791	24 years, 262 days	Nov 20, 1815 – Dec 21, 1815, Nov 17, 1817 – Dec 25, 1820, Nov 20, 1848 – Dec 27, 1852	Later state senator (1816), speaker of the state House (1819–1820), U.S. representative (1821–1827, 1841–1845), and state attorney general (1828–1834).
Marcus Gaspard		Washington	Democratic	Apr 19, 1948	24 years, 264 days	Jan 8, 1973 – Jan 10, 1977	Later state senator (1977–1995).
Tyson Larson		Nebraska	Republican	Apr 16, 1986	24 years, 264 days	Jan 5, 2011 – Jan 9, 2019	
David Lucas		Georgia	Democratic	Apr 23, 1950	24 years, 265 days	Jan 13, 1975 – Jul 1, 2011	Later state senator (2013–present).
Samuel J. Crawford		Kansas	Republican	Apr 10, 1835	24 years, 267 days	Jan 2, 1860 – 1861	Later governor (1865–1868).
Thomas W. Nevin		Colorado	Democratic	Feb 11, 1910	24 years, 269 days	Nov 7, 1934 – Nov 9, 1936	Since Nevin was only 24 years old, his swearing-in was in violation of the state constitution's age requirement of 25 years.
Alexander H. Stephens		Georgia	Whig	Feb 11, 1812	24 years, 270 days	Nov 7, 1836 – Dec 9, 1841	Later state senator (1842), U.S. representative (1843–1859, 1873–1882), member of the Provisional Congress of the Confederate States (1861–1862), vice president of the Confederate States (1862–1865) and governor of Georgia (1882–1883).
Ernest Keppler		Wisconsin	Republican	Apr 5, 1918	24 years, 274 days	Jan 4, 1943 – Jan 3, 1945	
Kenneth J. DeBeaussaert		Michigan	Democratic	Apr 10, 1954	24 years, 275 days	Jan 10, 1979 – Jan 1981, Jan 12, 1983 – Jan 1985, Jan 14, 1987 – Jan 1993	Later state senator (1995–2003).
Chuck Larson		Iowa	Republican	Apr 1, 1968	24 years, 275 days	Jan 1, 1993 – Jan 1, 2003	Later state senator (2003–2007).
A. P. Barrett		Texas	Democratic	Apr 12, 1878	24 years, 276 days	Jan 13, 1903 – Jan 10, 1905	Later state senator (1905–1909) and state senate president pro tempore (1907).
John E. Clark		Maryland	Democratic	Apr 1, 1910	24 years, 276 days	Jan 2, 1935 – 1947	
Carl M. Iverson		Minnesota	Independent	Apr 6, 1894	24 years, 276 days	Jan 7, 1919 – Jan 5, 1931; Jan 3, 1939 – Jan 2, 1967	Later state senator (1931–1935).
Emily Cain		Maine	Democratic	Mar 29, 1980	24 years, 278 days	Jan 1, 2005 – Dec 5, 2012	Later minority leader (2010–2012), state senator (2012–2014) and executive director of EMILY's List (2017–present).
David Patterson Dyer		Missouri	Republican	Feb 12, 1838	24 years, 278 days	Nov 17, 1862 – Nov 19, 1866	Later U.S. representative (1869–1871) and nominee for governor (1880).
Don Wesely		Nebraska	Democratic	Mar 30, 1954	24 years, 279 days	Jan 3, 1979 – Jan 1999	At the time the third youngest ever Nebraska state legislator, and at his retirement the eighth-longest serving legislator in state history. Later mayor of Lincoln (1999–2003).
Oscar J. Schmiege		Wisconsin	Republican	Mar 29, 1902	24 years, 280 days	Jan 3, 1927 – Jan 3, 1933	
Phil Foster		Georgia	Democratic	Apr 4, 1958	24 years, 281 days	Jan 10, 1983 – Jan 14, 1991	Son of R. L. Foster.
Joe Schomacker		Minnesota	Republican	Mar 25, 1986	24 years, 284 days	Jan 3, 2011 – present	
Spencer Igo		Minnesota	Republican	Mar 26, 1996	24 years, 285 days	Jan 5, 2021 – present	
Stephen W. Doran		Massachusetts	Democratic	Mar 26, 1956	24 years, 287 days	Jan 7, 1981 – Jan 4, 1995	
Marcus Harvey Townsend		Texas	Democratic	Mar 26, 1858	24 years, 289 days	Jan 9, 1883 – Jan 13, 1885, Jan 8, 1889 – Jan 10, 1893	
Henry Chamberlain		Michigan	Democratic	Mar 17, 1824	24 years, 290 days	Jan 1, 1849 – Apr 2, 1849	Later nominee for governor (1874).
Daniel T. McCarty		Florida	Democratic	Jan 18, 1912	24 years, 290 days	Nov 3, 1936 – Nov 3, 1942	Later speaker of the state House (1941–1943) and governor (1953).
Joe Crowley		New York	Democratic	March 16, 1962	24 years, 291 days	Jan 1, 1987 – Dec 31, 1998	Later U.S. representative (1999–2019).
James W. Husted		New York	Republican	Mar 16, 1870	24 years, 291 days	Jan 1, 1895 – Dec 31, 1897	Son of James W. Husted. Later U.S. representative (1915–1923).
Luke F. Cozans		New York	Democratic	Mar 15, 1836	24 years, 292 days	Jan 1, 1861 – Dec 31, 1861, Jan 1, 1877 – Dec 31, 1877	Later state senator (1864–1865).
Dan Gwadosky		Maine	Democratic	Feb 16, 1954	24 years, 293 days	Dec 6, 1978 – 1996	Later state secretary of state (1997–2005).
Arne H. Wicklund		Wisconsin	Democratic	Mar 13, 1926	24 years, 296 days	Jan 3, 1951 – Jan 5, 1955	
John L. Buckley		New York	Democratic	Mar 9, 1900	24 years, 298 days	Jan 1, 1925 – Dec 31, 1926	Later state senator (1927–1942).
Milton A. Candler		Georgia	Democratic	Jan 11, 1837	24 years, 299 days	Nov 6, 1861 – Nov 4, 1863	Son of Samuel Charles Candler. Later state senator (1868–1872) and U.S. representative (1875–1879).
William G. Giaccio		New York	Democratic	Mar 8, 1924	24 years, 299 days	Jan 1, 1949 – Dec 31, 1962	
Thomas V. Murray		New Hampshire	Democratic	Mar 8, 1876	24 years, 300 days	Jan 2, 1901 – [?]	
James G. Birney		Kentucky	Democratic-Republican	Feb 4, 1792	24 years, 302 days	Dec 2, 1816 – Feb 5, 1817	Later Alabama state representative (1819–1820) and Liberty Party nominee for vice president of the United States (1840, 1844).
Daniel Fischer		Wisconsin	Democratic	Mar 4, 1952	24 years, 305 days	Jan 3, 1977 – Jan 3, 1979	
Ryan Kiesel		Oklahoma	Democratic	Jan 15, 1980	24 years, 307 days	Nov 17, 2004 – Nov 17, 2010	
Dave L. Reed		Pennsylvania	Republican	Mar 6, 1978	24 years, 307 days	Jan 7, 2003 – Nov 30, 2018	Later majority leader (2015–2018).
Lee Cate		Oklahoma	Democratic	Jan 18, 1942	24 years, 309 days	Nov 23, 1966 – Oct 17, 1973	Later state senator (1973–1986).
William L. V. Newton		Massachusetts	Democratic	Feb 28, 1881	24 years, 309 days	Jan 3, 1906 – Jan 1, 1908, Jan 4, 1911 – Jan 3, 1912	
Malcolm Wilson		New York	Republican	Feb 26, 1914	24 years, 309 days	Jan 1, 1939 – Dec 31, 1958	Later lieutenant governor (1959–1973) and governor (1973–1974).
Theodore A. Glynn Jr.		Massachusetts	Democratic	Feb 26, 1916	24 years, 310 days	Jan 1, 1941 – Jan 6, 1943	Son of Theodore A. Glynn.
George M. O'Connor		Wisconsin	Republican	Feb 27, 1902	24 years, 310 days	Jan 3, 1927 – Jan 4, 1933	
James A. Barcia		Michigan	Democratic	Feb 25, 1952	24 years, 311 days	Jan 1, 1977 – Dec 31, 1982	Later state senator (1983–1992, 2003–2010), U.S. representative (1993–2003) and Bay County Executive (2017–present).
Howard Doherty		Washington	Democratic	Mar 6, 1912	24 years, 311 days	Jan 11, 1937 – Jan 9, 1939, Jan 13, 1941 – Jan 11, 1943	
Frank L. Rodgers		Connecticut	Republican	Feb 26, 1858	24 years, 311 days	Jan 3, 1883 – Jan 9, 1884	
Alexander Contee Hanson		Maryland	Federalist	Feb 27, 1786	24 years, 316 days	Jan 9, 1811 – 1815	Son of Alexander Contee Hanson Sr. and grandson of John Hanson. Later U.S. representative (1813–1816) and U.S. senator (1816–1819).
Webster Ballinger		Iowa	Democratic	Feb 25, 1841	24 years, 317 days	Jan 8, 1866 – Jan 12, 1868, Jan 8, 1872 – Jan 11, 1874	
Dennis Bonnen		Texas	Republican	Mar 3, 1972	24 years, 317 days	Jan 14, 1997 – Jan 12, 2021	Later speaker pro tempore (2013–2019) and speaker of the state House (2019–2021).
Joseph J. Kelley		Massachusetts	Democratic	Feb 22, 1868	24 years, 317 days	Jan 4, 1893 – Jan 2, 1895	
Frank Owen III		Texas	Democratic	Feb 25, 1926	24 years, 318 days	Jan 9, 1951 – Nov 5, 1954	Later state senator (1954–1965) and state senate president pro tempore (1959–1961).
William F. Winter		Mississippi	Democratic	Feb 21, 1923	24 years, 319 days	Jan 6, 1948 – Jan 3, 1956	Later lieutenant governor (1972–1976), governor (1980–1984) and nominee for U.S. senator (1984).
Joseph Wenceslaus Bartunek		Ohio	Democratic	Feb 16, 1924	24 years, 320 days	Jan 1, 1949 – 1958; 1959–1964	Later minority leader (1951–1958).
Elmer Baumann		Wisconsin	Socialist	Feb 15, 1902	24 years, 322 days	Jan 3, 1927 – Jan 7, 1929	
Tim Hickey		Massachusetts	Democratic	Feb 14, 1938	24 years, 322 days	Jan 2, 1963 – Jan 3, 1973	
Alex Garza		Michigan	Democratic	Feb 13, 1994	24 years, 322 days	Jan 1, 2019 – Jan 1, 2023	Priorly mayor pro tempore of Taylor (2017–2019).
John I. Kleiber		Texas	Democratic	Feb 25, 1866	24 years, 322 days	Jan 13, 1891 – Jan 10, 1893	
Al Sturgeon		Iowa	Democratic	Feb 14, 1956	24 years, 322 days	Jan 1, 1981 – Jan 1, 1987	
Samantha Vang		Minnesota	Democratic	Feb 20, 1994	24 years, 322 days	Jan 8, 2019 – present	
George S. Weed		New York	Democratic	Feb 13, 1862	24 years, 322 days	Jan 1, 1887 – Dec 31, 1888	
Timothy Wesco		Indiana	Republican	Dec 16, 1985	24 years, 322 days	Nov 3, 2010 – present	
Paul Alfonsi		Wisconsin	Republican	Feb 13, 1908	24 years, 325 days	Jan 3, 1933 – Jan 3, 1939, Jan 5, 1959 – Jan 4, 1971	Later speaker of the state House (1937–1939) and candidate for governor (1940). Switched to the Wisconsin Progressive Party in 1934, and back to the Republican Party in 1942.
Paul Alfonsi		Wisconsin	Progressive	Feb 13, 1908	24 years, 325 days	Jan 3, 1933 – Jan 3, 1939, Jan 5, 1959 – Jan 4, 1971	Later speaker of the state House (1937–1939) and candidate for governor (1940). Switched to the Wisconsin Progressive Party in 1934, and back to the Republican Party in 1942.
Paul Alfonsi		Wisconsin	Republican	Feb 13, 1908	24 years, 325 days	Jan 3, 1933 – Jan 3, 1939, Jan 5, 1959 – Jan 4, 1971	Later speaker of the state House (1937–1939) and candidate for governor (1940). Switched to the Wisconsin Progressive Party in 1934, and back to the Republican Party in 1942.
Richard P. Roche		Massachusetts	Democratic	Feb 15, 1952	24 years, 325 days	Jan 5, 1977 – Jan 7, 1981	
Eugene F. Bert		California	Republican	Feb 13, 1866	24 years, 326 days	Jan 5, 1891 – Jan 2, 1893	
Joseph C. Czerwinski		Wisconsin	Democratic	Feb 15, 1944	24 years, 326 days	Jan 6, 1969 – Jan 5, 1981	
Daniel J. O'Connell		Massachusetts	Democratic	Feb 13, 1908	24 years, 326 days	Jan 4, 1933 – Jan 2, 1935	
Jake LaTurner		Kansas	Republican	Feb 17, 1988	24 years, 327 days	Jan 9, 2013 – Apr 25, 2017	Later state treasurer (2017–2021) and U.S. representative (2021–2025).
John F. Buckley		Wisconsin	Republican	Feb 10, 1892	24 years, 328 days	Jan 3, 1917 – Jan 3, 1921	
George Hasay		Pennsylvania	Republican	Feb 7, 1948	24 years, 329 days	Jan 1, 1973 – Nov 30, 2006	
Hugh C. Todd		Washington	Democratic	Feb 16, 1884	24 years, 330 days	Jan 11, 1909 – Jan 13, 1913	
Edwin A. Buck		Connecticut	Republican	Feb 11, 1832	24 years, 331 days	Jan 7, 1857 – Jan 6, 1858	
William Nathaniel Rogers		New Hampshire	Democratic	Jan 10, 1892	24 years, 331 days	Dec 6, 1916 – Dec 1, 1920	Later U.S. representative (1923–1925, 1932–1937) and nominee for U.S. senator (1936).
Matthew Ruby		North Dakota	Republican	Jan 3, 1992	24 years, 333 days	Dec 1, 2016 – present	Son of Dan Ruby.
Branden Petersen		Minnesota	Republican	Feb 4, 1986	24 years, 334 days	Jan 4, 2011 – Jan 7, 2013	Later state senator (2013–2015).
Percy L. Henderson		California	Democratic	Feb 5, 1870	24 years, 336 days	Jan 7, 1895 – Jan 2, 1899	
Donald P. Ryan		Wisconsin	Democratic	Feb 5, 1910	24 years, 336 days	Jan 7, 1935 – Jan 3, 1939	
George S. Burgess		Massachusetts	Republican	Jan 30, 1876	24 years, 337 days	Jan 2, 1901 – Jan 1, 1902	
Wilbur S. Miller		Connecticut	Republican	Feb 1, 1874	24 years, 337 days	Jan 4, 1899 – Jan 9, 1901, Jan 4, 1911 – Jan 8, 1913	
Calvin Say		Hawaii	Democratic	Feb 1, 1952	24 years, 337 days	Jan 3, 1977 – Nov 3, 2020	Later speaker of the state House (1999–2013).
Stoddard B. Colby		Vermont	Democratic	Feb 3, 1816	24 years, 338 days	Jan 6, 1841 – Jan 4, 1843	Later nominee for lieutenant governor (1855) and register of the Treasury (1864–1867).
Darrin Camilleri		Michigan	Democratic	Jan 28, 1992	24 years, 339 days	Jan 1, 2017 – Jan 1, 2023	Later state senator (2023–present).
Donald Betts		Kansas	Democratic	Feb 8, 1978	24 years, 339 days	Jan 13, 2003 – Jan 13, 2004	Later state senator (2004–2009).
Nelson Dewey		Wisconsin	Democratic	Dec 19, 1813	24 years, 342 days	Nov 26, 1838 – Dec 5, 1842	Later speaker of the House (1840), member of the territorial council (1842–1847), president of the council (1846–1847), governor (1848–1852) and state senator (1854–1856).
James E. Hagan		Massachusetts	Democratic	Jan 25, 1902	24 years, 345 days	Jan 5, 1927 – 1932	Later mayor of Somerville (1934–1936).
Aaron Regunberg		Rhode Island	Democratic	Jan 26, 1990	24 years, 345 days	Jan 6, 2015 – Jan 1, 2019	Nephew of Brad Schneider. Later candidate for lieutenant governor (2018).
Stan Jones		Indiana	Democratic	Nov 22, 1949	24 years, 349 days	Nov 6, 1974 – Nov 7, 1990	
David C. Sanford		Connecticut	Republican	Jan 23, 1876	24 years, 351 days	Jan 9, 1901 – Jan 7, 1903	
Bob McEwen		Ohio	Republican	Jan 12, 1950	24 years, 354 days	Jan 1, 1975 – Dec 31, 1980	Later U.S. representative (1981–1993).
A. A. Ames		Minnesota	Democratic	Jan 18, 1842	24 years, 355 days	Jan 8, 1867 – Jan 6, 1868	Son of Alfred Elisha Ames. Later mayor of Minneapolis (1876–1877, 1882–1884, 1886–1889, 1901–1902) and nominee for governor (1886).
Thomas E. Bramlette		Kentucky	Whig	Jan 3, 1817	24 years, 362 days	Dec 31, 1841 – Mar 3, 1842	Son of state senator Ambrose S. Bramlette. Later governor (1863–1867).
Randolph H. Chandler		Connecticut	Republican	Jan 11, 1854	24 years, 362 days	Jan 8, 1879 – Jan 5, 1881; Jan 9, 1901 – Jan 7, 1903	
Fernand St Germain		Rhode Island	Democratic	Jan 9, 1928	24 years, 363 days	Jan 6, 1953 – Jan 3, 1961	Later U.S. representative (1961–1989).
Robert T. Abernathy		Missouri	Democratic	1884	24 years	Jan 6, 1909 – [?]	
Michael A. Batza		Connecticut	Democratic	1912	24 years	Jan 6, 1937 – Jan 4, 1939	
Richard W. Bowden		Washington	Democratic	1910	24 years	Jan 14, 1935 – Jan 11, 1937	
George Bradley		Minnesota	[?]	1833	24 years	Dec 2, 1857 – Dec 6, 1859	Later speaker of the state House (1858–1859).
Elmer L. Brown		Kentucky	Democratic	1889	24 years	Jan 1, 1914 – Jan 1, 1916	
Christopher Davis		Connecticut	Republican	1986	24 years	Jan 5, 2011 – Jan 6, 2021	
Dan Gaiewski		Connecticut	Democratic	2000	24 years	Feb 28, 2025 – Present	
Charles E. Gaches		Washington	Republican	1882	24 years	Jan 14, 1907 – Jan 11, 1909	
John A. Giordano		Connecticut	Democratic	1950	24 years	Jan 8, 1975 – Jan 5, 1977	
J. Martin Hennessey		Connecticut	Democratic	1948	24 years	Jan 3, 1973 – Jan 8, 1975	
George W. Kavanagh		New York	Democratic	1880	24 years	Jan 1, 1905 – Dec 31, 1906	
Leo J. Kelly		Connecticut	Democratic	1888	24 years	Jan 8, 1913 – Jan 6, 1915	
John McMullin		California	Democratic	Mar 1864	24 years	Jan 7, 1889 – Jan 5, 1891	
Ernest T. Olson		Washington	Democratic	1914	24 years	Jan 9, 1939 – Jan 13, 1941	
Louis B. Rosenfeld		Connecticut	Republican	1896	24 years	Jan 5, 1921 – Jan 3, 1923	
Samuel Rucker		California	Democratic	1862	24 years	Jan 3, 1887 – Jan 7, 1889	
Joseph W. Schwartz		Connecticut	Democratic	Dec 1950	24 years	Jan 8, 1975 – Jan 5, 1977	
Francis S. Skiff		Connecticut	Democratic	1866	24 years	Jan 7, 1891 – Jan 4, 1893, Jan 6, 1915 – Jan 3, 1917	
Robert J. Stack		Connecticut	Republican	1898	24 years	Jan 8, 1923 – Jan 7, 1925	
Nicholas Tomassetti		Connecticut	Democratic	1914	24 years	Jan 4, 1939 – Jan 8, 1947	
Gino White		Idaho	Democratic	1962–1963	24 years	1987 – Dec 1, 1994	
Jim Yost		Idaho	Republican	1948	24 years	Dec 1, 1972 – Dec 1, 1976	
Robert P. Letcher		Kentucky	Democratic-Republican	Feb 10, 1788	24–25 years	1813–1815, 1817–1821	Later U.S. representative (1823–1833, 1834–1835) and governor (1840–1844).
George Mason III		Virginia	Independent	1690	24–25 years	1715 – 1726	Son of George Mason II.
Clarence W. Upton		California	Democratic	1854	24 years	Dec 3, 1877 – Feb 5, 1878	Died in office.
James Moore Wayne		Georgia	Independent	1790	24–25 years	1815–1816	Later mayor of Savannah (1817–1819), U.S. representative (1829–1835) and associate justice of the Supreme Court (1835–1867).
Houston Gaines		Georgia	Republican	Jan 11, 1995	24 years, 3 days	Jan 14, 2019 – present	Candidate in the 2026 Republican primary for Georgia's 10th congressional district.

=== Territorial legislators ===
Name	Image	Territory	Political party	Date of birth	Age upon taking office	Tenure	Notes
Luis Ángel Torres Torres		Puerto Rico	Independence	Jul 26, 1948	24 years, 166 days	Jan 8, 1973 – [?]	
Zilpher Jennings		American Samoa	Independent	Jun 13, 1928	24 years, 233 days	Feb 1, 1953 – 1954	One of the first two women elected to the American Samoa House of Representatives.
Benigno Aquino Sr.		Philippines	Nacionalista	Sep 3, 1894	24 years, 273 days	Jun 3, 1919 – Jun 5, 1928	Son of Servillano Aquino. Later territorial senator (1928–1934), member of the National Assembly (1935–1938, 1943–1944) and speaker of the Philippine House (1943–1944).
Mariano Jesús Cuenco		Philippines	Nacionalista	Jan 16, 1888	24 years, 274 days	Oct 16, 1912 – Jul 26, 1928	Later governor of Cebu (1931–1934), secretary of public works and communications (1936–1939), Philippine senator (1946–1951, 1953–1964) and senate president (1949–1951).
Danny López Soto		Puerto Rico	New Progressive	Mar 13, 1944	24 years, 295 days	Jan 2, 1969 – Jan 1, 1977	Later territorial senator (1977–1985). Co-founder of the New Progressive Party (1967).
Melinda Romero Donnelly		Puerto Rico	New Progressive	Oct 8, 1971	25 years, 86 days	Jan 2, 1997 – Jan 1, 2005	Daughter of Carlos Romero Barceló. Later territorial senator (2009–2013) and shadow U.S. senator (2021–present).
Benny Frankie Cerezo		Puerto Rico	New Progressive	Sep 27, 1943	25 years, 97 days	Jan 2, 1969 – Jan 1, 1973	Co-founder of the New Progressive Party (1967).
Jorge de Castro Font		Puerto Rico	Popular Democratic	Sep 10, 1963	25 years, 114 days	Jan 2, 1989 – Jan 1, 2005	Left the Popular Democratic Party in August 2001, and joined the New Progressive Party in September 2002. Later territorial senator (2005–2009) and senate majority leader (2005).
Jorge de Castro Font		Puerto Rico	Independent	Sep 10, 1963	25 years, 114 days	Jan 2, 1989 – Jan 1, 2005	Left the Popular Democratic Party in August 2001, and joined the New Progressive Party in September 2002. Later territorial senator (2005–2009) and senate majority leader (2005).
Jorge de Castro Font		Puerto Rico	New Progressive	Sep 10, 1963	25 years, 114 days	Jan 2, 1989 – Jan 1, 2005	Left the Popular Democratic Party in August 2001, and joined the New Progressive Party in September 2002. Later territorial senator (2005–2009) and senate majority leader (2005).
Miguel Raffiñan		Philippines	Nacionalista	May 13, 1891	25 years, 156 days	Oct 16, 1916 – Oct 27, 1922, Jul 16, 1931 – Jul 16, 1934, Jan 24, 1939 – Dec 16, 1941	Later mayor of Cebu City (1947–1951).
Teodoro Kalaw		Philippines	Nacionalista	Mar 31, 1884	25 years, 199 days	Oct 16, 1909 – Oct 16, 1912	Later territorial secretary of the interior (1920–1922).
Jenniffer González		Puerto Rico	New Progressive	Aug 5, 1976	25 years, 207 days	Feb 28, 2002 – Jan 2, 2017	Later speaker of the House (2009–2013), minority leader (2013–2017), chair of the territorial Republican Party (2015–2021) and resident commissioner (2017–present).
Kurt Moylan		Guam	Independent	Jan 14, 1939	25 years, 356 days	Jan 4, 1965 – Jan 2, 1967	Later co-founder of the territorial Republican Party (1966), secretary of the territory (1969–1971) and lieutenant governor (1971–1975).
Kurt Moylan		Guam	Republican	Jan 14, 1939	25 years, 356 days	Jan 4, 1965 – Jan 2, 1967	Later co-founder of the territorial Republican Party (1966), secretary of the territory (1969–1971) and lieutenant governor (1971–1975).
Samuel Ioka Ale Meleisea		American Samoa	Independent	Mar 1991	25 years	Jan 3, 2017 – present	+
