= Dirty Thirty (Texas politics) =

Texas political group

The Dirty Thirty was a bipartisan coalition of thirty members of the Texas House of Representatives during the 62nd Legislature (1971–1972). The group, led by Representative Frances “Sissy” Farenthold, became known for opposing the leadership of Speaker Gus Mutscher in the aftermath of the Sharpstown stock-fraud scandal. Their efforts helped keep attention on corruption within Texas politics and contributed to a wave of reforms in 1973.

== Background ==
In 1971, a federal investigation revealed a stock-fraud scheme involving Houston banker Frank Sharp, which came to be known as the Sharpstown scandal. The Fort Worth office of the Security and Exchange Commission filed suit in federal court against Sharp, former Texas Attorney General Waggoner Carr, and former State Insurance Commissioner John Osorio in January 1971, prompting a mass withdrawal by depositors of the Sharpstown State Bank, resulting in what was then the largest bank failure in the history of the Federal Deposit Insurance Corporation. Dozens of state officials, including House Speaker Gus Mutscher, were implicated for receiving bank loans in exchange for favorable legislation.

== Inception ==
Knowing the Speaker would never allow himself to be investigated through normal House procedures, Farenthold began gathering a group of anti-corruption-minded colleagues spanning the political spectrum. By February the loose-knit group was meeting almost daily in the office of State Representative Tom Moore, Jr. to strategize on ways to use the House rules to keep the scandal alive in the House. On March 15, 1971, their plan of action unfolded on the House floor. Farenthold rose and, from the front lectern of the House below the Speaker's dais, as a matter of privilege introduced House Concurrent Resolution 87 to form a committee to investigate the SEC's charges against Mutscher. Despite having 22 co-sponsors, Mutscher ruled that the motion was not privileged. State Representative Lane Denton then asked to be recognized from the back microphone of the House. Upon being recognized, Denton moved to appeal the ruling of the Chair and presented a signed list of ten members, the minimum needed under House rules, who were seconding his motion, the first known instance of the rule being used. Moore then made a point of order that the Speaker may not preside over an appeal of his ruling, a point that was upheld by the House Parliamentarian. Another member took the dais as the House debated the appeal. When the vote was called, Farenthold and her band of legislators lost 118-30, but a pro-Mutscher lobbyist cried out from the House gallery calling the band "those thirty dirty bastards," which others picked up on immediately, calling the group the "Dirty Thirty." While it had been meant as an insult, the thirty immediately approvingly adopted it as their moniker.

== Dirty Thirty's Mission ==
In a letter written by Farenthold in her personal papers held by the University of Texas School of Law's Tarlton Library, she described the purpose and mission of the Dirty Thirty thusly

The Dirty Thirty are liberals and conservatives, Democrats and Republicans, representatives of small towns and large cities, freshmen and veteran legislators. Because the Dirty Thirty all consider themselves independent, they are not a block of votes, and they often find themselves on different sides of substantive issues. The Dirty Thirty are a group of members of the Texas House of Representatives who find common ground by positively opposing the inadequate leadership of the Texas House and seeking to reform the rules and procedures by which the Texas House perpetuates insensitive and inadequate legislation.

== Outcome ==
Over the course of the 62nd Legislative session, the Dirty Thirty continued using the rules and amendment proposals to nettle Mutscher and keep the issue of the scandal alive, but became politically isolated as Mutscher retaliated by stripping Dirty Thirty members from their committee assignments. The Dirty Thirty introduced several ethics reform measures that were beaten back by Mutscher supporters. Other bills unrelated to reform measures filed by members of the Dirty Thirty often died in committee. Several member's districts were either eliminated, or redrawn to be more difficult to win, in the decennial redistricting that occurred during the session. After the session ended in May 1971, Mutscher himself was indicted on state charges by a Travis County grand jury in September 1971. When the Legislature was called into special session the following March, Mutscher had been convicted of conspiracy to accept a bribe and resigned as Speaker, but not as a member of the House.

== Members ==
The 30 House members voting against Speaker Mutscher ruling are considered the original core members of the Dirty Thirty. The group eventually numbered about 35 by the end of the 1971 legislative session.

Ten signatories appealing Mutscher ruling

Member	Party	Residence	Assumed office
Frances Farenthold	Democratic	Corpus Christi	1969
Lane Denton	Democratic	Waco	1971
Tom Moore, Jr.	Democratic	Waco	1967
Walter Mengden	Republican	Houston	1971
Richard "Dick" Reed	Democratic	Dallas	1969
John R. Bigham	Democratic	Belton	1969
Zan Holmes, Jr.	Democratic	Dallas	1968
Dave Allred	Democratic	Wichita Falls	1967
Curtis Graves	Democratic	Houston	1967
Nick Nichols	Democratic	Houston	1968
Fred Agnich	Republican	Dallas	1971
Maurice Angly, Jr.	Republican	Austin	1967
Bill Bass	Democratic	Van Zandt	1967
Tom Bass	Democratic	Houston	1963
William J. Blythe, Jr.	Republican	Houston	1971
Rex Braun	Democratic	Houston	1967
Neil Caldwell	Democratic	Alvin	1960
Tom Craddick	Republican	Midland	1969
Jim Earthman	Republican	Houston	1969
Bob Gammage	Democratic	Houston	1971
Ben Z. Grant	Democratic	Marshall	1971
John Hannah	Democratic	Lufkin	1967
Ed Harris	Democratic	Galveston	1963
Fred Head	Democratic	Henderson	1967
Edmund "Sonny" Jones	Republican	Houston	1967
Paul C. Moreno	Democratic	El Paso	1967
Charles Patterson	Democratic	Taylor	1969
Lindsey Rodriguez	Democratic	Hidalgo	1971
Carlos Truan	Democratic	Corpus Christi	1969
Bob Vale	Democratic	San Antonio	1965

== Legacy ==
Although the Dirty Thirty were unable to unseat Mutscher as Speaker during the regular session, the scandal and their opposition weakened his leadership. In the 1972 elections, a large number of incumbents connected to the scandal, including Mutscher, lost reelection. In the 1973 session of the Legislature, 16 of the 31 members of the Texas Senate and 71 members of the Texas House were freshmen legislators.

The following year, the 63rd Legislature enacted sweeping reforms, including the Texas Open Records Act (now known as Texas Public Information Act), campaign finance disclosure requirements, Texas Deceptive Trade Practices-Consumer Remedies Act, and new regulations on lobbyists. Historians generally credit the Dirty Thirty with sustaining public pressure that made these reforms possible.
