= 60th Texas Legislature =

The 60th Texas Legislature met from January 10, 1967, to May 29, 1967, and again in a special called session from June 4, 1968, to July 3, 1968. All members present during this session were elected in the 1966 general elections. The Democrats retained control of the Legislature.

== Sessions ==
- Regular session: January 10 – May 29, 1967
- Called session: June 4 – July 3, 1968

== Party summary ==
=== Senate ===
Affiliation	Members	Note
Democratic Party	29	
Republican Party	2	
Total	31	

=== House ===
Affiliation	Members	Note
Democratic Party	143	
Republican Party	7	
Total	150	

== Officers ==
=== Senate ===
- Lieutenant Governor: Preston Smith (D)
- President Pro Tempore (regular session): Bill Patman (D)
- President Pro Tempore (called session): James S. Bates (D)

=== House ===
- Speaker of the House: Ben Barnes (D)

== Members ==
=== Senate ===
Dist. 1

- A. M. Aikin Jr. (D), Paris

Dist. 2

- Jack Strong (D), Longview

Dist. 3

- Charlie Wilson (D), Lufkin

Dist. 4

- D. Roy Harrington (D), Port Arthur

Dist. 5

- William T. Moore (D), Bryan

Dist. 6

- Criss Cole (D), Houston

Dist. 7

- Chet Brooks (D), Pasadena

Dist. 8

- O. H. Harris (R), Dallas

Dist. 9

- Ralph Hall (D), Rockwall

Dist. 10

- Don Kennard (D), Fort Worth

Dist. 11

- Barbara Jordan (D), Houston

Dist. 12

- J. P. Word (D), Meridian

Dist. 13

- Murray Watson Jr. (D), Waco

Dist. 14

- Charles F. Herring (D), Austin

Dist. 15

- Henry Grover (R), Houston

Dist. 16

- Jim Wade (D), Dallas

Dist. 17

- A. R. Schwartz (D), Galveston

Dist. 18

- Bill Patman (D), Ganado

Dist. 19

- V. E. Berry (D), San Antonio

Dist. 20

- Bruce Reagan (D), Corpus Christi

Dist. 21

- Wayne Connally (D), Floresville

Dist. 22

- Tom Creighton (D), Mineral Wells

Dist. 23

- Oscar Mauzy (D), Dallas

Dist. 24

- David Ratliff (D), Stamford

Dist. 25

- Dorsey B. Hardeman (D), San Angelo

Dist. 26

- Joe J. Bernal (D), San Antonio

Dist. 27

- James Bates (D), Edinburg

Dist. 28

- H. J. Blanchard (D), Lubbock

Dist. 29

- Joe Christie (D), El Paso

Dist. 30

- Jack Hightower (D), Vernon

Dist. 31

- Grady Hazlewood (D), Canyon

=== House ===
Dist. 1

- Bob Bass (D), DeKalb

Dist. 84

- Malouf Abraham (R), Canadian

Dist. 12

- Bill Bass (D), Ben Wheeler

Dist. 13

- John Allen (D), Longview

Dist. 23-3

- Joe Allen (D), Baytown

Dist. 22-5

- W.R. 'Bill' Archer (D), Houston

Dist. 40-F

- Bob Armstrong (D), Austin

Dist. 33-2

- Ben Atwell (D), Hutchins

Dist. 49-3

- A.C. 'Bud' Atwood (D), Edinburg

Dist. 64

- Ben Barnes (D), De Leon

Dist. 83

- Bill W. Barton (D), Borger

Dist. 24-1

- Tom Bass (D), Houston

Dist. 30

- Otha Wyatt Birkner (D), Bay City

Dist. 31

- Vernon Beckham (D), Denison

Dist. 85-2

- Dave Allred (D), Wichita Falls

Dist. 67-2

- John E. Blaine (D), El Paso

Dist. 33-13

- Jack Blanton (D), Carrollton

Dist. 33-1

- Bill Braecklein (D), Dallas

Dist. 23-4

- Rex Braun (D), Houston

Dist. 45-3

- Ronald W. Bridges (D), Corpus Christi

Dist. 4

- Steve Burgess (D), Nacogdoches

Dist. 70

- Frank Cahoon (R), Midland

Dist. 39-2

- Pat Cain (D), Austin

Dist. 19

- Neil Caldwell (D), Alvin

Dist. 62-F

- Frank Calhoun (D), Abilene

Dist. 50

- Oscar Carrillo, Sr. (D), Benavides

Dist. 39-3

- Donald Word Cavness (D), Austin

Dist. 24-4

- James Atmar "Jim" Clark (D), Pasadena

Dist. 33-12

- James Howard "Jim Clark, Jr. (D), Dallas

Dist. 78

- Bill Wayne "Billy" Clayton (D), Springlake

Dist. 25

- James Dee Cole (D), Greenville

Dist. 43

- Richard Henry "Dick" Cory (D), Victoria

Dist. 6

- David William Crews (D), Conroe
