= 1972 Texas Senate election =

- November 7, 1972

All 31 seats in the Texas Senate 16 seats needed for a majority
	Majority party	Minority party
Party	Democratic	Republican
Last election	29	2
Seats won	28	3
Seat change	▼1	▲1
Popular vote	2,012,582	611,869
Percentage	76.14%	23.15%
Swing	▼7.94%	▲7.28%
- Senate results by district Democratic hold Republican hold Republican gain
President Pro Tempore before election
Democratic
Elected President Pro Tempore
Democratic

The 1972 Texas Senate elections took place as part of the biennial United States elections. Texas voters elected state senators in all 31 state senate districts. The winners of this election served in the 63rd Texas Legislature, serving staggered terms, with half of them up for election in 1974 and the other half up in 1976.

== Background ==
Democrats had controlled the Texas Senate since the 1872 elections. In 1971, a number of high-profile Democratic politicians came under scrutiny from the Securities and Exchange Commission for alleged illegal stock trading. The ensuing scandal, which became known as the Sharpstown stock-fraud scandal, enveloped figures such as Governor Preston Smith, Lieutenant Governor Ben Barnes, and House Speaker Gus Mutscher. Mutscher, among others, would later be convicted for his part in the scandal.

=== Redistricting ===
The legislature failed to pass new districts for the Senate during its regular session, and they did not pass them during the subsequent special session, either. This forced the Legislative Redistricting Board, made up of four statewide elected officials and the Speaker of the House, to convene for the first time to draw them, instead. The board had been established by a 1948 constitutional amendment passed in response to the legislature's failure to redraw state legislative boundaries after the 1930 or 1940 censuses. The board was made up entirely of Democrats, and they passed a map that was gerrymandered to favor them. The map drew two lawsuits, one by Republicans who challenged the districts in Bexar County, and another by Dallas Democrat Curtis Graves, who argued that the districts in Harris County illegally diluted the votes of minority voters.

The board's map indeed dispersed the county's African American neighborhoods between several districts to shore up their Democratic voting bases. This dismantled the seat held by Barbara Jordan, the first African American elected to the chamber since the 19th century, but she instead ran for congress in the newly-created majority Black 18th congressional district. The lawsuits against the plan were consolidated with two other suits against the board's map for the House of Representatives under Graves v. Barnes. The district court denied both claims, upholding the board's map, a decision which would later be upheld by the U. S. Supreme Court in Archer v. Smith.

== Results ==
The Sharpstown scandal rocked both the primary and general elections. Reform-minded candidates, both Democrats and Republicans, ousted dozens of incumbents across both chambers. Of the 31 seats up for election to the Senate, 15 elected new members. Alongside Republican Richard Nixon's landslide victory in the concurrent presidential election, Republicans gained one seat, reducing the Democratic supermajority to 28 out of 31 seats. With the dismantling of Barbara Jordan's seat in Harris County, the chamber no longer had any African American members.

=== Results by district ===
District	Democratic		Republican		Others		Total		Result
District	Votes	%	Votes	%	Votes	%	Votes	%	Result
District 1	77,063	100.00%	-	-	-	-	77,063	100.00%	Democratic hold
District 2	77,857	100.00%	-	-	-	-	77,857	100.00%	Democratic hold
District 3	81,098	100.00%	-	-	-	-	81,098	100.00%	Democratic hold
District 4	74,940	100.00%	-	-	-	-	74,940	100.00%	Democratic hold
District 5	82,568	100.00%	-	-	-	-	82,568	100.00%	Democratic hold
District 6	23,802	100.00%	-	-	-	-	23,802	100.00%	Democratic hold
District 7	69,032	58.37%	49,236	41.63%	-	-	118,268	100.00%	Democratic hold
District 8	-	-	88,708	100.00%	-	-	88,708	100.00%	Republican hold
District 9	55,689	57.16%	41,733	42.84%	-	-	97,422	100.00%	Democratic hold
District 10	58,016	63.59%	33,215	36.41%	-	-	91,231	100.00%	Democratic hold
District 11	28,895	100.00%	-	-	-	-	28,895	100.00%	Democratic hold
District 12	56,087	48.04%	60,654	51.96%	-	-	116,741	100.00%	Republican gain
District 13	53,681	36.12%	94,934	63.88%	-	-	148,615	100.00%	Republican hold
District 14	107,128	91.41%	-	-	10,071	8.59%	117,199	100.00%	Democratic hold
District 15	59,057	55.54%	47,282	44.46%	-	-	106,339	100.00%	Democratic hold
District 16	56,126	51.99%	51,833	48.01%	-	-	107,959	100.00%	Democratic hold
District 17	58,659	54.54%	48,897	45.46%	-	-	107,556	100.00%	Democratic hold
District 18	57,917	71.34%	23,264	28.66%	-	-	81,181	100.00%	Democratic hold
District 19	54,993	100.00%	-	-	-	-	54,993	100.00%	Democratic hold
District 20	77,390	100.00%	-	-	-	-	77,390	100.00%	Democratic hold
District 21	73,318	100.00%	-	-	-	-	73,318	100.00%	Democratic hold
District 22	86,297	100.00%	-	-	-	-	86,297	100.00%	Democratic hold
District 23	62,338	100.00%	-	-	-	-	62,338	100.00%	Democratic hold
District 24	83,735	100.00%	-	-	-	-	83,735	100.00%	Democratic hold
District 25	83,949	100.00%	-	-	-	-	83,949	100.00%	Democratic hold
District 26	60,504	69.14%	27,010	30.86%	-	-	87,514	100.00%	Democratic hold
District 27	49,654	61.54%	22,275	27.61%	8,757	10.85%	80,686	100.00%	Democratic hold
District 28	82,109	100.00%	-	-	-	-	82,109	100.00%	Democratic hold
District 29	53,984	70.28%	22,828	29.72%	-	-	76,812	100.00%	Democratic hold
District 30	84,753	100.00%	-	-	-	-	84,753	100.00%	Democratic hold
District 31	81,943	100.00%	-	-	-	-	81,943	100.00%	Democratic hold
Total	2,012,582	76.14%	611,869	23.15%	18,828	0.71%	2,643,279	100.00%	Source:
