= 1962 Texas Attorney General election =

- November 6, 1962
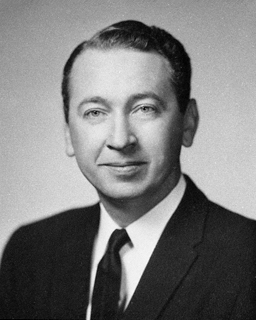

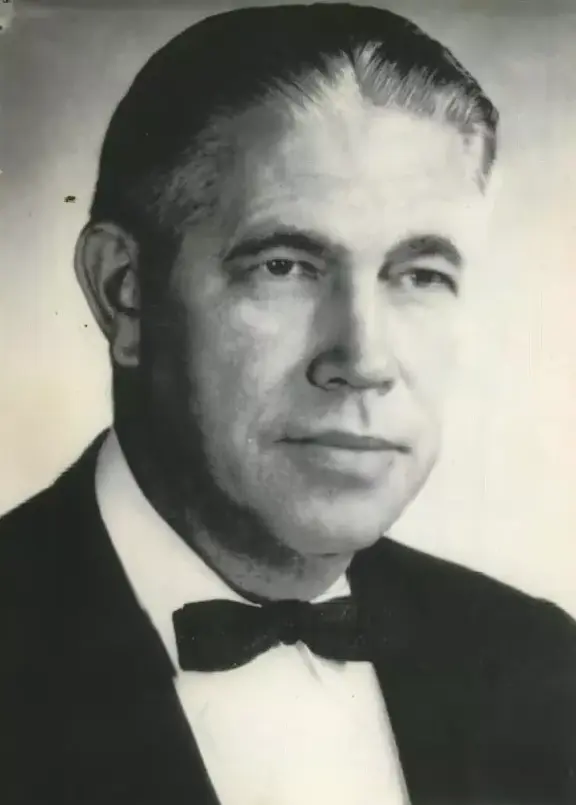
Nominee	Waggoner Carr	T.E. Kennerly
Party	Democratic	Republican
Popular vote	1,031,118	523,116
Percentage	66.3%	33.7%
Attorney General before election
Will Wilson
Democratic
Elected Attorney General
Waggoner Carr
Democratic

The 1962 Texas Attorney General election took place on November 6, 1962, to elect the Texas Attorney General. Democratic nominee Waggoner Carr defeated Republican nominee T. E. Kennerly.

== Democratic primary ==
The incumbent Attorney General Will Wilson chose to run for governor instead of seeking reelection.

=== Candidates ===
==== Nominee ====
- Waggoner Carr, Speaker of the Texas House of Representatives

==== Eliminated in primary ====
- Tom Reavley, former Texas Secretary of State, former Nacodoches County Attorney, former assistant district attorney of Dallas
- Tom James, state representative
- Leslie "Les" Procter, Travis County Attorney
- WIlliam Thomas "W. T." McDonald, former state representative
- Bob Looney

=== Results ===
Democratic primary
Party	Candidate	Votes	%
Democratic	Waggoner Carr	563,021	43.1%
Democratic	Tom Reavley	285,696	21.9%
Democratic	Tom James	173,270	13.3%
Democratic	Les Procter	136,943	10.5%
Democratic	W. T. McDonald	106,534	8.2%
Democratic	Bob Looney	40,687	3.1%
Total votes		1,180,958	100.0%

Democratic primary runoff
Party	Candidate	Votes	%
Democratic	Waggoner Carr	613,477	57.9%
Democratic	Tom Reavley	445,771	42.1%
Total votes		1,059,248	100.0%

== General election ==
=== Results ===
November 6, 1962 Texas Attorney General election
Party	Candidate	Votes	%
Democratic	Waggoner Carr	1,031,118	69.6%
Republican	T. E. Kennerly	523,116	33.7%
Total votes		1,554,234	100.00%
Democratic hold			
