= Byron M. Tunnell =

American politician

Railroad Commissioner of Texas
- In office January 11, 1965 – September 15, 1973
- Governor: John Connally; Preston Smith; Dolph Briscoe
- Preceded by: Ernest O. Thompson
- Succeeded by: Mack Wallace

Speaker of the Texas House of Representatives
- In office January 8, 1963 – January 8, 1965
- Preceded by: Jimmy Turman
- Succeeded by: Ben Barnes

Member of the Texas House of Representatives from the 15-F district
- In office January 8, 1957 – January 8, 1965
- Preceded by: Bill D. Wood
- Succeeded by: John A. Mobley Jr.

Personal details
- Born: Byron Milton Tunnell; October 14, 1925 Tyler, Texas, U.S.
- Died: March 7, 2000 (aged 74) Austin, Texas, U.S.
- Party: Democratic
- Spouse: Bette Lemons (m. 1945; died 1988)
- Education: Tyler Junior College; Baylor Law School
- Occupation: Attorney

Military service
- Allegiance: United States
- Branch/service: United States Navy
- Battles/wars: World War II

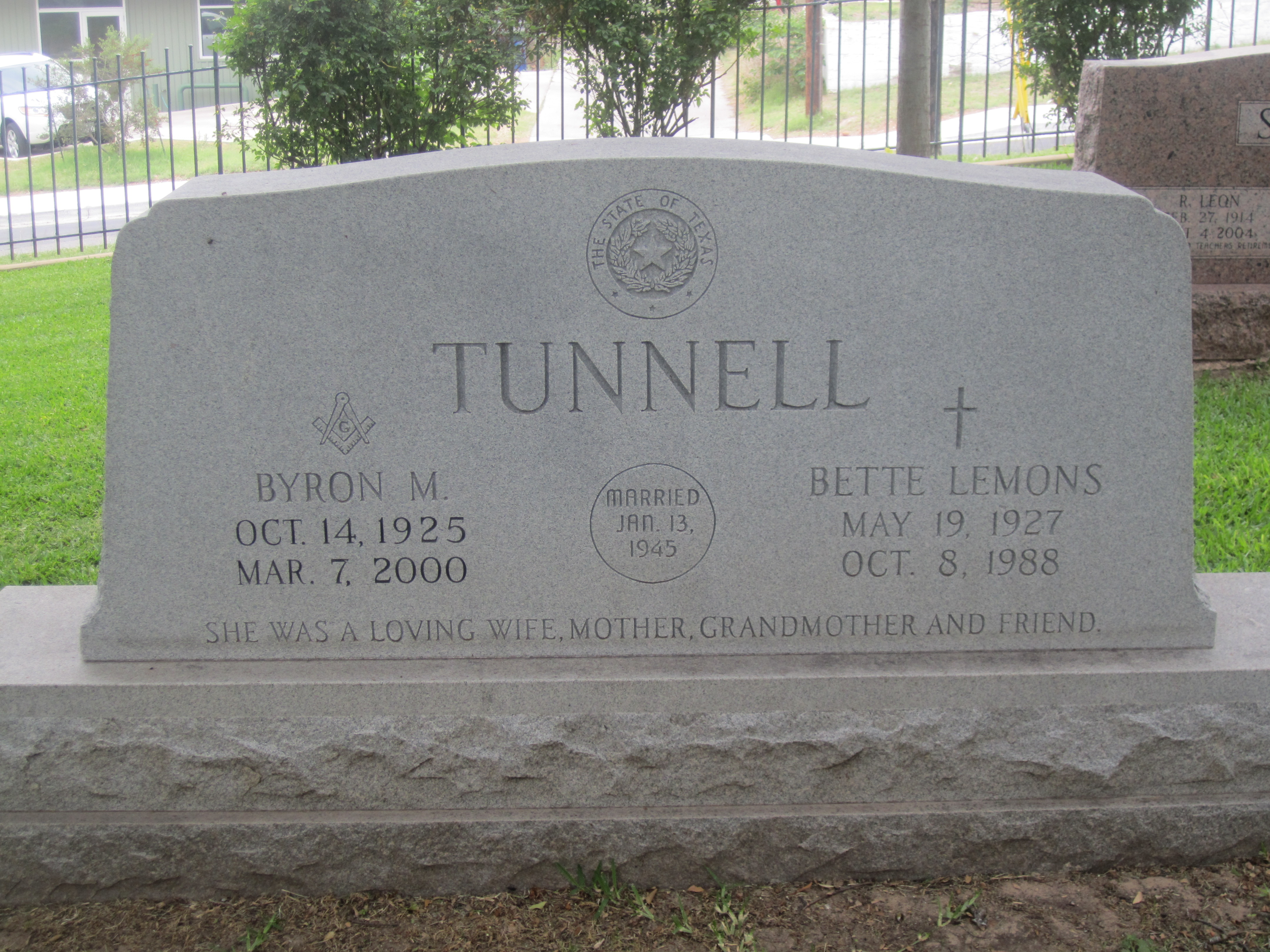
Tunnell grave at Texas State Cemetery in Austin, Texas

Byron Milton Tunnell (October 14, 1925 – March 7, 2000) was a state representative from 1957 to 1965, Speaker of the Texas House of Representatives from 1963 to 1965, and a member of the Texas Railroad Commission from 1965 to 1973.

== Biography ==
=== Early life ===
Tunnell was born in Tyler, the county seat of Smith County and the largest city in east Texas, and educated in public schools. He graduated from Tyler High School and Tyler Junior College, then joined the United States Navy Air Corps during World War II as a tail gunner. On January 13, 1945, he married Bette Lemons (1927–1988).

In 1952, Tunnell received his law degree from Baylor Law School in Waco and returned to Tyler to become an assistant district attorney before entering private practice. He was joined by future Comptroller and Lieutenant Governor Bob Bullock in 1959, and the two formed a close bond.

=== Speaker of the Texas House ===
Tunnell was first elected to the Texas House in 1956. In the two years that he served as Speaker, which coincided with the first two years of the administration of Governor John B. Connally, Jr., the legislature created the Texas Parks and Wildlife Department, the state's first tourism department, and transferred what would become Padre Island National Seashore to the national government. On November 22, 1963, Tunnell was present at the Fort Worth breakfast at the Hotel Texas held for U.S. President John F. Kennedy shortly before his assassination later in the day. Others at the gathering included Texas Attorney General Waggoner Carr.

=== Railroad Commissioner ===
In 1965, Governor Connally appointed Tunnell to the Texas Railroad Commission upon the retirement of 32-year veteran Ernest O. Thompson. Ben Barnes was then elected Speaker. Tunnell was twice elected to the Railroad Commission—1966 and 1972—before he resigned in 1973 to become a vice president and lobbyist for Houston-based Tenneco, a petroleum and natural gas company. One of his lobbyist colleagues was former state Representative Phil Cates, formerly of Wheeler County. Tunnell's service as Railroad Commissioner overlapped with the energy crisis of the early 1970s.

=== Later career ===
In 1995, Governor George W. Bush appointed Tunnell to the State Conservatorship Board to overhaul and reorganize the troubled Texas Commission on Alcohol and Drug Abuse.

=== Death ===
Tunnell died of cancer in Lake Palestine on March 7, 2000. He and his wife are interred at the Texas State Cemetery in Austin.
