= Tom Moore Jr. =

American politician (1918–2017)

Tom Moore Jr. (May 16, 1918 – April 16, 2017) was a Democratic member of the Texas House of Representatives from 1967 to 1973 from McLennan County. Moore is most noted for an April Fool's Day prank he played to demonstrate that his fellow legislators often did not read the legislation they were approving and for being a member of the "Dirty Thirty."

== Biography ==
Moore was born in Waco, Texas, May 16, 1918. He served in the U.S. Army from 1943 to 1946. From 1952–1959, as McLennan County district attorney, Moore prosecuted "the first criminal trial to be televised in the United States."

== Boston Strangler prank ==
Moore introduced legislation on April 1, 1971 commending Albert DeSalvo—more commonly known as the Boston Strangler—including this wording:

This compassionate gentleman's dedication and devotion to his work has enabled the weak and the lonely throughout the nation to achieve and maintain a new degree of concern for their future. He has been officially recognized by the state of Massachusetts for his noted activities and unconventional techniques involving population control and applied psychology.

After it was passed unanimously by the House, Moore later withdrew the legislation, explaining he had only offered it to prove an important point that his fellow legislators didn't read much of the legislation they voted on.

== Dirty Thirty ==
Moore, along with 29 other bipartisan members of the 1971 Texas House of Representatives, became known as the "Dirty Thirty" after allying against the then-Speaker of the House Gus Franklin Mutscher and other Texas officials who had been charged in a bribery-conspiracy investigation by the United States Securities and Exchange Commission. The Dirty Thirty kept the Sharpstown Stock-Fraud Scandal alive as a political issue. Even though Mutscher was still favored by a majority in the House, they called for a resolution to make Mutscher and his associates resign from leadership positions while the SEC investigation continued. Because of Mutscher's favored position, however, the measure failed. Another resolution for the House to make itself a committee to study the SEC allegation also failed. The Dirty Thirty's criticisms of Mutscher's system of controlling legislation eventually led Mutscher to agree to an investigation led by five of his closest House allies, all chairmen of other committees he had appointed. On the next-to-last day of the session, Mutscher attacked the Dirty Thirty, accusing them of irresponsible, partisan politics. The Dirty Thirty for their part called Mutscher a dictator over state politics, more concerned with private than public interests. This began the electoral battle, which Mutscher lost.

Mutscher, along with two other colleagues (Governor Preston Smith and Lieutenant Governor Ben Barnes), were indicted by a Travis County grand jury in September 1971 for conspiracy to accept a bribe and accepting a bribe. Mutscher was tried, found guilty, and sentenced to five years' probation. Mutscher's colleagues, though not brought to trial, saw their political careers effectively ended. The Dirty Thirty also paid a price – Mutscher blocked most of their legislation actions and they were isolated from other Texas legislators. Moore died in April 2017 at the age of 98.

Texas House of Representatives
Preceded by George Cowden	Member of the Texas House of Representatives from District 35-2 (Waco); 1967–73	Succeeded by Lyndon Olson Jr.
