= 1974 Texas Senate election =

- November 5, 1974

15 of the 31 seats in the Texas Senate 16 seats needed for a majority
	Majority party	Minority party
Party	Democratic	Republican
Last election	28	3
Seats won	28	3
Seat change	Steady	Steady
Popular vote	515,612	141,751
Percentage	78.43%	21.56%
Swing	▲2.29%	▼1.59%
- Senate results by district Democratic hold Republican hold No election
President Pro Tempore before election
Democratic
Elected President Pro Tempore
Democratic

The 1974 Texas Senate elections took place as part of the biennial United States elections. Texas voters elected state senators 15 of the 31 State Senate districts. The winners of this election served in the 64th Texas Legislature for four-year terms.

== Background ==
Democrats had controlled the Texas Senate since the 1872 elections. Long a part of the Solid South, Republicans had gained a foothold in the state in the past two decades, electing U.S. Senator John Tower in 1961 and electing Richard Nixon with 66% of the vote in 1972, but these gains rarely made much impact in downballot, local races. Democrats had controlled every statewide office since the end of Reconstruction and controlled large supermajorities in the legislature. Even these small numbers were an improvement from the past decade, however, such as after the 1964 election when they held a single seat in the House and none in the Senate.

=== Corruption reforms ===
In the fallout of the Sharpstown stock-fraud scandal, which had rocked Texas politics during the 62nd legislature in 1971, nearly a majority of the entire legislature was composed of newly-elected members after the 1972 election. Led by the "Dirty Thirty," who had kept the scandal at the forefront of the previous session, the new legislature passed a wave of reforms. These included the Texas Open Records Act, campaign finance disclosure requirements, regulations on deceptive trade practices, and new regulations on lobbyists.

The legislature in 1971 had also proposed the calling of a new constitutional convention, which voters approved in 1972. The convention met in the Spring of 1974, but by the time the convention concluded, the vote to pass the new constitution failed to reach the required two-thirds supermajority of the unicameral body by three votes.

== Results ==
Alongside Democrat Dolph Briscoe's landslide victory in the concurrent gubernatorial election, Democrats held onto all of their seats in the Senate, maintaining their 28–3 supermajority in the chamber.

=== Results by district ===
District	Democratic		Republican		Write-in		Total		Result
District	Votes	%	Votes	%	Votes	%	Votes	%	Result
District 1	46,001	100.00%	-	-	0	0.00%	46,001	100.00%	Democratic hold
District 2	40,692	72.47%	15,453	27.52%	2	0.00%	55,625	100.00%	Democratic hold
District 3	42,793	99.99%	-	-	6	0.01%	42,799	100.00%	Democratic hold
District 6	10,652	100.00%	-	-	0	0.00%	10,652	100.00%	Democratic hold
District 10	32,814	79.78%	8,319	20.22%	0	0.00%	41,133	100.00%	Democratic hold
District 11	13,849	100.00%	-	-	0	0.00%	13,849	100.00%	Democratic hold
District 12	24,861	49.49%	25,371	50.51%	0	0.00%	50,232	100.00%	Republican hold
District 14	54,544	63.51%	31,340	36.49%	2	0.00%	85,886	100.00%	Democratic hold
District 21	44,961	74.70%	15,226	25.30%	1	0.00%	60,188	100.00%	Democratic hold
District 23	10,076	70.86%	-	-	0	0.00%	10,076	100.00%	Democratic hold
District 25	50,040	99.99%	-	-	5	0.01%	50,045	100.00%	Democratic hold
District 26	33,646	67.43%	16,249	32.57%	0	0.00%	49,895	100.00%	Democratic hold
District 27	26,451	100.00%	-	-	0	0.00%	26,451	100.00%	Democratic hold
District 28	33,088	67.30%	16,076	32.70%	0	0.00%	49,164	100.00%	Democratic hold
District 30	51,144	78.85%	13,717	21.15%	1	0.00%	64,862	100.00%	Democratic hold
Total	515,612	78.43%	141,751	21.56%	17	0.00%	657,380	100.00%	Source:
