= Frank Sharp (land developer) =

Texan land developer

- Born: Frank Wesley Sharp; March 18, 1906
- Died: April 2, 1993 (aged 87); Houston, Texas, US
- Occupations: Real estate developer; banker
- Years active: 1925-1971
- Known for: Major real estate developments; major Texas financial scandal
- Notable work: Sharpstown, Oak Forest

Frank Wesley Sharp (March 18, 1906 – April 2, 1993) was a land developer in Houston, Texas, United States who was responsible for creating several large post-World War II housing developments.

Sharp's largest projects included Oak Forest in 1946 and Sharpstown in 1955. Sharp also created Royden Oaks in the early 1970s. Sharp later was a central figure in the Sharpstown scandal, and as a result he was convicted of violating federal banking and securities laws and was sentenced to three years' probation and a $5,000 fine.

== Early life ==
Frank W. Sharp, usually known as simply Frank Sharp, was born on March 18, 1906, on an east Texas farm the near the small town of Crockett in Houston County, Texas, where he lived until he finished high school. Determined to improve his lot in life, he left home at the age of 19 and headed to Houston, where he then settled. He soon got a job as a carpenter's helper during the day, while he began attending a business college at night. These actions started him on the path to becoming a major real estate developer in southeast Texas.

During the 1930s, the Houston area was reasonably well insulated from the grim economic realities of the Great Depression by the completion of the Houston Ship Channel and the rise of the petroleum industry. Sharp reportedly borrowed $150 and began building one house at a time in subdivisions that were beginning to surround the city. Soon, he advanced to building multiple homes in subdivisions like Jacinto City and Texas City during World War II.

== Oak Forest development ==
Toward the end of World War II, Sharp shrewdly guessed that Houston would continue growing to the northwest, beyond the Garden Oaks subdivision, which architect E. L. Crain had opened in 1937. In 1946, Sharp hired the architectural firm, Wilson, Morris and Crain, and bought 113 acres (46 ha) of land adjacent to Garden Oaks, where he began constructing prefabricated and preassembled homes on 4780 lots by mid-1947. He named his new subdivision Oak Forest.

Intending to remain involved in all phases of the development, Sharp reorganized his business empire to accomplish that goal. His Frank W. Sharp Enterprises, became an umbrella company that ran four smaller entities: (a) a firm doing concrete and street work; (b) the Douglas Fir Lumber Company, whose two mills in the Northwest prevented Sharp from suffering widespread shortages of lumber; (c) the Oak Forest Corporation to handle development and merchandising; and (d) the Frank W. Sharp Construction Company to handle the building. A separate, but closely connected, company took care of the millwork.

In July 1948, the popular and well-respected magazine Better Homes and Gardens (BH&G) featured several Oak Forest homes in an article, and said that the proposed investment of $32 million and projected population of 25,000 made Oak Forest, "one of the largest privately financed, single-family home developments in United States or world history." By then, many potential customers had come to think of prefabricated, prebuilt, and planned housing developments as monotonous, and lacking individuality. Sharp adopted a marketing slogan of, "No two houses are alike." The BH&G article noted that, "among the first 400 homes built in Oak Forest, only two were alike in planning and only two were white in color."

By September 1948 rising costs for materials and overheads were cutting deeply into Sharp's profit margin. He responded by contracting out the actual construction. (Note: Smaller subcontractors could often undercut him by having lower labor costs.) Sharp's organization could still offer cheaper prices for lumber and office support. In 1953, Sharp announced that he would open Peoples State Bank in Oak Forest. He also planned to open a 12,000 square feet (1,100 m^{2}) shopping center on the border between Oak Park and Garden Oaks in May 1953.

== Sharpstown ==
Oak Forest was essentially "built out" by 1955, but Frank Sharp already had a vision for an even greater development. He had already bought an expanse of land at the southwest edge of Houston and near the northeastern limit of Bellaire, Texas. Promotional literature at the time described it as "the biggest real-estate subdivision in the world: 25,000 homes, 100,000 people." (Note: Even Popular Science magazine ran a laudatory article, calling the development, "the Suburb of Tomorrow". Sharpstown did not live up to the hype. At its peak, it had 15,000 homes on 4,000 acres (1,600 ha).) Frank named it Sharpstown.

In 1961, Sharp had added Sharpstown State Bank to his holdings, and in 1963, he bought National Bankers Life. By the early 1970s, Sharp had added banking and insurance to his empire. Wanting to assure passage of a bill that would help his banking enterprise (Sharpstown State Bank), he decided to offer unsecured bank loans to a number of key politicians. The politicians who were willingly ensnared in these dealings included then governor of Texas, Preston Smith, Speaker of the House Gus Mutscher, Texas House Representatives W. S. Heatley and Tommy L. Shannon, and Texas Democratic Party chairman, Dr. Elmer Baum. They, in turn agreed to use the loans to buy stock in Sharp's insurance company (National Bankers Life). About the same time, Sharpstown State Bank made unsecured loans to Sharp's son-in-law, W. D. Haden II, who was then trying to buy a controlling interest in Olympic Life Insurance Company of Fort Worth. Concerned by the number and size of the loans Sharpstown bank was making, the Federal Deposit Insurance Corporation (FDIC) notified bank management that the FDIC might cancel its deposit insurance if it did not immediately cease making these dubious loans.

Though a life-long Methodist, he became a generous donor to Strake Jesuit College Preparatory and became the only Protestant to be named as a "founder" within the benefactors of the Society of Jesus. He was so highly regarded by the pope and other members of the Church hierarchy that he was honored in Rome. (Note: Sharp had been invited to the Vatican, where Pope Paul VI made him a founder of the New Orleans Province of the Society of Jesus.) During the Sharpstown scandal, Sharp advised Strake Jesuit to buy shares of National Bankers Life at $20–26 per share. The school lost $6,000,000 from his advice.

=== Sharpstown bribery scandal ===
Thee Securities and Exchange Commission (SEC) began uncovering evidence of wrongdoing in 1971, and soon began giving information to the press. On January 18, 1971, the SEC came before the federal court in Dallas to formally charge former Democratic State Attorney General Waggoner Carr, former State Insurance Commissioner John Osorio, Frank Sharp, a number of other defendants, and Sharp's corporations, including the Sharpstown State Bank and National Bankers Life Insurance Corporation, with stock fraud in a scheme hatched by Sharp himself. The suit started a run on the bank by its depositors, which was quelled by the FDIC. (Note: The Sharpstown State Bank closure was then the biggest bank failure in the history of the Federal Deposit Insurance Corporation.)

Speaker of the House Mutscher and his close associates, Heatley and Shannon, thereafter, frequently called the "Abilene Three" by the press, were charged in an Abilene court with accepting a bribe from Sharp. During the trial, the district attorney revealed that Governor Smith was an unindicted co-conspirator. On March 15, 1972, after only 120 minutes of deliberation by the jury, the trial ended with a guilty verdict for each of the three. The next day, Judge J. Neil Daniel sentenced them to five years' probation.

Sharp himself pleaded guilty to all charges. He was fined $5,000 and sentenced to three years' probation for violating federal banking and securities laws.
