= Killer Bees (Texas Senate) =

Group of Texas Senators

The Killer Bees were a group of twelve Democratic Texas state senators who gained national attention in 1979 when they broke quorum in the Texas Senate to block consideration of an election bill. The walkout, which lasted four-and-a-half days, prevented the Senate from conducting business.

== Background ==
In 1979, the Texas Legislature considered a bill to separate the 1980 presidential primary election from the state’s general primary. Under the proposal, Texas would hold an early presidential primary in March, followed by a later statewide primary in May.

Supporters argued that this would give Texas more influence in national presidential politics. Critics saw the measure as a maneuver to help former Texas Governor John B. Connally, who had switched parties and was seeking the Republican nomination for president in 1980. By splitting the primaries, the bill would have allowed conservative Democrats to vote in the Republican presidential primary for Connally while still participating in the later Democratic primary for state offices.

Opponents charged that the bill would distort party politics, encourage cross-party manipulation, and cost Texas taxpayers millions of dollars.

== Walkout ==
On May 18, 1979, twelve Democratic senators left the chamber to prevent the Texas Senate from reaching the quorum of 21 members required to conduct business. Without a quorum, the Senate was unable to take up the primary bill.

Ten of the senators went into hiding in an Austin garage apartment while two hid out elsewhere. To avoid detection by Texas Rangers and Senate officers sent to compel their return, the group kept a low profile and relied on supporters to bring them food and supplies.

The Texas Rangers nearly nabbed one of the senators, Gene Jones, when he went home to Houston to visit his granddaughter. Rangers arrived at Jones's home and compared the man who answered the door with a photo of Jones and asked the man if he was Jones. The man answered in the affirmative and was arrested and taken to Austin to the Senate chamber, only the Jones they arrested was the senator's brother, Clayton Jones. As a result of the incident, members of the media dubbed the Rangers the "Bumble Bees."

There is dispute over how the group got its nickname. Some attribute the nickname "Killer Bees" to journalists covering the standoff, who joked that the senators had "buzzed off;" however, the Senate's presiding officer, Lt. Governor Bill Hobby Jr., said he named them that because "you never know when they would strike." The 19 Senators who remained behind were dubbed the "Worker Bees."

The walkout lasted four-and-a-half days. The deadlock ended when Hobby, the conservative Democrats and Republicans agreed to drop the bill, effectively killing the bill for the session.

== Outcome and legacy ==
The Killer Bees's action successfully blocked the separate presidential primary legislation, preventing Democrats from legally crossing over to vote for Connally in the Republican contest. The episode underscored divisions within the Texas Democratic Party between its liberal and conservative wings and demonstrated the power of quorum-busting tactics in the state legislature.

Quorum-busting tactics in Texas date back to 1870. Texas lawmakers have subsequently engaged in quorum busting twice in 2003 (the House in the General Legislative session and the Senate in Special Session), 2021 and 2025.

== Members ==
The twelve members of the Killer Bees were:

Senator	District	Party	Residence	Other information
Gene Jones	7	Democratic	Houston	
Carl Parker	4	Democratic	Port Arthur	Senate President Pro Tempore (1987–1989)
Oscar Mauzy	23	Democratic	Dallas	Senate President Pro Tempore (1973–1975); later State Supreme Court Justice (1987–1992)
Lloyd Doggett	14	Democratic	Austin	later State Supreme Court Justice (1989–1994); later U.S. Congressman (1995–present)
Carlos Truan	20	Democratic	Corpus Christi	Member of the Dirty Thirty (1971–1972); Senate President Pro Tempore (1985–1987); Dean of the Senate (1993–2003)
W.N. 'Bill' Patman	18	Democratic	Ganado	Senate President Pro Tempore (1967–1969); Son of U.S. Congressman Wright Patman
Chet Brooks	11	Democratic	Pasadena	Senate President Pro Tempore (1971–1973); Dean of the Senate (1981–1993)
Bob Vale	26	Democratic	San Antonio	Member of the Dirty Thirty (1971–1972)
Ron Clower	9	Democratic	Garland	
Raul Longoria	27	Democratic	Edinburg	Senate President Pro Tempore (1977–1979)
Glenn Kothmann	19	Democratic	San Antonio	Senate President Pro Tempore (1975–1977)
A.R. 'Babe' Schwartz	17	Democratic	Galveston	Senate President Pro Tempore (1965–1967)
