= Jack Connell =

Jack Connell may refer to:

- Jack Connell (Georgia politician) (1919–2013), American politician in the Georgia House of Representatives
- Jack W. Connell Jr. (born 1937), American politician in the Texas House of Representatives
- Jack Connell (footballer) (1912–1983), Australian rules footballer
