= Robert Gammage =

American politician (1938–2012)

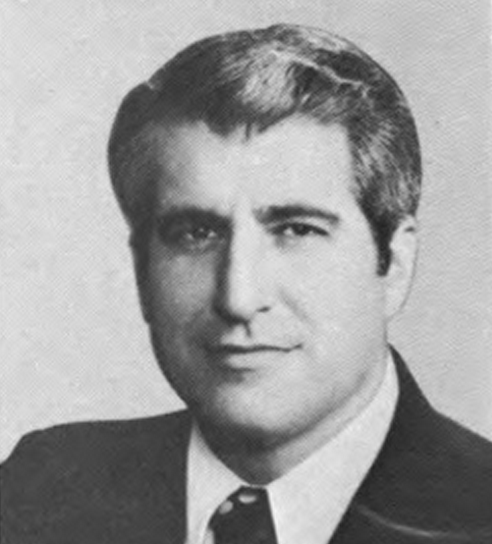
- Official portrait, 1977

Justice of the Texas Supreme Court
- In office January 2, 1991 – September 1, 1995
- Preceded by: C. L. Ray Jr.
- Succeeded by: James A. Baker

Texas Third Court of Appeals Justice
- In office 1982–1991

Member of the U.S. House of Representatives from Texas's 22nd district
- In office January 3, 1977 – January 3, 1979
- Preceded by: Ron Paul
- Succeeded by: Ron Paul

Member of the Texas Senate from the 7th district
- In office January 9, 1973 – January 23, 1976
- Preceded by: Chet Brooks
- Succeeded by: Gene Jones

Member of the Texas House of Representatives from the 24-3 district
- In office January 12, 1971 – January 9, 1973
- Preceded by: Arthur Vance
- Succeeded by: District rearranged

Personal details
- Born: Robert Alton Gammage; March 13, 1938 Houston, Texas, U.S.
- Died: September 10, 2012 (aged 74) Austin, Texas, U.S.
- Party: Democratic
- Spouse: Lynda Hallmark
- Education: Del Mar College (A.A.); Univ. of Corpus Christi (B.S.); Sam Houston State Univ. (M.A.); University of Texas (J.D.); University of Virginia (LL.M.)
- Occupation: Lawyer; Professor

Military service
- Allegiance: United States
- Branch/service: United States Army; United States Navy
- Years of service: 1959–1960 (Active Army); 1960–1964 (Army Reserve); 1965–1995 (Naval Reserve)
- Rank: Navy Captain
- Unit: U.S. Navy J.A.G. Corps

Robert Alton Gammage (March 13, 1938 – September 10, 2012) was an American politician, having served as a Democrat in the Texas House of Representatives, the Texas State Senate, and the United States House of Representatives.

== Early life and education ==
Gammage was born in Houston and attended Milby High School there. He earned an associate of arts from Del Mar College in 1958 and a bachelor of science from the University of Corpus Christi in 1963, both in Corpus Christi. He obtained a master's degree from Sam Houston State University in 1965 and a Juris Doctor from the University of Texas at Austin in 1969. He also earned an LLM from the University of Virginia School of Law in 1986.

== Early career ==
=== Military career ===
Gammage served in the United States Army from 1959 to 1960 and the Army Reserve from 1960 to 1964. While in the army, he was stationed at Fort Benning, Georgia and in Seoul, Korea. He then served in the Navy Reserve from 1965 to 2000, where he retired as a captain

=== Educational career ===
Throughout the late 1960s and early 1970s, Gammage was employed on the faculty the University of Corpus Christi, San Jacinto College, and the South Texas College of Law. In the late 1990s and early 2000s (decade), he taught at Sam Houston State University, Texas A&M University-Corpus Christi (formerly the University of Corpus Christi), Texas State University in San Marcos, and Roman Catholic-affiliated St. Edward's University in Austin.

== Political career ==
Gammage served in the Texas House of Representatives from 1971 to 1973. Gammage was a member of the so-called "Dirty 30," a bipartisan group of legislators that pushed for reform in the 1970s in the wake of the Sharpstown scandal in which then state House Speaker Gus Mutscher of Brenham in Washington County was convicted and sentenced to five years probation for conspiring to accept a bribe. As a legislator he advocated government reform, consumer and health legislation, voting rights for eighteen-year -olds, and equal rights for women.

Gammage was a member of the Texas State Senate from 1973 to 1976, when he was elected to the 95th Congress, having unseated freshman Republican Ron Paul. After one term in Congress, he lost his seat to Paul in 1978. From 1979 to 1980, Gammage was assistant state attorney general under Attorney General Mark Wells White. In 1980, he was a special consultant to the U.S. Department of Energy under U.S. President Jimmy Carter, the last Democrat to win Texas in the Electoral College.

In 1982, Gammage was elected as a justice to the Texas Third Court of Appeals in Austin and served in that position until 1991. He was elected in 1990 to the Texas Supreme Court, on which he served from 1991 until 1995. During his time on the bench Gammage participated in nearly 250 cases. He embraced an expansive interpretation of the legal doctrines and constitutional provisions that protect individual rights and equality. Gammage garnered national attention when he resigned from the Texas Supreme Court in 1995 to draw attention to the increasing amount of influence that campaign contributors and political action committees (PACs) had on judicial elections. Working with other proponents of judicial reform, including former Texas State Supreme Court Chief Justice Thomas R. Phillips, Gammage was a key actor in bringing about caps on campaign contributions in judicial elections.

In 2006, Gammage lost the Texas gubernatorial Democratic primary election to former U.S. Representative Chris Bell of Houston. Bell was then defeated by incumbent Republican Rick Perry.

On May 27, 2008, Gammage delivered the funeral eulogy for his former "Dirty Thirty" colleague Joseph Hugh Allen, a former representative from Baytown.

In 2008, Gammage worked in the unsuccessful campaign to nominate Hillary Clinton for U.S. president, having traveled to Iowa to meet with voters. According to his wife, Lynda Gammage, he spent his last years often performing pro bono legal work for the needy.

Gammage died at the age of 74 in his Llano home of an apparent heart attack on September 10, 2012.

== Texas House Bills and House Joint Resolutions written by Gammage ==
- HB 249, Relating to the regulation of practice used in the collection of debts,
- HB 250, Relating to the awarding of attorney's fees in any civil action in which the court finds that equity would be served by the award,
- HB 251, Removing insurance companies from coverage exemption,
- HB 307, Relating to the definition of deceptive trade practices in the conduct of any trade or commerce,
- HB 592 Providing for the compensation to the county attorneys in certain counties,
- HB 711, Creating two family district courts for Harris County,
- HB 921, Relating to an accused's right to an examining trial before an indictment,
- HB 1356, Relating to the casting of contempt upon flags of the United States,
- HB 1357, Relating to the jurisdiction of the municipal courts of Texas and to the punishment for certain misdemeanor offenses,
- HB 1359, Relating to the abolition of the Parks and Wildlife Department and the transfer of the powers, duties, and functions to tow newly established agencies,
- HB 1660, Relating to the creation and jurisdiction of municipal courts in certain cities and the election of municipal judges,
- HB 1661, Creating the La Porte Utility District,
- HB 1743, Creating Sagemeadow Utility District,
- HB 1801, Relating to the registration and filing of financial statements by persons engaged in representations before the Legislature and state agencies,
- HB 1843, Relating to the pay of election judges and clerks,
- HB 1857, Relating to the assignment of certain retired district judges to sit in certain courts,
- HJR 76, Reducing the minimum service requirement for eligibility under the teacher retirement system from ten years to five years.

== Notable court opinions ==
- Colquette v. Forbes (1984)
- Kirby v. Edgewood Independent School District (1988)
- Edgewood Independent School District v. Kirby (1989)
- Valenzuela v. Aquino (1993)
- State v. Morales (1994)
- Barber v. Colorado Independent School District (1995)
- Star-Telegram, Inc. v. Doe (1995)
- Rodgers v. Bradley (1995)

Texas House of Representatives
Preceded by Arthur Vance	Member of the Texas House of Representatives from District 24-3 (Houston); 1971–1973	Succeeded by Obsolete district
Texas Senate
Preceded by Chet Brooks	Texas Senate, District 7; 1973–1976	Succeeded by Gene Jones
U.S. House of Representatives
Preceded by Ron Paul	Member of the U.S. House of Representatives from Texas's 22nd congressional district 1977-1979	Succeeded by Ron Paul
Legal offices
Preceded by C. L. Ray Jr.	Texas Supreme Court Justice, Place 8; 1991-1995	Succeeded by James A. Baker
