= Rayford =

Rayford is both a given name and surname.

== People ==
=== Given name ===
- Rayford Barnes (1920-2000), American film and TV character actor
- Rayford Cooks (born 1962), American football player
- Rayford B. High Jr., American bishop
- Rayford Logan (1897-1982), African-American historian and Pan-African activist
- Rayford Petty, American college football coach
- Rayford Price (1937-2023), American politician
- Rayford Jeffrey Ray, American bishop
- Ray Robinson (Australian cricketer) (1914-1965), Australian cricketer
- Trae Young (Rayford Trae Young, born 1998), American basketball player
- Rayford Okyere Geologist

=== Surname ===
- Alma Rayford (1903-1987), American silent film actress
- Caesar Rayford (born 1986), American football defensive lineman with the Utah Blaze of the AFL
- Floyd Rayford (born 1957), African-American retired Major League Baseball player
- Robert Rayford (1953-1969), American teenager and earliest confirmed HIV/AIDS case in North America
- Sugaray Rayford (born 1969), American singer and songwriter

== Fictional ==
- Rayford Steele, the protagonist in the Left Behind series of novels
  - Rayford "Raymie" Steele, son of Rayford and Irene Steele
- Re=L Rayford from the Japanese light novel and anime television series Akashic Records of Bastard Magic Instructor

== See also ==
- Raeford, North Carolina
- Raiford, Florida
  - Florida State Prison, called "Raiford" because its postal address is Raiford, Florida
  - "Four Walls of Raiford", a song on Legend (Lynyrd Skynyrd album)
- Dan R. McGehee (1883-1962), American representative
- Rayford Price (born 1937), American politician
- Walter R. Tucker Jr. (1924-1990), American dentist and politician
- Walter R. Tucker III (born 1957), American politician and son of Walter Jr.
