= 1964 Texas Attorney General election =

- November 3, 1964
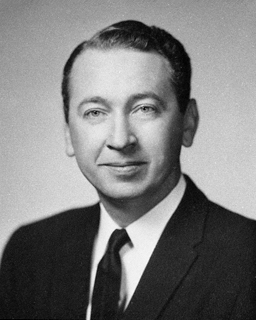

| Nominee | Waggoner Carr | John Trice |
| Party | Democratic | Republican |
| Popular vote | 1,901,038 | 642,134 |
| Percentage | 74.8% | 25.2% |
Attorney General before election
Waggoner Carr
Democratic
Elected Attorney General
Waggoner Carr
Democratic

The 1964 Texas Attorney General election took place on November 3, 1964, to elect the Texas Attorney General. Incumbent Democrat Waggoner Carr was reelected defeating Republican nominee John Trice.

== Democratic primary ==
Waggoner Carr, the incumbent attorney general, ran unopposed in the primary.

=== Results ===
Democratic primary
| Party | Candidate | Votes | % |
|---|---|---|---|
| Democratic | Waggoner Carr (incumbent) | 1,399,161 | 100.0% |
| Write-in | | 8 | 0.0% |
| Total votes | | 1,399,169 | 100.0% |

== Republican primary ==
John Trice ran unopposed in the primary.

== General election ==
=== Results ===
November 3, 1964 Texas Attorney General election
| Party | Candidate | Votes | % |
|---|---|---|---|
| Democratic | Waggoner Carr (incumbent) | 1,901,038 | 74.8% |
| Republican | John Trice | 642 134 | 25.2% |
| Total votes | | 2,543,172 | 100.00% |
| Democratic hold | | | |
