= Maurice Doke =

American football player and state legislator (1938–2018)

No. 81
- Positions: End, Guard, Linebacker

Personal information
- Born: November 18, 1938; Wichita Falls, Texas
- Died: June 5, 2018 (aged 79); Houston, Texas, U.S.

Career information
- High school: Wichita Falls (TX)
- College: Texas
- AFL draft: 1960: 1stth round

Awards and highlights
- First-team All-American (1959); 1960 Cotton Bowl Classic co-MVP; First-team All-SWC (1959); Southwest Conference Co-champion (1959)

Member of the Texas House of Representatives from the 81-2 district
- In office 8 January 1963 – 10 January 1967
- Preceded by: Jack W. Connell Jr.
- Succeeded by: Dave Allred

Personal details
- Party: Democratic

Homer Maurice Doke (November 18, 1938 – June 5, 2018) was an American football player and Texas state legislator.

== Early life ==
Doke was born in Wichita Falls, TX to Ralph Homer and Queechy Childers Doke. He went to Wichita Falls Senior High School where he was a 3rd Team 4A All-State end in 1951.

== College ==
Doke attended the University of Texas where he played end, guard and linebacker for the Texas Longhorns football team from 1957 to 1959 and studied Chemical Engineering. He started all 31 games of his varsity career from 1957-1959.

As a sophomore he helped the team to the 1958 Sugar Bowl and a final ranking of #11. Individually, he was selected to the 1957 All-Southwest Conference 2nd team as an end.

In 1958 he helped the Longhorns climb to as high as #4 in the rankings, but two mid-season upsets and a loss to #7 TCU left them unranked and out of the bowl game picture.

In his senior year, he was moved to offensive guard and he and Texas had their best seasons of his tenure. The Longhorns spent much of the season undefeated and rose to #2 in the nation on a collision course with #1 Syracuse in the Cotton Bowl, but lost a close one to TCU that knocked them to #4. They still won a share of the Southwest Conference Championship and played Syracuse in the 1960 Cotton Bowl Classic.

Doke won numerous honors that year. His teammates named him the Most Outstanding Player and gave him the George “Hook” McCullough MVP trophy. The Houston Post named him the Southwest Conference Lineman of the Year and named him the conference MVP and he was a consensus selection as first team All-Southwest Conference, this time as a guard. He was named Texas' MVP for the Cotton Bowl. He was selected by the Football Writers Association of America as a first-team player on its 1959 College Football All-America Team, received second-team honors from the Associated Press and was Texas Football's first Academic All-American. Most notably he was a finalist for the 1959 Swede Nelson Sportsmanship Award and was a National Football Foundation Scholar-Athlete.

While attending the University of Texas, Doke also served as editor-in-chief of the UT Chemical Engineering Society Magazine, Secretary of the American Institute of Chemical Engineers, was a member of the Faculty Student Cabinet, was voted outstanding ROTC cadet and was a Rhodes Scholar Nominee.

After his career at Texas was over he won 4 out 7 awards presented by the Ex-Students Association in 1960, played in the 1960 Hula Bowl and was honored on Jan 14, 1960 in Wichita Falls with Maurice Doke Day.

== Later life ==
Doke was assigned to the Denver Broncos as part of the 1960 American Football League draft, technically as a 1st Round pick, but he never signed with the team.

Instead he continued his studies at Texas, getting a masters in government while also working as an assistant coach of the Texas freshman football team and working for 4 sessions on the Texas State Legislature research staff.

In 1961 he was an aide to Jack W. Connell Jr. in the Texas state legislature as he planned to go to Harvard for a PhD. Instead he ran for office himself, defeating Connell in the 1962 Democratic primary (following a runoff), and then served two terms in the Texas House of Representatives from 1963 to 1967 representing the 81st District, place 2. In part due to his chemical engineering education, he served on the oil and gas committee. He defeated Harry Joiner in the 1964 Democratic primary for the seat. Early in his 2nd term, a question arose about his residency, and thus his eligibility, and he announced his intention to not run again in 1966 and to instead move to Austin.

He later worked in commercial real estate and banking.

Doke died from Alzheimers on June 5, 2024, at the age of 79.
