= Jim T. Lindsey =

American politician and lawyer (1926–2013)

Member of the Texas House of Representatives from the 1st district
- In office January 11, 1949 – January 8, 1957
- Preceded by: Joe Tom Kennington
- Succeeded by: Thomas H. Stilwell

Speaker of the Texas House of Representatives
- In office January 11, 1955 – January 8, 1957
- Preceded by: Reuben E. Senterfitt
- Succeeded by: Waggoner Carr

Personal details
- Born: Jim Thurston Lindsey; February 1, 1926 Sand Hill, Texas, US
- Died: April 2, 2013 (aged 87) Redwood Valley, California, US
- Party: Democratic Party
- Occupation: Politician, lawyer

Jim Thurston Lindsey Sr. (February 1, 1926 – April 2, 2013) was an American politician and lawyer. A Democrat, he was a member of the Texas House of Representatives, including a term as Speaker of the House

== Early life, military service, and education ==
Lindsey was born on February 1, 1926, on a farm in Sand Hill, Bowie County, Texas, the son of James Luke Lindsey and Bertie Lee Lindsey. In 1941, he graduated from James Bowie High School. From 1942 to fall 1945, he served in the United States Army Air Forces and fought in World War II. By 1949, he lived in Boston, moving to Texarkana by 1951.

Lindsey studied at the University of Texas at Arlington before enlisting into the military. From 1945 to 1950, he studied at Baylor University, graduating with a Bachelor of Laws and Latin honors. He studied at the University of Texas at Austin School of Law while a member of the House.

== Career ==
Lindsey was a Democrat. He was a member of the Texas House of Representatives, from January 11, 1949, to January 8, 1957, having been elected while still studying at Baylor. He represented the 1st district, specifically place number 1, from January 13, 1953. From January 11, 1955, until the end of his tenure, he was Speaker of the House; elected Speaker at age 28, he was one of the youngest to hold the office. Ideologically, he was conservative, his political career being defined by reforms.

In the House, Lindsey was chairman of the Committee on Revenue and Taxation, as well as vice-chairman of the Committee on Audits. He was a member of the Committees on Aeronautics; on Banks and Banking; on Counties; on Education; on Engrossed Bills; on Highways and Roads; on Interstate Cooperation; on the Judiciary; on Military and Veteran's Affairs; on Motor Traffic; on Municipal and Private Corporations; and on State Affairs.

After graduating from Baylor, Lindsey joined a law partnership in Texarkana. In 1956, he was president of the Yexas Good Roads Association. From 1956 to 1959, he was chairman of the Texas Democratic Executive Committee. After serving in the House, he practiced law, worked in finance, and operated a ranch.

== Personal life and death ==
Lindsey was married to Moja Yvonne Birdwell Lindsey for almost 70 years; they had five children together. He was a member of the Freemasons and the United States Junior Chamber. He later moved to Redwood Valley, California, dying there on April 2, 2013, aged 87.
