= Larry Stephens (American football) =

American football player (1938–1998)

No. 68, 79, 77
- Positions: Defensive tackle, defensive end

Personal information
- Born: September 24, 1938; Buda, Texas, U.S.
- Died: March 28, 1998 (aged 59); McMahan, Texas, U.S.
- Listed height: 6 ft 3 in (1.91 m)
- Listed weight: 250 lb (113 kg)

Career information
- High school: Angleton (Angleton, Texas)
- College: Texas
- NFL draft: 1960: 2nd round, 18th overall pick
- AFL draft: 1960: First Selectionsth overall pick

Career history
- Cleveland Browns (1960–1961); Los Angeles Rams (1962); Dallas Cowboys (1963–1967)

Awards and highlights
- Second-team All-SWC (1959)

Career NFL statistics
- Fumble recoveries: 2
- Interceptions: 1
- Sacks: 16
- Stats at Pro Football Reference

Lawrence Clifton Stephens (September 24, 1938 – March 28, 1998) was an American professional football defensive lineman in the National Football League (NFL) for the Cleveland Browns, Los Angeles Rams and Dallas Cowboys. He played college football for the Texas Longhorns.

== Early life ==
Stephens was a 1956 graduate of Angleton High School. He was named an All-state and All-American at End as a senior. He was an outstanding all-around athlete who also excelled in basketball, baseball, and track.

He was widely recruited and committed to play football at the University of Texas which was then coached by Darrell Royal. He began as an end, before being switched to tackle as a sophomore.

He was a key contributor to the Longhorn's successes in the late 1950s which included an SWC Championship and appearances in both the Sugar Bowl and Cotton Bowl Classic. In his senior year he was named to the All-Southwest Conference team. He also pitched for the Texas Longhorns baseball team.

== Professional career ==
=== Cleveland Browns ===
Stephens was selected by the Cleveland Browns in the second round (18th overall) of the 1960 NFL draft. He played for the Browns in 1960 and 1961. While with the Browns he scored his only NFL touchdown on a 38-yard interception return against the Dallas Cowboys.

On July 11, 1962, he was traded to the Los Angeles Rams along with a third round pick (#37-John Baker) and sixth round pick (#79-Terry Monaghan), in exchange for quarterback Frank Ryan and running back Tommy Wilson.

=== Los Angeles Rams ===
In 1962, he started at defensive tackle alongside NFL notables Merlin Olson, Lamar Lundy, and Deacon Jones. On September 8, 1963, he was traded to the Dallas Cowboys in exchange for a future draft choice,

=== Dallas Cowboys ===
In 1963, he played defensive end for the original "Doomsday Defense". He became a versatile starter along the four positions in the defensive line through 1966, until he was slowed by a knee injury and was replaced by Willie Townes.

In 1965, he made a field goal block to help the Cowboys set up a last minute touchdown against the San Francisco 49ers, winning the game to end a 5-game losing streak, which was key for the Cowboys to reach the 1966 Playoff Bowl.

While he was with the Cowboys, the team made the transition from mediocrity to championship contention. He also played in the 1967 NFL Championship Game (commonly known as the Ice Bowl).

He was selected by the New Orleans Saints in the 1967 NFL expansion draft, but the Cowboys sent a fourth round draft choice (#103-Dan Sartin), in order to keep him. He was released on September 4, 1968.

== Personal life ==
Stephens married Jane (Olson) Stephens and had 5 children: Mark, Susan, Jeff, Shannon, and Walter. He taught American History and coached football at Magnolia Junior High School in Magnolia, Texas in the 1980s. He worked as a special education teacher for the Lockhart Independent School District in Lockhart, Texas during the 1990s. He was an active supporter of Special Olympics.

The Pete Logan character in the 2008 film The Express: The Ernie Davis Story was based on him. He died on March 28, 1998.
