= C. L. Ray Jr. =

American judge (1931–2018)

Cread L. Ray Jr. (March 10, 1931 – December 9, 2018) was a justice of the Supreme Court of Texas from November 25, 1980 to December 31, 1990.

Born in Waskom, Texas, Ray graduated from Waskom High School in 1948, and received a BBA degree from Texas A&M University, in 1952. He then joined the United States Air Force and served in the Korean War. After the war he received a J.D. from the University of Texas School of Law in 1957.

Ray entered private practice with a firm in Harrison County, Texas. He served as a county court judge, and in the Texas House of Representatives, after which he was elected the Texas Sixth Court of Appeals in 1970, serving until his appointment to the state supreme court in 1980.

Political offices
Preceded by William Lockhart Garwood	Justice of the Texas Supreme Court; 1980–1990	Succeeded by Robert Gammage
