= 1968 Texas lieutenant gubernatorial election =

- November 5, 1968
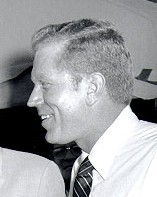

Nominee	Ben Barnes	Doug DeCluitt
Party	Democratic	Republican
Popular vote	2,040,480	793,246
Percentage	72.01%	27.99%
- County results Barnes: 50–60% 60–70% 70–80% 80–90% >90%
Lieutenant Governor before election
Preston Smith
Democratic
Elected Lieutenant Governor
Ben Barnes
Democratic

The 1968 Texas lieutenant gubernatorial election was held on November 5, 1968, in order to elect the lieutenant governor of Texas. Democratic nominee and incumbent Speaker of the Texas House of Representatives Ben Barnes defeated Republican nominee Doug DeCluitt.

== General election ==
On election day, November 5, 1968, Democratic nominee Ben Barnes won the election by a margin of 1,247,234 votes against his opponent Republican nominee Doug DeCluitt, thereby retaining Democratic control over the office of lieutenant governor. Barnes was sworn in as the 36th lieutenant governor of Texas on January 21, 1969.

=== Results ===
Texas lieutenant gubernatorial election, 1968
Party	Candidate	Votes	%
Democratic	Ben Barnes	2,040,480	72.01
Republican	Doug DeCluitt	793,246	27.99
	Scattering	27	0.00
Total votes		2,833,753	100.00
Democratic hold			
