= Jimmy Turman =

American politician and educator (1927–2019)

Member of the Texas House of Representatives from the 24th district
- In office January 11, 1955 – January 8, 1963
- Preceded by: Thomas Burr Wright
- Succeeded by: James D. Cole

Speaker of the Texas House of Representatives
- In office January 10, 1961 – January 8, 1963
- Preceded by: Waggoner Carr
- Succeeded by: Byron M. Tunnell

Personal details
- Born: James Arthur Turman; November 29, 1927 Leonard, Texas, US
- Died: February 13, 2019 (aged 91) Austin, Texas, US
- Resting place: Texas State Cemetery
- Party: Democratic
- Occupation: Politician, educator

James Arthur Turman (November 29, 1927 – February 13, 2019) was an American politician and educator. A Democrat, he was a member of the Texas House of Representatives, including a term as Speaker of the House.

Born in Leonard, Texas, Turman studied at East Texas A&M University and the University of Texas at Austin. He served in the Korean War, afterwards being elected to the Texas House. He served from 1955 to 1963, and as Speaker from 1961 until the end of his tenure. He then became an education leader of the Federal government of the United States.

== Early life and education ==
Turman was born on November 29, 1927, near Leonard, Texas, the son of a tenant farmer. He studied at East Texas A&M University, earning a Bachelor of Science and a Master of Science, in 1948 and 1949, respectively. During his House tenure, he matriculated at the University of Texas at Austin, earning a Doctor of Education and a Doctor of Psychology in 1957; he was named distinguished alumnus in 2009.

== Career ==
At age 19, Turman became a schoolteacher and principal at a school in Wolfe City, and at age 24, became principal of a school in Paris. He was also a farmer, being a member of the Texas Farm Bureau. During the Korean War, he served in the United States Navy, being discharged in 1954. After the war, he moved to Gober. From 1957 to 1960, he was an assistant professor, and assistant to the president of, Texas Woman's University.

Turman was a Democrat. He was a member of the Texas House of Representatives, from January 11, 1955, to January 8, 1963, representing the 24th district. From January 10, 1961, to January 8, 1963, he was Speaker of the House, being narrowly elected. He was the first Speaker to hold a doctorate. Ideologically, he was a moderate, with him describing himself as "fiscally conservative, socially liberal". He described himself as for states' rights.

While serving, Turman was chairman of the Committees on Education and on Municipal and Private Corporations, as well as a member of the Committees on Appropriations; on Banks and Banking; on Constitutional Amendments; on Interstate Cooperation; on Public Lands and Buildings; on Rules; on School Districts; and on State Affairs. He oversaw the passage of education reforms, as well as the state's first sales tax. He voted in favor of retaining segregation, though was noncommittal in his view on the matter. Journalist Ronnie Dugger described him as a liberal on the matter of taxation and a funder of public services.

Turman unsuccessfully ran in the Democratic primaries for the 1962 Texas lieutenant gubernatorial election. In 1963, he moved to Washington, D.C. and joined the United States Department of Education. He became associate to the United States Commissioner of Education, later becoming a commissioner of the Education Commission of the States, then a member of the J. William Fulbright Foreign Scholarship Board. Under Presidents Richard Nixon and Gerald Ford, he was director of the National Advisory Council on Extension and Continuing Education. He also helped guide school integration and resettlement efforts during the Indochina refugee crisis.

Turman was the head of two education consultation agencies in Alexandria, Virginia. He worked as the chief of staff congressman Jim Mattox, and a liaison between he and the United States House Committee on the Budget. He later joined the United States Department of Health and Human Services, working as Dallas' director of refugee resettlement. In 1986, he retired from civil service. He then became a senior research analyst to the Texas Comptroller of Public Accounts. In 1990, he founded the Chaparral Mining Corporation.

== Personal life and death ==
Turman was married to Ira Turman, who predeceased him. He then married Joanie Turman. He had a son. He lived in Briarcliff and was a friend of Willie Nelson. In 2005, Farm to Market Road 68 was given the name "Speaker Jimmy Turman Road", unanimously by the Texas Legislature. He was Baptist. He died on February 13, 2019, aged 91, in Austin, from a stroke. On February 22, his body was presented in the Texas State Capitol. He was buried on February 25, at the Texas State Cemetery.
