= 1959 All-Southwest Conference football team =

American college football all-star team

The 1959 All-Southwest Conference football team consists of American football players chosen by various organizations for All-Southwest Conference teams for the 1959 college football season. The selectors for the 1959 season included the Associated Press (AP) and the United Press (UP). Players selected as first-team players by both the AP and UP are designated in bold.

== All Southwest selections ==
=== Backs ===
- **Don Meredith**, SMU (AP-1; UPI-1)
- **Jack Spikes**, TCU (AP-1; UPI-1)
- **Jim Mooty**, Arkansas (AP-1; UPI-1)
- Rene Ramirez, Texas (AP-1)
- Jack Collins, Texas (AP-2; UPI-1)
- Charlie Milstead, Texas A&M (AP-2)
- Lance Alworth, Arkansas (AP-2)
- Glynn Gregory, SMU (AP-2)

=== Ends ===
- **Monte Lee**, Texas (AP-1; UPI-1)
- Albert Witcher, Baylor (AP-1)
- Henry Christopher, SMU (AP-2; UPI-1)
- Billy Tranum, Arkansas (AP-2)

=== Tackles ===
- **Don Floyd**, TCU (AP-1; UPI-1)
- **Bob Lilly**, TCU (AP-1; UPI-1)
- Larry Stephens, Texas (AP-2)
- Marlin Epp, Arkansas (AP-2)

=== Guards ===
- **Maurice Doke**, Texas (AP-1; UPI-1)
- **Rufus King**, Rice (AP-1; UPI-1)
- Raman Armstrong, TCU (AP-2)
- Roy Lee Rambo, TCU (AP-2)

=== Centers ===
- **Wayne Harris**, Arkansas (AP-1; UPI-1)
- Boyd King, Rice (AP-2)

== Key ==
AP = Associated Press

UPI = United Press International

Bold = Consensus first-team selection of both the AP and UP

== See also ==
- 1959 College Football All-America Team
