= 1970 Texas lieutenant gubernatorial election =

- November 3, 1970
- Turnout: 54.1% (Note: Of registered voters.)
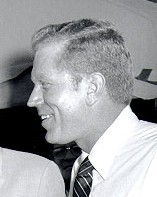

Nominee	Ben Barnes	Byron Fullerton
Party	Democratic	Republican
Popular vote	1,497,515	750,445
Percentage	66.61%	33.38%
- County results Barnes: 50–60% 60–70% 70–80% 80–90% >90%
Lieutenant Governor before election
Ben Barnes
Democratic
Elected Lieutenant Governor
Ben Barnes
Democratic

The 1970 Texas lieutenant gubernatorial election was held on November 3, 1970, in order to elect the lieutenant governor of Texas. Incumbent Democrat Ben Barnes was re-elected over Republican nominee Byron Fullerton. Barnes won the election with 66% of the vote to Fullerton's 33%, and was sworn in on January 19, 1971.

== Primaries ==
The Democratic and Republican primary elections were held on May 2, 1970. Barnes and Fullerton both ran unopposed for their respective nominations, obviating any run-off elections.

=== Results ===
Democratic primary results
Party	Candidate	Votes	%
Democratic	Ben Barnes	1,045,878	100.0
Total votes		1,045,878	100.0

Republican primary results
Party	Candidate	Votes	%
Republican	Byron Fullerton	95,842	100.0
Total votes		95,842	100.0

== General election results ==
On election day, November 3, 1970, Democratic nominee Ben Barnes won the election by a margin of 747,070 votes against Republican nominee Byron Fullerton. Barnes was sworn in for his second term on January 19, 1971.

General election results
Party	Candidate	Votes	%
Democratic	Ben Barnes	1,497,515	66.61
Republican	Byron Fullerton	750,445	33.38
	Scattering	260	0.01
Total votes		2,248,220	100.0
Democratic hold			
