= Tom Bass (politician) =

American politician (1927–2019)

Thomas Hutcheson Bass (January 11, 1927 – March 3, 2019) was a Texas politician, professor, and third-generation Houstonian. In addition to his many years teaching at the high school and university level, he served in the House of Representatives and in Harris County government.

He was one of the founding members of the "Dirty Thirty" and served in the Texas House of Representatives from 1963 until his election as Harris County Commissioner in 1974. In 1984, as a result of his flood control efforts while county commissioner, Tom Bass Regional Park was dedicated in his name. He left the Commissioner's Court in 1985 and helped in the successful adoption of the first 9-1-1 District in Texas; in 2008, the Greater Harris County 9-1-1 building was opened and named the Tom Bass Building in his honor.

His remains are interred at Texas State Cemetery in Austin.

== Early life and education ==
Bass was born and reared in Houston, Texas.

Bass attended Holy Rosary School in what is now Midtown, and graduated from St. Thomas High School, where he would later teach, in 1944. He graduated from the University of Texas in three years, completing his bachelor's degree in 1950. Bass married his wife, Mary Ann King, in 1950, and together they reared ten children. Following graduation, he joined the U.S. Army and served on active duty and in the Army Reserve for 36 years, retiring as a colonel in 1980. Following active duty, Bass earned a Master of Arts from the University of Texas in 1950 and a Master of Education from the University of Houston in 1958.

== Political career ==
Bass’ political career began in 1962, when he ran for a newly created state representative seat. His decision to seek election was spawned out of President John F. Kennedy's successful presidential campaign. Kennedy's election broke a long-standing barrier for Catholics seeking political office; Bass believed that if Kennedy could win an election as a Catholic, so could he.

=== House of Representatives and the "Dirty Thirty" ===
Bass served in the Texas House of Representatives for 10 years, serving as a committee chairman for three sessions and the Harris County Delegation Chairman for two sessions. As a member of the "Dirty Thirty" during the Sharpstown Scandal, Bass worked on legislation for reform laws to prevent government wrongdoing. As a result of his stance against House Speaker Gus Mutscher, Bass felt that he had little chance for being re-elected as a state representative. Instead, he ran successfully against incumbent Kyle Chapman, for the position of Harris County Commissioner for Precinct 1.

=== Harris County Commissioner ===
As county commissioner from 1973 to 1985, Bass worked hard for strong financial disclosure and ethics rules for all county officials and a redistricting of the commissioner precincts that allowed the first minority to be elected as a Harris County Commissioner. Bass "saw that the county's elected leaders increasingly failed to resemble the demographics of the rapidly growing, diverse region." Rather than run for a fourth term as county commissioner, Bass stepped down and El Franco Lee was ultimately elected as Harris County's first minority commissioner. Lee held the office for more than 30 years, until his death in 2016. Bass subsequently ran, unsuccessfully, for the U.S. Congress.

=== 9-1-1 and other contributions ===
One of Bass' most lasting achievements was the acquisition of 635 acres of riparian corridor along Clear Creek, which forms the southern boundary of Harris County. By conserving this greenbelt, Bass prevented the commercial development of this flood-prone area. In 1984, the park was named Tom Bass Regional Park. Following his time in office, Bass helped to establish the Greater Harris County 9-1-1 Emergency Network in 1983, and continued to serve as the head of its board of managers. The 9-1-1 Headquarters Building was renamed the Tom Bass Building in 2008 to honor Bass’ contributions.

Bass served on the board of the Visiting Nurses Association, represented Harris County at the Texas Silver Haired Legislature, and volunteered at Villa de Mantel.

== Teaching ==
Bass spent much of his life as a teacher. He taught in the Houston Independent School District for eight years, and in his later life served as an adjunct professor at the University of Houston, University of St. Thomas, and Texas Southern University. He was professor emeritus of the department of political science at University of St. Thomas.
