= James A. Baker (justice) =

American judge (1931–2008)

Justice of the Texas Supreme Court
- In office September 1, 1995 – August 31, 2002
- Appointed by: George W. Bush
- Preceded by: Robert Gammage
- Succeeded by: Michael H. Schneider

Personal details
- Born: March 30, 1931 Evansville, Indiana, U.S.
- Died: June 22, 2008 (aged 77) Dallas, Texas, U.S.
- Education: Southern Methodist University (BBA, LLB)

James A. Baker (March 30, 1931 – June 22, 2008) was a justice of the Texas Supreme Court from September 1, 1995, to August 31, 2002.

He was born in Evansville, Indiana, but moved to Dallas, Texas, where he graduated from Highland Park High School. After graduating from Southern Methodist University with a Bachelor of Business Administration degree in 1953, he served in the U.S. Army for two years. He then returned to SMU and earned a Bachelor of Laws degree in 1958.

He practiced civil litigation law until 1986, when he became a judge on the Fifth Circuit Court of Appeals, where he served for nine years. Texas Governor George W. Bush appointed him to the Texas Supreme Court. Baker retired from the court in 2002 and returned to private practice, joining the law firm Hughes & Luce (now K&L Gates), with offices in Austin and Dallas.
