= 1966 United States Senate election in Texas =

- November 8, 1966
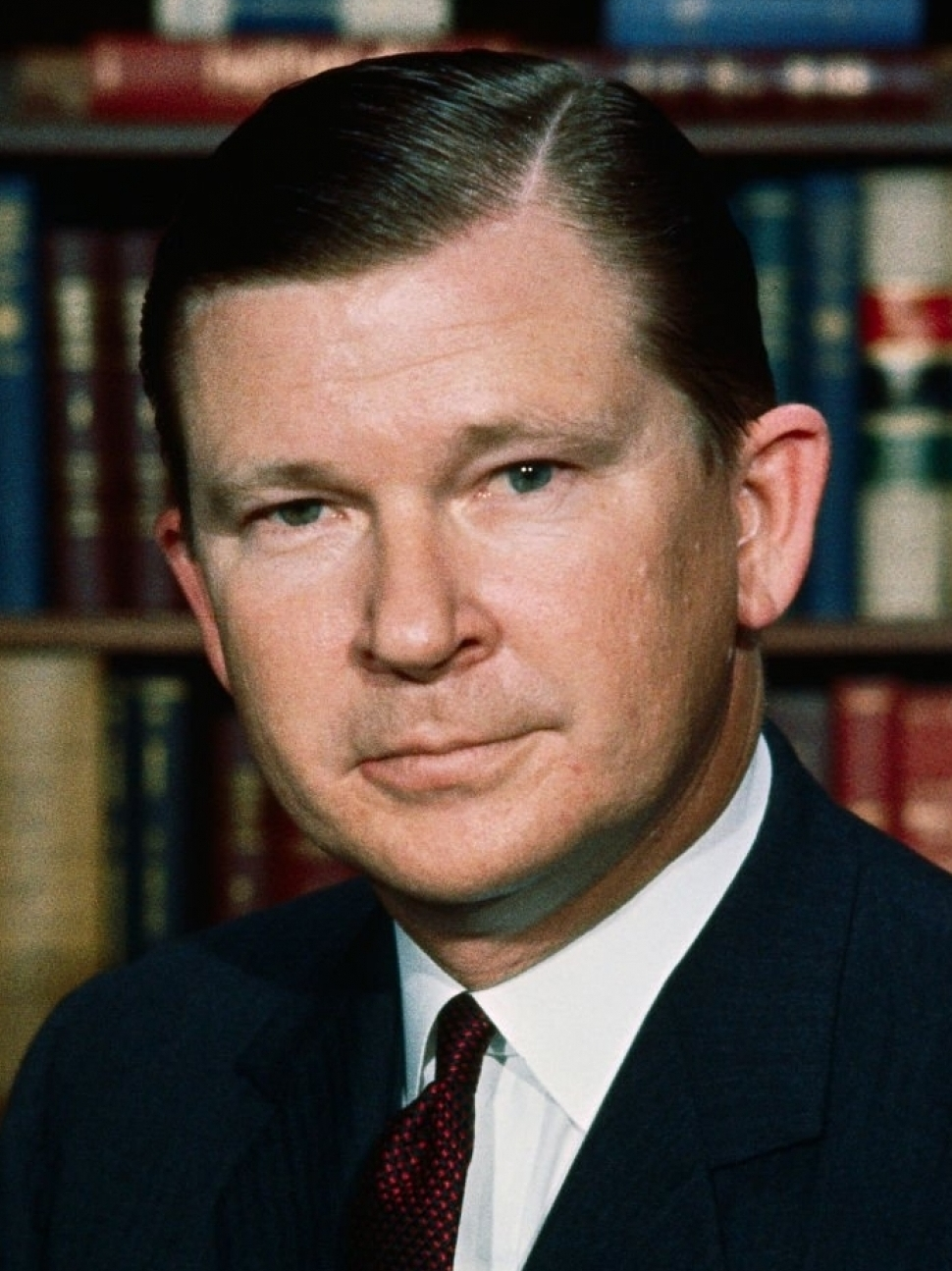

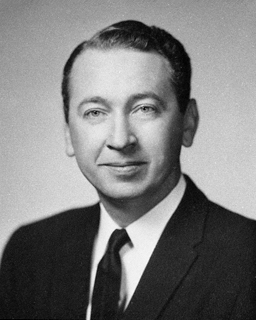
Nominee	John Tower	Waggoner Carr
Party	Republican	Democratic
Popular vote	842,501	643,855
Percentage	56.42%	43.12%
- County results Tower: 50–60% 60–70% 70–80% Carr: 50–60% 60–70% 70–80% 80–90% >90% Tie 40–50%
U.S. senator before election
John Tower
Republican
Elected U.S. Senator
John Tower
Republican

The 1966 United States Senate election in Texas was held on November 8, 1966. Incumbent Republican U.S. Senator John Tower was re-elected to a second term in office over Democratic Attorney General of Texas Waggoner Carr. Tower became the first Republican ever reelected to the Senate from Texas or any former Confederate state.

== Democratic primary ==
=== Candidates ===
- Waggoner Carr, Attorney General of Texas
- John R. Willoughby, resident of Houston

=== Results ===
1966 Democratic U.S. Senate primary
Party	Candidate	Votes	%
Democratic	Waggoner Carr	899,523	79.88%
Democratic	John R. Willoughby	226,598	20.12%
Total votes		1,126,121	100.00%

== General election ==
=== Candidates ===
- John G. Tower, incumbent U.S. Senator since 1961
- Waggoner Carr, Attorney General of Texas and Democratic challenger

== Results ==
1966 United States Senate election in Texas
Party	Candidate	Votes	%
Republican	John Tower (Incumbent)	841,501	56.39%
Democratic	Waggoner Carr	643,855	43.15%
Constitution	James Baker Holland	6,778	0.45%
Write-in		45	0.00%
Majority		197,646	13.24%
Turnout		1,492,179	
Republican hold			
