= John Ben Shepperd =

American politician (1915–1990)

40th Attorney General of Texas
- In office January 1, 1953 – January 1, 1957
- Governor: Allan Shivers
- Preceded by: Price Daniel
- Succeeded by: Will Reid Wilson, Sr.

Secretary of State of Texas
- In office February 9, 1950 – April 30, 1952
- Preceded by: Ben Ramsey
- Succeeded by: Jack Ross

Personal details
- Born: October 19, 1915 Gladewater, Texas
- Died: March 8, 1990 (aged 74) Gladewater, Texas
- Party: Democratic

Military service
- Allegiance: United States
- Branch/service: United States Army
- Years of service: 1943–1945
- Battles/wars: World War II

John Ben Shepperd (October 19, 1915 – March 8, 1990) was an American lawyer, businessman, and politician who served as the secretary of state (1950–1952) and attorney general (1953–1957) for the U.S. state of Texas.

== Early life and education ==
John Ben Shepperd was born in Gladewater, Texas to Alfred Fulton Shepperd and Berthal (Phillips) Shepperd. He came from a political family. His father served as a county commissioner in Gregg County, Texas. His grandfather, Ben Phillips, served in the Texas House of Representatives in the 1880s.

He attended the University of Texas at Austin, graduating in 1938 with his undergraduate degree, and in 1941 with an L.L.B.

While attending the University of Austin, he met fellow student Mamie (Steiber) Shepperd of Yorktown, Texas. They were married in 1938 and had two sons, Johnny and Al, and twin daughters, Marianne (Morse) and Suzanne (McIntosh).

== Political career ==
After a short period in private practice and two years in the military, Shepperd was elected to the Gregg County Commissioners Court in 1946 at the age of 30.

In 1950, he was appointed Texas Secretary of State by then-Governor, Allan Shivers.

In 1952 he was elected Texas Attorney General, a position to which he was re-elected in 1954.

He was elected president of the National Association of Attorneys General in 1956.

=== Brown v. Board of Education (1954) ===
Following the Brown v. Board decision, the U.S. Supreme Court asked the Attorneys General of all states to submit their plans for desegregation to the Court. Shepperd presented the State of Texas plan before the Court on behalf of the State of Texas. In discussing his arguments before the Court, Shepperd stated "The Supreme Court cannot be the master school board for the nation." He further stated "It is unrealistic to think that Edwards County, with one school-aged Negro, and Marion County, with its sixty percent Negro school population, may have their different problems solved from Washington or even Austin."

=== State of Texas v. NAACP (1956) ===
On August 30, 1956, three black students attempted to enroll at segregated Mansfield High School following a federal court order mandating integration of Mansfield public schools in a lawsuit brought by the NAACP. The incident gained national attention and infuriated Governor Allan Shivers, who referred to the NAACP as "paid agitators", and sought to curb the group's power in Texas, using the office of the Texas Attorney General. On September 13, 1956, just two weeks after the Mansfield incident, John Ben Shepperd brought suit against the Texas Chapter of the National Association for the Advancement of Colored People seeking to investigate and examine files, records and accounts of the NAACP branches in Houston and Dallas. On September 21, 1956, the State of Texas requested a temporary restraining order to force the NAACP to halt their activities, claiming that the NAACP had violated their state charter, which permitted only non-profit, charitable, and educational activities. The three main charges were: 1) practicing law without a license and barratry (the offense of frequently instigating lawsuits), 2) involvement in political activities by lobbying and supporting partisan candidates, and 3) making pecuniary profit. The request was granted and later became permanent, resulting in the NAACP being unable to operate in Texas well into the 1960s.

=== Investigation of corruption in Duval County ===
Shepperd spearheaded an investigation of longstanding corruption in Duval County, the political machine province of George Parr (also known as "The Duke of Duval"), located in the barren dusty area east of Laredo in south Texas. Shepperd's work led to some 300 indictments of county and school officials.

== Post-political career and legacy ==
After his tenure as attorney general, Shepperd moved to Odessa, where he was active not only in law but also in insurance, banking, petrochemicals, public relations, and historical preservation. He was an advocate for the creation of a university in the Permian Basin which eventually opened in 1973 as the University of Texas Permian Basin. He was a political adviser and personal friend of U.S. president Lyndon B. Johnson. In the middle 1960s, Shepperd was named trustee for the acquisition of land for the creation of Lyndon B. Johnson State Park and Historic Site along the Pedernales River in Gillespie County in the Texas Hill Country. From 1963-1967, Shepperd headed the renamed Texas Historical Commission and supported the placement of more markers along highways to promote historical preservation. He served on the Texas State Library and Archives Commission. He pushed for the establishment in the late 1960s of the University of Texas of the Permian Basin. In 1995 the Texas Legislature created the John Ben Shepperd Leadership Institute at the University of Texas Permian Basin which assists students in developing the techniques to become effective leaders.

As Attorney General, he led multiple investigations of alleged communist infiltration of trade unions attempting to organize themselves in Texas. Shepperd exposed a scheme to defraud Texas of tobacco taxes. He also defended Texas from questions raised by other states regarding the Submerged Lands Act of 1953 (43 U.S.C. § 1301), a federal law that allocated revenues from the tidelands to Texas. In 1956, Shepperd was elected by his forty-seven peers as president of the National Association of Attorneys General.

He was also involved in the planning and expansion of the Presidential Museum and Leadership Library, an institution on the UTPB campus dedicated to the office of the presidency. The "Library of Presidents" at the museum is named in Shepperd's honor. In 1984, Shepperd was named “Texan of the Year” by the state Chamber of Commerce, and three years later, the West Texas Chamber named him “Outstanding West Texan”. The saying "Freedom is not Free" is attributed to him.

Party political offices
Preceded by Price Daniel	Democratic nominee for Texas Attorney General; 1952, 1954	Succeeded by Will Wilson
Preceded by Nat Friedman	Republican nominee for Texas Attorney General; 1952	Vacant Title next held by Leo N. Duran
