= Texas Department of State Health Services =

State agency in Texas, United States

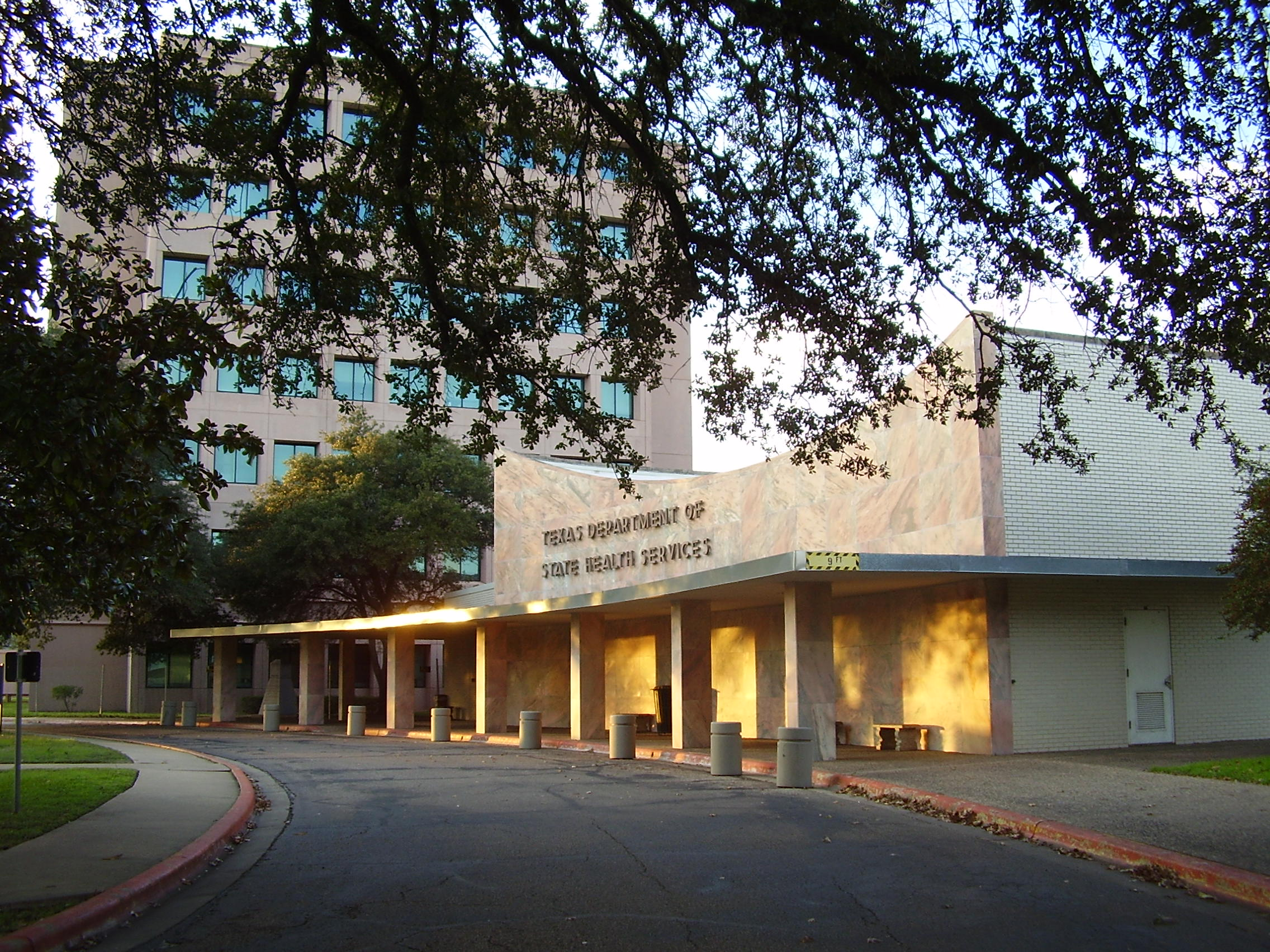
- DSHS Headquarters in Austin, Texas

Agency overview
- Formed: 2003
- Preceding agencies: Texas Department of Health; Texas Department of Mental Health and Mental Retardation; Texas Health Care Information Council; Texas Commission on Alcohol and Drug Abuse
- Jurisdiction: Texas
- Headquarters: Austin, Texas
- Agency executives: Imelda Garcia, Interim Comissioner; Rachel Hendrickson, Head of Staff; Kim White, Senior Advisor
- Parent agency: Texas Health and Human Services Commission

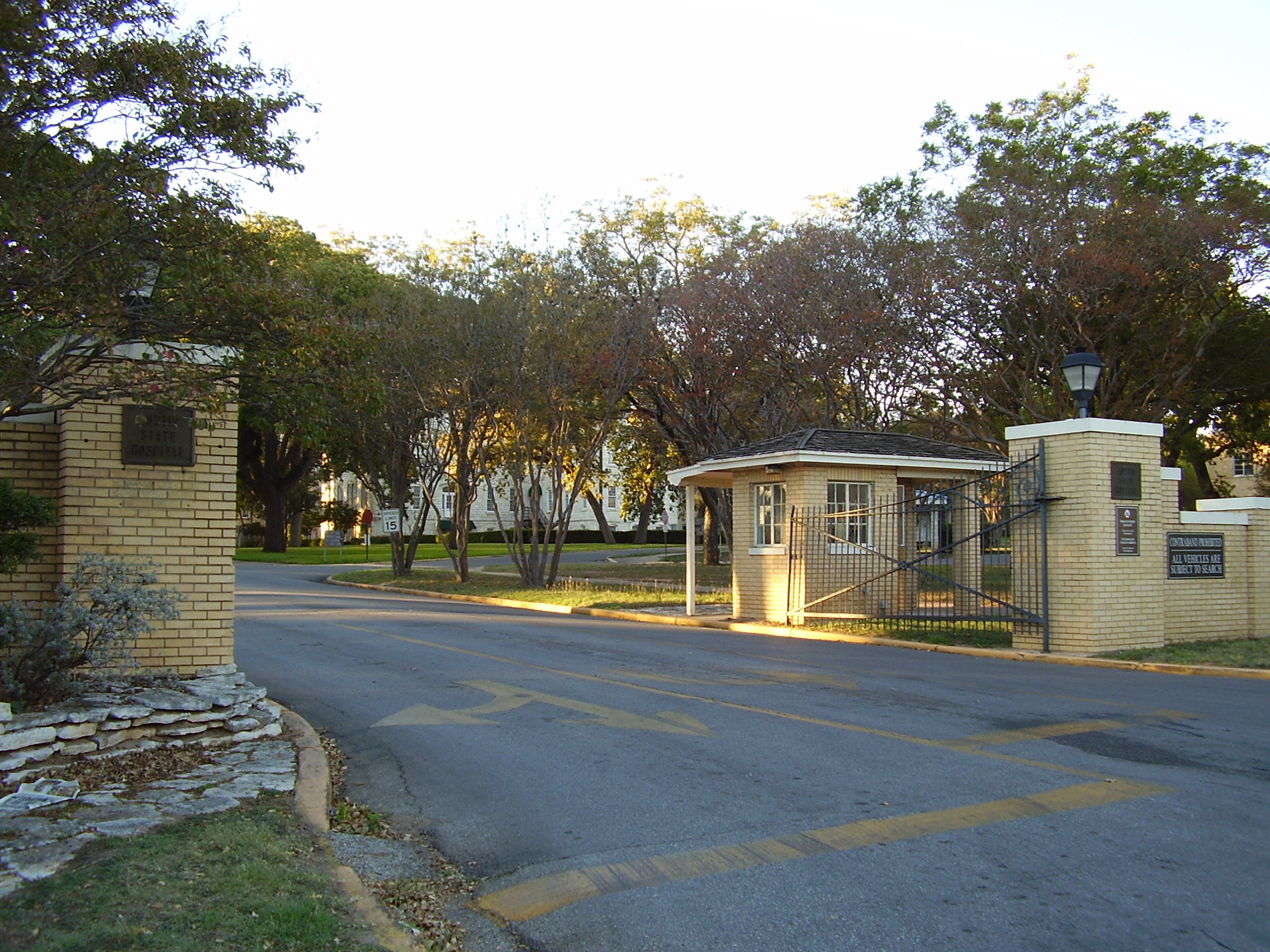
Austin State Hospital

Texas Department of State Health Services is a state agency of Texas. The department was created by House Bill 2292 of the 78th Texas Legislature in 2003 through the merging of four state agencies: the Texas Department of Health, Texas Department of Mental Health and Mental Retardation, Texas Health Care Information Council, and Texas Commission on Alcohol and Drug Abuse. The department provides state-operated health care services, including hospitals, health centers, and health agencies. The agency is headquartered at the Central Campus at 1100 West 49th Street in Austin. The DSHS Council governs the department.

The agency's Mental Health and Substance Abuse Division, along with Public Policy Research Institute at Texas A&M University coordinate the Texas School Survey, a program consisting of two surveys on drug and alcohol abuse, an annual one done at the local school-district level and a biennial statewide survey. The statewide survey, called the Texas School Survey of Substance Use, is the largest survey of its kind to be conducted in the United States and administered to over 100,000 public school students between grades 7–12.

== Leadership ==
Dr. Jennifer Shuford is the Commissioner of the Texas Department of State Health Services. She was appointed to this position in December 2022.

== Geographic structure ==
The agency provides an array of public health services and oversight across the state through eight regional offices.

- Region 1 - Lubbock
- Region 2/3 - Arlington
- Region 4/5 North - Tyler
- Region 6/5 South - Houston
- Region 7 - Temple
- Region 8 - San Antonio
- Region 9/10 - El Paso
- Region 11 - Harlingen
