= Rayford Price =

American politician (1937–2023)

Speaker of the Texas House of Representatives
- In office March 28, 1972 – January 9, 1973
- Preceded by: Gus Franklin Mutscher
- Succeeded by: Price Daniel Jr.

Member of the Texas House of Representatives
- In office January 10, 1961 – January 9, 1973

Personal details
- Born: William Rayford Price; February 9, 1937 Jacksonville, Texas, U.S.
- Died: February 21, 2023 (aged 86)
- Party: Democratic
- Profession: Lawyer

William Rayford Price (February 9, 1937 – February 21, 2023) was an American politician. He served as a Democratic member in the Texas House of Representatives from 1961 to 1973. From 1972 to 1973, he served as Speaker of the Texas House of Representatives.

Price died on February 21, 2023, at the age of 86.
