= Dave Allred =

American politician (1933–1996)

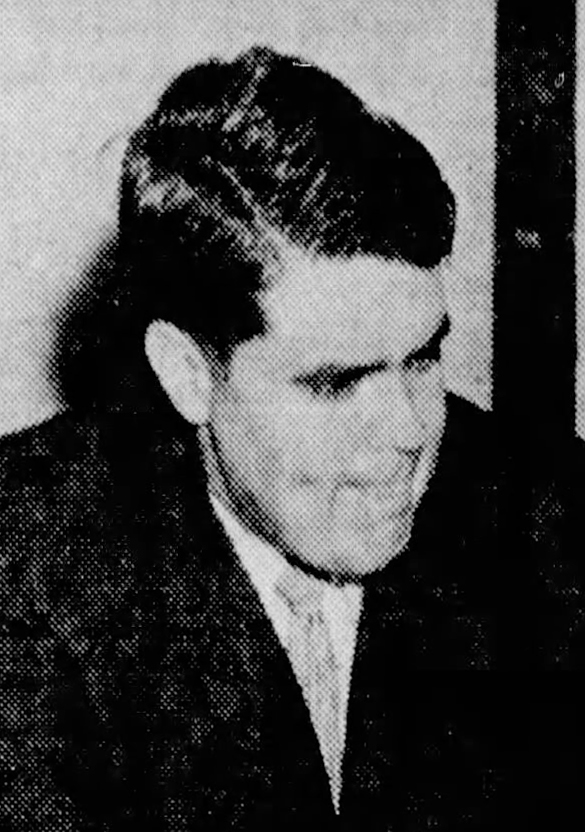
- Allred in 1958

Member of the Texas House of Representatives
- In office January 10, 1967 – January 13, 1981
- Constituency: 52nd district (1973–1981); 60-2 district (1969–1973); 85-2 district (1967–1969)

Personal details
- Born: William David Allred; November 27, 1933 Austin, Texas, U.S.
- Died: September 8, 1996 (aged 62)
- Party: Democratic
- Parent: James V. Allred (father)
- Education: Texas Christian University (BA); Columbia University Graduate School of Journalism (MS)

William David Allred (November 27, 1933 – September 8, 1996) was an American politician. A member of the Democratic Party, he served in the Texas House of Representatives from 1967 to 1981.

== Life and career ==
=== Early life and career (1933–1966) ===
William David Allred was born on November 27, 1933, in Austin, Texas, to James V. Allred and Joe Betsy Miller. James was a federal judge and served as the governor of Texas from 1935 to 1939, and Miller was a music teacher at the City View Independent School District from around 1960 until her retirement in 1971. Dave graduated from W. B. Ray High School and received a Bachelor of Arts in journalism from the Texas Christian University. While enrolled, he completed the Reserve Officers' Training Corps and joined the United States Army, being commissioned as a lieutenant. Allred also holds a Master of Science in journalism from the Columbia University Graduate School of Journalism.

Allred's first job for newspaper companies during a summer vacation from university in 1952. He worked for the Corpus Christi Times and the Fort Worth Star-Telegram. Circa July 1957, he began employment at the Associated Press in Montgomery, Alabama. In October 1958, he became an aide to Ralph Yarborough, then a United States Senator from Texas. Upon the death of his father in 1959, Allred moved back to Texas and worked for the newspaper at Wichita Falls. In 1966, he was a reporter for the Wichita Falls Times, and when he resided in Corpus Christi from 1950 to 1961, he was a reporter for the Corpus Christi Caller-Times.

=== Texas House of Representatives (1967–1981) ===
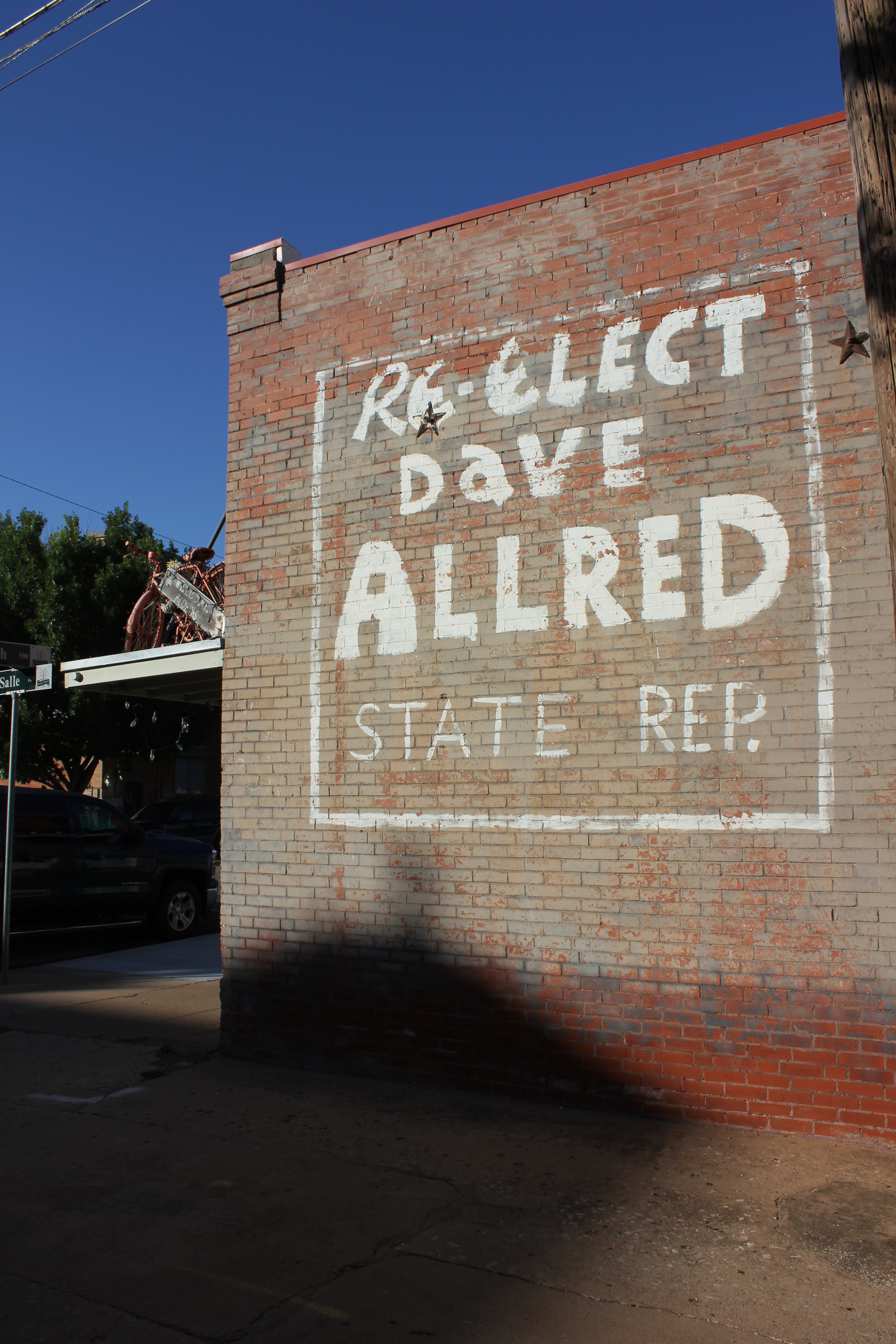
Political advertisement for Allred on the side of the World's littlest skyscraper.

In March 1965, representative Maurice Doke, representing position 2 of the House's 81st district, announced that he would not seek another term in the Texas House of Representatives. On January 1, 1966, Allred announced his campaign for the Texas House of Representatives in order "to work to help Wichita County continue its progress," seeking the Democratic Party's nomination. Originally running for Doke's 81st district seat, redistricting was soon held and Allred instead ran for the 85th district. His opponent in the primary election was judge Titus Mitchell. When the election was held in May, Allred defeated Mitchell; in the near-complete returns, Allred received 5,375 votes compared to Mitchell's 4,214. During his campaign for state representative, Allred served two weeks at Fort Gordon in Georgia in July. He was endorsed by the Wichita Falls Times roughly a month before the general election, which he ended up winning without opposition. Allred was sworn in on January 10, 1967, alongside the rest of the 60th Texas Legislature.

1966 Texas's 85th House of Representatives district Democratic primary election, Position 2
Party	Candidate	Votes	%
Democratic	Dave Allred	5,547	56.08%
Democratic	Titus T. Mitchell	4,344	43.92%
Total votes		9,891	100.00%

Upon his inauguration, Allred was assigned to committees on appropriations, conservation and reclamation, education, mental health and retardation, school districts, and state parks. He was later assigned to an appropriations subcommittee on agriculture. In February 1967, Allred introduced a resolution honoring the recently-deceased judge Irving Leslie Humphrey. The bill was unanimously approved by the Texas Legislature. A month later, he proposed a bill that would allow police officers to investigate traffic collisions on public parking lots; at the time, officers were barred from investigating collisions on private property. Shortly after introducing the collision bill, he brought forward another bill that would permit officers from arresting those who perform illegal street racing on parking lots. In April, the collision bill was considered by the House Judiciary Committee and sent to a subcommittee to create an amendment to the bill that would include parking lots at restaurants. In April 1967, a proposal by Allred and fellow legislator Charles Finnell that would allow counties to pay for group life insurance for officials and employees. It was endorsed by the West Texas County Judges and Commissioners Association.

In May 1967, Allred sent membership certificates for the fictitious "Texas Association of Windmill Tilters" to various House members who fight for legislation that does not pass. A bill introduced by Allred—which allowed Texas to sell excess property to the Texas Partners of the Alliance, an organization that sends aid for underdeveloped areas in Peru—was passed by the House on May 5. An amendment, introduced to another amendment from representative Ralph Wayne, that prohibits public business from taking place at buildings close to the public, was also approved.

=== Later life (1981–1996) ===
In February 1981, Allred was honored by the 67th Texas Legislature "for his many important contributions to the people of Texas as a member of the Texas House of Representatives and extend best wishes to him for future success and happiness."
