= Murray Watson Jr. =

American politician

Member of the Texas House of Representatives
- In office January 8, 1957 – January 8, 1963

Member of the Texas State Senate
- In office January 8, 1963 – January 9, 1973

Personal details
- Born: May 14, 1932 Waco, Texas, U.S.
- Died: July 24, 2018 (aged 86) Waco, Texas, U.S.
- Party: Democratic
- Spouse: Greta Candace Warren
- Profession: lawyer

Murray Watson Jr. (May 14, 1932 – July 24, 2018) was an American politician. He served as a Democratic member in the Texas House of Representatives from 1957 to 1963 and in the State Senate from 1963 to 1973. As a senator, he introduced legislation that led to the creation of the Texas State Technical College.
