= Will Wilson (Texas politician) =

American judge (1912–2005)

Will Reid Wilson, Sr.
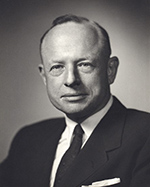

41st Attorney General of Texas
- In office 1957–1963
- Governor: Allan Shivers; Price Daniel
- Preceded by: John Ben Shepperd
- Succeeded by: Waggoner Carr

Associate Justice of the Supreme Court of Texas
- In office January 2, 1951 – June 1, 1956
- Preceded by: William Taylor
- Succeeded by: Abner McCall

Personal details
- Born: July 29, 1912 Dallas, Texas, U.S.
- Died: December 14, 2005 (aged 93) Austin, Texas, U.S.
- Resting place: Texas State Cemetery
- Party: Democratic
- Spouse: Marjorie Wilson (m. 1948; died 1984)
- Children: Two
- Education: University of Oklahoma; Southern Methodist University

Military service
- Allegiance: United States
- Branch/service: United States Army
- Rank: Major
- Battles/wars: World War II

Will Reid Wilson Sr. (July 29, 1912 – December 14, 2005), was an American politician and lawyer who served as attorney general of Texas from 1957 to 1963.

== Texas legal career ==
Wilson was a senior partner in a Dallas law firm and also served as a Texas state Supreme Court justice, and Texas attorney general.

He was a member of Democrats for Nixon in the 1968 general election.

== U.S. Department of Justice ==
He was head of the Criminal Justice Division of the U.S. Department of Justice in the Nixon administration. Wilson was appointed by Attorney General John Mitchell in 1970 to supervise the Internal Revenue Service investigation into the tax returns of Alabama Gov. George Wallace, the governor's brother, Gerald Wallace, and financial supporters who had done business with the state of Alabama. Dubbed the Alabama Project by Mitchell, the oversight was a result of President Richard Nixon's keen interest in pressing for eventual indictment of George Wallace prior to the 1972 presidential election. (Wilson in 1970 had provided U.S. Rep. Gerald Ford with derogatory information about Supreme Court Justice William O. Douglas in an effort to impeach or otherwise force Douglas to retire; Nixon had suggested to Wilson that he might be nominated to the court.) Shortly after Wallace decided to drop a third-party bid for president and focus on the Democratic nomination, the Nixon administration decided not to pursue the criminal case.

Wilson was forced out of the Nixon administration after he became embroiled in a Texas stock scandal.

Party political offices
| Preceded by John Ben Shepperd | Democratic nominee for Texas Attorney General; 1956, 1958, 1960 | Succeeded by Waggoner Carr |
