= Texas Commission on Alcohol and Drug Abuse =

The Texas Commission on Alcohol and Drug Abuse (TCADA) was a state agency of Texas, headquartered in Austin. TCADA replaced the previous agency, the Texas Commission on Alcoholism (TCA) and was established by Senate Bill 601 during the 69th Legislature. The agency made efforts to prevent abuse of alcohol and recreational drugs among Texas residents.

The passage of House Bill 2292 of the 78th Texas Legislature in 2003 merged four state agencies, including TCADA, into the Texas Department of State Health Services.
