= Jack W. Connell Jr. =

American politician (1937–2019)

Member of the Texas House of Representatives
- In office January 13, 1959 – January 8, 1963

Personal details
- Born: October 21, 1937 Wichita County, Texas, U.S.
- Died: January 29, 2019 (aged 81) Burkburnett, Texas
- Party: Democratic

Jack Willard Connell Jr. (October 21, 1937 – January 29, 2019) was an American politician who served as a Democratic member of the Texas House of Representatives from 1959 to 1963. He was elected at the age of 21, having reached the minimum age of candidacy two weeks before the election. He was sentenced to two years in prison along with ten years of probation in 2008 for a drunk driving crash on Texas State Highway 240 in 2006 that killed a married couple. He died ten years later in Burkburnett, aged 81.
