= Neil Caldwell (politician) =

American politician

Member of the Texas House of Representatives
- In office 1960–1977

Personal details
- Born: November 13, 1929 Gulf, Matagorda County, Texas, U.S.
- Died: February 6, 2018 (aged 88)
- Party: Democratic
- Education: University of Texas
- Profession: lawyer

V. Neil Caldwell (November 13, 1929 – February 6, 2018) was an American politician. He served as a Democratic member in the Texas House of Representatives from 1960 to 1977. From 1987-1988, he was the State Artist of Texas. Caldwell also served as a judge on the 23rd Judicial District of Texas.
