= Ben Barnes (Texas politician) =

American politician (born 1938)

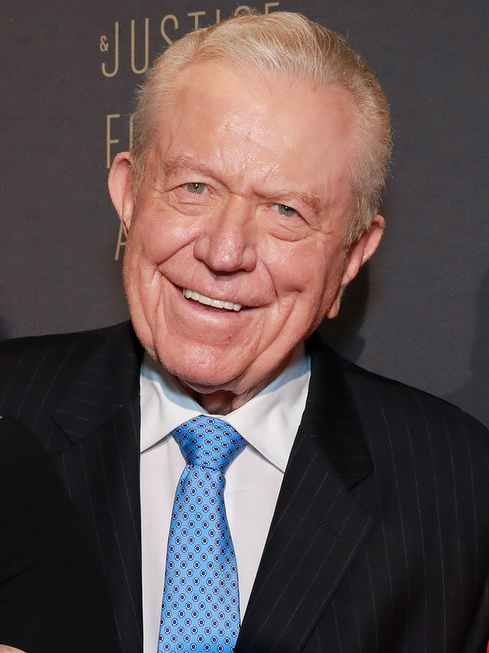
- Barnes in 2019

36th Lieutenant Governor of Texas
- In office January 21, 1969 – January 16, 1973
- Governor: Preston Smith
- Preceded by: Preston Smith
- Succeeded by: William P. Hobby Jr.

Speaker of the Texas House of Representatives
- In office January 12, 1965 – January 14, 1969
- Preceded by: Byron M. Tunnell
- Succeeded by: Gus F. Mutscher

Member of the Texas House of Representatives from the 64th district
- In office January 8, 1963 – January 14, 1969
- Preceded by: O.H. Schram
- Succeeded by: Lynn Nabers

Member of the Texas House of Representatives from the 73rd district
- In office January 10, 1961 – January 8, 1963
- Preceded by: Ben Sudderth
- Succeeded by: Richard C. Slack

Personal details
- Born: Benny Frank Barnes; April 17, 1938 (age 88) Gorman, Texas, U.S.
- Party: Democratic
- Spouses: Martha Morgan (m. 1957, divorced) Nancy DeGraffenried (divorced) Melanie Harper (m. 1989, divorced) Liz McDermott (m. 2019)
- Children: 4 (2 adopted)
- Education: University of Texas at Austin (BA)
- Profession: Real estate investor, politician, crisis manager

Benny Frank Barnes (born April 17, 1938) is an American real estate magnate, politician, and crisis manager who served as the speaker of the Texas House of Representatives from 1965 to 1969 and as the 36th lieutenant governor of Texas from 1969 to 1973. He was a vice-chair and top fundraiser of John Kerry's presidential campaign. Barnes was also one of only eight persons who raised over $500,000 for Kerry.

== Early life and education ==
Barnes was born on April 17, 1938, in Gorman in Eastland County, Texas, to peanut farmer B.F. Barnes and Ina B. Carrigan. He was raised with a younger brother, Rick. Barnes' family owned a peanut farm in Comanche County, in central Texas. They cultivated about 40 acres, growing peanuts and corn and raising hogs and chickens. The family was poor, having no working electricity until 1946, when government agents brought electricity to Texas farms as a result of President Franklin D. Roosevelt's Rural Electrification Administration.

Barnes graduated from De Leon High School in 1956. After high school, Barnes enrolled for one semester at Texas Christian University in Fort Worth, followed by a semester at Tarleton College in Stephenville, Texas. During that spring, he married his high school sweetheart, Martha Morgan. He then spent the following summer in Climax, Colorado, working at the molybdenum mine there. In 1957, at the age of 20, Barnes began studying at the University of Texas at Austin, where he was on the Dean's List for the Business School. Barnes took several jobs to pay his way through college, including a door-to-door job selling Electrolux vacuum cleaners. He graduated with a Bachelor of Arts in business.

== Career ==
=== Politics ===
==== Texas House ====
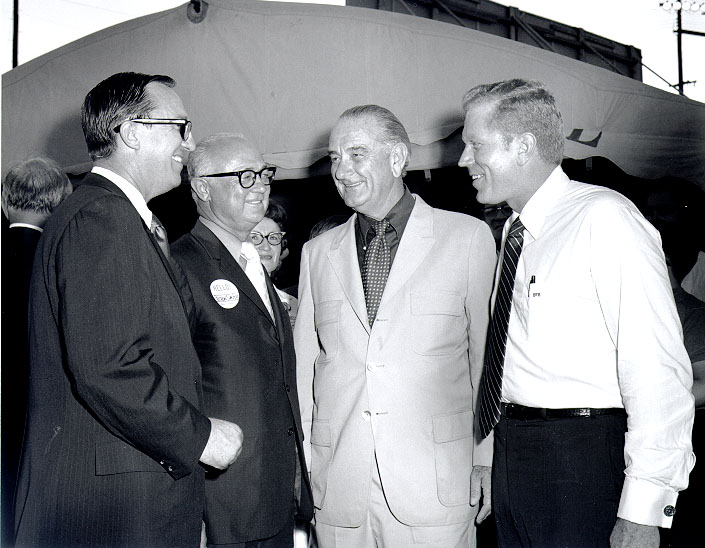
Ben Barnes (on right) with House Speaker Gus F. Mutscher, Governor Preston Smith and former president Lyndon B. Johnson in Brenham, August 17, 1970.

While a student at the University of Texas, Barnes worked at the Texas State Health Department. After discovering some financial irregularities that led to the indictment of the state health commissioner, Barnes became interested in politics. At the age of 21, Barnes went back to his home area of the state and ran for state representative, pulling off an upset victory. Advancing quickly through the Texas legislature, by 1963, Barnes was chairman of the powerful Rules Committee. In 1965, the Texas Junior Chamber of Commerce named Barnes as one of "Five Outstanding Young Texans" and the U.S. Chamber of Commerce recognized Barnes as one of the "Ten Outstanding Young Men in America" in 1970.

==== Speaker of the Texas House ====
In the lead up to 1965, Barnes began accumulating pledges of support from colleagues to succeed Byron Tunnell if the Speaker decided not to seek a third term in 1967. He didn't have to wait that long. Just before the 1965 session, a vacancy occurred on the Railroad Commission and John Connally came up with the idea of appointing Byron Tunnell, who was only a lukewarm supporter of Connally's activist legislative program, to fill the seat. Barnes had advance notice of the maneuver, so when Connally announced Tunnell's appointment, Barnes had already set up a war room in the Driskill Hotel. He started calling members to make good the pledges he had collected.

With the governor and the business lobby and all but a handful of House members behind him, Barnes was an instant powerhouse. The press latched on to the story of the young man. The headlines tell the tale: “Ben Barnes—Man Going Places,” “Boy Wonder of Texas Politics,” “Big Crowd Hears LBJ Predict White House for Ben Barnes.”

During his speakership, Barnes placed a high priority on the state's colleges and universities, with financial support for these institutions rising by 300 percent. Furthermore, he helped establish the Texas Higher Education Coordinating Board. Under Barnes, salaries increased for university professors, the University of Houston merged with the state university system, and Angelo State College and Pan American College turned into four-year institutions.

Furthermore, Barnes won passage of a minimum wage standard for farm workers, played a key role in winning approval for clean air and water legislation, and successfully fought for a bill creating the Texas Rehabilitation Commission. The political future seemed limitless for Barnes, who enjoyed the support of Connally and President Lyndon Johnson who, after leaving the White House, predicted that his young protégé would one day claim the presidency.

In 1966, Barnes was the President of the National Legislative Conference and in 1967, was voted President of the Southern Legislative Conference—the youngest person and first Texan to receive the honor. He was also U.S. representative to the NATO Conference in 1967, and the United Nations Representative to Geneva, Switzerland, in 1968.

==== Lieutenant governor ====
In his 1968 race for Lieutenant Governor, Barnes carried all 254 counties in both the primary and the general elections; in the latter he won more votes than any candidate had polled up to that time in the history of Texas. Barnes served as Lieutenant Governor of Texas from 1969 to 1973, a post often called the most powerful position in the Texas state government because the lieutenant governor can block a governor's agenda from being considered by the Texas State Senate. As lieutenant governor, he successfully backed an increase in the minimum wage, legislation in the area of mass transportation, and legislation creating the Texas Rehabilitation Commission. Throughout his four terms in the two offices, Barnes also was interested in the issue of higher education. During that time, Texas increased its appropriations for higher education more than threefold, rising to near the top in its ranking among the 50 states in expenditures for higher education. Several new universities and graduate schools originated as a result of increased appropriations.

==== Sharpstown scandal ====
In 1971, Barnes was caught up along with the Democratic Party in Texas in the political fallout of the Sharpstown scandal, though he stated he had no knowledge of the involvement of several state senators in the scheme. While he was not brought to trial, the scandal contributed to an unsuccessful run for governor and Barnes' exit from public office.

==== Claim of helping George W. Bush into the National Guard ====
In 1999, Barnes gave testimony in a deposition for a lawsuit related to the Texas lottery; following the deposition, his lawyer issued a statement to the press. According to the statement, Barnes had called the head of the Texas Air National Guard, Brigadier General James Rose, to recommend future U.S. president George W. Bush for a pilot spot at the request of Bush family friend Sidney Adger. The statement also said, "Neither Congressman Bush nor any other member of the Bush family asked Barnes' help. Barnes has no knowledge that Governor Bush or President Bush knew of Barnes' recommendation." While working as an active fundraiser for John Kerry, Bush's opponent during the 2004 U.S. Presidential campaign, Barnes repeated that he used his political influence to preferentially refer people to the National Guard, including Bush.

Both George W. Bush and his father, former U.S. president George H. W. Bush, have stated that they did not ask Adger to intercede and were unaware of any action he may have taken. Walter Staudt, the colonel in command of Bush's squadron, has stated that he accepted Bush's application without receiving any outside pressure to do so.

==== Involvement in the Iran hostage crisis ====
In March 2023, motivated by news of Jimmy Carter's hospice care, Barnes corroborated the 1980 October Surprise theory by telling journalist Peter Baker of The New York Times that in the summer of 1980 he was unwittingly involved in relaying promises from Reagan campaign officials to ask Iranian officials to withhold release of the hostages they held until after the 1980 presidential elections. According to Barnes, in the summer of 1980 he accompanied former Texas governor and a former candidate in the 1980 presidential election, John Connally, on a trip to several Middle Eastern countries which records indicate to have included Jordan, Syria, Lebanon, Saudi Arabia, Egypt and Israel. Barnes claimed in 2023 that during the trip Connally would promote Ronald Reagan's candidacy to leaders of those countries, and told those leaders (except for the leaders in Israel) ‘It would be very smart for you to pass the word to the Iranians to wait until after this general election is over.’ Barnes asserted that he did not know in advance that Connally would say that on the trip, and believed that Connally was positioning himself for a nomination by a future Reagan Administration for either Secretary of State or Secretary of Defense. Reagan did offer Connally the position of Secretary of Energy, but Connally declined. Barnes also claimed that shortly after returning to the United States, Connally reported on their trip to William J. Casey, who was chairman of Reagan's campaign, and later Director of the Central Intelligence Agency. A note in Connally's files confirms that he had contact with the Reagan camp early during the trip.

Reactions among the former hostages to Barnes' 2023 revelations were mixed. One former hostage criticized Barnes for not coming forward for more than 40 years. Others either did not believe Barnes' account, or said that Barnes confirmed their suspicions as to what went on behind the scenes.

=== Real estate ===
During the 1970s and 1980s, Barnes developed a multimillion-dollar real estate empire which included the development of such projects as Southwest Parkway and Barton Creek Country Club in Austin. The collapse of oil prices in the mid- to late- 1980s and its effect on the Texas real estate market forced Barnes to file for bankruptcy, following the financial collapse of the Barnes/Connally Partnership, a real estate firm.

=== Lobbying and business ===
In the late 1990s, Barnes began working with GTECH Corporation, a company that operated lotteries in 37 states including Texas. Barnes is the founder of the Ben Barnes Group (formerly known as Entrecorp), a business consulting and real estate development firm offering expertise in crisis management, legislative processes and strategy, legal issues, and public-private partnerships. Clients range from major Fortune 500 companies to small family-owned businesses, as from a variety of both international and domestic industries. The Ben Barnes Group maintains offices in Washington, D.C., New York City, and Austin, Texas. He is noted for his success and insider relations in Washington, D.C., and Austin, Texas. He said: "Every Democratic senator who is running for reelection has been to Texas for a fundraiser. We've got one coming up for Tim Johnson [of South Dakota]." Barnes has also served as a consultant, director, or chairman of more than two dozen companies, including SBC Communications, American Airlines, Dallas Bank and Trust, Grumman Systems Support Corporation, and Laredo National Bank.

=== Writing ===
Barnes is the author of the book Barn Burning Barn Building: Tales of a Political Life, From LBJ to George W. Bush and Beyond (ISBN 1-931721-71-8) (with Lisa Dickey), which was first published in 2006. It went on to place on The New York Times Best Seller list.

==== Other ventures ====
In 1995, the University of Texas named him a Distinguished Alumnus and an endowed fellowship was created in his name at UT's Lyndon B. Johnson School of Public Affairs. Barnes serves on the board of several non-profit organizations, including the Boys & Girls Club of the Austin Area, the Roosevelt Institute and the Development Board of the University of Texas. Barnes also serves as vice-chairman of the LBJ Foundation.

== Personal life ==
Barnes was married to Martha Morgan in 1957, and they had two children together: Greg and Amy. He was briefly linked with Jill St. John. On September 14, 2019, Ben Barnes and Elizabeth Moore McDermott married at St. Paul's Episcopal Church in Nantucket.

Party political offices
Preceded by Preston Smith	Democratic nominee for Lieutenant Governor of Texas; 1968, 1970	Succeeded by William P. Hobby Jr.
Texas House of Representatives
Preceded by Ben Sudderth	Member of the Texas House of Representatives from District 73 (De Leon); 1961–1963	Succeeded by Richard C. Slack
Preceded by O. H. Schram	Member of the Texas House of Representatives from District 64 (De Leon); 1963–1969	Succeeded by Lynn Nabers
Political offices
Preceded by Byron M. Tunnell	Speaker of the Texas House of Representatives; 1965–1969	Succeeded by Gus F. Mutscher
Preceded by Preston Smith	Lieutenant Governor of Texas; January 21, 1969–January 16, 1973	Succeeded by William P. Hobby, Jr.
