= Sharpstown scandal =

1971 Texas stock fraud scandal

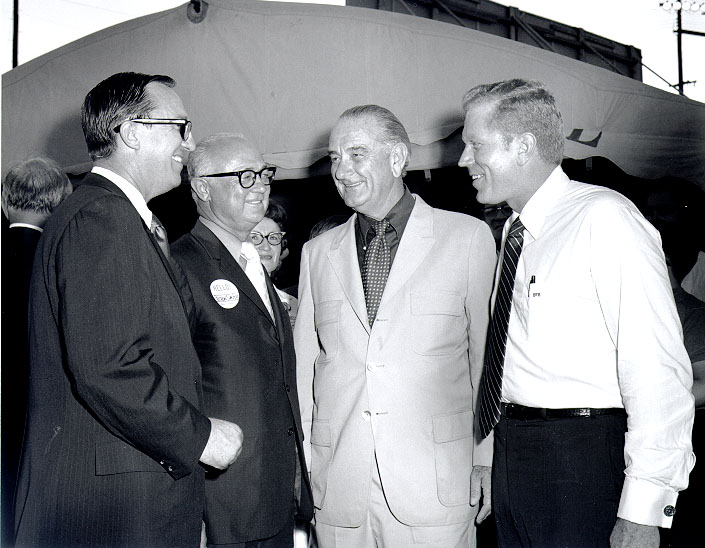
(From left to right) House Speaker Gus F. Mutscher (D), Governor Preston Smith (D), former president Lyndon B. Johnson (D), and Lieutenant Governor Ben Barnes (D), at "Gus Mutscher Day" in Brenham, Texas, August 17, 1970. Within two years, the political careers of Mutscher, Smith, Barnes, and numerous other state officials would be ended by the Sharpstown scandal. President Johnson was not involved.

The Sharpstown scandal was a stock fraud scandal in the state of Texas in 1971 and 1972 involving the highest levels of the state government. The name came from the involvement of the Sharpstown area of Houston.

== Background ==
The scandal revolved around Houston banker and insurance company manager Frank Sharp and his companies, the Sharpstown State Bank and the National Bankers Life Insurance Corporation (NBL). Sharp granted $600,000 in loans from his bank to state officials who would, in turn, purchase stock in National Bankers Life, to be resold later at a huge profit, after Sharp artificially inflated the company's value. One of the victims of the scandal, Strake Jesuit College Preparatory, lost $6,000,000 and a portion of the school's land following the advice of Sharp. The school bought the resold stock at $20–$26 a share. Using the stock as encouragement, Sharp pushed for legislation that would benefit National Bankers Life, increasing the value of the company to its investors—the very people who would push the legislation through.

The scheme succeeded in generating profits for the investors on the order of a quarter of a million dollars, but the U.S. Securities and Exchange Commission (SEC) stepped in early in 1971, filing criminal and civil charges against former state attorney general Waggoner Carr (D), former state insurance commissioner John Osorio, Frank Sharp, and a number of others. By the middle of 1971, anyone in the state government who might have been connected to Sharp was heavily pressured politically. Allegations of bribery to push the favorable bills through the government spread to House Speaker Gus Mutscher Jr. (D), State Representative Thomas Clifton “Tommy” Shannon (D), state Democratic chairman and state banking board member Elmer Baum, Lieutenant Governor Ben Barnes (D), and even Governor Preston Smith (D).

== Outcome ==
Gus Mutscher was indicted by the SEC in late 1971, and subsequently tried in Abilene in 1972. He was found guilty of conspiracy for accepting a bribe from Sharp, and sentenced to five years’ probation. As a convicted felon, he was forced to resign his seat. Mutscher appealed the charges, and after the scandal had calmed down, the charges were overturned. He was then elected to county judge of Washington County, and worked as a political consultant and lobbyist until his death in 2023. Sharp was also found guilty of violating federal banking and securities laws, and was sentenced to three years’ probation and a $5,000 fine.

State Representative Tommy Shannon and Rush McGinty (one of Mutscher’s aides) were also convicted of accepting a bribe from Sharp, and sentenced to five years’ probation.

Although none of the other elected officials were found guilty, the damage had already been done to the two Democratic politicians. 1972 was an election year, and everyone who was remotely connected to the scandal was defeated by more moderate Democrats, Republicans, or other reform candidates.

Although not brought to trial, Governor Preston Smith and Lieutenant Governor Ben Barnes saw their political careers effectively ended. Smith, who called the special session to consider the NBL-favorable legislation and then sold his NBL stock for a $62,500 profit before vetoing the legislation, was defeated in the primaries by businessman Dolph Briscoe of Uvalde.

Attorney General Crawford Martin, who in 1967 issued a legal opinion that was said to have allowed a 2,200% increase in the bank’s capitalization, was defeated in the Democratic Primary for renomination by John L. Hill.

The final impact of the stock fraud scandal on Texas politics occurred during the regular session of the legislature in 1973. The lawmakers, led by new House Speaker Price Daniel Jr. of Liberty, a political moderate and son of a former governor, supported by Attorney General Hill, Lieutenant Governor Hobby, and Governor Briscoe, passed a series of far-reaching reform laws. The legislation required state officials to disclose their sources of income, forced candidates to make public more details about their campaign finances, opened up most governmental records to citizen scrutiny, expanded the requirement for open meetings of governmental policy-making agencies, and imposed new disclosure regulations on paid lobbyists.

== The "Dirty Thirty" ==
"Dirty Thirty" was the name given, by Dan Cain, House Committee Clerk, to thirty members of the 1971 Texas House of Representatives who grouped against Texas Speaker of the House Gus Mutscher and other Texas officials charged in the Sharpstown scandal. The coalition of thirty Democrats and Republicans, conservatives and liberals, has been given credit for keeping the Sharpstown stock fraud scandal alive as a political issue.
