= Gus Franklin Mutscher =

American politician (1932–2023)

Gus Mutscher
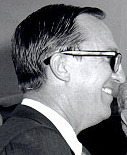

Speaker of the Texas House of Representatives
- In office January 14, 1969 – March 28, 1972
- Preceded by: Ben Barnes
- Succeeded by: Rayford Price

Member of the Texas House of Representatives
- In office January 10, 1961 – January 9, 1973
- Constituency: 45th district (1961–1963); 29th district (1963–1973)

Personal details
- Born: Gus Franklin Mutscher; November 19, 1932 William Penn, Texas, U.S.
- Died: February 26, 2023 (aged 90)
- Party: Democratic
- Spouse: Donna Axum (m. 1969; div. 1972)
- Children: 2

Gus Franklin Mutscher (November 19, 1932 – February 26, 2023) was an American Democratic politician who was the speaker of the Texas House of Representatives from 1969 to 1972. He was one of several Texas politicians indicted in the Sharpstown bank stock fraud scandal. He was convicted and sentenced to five years probation for conspiring to accept a bribe. Mutscher’s conviction, however, was later reversed on appeal.

Mutscher died on February 26, 2023, at the age of 90, just 5 days after his successor Rayford Price.

Political offices
Preceded by Ben Barnes	Speaker of the Texas House of Representatives; 1969–1972	Succeeded by Rayford Price
