= Waggoner Carr =

American politician (1918–2004)

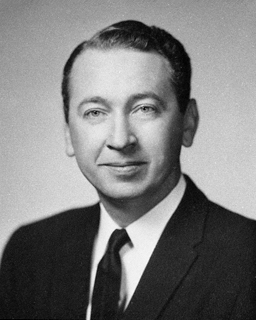
- Carr c. 1959

42nd Attorney General of Texas
- In office 1963–1967
- Governor: John Connally
- Preceded by: Will Wilson
- Succeeded by: Crawford Martin

Speaker of the Texas House of Representatives
- In office January 8, 1957 – January 10, 1961
- Preceded by: Jim T. Lindsey
- Succeeded by: Jimmy Turman

Member of the Texas House of Representatives from the 119th district
- In office January 9, 1951 – January 10, 1961
- Preceded by: Preston Smith
- Succeeded by: J. Collier Adams

County attorney of Lubbock County, Texas
- In office 1949–1951

Personal details
- Born: Vincent Waggoner Carr; October 1, 1918 Fairlie, Texas, U.S.
- Died: February 25, 2004 (aged 85) Austin, Texas, U.S.
- Resting place: Texas State Cemetery
- Party: Democratic
- Spouse: Ernestine Story (m. 1941)
- Education: Texas Tech University; University of Texas at Austin
- Occupation: Attorney, author
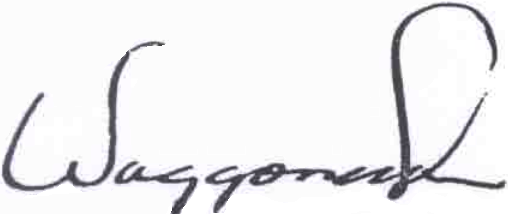
- Signature

Military service
- Allegiance: United States
- Branch/service: United States Army
- Years of service: 1942–1945
- Unit: Army Air Forces
- Battles/wars: World War II

Vincent Waggoner Carr (October 1, 1918 – February 25, 2004) was an American politician who served as the speaker of the Texas House of Representatives from 1957 to 1961 and as the attorney general of Texas from 1963 to 1967.

== Early life ==
Carr was born in Hunt County, East Texas, going on to serve in the Army Air Corps during World War 2. During the Great Depression his family was forced to move to Lubbock after the closure of the family bank.

== Legal and political career ==
He served as Lubbock assistant district attorney in 1947-48 and then Lubbock County attorney from 1949 till 1951. In 1951 he became a member of the Texas House of Representatives, serving until 1961. During his tenure he was Speaker of the House from 1957 to 1961.

=== Attorney General ===
Carr was the Texan attorney general when President John F. Kennedy was assassinated, having had breakfast with him the morning of his killing. Carr was scheduled to give a speech in Dumas that day but owing to the assassination he had to cancel it and flew to Austin in case his assistance was needed. He traveled to Washington to attend Kennedy's funeral and while there communicated his willingness to convene a court of inquiry about the "Oswald case". President Lyndon B. Johnson's aide Cliff Carter told the president that such an inquiry "could be used to clear up any question about the Oswald case in Dallas. He [Carr] said the FBI could conduct this hearing through him in any manner they cared to to complete the record on Oswald". Johnson thought this was a good idea, but suggested that Carr should announce the inquiry without any mention of White House requests. Johnson spoke to the director of the FBI, J. Edgar Hoover, who agreed to the proposal. Ultimately, the inquiry never occurred, as Johnson decided to convene a presidential commission - later known as the Warren Commission - to produce a report on the assassination. On 8 June 1964, Carr testified before the Commission.

In 1966, he unsuccessfully challenged the incumbent Republican John Tower for a seat in the US Senate.

Carr died in February 2004 from cancer.

Party political offices
Preceded by Will Wilson	Democratic nominee for Texas Attorney General; 1962, 1964	Succeeded by Crawford Martin
Preceded by William A. Blakley	Democratic nominee for U.S. Senator from Texas (Class 2); 1966	Succeeded by Barefoot Sanders
Texas House of Representatives
Preceded by Preston Smith	Member of the Texas House of Representatives from District 119 (Lubbock); 1951–1961	Succeeded by J. Collier Adams
Political offices
Preceded by Jim T. Lindsey	Speaker of the Texas House of Representatives; 1957–1961	Succeeded by Jimmy Turman
Legal offices
Preceded by Will Wilson	Texas Attorney General; 1963–1967	Succeeded by Crawford Martin
