= 1988 United States presidential election in Texas =

- November 8, 1988
- Turnout: 66.17% (of registered voters) ▼44.34% (of voting age population) ▼

Nominee	George H. W. Bush	Michael Dukakis
Party	Republican	Democratic
Home state	Texas	Massachusetts
Running mate	Dan Quayle	Lloyd Bentsen
Electoral vote	29	0
Popular vote	3,036,829	2,352,748
Percentage	55.95%	43.35%

Bush
40–50%
50–60%
60–70%
70–80%
80–90%
90–100%
Dukakis
40–50%
50–60%
60–70%
70–80%
80–90%
90–100%
Other
Tie
No Votes
President before election
Ronald Reagan
Republican
Elected President
George H. W. Bush
Republican

The 1988 United States presidential election in Texas took place on November 8, 1988. All fifty states and the District of Columbia, were part of the 1988 United States presidential election. Texas voters chose 29 electors to the Electoral College, which selected the president and vice president.

Incumbent Vice President George H. W. Bush won his home state against Massachusetts Governor Michael Dukakis. Bush ran with Indiana Senator Dan Quayle as Vice President, and Dukakis ran with Texas Senator Lloyd Bentsen.

Texas voted for Bush by a solid 12.6% margin. Texas had been considered a competitive, albeit Republican-leaning, state in the run-up to the election.

== Background ==
Support for the Republican Party of Texas grew during the 1980s. Republican nominee Bill Clements won the governorship in 1978 and returned to the office in 1986 after losing in the 1982 election. Between 1978 and 1986, Republican membership in the Texas House of Representatives rose from 22 to 56, in the United States House of Representatives from 4 to 10, and in local and judicial offices from 0 to 504.

== Campaign ==
=== Primary ===
Dukakis won 38% of the white vote. The racial composition of the Democratic primary was 67% white, 23% black, and 11% Hispanic, and 45% of white voters participated in the Republican primary.

Dukakis selected Texas U.S. Senator Lloyd Bentsen, who had previously been considered in 1984, to serve as his vice-presidential running mate. U.S. Senator Phil Gramm nominated Bush at the Republican National Convention.

=== General ===
Bentsen was running for reelection in the concurrent senatorial election against Republican nominee Beau Boulter. The Bush campaign and Texas GOP were initially interested in aiding Boulter, but later pursued a Texas Ticket strategy in which they promoted voting for both Bush in the presidential election and Bentsen in the senatorial election. Bentsen criticized the strategy on October 22, stating that the "Republicans are trying to peddle the notion that you can vote twice for Texas by voting for George Bush and Lloyd Bentsen". Bentsen won reelection despite the Republican victory in the presidential election.

Among white voters, 61% supported Bush while 38% supported Dukakis.

As of the 2024 presidential election, and despite Bill Clinton's two ensuing nationwide election victories (while holding the Republican margin of victory in Texas to single digits both times), the 1988 election constitutes the last occasion when Lee County, Calhoun County and San Saba County have supported the Democratic presidential nominee.

== Results ==
1988 United States presidential election in Texas
Party	Candidate	Votes	Percentage	Electoral votes
Republican	George H. W. Bush	3,036,829	55.95%	29
Democratic	Michael Dukakis	2,352,748	43.35%	0
Libertarian	Ron Paul	30,355 (Note: The figure given in Dave Leip’s U.S. Election Atlas is 30,355, but this figure is the sum of all the county votes for Paul.)	0.56%	0
New Alliance Party	Lenora Fulani	7,208	0.13%	0
Write-Ins		160 (Note: Some of these votes may not have been included by county.)	>0.01%	0
Socialist Workers Party	James Warren	110	>0.01%	0
Totals		5,427,410	100.0%	29

=== Results by county ===
County	George H. W. Bush Republican		Michael Dukakis Democratic		Ron Paul Libertarian		Various candidates Other parties		Margin		Total votes cast
County	#	%	#	%	#	%	#	%	#	%	Total votes cast
Anderson	7,858	55.95%	6,128	43.63%	49	0.35%	10	0.07%	1,730	12.32%	14,045
Andrews	3,052	72.82%	1,122	26.77%	12	0.29%	5	0.12%	1,930	46.05%	4,191
Angelina	12,738	53.40%	10,849	45.48%	249	1.04%	16	0.07%	1,889	7.92%	23,852
Aransas	3,858	62.27%	2,305	37.20%	29	0.47%	4	0.06%	1,553	25.07%	6,196
Archer	2,010	55.13%	1,627	44.62%	9	0.25%	0	0.00%	383	10.51%	3,646
Armstrong	720	69.23%	314	30.19%	6	0.58%	0	0.00%	406	39.04%	1,040
Atascosa	4,777	50.26%	4,657	49.00%	63	0.66%	7	0.07%	120	1.26%	9,504
Austin	4,524	63.18%	2,593	36.22%	41	0.57%	2	0.03%	1,931	26.96%	7,160
Bailey	1,459	62.27%	876	37.39%	8	0.34%	0	0.00%	583	24.88%	2,343
Bandera	3,435	72.15%	1,251	26.28%	72	1.51%	3	0.06%	2,184	45.87%	4,761
Bastrop	5,991	42.51%	8,004	56.80%	91	0.65%	6	0.04%	-2,013	-14.29%	14,092
Baylor	914	44.15%	1,153	55.70%	3	0.14%	0	0.00%	-239	-11.55%	2,070
Bee	4,620	49.78%	4,616	49.74%	39	0.42%	6	0.06%	4	0.04%	9,281
Bell	29,382	61.79%	17,751	37.33%	365	0.77%	53	0.11%	11,631	24.46%	47,551
Bexar	193,192	52.25%	174,036	47.07%	2,144	0.58%	377	0.10%	19,156	5.18%	369,749
Blanco	1,680	61.79%	1,012	37.22%	24	0.88%	3	0.11%	668	24.57%	2,719
Borden	283	62.33%	169	37.22%	1	0.22%	1	0.22%	114	25.11%	454
Bosque	3,458	56.26%	2,670	43.44%	16	0.26%	3	0.05%	788	12.82%	6,147
Bowie	15,454	55.31%	12,331	44.13%	131	0.47%	25	0.09%	3,123	11.18%	27,941
Brazoria	34,028	57.60%	23,436	39.67%	1,549	2.62%	68	0.12%	10,592	17.93%	59,081
Brazos	29,369	65.72%	14,885	33.31%	348	0.78%	88	0.20%	14,484	32.41%	44,690
Brewster	1,708	51.55%	1,569	47.36%	33	1.00%	3	0.09%	139	4.19%	3,313
Briscoe	464	44.27%	574	54.77%	8	0.76%	2	0.19%	-110	-10.50%	1,048
Brooks	608	17.43%	2,859	81.94%	10	0.29%	12	0.34%	-2,251	-64.51%	3,489
Brown	6,810	58.68%	4,763	41.04%	29	0.25%	4	0.03%	2,047	17.64%	11,606
Burleson	2,242	41.99%	3,085	57.78%	11	0.21%	1	0.02%	-843	-15.79%	5,339
Burnet	5,120	53.85%	4,343	45.68%	42	0.44%	3	0.03%	777	8.17%	9,508
Caldwell	3,553	43.00%	4,649	56.27%	52	0.63%	8	0.10%	-1,096	-13.27%	8,262
Calhoun	3,183	48.79%	3,314	50.80%	21	0.32%	6	0.09%	-131	-2.01%	6,524
Callahan	2,887	58.67%	2,017	40.99%	10	0.20%	7	0.14%	870	17.68%	4,921
Cameron	24,263	43.68%	30,972	55.75%	253	0.46%	64	0.12%	-6,709	-12.07%	55,552
Camp	1,908	47.20%	2,121	52.47%	12	0.30%	1	0.02%	-213	-5.27%	4,042
Carson	2,100	66.71%	1,034	32.85%	11	0.35%	3	0.10%	1,066	33.86%	3,148
Cass	5,305	47.11%	5,941	52.75%	14	0.12%	2	0.02%	-636	-5.64%	11,262
Castro	1,604	52.61%	1,436	47.10%	8	0.26%	1	0.03%	168	5.51%	3,049
Chambers	3,694	54.48%	3,035	44.76%	46	0.68%	6	0.09%	659	9.72%	6,781
Cherokee	7,520	57.12%	5,604	42.57%	38	0.29%	3	0.02%	1,916	14.55%	13,165
Childress	1,201	52.98%	1,060	46.76%	6	0.26%	0	0.00%	141	6.22%	2,267
Clay	2,043	47.07%	2,288	52.72%	8	0.18%	1	0.02%	-245	-5.65%	4,340
Cochran	771	52.74%	681	46.58%	8	0.55%	2	0.14%	90	6.16%	1,462
Coke	863	55.97%	674	43.71%	4	0.26%	1	0.06%	189	12.26%	1,542
Coleman	2,340	54.15%	1,978	45.78%	3	0.07%	0	0.00%	362	8.37%	4,321
Collin	67,776	74.29%	22,934	25.14%	465	0.51%	55	0.06%	44,842	49.15%	91,230
Collingsworth	872	51.81%	809	48.07%	2	0.12%	0	0.00%	63	3.74%	1,683
Colorado	3,723	56.41%	2,847	43.14%	26	0.39%	4	0.06%	876	13.27%	6,600
Comal	13,994	70.04%	5,716	28.61%	237	1.19%	33	0.17%	8,278	41.43%	19,980
Comanche	2,120	44.53%	2,622	55.07%	18	0.38%	1	0.02%	-502	-10.54%	4,761
Concho	617	48.85%	643	50.91%	1	0.08%	2	0.16%	-26	-2.06%	1,263
Cooke	7,196	62.84%	4,217	36.82%	30	0.26%	9	0.08%	2,979	26.02%	11,452
Coryell	7,461	64.17%	4,026	34.63%	123	1.06%	17	0.15%	3,435	29.54%	11,627
Cottle	379	35.00%	690	63.71%	14	1.29%	0	0.00%	-311	-28.71%	1,083
Crane	1,219	67.05%	596	32.78%	3	0.17%	0	0.00%	623	34.27%	1,818
Crockett	932	51.24%	881	48.43%	6	0.33%	0	0.00%	51	2.81%	1,819
Crosby	1,121	43.75%	1,435	56.01%	5	0.20%	1	0.04%	-314	-12.26%	2,562
Culberson	417	42.46%	557	56.72%	3	0.31%	5	0.51%	-140	-14.26%	982
Dallam	1,205	64.72%	645	34.64%	12	0.64%	0	0.00%	560	30.08%	1,862
Dallas	347,094	58.38%	243,198	40.91%	3,446	0.58%	800	0.13%	103,896	17.47%	594,538
Dawson	3,154	59.32%	2,155	40.53%	6	0.11%	2	0.04%	999	18.79%	5,317
Deaf Smith	3,744	65.39%	1,930	33.71%	36	0.63%	16	0.28%	1,814	31.68%	5,726
Delta	849	40.41%	1,244	59.21%	8	0.38%	0	0.00%	-395	-18.80%	2,101
Denton	57,444	68.22%	26,204	31.12%	474	0.56%	88	0.10%	31,240	37.10%	84,210
DeWitt	3,628	58.00%	2,579	41.23%	43	0.69%	5	0.08%	1,049	16.77%	6,255
Dickens	435	38.12%	696	61.00%	7	0.61%	3	0.26%	-261	-22.88%	1,141
Dimmit	900	24.65%	2,735	74.91%	12	0.33%	4	0.11%	-1,835	-50.26%	3,651
Donley	1,043	60.89%	661	38.59%	9	0.53%	0	0.00%	382	22.30%	1,713
Duval	907	17.79%	4,177	81.95%	11	0.22%	2	0.04%	-3,270	-64.16%	5,097
Eastland	3,929	54.83%	3,215	44.86%	19	0.27%	3	0.04%	714	9.97%	7,166
Ector	23,155	67.80%	10,825	31.70%	152	0.45%	20	0.06%	12,330	36.10%	34,152
Edwards	556	59.78%	368	39.57%	4	0.43%	2	0.22%	188	20.21%	930
Ellis	16,422	59.18%	11,169	40.25%	104	0.37%	54	0.19%	5,253	18.93%	27,749
El Paso	55,573	46.79%	62,622	52.72%	434	0.37%	152	0.13%	-7,049	-5.93%	118,781
Erath	5,427	56.71%	4,113	42.98%	0	0.00%	30	0.31%	1,314	13.73%	9,570
Falls	2,344	44.76%	2,877	54.94%	11	0.21%	5	0.10%	-533	-10.18%	5,237
Fannin	4,024	43.67%	5,163	56.03%	23	0.25%	4	0.04%	-1,139	-12.36%	9,214
Fayette	4,551	57.09%	3,390	42.53%	29	0.36%	1	0.01%	1,161	14.56%	7,971
Fisher	721	32.19%	1,516	67.68%	3	0.13%	0	0.00%	-795	-35.49%	2,240
Floyd	1,741	55.48%	1,391	44.33%	3	0.10%	3	0.10%	350	11.15%	3,138
Foard	306	37.32%	513	62.56%	1	0.12%	0	0.00%	-207	-25.24%	820
Fort Bend	39,818	62.43%	23,351	36.61%	458	0.72%	157	0.25%	16,467	25.82%	63,784
Franklin	1,439	49.69%	1,453	50.17%	3	0.10%	1	0.03%	-14	-0.48%	2,896
Freestone	3,159	51.85%	2,916	47.87%	16	0.26%	1	0.02%	243	3.98%	6,092
Frio	1,505	33.16%	3,016	66.46%	16	0.35%	1	0.02%	-1,511	-33.30%	4,538
Gaines	2,265	62.81%	1,310	36.33%	28	0.78%	3	0.08%	955	26.48%	3,606
Galveston	34,913	47.15%	38,633	52.18%	431	0.58%	65	0.09%	-3,720	-5.03%	74,042
Garza	1,183	54.02%	989	45.16%	17	0.78%	1	0.05%	194	8.86%	2,190
Gillespie	5,662	77.42%	1,588	21.71%	61	0.83%	2	0.03%	4,074	55.71%	7,313
Glasscock	384	72.73%	143	27.08%	1	0.19%	0	0.00%	241	45.65%	528
Goliad	1,427	51.11%	1,358	48.64%	7	0.25%	0	0.00%	69	2.47%	2,792
Gonzales	2,983	50.42%	2,897	48.97%	35	0.59%	1	0.02%	86	1.45%	5,916
Gray	7,259	74.22%	2,460	25.15%	55	0.56%	7	0.07%	4,799	49.07%	9,781
Grayson	18,825	56.55%	14,347	43.10%	97	0.29%	18	0.05%	4,478	13.45%	33,287
Gregg	26,465	67.19%	12,486	31.70%	416	1.06%	20	0.05%	13,979	35.49%	39,387
Grimes	2,820	50.52%	2,735	49.00%	23	0.41%	4	0.07%	85	1.52%	5,582
Guadalupe	13,265	64.37%	7,111	34.50%	0	0.00%	233	1.13%	6,154	29.87%	20,609
Hale	6,284	64.05%	3,502	35.69%	19	0.19%	6	0.06%	2,782	28.36%	9,811
Hall	714	40.96%	1,029	59.04%	0	0.00%	0	0.00%	-315	-18.08%	1,743
Hamilton	1,718	55.67%	1,355	43.91%	12	0.39%	1	0.03%	363	11.76%	3,086
Hansford	1,967	81.25%	443	18.30%	11	0.45%	0	0.00%	1,524	62.95%	2,421
Hardeman	855	42.73%	1,143	57.12%	2	0.10%	1	0.05%	-288	-14.39%	2,001
Hardin	6,897	45.46%	8,245	54.34%	28	0.18%	3	0.02%	-1,348	-8.88%	15,173
Harris	464,217	57.02%	342,919	42.12%	5,205	0.64%	1,819	0.22%	121,298	14.90%	814,160
Harrison	11,957	56.18%	8,974	42.16%	335	1.57%	19	0.09%	2,983	14.02%	21,285
Hartley	1,229	70.35%	505	28.91%	11	0.63%	2	0.11%	724	41.44%	1,747
Haskell	1,193	40.93%	1,715	58.83%	5	0.17%	2	0.07%	-522	-17.90%	2,915
Hays	11,716	50.36%	11,187	48.09%	330	1.42%	31	0.13%	529	2.27%	23,264
Hemphill	1,170	68.62%	527	30.91%	8	0.47%	0	0.00%	643	37.71%	1,705
Henderson	11,005	52.61%	9,819	46.94%	73	0.35%	21	0.10%	1,186	5.67%	20,918
Hidalgo	29,246	34.87%	54,330	64.78%	210	0.25%	84	0.10%	-25,084	-29.91%	83,870
Hill	4,796	52.14%	4,381	47.63%	20	0.22%	1	0.01%	415	4.51%	9,198
Hockley	4,368	60.25%	2,850	39.31%	27	0.37%	5	0.07%	1,518	20.94%	7,250
Hood	7,400	63.16%	4,255	36.32%	55	0.47%	6	0.05%	3,145	26.84%	11,716
Hopkins	5,133	50.61%	4,984	49.14%	25	0.25%	0	0.00%	149	1.47%	10,142
Houston	3,882	50.00%	3,846	49.54%	30	0.39%	6	0.08%	36	0.46%	7,764
Howard	6,024	57.28%	4,445	42.26%	41	0.39%	7	0.07%	1,579	15.02%	10,517
Hudspeth	405	49.63%	406	49.75%	4	0.49%	1	0.12%	-1	-0.12%	816
Hunt	12,331	58.06%	8,820	41.53%	79	0.37%	8	0.04%	3,511	16.53%	21,238
Hutchinson	7,526	71.50%	2,950	28.03%	43	0.41%	7	0.07%	4,576	43.47%	10,526
Irion	539	62.17%	326	37.60%	1	0.12%	1	0.12%	213	24.57%	867
Jack	1,542	50.16%	1,521	49.48%	11	0.36%	0	0.00%	21	0.68%	3,074
Jackson	2,954	57.75%	2,141	41.86%	18	0.35%	2	0.04%	813	15.89%	5,115
Jasper	4,985	42.87%	6,613	56.87%	28	0.24%	3	0.03%	-1,628	-14.00%	11,629
Jeff Davis	524	60.23%	325	37.36%	19	2.18%	2	0.23%	199	22.87%	870
Jefferson	35,754	38.99%	55,649	60.69%	209	0.23%	81	0.09%	-19,895	-21.70%	91,693
Jim Hogg	510	23.80%	1,630	76.06%	2	0.09%	1	0.05%	-1,120	-52.26%	2,143
Jim Wells	4,335	33.64%	8,495	65.92%	42	0.33%	14	0.11%	-4,160	-32.28%	12,886
Johnson	17,509	58.03%	12,507	41.45%	139	0.46%	16	0.05%	5,002	16.58%	30,171
Jones	3,000	50.71%	2,898	48.99%	17	0.29%	1	0.02%	102	1.72%	5,916
Karnes	2,383	48.31%	2,529	51.27%	18	0.36%	3	0.06%	-146	-2.96%	4,933
Kaufman	8,466	53.19%	7,358	46.23%	72	0.45%	20	0.13%	1,108	6.96%	15,916
Kendall	4,875	76.20%	1,446	22.60%	75	1.17%	2	0.03%	3,429	53.60%	6,398
Kenedy	76	38.78%	119	60.71%	1	0.51%	0	0.00%	-43	-21.93%	196
Kent	274	40.65%	398	59.05%	1	0.15%	1	0.15%	-124	-18.40%	674
Kerr	11,207	75.03%	3,587	24.01%	139	0.93%	4	0.03%	7,620	51.02%	14,937
Kimble	1,061	65.62%	551	34.08%	4	0.25%	1	0.06%	510	31.54%	1,617
King	111	63.43%	64	36.57%	0	0.00%	0	0.00%	47	26.86%	175
Kinney	771	53.17%	669	46.14%	8	0.55%	2	0.14%	102	7.03%	1,450
Kleberg	4,443	44.67%	5,367	53.96%	132	1.33%	4	0.04%	-924	-9.29%	9,946
Knox	765	42.93%	1,013	56.85%	3	0.17%	1	0.06%	-248	-13.92%	1,782
Lamar	8,021	51.42%	7,553	48.42%	21	0.13%	3	0.02%	468	3.00%	15,598
Lamb	3,064	57.64%	2,230	41.95%	17	0.32%	5	0.09%	834	15.69%	5,316
Lampasas	3,000	60.41%	1,954	39.35%	6	0.12%	6	0.12%	1,046	21.06%	4,966
La Salle	693	29.46%	1,651	70.20%	6	0.26%	2	0.09%	-958	-40.74%	2,352
Lavaca	4,377	54.97%	3,531	44.35%	52	0.65%	2	0.03%	846	10.62%	7,962
Lee	2,513	49.60%	2,527	49.87%	23	0.45%	4	0.08%	-14	-0.27%	5,067
Leon	2,778	54.31%	2,316	45.28%	21	0.41%	0	0.00%	462	9.03%	5,115
Liberty	8,524	50.22%	8,343	49.15%	95	0.56%	11	0.06%	181	1.07%	16,973
Limestone	3,257	48.16%	3,476	51.40%	28	0.41%	2	0.03%	-219	-3.24%	6,763
Lipscomb	1,111	74.12%	377	25.15%	10	0.67%	1	0.07%	734	48.97%	1,499
Live Oak	2,277	58.69%	1,573	40.54%	29	0.75%	1	0.03%	704	18.15%	3,880
Llano	3,550	57.24%	2,629	42.39%	21	0.34%	2	0.03%	921	14.85%	6,202
Loving	54	70.13%	23	29.87%	0	0.00%	0	0.00%	31	40.26%	77
Lubbock	50,760	69.26%	22,202	30.29%	269	0.37%	61	0.08%	28,558	38.97%	73,292
Lynn	1,279	54.03%	1,086	45.88%	2	0.08%	0	0.00%	193	8.15%	2,367
Madison	1,896	50.60%	1,835	48.97%	16	0.43%	0	0.00%	61	1.63%	3,747
Marion	1,857	44.97%	2,255	54.61%	16	0.39%	1	0.02%	-398	-9.64%	4,129
Martin	1,017	61.60%	632	38.28%	2	0.12%	0	0.00%	385	23.32%	1,651
Mason	975	58.91%	671	40.54%	9	0.54%	0	0.00%	304	18.37%	1,655
Matagorda	6,787	54.01%	5,675	45.16%	92	0.73%	12	0.10%	1,112	8.85%	12,566
Maverick	1,592	26.52%	4,395	73.21%	10	0.17%	6	0.10%	-2,803	-46.69%	6,003
McCulloch	1,618	49.13%	1,665	50.56%	10	0.30%	0	0.00%	-47	-1.43%	3,293
McLennan	38,606	58.12%	27,545	41.47%	220	0.33%	52	0.08%	11,061	16.65%	66,423
McMullen	302	75.88%	94	23.62%	2	0.50%	0	0.00%	208	52.26%	398
Medina	5,722	57.05%	4,227	42.15%	75	0.75%	5	0.05%	1,495	14.90%	10,029
Menard	552	47.14%	614	52.43%	5	0.43%	0	0.00%	-62	-5.29%	1,171
Midland	30,618	77.86%	8,487	21.58%	209	0.53%	12	0.03%	22,131	56.28%	39,326
Milam	3,512	41.83%	4,865	57.94%	17	0.20%	2	0.02%	-1,353	-16.11%	8,396
Mills	1,043	55.24%	842	44.60%	3	0.16%	0	0.00%	201	10.64%	1,888
Mitchell	1,596	47.27%	1,773	52.52%	2	0.06%	5	0.15%	-177	-5.25%	3,376
Montague	3,475	48.36%	3,689	51.34%	19	0.26%	3	0.04%	-214	-2.98%	7,186
Montgomery	40,360	68.24%	18,394	31.10%	354	0.60%	38	0.06%	21,966	37.14%	59,146
Moore	3,710	70.25%	1,537	29.10%	21	0.40%	13	0.25%	2,173	41.15%	5,281
Morris	2,104	37.37%	3,522	62.56%	3	0.05%	1	0.02%	-1,418	-25.19%	5,630
Motley	429	61.99%	262	37.86%	1	0.14%	0	0.00%	167	24.13%	692
Nacogdoches	11,767	62.32%	6,886	36.47%	211	1.12%	19	0.10%	4,881	25.85%	18,883
Navarro	6,445	48.71%	6,749	51.01%	34	0.26%	4	0.03%	-304	-2.30%	13,232
Newton	1,659	31.25%	3,640	68.56%	6	0.11%	4	0.08%	-1,981	-37.31%	5,309
Nolan	2,734	48.74%	2,853	50.86%	19	0.34%	3	0.05%	-119	-2.12%	5,609
Nueces	46,337	48.30%	49,209	51.30%	293	0.31%	93	0.10%	-2,872	-3.00%	95,932
Ochiltree	2,928	83.25%	579	16.46%	8	0.23%	2	0.06%	2,349	66.79%	3,517
Oldham	691	68.82%	303	30.18%	9	0.90%	1	0.10%	388	38.64%	1,004
Orange	11,959	39.99%	17,834	59.63%	100	0.33%	15	0.05%	-5,875	-19.64%	29,908
Palo Pinto	4,649	53.85%	3,930	45.52%	47	0.54%	8	0.09%	719	8.33%	8,634
Panola	4,642	52.87%	4,123	46.96%	13	0.15%	2	0.02%	519	5.91%	8,780
Parker	14,090	62.01%	8,517	37.48%	103	0.45%	13	0.06%	5,573	24.53%	22,723
Parmer	2,061	72.60%	764	26.91%	12	0.42%	2	0.07%	1,297	45.69%	2,839
Pecos	2,483	55.67%	1,960	43.95%	13	0.29%	4	0.09%	523	11.72%	4,460
Polk	5,831	48.88%	5,943	49.82%	145	1.22%	10	0.08%	-112	-0.94%	11,929
Potter	16,400	62.76%	9,563	36.60%	147	0.56%	21	0.08%	6,837	26.16%	26,131
Presidio	586	33.09%	1,176	66.40%	7	0.40%	2	0.11%	-590	-33.31%	1,771
Rains	1,281	46.82%	1,448	52.92%	4	0.15%	3	0.11%	-167	-6.10%	2,736
Randall	27,986	76.33%	8,492	23.16%	173	0.47%	15	0.04%	19,494	53.17%	36,666
Reagan	935	69.00%	418	30.85%	2	0.15%	0	0.00%	517	38.15%	1,355
Real	795	61.58%	483	37.41%	11	0.85%	2	0.15%	312	24.17%	1,291
Red River	2,475	43.79%	3,165	56.00%	11	0.19%	1	0.02%	-690	-12.21%	5,652
Reeves	1,724	37.86%	2,812	61.75%	9	0.20%	9	0.20%	-1,088	-23.89%	4,554
Refugio	1,883	50.56%	1,831	49.17%	8	0.21%	2	0.05%	52	1.39%	3,724
Roberts	441	75.90%	135	23.24%	5	0.86%	0	0.00%	306	52.66%	581
Robertson	2,184	37.45%	3,630	62.24%	16	0.27%	2	0.03%	-1,446	-24.79%	5,832
Rockwall	7,214	72.58%	2,659	26.75%	60	0.60%	6	0.06%	4,555	45.83%	9,939
Runnels	2,417	58.28%	1,720	41.48%	9	0.22%	1	0.02%	697	16.80%	4,147
Rusk	9,117	63.70%	5,140	35.91%	49	0.34%	7	0.05%	3,977	27.79%	14,313
Sabine	1,925	48.28%	2,053	51.49%	9	0.23%	0	0.00%	-128	-3.21%	3,987
San Augustine	1,946	47.65%	2,118	51.86%	9	0.22%	11	0.27%	-172	-4.21%	4,084
San Jacinto	2,691	47.31%	2,972	52.25%	25	0.44%	0	0.00%	-281	-4.94%	5,688
San Patricio	9,159	47.07%	9,920	50.98%	355	1.82%	24	0.12%	-761	-3.91%	19,458
San Saba	1,099	48.27%	1,165	51.16%	12	0.53%	1	0.04%	-66	-2.89%	2,277
Schleicher	653	56.44%	494	42.70%	7	0.61%	3	0.26%	159	13.74%	1,157
Scurry	3,749	63.61%	2,119	35.95%	24	0.41%	2	0.03%	1,630	27.66%	5,894
Shackelford	865	55.66%	681	43.82%	8	0.51%	0	0.00%	184	11.84%	1,554
Shelby	3,999	48.34%	4,261	51.50%	12	0.15%	1	0.01%	-262	-3.16%	8,273
Sherman	1,145	76.38%	340	22.68%	12	0.80%	2	0.13%	805	53.70%	1,499
Smith	34,658	64.67%	18,719	34.93%	184	0.34%	31	0.06%	15,939	29.74%	53,592
Somervell	1,304	56.79%	983	42.81%	9	0.39%	0	0.00%	321	13.98%	2,296
Starr	1,218	14.83%	6,958	84.74%	30	0.37%	5	0.06%	-5,740	-69.91%	8,211
Stephens	2,342	60.45%	1,519	39.21%	12	0.31%	1	0.03%	823	21.24%	3,874
Sterling	464	70.73%	188	28.66%	3	0.46%	1	0.15%	276	42.07%	656
Stonewall	421	36.70%	724	63.12%	1	0.09%	1	0.09%	-303	-26.42%	1,147
Sutton	996	63.44%	571	36.37%	2	0.13%	1	0.06%	425	27.07%	1,570
Swisher	1,271	39.98%	1,893	59.55%	15	0.47%	0	0.00%	-622	-19.57%	3,179
Tarrant	242,660	61.24%	151,310	38.19%	1,797	0.45%	470	0.12%	91,350	23.05%	396,237
Taylor	28,563	67.97%	13,073	31.11%	357	0.85%	31	0.07%	15,490	36.86%	42,024
Terrell	296	42.96%	390	56.60%	2	0.29%	1	0.15%	-94	-13.64%	689
Terry	2,645	57.50%	1,941	42.20%	13	0.28%	1	0.02%	704	15.30%	4,600
Throckmorton	455	45.59%	534	53.51%	8	0.80%	1	0.10%	-79	-7.92%	998
Titus	4,247	49.27%	4,357	50.55%	15	0.17%	1	0.01%	-110	-1.28%	8,620
Tom Green	21,463	63.10%	12,283	36.11%	229	0.67%	37	0.11%	9,180	26.99%	34,012
Travis	105,915	44.86%	127,783	54.13%	1,777	0.75%	609	0.26%	-21,868	-9.27%	236,084
Trinity	2,448	47.65%	2,657	51.72%	30	0.58%	2	0.04%	-209	-4.07%	5,137
Tyler	3,070	42.10%	4,198	57.57%	23	0.32%	1	0.01%	-1,128	-15.47%	7,292
Upshur	5,991	53.18%	5,242	46.53%	30	0.27%	2	0.02%	749	6.65%	11,265
Upton	1,189	68.33%	544	31.26%	4	0.23%	3	0.17%	645	37.07%	1,740
Uvalde	4,266	53.32%	3,684	46.04%	44	0.55%	7	0.09%	582	7.28%	8,001
Val Verde	5,109	50.03%	5,044	49.40%	50	0.49%	8	0.08%	65	0.63%	10,211
Van Zandt	7,371	54.36%	6,153	45.38%	33	0.24%	2	0.01%	1,218	8.98%	13,559
Victoria	15,056	62.08%	8,923	36.79%	247	1.02%	27	0.11%	6,133	25.29%	24,253
Walker	8,473	58.88%	5,826	40.48%	82	0.57%	10	0.07%	2,647	18.40%	14,391
Waller	3,607	47.31%	3,957	51.90%	50	0.66%	10	0.13%	-350	-4.59%	7,624
Ward	2,709	59.02%	1,858	40.48%	19	0.41%	4	0.09%	851	18.54%	4,590
Washington	6,041	66.85%	2,960	32.75%	31	0.34%	5	0.06%	3,081	34.10%	9,037
Webb	7,528	31.59%	16,227	68.09%	43	0.18%	34	0.14%	-8,699	-36.50%	23,832
Wharton	6,978	53.71%	5,935	45.69%	65	0.50%	13	0.10%	1,043	8.02%	12,991
Wheeler	1,703	61.33%	1,067	38.42%	7	0.25%	0	0.00%	636	22.91%	2,777
Wichita	23,324	56.08%	17,956	43.17%	262	0.63%	48	0.12%	5,368	12.91%	41,590
Wilbarger	2,669	54.15%	2,248	45.61%	12	0.24%	0	0.00%	421	8.54%	4,929
Willacy	1,750	35.43%	3,165	64.07%	21	0.43%	4	0.08%	-1,415	-28.64%	4,940
Williamson	27,322	57.85%	19,589	41.48%	267	0.57%	52	0.11%	7,733	16.37%	47,230
Wilson	4,436	52.65%	3,953	46.92%	32	0.38%	4	0.05%	483	5.73%	8,425
Winkler	1,656	63.42%	947	36.27%	7	0.27%	1	0.04%	709	27.15%	2,611
Wise	6,064	53.22%	5,288	46.41%	38	0.33%	5	0.04%	776	6.81%	11,395
Wood	6,216	54.69%	4,553	40.06%	33	0.29%	564	4.96%	1,663	14.63%	11,366
Yoakum	1,762	70.28%	727	29.00%	16	0.64%	2	0.08%	1,035	41.28%	2,507
Young	4,156	57.78%	3,007	41.80%	28	0.39%	2	0.03%	1,149	15.98%	7,193
Zapata	958	30.56%	2,171	69.25%	5	0.16%	1	0.03%	-1,213	-38.69%	3,135
Zavala	628	15.81%	3,338	84.02%	7	0.18%	0	0.00%	-2,710	-68.21%	3,973
Totals	3,036,829	55.95%	2,352,748	43.35%	30,355	0.56%	7,478	0.14%	684,081	12.60%	5,427,410

==== Counties that flipped from Republican to Democratic ====
- Bastrop
- Baylor
- Briscoe
- Burleson
- Caldwell
- Calhoun
- Cameron
- Camp
- Cass
- Clay
- Comanche
- Concho
- Crosby
- Culberson
- Delta
- El Paso
- Falls
- Fannin
- Foard
- Franklin
- Galveston
- Hall
- Hardeman
- Hardin
- Haskell
- Hudspeth
- Jasper
- Karnes
- Kent
- Kleberg
- Knox
- Lee
- Limestone
- Marion
- McCulloch
- Menard
- Milam
- Mitchell
- Montague
- Navarro
- Nolan
- Nueces
- Polk
- Rains
- Red River
- Reeves
- Sabine
- San Augustine
- San Jacinto
- San Patricio
- San Saba
- Shelby
- Terrell
- Throckmorton
- Titus
- Travis
- Trinity
- Tyler
- Waller

== See also ==
- United States presidential elections in Texas
- Presidency of George H. W. Bush

== Works cited ==
- Black, Earl; Black, Merle (1992). The Vital South: How Presidents Are Elected. Harvard University Press. ISBN 0674941306.
- Moreland, Laurence; Steed, Robert; Baker, Tod, eds. (1991). The 1988 Presidential Election in the South: Continuity Amidst Change in Southern Party Politics. Praeger Publishers. ISBN 0275931455.
