= Charles Duncan Jr. =

American governmental official (1926–2022)

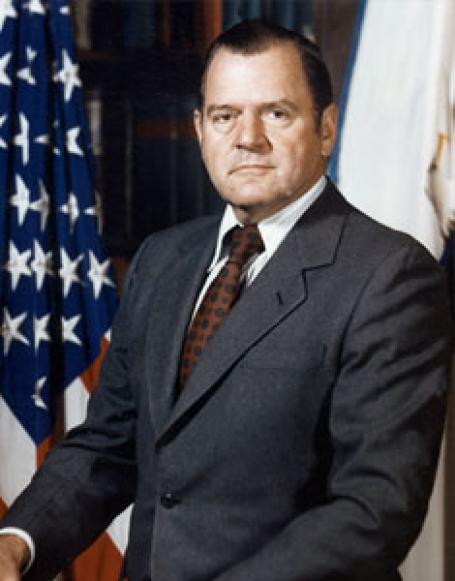

2nd United States Secretary of Energy
- In office August 24, 1979 – January 20, 1981
- President: Jimmy Carter
- Preceded by: James R. Schlesinger
- Succeeded by: James B. Edwards

17th United States Deputy Secretary of Defense
- In office January 31, 1977 – July 26, 1979
- President: Jimmy Carter
- Preceded by: Robert Ellsworth
- Succeeded by: W. Graham Claytor Jr.

Personal details
- Born: Charles William Duncan Jr. September 9, 1926 Houston, Texas, U.S.
- Died: October 18, 2022 (aged 96) Houston, Texas, U.S.
- Party: Democratic
- Spouse: Anne Smith
- Children: 2
- Education: Rice University (BS); University of Texas at Austin

Military service
- Allegiance: United States
- Branch/service: United States Army; Army Air Corps
- Battles/wars: World War II

Charles William Duncan Jr. (September 9, 1926 – October 18, 2022) was an American businessman, administrator, and politician who served as the second United States secretary of energy in the Cabinet of President Jimmy Carter from 1979 to 1981. He had previously served as Carter's United States Deputy Secretary of Defense during the Iranian Revolution. Earlier, Duncan had run the family business, Duncan Coffee Company of Houston, Texas, for seven years, until the Coca-Cola Company acquired it in 1964. After seven years on the Coke board, Duncan became the corporation's president.

== Early years ==
Duncan was born on September 9, 1926, in Houston, Texas. He was the older of two children. Duncan prepped at the Sewanee Military Academy in Sewanee, Tennessee, and served two years in the U.S. Army Air Corps during World War II. He graduated from Rice University in 1947 with a degree in chemical engineering. Duncan also pursued two years of graduate work in business administration at the University of Texas and worked briefly as a roustabout and chemical engineer for Humble Oil and Refining Corporation (now Exxon).

== Duncan Coffee Company ==
In 1957, Duncan joined his family's coffee business, which had been founded by his uncle and father in 1918. Duncan Coffee's early brands, notably Admiration and Bright & Early, had become grocery staples in Texas and surrounding states. Duncan rose steadily through the ranks and attained the presidency in 1958. Under his leadership, the company expanded into the production of instant coffee—a new and popular beverage—by acquiring plants in New Jersey and Pennsylvania. Duncan also acquired several regional brands of ground coffee, including Butternut Foods of Nebraska and Fleetwood Coffee of Tennessee. He developed Maryland Club Coffee, which was marketed as a premier, upscale blend rivaling Maxwell House.

== The Coca-Cola Company ==
On May 8, 1964, Duncan Coffee merged with the Coca-Cola Company, and Duncan joined the Coke board of directors. He ran the newly formed Coca-Cola Foods Division, which included the coffee and citrus (Minute Maid) divisions of Coke. Three years later the company dispatched him to London to serve as chairman of Coca-Cola Europe. There Duncan supervised the operation and expansion of almost 300 Coca-Cola bottling plants throughout Europe and Asia, including ones in Eastern Europe, Southwest Asia, and North Africa. The first Eastern Europe introduction into Bulgaria made the Coca-Cola Company the first U.S. consumer marketing company to penetrate the Iron Curtain.

In 1970, Duncan returned to Atlanta and the following year became Coca-Cola's president. During his tenure from 1971 to 1974, the company enjoyed extensive growth. It also modernized its advertising. During this period Duncan bought the TE Ranch, southwest of Cody, Wyoming—a working cattle ranch established in 1895 by William F. "Buffalo Bill" Cody, from Coca-Cola's R. W. Woodruff. In 1974, Duncan left Coca-Cola to head back to Houston, where he became the chairman of both Rotan Mosle Financial Corp. and Robertson Distribution Systems.

== Carter administration ==
Charles Kirbo, an advisor to Jimmy Carter, recommended Duncan to Carter for a position in his presidential administration. Carter nominated Duncan to be the Deputy Secretary of Defense. In the role, Duncan advocated to U.S. Congress to end the prohibition of women in combat. The Iranian Revolution occurred during his tenure, encompassing political changes that marked that nation's transformation from a monarchy under the pro-western Shah Mohammad Reza Pahlavi to a so-called republic under the Ayatollah Ruhollah Khomeini. Duncan's duties involved multiple trips to several countries, including Iran, some of which were undergoing considerable turmoil. Duncan's military advisor was a young colonel named Colin Powell, who considered Duncan a mentor and good friend.

In July 1979, President Carter nominated Duncan to succeed James Schlesinger as Secretary of Energy. The appointment drew some criticism, as Duncan had little experience in the oil business, but he developed the reputation of a strong manager. The experience strengthened Duncan's belief in conservation measures of all kinds, in addition to enhancing production. Duncan imposed quotas on oil imports, encouraged weatherization of homes, and obtained subsidies for gasohol, helping to mitigate the worst impacts of the energy shortage.

== Corporate and state service ==
Leaving Washington DC at the end of Carter's term, Charles Duncan again returned to Houston, in January 1981. There he founded—with his brother, John H. Duncan—Gulf Partners, a private investment firm. He also served on the boards of The Coca-Cola Company, J. P. Morgan Chase, Texas Eastern, American Express, United Technologies, and more. Duncan also served as Limited Partner of Houston NFL Holdings, LP and as treasurer and director of The Methodist Hospital. Additionally, he was a director of The Welch Foundation until October 2004. At the request of Texas Governor Mark White and billionaire politician Ross Perot, Duncan joined the Select Committee on Public Education, and the Texas State Board of Education. The board formulated the controversial "no pass no play" rule, requiring athletes to maintain passing grades in all academic classes.

== Rice University ==
Throughout his career, Duncan repeatedly served as a trustee on the Board of Governors of Rice University. From 1982 to 1996, he served as chairman of Rice's board. He twice led the search for a university president, lobbied for the recruitment of international students, and helped establish the James A. Baker III Institute for Public Policy, a nonpartisan think-tank. When Duncan retired from the Rice board, the school named its new computational engineering building Anne and Charles Duncan Hall in honor of him and his wife in 1996. In 2007 the couple marked their fiftieth wedding anniversary in June and then—in October—donated $30 million to Rice to establish Duncan College, the university's eleventh residential college and its first-ever all-green building. This was part of Rice's Vision for the Second Century, which included establishing new residential colleges to accommodate the need to expand the student body while keeping the characteristics that make Rice distinctive.

== Later projects ==
Duncan (in partnership with his son Charles W. Duncan III) latterly oversaw the diverse operations of Duncan Capital Management in Houston. Duncan also served on the board of trustees of the education non-profit Reasoning Mind.

== Personal life ==
Duncan and his wife, Anne (née Smith), had two children.

Duncan died at his home in Houston on October 18, 2022, from complications of a fall, at age 96.

Political offices
| Preceded by Bill Clements | United States Deputy Secretary of Defense; 1977–1979 | Succeeded by W. Graham Claytor Jr. |
| Preceded by James R. Schlesinger | United States Secretary of Energy; 1979–1981 | Succeeded by James B. Edwards |
