= 1972 Texas Attorney General election =

1972 Texas Attorney General primary election
- May 6, 1972

Nominee	John Hill	Crawford Martin
Party	Democratic	Democratic
Popular vote	999,573	897,921
Percentage	50.1%	45.0%
Attorney General before election
Crawford Martin
Democratic
Elected Attorney General
John Hill
Democratic

The 1972 Texas Attorney General election took place on November 7, 1972, to elect the Texas Attorney General. Democratic nominee John Hill faced only minor opposition from Socialist Workers Party nominee Tom Kincaid.

== Democratic primary ==
The incumbent Attorney General Crawford Martin faced significant criticism for his handling of the Sharpstown Scandal that rocked the Texas political scene. He was upset in the primary as part of an anti-establishment wave which saw several incumbents fail to secure their renominations.

=== Candidates ===
==== Nominee ====
- John Luke Hill, lawyer, former Texas Secretary of State

==== Eliminated in primary ====
- Crawford C. Martin, incumbent Attorney General
- William Pate

=== Results ===
Democratic primary, May 6, 1972
Party	Candidate	Votes	%
Democratic	John Hill	999,573	50.1%
Democratic	Crawford Martin (incumbent)	897,921	45.0%
Democratic	William Pate	96,554	4.8%
Total votes		1,994,048	100.0%

== General election ==
=== Results ===
November 7, 1972 Texas Attorney General election
Party	Candidate	Votes	%
Democratic	John Hill	2,345,114	97.5%
Socialist Workers	Tom Kincaid	58,917	2.5%
Total votes		2,404,031	100.00%
Democratic hold			
