= Buddy Temple =

American politician

Railroad Commissioners of Texas
- In office January 2, 1981 – March 2, 1986
- Governor: Bill Clements; Mark White
- Preceded by: John H. Poerner
- Succeeded by: Clark Jobe

Member of the Texas House of Representatives from the 6th district
- In office January 9, 1973 – January 13, 1981
- Preceded by: Price Daniel Jr.
- Succeeded by: Oscar Brookshire

Personal details
- Born: Arthur Temple III; January 26, 1942 Texarkana, Arkansas, U.S.
- Died: April 14, 2015 (aged 73) Lufkin, Texas, U.S.
- Resting place: Temple Family Cemetery; Diboll, Texas
- Party: Democratic
- Spouse(s): April Clover Temple (m. 1962, divorced) Ellen Clarke Temple (m. 1970)
- Children: 3
- Education: Lawrenceville School; University of Texas at Austin
- Occupation: Businessman

Military service
- Allegiance: United States
- Branch/service: United States Army
- Years of service: 1961–1963
- Battles/wars: Vietnam War

Arthur "Buddy" Temple III (January 26, 1942 – April 14, 2015) was a businessman from Lufkin, Texas, who served as a Democrat in the Texas House of Representatives and on the Texas Railroad Commission. He failed in a bid for his party's gubernatorial nomination in 1982.

== Early life and education ==
Temple was born to the wealthy lumberman Arthur Temple Jr. (1920–2006), and the former Mary MacQuiston (born 1919) in Texarkana, Arkansas. He was reared in Lufkin, the seat of Angelina County in East Texas. In 1960, Temple graduated from the Lawrenceville School, a private boarding school in Lawrenceville near Princeton, New Jersey. He then briefly attended the University of Texas at Austin from 1960 to 1961, when he joined the U.S. Army, in which he remained until 1963. He worked in various businesses, including his family-owned Temple Industries from 1964 to 1966, when he ran Exeter Investment Company as Vice-President, President, and chairman from 1968 to 1982, and, again, from 1986 to 2002.

== Political career ==
In 1966, he was elected to the school board in Diboll in Angelina County. In 1972, he was elected to the District 6 seat in the Texas House and served from 1973 to 1981 from Angelina, Newton, Shelby, and San Augustine counties. Representative Temple co-sponsored the 1973 State Code of Ethics, with financial disclosure for elected and appointed officials, an issue highlighted by the Sharpstown banking scandal of 1971.

He was elected to the Railroad Commission in 1980 and was named chairman from 1985 to 1986. Temple and Texas Land Commissioner Bob Armstrong lost the gubernatorial nomination in 1982 to Mark Wells White, then Attorney General of Texas, who then unseated the Republican incumbent Bill Clements of Dallas.

Temple was a member of the board of directors of Temple-Inland, Inc., the chairman of the board of First Bank & Trust, East Texas, and board chairman of the T.L.L. Temple Foundation. He was a past chairman of the advisory board of the Caesar Kleberg Wildlife Research Institute.

== Personal life ==
In 1962, Temple married the former April Clover; the couple had one child, Whitney Sage Temple (born 1966). In 1970, he wed the former Ellen Clarke Hurst, and they have two children, Susan Helen Temple (born 1971), and Hannah Lea Temple (born 1972). Mrs. Temple has from a previous marriage a son, John Hurst (born 1967). Ellen Temple, a former educator and free-lance writer, was a regent of the University of Texas System under the administration of former Governor Ann Richards. Her business was the Ellen C. Temple Publishing, Inc., of Lufkin.

In 1992, Buddy and Ellen Temple purchased a ranch near Freer in Duval County east of Laredo, Texas. On April 14, 2015 at 5:30 pm, Temple died at the age of 73 in Lufkin. He had a long battle with cancer.

Political offices
Preceded by John H. Poerner	Texas Railroad Commissioner; 1981–1986	Succeeded by Clark Jobe
Preceded by Price Daniel Jr. (District then in Liberty County)	Texas State Representative from District 6 (Angelina, Newton, Shelby, and San Augustine counties); 1973–1981	Succeeded by Oscar Brookshire
