= 1974 Texas Attorney General election =

- November 5, 1974

Nominee	John Hill	Tom Cole
Party	Democratic	Republican
Popular vote	1,170,253	379,108
Percentage	74.1%	24.0%
Attorney General before election
John Hill
Democratic
Elected Attorney General
John Hill
Democratic

The 1974 Texas Attorney General election took place on November 5, 1974, to elect the Texas Attorney General. Incumbent Democratic John Hill was re-elected defeating Republican nominee Tom Cole. This was the first election after a constitutional amendment lenghtened the term of office to four years.

== Democratic primary ==
The incumbent Attorney General John Hill was unopposed in the primary.

=== Candidates ===
==== Nominee ====
- John Luke Hill, incumbent Attorney General

=== Results ===
Democratic primary, May 4, 1974
Party	Candidate	Votes	%
Democratic	John Hill (incumbent)	1,075,960	100.0%
Total votes		1,075,960	100.0%

== Republican primary ==
Tom Cole ran unopposed in the primary.

== General election ==
=== Results ===
November 7, 1978 Texas Attorney General election
Party	Candidate	Votes	%
Democratic	John Hill (incumbent)	1,170,253	74.07%
Republican	Tom Cole	379,108	23.90%
Socialist Workers	Pedro Vasquez	30,577	1.94%
Total votes		1,579,938	100.00%
Democratic hold			
