= 1978 Texas Attorney General election =

- November 7, 1978
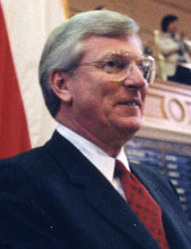

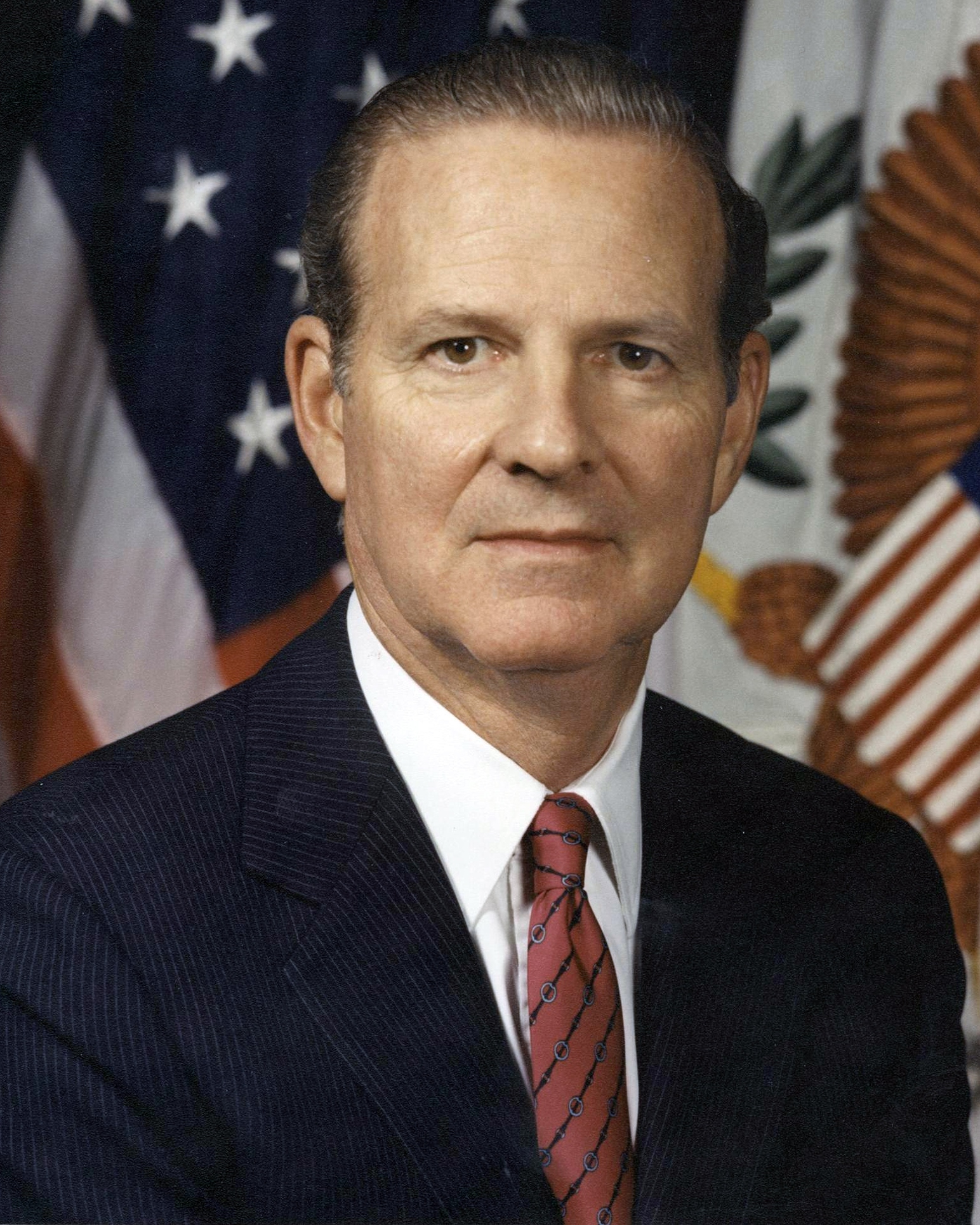
Nominee	Mark White	James Baker
Party	Democratic	Republican
Popular vote	1,249,846	999,431
Percentage	55.1%	44.1%
- County results White: 40–50% 50–60% 60–70% 70–80% 80–90% Baker: 50–60% 60–70%
Attorney General before election
John Hill
Democratic
Elected Attorney General
Mark White
Democratic

The 1978 Texas Attorney General election took place on November 7, 1978, to elect the Texas Attorney General. Democratic nominee Mark White defeated Republican nominee James Baker.

== Democratic primary ==
The incumbent Attorney General John Hill chose to challenge the incumbent governor Dolph Briscoe in the Democratic gubernatorial primary instead of running for reelection.

=== Candidates ===
==== Nominee ====
- Mark Wells White Jr., Texas Secretary of State, former assistant attorney general of Texas

==== Eliminated in primary ====
- Marion Price Daniel Jr., former Speaker of the Texas House of Representatives, President of the 1974 Texas Constitutional Convention, son of former governor Price Daniel

=== Results ===
Democratic primary, May 6, 1978
Party	Candidate	Votes	%
Democratic	Mark White	850,979	52.2%
Democratic	Price Daniel Jr.	778,889	47.8%
Total votes		1,629,868	100.0%

== Republican primary ==
=== Candidates ===
==== Nominee ====
- James Addison Baker III, lawyer, campaign chairman for Gerald Ford's 1976 presidential campaign, former under secretary of commerce under Rogers Morton

=== Results ===
Republican primary, May 6, 1978
Party	Candidate	Votes	%
Republican	James Baker	131,962	100.0%
Total votes		131,962	100.0%

== General election ==
=== Results ===
November 7, 1978 Texas Attorney General election
Party	Candidate	Votes	%
Democratic	Mark White	1,249,846	55.1%
Republican	James Baker	999,431	44.1%
Socialist Workers	Agnes Chapa	17,974	0.8%
Total votes		2,267,251	100.00%
Democratic hold			
