= Thomas R. Phillips =

American judge

Chief Justice of the Supreme Court of Texas
- In office January 4, 1988 – September 3, 2004
- Appointed by: Bill Clements
- Preceded by: John Luke Hill, Jr.
- Succeeded by: Wallace B. Jefferson

Personal details
- Born: Thomas Royal Phillips; October 23, 1949 (age 77) Dallas, Texas
- Party: Republican
- Spouse: Marilyn Bracewell Phillips
- Children: 1
- Education: Baylor University (BA); Harvard Law School (JD)
- Occupation: Attorney former Jurist

Thomas Royal Phillips (born October 23, 1949) is an American attorney and former judge who served from 1988 to 2004 as Chief Justice of the Supreme Court of Texas. He was appointed by Governor Bill Clements in November 1987, becoming the youngest Chief Justice since Texan statehood, and is the longest serving Chief Justice in the state's history. As of 2026, he is part of the Baker Botts law firm in Austin, Texas.

== Early life and education ==
Phillips was born on October 3, 1949 in Dallas. He attended and graduated from Woodrow Wilson High School in 1968 and enrolled at Baylor University, graduting in 1971 with a Bachelor of Arts. He graduated from Harvard Law School with a Juris Doctor in 1974. He holds honorary degrees from Texas Tech University and St. Mary's University.

== Career ==
=== District Court ===
Governor Bill Clements appointed him to the 280th District Court within Harris County in 1981. He held the position for 8 years, resigning it upon his appointment to the Texas Supreme Court.

=== Chief Justice ===
Clements, in his second non-consecutive term as Governor, appointed Phillips to the vacant position of Chief Justice of the Texas Supreme Court in November 1987.

Phillips took office less than a month after CBS' 60 Minutes ran a highly publicized story, entitled "Justice for Sale?", which won widespread attention for its blistering critique of Texas's choice to elect judges by political party without campaign contribution limits. The broadcast alleged improperly close ties between several of the justices and their largest donors, who were among the state's most successful personal injury trial lawyers.

In campaigns that received national attention in 1988, Phillips and two other candidates running as Republicans won election by imposing voluntary limits on the size of campaign contributions. By winning, they joined Railroad Commissioner Kent Hance as the first Republican elected to statewide office since Reconstruction. Phillips, after serving the two years remaining on the term of his predecessor, Chief Justice John L. Hill, was elected to a full term in 1990. In each race he defeated one of his Democratic colleagues on the Court, Ted Z. Robertson in 1988 and Oscar H. Mauzy in 1990, who defended Texas's partisan judicial election system and declined to impose campaign contribution caps. Throughout his tenure, Phillips advocated for a non-partisan appointment-retention election method of choosing Texas judges. He was ultimately unsuccessful, like other Texas chief justices before and since. Both the Legislature and the Supreme Court imposed restrictions on the amount, timing and source of campaign contributions to judges during his tenure. He won re-election in 1996 and 2002, and resigned in 2004.

Phillips served as President of the Conference of Chief Justices in 1997-1998, an Adviser of the Federal Judicial Code Project of the American Law Institute, and a member of the Federal-State Relations Committee of the Judicial Conference of the United States, the Carter-Baker Commission on Federal Election Reform, the Texas Historical Commission, and the NCAA Committee on Infractions. He is a member of the Federalist Society.

== Legacy ==
Phillips retired from the court in 2004 to teach and return to the private sector. He joined Baker Botts's Dallas office in 2005, and remains there as of 2026. In private practice, Phillips primarily engaged in appellate matters, generally in civil matters, although he was a member of the legal team that convinced the Texas Court of Criminal Appeals to quash the indictment against Governor Rick Perry.

During the 2026 Texas elections, Phillips endorsed Democrats Nathan Johnson and James Talarico for Attorney General and U.S. Senate, respectively.

== Recognition ==
- Burton Award for Professionalism in Law (2004)
- Carrico Award by National Center for State Courts' for Judicial Innovation (2005)
- Justice Award by American Judicature Society (2007)
- Outstanding Mentor Award by Texas Young Lawyers Association (2010)
- "Pro Texana" Meritorious Achievement Award by Baylor University (2013)

Legal offices
Preceded by John L. Hill, Jr.	Chief Justice of the Texas Supreme Court; 1988–2004	Succeeded by Wallace B. Jefferson
