= 1986 Texas gubernatorial election =

- November 4, 1986
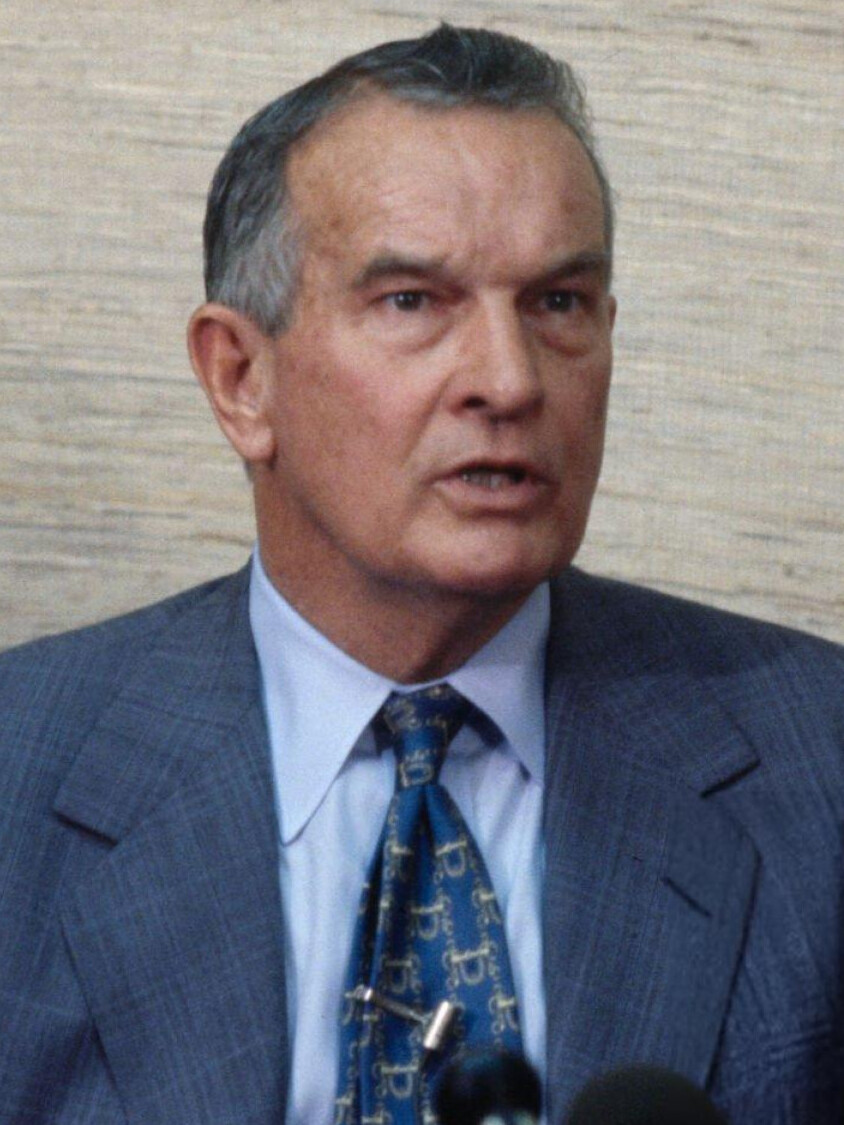

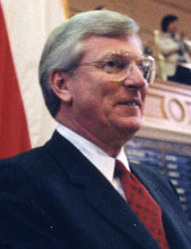
Nominee	Bill Clements	Mark White
Party	Republican	Democratic
Popular vote	1,813,779	1,584,515
Percentage	52.70%	46.04%
- County results Clements: 40–50% 50–60% 60–70% 70–80% 80–90% White: 40–50% 50–60% 60–70% 70–80%
Governor before election
Mark White
Democratic
Elected Governor
Bill Clements
Republican

The 1986 Texas gubernatorial election was held on November 4, 1986, to elect the governor of Texas. The election was a rematch of the 1982 election, as incumbent Democratic governor Mark White ran for reelection against former Republican governor Bill Clements. Clements was elected to a second, non-consecutive term as governor, winning 53% of the vote to White's 46%. As of 2026, this is the last time Grimes and Chambers counties have voted for the Democratic nominee for governor.

== Democratic primary ==
=== Candidates ===
- Sheila Bilyeu, Corpus Christie school guidance counselor
- Andrew C. Briscoe III, Dallas businessman
- A. Don Crowder, Dallas attorney
- Bobby Locke, Sant Antonio contractor
- Ron Slover, Amarillo oilman
- Mark White, incumbent governor

=== Results ===
Democratic primary results
Party	Candidate	Votes	%
Democratic	Mark White (incumbent)	589,536	53.76%
Democratic	Andrew C. Briscoe III	248,850	22.69%
Democratic	A. Don Crowder	120,999	11.03%
Democratic	Robert "Star" Locke	58,936	5.38%
Democratic	Sheila Bilyeu	39,370	3.59%
Democratic	Ron Slover	38,861	3.54%
Total votes		1,096,552	100.00%

== Republican primary ==
=== Candidates ===
- Bill Clements, former governor (1979–1983)
- Kent Hance, former Democratic U.S. representative from Lubbock
- Tom Loeffler, U.S. representative from Hunt

=== Results ===
Republican primary results
Party	Candidate	Votes	%
Republican	Bill Clements	318,808	58.53%
Republican	Tom Loeffler	117,673	21.60%
Republican	Kent Hance	108,238	19.87%
Total votes		554,719	100.00%

== Campaign ==
=== White ===
Incumbent Mark White was inaugurated as Texas' 43rd governor on January 18, 1983, having been elected to the governorship in the 1982 elections. He lost his re-election bid in 1986. He had been elected to statewide office as the 46th Texas Attorney General in 1978 and served in Governor Dolph Briscoe's administration as Texas Secretary of State, an appointed position, from 1973 until his resignation in 1977.

Under White's administration, he focused his energies on education reform (including no pass/no play) and utility rate regulation. He also concentrated on economic development and the appointment of more minorities to positions on his staff and in the government. The Texas Sesquicentennial occurred in 1986, and the governor attended and hosted a number of events. The Goddess of Liberty was restored and planning for Capitol restoration began during White's term in office.

However, White's approval ratings began to slide downhill as a result of the enactment of "No Pass No Play" in 1984, which made students ineligible for all extracurricular activities for six weeks if they fail to score at least 70 in any course during the previous six weeks. . Critics of the law including DeKalb Mayor Billy Eubanks said, "I have real mixed emotions about it", stating that the law had robbed his small town team of its shot at a district championship. "I hate to see those kids lose. It's kind of a losing situation when you're trying to teach team concepts, school spirit and all that. "Those kids that failed lost. Those kids that didn't fail, they lost, too, because they had to make up for some kids being out. The coaches lost. The community lost. Eubanks continued, "I don't object to the no-pass, no-play rule. I object to the extent and the punishment aspect of it. When you only have about 28 kids, total, playing football, that hurts."

In his 1985 State of the State address, White justified the controversial law by stating "well-educated minds are the oil and gas of this state's future." Backed by big business, the first-term Democrat staked his hopes on reelection in 1986 on the belief that Texans, by and large, will support a new emphasis on academics over sports. He also pushed through the education reform package which took effect in 1985, and he launched a $500,000 statewide television ad campaign to promote the no-pass, no-play law. But as the football season reached its climax, growing numbers of angry high school coaches indicated in Dallas that they would support an unprecedented campaign to unseat White in the 1986 gubernatorial elections.

=== Clements ===
Bill Clements was elected to a second non-consecutive term as governor in 1986; having been elected in 1978 before losing reelection to White in 1982. Since losing in 1982, Clements made it pretty clear that he wanted to take back the governorship in 1986. University of Houston political science professor Richard Murray mentioned that the White-Clements rematch of 1986 like this: "Here you've got two guys who have been governor going at it. It should make for an interesting election."

In July 1985, Clements announced his candidacy to seek the governorship a third time. When asked why he wanted to avenge his 1982 loss, Clements said on the backlash against White's administration: "There's a strong negative feeling out there against the present administration that is even stronger than I had thought." During the 1986 campaign, Clements and White staged the most expensive political race in state history, spending more than $25 million between them. The campaign was even more bitter and vicious than in 1982.

He was endorsed by President Ronald Reagan, then-vice president George H. W. Bush, U.S. senator Phil Gramm (R-TX), former U.S. senator John Tower, and former Democratic governors Preston Smith and Price Daniel.

The Clements campaign also found evidence to use against White such as the purchase of a state-owned Japanese jet, which heavily polled in Clements' favor. He, along with many Texans, blamed White for raising both the sales and incomes taxes, which the Legislature actually raised months before the election. Unemployment often exceeded 10%. Dallas and Houston led the nation in office vacancies, and corporate bankruptcies increasingly infected the business community. Among those involved in Clements' campaign included Karl Rove as his campaign manager and Reggie Bashur as his press secretary; he also began phoning his previous supporters, many of whom had already committed to other candidates, including Jim Francis; appointments secretary Tobin Armstrong; Bum Bright, an A&M regent appointed by Clements; and pollster Lance Tarrance.

=== Debate ===
Although White started out trailing by double digits (30 points according to one polling firm), he turned the race into a very tight one. The two rival camps agreed to a televised debate, which occurred on October 6, 1986, in Houston. Reggie Bashur recalls that at the debate, the two candidates did not want to shake hands, but did so for the press: "And so they finally extended hands. Clements says, 'Well, Mark, your cartridge is dry', and White looked at Clements and said, 'Bill, you ready for business?.'

Bashur also recalled that he said to Clements during the debate prep: "Why don't we get under White's skin? Let's get him off stride. When you get any kind of question about the budget, segue into that we've got to live within our means and cut waste." I suggested that Clements say, "To cut waste, I'll sell the jet." I suggested [we] itemize what is in the jet. You could say, "And I'll sell that $500 gold-plated ashtray, and I'll sell that $35,000 carpet, and I'll sell"-fifteen items. I wrote them all out. Clements takes that piece of paper and sticks it in his pocket, and that's the last I hear about it."

Bashur was pleased when this debate preparation paid a big dividend for Clements. The first question to Clements was about balancing the budget by cutting waste: "You could just see it click with Clements. He had a big smile on his face as he pulled the list out of the jacket, and he's got my piece of paper with the items. He doesn't just pick one or two; he reads all fifteen! White got beet red. Clements won the debate. White never got back on track."

== Videos ==
(1) Gubernatorial Debate on KPRC-TV NBC 2 Studios on October 6, 1986

(2) White Campaign Commercial from October 1, 1986

(3) White Campaign Commercials from October 28, 1986

(4) Clements Campaign Commercial

(5) White Campaign Commercial from September 12, 1986

(6) News Segments on the 1986 Texas Gubernatorial Election

(7) Governor White's speech at the Texas Democratic Party Convention from June 28, 1986

(8) Post-Debate TV Interviews from October 6, 1986

(9) White Campaign Commercial from February 13, 1986

(10) Utility Rates

(11) Clements for Governor Campaign Commercials Compilations from October 11, 1986

== Results ==
General election results
Party	Candidate	Votes	%
Republican	Bill Clements	1,813,779	52.70%
Democratic	Mark White (incumbent)	1,584,515	46.04%
Libertarian	Theresa S. Doyle	42,496	1.24%
Independent	Charles Lee (write-in)	531	0.02%
Green	J. Muriel (write-in)	139	0.00%
Total votes		3,441,460	100.00%
Republican gain from Democratic			
