= Renee Knake Jefferson =

American law professor

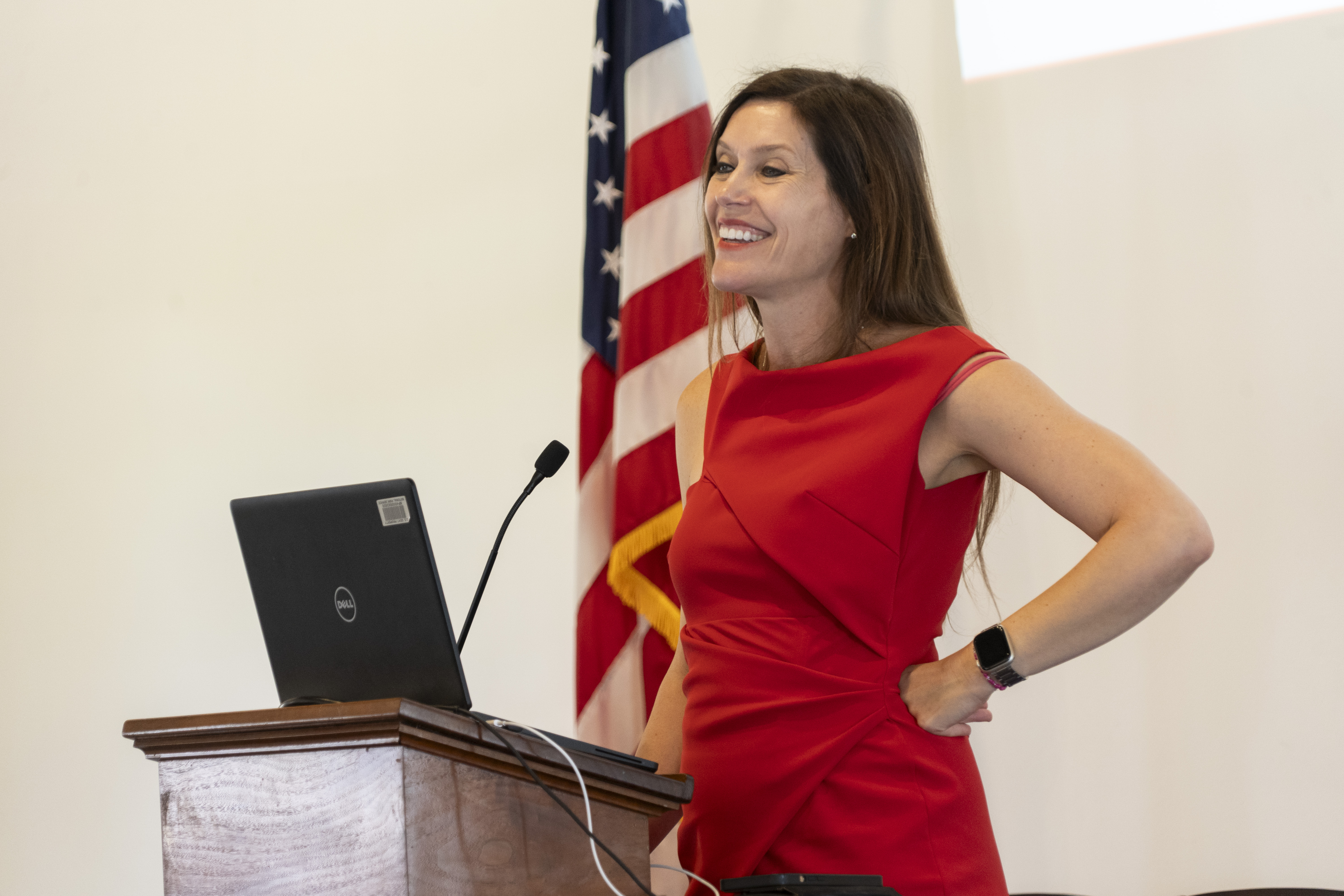

Member of the Michigan State University Board of Trustees
- Incumbent
- Assumed office December 4, 2019
- Preceded by: Nancy Schlichting

Personal details
- Born: October 29, 1973 (age 52) Springfield, Missouri, U.S.
- Party: Democratic
- Spouse: Wallace B. Jefferson
- Education: North Park University (BA); University of Chicago (JD)
- Website: Official website

Renee Knake Jefferson is an American law professor. She holds the Joanne and Larry Doherty Chair in Legal Ethics at the University of Houston Law Center and is a member of the Board of Trustees at Michigan State University. She is the author of four books and teaches legal ethics, constitutional law, and leadership among other topics. She is an elected member of the American Law Institute.

== Early life and education ==
Jefferson grew up in the Midwest, living in Kansas, Minnesota, and Missouri, where she was born. She received her JD from the University of Chicago Law School.

== Career ==
In her early legal career, Jefferson was in private practice at the law firms Mayer Brown and Hunton & Williams, and also worked as an attorney for Charlottesville, Virginia. She moved on to teach at Michigan State University College of Law in 2006 where she also achieved tenure. Her teaching included legal ethics as well as business school and honors college classes. In 2011, she co-founded the ReInvent Law Laboratory for Law, Technology, Innovation and Entrepreneurship, an organization that helped students find opportunities outside of the traditional law areas.

Jefferson became the Joanne and Larry Doherty Chair in Legal Ethics at the University of Houston in 2016. During the first half of 2019, Jefferson held the Fulbright Distinguished Chair in Entrepreneurship and Innovation at Royal Melbourne Institute of Technology University in Australia. She was appointed to the Michigan State University Board of Trustees by Governor Gretchen Whitmer in December 2019, replacing Nancy Schlichting who resigned the same year.

Jefferson is the author of four books, including Shortlisted: Women in the Shadows of the Supreme Court published by New York University Press in 2020, and numerous academic articles.

== Bibliography ==
- 2020, Shortlisted: Women in the Shadows of the Supreme Court
- 2020, Professional Responsibility: A Contemporary Approach
- 2019, Gender, Power, Law & Leadership
- 2018, Legal Ethics for the Real World: Building Skills Through Case Study

== Personal life ==
Jefferson married retired Texas Supreme Court Justice Wallace B. Jefferson on July 4, 2020, in Michigan. The couple share the same birthdays as Richard and Mildred Loving, whose United States Supreme Court case established the right of interracial marriage.
