= Wallace B. Jefferson =

American judge (born 1963)

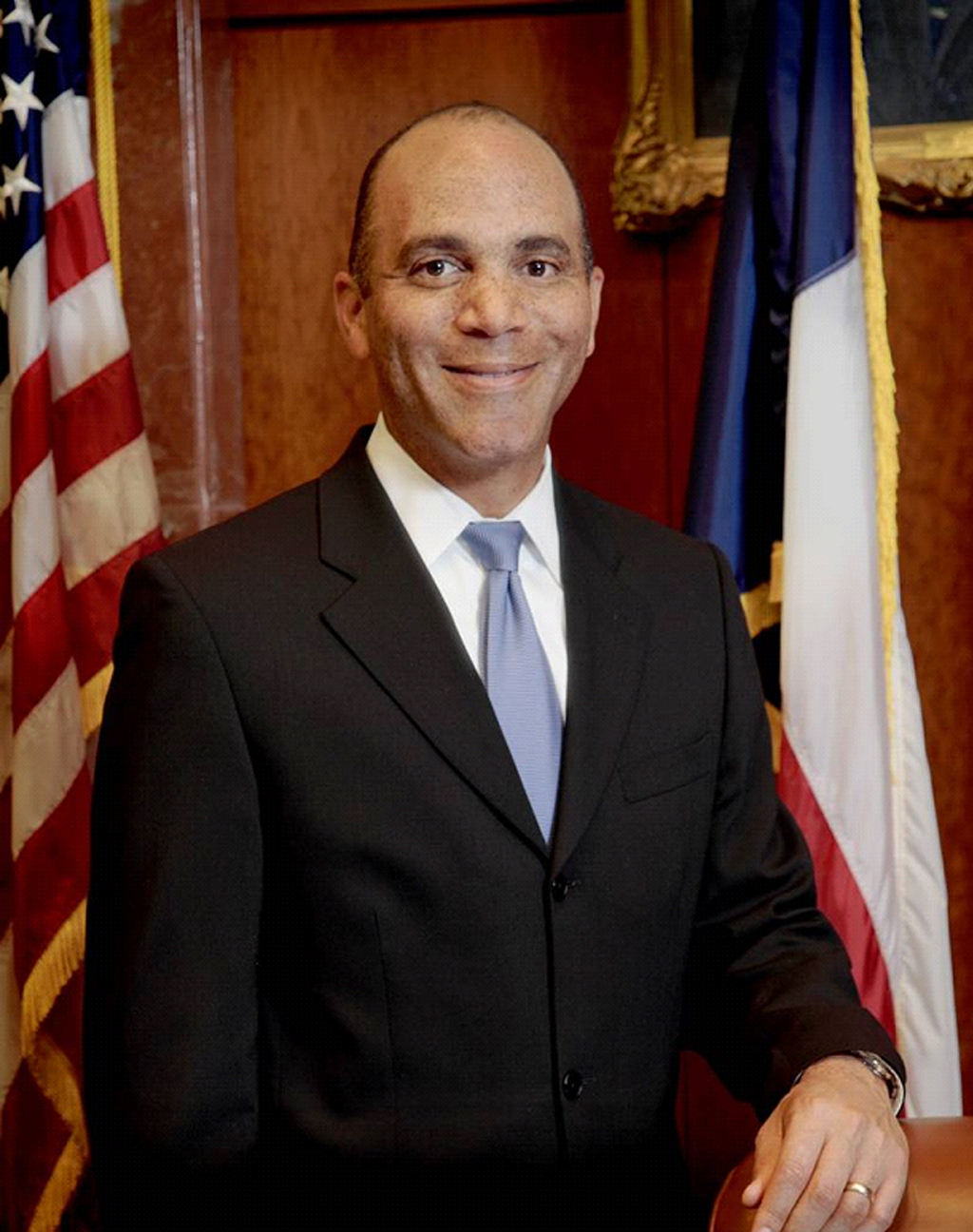

Chief Justice of the Supreme Court of Texas
- In office September 20, 2004 – October 1, 2013
- Appointed by: Rick Perry
- Preceded by: Thomas R. Phillips
- Succeeded by: Nathan Hecht

Justice of the Supreme Court of Texas
- In office April 18, 2001 – September 20, 2004
- Appointed by: Rick Perry
- Preceded by: Alberto Gonzales
- Succeeded by: David M. Medina

Personal details
- Born: July 22, 1963 (age 63)
- Party: Republican
- Spouse(s): Rhonda Jefferson (divorced) Renee Knake Jefferson (m. 2020)
- Children: 3
- Education: Michigan State University (BA); University of Texas at Austin (JD)

Wallace Bernard Jefferson (born July 22, 1963) is an American lawyer who served as the chief justice of the Supreme Court of Texas from 2004 until October 1, 2013. In October 2013, he joined the law firm Alexander Dubose & Jefferson LLP as a name partner and now practices appellate law.

He sits on the council of the American Law Institute and became its treasurer in May 2014, and became its president in 2026. A member of the Republican Party, Jefferson was the first African American justice to serve on the Texas Supreme Court, the state's court of last resort for civil and juvenile appeals.

== Early life and education ==
Jefferson is a graduate of John Jay High School in San Antonio, Texas, then James Madison College at Michigan State University. He later received his Juris Doctor from the University of Texas School of Law.

== Historic judicial appointments and elections ==
In 2001, then Texas Governor Rick Perry initially appointed Jefferson to become the first African American member of the Texas Supreme Court. Jefferson was appointed on March 14, 2001, to fill the vacancy left by Alberto R. Gonzales, who resigned to become White House counsel to U.S. President George W. Bush.

In November 2002, Jefferson stood for election to retain the position to which he had been appointed, and defeated William E. Moody with 56.76% of the vote. He became, together with Dale Wainwright, one of the two first African American Texans ever elected to that court.

Before Jefferson could complete his new term as associate justice, however, he was again promoted. On September 20, 2004, Governor Rick Perry selected Jefferson to succeed chief justice Thomas R. Phillips, who had resigned from the court a few weeks earlier, after nearly seventeen years as chief.

Jefferson was elected to the position of Chief Justice in November 2006, to serve out the remainder of Phillips's unexpired term, and was then reelected to a full six-year term. He became the first African American chief justice of that court.

In the 2008 general election contest, Jefferson defeated his Democratic Challenger, Dallas District Court Judge Jim Jordan, with 53% of the vote.

Jefferson resigned in 2013 before his six-year term of office expired. Governor Rick Perry then named long-term associate justice Nathan Hecht of Dallas to succeed Jefferson, and appointed Jeff Brown from Houston to fill the vacancy resulting from Hecht's promotion to the position of chief.

Jefferson is now in private practice and occasionally appears before his former colleagues on petitions for review, briefs, or for oral argument.

== Notable activities ==
Jefferson was elected to the American Law Institute (the ALI) in 2001, and was elected to the ALI council in 2011. In May 2014, he was named treasurer of ALI. He also serves as an adviser on the Restatement Third, the law of consumer contracts. Jefferson also chairs the ALI's regional advisory group, covering Louisiana, Mississippi, Oklahoma and Texas. He was elected president of ALI in 2026.

During his time on the bench, Jefferson served as president of the Conference of Chief Justices, an association of chief justices from the fifty states and U.S. territories.

In 2015, Texas Governor Greg Abbott appointed Jefferson to the Texas Historical Commission.

Before he became a judge, Jefferson successfully argued two cases before the United States Supreme Court: Board of Commissioners of Bryan County, Oklahoma v. Brown, 520 U.S. 397 (1997), and Gebser v. Lago Vista Independent School District, 524 U.S. 274 (1998).

== Honors and awards ==
In 2013, Jefferson was the recipient of the Texas Exes' Distinguished Alumnus Award.

Jefferson is a 1981 graduate of John Jay High School in Northside ISD school district in San Antonio, which paid tribute to his success and rise from humble roots by naming Wallace B. Jefferson Middle School in his honor. The school opened August 27, 2007, and refers to the former jurist as "our namesake."

== Personal life ==
Jefferson has three sons. Jefferson married law professor Renee Knake Jefferson on July 4, 2020, in Michigan. Michigan Governor Gretchen Whitmer conducted the nuptials.

== Possible U.S. Supreme Court nomination ==
Jefferson was mentioned as a possible supreme court nominee by Hillary Clinton's campaign staff.

== See also ==
- List of African-American jurists

Legal offices
Preceded by Thomas R. Phillips	Chief Justice of the Texas Supreme Court; 2004–2013	Succeeded by Nathan Hecht
Preceded by Alberto R. Gonzalez	Texas Supreme Court Justice, Place 4; 2001–2004	Succeeded by David M. Medina
