= T E Ranch Headquarters =

Historic house in Wyoming, United States

- U.S. National Register of Historic Places
- Location within Wyoming Location within the United States
- Location: Park County, Wyoming, USA
- Nearest city: Cody, Wyoming
- Coordinates: 44°16′53″N 109°29′30″W
- NRHP reference No.: 73001939
- Added to NRHP: April 03, 1973

The T E Ranch Headquarters, near Cody, Wyoming, is a log ranch house that belonged to buffalo hunter and entertainer Buffalo Bill Cody (1846–1917). The house may have originally been built by homesteader Bob Burns prior to 1895, when Cody acquired the ranch. Cody expanded the ranch to about eight thousand acres (32 km^{2}), using the T E brand for his thousand head of cattle.

The house faces the Shoshone River and is a little more than 60 feet (18 m) long by about 20 feet (6.1 m) wide. Short extensions exist on the southeast and northwest sides. With its broad, gently sloping roof, it is an archetypal ranch house. Two cupolas have been built on the roof to provide light and ventilation. The house has been renovated within without substantial loss of character. The grounds include indigenous plants that have been transplanted to the house's river-bottom surroundings, a place where they would not normally exist, but which are in keeping with the headquarters of a large ranch. An unusual feature is the collection of antlers and horns placed on the grounds.

Cody's TE Ranch was the center of his efforts to irrigate more than 100,000 acres (40,000 ha) of semi-arid land under the Carey Act of 1894. Cody's manager was George T. Beck, who began what became known as the Shoshone Reclamation Project, which culminated in the construction of Buffalo Bill Dam. However, the project was beyond the scope of Cody's finances, and he signed the water rights to the land back to the State of Wyoming in 1904. The TE's ranch lands bordered on the Yellowstone Timberland Reserve, established in 1891, which offered summer range grazing. Cody acquired neighboring properties, then cut back as financial troubles grew. At the time of Cody's death in 1917 the TE comprised about 4,000 acres (1,600 ha) and 500 head of cattle. By 1916 Cody was considering the use of the TE as a dude ranch, but died before carrying out his plan.

After Cody's death the ranch passed to Philadelphian Stanley Groves. Groves continued the ranching operation but also used the TE as a family retreat, building cabins and a log octagonal library/game house. After Groves' death in 1930 the property was sold to Paul Patton of Kansas City, an associate of Tom Pendergast who was forced to sell when Pendergast's political organization in Kansas City came under investigation. The next buyer was Robert W. Woodruff, then-president and later board chairman of the Coca Cola Company. The property passed from Woodruff in 1972 to another Coca Cola executive, Charles Duncan.
