= Duncan Coffee Company =

American coffee roasting and distributing company

- Type: privately held company
- Industry: Coffee
- Founded: 1918; 108 years ago
- Founder: Herschel Duncan
- Headquarters: Houston, Texas, United States
- Products: Roasted coffee beans, ground coffee
- Website: duncancoffee.com

The Duncan Coffee Company is an American coffee roasting and distributing company founded in 1918. While the company distributes brands under its own name, it also supplies coffee under other notable brands such as Shipley Do-Nuts and Bright and Early Coffee.

== History ==
In 1901, J.W. O'Neal founded a coffee shop in Nashville, Tennessee. Along with the shop's co-founders, the shop convinced the owners of the historic Maxwell House Hotel to use their coffee, forming Maxwell House Coffee.

O'Neal's nephew, Herschel Duncan, developed the blend for the Maryland Club, which became one of the better known brands of the time and formed the Duncan Coffee Company. Following Duncan's death, the company was sold. The company would immediately create the brands of Admiration Coffee and Bright and Early Coffee, which is still around today.

In 1957, United States Deputy Secretary of Defense and Secretary of Energy, Charles Duncan Jr., put together a group to buy back the company from the failing owners. The Coca-Cola Company would then acquire the growing company. The company would eventually be sold to Procter & Gamble. The company returned to family ownership when Herschel Mills Duncan IV bought the company.

== Notable Brands ==
- Bright and Early Coffee
- Dilmah Tea (USA Only)
- Shipley Do-Nuts
