= 1968 Texas Attorney General election =

- November 5, 1968

Nominee	Crawford Martin	Sproesser Wynn
Party	Democratic	Republican
Popular vote	1,950,193	807,499
Percentage	70.7%	29.3%
Attorney General before election
Crawford Martin
Democratic
Elected Attorney General
Crawford Martin
Democratic

The 1968 Texas Attorney General election took place on November 5, 1968, to elect the Texas Attorney General. Incumbent Democrat Crawford Martin was reelected defeating Republican nominee Sproesser Wynn.

== Democratic primary ==
Crawford Martin, the incumbent attorney general, ran unopposed in the primary.

=== Results ===
Democratic primary
Party	Candidate	Votes	%
Democratic	Crawford Martin (incumbent)	1,184,765	100.0%
Total votes		1,184,765	100.0%

== Republican primary ==
Sproesser Wynn ran unopposed in the primary.

=== Results ===
Republican primary
Party	Candidate	Votes	%
Republican	Sproesser Wynn	94,861	100.0%
Total votes		94,861	100.0%

== General election ==
=== Results ===
November 5, 1968 Texas Attorney General election
Party	Candidate	Votes	%
Democratic	Crawford Martin (incumbent)	1,950,193	70.7%
Republican	Sproesser Wynn	807,499	29.3%
Total votes		2,757,692	100.00%
Democratic hold			
