= 1966 Texas Attorney General election =

- November 8, 1966

Nominee	Crawford Martin	Robb Stewart
Party	Democratic	Republican
Popular vote	980,148	415,803
Percentage	69.6%	29.5%
Attorney General before election
Waggoner Carr
Democratic
Elected Attorney General
Crawford Martin
Democratic

The 1966 Texas Attorney General election took place on November 8, 1966, to elect the Texas Attorney General. Democratic nominee Crawford Martin defeated Republican nominee Robb Stewart.

== Democratic primary ==
The incumbent Attorney General Waggoner Carr chose to run for the United States Senate instead of seeking reelection.

=== Candidates ===
==== Nominee ====
- Crawford Martin, Texas Secretary of State, unsuccessful candidate for the Democratic nomination for lieutenant governor in 1962, former state senator, former mayor of Hillsboro

==== Eliminated in primary ====
- Franklin Spears
- Galloway Calhoun, state senator

=== Results ===
Democratic primary
Party	Candidate	Votes	%
Democratic	Crawford Martin	540,280	45.7%
Democratic	Franklin Spears	445,254	37.7%
Democratic	Galloway Calhoun	195,424	16.5%
Total votes		1,180,958	100.0%

Democratic primary runoff
Party	Candidate	Votes	%
Democratic	Crawford Martin	363,709	55.9%
Democratic	Franklin Spears	286,482	44.1%
Total votes		650,191	100.0%

== General election ==
=== Results ===
November 8, 1966 Texas Attorney General election
Party	Candidate	Votes	%
Democratic	Crawford Martin	980,148	69.6%
Republican	Robb Stewart	415,803	29.5%
Constitution	John Williams	11,793	0.8%
Total votes		1,407,744	100.00%
Democratic hold			
