= 1970 Texas Attorney General election =

- November 3, 1970

Nominee	Crawford Martin	Edward Yturri
Party	Democratic	Republican
Popular vote	1,614,149	599,185
Percentage	72.9%	27.1%
Attorney General before election
Crawford Martin
Democratic
Elected Attorney General
Crawford Martin
Democratic

The 1970 Texas Attorney General election took place on November 3, 1970, to elect the Texas Attorney General. Incumbent Democrat Crawford Martin was reelected to a third term by defeating Republican nominee Edward Yturri.

== Democratic primary ==
=== Candidates ===
==== Nominee ====
- Crawford Martin, incumbent attorney general

==== Eliminated in primary ====
- David Brown

=== Results ===
Democratic primary, May 6, 1978
Party	Candidate	Votes	%
Democratic	Crawford Martin (incumbent)	981,650	75.3%
Democratic	David Brown	321,219	24.7%
Total votes		1,302,869	100.0%

== Republican primary ==
=== Candidates ===
==== Nominee ====
- Edward Yturri

=== Results ===
Republican primary
Party	Candidate	Votes	%
Republican	Edward Yturri	94,528	100.0%
Total votes		94,528	100.0%

== General election ==
=== Results ===
November 3, 1970 Texas Attorney General election
Party	Candidate	Votes	%
Democratic	Crawford Martin (incumbent)	1,614,149	72.93%
Republican	Edward Yturri	599,185	27.07%
Total votes		2,213,334	100.00%
Democratic hold			
