= Crawford Martin =

American politician (1916–1972)

- Martin in 1970

44th Attorney General of Texas
- In office January 1, 1967 – December 29, 1972
- Governor: John Connally; Preston Smith
- Preceded by: Waggoner Carr
- Succeeded by: John Hill

68th Secretary of State of Texas
- In office January 15, 1963 – March 12, 1966
- Governor: John Connally
- Preceded by: P. Frank Lane
- Succeeded by: John Hill

President pro tempore of the Texas Senate
- In office January 11, 1955 – June 7, 1956
- Preceded by: Dorsey B. Hardeman
- Succeeded by: Neveille Colson

Member of the Texas Senate from the 12th district
- In office January 11, 1949 – January 8, 1963
- Preceded by: A. B. Crawford
- Succeeded by: J. P. Word

Mayor of Hillsboro, Texas
- In office 1947–1948

Personal details
- Born: Crawford Collins Martin; March 13, 1916 Hillsboro, Texas, U.S.
- Died: December 29, 1972 (aged 56) Austin, Texas, U.S.
- Resting place: Texas State Cemetery
- Party: Democratic
- Spouse: Margaret Ann Mash (m. 1941)
- Education: Hill College; University of Texas at Austin; Cumberland School of Law

Military service
- Allegiance: United States
- Branch/service: United States Coast Guard
- Battles/wars: World War II

Crawford Collins Martin (March 13, 1916 – December 29, 1972) was an American politician who served as the 68th secretary of state of Texas from 1963 to 1966 and as the 44th attorney general of Texas from 1967 until his death in 1972. A member of the Democratic Party, Martin previously represented the 12th district in the Texas Senate from 1949 to 1963.

== Early life ==
Martin was born to Will M. Martin and Daisy (Beavers) Martin at Hillsboro, Texas, on March 13, 1916. He was educated in the public schools, attended Hillsboro Junior College graduating in 1935. He graduated with a law degree from Cumberland University's law school (now the Cumberland Law School at Samford University) in Tennessee after attending the University of Texas at Austin, first. He was admitted to the Texas bar in 1939 and commenced the practice of law with his brother, William, in Hillsboro. Martin married Margaret Ann Mash in 1941. During World War II, Martin enlisted in the United States Coast Guard.

== Political career ==
=== Mayor and state senator ===
After the war, Martin was elected Mayor of Hillsboro in 1947 until 1948. In 1948, he was elected as a Democrat to the Texas Senate representing district 12, which his father had previously represented. The 12th district comprised all of the counties of Ellis, Hill, Hood, Johnson, Somervell in North Central Texas. During his fourteen-year career in the Senate he served on a number of committees, including Finance. He sponsored legislation in insurance reform and securities regulation, and he was elected president pro tem of the Senate in 1955. In addition, in 1957 he sponsored the state's first law requiring the registration of lobbyists.

Martin served in the Senate from 1949 to 1963, when he ran for Lieutenant Governor of Texas. In that race, he was defeated by Preston Smith in the Democratic primary. The next year, however, Governor John Connally appointed Martin as Secretary of State. Martin served as Secretary of State until 1966 when he ran for and was elected Attorney General of Texas.

=== Attorney General ===
Under Martin's leadership, the attorney general's office added antitrust, consumer protection, crime prevention, and water control divisions to its organization. Martin made drug abuse and organized crime a focus, and he was the first attorney general of any state to file successful litigation against commercial drug manufacturers for fixing the prices of antibiotics. By this action his office was able to recover more than $4,000,000 for Texas consumers. Through litigation, Martin's office established the Sabine River boundary between Texas and Louisiana, "thus preserving for Texas extremely valuable oil rights." Martin's activities as attorney general won him both state and national recognition.

Despite his record, Martin was defeated in the 1972 Texas primary by his successor as Secretary of State, John Hill. Also going down to defeat were Governor Preston Smith, Lieutenant Governor Ben Barnes and others tainted, for real or imaginary reasons, by the infamous Sharpstown scandal. All were defeated by "reform" candidates.

Martin died of a heart attack on December 29, 1972, just three days before he was to leave office. He is buried in the State Cemetery in Austin.

Party political offices
Preceded by Waggoner Carr	Democratic nominee for Texas Attorney General; 1966, 1968, 1970	Succeeded by John Hill
Texas Senate
Preceded by A. B. Crawford	Texas State Senator from district 12 (Hillsboro); 1949–1963	Succeeded by J. P. Word
Political offices
Preceded by P. Frank Lane	Secretary of State of Texas; 1963–1966	Succeeded by John Hill
Legal offices
Preceded by Waggoner Carr	Attorney General of Texas; 1967–1972	Succeeded by John Hill
