= 1982 Texas gubernatorial election =

- November 2, 1982
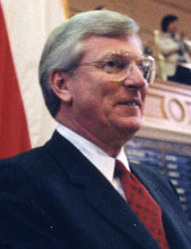

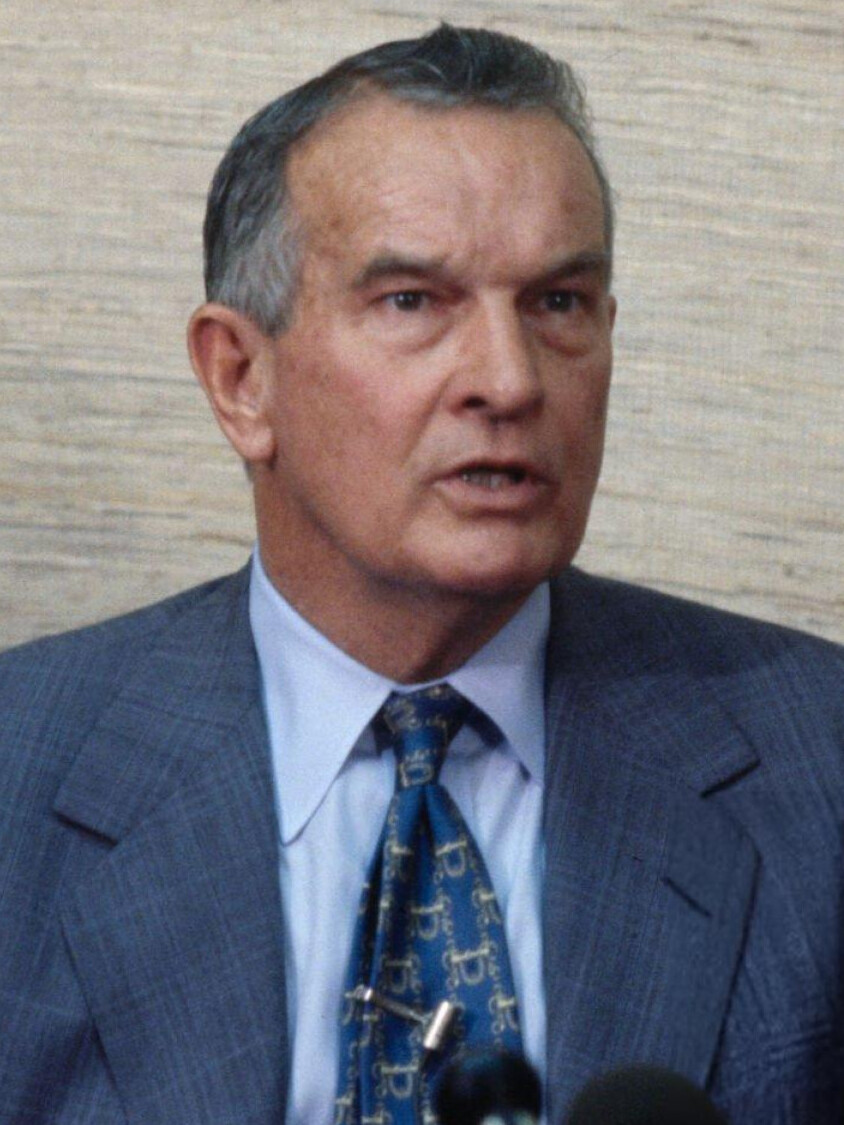
| Nominee | Mark White | Bill Clements |
| Party | Democratic | Republican |
| Popular vote | 1,697,870 | 1,465,937 |
| Percentage | 53.20% | 45.94% |
- County results White: 50–60% 60–70% 70–80% 80–90% Clements: 50–60% 60–70% 70–80%
Governor before election
Bill Clements
Republican
Elected Governor
Mark White
Democratic

The 1982 Texas gubernatorial election was held on November 2, 1982, to elect the governor of Texas. Incumbent Republican governor Bill Clements ran for re-election, but was defeated in the general election by Democrat Mark White, winning 46% of the vote to White's 53%. White was sworn into office on January 18, 1983.

White carried 196 out of 254 counties. As of 2026, this is the last time a Democrat carried Carson, Oldham, Donley, Wheeler, Castro, Floyd, Motley, Lamb, Hockley, Terry, Cochran, Lynn, Garza, Kent, King, Gaines, Dawson, Martin, Howard, Coke, Runnels, Coleman, Brown, Callahan, Eastland, Shackelford, Stephens, Young, Jack, Erath, Hood, Somervell, Parker, Johnson, Ellis, Hunt, Franklin, Wood, Upshur, Van Zandt, Nacogdoches, Cherokee, Anderson, Freestone, Leon, San Jacinto, Liberty, Lee, Washington, Austin, Fayette, Colorado, Wharton, Lavaca, Jackson, Matagorda, Goliad, Wilson, Karnes, Atascosa, Gonzales, Bell, Coryell, Bosque, Hamilton, Lampasas, Mills, San Saba, McCulloch, Concho, Llano, Burnet, Schleicher, Real, Kinney, Uvalde, Medina, Reagan, Upton, Crane, Winkler, or Ward counties.

== Primaries ==
=== Candidates ===
- Bill Clements, Incumbent
- Duke Embs

Republican primary results
| Party | Candidate | Votes | % |
|---|---|---|---|
| Republican | Bill Clements (incumbent) | 246,120 | 92.58% |
| Republican | Duke Embs | 19,731 | 7.42% |
| Total votes | | 265,851 | 100.00 |

=== Candidates ===
- Mark White, Attorney General
- Buddy Temple, Railroad Commissioner
- Bob Armstrong, Land Commissioner
- David Young
- Ray Allen Mayo II
- Donald R. Beagle

Democratic primary results
| Party | Candidate | Votes | % |
|---|---|---|---|
| Democratic | Mark White | 592,658 | 44.94 |
| Democratic | Buddy Temple | 402,693 | 30.54 |
| Democratic | Bob Armstrong | 262,189 | 19.88 |
| Democratic | David Young | 25,386 | 1.93 |
| Democratic | Ray Allen Mayo II | 20,088 | 1.52 |
| Democratic | Donald R. Beagle | 15,649 | 1.19 |
| Total votes | | 1,318,663 | 100.00 |

Temple refused to participate in the runoff, causing White to win by default.

== Results ==
General election Results
| Party | Candidate | Votes | % |
|---|---|---|---|
| Democratic | Mark White | 1,697,870 | 53.20% |
| Republican | Bill Clements (incumbent) | 1,465,937 | 45.94% |
| Libertarian | David Hutzelman | 19,143 | 0.60% |
| Independent | Bob Poteet | 8,065 | 0.19% |
| Total votes | | 3,191,091 | 100.00% |
| Democratic gain from Republican | | | |
