= No Pass No Play =

Texas public education policy

No Pass No Play is a Texas public education policy that came about as a result of the passage of House Bill 72 by the Texas Legislature in 1984, and became effective in 1985. Under No Pass No Play, students must pass all their school courses to be allowed to participate in extracurricular activities such as athletics or fine arts (choir, band, orchestra, dance, drama).

== History ==
An account cited that the root of No Pass No Play policy can be traced back to the beginning of the 20th century when athletics started to become more popular than academics. For decades, the divergence of curricula became controversial and the adverse impact of extracurricular activities to core subjects such as mathematics, science, history, and reading, among others, became the subject of debate.

In 1984, then-Governor Mark White appointed Dallas businessman Ross Perot to lead a commission to study public education reform in Texas. As a result of the study, a sweeping package of educational reforms were proposed to the Texas Legislature, including No Pass No Play. The reforms were ultimately enacted as part of a series of reforms included in House Bill 72, which was passed in 1984 under White's direction, and became effective the following year. The law was finally passed by the second called session of the 68th Texas legislature, and signed by White on July 13, 1984.

The rule stipulates that Texas public school students who participate in extracurricular activities must achieve a passing grade (70% or higher, 60% or higher for Advanced Placement (AP), Pre-AP or GT) in order to qualify to continue participating in extracurricular activities such as athletics, band, and orchestra. Progress is assessed following each six-week grading period. If students receive at least one failing grade on their report card, they are ineligible to participate in extracurricular activities until the failing grade(s) reach acceptable levels. No Pass No Play affects all students involved in extracurricular activities in all school districts.

== Effect ==
The rule went into effect between semesters of the 1984–1985 school year. At the Houston Independent School District, the percentages of failing report card grades for all high school campuses decreased from 16 percent to 13 percent. Twenty-three of the district's 26 high schools had decreases in "F" grades. Later studies also revealed that students reported favorable attitudes towards the policy. However, it was found that extracurricular participation of at-risk students had decreased.

Versions of No Pass No Play were also enacted in other states. For instance, Arizona imposed a policy that required a passing grade in every class while California adopted a 2.0 or C average requirement while allowing local districts to impose higher restrictions.

== In popular culture ==
The animated sitcom King of the Hill, which is set in Texas, deals with the policy in its 2000 episode "Peggy Makes the Big Leagues".

== See also ==
- Texas Education Agency
