= Mark White (Texas politician) =

American politician (1940–2017)

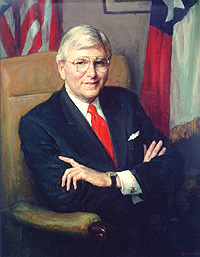
- Official Portrait, c. 1987

43rd Governor of Texas
- In office January 18, 1983 – January 20, 1987
- Lieutenant: William P. Hobby Jr.
- Preceded by: Bill Clements
- Succeeded by: Bill Clements

46th Attorney General of Texas
- In office January 19, 1979 – January 18, 1983
- Governor: Bill Clements
- Preceded by: John Hill
- Succeeded by: Jim Mattox

74th Secretary of State of Texas
- In office January 19, 1973 – October 27, 1977
- Governor: Dolph Briscoe
- Preceded by: V. Larry Teaver Jr.
- Succeeded by: Steven C. Oaks

Personal details
- Born: Mark Wells White Jr. March 17, 1940 Henderson, Texas, U.S.
- Died: August 5, 2017 (aged 77) Houston, Texas, U.S.
- Resting place: Texas State Cemetery; Austin, Texas, U.S.
- Party: Democratic
- Spouse: Linda Thompson (m. 1966)
- Children: 3
- Education: Baylor University (BBA, JD)

Military service
- Allegiance: United States
- Branch/service: United States Army
- Unit: Texas Army National Guard • 36th Infantry Division

Mark Wells White Jr. (March 17, 1940 – August 5, 2017) was an American politician and lawyer who served as the 43rd governor of Texas from 1983 to 1987. A member of the Democratic Party, he served as the 74th secretary of state of Texas from 1973 to 1977 and as the 46th attorney general of Texas from 1979 to 1983.

White was elected governor in the 1982 gubernatorial election, defeating the incumbent Bill Clements. As governor, White sought to improve education, transportation, water resources, law enforcement, and taxes to attract new industry to Texas. He appointed the first Hispanic woman to serve as a judge of a district court in Texas, Elma Salinas Ender. In the 1986 gubernatorial election, White lost to former Republican governor Clements, 52.7% to 46.0%.

== Early life ==
White was born in Henderson, Texas, to Mark Wells White Sr. and Sarah Elizabeth White. In Houston, he attended Woodrow Wilson Elementary School (now Baker Montessori School), Lanier Junior High School and Lamar High School.

White attended Baylor University in Waco, Texas, where he was a member of the Tryon Coterie Club (now the Texas Lambda chapter of Phi Delta Theta). He subsequently graduated from Baylor Law School in 1965. He was a member of University Masonic Lodge 1190 in Austin, Texas.

== Early roles in state government ==
White served as the state's assistant attorney general from 1966 to 1969. He later returned to Houston to begin private practice. By 1972, he was working for the Joe Reynolds firm in Houston. White became interested in state government again upon the election of Dolph Briscoe to the Governor's Mansion in 1972.

== Texas Secretary of State ==
In 1973, White was appointed as Texas Secretary of State under Governor Briscoe and also served in the 36th Infantry Division of the Texas National Guard.

Briscoe explained on his appointment of White as the 74th Texas Secretary of State: "When I began to consider candidates for secretary of state, I realized that it was crucial to appoint someone with legal training who shared my political views and who was loyal, energetic, and personable," Briscoe wrote in his memoirs. "Mark was a brilliant and ambitious young lawyer as well as an extremely personable young man. I felt that he would make an excellent secretary of state." Briscoe asked White to come to Austin. But White, Briscoe later recalled, thought the conversation would be about serving in the secretary's office and not actually being secretary and was "shocked" to be chosen for the office.

Briscoe wrote: "In my opinion, Mark White made a fine secretary of state as any governor has ever had.... During the legislative sessions, he served as my liaison with [Lieutenant Governor] Bill Hobby. Whenever things weren't going well with one of our bills in the Senate, Mark was always ready to go to work on the senators who were having problems supporting the bill. He was a persuasive advocate for our program... He enjoyed doing it, and he had excellent relations with members of the Senate. Mark White's talent and ambition would eventually lead to his election as attorney general in 1978 and governor in 1982."

During his tenure as the state's chief elections officer, he streamlined the legal operations and made the services more responsive to the public during his tenure. White was elected president of the National Association of the Secretaries of State in 1977, this was the association's highest office — and White was elected secretary and treasurer earlier.

== Texas State Attorney General ==
White served as secretary of state until 1977, when he resigned to run for state attorney general, where he served until 1983. First, White defeated former State House Speaker Price Daniel Jr., the son of former Texas Governor Price Daniel, in the Democratic primary and in general election, he comfortably defeated the Republican choice, James A. Baker, III, a Houston lawyer, businessman, and power broker affiliated with the Bush family of Houston. White polled 1,249,846 votes and (55.13 percent) to Baker's 999,431 votes and (44.08 percent). The State Attorney General's position has been used as a launching pad for gubernatorial candidates.

As the state's chief enforcement officer, he co-chaired the Federal-State Enforcement Coordinating Committee and was a member of the Governor's Organized Crime Prevention Council. On the national level, he was elected Chairman of the Southern Conference of Attorneys General in May 1981.

== Governor of Texas (1983–1987) ==
=== 1982 gubernatorial election ===
White declined to seek a second term as state attorney general, but chose to seek the governorship in 1982 against fellow Democrat Bob Armstrong, who was the outgoing state Land Commissioner, who vacated the General Land Office following twelve years, and then the incumbent Bill Clements, Texas' first Republican governor since Reconstruction. In November 1982, he defeated Clements over concerns about the governor's poor economic numbers and lack of support from minority groups. White received 1,697,870 votes (53.2 percent) to Clements' 1,465,537 (45.9 percent) in a year where Texas Democrats swept all the statewide offices up for grabs; led by U.S. senator Lloyd Bentsen (who won a third six-year term to the Senate) and the legendary Lieutenant Governor of Texas William P. Hobby Jr.

=== Tenure ===
As the state's 43rd chief executive from January 18, 1983, to January 20, 1987, White worked to "preserve and enhance... resources so that Texas would not fall back, but go forward as a state of the future". His main concerns were the economy and education. By focusing on Texas' resources, White was able to work on many problems facing the state in the early 1980s. The Texas economy during the early and mid-1980s was volatile. The price of oil declined and pushed Texas into a recession. This led Governor White to "lay the groundwork for a more diversified economy—one less reliant upon the ... swings of a single industry".

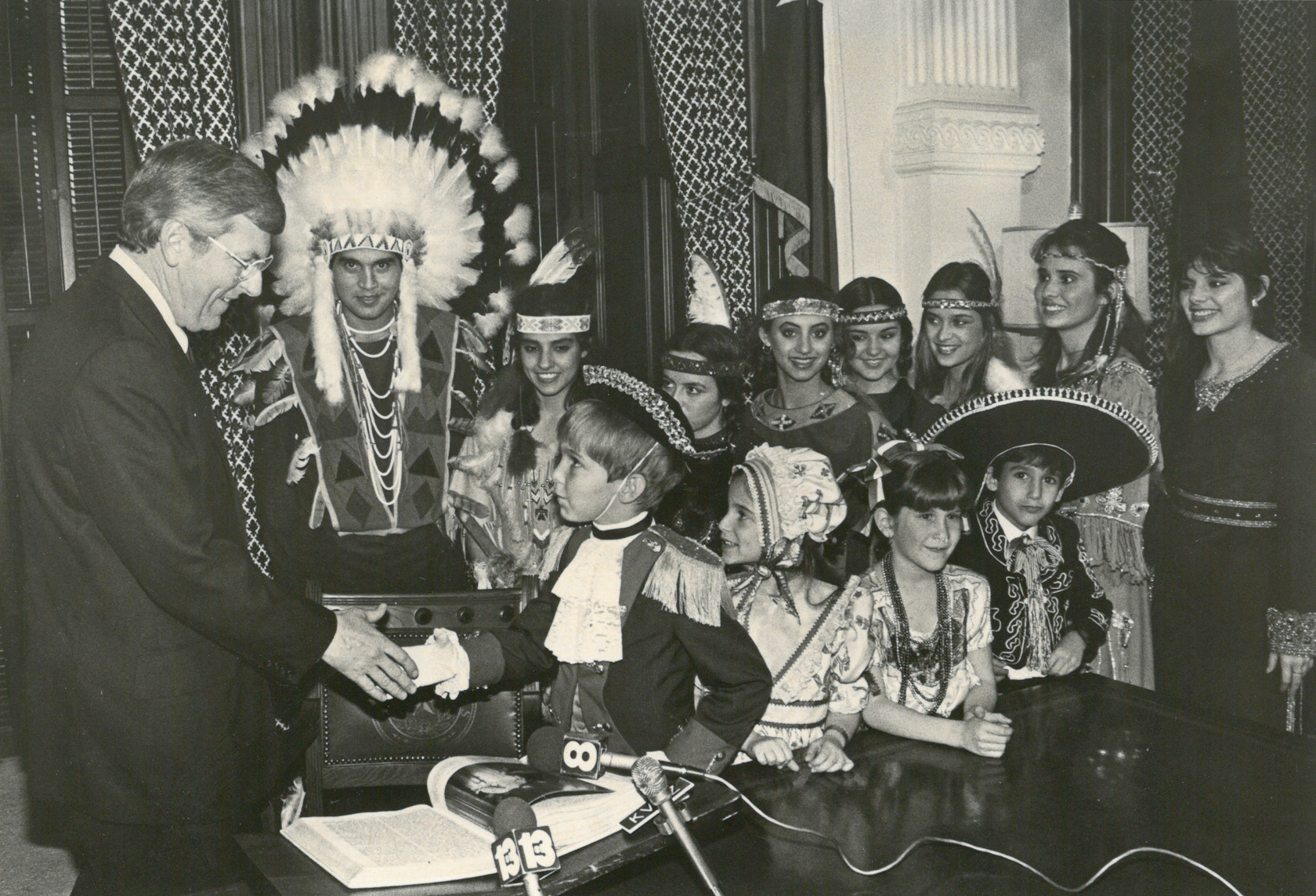
Governor White in Austin, 1983

White served as governor during the Texas sesquicentennial in 1986 and oversaw a number of the celebrations concerning that anniversary.

Among White's appointments was Elma Salinas Ender as the first Hispanic woman to serve as judge of a district court in Texas. From 1983 until her retirement in 2012, Ender was judge of the 341st Judicial District, based in Laredo. White also appointed Myra McDaniel as the first African American to serve as general counsel to the governor in 1983 and later appointed her as Texas Secretary of State in 1984.

Described by one study as a “Modern Populist,” White presided over the passage of numerous progressive reforms during his tenure including health insurance for retired teachers, unemployment insurance for farmworkers, healthcare for indigent persons, a rise in the eligibility cap for the Aid to Families with Dependent Children program, and new rights in the workplace.

Education reform was also a top priority of White's. When he took office, Texas was ranked as one of the lowest performing states for the Scholastic Aptitude Test (SAT) also in teachers' salaries. After taking office, White immediately appointed a committee on Public Education, called a special session of the legislature in 1984, and worked with lawmakers to pass the Educational Opportunity Act (EOA).

By focusing on education, White was able to make Texas a "state of the future" with regard to its most important resource, its children. Through his diligent work as Governor of Texas, many of the problems of the present and future were alleviated.

==== Alaska ====
In 1983 Gov. White reportedly used the phrase "cold, barren place" about the largest American state. The words "we’ll split Alaska in two and make Texas the third largest state" predate this by over a decade. In 1994 The Economist printed about "Texas representatives who were trying to block Alaska's statehood" and a similar threat: "we'll divide Alaska."

=== 1986 gubernatorial election ===
In the 1986 gubernatorial election, White lost to former Republican governor Clements, 52.7% to 46.0%. Some believe that the wildly unpopular "no-pass, no-play" policies of the White administration, which prohibited any high school student athletes from participating in varsity sports if they were failing any single element of their overall class load, sealed the doom of a second term. Clements polled 1,813,779 votes (52.7%) to White's 1,584,515 votes (46.1%) in the November 1986 general election and left office on January 20, 1987.

=== Post-governorship ===
Following his departure from office, White worked for the law firm Keck, Mahin & Cate. White attempted to run for governor again in 1990, but he was defeated in the Democratic primary by state Treasurer Ann Richards, who then defeated Jim Mattox in a runoff election and the Republican Clayton W. Williams, Jr., in the general election. During the 1990 campaign, a campaign commercial depicted White "walking down a hallway displaying larger-than-life photos of the men put to death during his administration in 1983-1986. 'Only a governor can make executions happen,' White declared as ominous music played in the background. 'I did, and I will.'" Richards went on to narrowly win the 1990 general election, but was defeated for reelection in 1994.

White practiced law and was chairman of the board of the Houston Independent School District Foundation, a non-profit organization which supports the public schools. White endorsed Houston City Council candidate Jolanda Jones in the 2003 and 2007 city elections. The latter endorsement helped lead to Jones winning an at-large seat on the council. He also endorsed then-United States Senator Barack Obama (D-Illinois) in the Texas primaries for the 2008 Democratic presidential nomination, which Obama went on to win the presidency.

In 2010, White voiced support for a posthumous exoneration of Cameron Todd Willingham, who is believed by many to be wrongfully convicted and executed for arson and murdering his three daughters. For the first time, White, who had before been a strong supporter of the death penalty and presided over 22 executions as governor, expressed openness to abolition of the death penalty under the reason of the possibility of innocent people being wrongfully executed.

In 2011, White publicly opposed Texas A&M's potential departure from the Big 12 conference to join the Southeastern Conference (SEC).

== Death ==
White died from a heart attack at his home in Houston on August 5, 2017. He was survived by his wife Linda Gale and his three children. At the time of his death, White had been suffering from kidney cancer for many years.

At his funeral on Wednesday, August 9, 2017 at Second Baptist Church Worship Center in Houston, the officiant was Pastor Homer Edwin Young and among the attendees who were there also included White's fellow governors: former U.S. president George W. Bush, United States Secretary of Energy Rick Perry and incumbent governor Greg Abbott. Mourners included former lieutenant governor of Texas William P. Hobby Jr., then-Lieutenant Governor Dan Patrick, Mayor of Houston Sylvester Turner, former U.S. Congressman Craig Washington, and many others.

On August 10, 2017, White's remains lay in state for three hours in the Texas State Capitol. Luci Baines Johnson, daughter of U.S. President Lyndon B. Johnson, paid tribute to her friend White, who she said "may have left public office, but he never left public service. ... He welcomed the big tent of folks. He was not a divider; he was a unifier."

He is interred at the Texas State Cemetery in Austin, where a private graveside ceremony was held.

== Legacy ==
Mark White Elementary School, a Houston Independent School District elementary school, opened in August 2016. In 1985, he made a cameo appearance as himself in the hit 1980's drama Dallas.

Mark White's son Andrew announced a run for Governor of Texas in the 2018 election. In the March 6, 2018 Democratic Party primary, he placed second, forcing a runoff with former Dallas County Sheriff Lupe Valdez on May 22, 2018. White lost the runoff election, 52% to 47%.

Political offices
Preceded by V. Larry Teaver Jr.	Secretary of State of Texas; January 19, 1973–October 22, 1977	Succeeded by George Strake Jr.
Preceded by Bill Clements	Governor of Texas; January 18, 1983–January 20, 1987	Succeeded by Bill Clements
Legal offices
Preceded by John Hill	Attorney General of Texas; January 19, 1979–January 18, 1983	Succeeded by Jim Mattox
Party political offices
Preceded by John Hill	Democratic nominee for Texas Attorney General; 1978	Succeeded by Jim Mattox
Preceded by John Hill	Democratic nominee for Governor of Texas; 1982, 1986	Succeeded by Ann Richards
