= Bill Clements =

American businessman and politician (1917–2011)

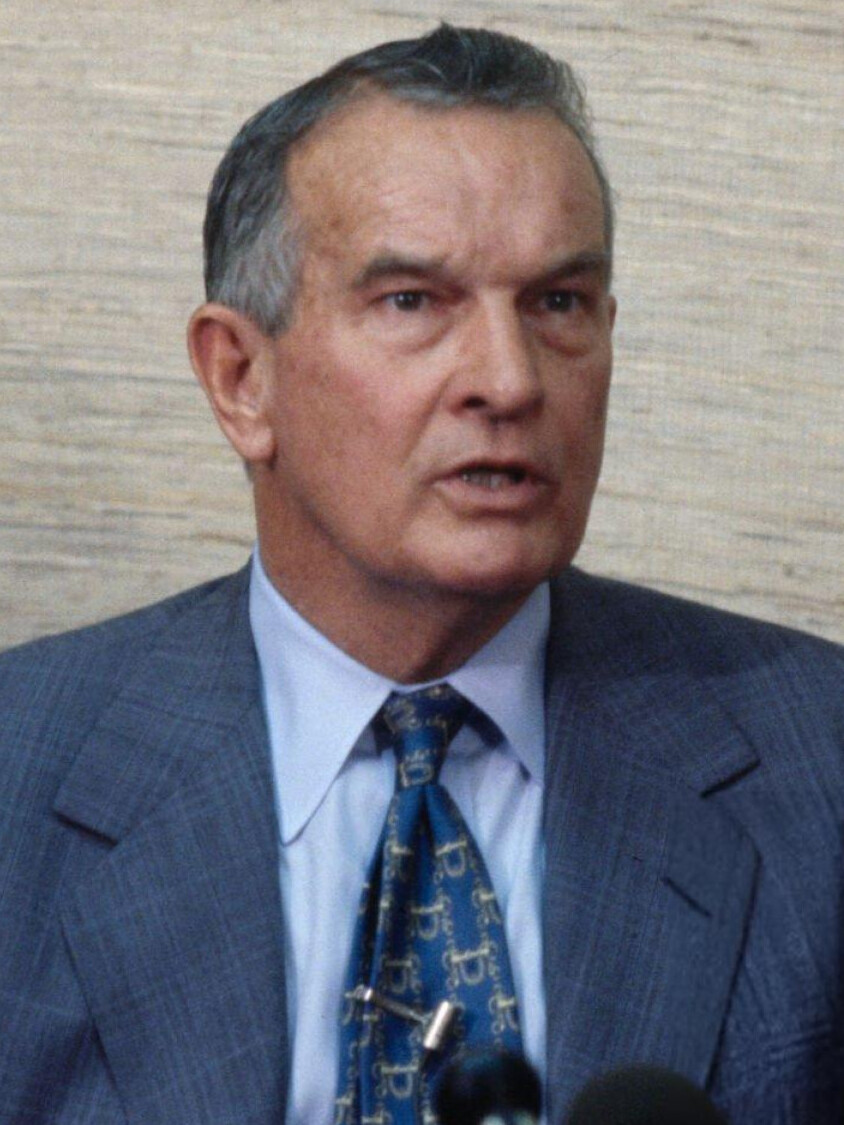
- Clements in 1978

42nd & 44th Governor of Texas
- In office January 20, 1987 – January 15, 1991
- Lieutenant: William P. Hobby Jr.
- Preceded by: Mark White
- Succeeded by: Ann Richards
- In office January 16, 1979 – January 18, 1983
- Lieutenant: William P. Hobby Jr.
- Preceded by: Dolph Briscoe
- Succeeded by: Mark White

Acting United States Secretary of Defense
- In office May 24, 1973 – July 2, 1973
- President: Richard Nixon
- Preceded by: Elliot Richardson
- Succeeded by: James R. Schlesinger

15th United States Deputy Secretary of Defense
- In office January 30, 1973 – January 20, 1977
- President: Richard Nixon; Gerald Ford
- Preceded by: Kenneth Rush
- Succeeded by: Robert Ellsworth

Personal details
- Born: William Perry Clements Jr. April 13, 1917 Dallas, Texas, U.S.
- Died: May 29, 2011 (aged 94) Dallas, Texas, U.S.
- Resting place: Grove Hill Memorial Park
- Party: Republican
- Spouses: Pauline Gill (m. 1940; div. 1975) Rita Crocker (m. 1975)
- Children: 2
- Education: Southern Methodist University
- Profession: Oil driller

Military service
- Allegiance: United States
- Branch/service: United States Army
- Years of service: 1941–1945
- Unit: United States Army Corps of Engineers
- Battles/wars: World War II

William Perry Clements Jr. (April 13, 1917 – May 29, 2011) was an American businessman and Republican Party politician who served two nonconsecutive terms as the governor of Texas between 1979 and 1991. His terms bookended the sole term served by Mark Wells White, a Democrat who defeated Clements in the 1982 election only to lose his campaign for reelection in 1986.

When Clements first entered office in 1979, he was the first Republican to have served as governor of Texas in over a century. When Clements left office for good at the end of his second term in 1991, his eight years in office were the most served by any Texas governor until Rick Perry surpassed his total in 2009. Clements was the first governor to be elected to multiple terms since Texas changed its constitution in 1972 to extend its governor's term of office to four years. Since then, George W. Bush, Rick Perry, and Greg Abbott, also Republicans, have all won multiple terms.

Before he became Governor of Texas, Clements made his fortune in crude oil and served as United States Deputy Secretary of Defense for President Richard Nixon. After his first gubernatorial term ended, Clements joined the administrative staff at Southern Methodist University where he served as chairman of the Board of Governors. While there, he presided over a massive pay-to-play system in the school's football program that resulted in catastrophic consequences for the team and the end of his political career.

== Early life and career ==
Born in Dallas, Texas, Clements graduated from Highland Park High School in the Dallas suburb of University Park in 1934. Although Clements was an all-state offensive guard on the Highland Park football team, after his father lost his job due to the Great Depression, Clements worked as an oil driller in South Texas after graduating from high school. In the late 1930s, Clements studied engineering at Southern Methodist University before dropping out and returning to the oil industry. During World War II, Clements served in the United States Army Corps of Engineers.

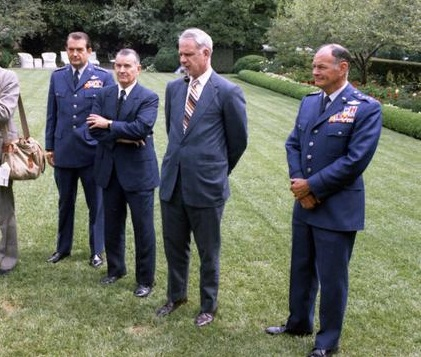
Deputy Secretary of Defense Bill Clements met with Secretary of Defense James Schlesinger, Chairman of the Joint Chiefs of Staff General George S. Brown, and Air Force Chief of Staff General David C. Jones at the White House in January 1975.

In 1947, Clements founded the offshore drilling business Southeastern Drilling Company (SEDCO), which would expand to 20 countries and grow into the top drilling contracting company in the world before being sold to Schlumberger in 1984. Clements had a personal wealth worth nearly $30 million by 1978, the year he first ran for Texas governor.

From 1973 to 1977, Clements served as United States Deputy Secretary of Defense under Presidents Richard Nixon and Gerald Ford. For 39 days in 1973, Clements served as acting Secretary of Defense.

Among the Secretaries of Defense he served under was Donald Rumsfeld, during the latter's first tenure in the office. The two men did not get along, yet when Rumsfeld was appointed, Clements resisted efforts to be moved to another department, even going so far as to threaten, if removed from his office, to hold a press conference and label his dismissal a "power play." Though Clements remained as deputy secretary, Clements later termed his time under Rumsfeld "very unpleasant."

== First Term as Governor of Texas (1979–1983) ==
On January 16, 1979, Clements succeeded Democrat Dolph Briscoe as governor of Texas. To win the position, he first defeated state Representative Ray Hutchison in the Republican primary by a lopsided vote of 115,345 to 38,268. He won the general election held on November 7, 1978, by narrowly defeating Democratic former Texas Supreme Court Chief Justice John Luke Hill, who had also served six years as state attorney general. Clements polled 1,183,828 votes (49.96 percent) to Hill's 1,166,919 votes (49.24 percent).

His first term was marked by SEDCO's involvement in the largest oil blowout in history, the Ixtoc I oil spill, which caused extensive environmental damage. Clements faced heavily Democratic state legislatures during his tenure. In 1979, the legislature overrode one of his vetoes, the last time that Texas lawmakers had completed an override. In 1980, Clements commuted the death sentence of Randall Dale Adams to life in prison. Adams, the subject of The Thin Blue Line, an Errol Morris documentary film, was exonerated in 1989 after serving twelve years in prison. Clements was also governor at the time of the execution of Carlos DeLuna, who was put to death in 1989; evidence questioning the findings of the facts that underlie DeLuna's conviction was published in 2012.

Clements ran for reelection in 1982 but was defeated by Democratic Attorney General Mark Wells White by more than 327,000 votes because of sagging economic indicators and weak support from minority voters, who historically support Democratic candidates. Clements was also damaged politically by the Ixtoc I oil spill disaster; the rig that failed was owned by SEDCO, but leased to Permargo (a Mexican drilling firm), which had an exploration contract with Pemex, despite his shares in SEDCO, being held in blind trust at the time. His opponent, White, as attorney general, led the state's lawsuit against SEDCO. White received 1,697,870 votes (53.2 percent) to Clements's 1,465,537 (45.9 percent).

== Staging the 1986 comeback ==
In between his two terms as governor, Clements was chairman of the board of governors of Southern Methodist University in Dallas. He ran again in 1986 and won a contested GOP primary against U.S. Representative Thomas Loeffler of New Braunfels, the seat of Comal County, and former Democratic-turned-Republican Congressman Kent Hance of Lubbock. In the fall, Clements unseated Governor White, who was hurt by the unpopularity of the "no pass/no play" policy involving high school athletics and proposed teacher competency testing. In gaining his second term, Clements polled 1,813,779 ballots (52.7 percent) to White's 1,584,512 (46.1 percent). Clements had turned the tables on White in a near mathematical reversal of the 1982 results and was inaugurated for a second nonconsecutive term on January 20, 1987, just after White came "struggling up to Clements in the Capitol rotunda" and extended a hand for a handshake with congratulations, and Clements simply shook it without comment and turned away.

== Second term as Governor of Texas (1987–1991) ==
Clements's second term was marred by a startling revelation he made two months after taking office. On March 3, 1987, Clements admitted that he and the other members of the SMU board of governors had approved a secret plan to continue payments to 13 football players from a slush fund provided by a booster. Clements said that the board agreed to "phase out" the slush fund at the end of the 1986 season but that it felt duty-bound to honour prior commitments to the players. The decision to continue the payments ultimately led to the NCAA shutting down the football program for the 1987 season—the so-called "death penalty." SMU then opted not to field a team in 1988 either, claiming it could not put together a competitive squad. The shutdown and other sanctions left the once-proud Mustang football program in ruin; SMU would not procure another bowl bid until 2009, and it would also be another ten years before they would be ranked in the top 25 in the Amway Coaches Poll by USA Today. A few months later, the College of Bishops of the United Methodist Church released a report detailing an investigation of its own into the scandal. It revealed that Clements had met with athletic director Bob Hitch, and the two agreed that the payments had to continue because the football program had "a payroll to meet."

According to the report, in late 1985, then SMU President L. Donald Shields and board of trustees chairman Edwin L. Cox wanted to stop the payments completely, in opposition to Clements and Hitch. The four held a "most important meeting" in August 1985 in Shields's office in the SMU administration building, Perkins Hall. Shields and Cox noted that although earlier in the year a phase-out of the payments had been agreed upon by SMU leadership, the NCAA had just enacted the "death penalty" for repeat violators (of which SMU was one, having been cited six times to that point by the organization and twice in the last five years) for violations occurring on or after September 1 of that year, and thus the situation had changed. But Clements, admitting his way would be "taking a chance," argued that if the payments were stopped immediately, star players receiving them would be sure to leave SMU and publicly announce why. Nothing was formally decided at the meeting, but afterwards, Clements and Hitch talked for about fifteen minutes in the Perkins Hall parking lot. Hitch remembered Clements asking him if the payments could be continued and, upon hearing that they could, telling him in no uncertain terms to "do it." And the payments continued (on at least two occasions starting in 1983, after President Shields expressed outrage over the payments and said they had to stop, Clements, an SMU dropout, told the PhD holder Shields to "stay out of it" and to "go run the university").

A week later, Clements apologised for his role in continuing the payments. He said that he had learned about the slush fund in 1984, and an investigation by the board of governors revealed that players had been paid to play since the mid-1970s. Clements said that rather than shutting down the payments immediately, the board "reluctantly and uncomfortably" decided to continue paying players who had already been guaranteed payments. However, he said, in hindsight, the board "should have stopped (the payments) immediately," rather than merely phase them out.

Clements faced calls for his impeachment as a result of these statements; two state legislators argued that he would have never been elected had he honestly addressed his role in the scandal. Under the circumstances, he opted not to run for a third term as governor and was succeeded on January 15, 1991, by Democratic State Treasurer Ann Richards.

During his second term, Clements worked to reduce crime, improve education, boost the Texas economy, and foster better relations with Mexico, especially on issues important to the mutual borders, such as immigration and the war on drugs. However, he did not push as pledged for the initiative and referendum reforms advocated by State Senator Walter Mengden of Houston, based on the principle of California's Proposition 13.

== Post-political life ==
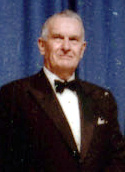
Clements in 1981

In June 2009, Clements donated $100 million to UT Southwestern Medical Center, the largest civic donation in Dallas history. On April 13, 2012, Daniel K. Podolsky, President of UT Southwestern Medical Center announced that the UT System Board of Regents had approved the naming of the new UT Southwestern University Hospital in honor of Clements. On February 16, 2010, Clements and his wife both endorsed Governor Rick Perry's re-election campaign in the 2010 Texas Republican gubernatorial primary against Kay Bailey Hutchison. Clements, incidentally, won the Republican nomination that ultimately led to his first term as governor by defeating Hutchison's husband, Ray, in the 1978 GOP primary.

In October 2010, Clements's son, B. Gill Clements, was murdered at the age of 69 near his ranch in Athens in Henderson County, east Texas. An investor, Clements was also a graduate of Southern Methodist University, married, and the father of three children. He was predeceased by his mother, Pauline Allen Gill Clements, Bill Clements's first wife.

== Death ==
On May 29, 2011, Clements died at age 94 in a Dallas-area hospital from natural causes. He is buried at Grove Hill Memorial Park in Dallas.

== Electoral history ==
=== 1978 ===
1978 Texas Gubernatorial Election, Republican Primary
Party	Candidate	Votes	%
Republican	Bill Clements	115,345	72.82
Republican	Ray Hutchison	38,268	24.16
Republican	Clarence Thompson	4,790	3.02
Total votes		158,403	100.00

1978 Texas Gubernatorial Election
Party	Candidate	Votes	%
Republican	Bill Clements	1,183,828	49.96
Democratic	John Luke Hill	1,166,919	49.24
Raza Unida	Mario C. Compeán	14,213	0.59
Socialist Workers	Sara Johnston	4,624	0.19
Total votes		2,369,999	100.00
Republican gain from Democratic			

=== 1982 ===
1982 Texas Gubernatorial Election
Party	Candidate	Votes	%
Democratic	Mark White	1,697,870	53.20
Republican	Bill Clements (incumbent)	1,465,937	45.94
Libertarian	David Hutzelman	19,143	0.60
Independent	Bob Poteet	8,065	0.19
Total votes		3,191,091	100.00
Democratic gain from Republican			

=== 1986 ===
1986 Texas Gubernatorial Election, Republican Primary
Party	Candidate	Votes	%
Republican	Bill Clements	318,808	58.53
Republican	Tom Loeffler	117,673	21.60
Republican	Kent Hance	108,238	19.87
Total votes		554,719	100.00%

1986 Texas Gubernatorial Election
Party	Candidate	Votes	%
Republican	Bill Clements	1,813,779	52.70
Democratic	Mark White (incumbent)	1,584,515	46.04
Libertarian	Theresa S. Doyle	42,496	1.24
Independent	Charles Lee (write-in)	531	0.02
Green	J. Muriel (write-in)	139	0.00
Total votes		3,441,460	100.00
Republican gain from Democratic			

== See also ==
- Southern Methodist University football scandal
- Clements Center for National Security

Party political offices
Preceded by Jim Granberry	Republican nominee for Governor of Texas; 1978, 1982, 1986	Succeeded by Clayton Williams
Political offices
Preceded by Kenneth Rush	United States Deputy Secretary of Defense; January 30, 1973–January 20, 1977	Succeeded by Charles W. Duncan Jr.
Preceded by Dolph Briscoe	Governor of Texas; January 16, 1979–January 18, 1983	Succeeded by Mark White
Preceded by Mark White	Governor of Texas; January 20, 1987–January 15, 1991	Succeeded by Ann W. Richards
