= John Hill (Texas politician) =

American judge

John Luke Hill Jr.

Chief Justice of the Supreme Court of Texas
- In office January 5, 1985 – January 4, 1988
- Preceded by: Jack Pope
- Succeeded by: Thomas R. Phillips

45th Attorney General of Texas
- In office January 1, 1973 – January 19, 1979
- Governor: Dolph Briscoe
- Preceded by: Crawford Martin
- Succeeded by: Mark Wells White

69th Secretary of State of Texas
- In office March 12, 1966 – January 22, 1968
- Governor: John Connally
- Preceded by: Crawford Martin
- Succeeded by: Roy R. Barrera Sr.

Personal details
- Born: October 9, 1923 Breckenridge, Texas, U.S.
- Died: July 9, 2007 (aged 83) Houston, Texas, U.S.
- Resting place: Glenwood Cemetery
- Party: Democratic
- Spouse: Bitsy Hill
- Children: 3
- Education: Kilgore College; University of Texas at Austin (LLB)
- Profession: Lawyer

Military service
- Allegiance: United States
- Branch/service: United States Navy
- Battles/wars: World War II

John Luke Hill Jr. (October 9, 1923 – July 9, 2007) was an American lawyer, politician, and judge who served as the chief justice of the Texas Supreme Court from 1985 to 1988. A member of the Democratic Party, he served as the 69th secretary of state of Texas from 1966 to 1968 and the 45th attorney general of Texas from 1973 to 1979. Hill is the only person to have held all three offices.

== Early life ==
He was born in Breckenridge, the seat of Stephens County to the west of Fort Worth, to Mr. and Mrs. John Luke Hill, Sr. He grew up in Kilgore in Gregg County near the East Texas oil fields.

== Career ==
=== Legal career ===
After attending Kilgore College, Hill received his undergraduate degree from the University of Texas in Austin, Texas, where he was a member of the Texas Cowboys. In 1947, he earned an LL.B., graduating with honors, from the University of Texas School of Law. Hill was admitted to the Texas bar the same year and went to work for a small law firm in Houston which gave him experience in trial work. In 1951, he founded his own Houston-based firm specializing in plaintiff's trial work. He was considered one of the top lawyers in Texas.

Hill won $3.5 million from Lockheed and $8.5 million from Braniff in lawsuits during the early 1960s. He was known for mastering his brief and for his down-to-earth style as an advocate.

=== Political career ===
Hill's career in politics started as a county campaign manager for John B. Connally, Jr., in Harris County during the 1964 gubernatorial campaign. Connally appointed him Secretary of State in 1966 and he served until 1968.

In 1972, Hill was nominated as attorney general when he upset the incumbent Crawford Martin by 100,000 votes in the Democratic primary. It was a year in which Texas incumbents fared particularly poorly in state races. His most significant achievement was persuading the Legislature of Texas to support a deceptive trade practices act providing triple damages for victims of unfair trade practices.

In 1976, he successfully argued the case of Jurek v. Texas before the U.S. Supreme Court, where the Court upheld Texas's death penalty law.

He also played a leading role in closing down the Chicken Ranch in Fayette County, the inspiration for The Best Little Whorehouse in Texas. Hill had a subordinate leak material to reporter Marvin Zindler who ran a week-long series of special reports on The Chicken Ranch putting pressure on Governor Dolph Briscoe. After Briscoe turned to him for advice, Hill suggested that Briscoe call the sheriff of Fayette County who closed down the Chicken Ranch. Hill served as Attorney General until 1979.

Hill challenged Briscoe in 1978 in the Democratic primary and was successful but lost in the general election to Republican Bill Clements. Hill was the first Texas Democrat since 1869 to lose a gubernatorial general election to a Republican nominee.

=== Chief Justice of Texas ===
Hill practiced law until 1984 when he was elected as Texas Supreme Court Chief Justice to succeed the retiring Jack Pope. During this period, there were concerns about ethics of the courts which brought about a legislative committee investigation. The State Commission on Judicial Conduct chastized two justices and CBS's 60 Minutes offered a story on lawyers who practice in the courts making large donations to campaigns. Hill championed reform of the partisan election of judges and argued that judges should be selected based on merit, similar to the system used at the federal level.

== Later life ==
In 1997, Governor George W. Bush called Hill from retirement to ask him to become a member of the Texas Lottery Commission following a scandal. Hill died in 2007 after undergoing heart surgery in St. Luke's Episcopal Hospital in Houston.

Party political offices
Preceded by Crawford Martin	Democratic nominee for Texas Attorney General; 1972, 1974	Succeeded by Mark White
Preceded by Dolph Briscoe	Democratic nominee for Governor of Texas; 1978	Succeeded by Mark White
Political offices
Preceded by Crawford Martin	Secretary of State of Texas; 1966–1968	Succeeded by Roy Barerra, Sr.
Legal offices
Preceded by Crawford Martin	Attorney General of Texas; January 1, 1973 – January 19, 1979	Succeeded by Mark White
Preceded by Jack Pope	Texas Supreme Court Justice, Chief Justice; 1985–1988	Succeeded by Thomas R. Phillips
