= MTG =

Mtg is an abbreviation for the words "meeting" and "mortgage".

MTG may also refer to:

== Businesses and organizations ==
- Mağusa Türk Gücü S.K., a Turkish Cypriot sports club
- Maria-Theresia-Gymnasium, a Munich school for gifted students
- Metalogenia, a ground engaging tools company based in Spain
- Metro Tunneling Group, joint venture of Five Companies
- Modern Times Group, a Swedish media company and owner of Viasat and Metro International
- MTG Hawke's Bay, a museum, art gallery and theatre in New Zealand
- Servicios Aéreos MTT (ICAO airline code MTG), a Mexican airline; see List of airline codes

== Science and technology ==
- Methanol to gasoline, a process for producing liquid hydrocarbons from methanol
- Middle temporal gyrus, a region in the brain
- Meteosat Third Generation, geostationary meteorological satellites built for EUMETSAT
- Monothioglycerol, a thiol used in mass spectrometry and cell culturing

== Places ==
- Mato Grosso Airport (IATA airport code MTG), Mato Grosso, Brazil; see List of airports by IATA airport code: M
- Mottingham railway station (station code MTG), London, England, National Rail station code

== Other ==
- Goliath language (ISO 639 language code mtg)
- Magic: The Gathering, a trading card game
- Marjorie Taylor Greene (born 1974), former Republican member of the United States House of Representatives
  - MTG, a 2023 book by Marjorie Taylor Greene, published by Winning Team Publishing
- Mind the gap, a train announcement
- Man the Guns, an expansion for the strategy game Hearts of Iron IV
- Montagem, a word for remixed songs using Brazilian funk or Portuguese-language phonk
