= Sergio Gor =

American businessman and political operative (born 1986)

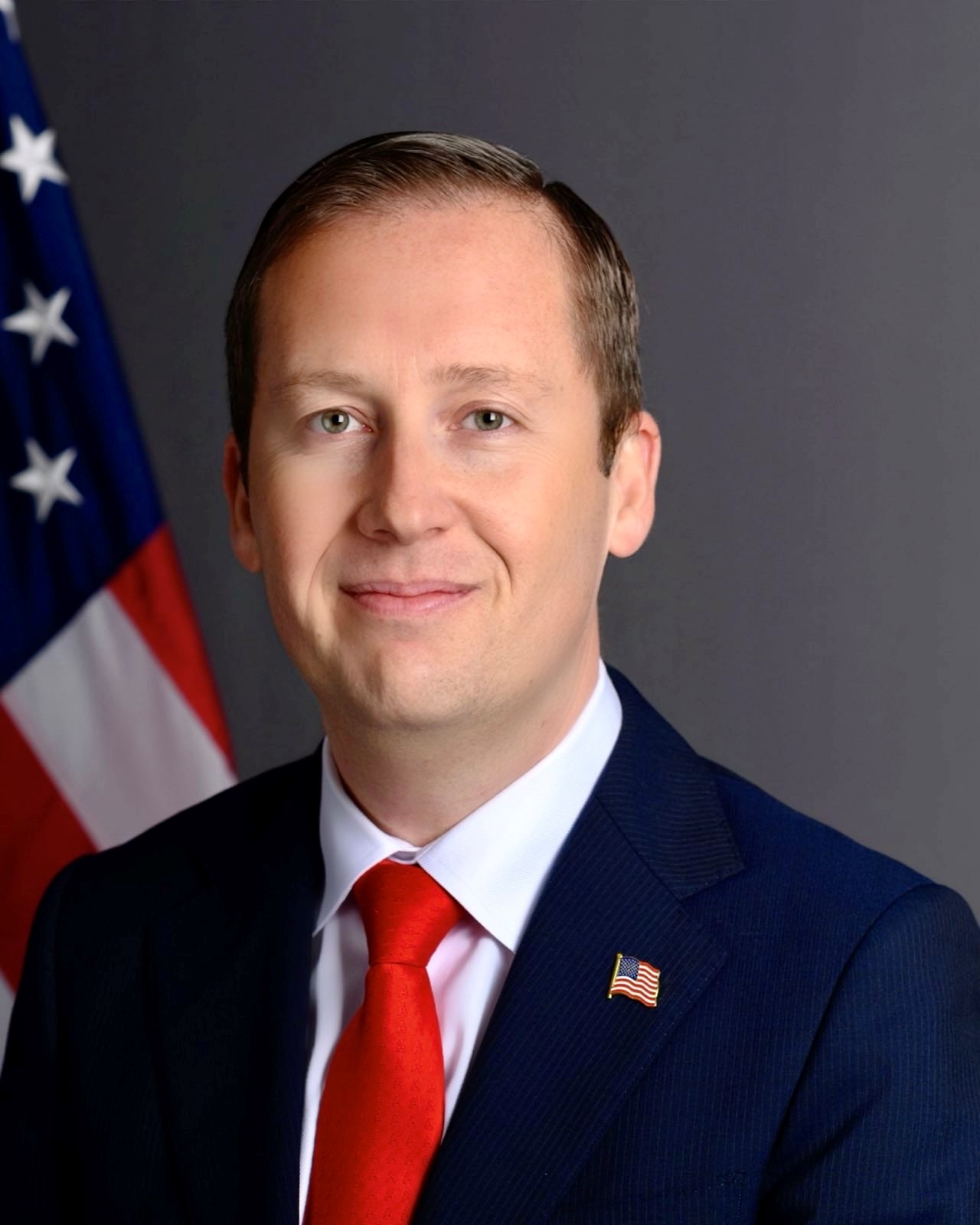
- Official portrait, 2025

27th United States Ambassador to India
- Incumbent
- Assumed office January 14, 2026
- President: Donald Trump
- Preceded by: Eric Garcetti

United States Special Envoy for South and Central Asian Affairs
- Incumbent
- Assumed office August 22, 2025
- President: Donald Trump
- Preceded by: Position established

Director of the White House Presidential Personnel Office
- In office January 20, 2025 – October 13, 2025
- President: Donald Trump
- Deputy: Trent Morse
- Preceded by: Gautam Raghavan
- Succeeded by: Dan Scavino

Personal details
- Born: Sergei Gorokhovsky; November 30, 1986 (age 39) Tashkent, Uzbek SSR, Soviet Union
- Party: Republican
- Education: George Washington University (BA)

Sergio Gor (born Sergei Gorokhovsky, Russian: Сергей Гороховский; November 30, 1986) is an American businessman and political operative who has served as the United States ambassador to India since 2026. Gor has additionally served as the United States special envoy for South and Central Asian affairs since August 2025. He was previously the director of the White House Presidential Personnel Office from January to October 2025.

Gor graduated from George Washington University, where he was involved in conservative causes, participating in College Republicans and founding the university's chapter of Young America's Foundation. He was an activist for Arizona senator John McCain's 2008 presidential campaign and worked for the Republican National Committee, later serving as the spokesman for representatives Steve King, Michele Bachmann, and Randy Forbes. In May 2013, Gor began working for Kentucky senator Rand Paul's political action committee, RANDPAC, eventually serving as Paul's spokesman, communications director, and deputy chief of staff.

In June 2020, Gor left Paul's office to serve as the chief of staff of the Trump Victory Finance Committee. The following month, he began working for Donald Trump Jr. as his consultant and book publishing manager. Trump Jr. and Gor founded Winning Team Publishing, a conservative publishing house, in October 2021; the company published several books about Trump Jr.'s father, Donald Trump, including Our Journey Together (2021), Letters to Trump (2023), and Save America (2024). Gor was a senior advisor to MAGA Inc. and led a political action committee, Right for America, for Trump. In November 2024, Trump named Gor as his director of the White House Presidential Personnel Office.

In August 2025, Trump named Gor as his nominee for United States ambassador to India and as his special envoy for South and Central Asian affairs. The Senate voted to confirm Gor in October.

== Early life and education (1986–2008) ==
Sergei Gorokhovsky was born on November 30, 1986, in Tashkent, then in the Uzbek Soviet Socialist Republic. Gor told The New York Times that his family had moved to Malta when he was two or three, when his first name was changed to Sergio. His mother established a business in Malta. He was raised in Cospicua and attended De La Salle College, a Catholic boys' school, from 1996 to 1999. The Gorokhovskys emigrated from Cospicua in 1999. He attended high school in Los Angeles and graduated from George Washington University. According to The Dispatch, Gorokhovsky enrolled in university using his full surname, but later shortened it to Gor. At George Washington, Gor participated in College Republicans and founded the university's chapter of Young America's Foundation. Gor became a U.S. citizen in 2004.

== Career ==
=== Early political activities (2008–2020) ===
Ahead of the 2008 United States presidential election, Gor supported Arizona senator John McCain's presidential campaign, advocating for McCain through a group for Catholics. To garner attention for Illinois senator Barack Obama's support for the Association of Community Organizations for Reform Now, he wore a squirrel costume to public events. Gor worked for the Republican National Committee.

By June 2010, Gor was working as Iowa representative Steve King's spokesman and as Minnesota representative Michele Bachmann's spokesman by August. For five months, he shared responsibilities for both King and Bachmann. Gor resigned from Bachmann's campaign in February 2011 and began serving as Virginia representative Randy Forbes's communications director by June 2012. That year, he was a booker for Neil Cavuto, a Fox News host.

In May 2013, Gor became the communications director for RANDPAC, the political action committee for Kentucky senator Rand Paul. By December 2014, Gor was serving as Paul's spokesman; the following month, he was his communications director. Internal strife between Rand aides and Gor contributed to failings in Paul's 2016 presidential campaign, according to BuzzFeed News; in one incident, Gor purportedly decided that Paul should appear with an eagle and tasked staffers with finding one. By May 2018, Gor was serving as Paul's deputy chief of staff.

=== Trump campaign work and Winning Team Publishing (2020–2024) ===
In June 2020, Gor left Paul's office to serve as the chief of staff of the Trump Victory Finance Committee. The following month, he began working for Donald Trump Jr. as his consultant and book publishing manager for Liberal Privilege (2020). Gor is an amateur DJ in the West Palm Beach, Florida, area; he was the officiant and DJ for the wedding of Matt Gaetz and Ginger Luckey and the emcee and DJ for Kimberly Guilfoyle's birthday at Mar-a-Lago. Owing to his presence at the club, he earned the nickname the "Mayor of Mar-a-Lago"; for soliciting super PAC funds from club members, he was also known as the "Patio Panhandler". In October 2021, Trump Jr. and Gor incorporated Winning Team Publishing, a conservative publishing house. They announced Our Journey Together (2021), a coffee table book, the following month. The company later published Letters to Trump (2023) and Save America (2024). In September 2022, MAGA Inc. hired Gor as a senior advisor. In February 2024, The New York Times reported that Gor had been named to lead a political action committee, Right for America, for Trump.

== Director of the White House Presidential Personnel Office (January–October 2025) ==
On November 13, 2024, Semafor reported that President-elect Donald Trump had named Gor as his director of the White House Presidential Personnel Office; Trump officially named Gor two days later. Susie Wiles, the incoming chief of staff, tentatively established a staff structure in which the Presidential Personnel Office would serve beneath the Office of Cabinet Affairs, set to be led by Taylor Budowich. Ahead of Trump's second inauguration, Gor led a team of Trump loyalists, including Charlie Kirk, who conducted loyalty tests for government positions. According to the New York Post, Gor had not officially submitted paperwork on his own background by June. In February 2025, Gor was appointed to the board of trustees of the John F. Kennedy Center for the Performing Arts after Trump removed its members.

Gor came into conflict with Elon Musk and his proposed nominees, culminating in an argument at a Cabinet meeting in March. After the meeting, Musk stated that he would not work with Gor, according to Politico. Ahead of a joint press conference on Musk's last day in the White House, Gor provided a background file on Jared Isaacman, Musk's favored nominee for administrator of NASA, that included information about donations Isaacman previously made to Democrats. Gor is believed to have been responsible for Trump withdrawing Isaacman's nomination. After the New York Post's report on Gor's background, Musk referred to him as a "snake". In September, Gor fired Erik Siebert, the acting U.S. attorney for the Eastern District of Virginia, after Trump called for him to be dismissed.

After Trump named Gor as his nominee for United States ambassador to India and as his special envoy for South and Central Asian affairs, Axios reported that Gor would be succeeded by Dan Scavino, the White House deputy chief of staff. Near the conclusion of Gor's tenure, Trump stated that Gor and his team had installed four thousand employees across the federal government, an unverified claim.

== U.S. Special Envoy for South and Central Asian Affairs (2025–present) ==
On August 22, 2025, Donald Trump named Gor as his special envoy for South and Central Asian affairs. According to an Uzbek official, Gor set up a call between Trump and Uzbek president Shavkat Mirziyoyev. He negotiated a US$25 billion commercial deal between the United States and five Central Asian countries and convened a Central Asian business summit at the White House in November.

== U.S. Ambassador to India (2026–present) ==
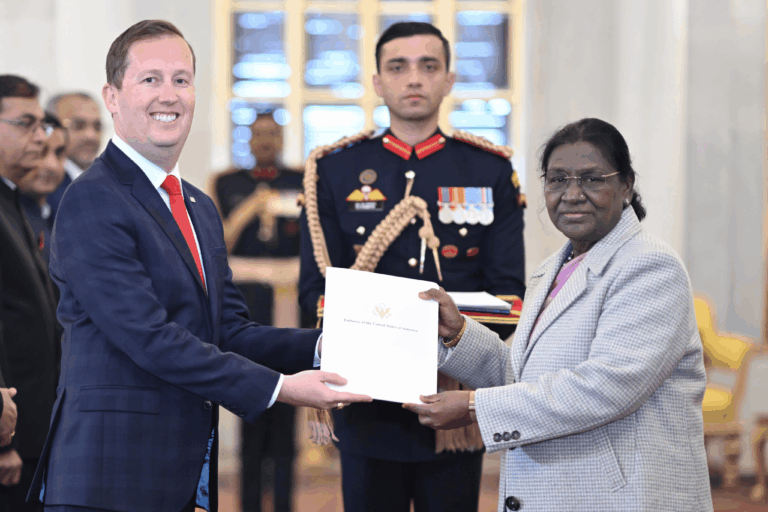
Gor presenting his credentials to President Droupadi Murmu

On August 22, 2025, Trump named Gor as his nominee for United States ambassador to India. Trump's decision came amid tensions in India–United States relations, including ongoing trade negotiations. On October 7, the Senate voted to confirm Gor in a bloc of nominees. He was sworn in on November 10. Gor presented his credentials to Indian president Droupadi Murmu at the Rashtrapati Bhavan in New Delhi on January 14, 2026. As the ambassador to India, Gor moved to cancel an US$850 million renovation of the U.S. embassy in New Delhi.

=== Jammu and Kashmir remarks ===
On August 19, 2026, Gor described Jammu and Kashmir as "an important and integral part of India" during a visit to the disputed territory and indicated that there would be a re-evaluation of travel warnings issued by the State Department to its citizens for visits to the region. His remarks were interpreted by the Indian media as supporting the Indian stance on the issue and prompted a panicked responses from Pakistan, which issued a "strong demarche" to the US charge d'affaires in Islamabad. The Azad Kashmir Legislative Assembly later adopted a resolution rejecting Gor's remarks and affirming the unresolved status of the territorial dispute in the light of UN Security Council resolutions. The remarks were also characterized by Jauhar Saleem as an "off-the-cuff formulation", who, speaking to Al Jazeera, stated that any change in US policy on the issue would be visible in the administration's formal statements, and by Derek Grossman as "eyebrow-raising", having muddled Washington's South Asia policy and being without any historic precedent.

== Works cited ==
- Allen, Mike (February 23, 2024). "Well-funded new super PAC joins Trumpworld". Axios. Archived from the original on December 7, 2025.
- "After meeting CM Omar, US envoy Sergio Gor signals review of travel advisory for J&K". Greater Kashmir. August 19, 2026.
- "AJK Assembly rejects unilateral claims on Kashmir, urges respect for UN resolutions". Daily Parliament Times. August 24, 2026.
- "AJKLA rejects US envoy's remarks". The Express Tribune. August 25, 2026.
- Bailey, Phillip (June 11, 2020). "Rand Paul's longtime aide leaves to join Trump campaign's finance arm". The Courier-Journal.
- Barr, Andy (February 18, 2011). "Bachmann aides bail out". Politico. Archived from the original on March 14, 2026.
- Bender, Michael (September 23, 2022). "Amid G.O.P. Cash Crunch, One Very Flush Ally May Soon Share the Wealth". The New York Times. Archived from the original on October 23, 2022.
- Borg, Jacob (July 8, 2025). "Top 'Maltese' Donald Trump aide actually born in Soviet Union". Times of Malta. Archived from the original on April 3, 2026.
- Burns, Alexander (May 10, 2013). "Rand Paul's one-man band". Politico. Archived from the original on December 25, 2022.
- Burns, Dasha; Marsh, Julia (June 8, 2025). "Trump and Musk aides have spoken amid pause in hostilities". Politico. Archived from the original on June 16, 2025.
- Caputo, Marc (June 3, 2025). "Four reasons Musk attacked Trump's "big beautiful bill"". Axios. Archived from the original on September 28, 2025.
- Caputo, Marc; Isenstadt, Alex; Kight, Stef (June 6, 2025). "The White House adviser who fueled the Trump-Musk NASA feud". Axios. Archived from the original on June 21, 2025.
- Carney, Jordain (October 7, 2025). "Senate confirms largest bloc yet of Trump nominees". Politico.
- Carroll, James (December 12, 2014). "Panel OKs unrestricted military operations vs. ISIS". Courier Journal.
- Clayworth, Jason (June 17, 2010). "Fake Twitter account angers King". The Des Moines Register.
- Cooke, Patrick (October 19, 2008). "From Malta to Massachusetts". Times of Malta. Archived from the original on July 18, 2025.
- Cummings, James (January 26, 2025). "Meet Sergio Gor: The Maltese man at the heart of Trump's administration". Times of Malta. Archived from the original on October 13, 2025.
- Ewing, Giselle (June 19, 2025). "'He's a snake': Musk jabs at Trump adviser who fueled messy presidential breakup". Politico. Archived from the original on June 19, 2025.
- Gray, Rosie; Parti, Tarini (February 3, 2016). "Why Rand Paul Lost". BuzzFeed News. Archived from the original on July 13, 2025.
- Grossman, Derek (August 27, 2026). "Trump's Freewheeling India Envoy Muddles South Asia Policy". Foreign Policy.
- Grynbaum, Michael (January 19, 2025). "Fox News Prepares to Cover a Government Filled With Fox News Alumni". The New York Times. Archived from the original on February 1, 2025.
- Haberman, Maggie; Swan, Jonathan (November 13, 2024). "Trump Plans to Install His Book Publisher as Head of Personnel". The New York Times. Archived from the original on November 14, 2024.
- Haberman, Maggie (August 22, 2025). "Trump Names His Personnel Chief as Ambassador to India". The New York Times. Archived from the original on August 22, 2025.
- Harris, Elizabeth; Karni, Annie (August 6, 2020). "Self-Publishing Is a Gamble. Why Is Donald Trump Jr. Doing It?". The New York Times. Archived from the original on August 1, 2021.
- Harris, Elizabeth; Alter, Alexandra (November 19, 2021). "Trump Is Publishing a Photo Book of His Time in Office". The New York Times. Archived from the original on March 28, 2022.
- Hayworth, Bret (August 28, 2011). "Bachmann, King: Capital's obvious couple". Sioux City Journal.
- "How to make billions vanish in Afghanistan". The Fresno Bee. May 29, 2018.
- Hussain, Abid (August 20, 2026). "Why a Trump envoy's Kashmir visit has led to US-Pakistan spat". Al Jazeera.
- Isenstadt, Alex (August 28, 2024). "Trump claims Zuckerberg plotted against him during the 2020 election in soon-to-be released book". Politico. Archived from the original on October 3, 2024.
- Isenstadt, Alex (August 26, 2025). "Dan Scavino takes over hiring in Trump's White House". Axios. Archived from the original on August 27, 2025.
- Jacobs, Jennifer; Watson, Kathryn (February 13, 2025). "How Trump is reshaping the Kennedy Center, moving away from "woke culture"". CBS News. Archived from the original on June 4, 2026.
- Jacobs, Jennifer (November 12, 2025). "Senior Trump officials roast Sergio Gor, the new U.S. ambassador to India". CBS News. Archived from the original on November 12, 2025.
- Lippman, Daniel (November 30, 2017). "Sergio Gor, communications director for Sen. Rand Paul (R-Ky.)". Politico. Archived from the original on November 20, 2022.
- Lipton, Eric; Haberman, Maggie (March 31, 2022). "She Took the White House Photos. Trump Moved to Take the Profit". The New York Times. Archived from the original on May 19, 2022.
- "Man Dressed As Squirrel Disrupts Democrats". WBNS-TV. October 20, 2008.
- McGraw, Meridith (March 9, 2023). "Trump can't help but show off his letters from Kim Jong Un in his new book". Politico. Archived from the original on March 31, 2023.
- Montebello, Edward (August 14, 2021). "Bormliż li jaħdem viċin Trump jirrakkonta kif darba l-eks President xtralu l-ħwejjeġ għall-golf" [Cospicua man who works close to Trump recounts how the former president once bought him golf clothes] (in Maltese). One. Archived from the original on November 19, 2021.
- Nerozzi, Diana; Kine, Phelim (May 12, 2026). "Trump's man in Central Asia". Politico.
- Okun, Eli; Bianco, Ali (June 17, 2025). "Trump demands 'UNCONDITIONAL SURRENDER!'". Politico. Archived from the original on June 18, 2025.
- "Pakistan summons US diplomat over special envoy Sergio Gor's Kashmir remarks". TRT World. August 19, 2026.
- "Pakistan summons US envoy over Sergio Gor's 'J&K important part of India' remark". Deccan Herald. August 19, 2026.
- Roper, Eric (August 26, 2010). "Bachmann boards campaign bus". Minnesota Star Tribune.
- Rubin, April (November 15, 2024). "Trump names Steven Cheung as White House communications director". Axios. Archived from the original on May 17, 2026.
- Sanger, David; Swan, Jonathan; Haberman, Maggie (December 7, 2024). "Want a Job in the Trump Administration? Be Prepared for the Loyalty Test". The New York Times. Archived from the original on January 15, 2025.
- Schleifer, Theodore; Svitek, Patrick (January 30, 2015). "GOP ace to help Rand Paul". The Houston Chronicle.
- Schmidt, Markus (June 3, 2012). "Petersburg woman takes on Rep. Forbes in primary". The Progress-Index.
- Talcott, Shelby (November 13, 2024). "Ally of Donald Trump Jr. offered top personnel job". Semafor. Archived from the original on March 14, 2026.
- Terris, Ben; LeVine, Marianne (December 12, 2024). "Is this publisher/DJ the most powerful man in Trump's transition?". The Washington Post. Archived from the original on October 11, 2025.
- Thrush, Glenn; Haberman, Maggie; Feuer, Alan; Pager, Tyler (September 27, 2025). "Inside the Trump Administration's Push to Prosecute James Comey". The New York Times. Archived from the original on October 1, 2025.
- Tracy, Abigail (August 21, 2021). ""Trump Was an Inspiration for Me": Matt Gaetz Tries to Shift the Narrative With a MAGA Romance". Vanity Fair. Archived from the original on May 11, 2026.
- Troianovski, Anton (June 13, 2026). "How Sergio Gor Is Transforming the Role of U.S. Ambassador in the Trump Era". The New York Times.
- "U.S. Ambassador Sergio Gor presents credentials to President Murmu". The Hindu. January 14, 2026. Archived from the original on January 18, 2026.
- Wadhams, Nick (August 22, 2025). "Trump Nominates Personnel Aide Sergio Gor as Ambassador to India". Bloomberg News.
- Zengerle, Jason (August 24, 2020). "Donald Trump Jr. Is Ready. But for What, Exactly?". The New York Times Magazine. Archived from the original on August 31, 2021.

Diplomatic posts
Preceded by Eric Garcetti	United States Ambassador to India; 2025–present	Incumbent
