= Save America (book) =

Book by Donald Trump

- Author: Donald Trump
- Language: English
- Publisher: Winning Team Publishing
- Publication date: 2024
- Publication place: United States
- ISBN: 9798990290624

Save America is a book by Donald Trump, the 45th and 47th president of the United States. The book was published through Winning Team Publishing on September 3, 2024, prior to Trump winning that year's presidential election.

== Synopsis ==
The book contains photographs from Trump's time in office as the 45th President as well as his campaign trail. The images are accompanied by quotes, captions describing the photo, and some plans for his then potential upcoming presidency. Figures of discussion include Mark Zuckerberg, who Trump stated was guilty of election fraud against him in 2020 and that Zuckerberg would be arrested if this was repeated with the 2024 elections. Other figures included Canadian Prime Minister Justin Trudeau and his mother Margaret, North Korean dictator Kim Jong Un, and American politician Adam Kinzinger.

The book's cover features a photograph of Trump raising his fist after an assassination attempt was made against him in Pennsylvania on July 13, 2024.

== Publication ==
Save America was published in hardcover format in the United States on September 3, 2024 through Winning Team Publishing, a publishing company Trump co-founded with Sergio Gor.

== Reception ==
=== Sales ===
Quartz and the Hindustan Times both noted that Save America sold well and on its release date, placed first in Amazon's “Presidents & Heads of State Biographies” category and was the thirteenth most sold book in the site's overall list.

=== Critical reception ===
Margaret Hartmann of New York magazine's Intelligencer panned the book, criticizing it as having poor design, repetitive photo choices, and the inclusion of what Hartmann described as debunked conspiracy theories. Shawn McCreesh reviewed Saving America for The New York Times, stating that "while it ultimately adds up to just another cash grab for the elder Mr. Trump, it is also an exercise in branding — a way for him to present a portrait of his presidency as he would like it to be remembered." In his review for The Washington Post, Ron Charles called the book propaganda and "a breathless gallery of Trump’s presidency accompanied by occasional unhinged ramblings."
