= 1970 Texas gubernatorial election =

- November 3, 1970
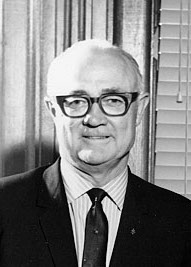

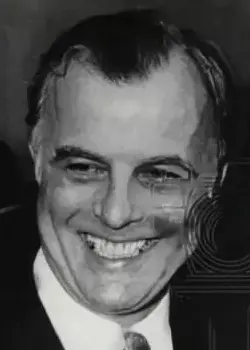
| Nominee | Preston Smith | Paul Eggers |
| Party | Democratic | Republican |
| Popular vote | 1,232,506 | 1,073,831 |
| Percentage | 53.43% | 46.55% |
- County results Smith: 50–60% 60–70% 70–80% 80–90% >90% Eggers: 50–60% 60–70%
Governor before election
Preston Smith
Democratic
Elected Governor
Preston Smith
Democratic

The 1970 Texas gubernatorial election was held on November 3, 1970, to elect the governor of Texas. Incumbent Democratic governor Preston Smith was reelected to a second term, winning 53% of the vote to Republican Paul Eggers' 47% in a rematch of the gubernatorial race of two years earlier. As of 2022, this is the last time Lubbock County voted for the Democratic gubernatorial candidate.

== Primaries ==
=== Republican ===
Republican primary results
| Party | Candidate | Votes | % |
|---|---|---|---|
| Republican | Paul Eggers | 101,875 | 93.45% |
| Republican | Roger Martin | 7,146 | 6.55% |
| Total votes | | 109,021 | 100.00% |

=== Democratic ===
Democratic primary results
| Party | Candidate | Votes | % |
|---|---|---|---|
| Democratic | Preston Smith (incumbent) | 1,011,300 | 100.00% |
| Total votes | | 1,011,300 | 100.00% |

== Results ==
General election results
| Party | Candidate | Votes | % |
|---|---|---|---|
| Democratic | Preston Smith (incumbent) | 1,232,506 | 53.43% |
| Republican | Paul Eggers | 1,073,831 | 46.55% |
| Write-in | | 428 | 0.02% |
| Total votes | | 2,306,765 | 100.00% |
| Democratic hold | | | |
