= Ed Burr =

American businessman

- Born: October 25, 1956 (age 69); Jacksonville, Florida
- Education: Florida State University
- Occupations: President & CEO; GreenPointe Holdings, LLC

Edward E. Burr (born October 25, 1956) is the founder, president and chief executive officer of GreenPointe Holdings, LLC, a diversified holding company that brings together the necessary disciplines to create residential and multi-use communities throughout the Southeastern United States.

== Education ==
Burr is a native to Jacksonville, and graduated from Fletcher High School in 1974. He earned a B.S in accounting from the Florida State University School of Business in 1979.

== Early career ==
Prior to leading GreenPointe Holdings, Burr founded the LandMar Group LLC in 1987 and led the company's creation of master-planned, award-winning communities in Florida and coastal Georgia. Burr's career started as a CPA with Coopers & Lybrand working in Miami and New York City. Burr also founded Hampton Golf & Lifestyles Management with former PGA of America President M.G. Orender in 1998 to develop and manage golf courses and community recreational facilities across the country.

== Civic involvement & awards ==
Burr serves on the Board of the Florida Council of 100 and has served as Chairman of The board of trustees for Florida State University since 2014. In 2021 the university honored Burr with the Bernard F. Sliger Award, the highest honor given by the FSU Alumni Association, as well as the George Langford Award, presented by the Seminole Boosters in recognition of serving FSU's best interests.

He has served as Chairman of the Jacksonville Regional Chamber of Commerce, the Jacksonville Transportation Authority, Jacksonville Civic Council and Jacksonville Country Day School. In 2021 Burr received the Hearthstone Builder Humanitarian Award from the Hearthstone Foundation, a California-based national organization that recognizes home builders who demonstrate a lifetime commitment to public service. In 2022, Burr was one of twelve Ultimate CEO honorees recognized by the Jacksonville Business Journal.

He is also a past board member of the Northeast Florida Builders Association, a full member of the Urban Land Institute (ULI) and a founding member of the ULI Center for Leadership. Burr is the 2021 recipient of the prestigious ULI North Florida Visionary Leader Award.

Burr founded The Monique Burr Foundation for Children, Inc. (MBF) in 1997 to continue the work of his late wife, Monique Burr, a child advocate. MBF is a nonprofit organization based in Jacksonville, Florida dedicated to providing prevention of abuse, bullying, human trafficking, and digital safety education programs to protect children and teens from victimization. MBF Programs are implemented in 27 states, Washington DC and 3 additional countries.
