= Eugene M. Locke =

American lawyer, businessman, politician and diplomat

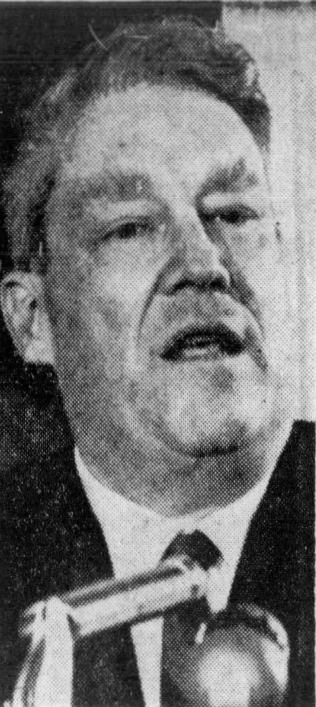
- Eugene M. Locke in 1968.
- Born: Eugene Murphy Locke; January 6, 1918; Dallas, Texas, United States
- Died: April 28, 1972 (aged 54); Dallas, Texas, United States
- Occupations: Lawyer, politician, diplomat

Eugene Murphy Locke (January 6, 1918 – April 28, 1972) was an American lawyer, businessman, politician, and diplomat from Dallas, Texas, who in 1967 was awarded the Presidential Medal of Freedom. He was ambassador to Pakistan in 1966-1967 and deputy ambassador to South Vietnam in 1967-1968 before becoming an unsuccessful candidate for governor of Texas in 1968.

== Education ==
Locke, who was born in Dallas on January 6, 1918, was valedictorian of his class at North Dallas High School, where he graduated in 1934, participating in the January 1934 commencement.

Locke entered the University of Texas with entrance credits from Southern Methodist University, and while at the University of Texas, which he entered in 1934, he was among the highest 2 percent of the roughly 5,000 students in the College of Arts and Sciences during the five semesters prior to February 1937. His academic excellence led to his membership in Phi Beta Kappa at the university.

After graduating from the University of Texas in 1937, Locke entered Yale Law School on Sept. 27, 1937, and he graduated on June 19, 1940. He was a member of the Order of the Coif (designated for the top 10 percent of students in a class).

Among the members of the Phi Delta Phi fraternity at Yale law school posing with Locke for a photo in the spring of 1940 were a future president of the United States (Gerald Ford), two future Supreme Court justices (Potter Stewart and Byron White), a future governor of Pennsylvania (William Scranton), a future U.S. senator from Colorado (Peter Dominick), a future U.S. Secretary of State and Secretary of the Army (Cyrus Vance), a future founder of the Peace Corps, Job Corps and Head Start as well as ambassador to France and vice presidential candidate (Sargent Shriver), a future author who wrote A Night to Remember about the sinking of the Titanic (Walter Lord), a future Secretary of the Army (Stanley Resor), and many others of notable accomplishments.

== Law Firm ==
Eugene M. Locke’s legal heritage in Dallas dated back to the law practice of his paternal grandfather, Maurice Eugene Locke, who practiced law for about 11 years under his own name before his son, Eugene Perry Locke, formed a partnership with him in the summer of 1904 with the firm name of Locke & Locke. Over time, the firm names were Maurice E. Locke (1891–1904); Locke & Locke (1904–1926); Locke, Locke, Stroud & Randolph (1926–1939); Locke, Locke, Dyer & Purnell (1939–1945); Locke, Locke & Purnell (1945–1959); Locke, Purnell, Boren, Laney & Neely (a professional corporation, 1972–1987); Locke Purnell Rain Harrell (1987–1999); Locke Liddell & Sapp (1999–2007); Locke Lord Bissell & Liddell (2007–2011); Locke Lord (name shortened in 2011; name remained Locke Lord despite merger with Edwards Wildman Palmer in 2015).

Maurice Eugene Locke, who was born on a farm in Will County, Illinois, on Feb. 12, 1861, came to Dallas in 1888, when it had a population of 46,701 (more than triple that of 10 years earlier). He arrived as the 27-year-old manager of the Texas department of Jarvis-Conklin Mortgage Trust Company of Kansas City, which advertised that it made loans on improved real estate and ranch property. With him were his wife, Mary Dixon Locke; his six-year-old daughter, Ginevra; and his four-year-old son, Eugene Perry. Maurice Locke also was made president of Central National Bank of Dallas, chartered by Jarvis-Conklin in September 1889. He had previously been a mathematics professor at Valparaiso University, a private university in Valaparaiso, Indiana, from which he had graduated.

In the early 1890s, a downturn in the national and state economies led to the reorganization of Central National Bank of Dallas and to Maurice Locke’s changing professions. In the 1893-1894 Dallas City Directory he is first mentioned as an attorney. By 1902 he had argued insurance cases before the Texas Supreme Court and the U.S. Supreme Court. By 1904 he had built a library of about 10,000 volumes.

In addition, Maurice Locke prepared a plat book of many of the surveys and additions to land in Dallas and built up a library of base abstracts of land titles. The examination of title to real property was a very important part of the firm’s business for its first 50 years.

A 1926 contract agreement forming a firm partnership referenced the ideals of Maurice Locke: "Maurice E. Locke, because of his high character, his lofty ideals, his great ability and his indefatigable industry, set a high standard for the firm. None was higher. The acquisition of money never was the chief aim of the firm. Public distinction never was sought. The firm strove only to render the highest quality of honest service to its clients and to merit their absolute confidence."

That contract agreement came about seven years after Maurice Locke’s death in November 1919. By that time, Eugene P. Locke had been practicing law with his father in the firm of Locke & Locke for 15 years, having joined the firm right after graduating from the University of Texas Law School in 1904. During their partnership, the father and son would argue at least 10 cases before the Texas Supreme Court and would argue for or against writs of certiorari seven times before the U.S. Supreme Court and be granted two such writs.

Indeed, in December 1910, Maurice Locke was recommended as a justice of the U.S. Supreme Court in a letter to Attorney General George Wickersham by Haley Fiske of the New York-based Metropolitan Life Insurance Co. Fiske called Maurice Locke "the best lawyer I ever met," and said he was "quite sure he is the best life insurance lawyer in the United States." Wickersham responded in a letter that Maurice Locke’s name "has been brought to my attention several times" and he is "very highly spoken of" and "may be of value to the Government in some important post."

In addition, in 1940 Eugene P. Locke turned down an offer by Texas Governor W. Lee O’Daniel to be chief justice of the Texas Supreme Court. In his letter declining the offer, Eugene P. Locke wrote that he was "deeply sensible of the great honor" bestowed, but "it will be impossible for me to accept." Locke felt he was better equipped for his position as head of the firm in Dallas.

Among his accomplishments, Eugene P. Locke composed the legal document that brought the Dallas Foundation into existence. It was a document that was long recognized for providing flexibility through grants and appropriate management of gifts. A newspaper editorial after Eugene P. Locke’s death said that he was "widely recognized as one of the country’s most successful and responsible lawyers in the field of civil practice" and that "in the highest ethical concept of the profession he was unflinchingly and indefatigably a seeker of justice through the processes of law."

After graduating from Yale Law School in 1940, Eugene M. Locke signed the partnership agreement for the Locke law firm on March 15, 1941. After the outbreak of World War II, he left the firm and served for a short period with the Office of Price Administration and then joined the Navy, where he served as a gunnery officer on a destroyer called the USS Crosby. It participated in landings, among other places, in the Northern Solomons, New Guinea, Leyte Gulf, and Corregidor in the Philippines. The Crosby was a Wickes-class destroyer, launched in 1918 and recommissioned in 1939, that was converted to a high-speed transport in 1943 and earned a Navy Unit Commendation and 10 battle stars during World War II.

After leaving the Navy, Eugene M. Locke returned to the firm shortly before his father’s death in March 1946 and then jointly began managing the firm with Maurice Purnell, a Harvard Law graduate and son of Eugene P. Locke’s sister, Ginevra Locke Purnell, and her husband, Charles S. Purnell.

While Eugene P. Locke was typically quite formal, not using first names but using the title "Mr." even with close associates and subordinates, Eugene M. Locke was flamboyant and colorful. "He seems early on to have displayed an independence that must have been somewhat distressing to his family and would have been completely out of character for both his grandfather and his father. During one summer in his mid-teens, he is said to have taken to the road in hobo fashion, working as an itinerant farm laborer and in other similar jobs. While in the University of Texas, his family, wanting him to be well-dressed, would send him boxes of new clothes which he would promptly re-box and send back."

Among Eugene M. Locke’s accomplishments at the firm were the organization of the Pan American Sulfur Company, the organization of Wallace Properties (which became Lomas & Nettleton Financial Corp.), and representation in the development of what later became Trinity Industries.

The 1972 annual report of Lomas & Nettleton said of Locke, "Perhaps the most significant clue to his extraordinary capacity for grasping problems quickly and seeing them through to a solution, and a clue also to the warmth and natural joy of his temperament, is that no one going to him with what looked like trouble ever left his presence without a smile, a renewed optimism, and a better understanding." The 1972 report noted that Locke had served as chairman of the board of the company from 1960 to 1963 and as chairman of the executive committee from 1963 to 1967. Lomas Financial was at one point the nation’s largest mortgage banker under the name Lomas & Nettleton, but Lomas Financial filed for bankruptcy protection in 1989.

By 2015, Locke Lord had about 1,000 lawyers in 23 offices around the world. In 2011 it posted gross revenue of $416 million.

== Politics and Diplomacy ==
In 1960, Eugene M. Locke worked on behalf of Lyndon Johnson’s presidential nomination in some states in the Midwest, and he also put his efforts behind the Kennedy-Johnson ticket after the Los Angeles Democratic convention. One of Locke’s first important positions in politics was acting as the campaign manager for John Connally in Connally’s successful run for governor of Texas in 1962. Connally, who had met Locke at the University of Texas, resigned as secretary of the Navy under President Kennedy to run for governor. From November 1962 to March 1964, Locke was chairman of the State Democratic Executive Committee of Texas. He was a delegate from Texas to the Democratic National Convention in 1964. A friend of President Johnson, Locke was named ambassador to Pakistan in May 1966, and he was given credit for improving U.S.-Pakistani relations. On May 1, 1967, he was appointed deputy ambassador to South Vietnam to team with the newly appointed ambassador, Ellsworth Bunker, who succeeded Henry Cabot Lodge. (The photograph at the top was taken while he was deputy ambassador to South Vietnam.) Locke resigned his Vietnam post in January 1968 to make a run for governor of Texas. In an election won by Preston Smith, Locke placed fifth out of 10 candidates in the Democratic primary despite having one of the most notable and easy to sing campaign songs. After his death, a Dallas Morning News editorial called Locke "one of the most distinguished civic and political figures" of Dallas and noted his receipt of the nation’s highest civilian award, the Presidential Medal of Freedom. The medal’s citation, from President Johnson, states that Locke "served with enormous skill" while he was ambassador to Pakistan and that he "brought impressive energy, high intelligence, integrity, understanding and wisdom" to his post as deputy ambassador to the Republic of Vietnam.

== Family ==
Eugene Locke married Adele Nell Neely on Oct. 27, 1941, in Dallas, Texas, and they had three children: Aimee Marie, John Patrick, and Thomas Neely. After her husband’s death in Dallas on April 28, 1972, from a malignant brain tumor, Adele Neely Locke became a fundraiser for the American Cancer Society through giving talks about Asia and her experiences in the diplomatic corps. She was the National Democratic Committewoman from Texas in 1964 and was the first woman elected to the board of directors of Mercantile National Bank in Dallas. She served on the board of visitors of M.D. Anderson Cancer Center in Houston, was a member of the Chancellor’s Council at the University of Texas at Austin, and served on a number of other boards, such as that of the Junior League of Dallas and the Dallas Council on World Affairs. In 1977 she married Dr. William D. Seybold, a Houston surgeon who co-founded the Kelsey-Seybold Clinic. He died in 2004, and she died in Dallas at 94 on Jan. 3, 2014.

Eugene M. Locke was a direct descendant of William Locke, whose older brother, John Locke, fathered the English philosopher John Locke (1632-1704). The philosopher John Locke never married or had children. William’s son, William Locke (or Deacon William Locke), emigrated to America in 1635 at the age of six with his father’s sister, Aunt Sarah Davies (or Davis), age 48 (or 40), and her husband, Nicholas Davies (or Davis), age 40. They landed in Boston on June 7, 1635, on the ship Planter, which had left London on April 2, 1635. They first settled in Charlestown (the oldest neighborhood in Boston) and then in 1642 moved to Woburn, Massachusetts. Deacon William Locke fathered James Locke, and the succession of males leading to Eugene M. Locke after the first James Locke was as follows: another James Locke, John Locke, Moses Locke, James Perry Locke, Maurice Eugene Locke, Eugene Perry Locke, and Eugene M. Locke.

Diplomatic posts
Preceded by Walter P. McConaughy	United States Ambassador to Pakistan; 1966–1967	Succeeded by Benjamin H. Oehlert Jr.
