= Jarrell Independent School District =

School district in Texas, United States

Address
- 108 East Avenue F Jarrell, Texas, 76537; United States

District information
- Grades: PK–12
- Schools: 7
- NCES District ID: 4824600

Students and staff
- Students: 3,713 (2023–2024)
- Teachers: 250.28 (on an FTE basis)
- Student–teacher ratio: 14.84:1

Other information
- Website: www.jarrellisd.org

Jarrell Independent School District (JISD) is a public school district based in Jarrell, Texas. Jarrell Independent School District is a fast-growing public school district in the heart of central Texas. The district is located 30 miles north of Austin, south of Waco, and east of Killeen along the I-35 corridor. It encompasses 84 square miles and currently consists of six campuses.

== History ==
Jarrell's first schoolhouse, built in 1916, was demolished in 2022. Materials from the old building were planned to be used to construct a new administrative building.

== Schools ==
=== High Schools (9–12) ===
- Jarrell High School

=== Middle Schools (6-8) ===
- Jarrell Middle School
- Jarrell Ranch Middle School

=== Elementary Schools (Pre-K-5) ===
- Jarrell Elementary School
- Igo Elementary School
- Double Creek Elementary School
- Berry Creek Elementary School
