= Jarrell, Texas =

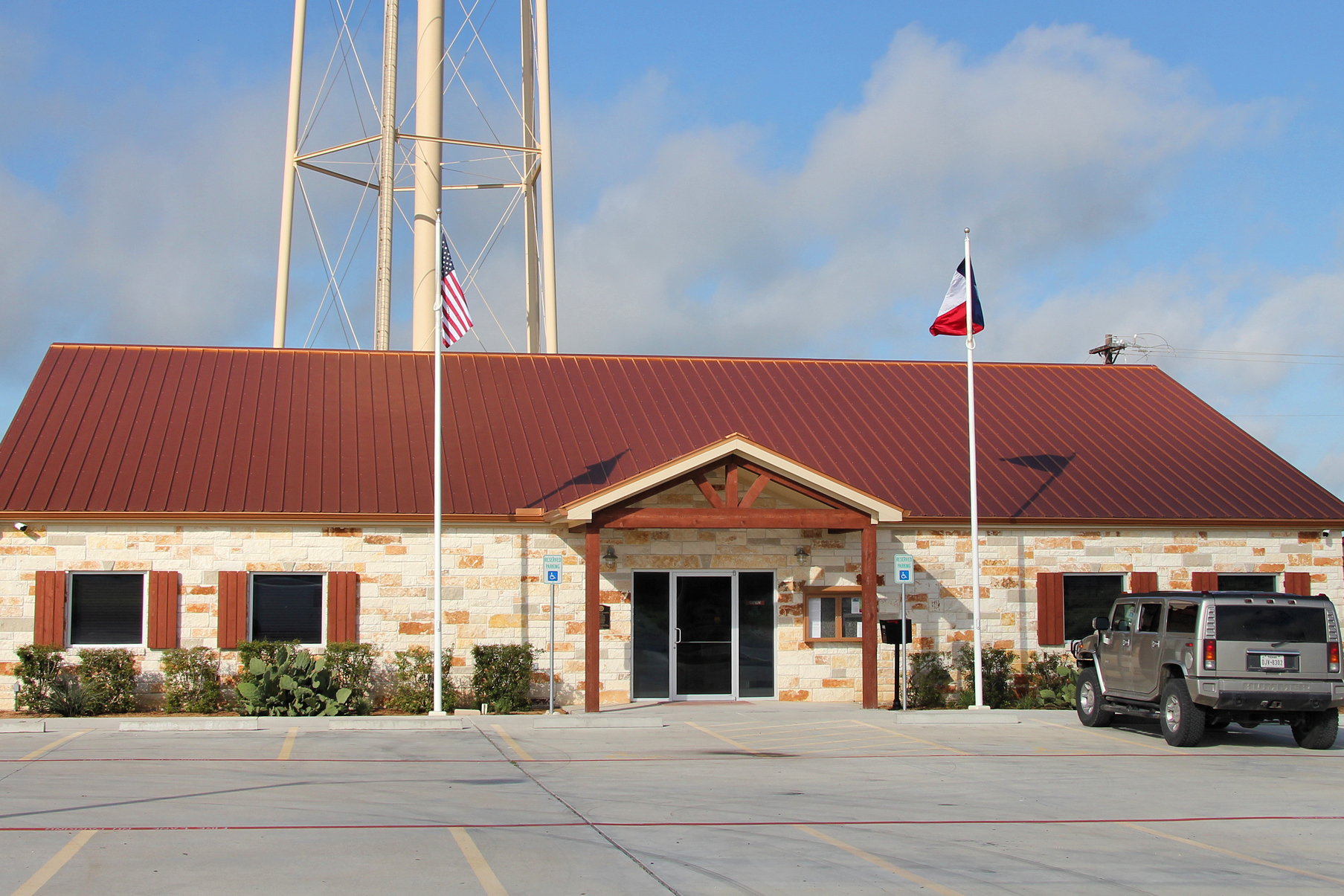
- Jarrell City Hall

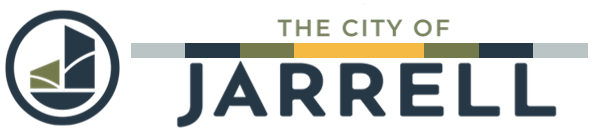
- Logo

- Location in the state of Texas
- Coordinates: 30°49′40″N 97°36′24″W
- Country: United States
- State: Texas
- Counties: Williamson

Government
  - Mayor: Patrick Sherek

Area
  - Total: 2.82 sq mi (7.30 km^{2})
  - Land: 2.80 sq mi (7.26 km^{2})
  - Water: 0.012 sq mi (0.03 km^{2})
- Elevation: 896 ft (273 m)

Population (2020)
  - Total: 1,753
  - Estimate (2025): 5,870
  - Density: 653.2/sq mi (252.19/km^{2})
- Time zone: UTC-6 (CST)
  - Summer (DST): UTC-5 (CDT)
- ZIP code: 76537
- Area code: 512
- FIPS code: 48-37396
- GNIS feature ID: 2410133
- Website: www.cityofjarrell.com

Jarrell is a city in Williamson County, Texas, United States. Its population was 1,753 according to the 2020 census. The city is 17 miles (27 km) north of Georgetown and 24 miles (39 km) from Round Rock; it is incorporated within the Greater Austin statistical metropolitan area.

== History ==
Founded in 1909 by real estate developer O.D. Jarrell, along with E. C. Haeber, the town was settled at the intersection of an old stagecoach road and the Bartlett Western Railroad that was under construction. Soon after the railroad was completed, a saloon, two stores, a post office, and a bank were built. Because of the proximity of Jarrell to the railroad, Jarrell received all of the people and most of the buildings of nearby Corn Hill, Texas, thus killing that town. The city reached a population peak of 500 residents in 1914. The closing of the railway in 1935 and the decline of the cotton industry, however, led to a long-term recession. At one point, Jarrell had only 200 residents. After this low point, the city experienced a recovery that increased its population to 410 by 1990. Over 15 new businesses opened in Jarrell in 2009.

In 2001, Jarrell incorporated as a city. Wayne Cavalier became the first mayor for the City of Jarrell.

== Geography ==
=== Climate ===
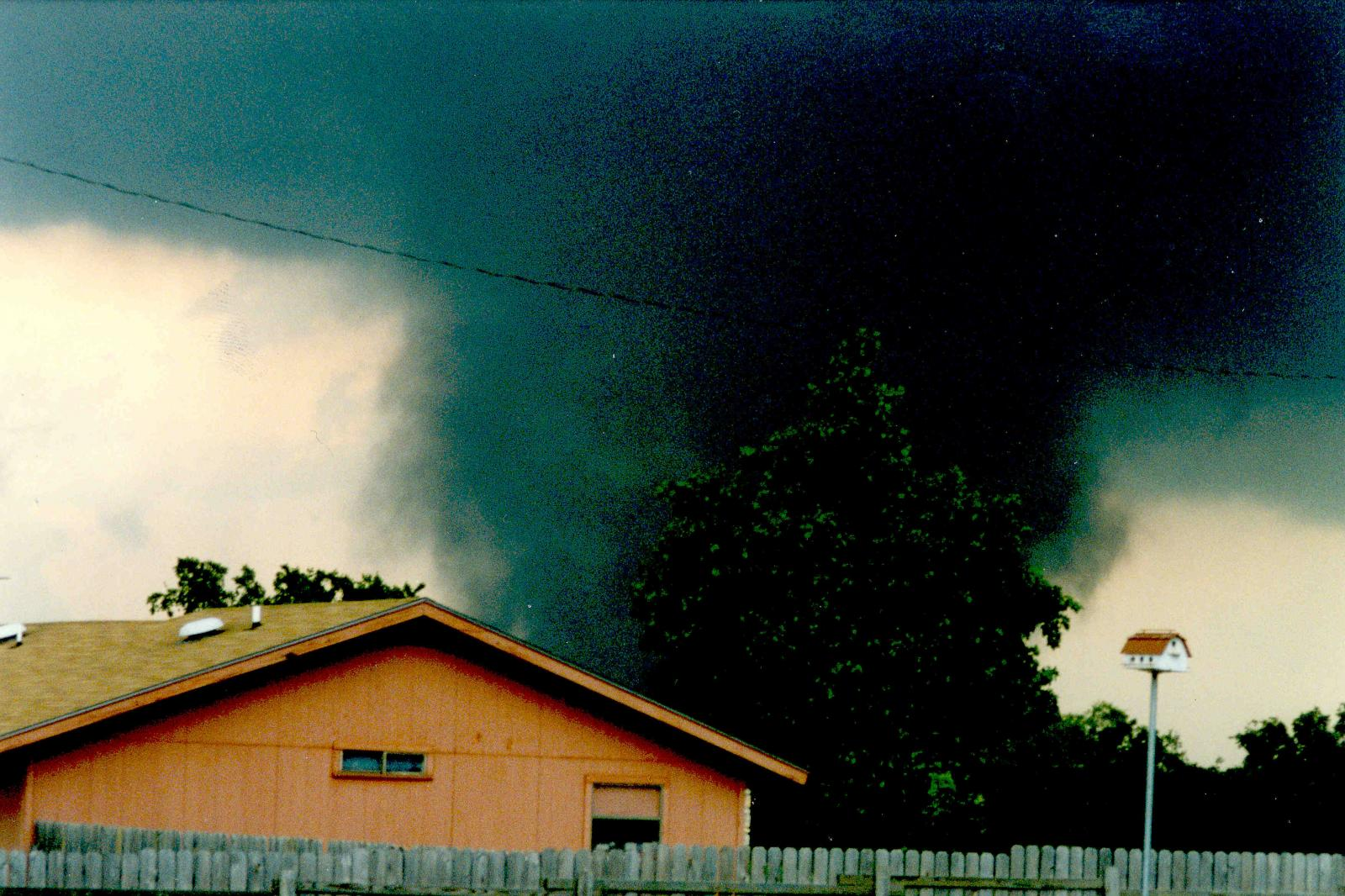
1997 F5 Tornado

The climate in the area is characterized by hot, humid summers and generally mild to cool winters. According to the Köppen climate classification, Jarrell has a humid subtropical climate, Cfa on climate maps.

=== Tornadoes ===
Jarrell has been affected by two major tornadoes in its history. The first one was an F3 that occurred on May 17, 1989, killing one person and injuring 28 people. Damage was incurred mainly on the south side of town. On May 27, 1997, an F5 tornado also known as the dead man walking tornado, devastated the north side of town. The hardest-hit area was the Double Creek Estates subdivision, which was completely obliterated, with all of the homes in the neighborhood being destroyed. Twenty-seven people were killed in this tornado.

== Demographics ==
Historical population
Census	Pop.	Note	%±
2000	459		—
2010	984		114.4%
2020	1,753		78.2%
2025 (est.)	5,870		234.9%
U.S. Decennial Census

=== 2020 census ===
As of the 2020 census, Jarrell had a population of 1,753. The median age was 35.5 years; 26.2% of residents were under 18 and 12.0% of residents were 65 or older. For every 100 females, there were 102.2 males, and for every 100 females 18 and over, there were 102.7 males 18 and over.

About 85.2% of residents lived in urban areas, while 14.8% lived in rural areas.

Of the 617 households in Jarrell, 39.9% had children under 18 living in them, 63.4% were married-couple households, 15.2% were households with a male householder and no spouse or partner present, and 15.7% were households with a female householder and no spouse or partner present. About 17.1% of all households were made up of individuals, and 4.7% had someone living alone who was 65 or older.

Of the 674 housing units, 8.5% were vacant. The homeowner vacancy rate was 3.6% and the rental vacancy rate was 11.0%.

Jarrell racial composition as of 2020 (NH = Non-Hispanic) (Note: Note: the US Census treats Hispanic/Latino as an ethnic category. This table excludes Latinos from the racial categories and assigns them to a separate category. Hispanics/Latinos can be of any race.)
Race	Number	Percentage
White (NH)	981	55.96%
Black or African American (NH)	48	2.74%
Native American or Alaska Native (NH)	8	0.46%
Asian (NH)	12	0.68%
Pacific Islander (NH)	2	0.11%
Some other race (NH)	3	0.17%
Multiracial (NH)	57	3.25%
Hispanic or Latino	642	36.62%
Total	1,753	

== Government ==
Jarrell is a type A general-law city.

== Education ==
Jarrell is served by the Jarrell Independent School District. The district currently has three elementary schools, two middle school, and one high school.

Between 2012 and 2019, student enrollment more than doubled. The district's middle school was built in 2014, but underwent an expansion in 2018–2019 to gain more classroom and science laboratories so that it could better accommodate the growing population of students. The high school is also being expanded, including the addition of a performing arts center.

In 2023, Jarrell ISD formed its own police department.

== Infrastructure ==
Jarrell sits directly along Interstate 35, with access to Ronald Reagan Boulevard.

Emergency services are provided by the Jarrell Fire Department, operating under Williamson County ESD#5.

The Jarrell Police Department was created in 2006. In 2014, Chief Andres Gutierrez was sentenced to 54 months in federal prison and three years of supervised release after pleading guilty to a wire fraud/theft of honest services charge.

== Notable people ==
- Preston Smith, 40th governor of Texas, was born in Corn Hill, which was later absorbed by Jarrell.
