= Benjamin H. Oehlert Jr. =

American businessman and diplomat (1909–1985)

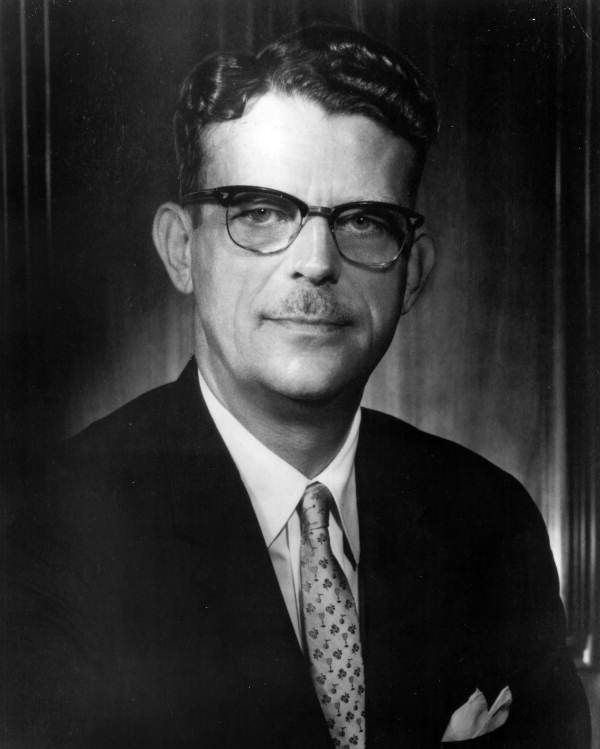
Oehlert as chairman of the Florida Council of 100

Benjamin Hilborn Oehlert Jr. (September 13, 1909 – June 2, 1985) was an American lawyer, business executive, and diplomat. He was a senior vice president of The Coca-Cola Company and was also the United States Ambassador to Pakistan.

== Early life ==
He was born in Philadelphia on September 13, 1909. His parents were Benjamin Hilborn Oehlert Sr. and Sarah Landis Oehlert. He graduated from the Wharton School and the University of Pennsylvania School of Law in 1930 and 1933, respectively.

== Career ==
Upon graduation from law school, Oehlert went into private practice in his hometown. In 1935, Oehlert was hired by the Department of State and worked in the Mexican Claims Agency. Three years later, he joined The Coca-Cola Company. He left Coca-Cola in 1948 for the W. R. Grace and Company, where he was named vice president and Grace National Bank director.

Shortly after W.R. Grace acquired Davison Chemical, Oehlert was named to Davison's board of directors. He returned to Coca-Cola in 1954 and served as president of Coca-Cola subsidiary Minute Maid from 1961 to 1965. By 1967, when he was selected to succeed Eugene M. Locke as ambassador to Pakistan, Oehlert had become senior vice president of The Coca-Cola Company. Oelhert served as ambassador until 1969.

== Personal life ==
Oehlert was married to Alice Naomi Greene from 1937 until her death on November 25, 1984. He died on June 2, 1985, in West Palm Beach, Florida. They had two children, son Benjamin Hilborn Oehlert III and daughter Wendy Howe Oehlert.
