= Natalie Baker =

American diplomat

Natalie Ashton Baker
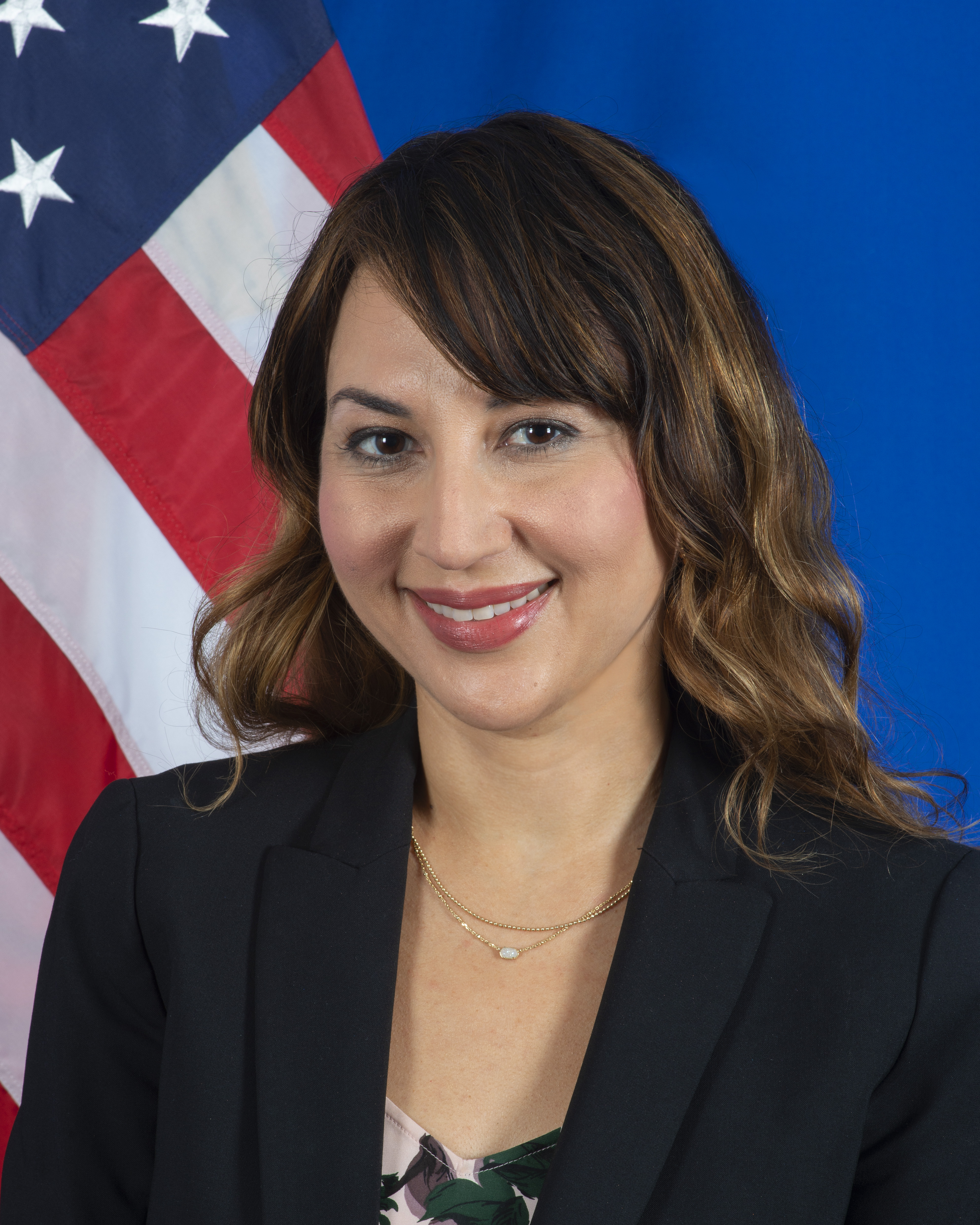
- Official portrait

Chargé d'affaires to Pakistan
- Incumbent
- Assumed office January 10, 2025
- Preceded by: Donald Blome (ambassador)

Personal details
- Education: Princeton University; Harvard University; National War College

Natalie Ashton Baker is an American diplomat who has served as the chargé d'affaires at the United States embassy in Islamabad since January 2025. A minister counselor in the Senior Foreign Service, Baker previously served as the deputy chief of mission at the same embassy.

== Education ==
Baker received her bachelor's degree from Princeton University and holds a master's degree in public policy from Harvard University. She is a graduate of the National War College at the National Defense University. Baker speaks Arabic, Persian, Spanish, and Russian.

== Career ==
From 2009 to 2011, Baker served as political and economic counselor in Libya, as the relationship between the two countries was thawing after nearly three decades of strain. She remained there until February 2011, when the Libyan Revolution forced the embassy there to close.

From August 2021 to July 2024, she served as deputy chief of mission at the US embassy in Doha. Before that, she had been serving as the director of the Office of North African Affairs in the State Department's Near Eastern Affairs Bureau.

Baker has been assigned as a special assistant in the Bureau of Near Eastern Affairs, as a consular officer in Islamabad, and as a cultural affairs officer in Ashgabat. Her other assignments include deputy chief of mission and chargé d'affaires in Libya, deputy director of the Iran Regional Presence Office at the US consulate in Dubai, and economic counselor at the US embassy in Kuwait, where she worked with the Department of Defense to help with the withdrawal of US troops from Iraq.

=== Pakistan ===
In August 2024, Baker arrived in Islamabad as the deputy chief of mission. Upon the departure of Donald Blome, she was appointed chargé d'affaires at the mission in January 2025.

She has worked to launch several projects in Pakistan, such as a new building of the United States Educational Foundation, and has coordinated with Pakistani government officials and business executives to promote American investment and jobs.

==== Strategic metals agreement ====
On September 8, 2025, Baker oversaw the signing of two memoranda of understanding between US Strategic Metals and Pakistan's Frontier Works Organization. Speaking on the occasion, she called the signing of the agreement "another example of the strength of the US-Pakistan bilateral relationship that will benefit both countries." US Strategic Metals invested $500 million in Pakistan's rare earth elements and critical minerals under the agreement.

==== Iran war ====
Baker has appreciated Pakistan's diplomatic efforts during the 2026 Iran war on multiple occasions. She received US vice president JD Vance on 11 April 2026 upon his arrival in Islamabad during the negotiations between the US and Iran. She had been assured of "foolproof" security measures for the visiting delegation by Pakistani interior minister Mohsin Naqvi a day earlier.

On 5 August, she met defence minister Khawaja Asif to discuss the regional and international security situation and ways to enhance cooperation between the two countries.

==== Freedom 250 ====
On the occasion of the 250th anniversary celebrations of America, Baker praised the United States' relationship with Pakistan, with the mission expressing gratitude to the Pakistani government for celebrating the anniversary. Several landmarks in the country were illuminated in the colors of the US flag, including the Pakistan National Monument and Globe Chowk on the Constitution Avenue.

==== Agricultural cooperation ====
On August 6, 2026, Baker highlighted America's commitment to furthering cooperation on agricultural technology with Pakistan while speaking during a webinar organized by the Business Council for International Understanding in collaboration with the US embassy, the government of Pakistan, and the US Department of Commerce. She noted that access to American technology would generate opportunities for US firms and make Pakistan's agricultural sector more productive, efficient, and sustainable.

==== Meetings with provincial heads of government ====
On 25 April 2025, Baker met Sindh chief minister Murad Ali Shah to discuss a range of matters, including climate change, agricultural cooperation, and flood-relief efforts.

On 9 June 2026, she, along with consul general Kristin K. Hawkins, met Punjab chief minister Maryam Nawaz, who appreciated the US mission's support for Lahore Qalandars in the Pakistan Super League, expressed solidarity with California (a sister state of Punjab), and praised the efforts of the Pakistani-American community. On 12 August 2026, she met Maryam again to discuss affairs related to security, education, and investment.

==== August 2026 demarche ====
In response to Sergio Gor's remarks on the disputed Kashmir region describing it as "an important part of India", Pakistan issued a "strong demarche" to Baker and summoned her to its Ministry of Foreign Affairs, "categorically" rejecting the description of the territory as belonging to India and appreciating Trump's offer for mediation in the Kashmir dispute after the 2025 India-Pakistan conflict.

== See also ==
- List of ambassadors of the United States to Pakistan
- Pakistan–United States relations
