= 1964 Texas lieutenant gubernatorial election =

- November 3, 1964
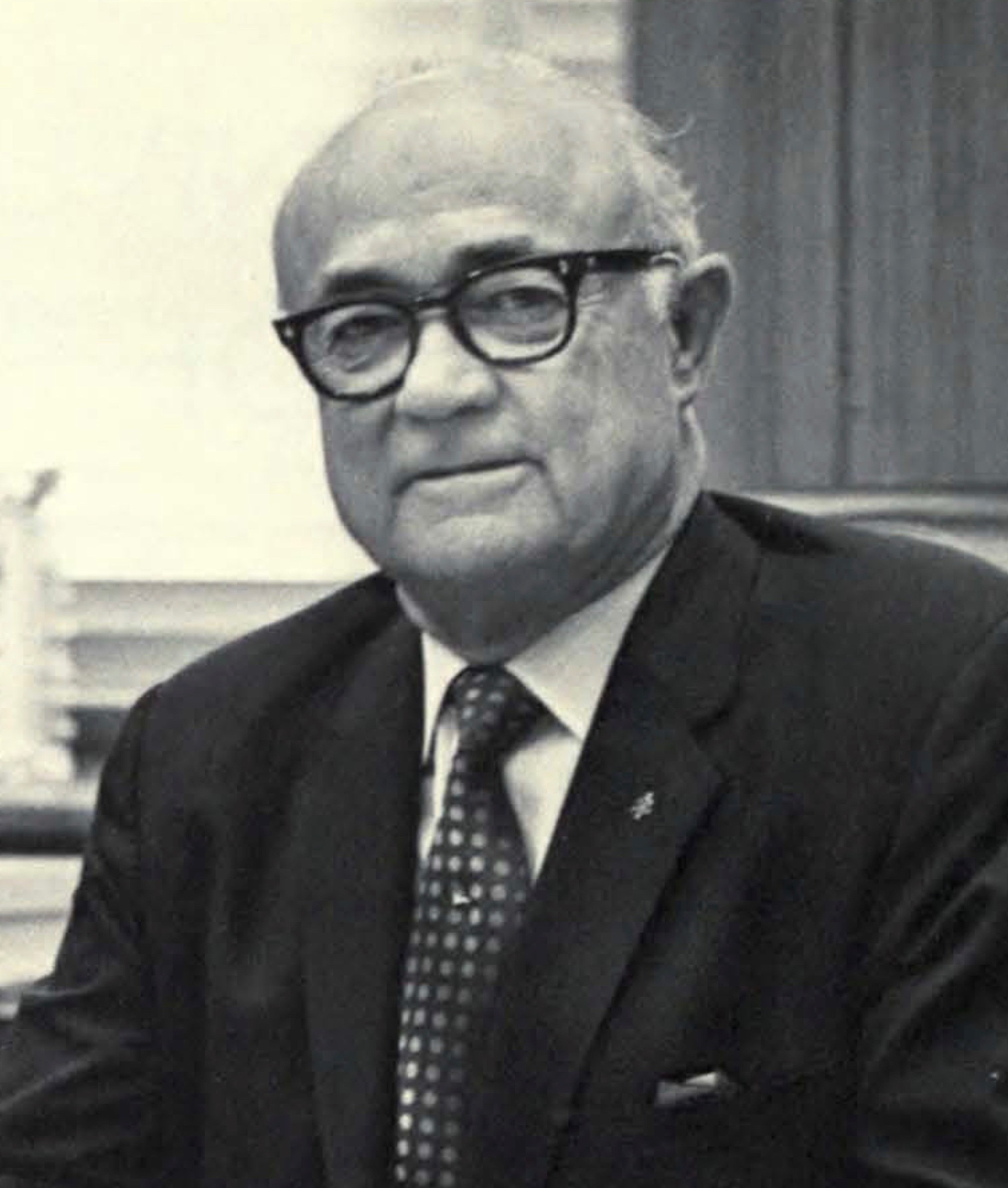

Nominee	Preston Smith	Horace Houston
Party	Democratic	Republican
Popular vote	1,827,806	652,170
Percentage	73.56%	26.25%
- County results Smith: 50–60% 60–70% 70–80% 80–90% >90%
Lieutenant Governor before election
Preston Smith
Democratic
Elected Lieutenant Governor
Preston Smith
Democratic

The 1964 Texas lieutenant gubernatorial election was held on November 3, 1964, in order to elect the lieutenant governor of Texas. Incumbent Democratic lieutenant governor Preston Smith defeated Republican nominee Horace Houston.

== General election ==
On election day, November 3, 1964, incumbent Democratic lieutenant governor Preston Smith won re-election by a margin of 1,175,636 votes against his opponent Republican nominee Horace Houston, thereby retaining Democratic control over the office of lieutenant governor. Smith was sworn in for his second term on January 19, 1965.

=== Results ===
Texas lieutenant gubernatorial election, 1964
Party	Candidate	Votes	%
Democratic	Preston Smith (incumbent)	1,827,806	73.56
Republican	Horace Houston	652,170	26.25
	Scattering	4,824	0.19
Total votes		2,484,800	100.00
Democratic hold			
