= 1966 Texas lieutenant gubernatorial election =

- November 8, 1966
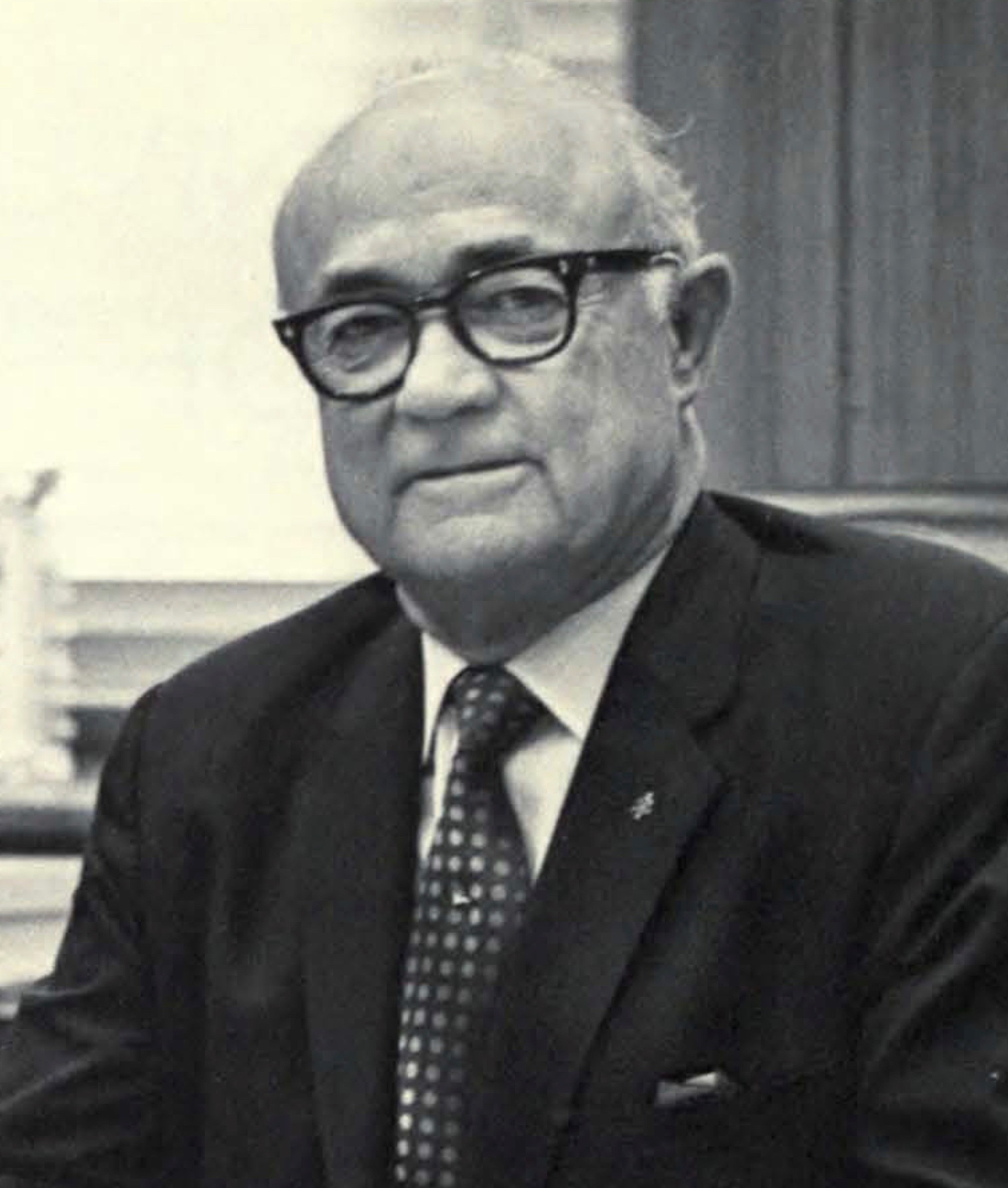

Nominee	Preston Smith	Kellis Dibrell
Party	Democratic	Republican
Popular vote	1,003,237	392,164
Percentage	71.16%	27.82%
- County results Smith: 50–60% 60–70% 70–80% 80–90% >90% Dibrell: 50–60%
Lieutenant Governor before election
Preston Smith
Democratic
Elected Lieutenant Governor
Preston Smith
Democratic

The 1966 Texas lieutenant gubernatorial election was held on November 8, 1966, in order to elect the lieutenant governor of Texas. Incumbent Democratic lieutenant governor Preston Smith defeated Republican nominee Kellis Dibrell and Constitution nominee William A. Johnson.

== General election ==
On election day, November 8, 1966, incumbent Democratic lieutenant governor Preston Smith won re-election by a margin of 611,073 votes against his foremost opponent Republican nominee Kellis Dibrell, thereby retaining Democratic control over the office of lieutenant governor. Smith was sworn in for his third term on January 17, 1967.

=== Results ===
Texas lieutenant gubernatorial election, 1966
Party	Candidate	Votes	%
Democratic	Preston Smith (incumbent)	1,003,237	71.16
Republican	Kellis Dibrell	392,164	27.82
Constitution	William A. Johnson	14,400	1.02
	Scattering	4	0.00
Total votes		1,409,805	100.00
Democratic hold			
