= 1962 Texas lieutenant gubernatorial election =

- November 6, 1962
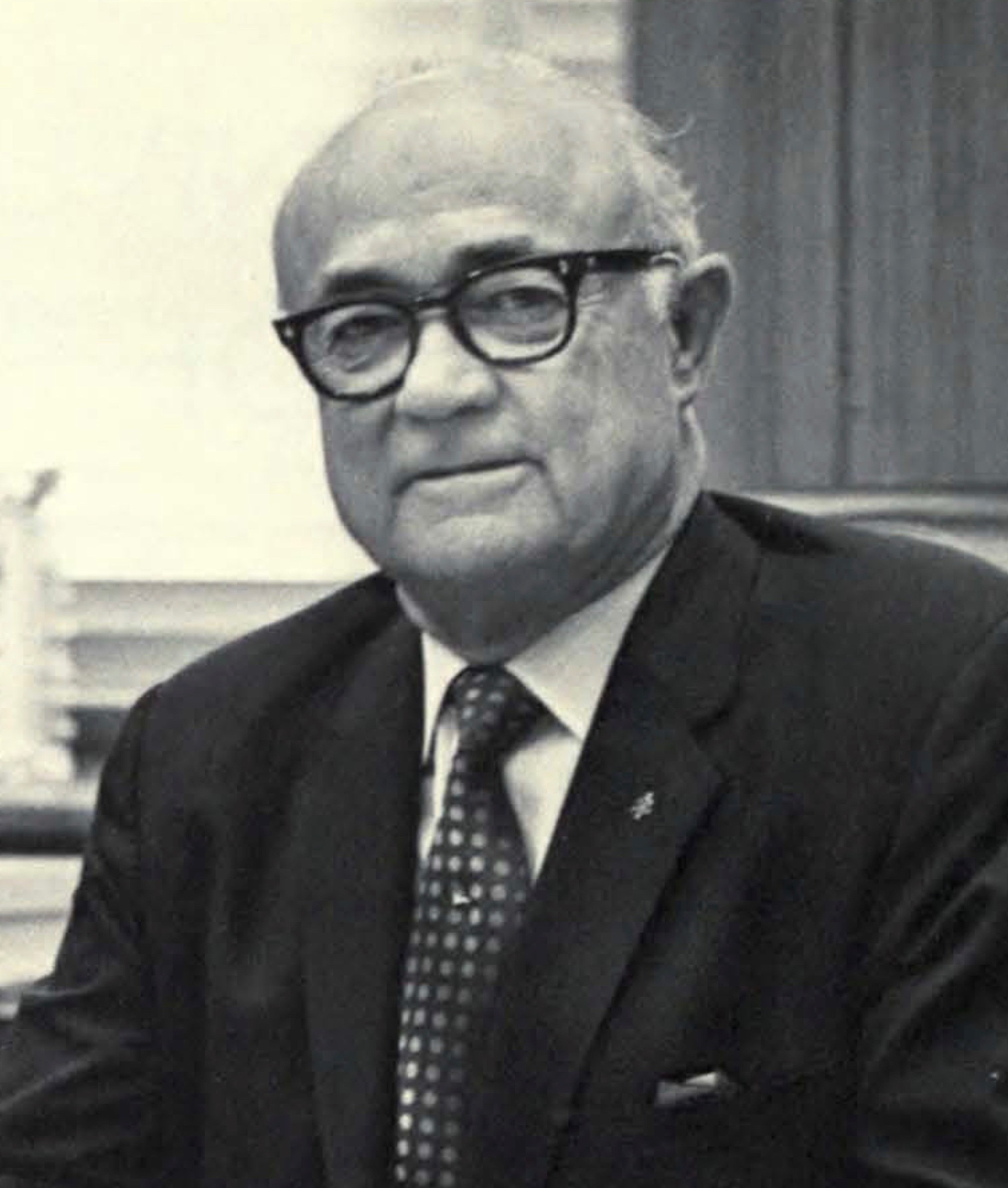

Nominee	Preston Smith	O. W. Hayes
Party	Democratic	Republican
Popular vote	937,377	612,568
Percentage	60.48%	39.52%
- County results Smith: 50–60% 60–70% 70–80% 80–90% >90% Hayes: 50–60% 60–70%
Lieutenant Governor before election
Vacant
Elected Lieutenant Governor
Preston Smith
Democratic

The 1962 Texas lieutenant gubernatorial election was held on November 6, 1962, in order to elect the lieutenant governor of Texas. Democratic nominee and incumbent member of the Texas Senate Preston Smith defeated Republican nominee O. W. Hayes.

== General election ==
On election day, November 6, 1962, Democratic nominee Preston Smith won the election by a margin of 324,809 votes against his opponent Republican nominee O. W. Hayes, thereby retaining Democratic control over the office of lieutenant governor. Smith was sworn in as the 35th lieutenant governor of Texas on January 15, 1963.

=== Results ===
Texas lieutenant gubernatorial election, 1962
Party	Candidate	Votes	%
Democratic	Preston Smith	937,377	60.48
Republican	O. W. Hayes	612,568	39.52
Total votes		1,549,945	100.00
Democratic hold			
