= Corn Hill, Texas =

Unincorporated Community in Williamson County, Texas

Coordinates: 30°48′25″N 97°36′54″W

Corn Hill was an unincorporated community in Williamson County, Texas. Corn Hill was located at the intersection of present day Interstate 35 and Willis Creek.

== History ==
Corn Hill was settled in 1855 by Judge John E. King. The site was selected to be a stop along the stagecoach road between Georgetown, Texas, and Fort Gates. There were as many as 500 residents living in Corn Hill by 1910.

=== Bartlett Western Railroad ===
In 1909 the Bartlett Western Railroad was set to bypass Corn Hill, two miles to the north. With the bypassing of Corn Hill, a new town called Jarrell was built nearby Corn Hill along the site of the proposed Bartlett Western Railroad. Over the next two decades residents of Corn Hill moved to their homes to Jarrell and by 1973 the only building left standing in Corn Hill was a hotel. A nearby unincorporated community exists today named New Corn Hill, where some of the original residents of Corn Hill reported to have settled.

== Notable people ==
- Preston Smith, 40th Governor of Texas: born in Corn Hill, which later was absorbed by Jarrell.
