= Paul H. Alling =

American diplomat (1896–1949)

Paul Humiston Alling (July 15, 1896 – January 18, 1949) was an American diplomat.

== Early life ==
Alling was born in Hamden, Connecticut and attended Trinity College before earning a master's degree from the University of Pennsylvania. He served in the United States Army from 1917 to 1919, then returned home to work for the National City Bank of New York and the Federal Reserve Bank of Philadelphia.

== Diplomatic career ==
Alling joined the Foreign Service in 1924, and was posted to Beirut, Aleppo, and Damascus. He was nominated as the Consul General of the U.S. Legation at Tangier, Morocco on June 4, 1945. Alling was named the first United States Ambassador to Pakistan in September 1947, and presented his credentials the following February. He died at the Naval Medical Center Bethesda on January 18, 1949.

Diplomatic posts
Preceded by post created	United States Ambassador to Pakistan; 1947–1948	Succeeded by H. Merle Cochran
