= List of ambassadors of the United States to Pakistan =

Ambassador of the United States to Pakistan پاکستان میں امریکا کے سفیر
- Seal of the United States Department of State

- Flag of a United States ambassador

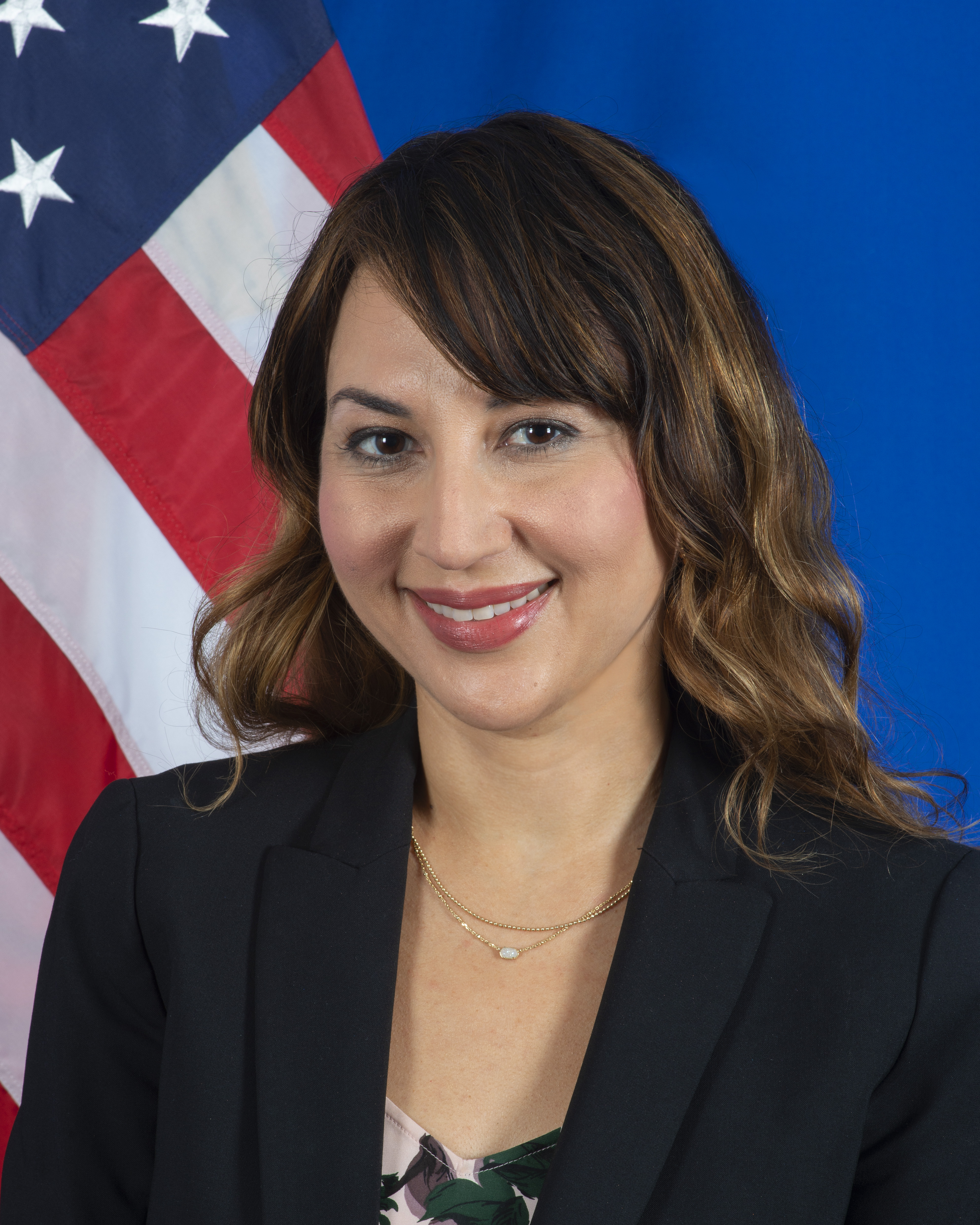
- Incumbent; Natalie A. Baker; Chargé d'affaires since January 10, 2025
- Nominator: The president of the United States
- Appointer: The president; with Senate advice and consent
- Inaugural holder: Paul H. Alling as Ambassador Extraordinary and Plenipotentiary
- Formation: September 20, 1947
- Website: U.S. Embassy - Islamabad

The U.S. embassy in Karachi was established August 15, 1947, with Edward W. Holmes as Chargé d'Affaires ad interim, pending the appointment of an ambassador. The first ambassador, Paul H. Alling, was appointed on September 20, 1947. Anne W. Patterson was nominated as United States Ambassador to Pakistan in May 2007, replacing Ryan C. Crocker who was appointed United States Ambassador to Iraq after completing three years of service in Pakistan. In 2010, her post was succeeded by Cameron Munter. The American ambassador is based in the U.S. Embassy, Islamabad.

== Ambassadors ==
Name	Title	Appointed	Presented credentials	Terminated mission	Notes
Paul H. Alling – Career FSO	Ambassador Extraordinary and Plenipotentiary	September 20, 1947	February 26, 1948	June 27, 1948	
Avra M. Warren – Career FSO	Ambassador Extraordinary and Plenipotentiary	February 2, 1950	February 25, 1950	November 26, 1952	
Horace A. Hildreth – Political appointee	Ambassador Extraordinary and Plenipotentiary	May 13, 1953	May 19, 1953	May 1, 1957	
James M. Langley – Political appointee	Ambassador Extraordinary and Plenipotentiary	June 13, 1957	July 27, 1957	July 29, 1959	
William M. Rountree – Career FSO	Ambassador Extraordinary and Plenipotentiary	June 18, 1959	August 17, 1959	February 7, 1962	The capital of Pakistan was moved to Islamabad in August 1960.
Walter P. McConaughy – Career FSO	Ambassador Extraordinary and Plenipotentiary	March 1, 1962	March 20, 1962	May 27, 1966	
Eugene Murphy Locke – Political appointee	Ambassador Extraordinary and Plenipotentiary	May 27, 1966	June 9, 1966	April 16, 1967	
Benjamin H. Oehlert, Jr. – Political appointee	Ambassador Extraordinary and Plenipotentiary	July 27, 1967	August 16, 1967	June 17, 1969	
Joseph S. Farland – Political appointee	Ambassador Extraordinary and Plenipotentiary	September 19, 1969	November 15, 1969	April 30, 1972	The post was vacant May 1972–December 1973. Sidney Sober served as chargé d'affaires ad interim during that period
Henry A. Byroade – Career FSO	Ambassador Extraordinary and Plenipotentiary	October 15, 1973	December 5, 1973	April 23, 1977	
Arthur W. Hummel, Jr. – Career FSO	Ambassador Extraordinary and Plenipotentiary	June 8, 1977	June 28, 1977	July 19, 1981	
Ronald I. Spiers – Career FSO	Ambassador Extraordinary and Plenipotentiary	October 1, 1981	October 29, 1981	October 27, 1983	
Deane Roesch Hinton – Career FSO	Ambassador Extraordinary and Plenipotentiary	November 21, 1983	December 26, 1983	November 9, 1986	
Arnold Lewis Raphel – Career FSO	Ambassador Extraordinary and Plenipotentiary	May 4, 1987	June 24, 1987	Died in office, August 17, 1988	
Robert B. Oakley – Career FSO	Ambassador Extraordinary and Plenipotentiary	August 18, 1988	September 1, 1988	August 29, 1991	
Nicholas Platt – Career FSO	Ambassador Extraordinary and Plenipotentiary	July 2, 1991	October 24, 1991	November 3, 1992	
John Cameron Monjo – Career FSO	Ambassador Extraordinary and Plenipotentiary	October 9, 1992	November 10, 1992	September 10, 1995	
Thomas W. Simons – Career FSO	Ambassador Extraordinary and Plenipotentiary	December 19, 1995	January 25, 1996	August 24, 1998	
William B. Milam – Career FSO	Ambassador Extraordinary and Plenipotentiary	August 3, 1998	September 10, 1998	July 6, 2001	
Wendy Jean Chamberlin – Career FSO	Ambassador Extraordinary and Plenipotentiary	July 12, 2001	September 13, 2001	May 29, 2002	
Nancy Jo Powell – Career FSO	Ambassador Extraordinary and Plenipotentiary	August 2, 2002	August 16, 2002	November 5, 2004	
Ryan C. Crocker – Career FSO	Ambassador Extraordinary and Plenipotentiary	October 18, 2004	November 25, 2004	March 28, 2007	
Anne W. Patterson – Career FSO	Ambassador Extraordinary and Plenipotentiary	July 2, 2007	July 31, 2007	October 5, 2010	
Cameron Munter – Career FSO	Ambassador Extraordinary and Plenipotentiary	October 6, 2010	October 27, 2010	May 7, 2012	
Richard Olson – Career FSO	Ambassador Extraordinary and Plenipotentiary	September 24, 2012	October 31, 2012	October 27, 2015	
David Hale – Career FSO	Ambassador Extraordinary and Plenipotentiary	September 21, 2015	December 3, 2015	August 29, 2018	
John Hoover – Career FSO	Chargé d'Affaires ad interim	August 29, 2018		September 22, 2018	
Paul W. Jones – Career FSO	Chargé d'Affaires ad interim	September 22, 2018		August 31, 2020	
Angela Aggeler – Career FSO	Chargé d'Affaires ad interim	September 1, 2020		May 23, 2022	
Donald Blome – Career FSO	Ambassador Extraordinary and Plenipotentiary	March 1, 2022	July 1, 2022	January 10, 2025	
Natalie A. Baker – Career FSO	Chargé d'Affaires ad interim	January 10, 2025		Present	

== See also ==
- Embassy of the United States, Islamabad
- Pakistan – United States relations
- Foreign relations of Pakistan
- Ambassadors of the United States
