= Kilmer B. Corbin =

American politician and attorney

Member of the Texas Senate from the Now 28th district
- In office January 11, 1949 – January 8, 1957
- Preceded by: Keith F. Kelly
- Succeeded by: Preston E. Smith

Personal details
- Born: Kilmer Blaine Corbin; June 18, 1919 Lampasas County, Texas, US
- Died: January 7, 1993 (aged 73)
- Party: Democratic
- Children: 3, including Barry
- Education: Lamesa High School Texas Tech University University of Texas at Austin
- Profession: Attorney

Kilmer Blaine Corbin (June 18, 1919 – January 7, 1993), was an American politician and attorney who served in the Texas State Senate from 1949 to 1957.

Corbin was the father of actor Barry Corbin.

Texas Senate
Preceded by Keith F. Kelly	Texas State Senator from current District 28 (Lubbock and part of West Texas); 1949–1957	Succeeded by Preston E. Smith
