= 1968 Texas gubernatorial election =

- November 5, 1968
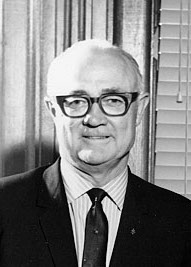

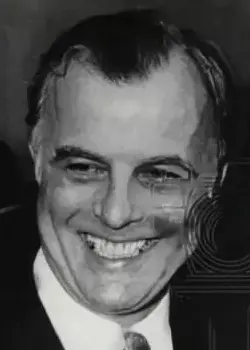
Nominee	Preston Smith	Paul Eggers
Party	Democratic	Republican
Popular vote	1,662,019	1,254,333
Percentage	56.99%	43.01%
- County results Smith: 50–60% 60–70% 70–80% 80–90% >90% Eggers: 50–60% 60–70% 70–80%
Governor before election
John Connally
Democratic
Elected Governor
Preston Smith
Democratic

The 1968 Texas gubernatorial election was held on November 5, 1968, to elect the governor of Texas. Incumbent Democratic governor John Connally did not run for reelection to a fourth term, so the election pitted Democrat Preston Smith against Republican Paul Eggers. Smith was easily elected, winning 57% of the vote to Eggers' 43%.

== Democratic primary ==
=== Candidates ===
- Dolph Briscoe, former state representative from Uvalde
- Waggoner Carr, former Texas attorney general and nominee for U.S. Senate in 1966
- Johnnie Mae Hackwhorthe
- John Hill, Texas Secretary of State
- Eugene M. Locke, Dallas attorney and deputy U.S. Ambassador to South Vietnam
- Preston Smith, Lieutenant Governor
- Alfonso Veloz
- Edward L. Whittenburg
- Don Yarborough, Houston attorney and candidate for governor in 1962 and 1964

=== Results ===
1968 Democratic gubernatorial primary
Party	Candidate	Votes	%
Democratic	Don Yarborough	421,607	24.08%
Democratic	Preston Smith	386,875	22.10%
Democratic	Waggoner Carr	257,543	14.71%
Democratic	Dolph Briscoe	225,686	12.89%
Democratic	Eugene Locke	218,118	12.46%
Democratic	John Hill	154,908	8.85%
Democratic	Pat O'Daniel	47,912	2.74%
Democratic	Edward L. Whittenburg	22,957	1.31%
Democratic	Alfonso Veloz	9,562	0.55%
Democratic	Johnnie Mae Hackwhorthe	5,484	0.31%
Total votes		1,750,652	100.00%

=== Runoff ===
1968 Democratic gubernatorial runoff
Party	Candidate	Votes	%
Democratic	Preston Smith	767,490	55.27%
Democratic	Don Yarborough	621,226	44.73%
Total votes		1,388,716	100.00%

== Republican primary ==
=== Results ===
1968 Republican gubernatorial primary
Party	Candidate	Votes	%
Republican	Paul Eggers	65,501	62.52%
Republican	John Trice	28,849	27.54%
Republican	Wallace Sisk	10,415	9.94%
Total votes		104,765	100.00%

== Results ==
General election results
Party	Candidate	Votes	%
Democratic	Preston Smith	1,662,019	56.99%
Republican	Paul Eggers	1,254,333	43.01%
Total votes		2,916,352	100.00%
Democratic hold			
