= Mortgage (disambiguation) =

A mortgage is a loan secured by a mortgage on real property.

Mortgage may also refer to:

- Mortgage, a security interest on real property grant to a lender, as in mortgage law
- Chattel mortgage
- Deed, the mortgage document
- Hypothec, a species of encumbrance
- Mortgage (film), a 1990 Australian drama film
- "Mortgage" (Not Going Out), a 2007 television episode

== See also ==
- Security interest
