= Metalogenia =

Spanish machinery corporation

Metalogenia SA
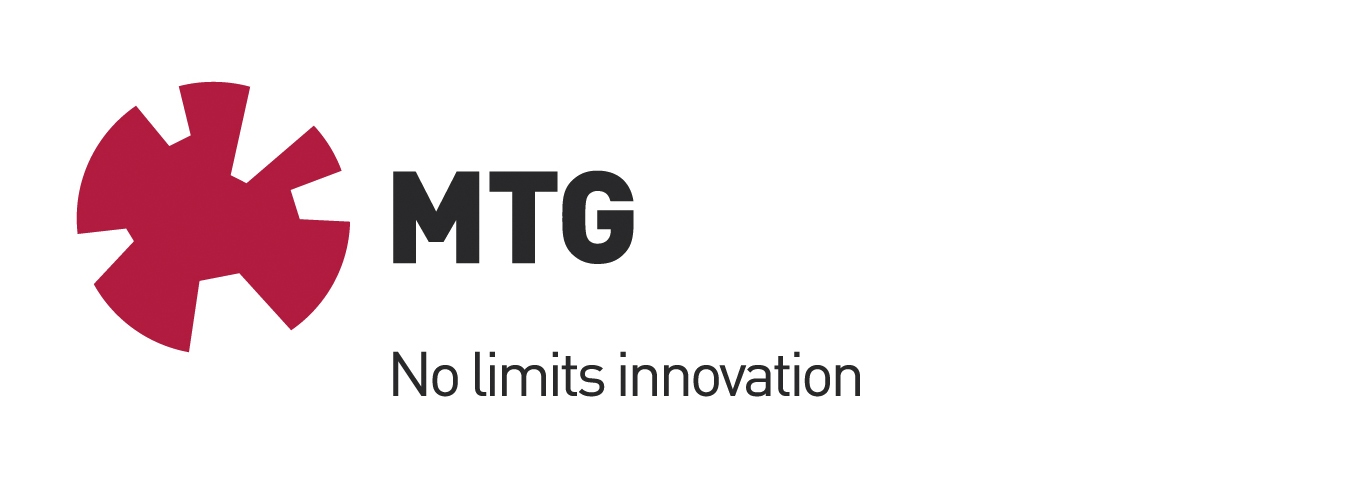
- Company type: Private
- Industry: Manufacturing
- Founded: 1957
- Headquarters: Monzón, Aragón, Spain
- Key people: Francisco Triginer, Chairman
- Products: Wear parts for industrial applications
- Website: mtgcorp.com

Metalogenia SA, also known as MTG, is a Spanish international corporation which designs, manufactures and markets protection systems and wear parts (GET) for earthmoving machinery within multiple industrial applications such as mining, construction and dredging. MTG's products are sold to customers via a worldwide network of over 300 dealers throughout 60 countries. This privately held company was founded in 1957 and has its headquarters in Barcelona, Spain. MTG currently has over 280 employees around the world, and has expanded its presence overseas with offices and a warehouse in Houston, a sales branch in Shanghai and Chile and a production plant in Monzón, Spain. The company produces ground engaging tools such as patented cast steel tooth and adapters systems, as well as blade protectors for earthmoving, ground-engaging and rock-loading applications.

== History ==
=== Origins ===
Metalogenia was founded on July 4, 1957, by the Triginer family as a local source of steel castings. During its first 12 years, Metalogenia was a non-specialist foundry, until the company took over a tooth distributor called REMOP in 1969 and started specialising in manufacturing wear products for earthmoving machinery.

=== Specialisation ===
During the 70s, the company became a supplier for European manufacturers of public works machinery such as Poclain. In the 80s, Metalogenia was a sole licence holder to manufacture patented products for consumables brands of wear materials such as Fiatallis.

=== The MTG brand ===
The company's technological development during the 80s made it possible to redesign manufacturing processes in the 90s. MTG's new product designs were adapted to suit a variety of applications, and in 1997 Metalogenia launched its own brand, MTG. A year later, MTG Systems FixMet (1998) was launched and soon after the new MTG Systems KingMet product range (2000). Both were awarded a number of international prizes.

=== Internationalization ===
In 1999, the company expanded operations in US and set up its subsidiary MTG North America Corporation in Houston, Texas. The 2000s started with the acquisition of the Quality Management System (ISO 9001) and the Environmental Management System (ISO 14001) certifications (2001). Also, during this decade the new generation of Hammerless GET products was launched: MTG Systems StarMet, ProMet and RipMet, and the new MTG twist locking system, which received an innovation award at Intermat 2006.

=== New challenges ===
In 2013, MTG launched MTG PRO, the first iPad application of the sector of wear parts for earth moving machinery. With this iPad app, MTG became the first company in the GET sector to connect its own network of Professional users through an iPad platform. MTG PRO was also shortlisted as one of the world's top 100 mobile marketing campaigns of 2014 by the Mobile Marketing Association, and was selected as a finalist within the "Mobile Search" category at the MMA Global 2014 Smarties awards. In February 2015, the company launched a new version of the MTG PRO app optimised for iPhone mobile devices, and in September 2016 the MTG PRO app was made available for Android devices.

=== Technological development ===
In 2013 the company opened a new manufacturing plant in Monzón, Spain and presented the MTG tour guide iPad app, a new interactive tool aimed at guiding the Monzón plant visitors throughout the factory - using augmented reality, 3D computer graphics and video technology to explain the complete production process for MTG products.

This foundry has more than 12,000 square meters, has increased the annual production of wear parts as well as the company's product range. Furthermore, the plant is specifically equipped to develop and manufacture GET material for the mining sector. The Monzón plant project was presented in 2008 and represented an investment of 37 million euros as well as the creation of 150 new jobs in the area. In this context of technological development, particularly within the mining and dredging sectors, MTG launched, during 2013, the new Rope Shovels system for cable shovels and the new Promet II range of lip and wing protectors for buckets.

In July 2015 MTG introduced a new bucket protection system for underground mining LHD machines. Moreover, in September 2015 the company presented its new three part GET hammerless system (Twinmet) for hydraulic excavators over 350 tonnes, used in mining applications. MTG also showcased its latest cutting solutions for the dredging market, DMet, at the Europort exhibition celebrated in November 2015 in Rotterdam, Netherlands. Furthermore, the company is also planning to develop a complete cast lip system for mining buckets that will feature its three part Twinmet hammerless locking system.

== Products ==
Ground Engaging Tools (GET) "are specially designed sacrificial pieces of metal that have two main purposes: increasing machine productivity and protecting the more expensive structural components from wear. The term covers components such as teeth, shrouds and cutting edges that are used on a range of mining machinery".

MTG manufactures tooth-adapter systems designed to increase the productivity of machines such as excavators, loaders, shovels and dozers as well as lip and wing shrouds, and corner heel shrouds that can be used on loaders and excavators within the sectors of mining, construction and dredging.
