= Preston Smith (Texas politician) =

Governor of Texas from 1969 to 1973

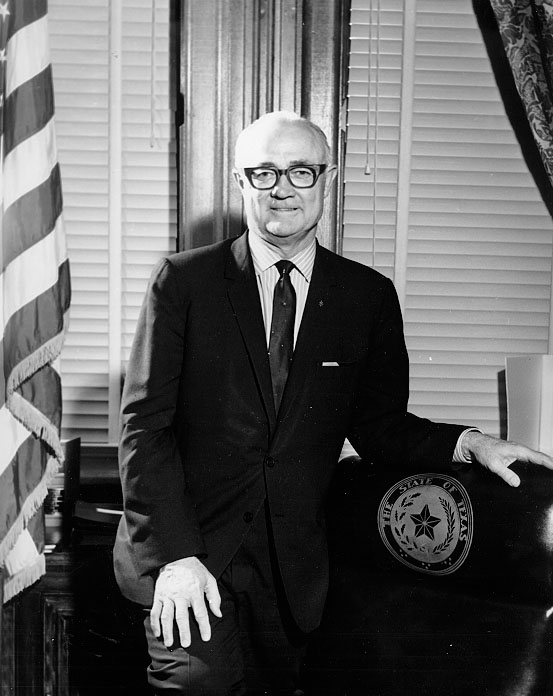
- Smith in 1969

40th Governor of Texas
- In office January 21, 1969 – January 16, 1973
- Lieutenant: Ben Barnes
- Preceded by: John Connally
- Succeeded by: Dolph Briscoe

35th Lieutenant Governor of Texas
- In office January 15, 1963 – January 21, 1969
- Governor: John Connally
- Preceded by: Ben Ramsey
- Succeeded by: Ben Barnes

Member of the Texas Senate from the 28th district
- In office January 8, 1957 – January 8, 1963
- Preceded by: Kilmer B. Corbin
- Succeeded by: H. J. "Doc" Blanchard

Member of the Texas House of Representatives from the 119th district
- In office January 9, 1945 – January 9, 1951
- Preceded by: Hop Hasley
- Succeeded by: Waggoner Carr

Personal details
- Born: Preston Earnest Smith; March 8, 1912 Corn Hill, Texas, U.S.
- Died: October 18, 2003 (aged 91) Lubbock, Texas, U.S.
- Resting place: Texas State Cemetery
- Party: Democratic
- Spouse: Ima Mae Smith (m. 1935; died 1998)
- Children: 2
- Education: Texas Tech University (BBA)
- Occupation: Politician; entrepreneur

Preston Earnest Smith (March 8, 1912 – October 18, 2003) was an American entrepreneur and politician who served as the 40th governor of Texas from 1969 to 1973. A conservative member of the Democratic Party, he previously served as the 35th lieutenant governor from 1963 to 1969. He was elected to the Texas House of Representatives in 1945 and served until 1951 and to the Texas Senate in 1957.

== Early life ==
Smith was born into a tenant farming family of 13 children in Corn Hill, a town in Williamson County, Texas, that has since been absorbed into nearby Jarrell. The family later moved to Lamesa, Texas, where Smith graduated in 1928 from Lamesa High School. He started his first service station while in college, to help pay his way through. In 1934, he graduated from Texas Technological College (now Texas Tech University) in Lubbock with a bachelor's degree in business administration. Staying in Lubbock, he founded a movie theater business and invested in real estate.

== Political career ==
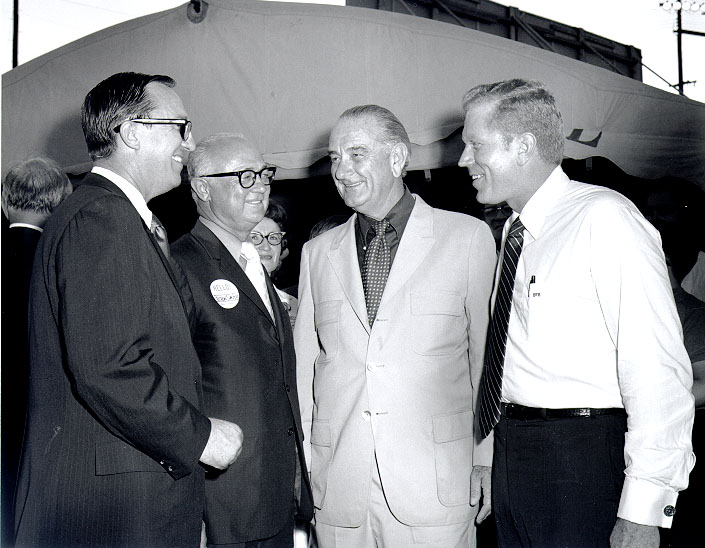
Smith (second from left) with state House Speaker Gus Mutscher, former President Lyndon B. Johnson and Lieutenant Governor Ben Barnes in Brenham, August 1970.

Smith was first elected to the Texas House of Representatives in 1944 and then to the Texas State Senate in 1956.

Smith's inauguration on January 21, 1969, had what was called "the flavor of the South Plains". The Texas Tech University marching band led the parade just behind the marshal and the color guard. A mounted masked Red Raider rode with the band. Governor and Mrs. Smith, both Tech graduates, followed in an open convertible. Other Smith family members rode in the parade, followed by the new lieutenant governor, Ben Barnes. The band of Lamesa High School, Smith's alma mater, was the first among the high school groups. Before the oath taking, the first to be televised in Texas history, Smith had been feted with a $25-per-place victory dinner in the Austin Municipal Auditorium, now the Long Center for the Performing Arts.

Governor Smith played a vital role in establishing both the medical school and the law school at Texas Tech University. He was also known for expanding teacher pay programs as well as early childhood funding which laid the groundwork for state-supported daycare and developmental programming. His administration also proposed the ambitious Texas State Water Plan of 1969, truly proving his dedication to the future of Texas.

In 1971 and 1972, Smith was embroiled in the Sharpstown scandal stock fraud scheme, which eventually led to his downfall. Smith lost his third-term bid for the governorship of Texas to Dolph Briscoe of Uvalde in the Democratic primary in 1972.

== Later life and attempted political comeback ==
After leaving office, Smith returned to Lubbock, Texas, where he was active in civic and business affairs. Although he attempted a political comeback in the 1978 Texas gubernatorial election, he was defeated in the primary.

In his later life, Smith chaired the Higher Education Coordinating Board. He died in Lubbock, Texas, on October 18, 2003, at the age of 91.

Party political offices
| Preceded by Ben Ramsey | Democratic nominee for Lieutenant Governor of Texas; 1962, 1964, 1966 | Succeeded by Ben Barnes |
| Preceded by John Connally | Democratic nominee for Governor of Texas; 1968, 1970 | Succeeded by Dolph Briscoe |
Texas House of Representatives
| Preceded by Hop Halsey | Member of the Texas House of Representatives from District 119 (Lubbock); 1945–1951 | Succeeded by Waggoner Carr |
Texas Senate
| Preceded by Kilmer B. Corbin | Texas State Senator from District 28 (Lubbock); 1957–1963 | Succeeded by H. J. "Doc" Blanchard |
Political offices
| Preceded by Ben Ramsey | Lieutenant Governor of Texas; January 15, 1963 – January 21, 1969 | Succeeded by Ben Barnes |
| Preceded by John Connally | Governor of Texas; January 21, 1969 – January 16, 1973 | Succeeded by Dolph Briscoe |
