= Winning Team Publishing =

Conservative publishing house

Winning Team Publishing is a conservative publishing house founded in 2021 by Sergio Gor and Donald Trump Jr.

The publisher was founded after Trump failed to secure a memoir deal from the Big Five publishers, in part due to fact-checking concerns. Trump has earned millions in royalties from the project.

The publisher has published various authors, including Jeanine Pirro, Charlie Kirk, Kari Lake, and President Donald Trump. President Trump's three coffee table style books have been successful including his latest book, Save America, debuting on the New York Times bestseller list.

In 2023, Hudson Booksellers refused to carry the publisher's books.

== Publications ==
- Save America (September 2024)
- Letters to Trump (April 2023) - A compilation of letters written to Trump that earned $6.75 million in sales from 2023 to 2024.
- Our Journey Together (2021) - A coffee table book of photographs, most in the public domain, from Trump's presidency
- MTG (2023) - A biography by Marjorie Taylor Greene touting the America First policy. The book was criticized for being printed in Canada.
- Unafraid: Just Getting Started - A biography by Kari Lake.
- Crimes Against America: The Left’s Takedown of Our Republic (2023) - Authored by Jeanine Pirro
- The New MAGA Deal (July 16, 2024) - Authored by Peter Navarro
- Right Wing Revolution (June 14, 2024) - Authored by Charlie Kirk
- Liberal Privilege: Joe Biden and the Democrats' Defense of the Indefensible (September 1, 2020) - Authored by Donald Trump Jr.

== See also ==
- Regnery Publishing
