= Florida Council of 100 =

Florida-based non-profit

- Council logo
- Formation: 1961
- Type: Non-profit
- Legal status: Foundation
- Purpose: improve the quality of life for Floridians
- Headquarters: (United States) Tampa, Florida
- Region served: Florida
- Chairman: Sydney Kitson
- Executive Director: Bob Ward
- Main organ: Board of Directors
- Revenue: $1,971,813 (2019)
- Expenses: $1,937,393 (2019)
- Website: www.fc100.org

The Florida Council of 100 is a private, non-profit, non-partisan organization of Florida business leaders who advise the state's governor. It was founded in 1961 and is headquartered in Tampa, Florida.

== History ==
The association was founded in 1961 at the request of then governor Farris Bryant, who asked for advice on problems confronting the state from a business point of view. The council was the first of its kind in the United States, and its website states that it "works with the Governor, the Chief Justice, the Legislature, as well as with private organizations, to achieve quality of life improvements for the people of Florida."

The full Council meets twice each year and has continued to provide that perspective to each governor over the last 50+ years. However, the relationship between the Council and the Governor changed in 1999 with the inauguration of Jeb Bush. Bush directly requested the support and involvement of the council as soon as the election was over. He used the council to promote controversial ideas to state residents and politicians alike. They also defended Bush for his plan to eliminate job security for state workers.

Charlie Crist was not a typical pro-business Republican governor, so the Council concentrated on educational issues during most of his term. Florida's new governor in 2011, Rick Scott, has a business background similar to Jeb Bush. He met with the council two weeks after winning the election and acknowledged that he is depending on those business leaders to allow him to fulfill his campaign promise of 700,000 new jobs in seven years.

== Membership ==
According to the group's website, membership is by invitation from the existing council members, who select recognized and successful leaders from all types of Florida businesses, not elected public service. Those chosen must demonstrate a commitment to the state and believe in the goals of the council. Additionally, they should exhibit character and have been involved in public policy issues. The Council claims that they are committed to diversity of their membership.

The majority of Council members are Republicans, and a number of them are major political campaign donors. In 1998, membership dues were $3,000 per year, generating half a million dollars that year.

== Objectives ==
As business leaders, the members of the Council feel responsibility and have the determination to improve Florida. The council's 1998 mission statement elaborates: "To be a forum of strategic thinkers and leaders having a major positive effect on Florida public policy which enhances the quality of life and economic well-being of all Floridians."

The council's non-profit filing with the Internal Revenue Service states that their purpose is to "educate the community and promote economic development to provide a better standard of living for all Floridians."

Chairman Al Hoffman was more direct: "We want to be a force in shaping public policy. We want to be influential."

== Projects ==
When the council identifies a subject as critically important to the state, they form a task force to research the issue, define problems and possible solutions in a position paper or report. Outside organizations are frequently utilized as a resource to assist in the process. The council partnered with the Florida Chamber of Commerce in creating the study, Closing the Talent Gap: A Business Perspective in January 2010.

The council's website permits access to at least 26 Reports & Position Papers created since 1996. In 2012 the council, together with NBC News, National Journal and the St. Petersburg Times jointly sponsored a nationally televised debate of the leading Republican presidential candidates prior to the 2012 Republican National Convention in Tampa.

== Concerns ==
The intimate relationship between the council and then Governor Bush raised questions among Bush's critics, who saw potential conflicts. Florida State University Public Administration professor Lance deHaven-Smith commented:

"A group of un-elected officials who in their own right have enormous resources and power have become very influential in government without the larger electorate knowing much about it. There had been a sense that the government had been captured by the largest businesses and some of the businesses were like a shadow government -- it was exercised in back rooms and through financial contributions and indirect dealings."

The "privatization of public policy" goes against Florida's Sunshine Laws, which separated business and government by requiring that government meetings be open to the public and other rules which limit campaign contributions.

Burke Kibler, a Democrat, longtime member and former chairman of the council stated: "It's clear that the current leadership tends to be more activist in the sense of wanting the council to help and benefit the program of the governor because most of them politically are attuned with what Governor Bush wants."

Little was published about the council before the Bush years. Research and interview requests for a 1998 article in Florida Today caused concern among members, who considered it an intrusion. Chairman Hoffman insisted, "We're not a secret organization -- we're a closed organization."

St. Petersburg Times publisher Andy Barnes, a Council member, pointed out that the council doesn't control the process of their recommendations becoming law. He added that most council members run private companies and make decisions without scrutiny. The council is not a philanthropic organization; state policy affects their businesses and they are motivated by self-interest, but they believe that what's good for business is good for the state.

Alex Sink, former president of the Florida division of Bank of America, gave up her Council leadership position because her Democratic husband ran against Bush in 1998. She warned that Republican domination of the council could limit their ability to look at issues from more than one point of view.

Florida Council of 100 Chairpersons
| Member name | Years | Company |
|---|---|---|
| Fred Dickinson Jr. | 1961-63 | Fisher, Dickinson & Prior |
| Raleigh Greene | 1963-64 | First Federal Savings and Loan of St. Petersburg |
| Benjamin Oehlert | 1964-65 | Minute Maid |
| G T Willey | 1965-66 | Martin Company |
| Fred Learey | 1966-69 | General Telephone |
| Scott Linder | 1969-72 | Linder Industrial Machinery Co |
| Robert Thomas | 1972-74 | Exchange Bancorporation |
| J.P. Taravella | 1974-77 | Coral Ridge Properties |
| James Brown | 1977-79 | Southern Bell |
| Marshall Criser | 1979-81 | Gunster, Yoakley, Criser & Stewart |
| H. L. Culbreath | 1981-83 | TECO Energy |
| Fred Drake Jr. | 1983-84 | Mobile Home Industries |
| Burke Kibler | 1984-86 | Holland & Knight |
| Charles Rice | 1986-88 | Barnett Bank |
| Bill Dover | 1988-90 | Dover, PA |
| Whit Palmer | 1990-92 | MFM Industries |
| Jack Critchfield | 1992-94 | Florida Progress Corporation |
| Dick Nunis | 1994-96 | Walt Disney Attractions |
| Stew Turley | 1996-97 | Eckerd Corporation |
| Pete Carpenter | 1997-99 | CSX Corporation |
| Chuck Cobb | 1999–2001 | Cobb Partners |
| Al Hoffman Jr. | 2001–03 | WCI Communities (acquired by Lennar) |
| Chris T. Sullivan | 2003–05 | Outback Steakhouse |
| Pete Rummell | 2005–07 | St. Joe Company |
| Tom James | 2007–10 | Raymond James Financial |
| Steven Halverson | 2010–15 | The Haskell Company |
| Rhea Law | 2015–2016 | Buchanan Ingersoll & Rooney |
| Patrick J. Geraghty | 2017–2018 | Buchanan Ingersoll & Rooney |
| Sydney Kitson | 2019–2023 | Kitson & Partners |
| Eric Silagy | 2023–? | Florida Power & Light |
