= Jennifer Jacobs =

American journalist

- Born: Iowa, United States
- Education: Iowa State University
- Occupation: Journalist
- Years active: 1993-present
- Employer: CBS

Jennifer Jacobs is an American journalist and a senior White House reporter for CBS News.

== Early life and education ==
Jacobs received a bachelor's of art degree in English Language and Literature from Iowa State University in 1993.

== Career ==
Jacobs started her journalism as a general assignment reporter for The Waterloo-Cedar Falls Courier in 1993 where she covered metro news and city government, before becoming a reporter at The Post-Standard in Syracuse in 1999.

Jacobs became a political reporter for The Des Moines Register in 2004, where she covered the Iowa legislature and state government, until she moved into national politics following the Iowa caucuses when she was appointed chief politics reporter in 2011.

Jacobs became a national political reporter for Bloomberg several months ahead of the 2016 presidential election. She was quickly appointed a White House reporter, and in December 2019 Politico observed that she was "seen within the press corps as having one of the best relationships with Trump and his staff." Jacobs has appeared on PBS, CNN and MSNBC.

Jacobs became the target of ire by the Trump 2020 presidential campaign after Bloomberg News announced it would not conduct reporting on any 2020 Democratic presidential candidates after its owner, Michael Bloomberg, announced he was running for president. In February 2020, Jacobs was escorted out of a Trump campaign press conference in Iowa.

In October 2020, Jacobs broke the story that Hope Hicks, a senior White House official and close confidante of Donald Trump, had been diagnosed with the coronavirus. Shortly thereafter, multiple senior Republicans and Trump administration officials, including Trump himself, said they had been infected too. Noting that the administration had attempted to prevent this information from becoming public, New York magazine stated that without Jacobs' scoop, "the world might still be in the dark" about the White House COVID-19 outbreak.

In August 2024, Bloomberg broke the story of the release of Wall Street Journal reporter Evan Gershkovich and others in a prisoner exchange deal with Russia. Jacobs was accused of breaking that story by breaking an embargo, requested by the White House, meant to prevent any jeopardy to the complicated 24-person swap, which involved multiple countries. In the wake of the story, Jacobs left Bloomberg. It is unclear whether she was fired or left the company of her own volition. The company issued a statement by its chief editor John Micklethwait, reading, in part:

Following a full investigation over the past few days by our Standards editor, we have today taken disciplinary action against a number of those involved, and we will be reviewing our processes to ensure that failures like this don’t happen again.

I have also written personally to apologize to each of the prisoners (and we are in the process of delivering those letters).

I apologized immediately on Thursday to Emma Tucker; given the Wall Street Journal's tireless efforts on their reporter’s behalf, this was clearly their story to lead the way on.

We publish thousands of stories every day, many of which break news. We take accuracy very seriously. But we also have a responsibility to do the right thing. In this case we didn't.

John

On November 18, 2025 during a press conference, she broke the news that Trump referred to Bloomberg reporter Catherine Lucey as “piggy”.
