= Liberal Privilege =

2020 book by Donald Trump Jr

Liberal Privilege: Joe Biden and the Democrats' Defense of the Indefensible
- First edition cover
- Author: Donald Trump Jr.
- Language: English
- Subjects: Conservatism in the United States; American Left; Political correctness Conservatism; Presidency of Donald Trump
- Publisher: Self-published
- Publication date: September 1, 2020
- Publication place: United States
- Media type: Print (hardcover)
- Pages: 318
- ISBN: 9780578726984

Liberal Privilege: Joe Biden and the Democrats' Defense of the Indefensible is a self-published non-fiction book by American businessman and political activist Donald Trump Jr., released on September 1, 2020. This is the author's second book, which follows the release of Triggered.

== Summary ==
The book criticizes the Democratic Party and Joe Biden, who was its candidate for president of the United States in the 2020 election. The book also criticizes the American mainstream media (claiming that they cover up for the Democratic Party), as well as Black Lives Matter protests following the murder of George Floyd.

== Background to publishing ==
Trump Jr. reportedly hired three researchers to collect information about Joe Biden and spent three months writing the book. He explained to The New York Times his reasons for writing the book: "While I had no plans for a book this year, I was stuck indoors like the rest of the nation during the pandemic," he said and "I decided to highlight Biden's half century of being a swamp monster, since the media wouldn't do it".

Trump Jr. declined an offer by Center Street, which published his Triggered, to publish Liberal Privilege as well. The New York Times described Trump Jr.'s choice to self-publish the book: "Because Mr. Trump has his own platform – and the promise of bulk purchases from the R.N.C. – he doesn't need the publicity arm of a major publisher."

The book's title contained a typo at one point, with regard to the possessive form of the plural word Democrats, which has since been corrected.

As of 2020, the Republican National Committee is buying the book in bulk for fundraising purposes.

On October 28, 2020, the RNC paid over $300,000 of donor money to Pursuit Venture LLC, a company owned by Trump Jr., for "donor mementos." It was the most money the RNC had ever paid for this purpose. The hardcover retails for $29.99, which suggests roughly how many copies might have been purchased, and the RNC's intent was to give a copy to people who donated $50–$100.
