= Tony Korioth =

American politician (1933–2004)

Member of the Texas House of Representatives from district 49-F
- In office January 8, 1957 – September 10, 1961
- Preceded by: District created
- Succeeded by: Don Warren Hefton

Personal details
- Born: Thomas Anthony Korioth; March 16, 1933 Sherman, Texas
- Died: May 29, 2004 (aged 71) Austin, Texas
- Party: Democratic

Tony Korioth (March 16, 1933 – May 29, 2004) was an American politician who served in the Texas House of Representatives from district 49-F from 1957 to 1961.

He died on May 29, 2004, in Austin, Texas at age 71.
