= Major questions doctrine =

Principle of interpretation in United States law

The major questions doctrine is a principle of statutory interpretation in United States administrative law under which, pursuant to recent Supreme Court precedent, courts have held that questions of major political or economic significance may not be delegated by Congress to executive agencies absent sufficiently clear and explicit authorization. It functions as a canon to limit broad assertions of implied powers, effectively reinforcing the role of legislative power.

The doctrine was articulated as a paradigm in FDA v. Brown & Williamson Tobacco Corp. (2000), which advised "common sense" in assessing whether Congress intended to delegate broad regulatory powers. The phrase "major questions" first appeared in legal scholarship in a 1986 article by Stephen Breyer, and it was first referred to as a "doctrine" in 2008, with the name "major questions doctrine" entering the scholarly mainstream by around 2013. It gained increasing support of conservative legal organizations amid the deregulatory agenda of the first presidency of Donald Trump. Brett Kavanaugh used the term "major rules doctrine" in a 2017 United States courts of appeals dissent, and described it as a know-it-when-you-see-it principle in his Supreme Court confirmation hearing later that year.

It was applied in Utility Air Regulatory Group v. EPA (2014) and King v. Burwell (2015), with Chief Justice John Roberts writing for the majority in the latter. The Court first explicitly called it the "major questions doctrine" in West Virginia v. EPA (2022), where it held that agencies must point to "clear congressional authorization" for the power asserted in "extraordinary cases". (Note: "[I]n certain extraordinary cases, both separation of powers principles and a practical understanding of legislative intent make us 'reluctant to read into ambiguous statutory text' the delegation claimed to be lurking there. Utility Air, 573 U. S., at 324. To convince us otherwise, something more than a merely plausible textual basis for the agency action is necessary. The agency instead must point to 'clear congressional authorization' for the power it claims. Ibid.") The Court characterized the doctrine as an identifiable body of case law addressing agencies repeatedly asserting transformative authority unsupported by legislative mandate. (Note: "It ... refers to an identifiable body of law ... developed over a series of significant cases all addressing a particular and recurring problem: agencies asserting highly consequential power beyond what Congress could reasonably be understood to have granted. Scholars and jurists have recognized the common threads between those decisions. So have we. See Utility Air, 573 U. S., at 324 (citing Brown & Williamson and MCI); King v. Burwell, 576 U. S. 473, 486 (2015) (citing Utility Air, Brown & Williamson, and Gonzales).")

Scholars distinguish between narrow forms of the doctrine, assessing reasonableness of interpretation as a Chevron deference limitation, and broader forms like the clear statement rule. The doctrine has been variously criticized for promotion of "judicial self-aggrandizement" and inconsistency with textualism, originalism, and norms of statutory interpretation. Mila Sohoni wrote that it portends to transform judicial review of agency action.

== As a limitation on Chevron deference ==
The narrower version of the major questions doctrine was as an exception to Chevron deference. Under Chevron v. Natural Resources Defense Council (1984), courts deferred to reasonable agency interpretations of ambiguous provisions:

First, always, is the question whether Congress has directly spoken to the precise question at issue. If the intent of Congress is clear, that is the end of the matter; for the court, as well as the agency, must give effect to the unambiguously expressed intent of Congress. If, however, the court determines Congress has not directly addressed the precise question at issue, the court does not simply impose its own construction on the statute [...] Rather, if the statute is silent or ambiguous with respect to the specific issue, the question for the court is whether the agency's answer is based on a permissible construction of the statute.

Chevron treated Congressional silence or ambiguity in a statute as an implicit delegation of authority to the agency entrusted to implement the statute. During the Roberts Court, the conservative majority became increasingly skeptical of Chevron deference and eventually overruled it in Loper Bright Enterprises v. Raimondo (2024), leaving this aspect of the major questions doctrine superfluous.

Since MCI Telecommunications Corp. v. AT&T Co. (1994), the Supreme Court occasionally declined to give agencies deference in several cases where it did not think Congress would grant sweeping authority in seemingly insignificant provisions. (Note: See below, significant cases, including MCI, FDA, Whitman, and King.)

In 1986, Stephen Breyer, at the time a judge on the First Circuit, endorsed a narrow, flexible version of the major question doctrine in a law review article in 1986, two years after Chevron. Breyer's article also coined the phrase "major questions". After joining the Supreme Court in 1994, Breyer dissented in several major question cases, and was critical of the doctrine's expansion.

== As a clear statement rule ==
The broad version of the major questions doctrine is a clear statement rule, saying that statutes must not be interpreted as delegating power to decide major questions unless the text clearly grants such power.

The Supreme Court moved toward this approach in West Virginia v. EPA (2022), though previous cases also pointed toward a clear-statement approach. In Utility Air Regulatory Group v. Environmental Protection Agency (2014) (UARG), the Court stated that "[w]e expect Congress to speak clearly if it wishes to assign to an agency decisions of vast 'economic and political significance.'" In West Virginia, the majority did not explicitly refer to its test as a "clear statement rule", but did refer multiple times to looking for "clear congressional authorization" (quoting UARG). Court memos from the time that the Supreme Court was considering a stay of the lower court decision in West Virginia, obtained by The New York Times, showed that chief justice John Roberts stated concern that they did not want a case like in Michigan v. EPA (2015), where the Supreme Court ultimately overruled mercury emissions rules from the EPA but did not stay lower orders, allowing the rules to come into effect and forcing companies to spend the funds to become compliant before the decision was made, effectively making the rule irreversible.

In four cases, from Alabama Association of Realtors v. HHS (2021) to West Virginia v. EPA (2022), the Court "adopt[ed] a different and more potent variant of the 'major questions' exception", separate from Chevron deference.

Before joining the Supreme Court, Brett Kavanaugh, then a judge on the D.C. Circuit, endorsed a broad interpretation of the major questions doctrine as a constitutional limitation on agency power in 2017 in a dissent in U.S. Telecom Association v. FCC, saying that "[t]he major rules doctrine helps preserve the separation of powers and operates as a vital check on expansive and aggressive assertions of executive authority."

In Gundy v. United States (2019), a case which did not actually involve the major questions doctrine, Justice Gorsuch noted in dissent (joined by Roberts and Thomas) that "[a]lthough it is nominally a canon of statutory construction, we apply the major questions doctrine in service of the constitutional rule that Congress may not divest itself of its legislative power by transferring that power to an executive agency." Gorsuch reiterated this justification for the doctrine as a clear-statement rule in his concurrence in West Virginia (joined by Alito).

== "Elephants in mouseholes" ==
The major questions doctrine is sometimes referred to as (or distinguished from) the elephants in mouseholes principle (or doctrine, canon, etc.), based upon the aphorism of Justice Scalia's majority opinion in Whitman v. American Trucking Ass'ns, Inc. (2001) that Congress "does not alter the fundamental details of a regulatory scheme in vague terms or ancillary provisions—it does not, one might say, hide elephants in mouseholes."

== Significant cases ==
=== Telecommunications price deregulation ===
In MCI Telecommunications Corp. v. AT&T Co. (1994), Justice Scalia wrote the decision of the Court rejecting an effort by the Federal Communications Commission to deregulate prices charged by common carriers. Even though the Communications Act required common carriers to file "tariffs" setting fixed prices for their service, the FCC relied on a provision allowing it to "modify any requirement" in order to make this requirement optional. The Court held that statutory authorization to "modify" refers only to smaller changes, and does not extend to setting aside entirely such a significant statutory mandate. The dissenting justices would have upheld the FCC's deregulatory interpretation under Chevron.

=== Tobacco and cigarettes ===
In FDA v. Brown & Williamson Tobacco Corp. (2000), Justice O'Connor wrote that the authority of the Food and Drug Administration to regulate "drugs" or "devices" did not extend to regulating cigarettes and tobacco, relying in part on "common sense as to the manner in which Congress is likely to delegate a policy decision of such economic and political magnitude to an administrative agency" (citing MCI v. AT&T). The Court noted that if the FDA's interpretation were correct, then the FDA would have a duty to prohibit cigarettes entirely (because they are unsafe and non-therapeutic devices).

=== Air quality standards ===
In Whitman v. American Trucking Ass'ns, Inc. (2001), a decision holding that Congress unambiguously directed the Environmental Protection Agency to set NAAQS clean air standards without considering costs, (Note: The main statutory provision relied upon was 42 U.S.C. § 7409(b)(2) ("National primary ambient air quality standards, prescribed under subsection (a) shall be ambient air quality standards the attainment and maintenance of which in the judgment of the Administrator, based on such criteria and allowing an adequate margin of safety, are requisite to protect the public health.")) Justice Scalia wrote for the Court that "Congress, we have held, does not alter the fundamental details of a regulatory scheme in vague terms or ancillary provisions—it does not, one might say, hide elephants in mouseholes."

=== Assisted suicide ===
In Gonzales v. Oregon (2006), the Court held that the Attorney General did not have authority under the Controlled Substances Act to prohibit doctors from prescribing regulated drugs for use in physician-assisted suicide where allowed by state law. A.G. Alberto Gonzales had relied on a statutory provision allowing him to revoke a physician's prescription-drug registration when "inconsistent with the public interest". Writing for the majority, Justice Kennedy said that "[t]he importance of the issue of physician-assisted suicide, which has been the subject of an 'earnest and profound debate' across the country, [Washington v. Glucksberg], 521 U. S., at 735, makes the oblique form of the claimed delegation all the more suspect."

=== Small sources of carbon emissions ===
In Utility Air Regulatory Group v. EPA (2014), the Court held that, for purposes of a portion of the Clean Air Act regulating "small sources", the phrase "air pollutants" did not extend to carbon dioxide. Even though the Court had held in Massachusetts v. EPA (2007) that "air pollutants" as used in another section of the statute included carbon dioxide, a majority in UARG v. EPA (Note: This portion of the opinion (II-A) was joined by five justices: Scalia, Roberts, Kennedy, Thomas, and Alito. See 573 U.S. 302, 304 (syllabus). Among these justices, only Kennedy had sided with the majority in Massachusetts v. EPA.) rejected that same interpretation because it would allow EPA to regulate "the operation of millions[] of small sources nationwide" including "large office and residential buildings, hotels, large retail establishments, and similar facilities". Because of that, the Court said that it would first expect Congress to speak clearly before sweeping in such a broad swath of the American economy.

=== Affordable Care Act subsidies ===
In King v. Burwell (2015), a case interpreting the Affordable Care Act, the decision of Chief Justice Roberts declined to apply Chevron deference based on the major questions doctrine. The statute, which gives subsidies to insurance plans bought on exchanges "established by the State", was interpreted by the Department of Health and Human Services to also apply to an exchange established by the federal government. HHS relied in part on Chevron deference to support its interpretation, but the Court said that the agency was not entitled to deference. And even though the Court stated that "the most natural reading of the pertinent statutory phrase" went against HHS, nevertheless the Court agreed that HHS's reading was the correct one based on the larger statutory scheme.

=== COVID-19 eviction moratorium ===
In Alabama Ass'n of Realtors v. Department of Health and Human Services (2021) (per curiam), the Court concluded that the Centers for Disease Control and Prevention (CDC) could not institute a nationwide eviction moratorium under its authority to adopt measures "necessary to prevent the [...] spread of" disease. The decision also noted that "[t]he moratorium intrudes into an area that is the particular domain of state law: the landlord-tenant relationship" and that "'[o]ur precedents require Congress to enact exceedingly clear language if it wishes to significantly alter the balance between federal and state power and the power of the Government over private property'" (quoting United States Forest Service v. Cowpasture River Preservation Ass'n (2020)).

=== COVID-19 vaccine mandate for healthcare workers ===
Biden v. Missouri (2022) (per curiam)

=== COVID-19 vaccine mandate for workplaces ===
National Federation of Independent Business v. Occupational Safety and Health Administration (2022) (per curiam)

=== Greenhouse gases ===
In West Virginia v. EPA (2022), the Supreme Court held, in a decision by Chief Justice Roberts that the phrase "best system of emission reduction [...] adequately demonstrated" (BSER) in section 111 of the Clean Air Act (42 U.S.C. § 7411) did not allow EPA to set emissions standards based on phasing out coal or natural gas, but rather only based on techniques to improve efficiency within each type of energy generation. The Court said that this "generation shifting" approach (rather than a "technology-based approach"), adopted for the first time in the 2015 Clean Power Plan, was an "unheralded power" and "transformative expansion" of the agency's "regulatory authority" found in an "ancillary provision" "that was designed to function as a gap filler and had rarely been used in the preceding decades" in order "to adopt a regulatory program that Congress had conspicuously and repeatedly declined to enact itself" that "essentially adopted a cap-and-trade scheme, or set of state cap-and-trade schemes, for carbon" and would allow "unprecedented power over American industry". Accordingly, the Court concluded that the EPA would have needed "clear congressional authorization" to overcome the Court's skepticism that Congress would have legislated in such a manner.

=== Student loan forgiveness ===
In Biden v. Nebraska (2023), the Court relied in part on the major questions doctrine in its holding that Congress did not authorize the Department of Education to institute a sweeping student loan forgiveness program under the HEROES Act of 2003. Justice Barrett also filed a concurring opinion specifically devoted to analyzing the doctrine and its origins. She argued that it is not a clear statement rule in tension with textualism but rather a contextual and intuitive linguistic canon for determining the plain meaning of a statute.

=== Tariffs ===
During his second term, Donald Trump invoked the International Emergency Economic Powers Act (IEEPA) to levy tariffs on imported goods from numerous countries, claiming they were needed for national security. Multiple lawsuits challenged these tariffs, which decisions from both the United States District Court for the District of Columbia and United States Court of Appeals for the Federal Circuit both ruled that the IEEPA did not give Trump authority to levy tariffs in this manner, with the Federal Circuit Appeals Court further stating the tariffs violated the major questions doctrine. In the consolidated case Learning Resources v. Trump, the Supreme Court ruled against the use of IEEPA to establish tariffs in February 2026 in a 6–3 decision. The majority opinion by Chief Justice Roberts relied on the major questions doctrine in undoing the tariffs, Justice Gorsuch wrote a concurring opinion, though dissenting and other concurring justices disagreed with applying the principle in this case.

== See also ==
- Nondelegation doctrine
