= Massachusetts v. EPA =

Massachusetts v. Environmental Protection Agency
- Supreme Court of the United States

Argued November 29, 2006 Decided April 2, 2007
- Full case name: Massachusetts, et al., Petitioners v. Environmental Protection Agency, et al.
- Docket no.: 05-1120
- Citations: 549 U.S. 497 (more) 127 S. Ct. 1438; 167 L. Ed. 2d 248; 2007 U.S. LEXIS 3785
- Argument: Oral argument

Case history
- Prior: 415 F.3d 50, 367 U.S. App. D.C. 282 (D.C. Cir. 2005); rehearing denied, 433 F.3d 66, 369 U.S. App. D.C. 56 (D.C. Cir. 2005); cert. granted, 549 U.S. 1029 (2006).
- Subsequent: 249 F. App'x 829 (D.C. Cir. 2007)

Holding
- Greenhouse gases are air pollutants, and the States may sue the United States Environmental Protection Agency if it fails to properly regulate these pollutants.

Court membership
- Chief Justice John Roberts Associate Justices John P. Stevens · Antonin Scalia; Anthony Kennedy · David Souter; Clarence Thomas · Ruth Bader Ginsburg; Stephen Breyer · Samuel Alito

Case opinions
- Majority: Stevens, joined by Kennedy, Souter, Ginsburg, Breyer
- Dissent: Roberts, joined by Scalia, Thomas, Alito
- Dissent: Scalia, joined by Roberts, Thomas, Alito

Laws applied
- U.S. Const. art. III; Clean Air Act

Massachusetts v. Environmental Protection Agency, 549 U.S. 497 (2007), was a United States Supreme Court decision in which the court held that greenhouse gases qualify as air pollutants. The case was commenced by Massachusetts, along with eleven other states and several United States cities, bringing suit against the Environmental Protection Agency (EPA) to force the agency to regulate emissions of carbon dioxide and other greenhouse gases (GHGs) that pollute the environment and contribute to climate change.

Massachusetts argued that, under the Clean Air Act, the EPA was required by law to regulate "any air pollutant" which could "endanger public health or welfare." The EPA disagreed, claiming that federal law did not authorize the agency to regulate GHG emissions.

The court ruled 5–4 in favor of the plaintiffs, finding that GHGs qualify as air pollutants. This led to the U.S. regulation of greenhouse gases under the Clean Air Act.

== Background ==
In 1997, the United States Senate unanimously passed the Byrd–Hagel Resolution prohibiting the U.S. from joining the Kyoto Protocol because it did not set mandatory reduction targets for heavily polluting "developing" countries such as India and China. In 1999, a group of private organizations filed a rulemaking petition asking the EPA to regulate "greenhouse gas emissions from new motor vehicles under §202 of the Clean Air Act."

There were hopes that the incoming Bush presidential administration would direct the EPA to regulate carbon dioxide emissions. However, a few months into his first term in office, Bush clarified his view that carbon dioxide was not a pollutant under the Clean Air Act. The EPA requested public comment on the rulemaking petition in 2001, and denied the petition in 2003. It stated two reasons for its decision:

1. Congress had not granted the EPA authority under the Clean Air Act to regulate carbon dioxide and other GHGs for climate change purposes; and
2. The EPA had determined that setting GHG emission standards for motor vehicles was not appropriate at that time.

The EPA quoted its assistant administrator Jeff Holmstead as saying that "Congress must provide us with clear legal authority before we can take regulatory action to address a fundamental issue such as climate change", and could not "try to use the Clean Air Act to regulate for climate change purposes because the Act was not designed or intended for that purpose", but that they were already taking a number of actions.

=== Court of Appeals ===
A three-judge panel of the United States Court of Appeals for the District of Columbia Circuit upheld the decision of the EPA on September 13, 2005. It was, however, sharply divided on whether the petitioners had standing, and each judge wrote a separate opinion. Judge David S. Tatel, dissenting, said that the loss of shore land caused by climate change "satisfied each element of Article III standing—injury, causation, and redressability".

=== Parties ===
The petitioners were the states of California, Connecticut, Illinois, Maine, Massachusetts, New Jersey, New Mexico, New York, Oregon, Rhode Island, Vermont, and Washington, the cities of New York, Baltimore, and Washington, D.C., the territory of American Samoa, and the organizations Center for Biological Diversity, Center for Food Safety, Conservation Law Foundation, Environmental Advocates, Environmental Defense, Friends of the Earth, Greenpeace, International Center for Technology Assessment, National Environmental Trust, Natural Resources Defense Council, Sierra Club, Union of Concerned Scientists, and the U.S. Public Interest Research Group. Head of the environmental protection division of the Massachusetts Attorney General's office James Milkey represented the petitioners in oral arguments before the Supreme Court.

The respondents were the Environmental Protection Agency, the organizations Alliance of Automobile Manufacturers, National Automobile Dealers Association, Engine Manufacturers Association, Truck Manufacturers Association, CO_{2} Litigation Group, Utility Air Regulatory Group, and the states of Michigan, Alaska, Idaho, Kansas, Nebraska, North Dakota, Ohio, South Dakota, Texas, and Utah. Principal Deputy Solicitor General Gregory G. Garre represented the respondents in oral arguments before the Supreme Court.

== Supreme Court ==
On June 26, 2006, the Supreme Court granted a writ of certiorari to answer whether the Clean Air Act gave the EPA authority to regulate carbon dioxide and other GHGs and whether the EPA administrator was permitted to decline to issue emission standards for motor vehicles on the basis of policy considerations not enumerated in the Clean Air Act's § 202(a)(1).

The threshold issue of standing, which had divided the D.C. Circuit judges, was also extensively briefed by both parties and amici.

=== Arguments ===
==== Petitioners ====
The petitioners asserted that the EPA administrator's decision not to cap carbon dioxide emissions was an abuse of discretion. They argued that scientific uncertainty was not a valid basis for the EPA administrator to decline to regulate. The question before the Supreme Court was according to them "not whether the causation is true or untrue" but whether it was a valid reason for the administrator to not regulate a pollutant. If they prevailed on this point, then the EPA would not have had the discretion to decline to regulate emissions standards if the statutory definition of the Clean Air Act was held to include carbon dioxide. They chose to frame the case as revolving around administrative law, though the dissenting justices were skeptical.

The petitioners argued that the definition in § 202 of "air pollutant" as "any air pollution agent or combination of such agents, including any physical, chemical, biological, radioactive ... substance or matter which is emitted into or otherwise enters the ambient air" required "a conclusion that EPA had the authority to regulate greenhouse gases and that its reasons for saying it could decline to regulate even if it had the authority to do so flouted the statutory language." The Supreme Court therefore considered whether the reasons given by the EPA were valid reasons for its administrator to decide not to regulate carbon dioxide.

==== Respondents ====
The EPA argued that carbon dioxide was not an "air pollutant" covered by § 202(a)(1). It gave several reasons for this reading of the statute:

1. Congress had never enacted binding emissions limits to "combat global warming".
2. The Supreme Court had decided in FDA v. Brown & Williamson Tobacco Corp. (2000) that "tobacco's unique political history" invalidated the Food and Drug Administration's attempt to assert jurisdiction over an "industry constituting a significant portion of the American economy." The EPA concluded that climate change also had a "political history" and argued that EPA action to regulate air pollutants that contribute to climate change would have a greater economic impact than regulating tobacco.
3. It had concluded that the only reasonable method of reducing emissions was improving fuel economy, which it argued was the responsibility of the Department of Transportation, and that therefore EPA regulation would be conflicting or superfluous.

The EPA also relied on several policy judgments, including potential conflict with the President's "comprehensive approach". One of several other reasons that the EPA administrator gave for declining to regulate carbon dioxide as a matter of discretion was uncertainty about whether man-made carbon dioxide emissions caused global warming.

=== Opinion of the Court ===
Justice John Paul Stevens, joined by Justices Anthony Kennedy, David Souter, Ruth Bader Ginsburg, and Stephen Breyer, wrote the 5–4 majority opinion. First, Stevens found the petitioners to have standing. Quoting Lujan v. Defenders of Wildlife (1992), he said that the procedural right created by 42 U.S.C. § 7607(1) can be asserted "without meeting all the normal standards for redressability and immediacy". He reasoned that the states had a particularly strong interest in the standing analysis and cited Justice Oliver Wendell Holmes Jr.'s opinion in Georgia v. Tennessee Copper Co. (1907):

"This is a suit by a State for an injury to it in its capacity of quasi-sovereign. In that capacity the State has an interest independent of and behind the titles of its citizens, in all the earth and air within its domain. It has the last word as to whether its mountains shall be stripped of their forests and its inhabitants shall breathe pure air."

Steven concluded that Massachusetts was therefore entitled to "special solicitude" in the standing analysis because it had "quasi-sovereign interests" and a "concomitant procedural right".

On the merits, Stevens held that 42 U.S.C. § 7521(a)(1) gave the EPA the authority to regulate tailpipe emissions of GHGs:

"The Administrator shall by regulation prescribe (and from time to time revise) in accordance with the provisions of this section, standards applicable to the emission of any air pollutant from any class or classes of new motor vehicles or new motor vehicle engines, which in his judgment cause, or contribute to, air pollution which may reasonably be anticipated to endanger public health or welfare."

Stevens also stated that "greenhouse gases fit well within the CAA's capacious definition of air pollutant."

On the second merits question, Stevens found the EPA's rationale for not regulating to be inadequate and required it to articulate a reasonable basis for its decision related to whether an air pollutant "cause[d], or contribute[d] to, air pollution which may reasonably be anticipated to endanger public health or welfare". He distinguished Heckler v. Chaney (1985), which held that refusal to initiate an enforcement action was presumptively discretionary by law, from the EPA's refusal to promulgate a rule. The he stated that the EPA's discretion did "not extend to the refusal to execute domestic laws".

Finally, Stevens remanded the case to the EPA, requiring the agency to review its contention that it had discretion in regulating carbon dioxide and other GHG emissions.

=== Dissents ===
==== Roberts ====
Chief Justice John Roberts dissented, joined by Justices Antonin Scalia, Clarence Thomas, and Samuel Alito. First, Roberts criticized the majority's "special solicitude" towards Massachusetts as having no basis in Supreme Court cases dealing with standing. He compared the majority opinion to what he described as "the previous high-water mark of diluted standing requirements," United States v. Students Challenging Regulatory Agency Procedures (1973). He then argued that the record supported an alternate explanation for the loss of land other than rising sea levels caused by climate change. He also claimed that even if there was a possibility that the state could lose some land because of global warming, obliging the EPA to enforce automobile emissions to avoid that possibility was hypothetical at best because there was not a traceable causal connection between its refusal to enforce emission standards and Massachusetts' injuries. Finally, he maintained that redressability of the injuries was even more problematic given that countries such as India and China were responsible for the majority of GHG emissions. He concluded by accusing the majority of using the court as a convenient forum for policy debate and of transgressing the limited role afforded to the court by the Constitution.

==== Scalia ====
Justice Scalia also dissented, joined by Chief Justice Roberts and Justices Clarence Thomas and Alito. Scalia would have found that the court had no jurisdiction to decide the case on the ground that the petitioners lacked standing, which would have ended the inquiry. However, he also continued to the merits because the majority had found standing.

Scalia argued that the main question was "does anything require the Administrator to make a 'judgment' whenever a petition for rulemaking is filed?" He saw the majority's answer to this as an unequivocal yes without authority to back it, stating that the statute said "nothing at all about the reasons for which the Administrator may defer making a judgment", the permissible reasons for deciding not to grapple with the issue at the present time. He therefore saw no basis for the majority's imposed limitation.

In response to the majority's statement that "if the scientific uncertainty is so profound that it precludes EPA from making a reasoned judgment as to whether greenhouse gases contribute to global warming, EPA must say so," Scalia responded that the EPA had done precisely that in the form of the United States National Research Council panel that had researched climate change science.

== Subsequent developments ==
Environmental groups saw the decision as a victory against the Bush administration's unpopular climate change policy. The decision was seen as a stepping stone to the Clean Power Plan and Paris Agreement.

On remand, the EPA found that six GHGs "in the atmosphere may reasonably be anticipated both to endanger public health and to endanger public welfare." On February 16, 2010, Alabama, Texas, Virginia, and several other parties sought judicial review of the EPA's determination in the United States Court of Appeals for the District of Columbia Circuit. On June 26, 2012, a three-judge panel of the court issued an opinion dismissinng the challenges to the EPA's endangerment finding and related GHG regulations. The panel unanimously upheld the EPA's central finding that GHGs such as carbon dioxide endangered public health and were likely responsible for the global warming experienced over the past half century.

A later Supreme Court case in 2022, West Virginia v. EPA, found that the EPA had taken undue authority within the major questions doctrine on regulation of emissions and promoting alternate forms of energy for power plants in the Clean Power Plan. In response, part of 2022's Inflation Reduction Act included language to address the court's decision in West Virginia and codified the findings in Massachusetts in that carbon dioxide among several other GHGs were within the EPA's remit to regulate as pollutants under the Clean Air Act.

== See also ==
- Utility Air Regulatory Group v. Environmental Protection Agency (2014)
- Effects of global warming
- Intergovernmental Panel on Climate Change - Fourth Assessment Report
