= Clear statement rule =

Rule in U.S. law

In American law, the clear statement rule is a guideline for statutory construction, instructing courts to not interpret a statute in a way that will have particular consequences unless the statute makes unmistakably clear its intent to achieve that result. According to law professor William Popkin, such rules "insist that a particular result can be achieved only if the text ... says so in no uncertain terms."

== Protecting constitutional structure ==
Clear statement rules are commonly applied in areas implicating the structural constitution, such as federalism, sovereign immunity, nondelegation, preemption, or federal spending with strings attached. This is especially true when there is a strong interest against implicit abridgment of traditional understandings.

=== Sovereign immunity ===
Congress can abrogate the states' sovereign immunity in some situations. However, it cannot do so implicitly: it must "mak[e] its intention unmistakably clear in the language of the statute." Conversely, just as purported abrogation requires a clear statement, so too a purported waiver by a state requires a clear statement.

=== Major questions and nondelegation ===
The major questions doctrine arises in much the same way as the nondelegation doctrine. The Supreme Court has held in recent years that Congress is expected to be clear when it authorizes agencies to regulate issues of national significance. In a January 2022 decision regarding the authority of the Occupational Safety and Health Administration to require private-sector workers to be vaccinated, the Court reiterated that, “We expect Congress to speak clearly” if Congress wishes to empower executive branch agencies to make decisions “of vast economic and political significance.”

The Court arguably applied a similar approach in the 2006 case of Hamdan v. Rumsfeld. According to Professor John Yoo, the Court in that case attempted "to force a clear statement rule upon congressional delegations of authority to the President." Law Professor Michael W. McConnell has written that a clear statement rule should have been used in the case of Bolling v. Sharpe (1954), because "courts should not presume that Congress has delegated the authority to depart from general principles of equal protection of the laws to subordinate agencies without a clear statement to that effect...."

=== Federalism and preemption ===
With respect to preemption, Congress may preempt a field of regulation, "occup[ying] a field [and] leaving no room for any claim under state law," but it doesn't have to. When a law is construed to preempt, the result is a broad and indiscriminate extinguishment of substantive and remedial state law, and sensitive to this problem, the Court has occasionally said, in cases like Wyeth v. Levine (2009), that it will find preemption only if Congress has clearly expressed preemptive intent. The Court has indicated that preemption of state laws concerning the political activities of the states and their subdivisions requires a more stringent application of the clear statement rule. In Bond v. United States (2014), the Supreme Court insisted upon a “clear indication” that Congress meant to intrude upon powers normally reserved to the states under the Tenth Amendment, and so the Court did not address whether a treaty empowered Congress to do so.

=== Federal spending with strings attached ===
When Congress gives money to states pursuant to the Taxing and Spending Clause, it often attaches conditions. The U.S. Supreme Court has said those conditions must include a clear statement of what the recipient states would be required to do.

In the 1987 case of South Dakota v. Dole, the Court reaffirmed congressional authority to attach conditional strings to receipt of federal funds by state or local governments, but said there can be no surprises; Congress must enable the states "to exercise their choice knowingly, cognizant of the consequences of their participation." The clear statement requirement is in addition to the usual rules that the federal spending must be for the general welfare, the conditions that are imposed must be related to the spending in question, and the arrangement must not turn cooperation into coercion.

== Disfavoring retroactivity ==
Another area in which a clear statement rule operates is with regard to legislation potentially addressing the past, instead of being forward-looking as usual. Statutory retroactivity has usually been disfavored and is in many instances forbidden by the Ex Post Facto Clause of the Constitution. Therefore:

Absent a clear statement from Congress that an amendment [to a statute] should apply retroactively, we presume that it applies only prospectively to future conduct, at least to the extent that it affects substantive rights, liabilities, or duties.

As the Supreme Court has explained, "a requirement that Congress first make its intention clear helps ensure that Congress itself has determined that the benefits of retroactivity outweigh the potential for disruption or unfairness." Such rules do, therefore, have some life in the area of substantive rights as well as enforcement of constitutional structure.

== Avoiding extraterritorial effect ==
In Morrison v. National Australia Bank (2010) the Supreme Court established a presumption against extraterritorial effect and so Congress must clearly express it for U.S. laws to have effect outside U.S. boundaries.

== Protecting fundamental principles and the law of nations ==
According to Professor Popkin, Chief Justice John Marshall imposed a clear statement rule: "where fundamental values were at stake, statutes would not be interpreted to impair such values, absent a clear statement in the legislation.” Indeed, Marshall wrote in 1805 that "Where fundamental principles are overthrown, when the general system of the laws is departed from, the legislative intention must be expressed with irresistible clearness to induce a court of justice to suppose a design to effect such objects."

Marshall also required a clear statement rule to protect international law and wrote that “an act of Congress ought never to be construed to violate the law of nations if any other possible construction remains.” The Charming Betsy Doctrine is from Marshall’s opinion in Murray v. The Charming Betsy (1804), and Marshall applied a similar principle even earlier, in Talbot v. Seeman (1801).

== Areas in which no clear statement is required ==
American courts do not apply clear statement rules in all areas, however. In many cases, the court has found "implied" prohibitions and causes of action in statutes, a result that would be precluded (or at least hampered) by clear statement rules. For example, Title IX of the Education Amendments of 1972 prohibits gender discrimination by recipients of federal education funding. Does the bare prohibition also provide an implied cause of action to an individual subject to discrimination? Yes, the U.S. Supreme Court held in Cannon v. University of Chicago, 441 U.S. 677 (1979) that it provides an implied cause of action. Does the statutory prohibition on discrimination also imply a prohibition on and cause of action for,retaliation against someone who complains of such discrimination? Yes, the Court so held in Jackson v. Birmingham Board of Education, 544 U.S. 167 (2005).

Similarly, the Age Discrimination in Employment Act of 1967 (ADEA) prohibits age discrimination. Does that also imply a prohibition on retaliation against someone who complains of such discrimination? Yes, the Supreme Court held in Gomez-Perez v. Potter, 128 S. Ct. 29 (2008) that a clear statement was unnecessary to prohibit retaliation of that kind.
