= Clean Power Plan =

United States energy plan from President Obama

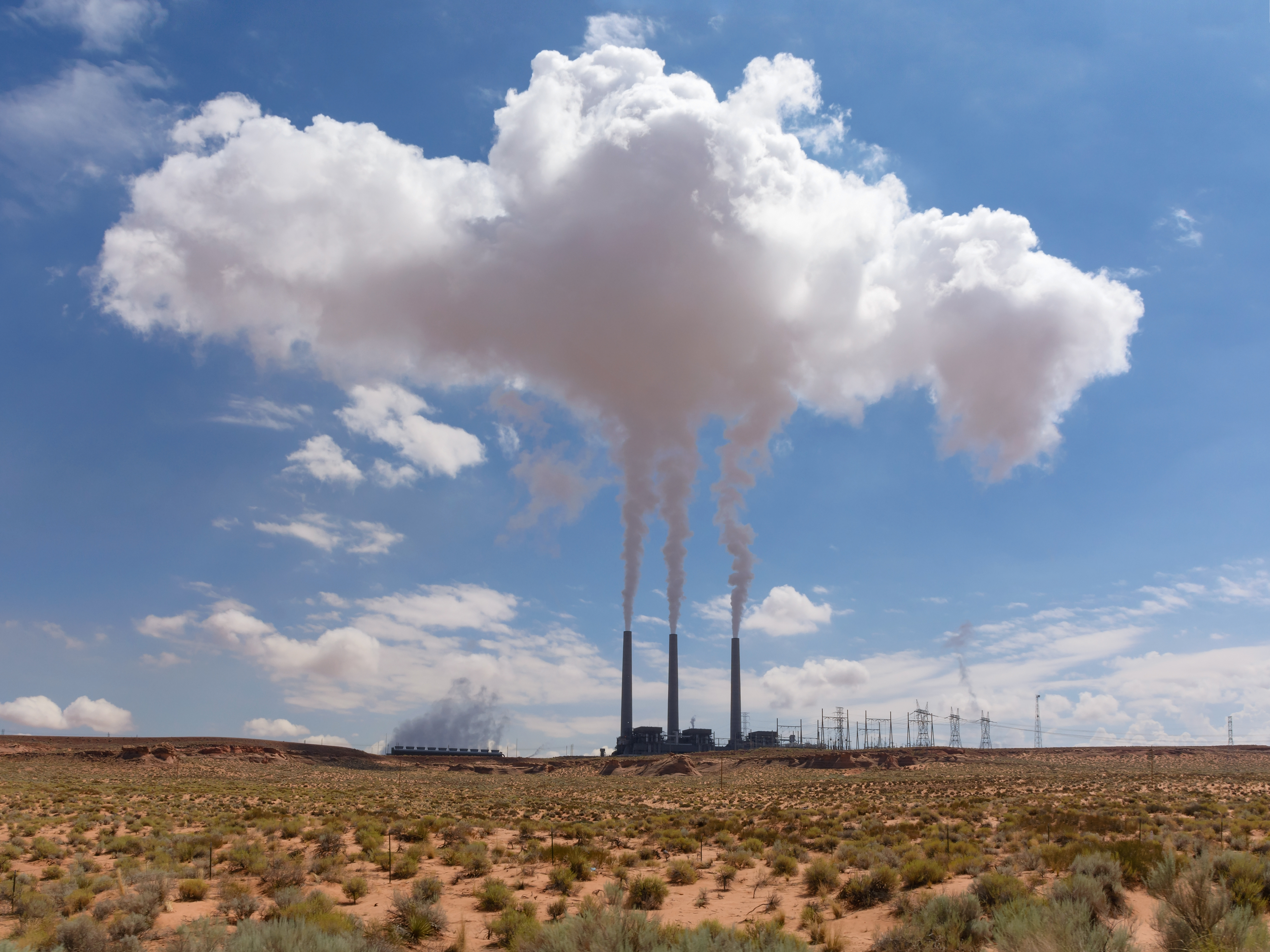
The Navajo Generating Station, a coal-fired power plant outside Page, Arizona

The Clean Power Plan was an Obama administration policy aimed at combating climate change that was first proposed by the Environmental Protection Agency (EPA) in June 2014. The final version of the plan was unveiled by President Barack Obama on August 3, 2015. Each state was assigned a target for reducing carbon emissions within its borders, which could be accomplished how the states saw fit, but with the possibility of the EPA stepping in if a state refused to submit a plan. If every state met its target, the plan was projected to reduce carbon emissions from electricity generation by 32 percent relative to 2005 levels by 2030, and would have reduced other harmful air pollution as well.

In March 2017, President Donald Trump signed an executive order mandating that the EPA review the plan. In June 2017, he withdrew the U.S. from the Paris Climate Agreement, and on October 9, Trump-appointed EPA administrator Scott Pruitt announced the formal process to repeal the Clean Power Plan would begin on October 10, 2017.

In May 2019, EPA Administrator Andrew Wheeler announced plans to change the way the EPA calculates health risks of air pollution, saying the change was intended to rectify inconsistencies in the current cost-benefit analyses used by the agency. This became the Affordable Clean Energy rule. On June 19, 2019, the EPA issued the final Affordable Clean Energy rule (ACE), which replaced the Clean Power Plan. On January 19, 2021, the last full day of the Trump administration, the D.C. Circuit vacated the Affordable Clean Energy rule and remanded to the EPA for further proceedings consistent with its opinion. The court characterized the ACE as a "fundamental misconstruction" of environmental laws. The ruling did not reinstate the Clean Power Plan; however, it did create the opportunity for the Biden administration to improve and clarify the rules.

In 2022, in the case West Virginia v. EPA, the U.S. Supreme Court curbed the EPA's ability to broadly regulate carbon emissions from existing power plants as was done in the Clean Power Plan. The Clean Power Plan was no longer in place, but if it had been, the ruling would have struck it down.

In 2024, the Biden Administration issued a suite of rules called the Greenhouse Gas Standards and Guidelines for Fossil Fuel-Fired Power Plants, sometimes called the "Clean Power Plan 2.0", to replace the Clean Power Plan and ACE.

== Aims ==
The final version of the plan aimed to reduce carbon dioxide emissions from electrical power generation by 32 percent by 2030 relative to 2005 levels. The plan focused on reducing emissions from coal-burning power plants and increasing the use of renewable energy and promoting energy conservation. White House officials also hoped the plan would help persuade other countries that emit large amounts of carbon dioxide to officially pledge to reduce their emissions at the 2015 United Nations Climate Change Conference.

Although the plan did not go into effect, its emissions reduction goal was met 11 years early in 2019 due to increasing energy efficiency, construction of wind and solar power, and changes in energy market prices that resulted in shifting from coal to natural gas.

== Requirements ==
The plan would have required each state to meet specific standards with respect to reduction of carbon dioxide emissions from power plants and to submit emissions reductions plans by September 2016. States could coordinate with other states to develop multi-state plans. The EPA divided the country into three regions based on connected regional electricity grids to determine a state's goal.

States were not told the means they had to use to meet the target, but if a state had not submitted a plan by the deadline, the EPA could have imposed its own plan on that state. States could implement their plans by focusing on three building blocks: increasing the generation efficiency of existing fossil fuel plants, substituting natural gas generation for coal-powered generation, and substituting generation renewable sources for fossil fuel-powered generation.

== Benefits ==
The EPA estimated the Clean Power Plan would have reduced the pollutants that contribute to smog and soot by 25 percent, leading to 140,000 to 150,000 fewer asthma attacks among children and 2,700 to 6,600 fewer premature deaths. Net climate and health benefits were estimated between $25 billion and $45 billion per year beginning in 2030. The average American family would have saved an estimated $85 per year in energy bills in 2030, with a total savings for consumers projected at $155 billion from 2020 to 2030. Enough energy would have been conserved to power 30 million homes and 30 percent more renewable energy would have been generated annually by 2030, with hundreds of thousands of jobs created.

=== Reduced CO_{2} emissions ===
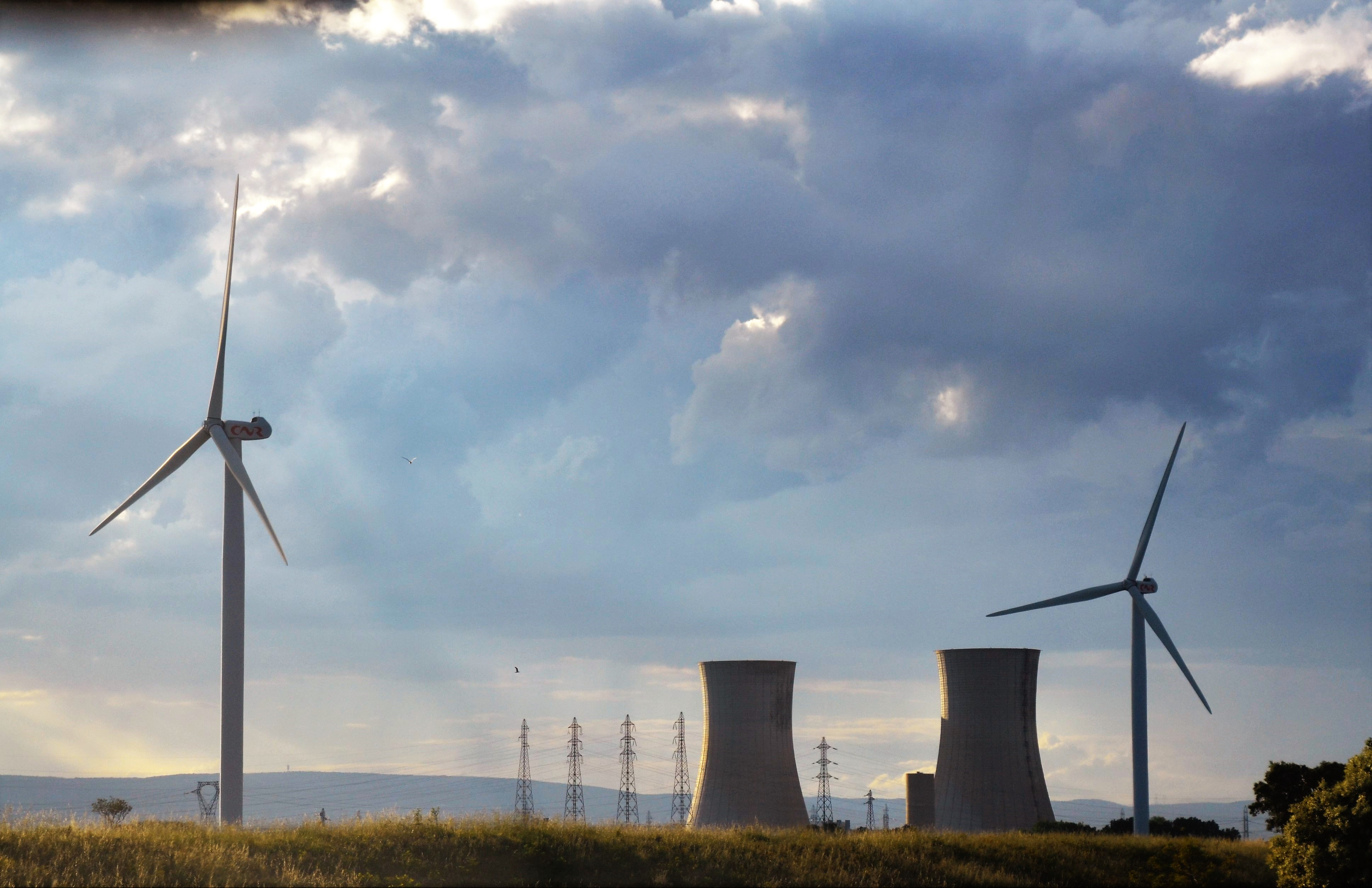
Wind power plant, Jeanne Menjoulet, May 13, 2017

According to the Energy Information Administration (EIA), coal in 2015 in the United States produced 1,364,000,000 metric tons of CO_{2}. This amounted to 71% of CO_{2} emissions from the electric power sector. By switching this coal generation to a cleaner source such as wind power, CO_{2} emissions could be significantly reduced. According to the League of Conservation Voters, in 2015, the Clean Power Plan "established the first national limits on carbon pollution from existing power plants—our nation's single largest source of the pollution fueling climate change" and was "the biggest step" the United States had "ever taken to address climate change."

The Clean Power Plan was one of the first major initiatives in the world to curb internal greenhouse gas emissions. The Paris Agreement was agreed upon in October 2016 and entered into force in November 2016. It aims to keep global temperature rise this century "well below" 2 degrees Celsius and to pursue efforts to limit the temperature increase to 1.5 degrees Celsius. In order to enact the plan, 194 UNFCCC member nations have signed the treaty, 172 of which have ratified it.

The poorest, most underdeveloped nations emit the lowest levels of carbon dioxide and greenhouse gasses. According to the World Bank, greenhouse gas emissions from large nations such as the U.S. and China disproportionately affect developing nations that don't have the infrastructure to combat climate change-induced drought, famine, and other natural and anthropogenic disasters.

=== Economic environmental justice for households ===
The economic impact of the Clean Power Plan (CPP), not including the impact on employment, can be measured by many variables including its impact on electricity prices and health expenditures. In four major studies conducted on the economic impact of the CPP, findings varied widely due to the assumptions made and the variables analyzed. Ultimately, the effect of the CPP on households is most influenced by how states decide to meet their emissions goals, allocate the revenue generated by the carbon tax, and collaborate with other states.

Data on the economic impact of the Clean Power Plan on electricity prices relies heavily on four studies conducted separately by Synapse Energy Economics, M.J. Bradley & Associates, NERA Economic Consulting, and the U.S. Environmental Protection Agency (EPA). Synapse Energy Economics relied on assumptions from a 2012 U.S. Department of Energy (DOE) study on future potential of energy and reported findings indicating that the CPP will decrease the cost of electricity. M.J. Bradley & Associates rely on data from National Renewable Energy Laboratory (NREL) and reported generally optimistic findings, with large decreases in costs due to the CPP. NERA Economic Consulting, funded by coal lobbyists, relied on U.S. Energy Information Administration (EIA) data with pessimistic assumptions, resulting in pessimistic findings stating that some states may even face double-digit price increases. The EPA drew from the NREL for data and made middle-ground assumptions, ultimately reporting findings that are similarly "middle-ground" compared with other studies. The ability to measure and determine the impact on at-risk communities is confounded by these varying conclusions.

Differences between states aside, three key at-risk groups are lower-income communities, higher-income communities, and coal miner communities. Lower-income households may disproportionately experience increases in expenditures due to a large share of their consumption falling into the energy-intensive category, including products and services like electricity, heating, and gasoline. However, lower-income communities are also likely to benefit from increased air quality, and therefore decreased health care expenditures. In order to combat any negative impact of the CPP, states may choose to allocate roughly 10% of their carbon pricing revenue to protect low-income communities. Higher-income communities may be disproportionately affected by the CPP because of decreased income levels, due to greater dependence on capital income, rather than wages. Coal miners, making up 0.057% of the total U.S. employment, may be disproportionately affected by the CPP due to potential layoffs in the coal industry. In contrast, coal miners disproportionately benefit from increased clean air and decreased health expenditures. Just one to five percent of the revenue generated from a moderate carbon price would offset any detriment to coal miner communities.

=== Health impact ===
According to a 2017 analysis of the Energy Innovation's Energy Policy Simulator, a repeal of the Clean Power Plan would lead to an increase in carbon dioxide emissions of more than 500 million metric tons by 2030, and by 2050, that figure would rise to more than 1,200 million metric tons.

Furthermore, the EPA's proximity analysis concludes that a higher percentage of minority and low-income communities live near power plants when compared to the national averages, increasing risk of disease and death due to toxic particulate matter emissions and air pollution.

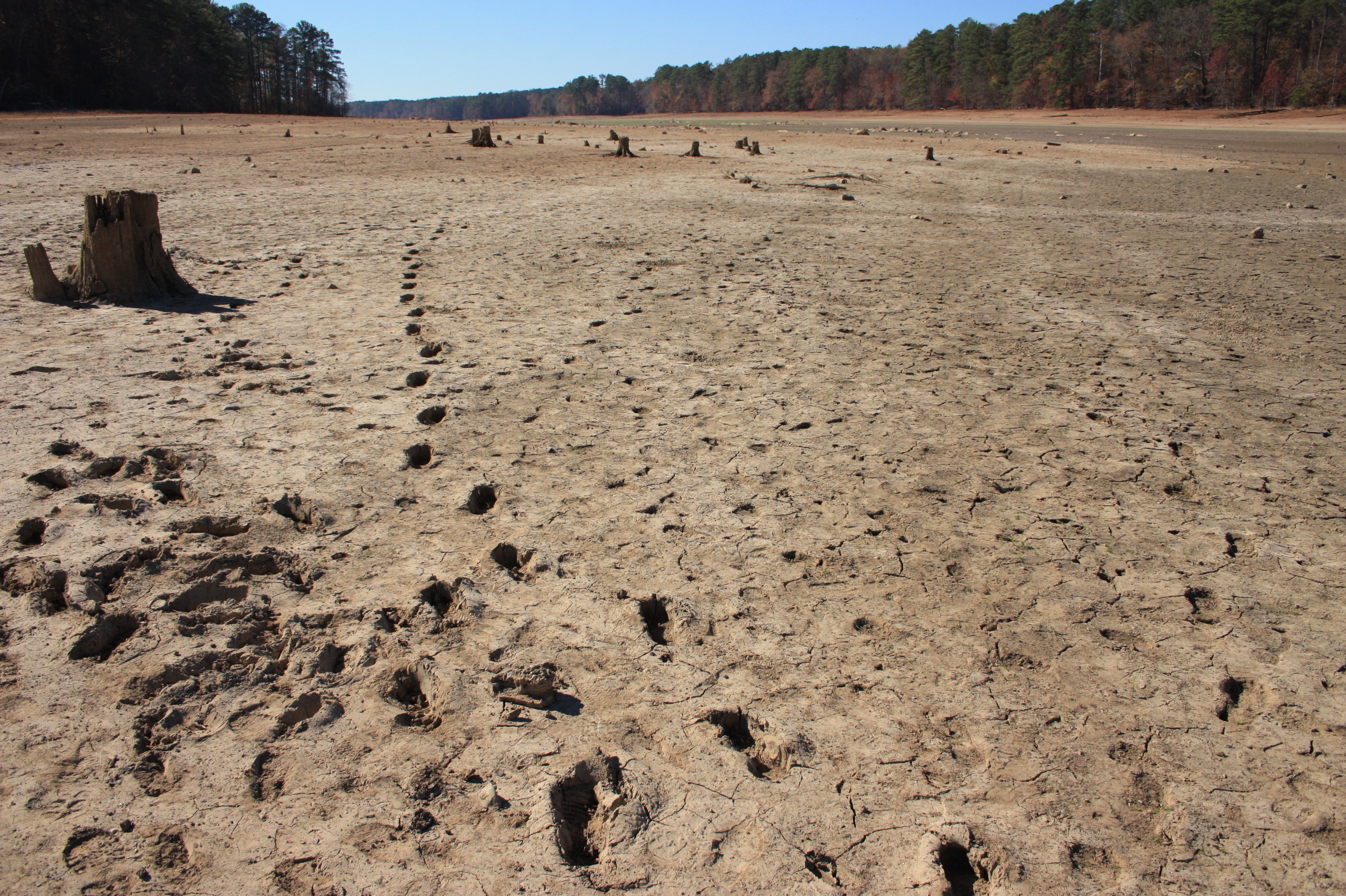
Drought, dried out, middle of forest, Bruce Dupree, October 17, 2016

The EPA has determined that greenhouse gas pollution causes global temperature warming, leading to harmful changes to the environment and human health globally such as increased drought and increased famine due to decrease in water supply and agricultural production. According to the EPA fact sheet on the Clean Power Plan, climate change is responsible for everything from stronger storms to longer droughts and increased insurance premiums, food prices and allergy seasons. The populations most vulnerable to the adverse effects of climate change include children, older adults, people with heart or lung disease and people living in poverty. The repeal of the Clean Power Plan will increase greenhouse gas emissions, expediting the damaging environmental changes due to climate change that disproportionately affect subaltern populations around the globe.

=== Employment and community engagement impact ===
As aforementioned, a major part of the Clean Power Plan's mission is to regulate and reduce greenhouse gas emissions from industry. Opponents of the Clean Power Plan have stated that the attempt in reducing these emissions is also going to be reducing the number of jobs in the United States because of the shrinkage in the industry sector. More specifically, there will be a 19% reduction in the iron and steel production, 21% reduction in cement production, and 11% in refining production. On the other hand, those who argue favorably for the Clean Power Plan have addressed the employment concerns of critics of the Clean Power Plan. While jobs will be decreasing in the industrial sector, there has also been an increase nationwide in the solar sector, wind sector, and energy efficient sector.

While some are skeptical of the Clean Power Plan because of its job loss in the industrial sector, the EPA has made clear that in order for the Clean Energy Plan to be effective community engagement is essential, particularly low income, minority and tribal communities. To ensure opportunities in communities, the EPA is requiring all states demonstrate how they are actively engaging with communities. The EPA has created a Clean Energy Incentive Plan that will reward communities who invest in wind and solar generations; the premise is to increase demand for energy efficient programs in low-income communities. In addition to incentivizing public engagement, they will also be testing air quality evaluations and providing demographic information in order to gauge the impact of air pollution on communities who are located near power plants.

== 2015 announcement ==
President Obama announced the plan in a speech given at the White House on August 3, 2015. In his announcement, Obama stated that the plan includes the first standards on carbon dioxide emissions from power plants ever proposed by the Environmental Protection Agency. He also called the plan "the single most important step that America has ever made in the fight against global climate change."

Obama called his plan "a moral obligation" and made reference to the encyclical Laudato si' by Pope Francis.

The policy has been described as "[Obama's] most ambitious climate policy to date." In response to Obama's 2015 announcement, hundreds of businesses voiced support for the plan, including eBay, Nestlé, and General Mills. To show support for the Clean Power Plan, 360 other companies and investors sent letters to their governors. The companies and investors signing the letter represent all 50 states. In 2016, 2/3 of electric utilities supported the plan.

The 460-page rule (RIN 2060–AR33) titled "Carbon Pollution Emission Guidelines for Existing Stationary Sources: Electric Utility Generating Units" was published in the Federal Register on October 23, 2015.

== Congressional challenge ==
In October 2015, Republican Senator Shelley Moore Capito of West Virginia introduced Senate Joint Resolution 24 (S. J. Res. 24), a “Resolution of Disapproval” under the Congressional Review Act, which would have permanently blocked the Clean Power Plan and prohibited the EPA from developing “substantially similar” standards. S. J. Res. 24 was approved by the Senate on November 17 by a vote of 52–46 and by the House on December 1 by a vote of 242–180. Obama vetoed the resolution on December 18. According to the League of Conservation Voters, the resolution was "an extreme measure...threatening our health and our future." The votes on the resolution were considered key votes by the League and Americans for Prosperity (AFP) Congressional scorecards. AFP said the Clean Power Plan would have a "devastating effect on the economy" and that the resolution would send a "clear signal to the Paris climate negotiators that President Obama's expansive green energy agenda does not have support on Capitol Hill."

== Court challenge ==
In the June 18, 2014, proposed rule, EPA argued that because the 1990 Clean Air Act Amendment is ambiguous, EPA's interpretation is entitled to judicial deference. EPA found the statute to be ambiguous because the language in the United States Code is from a May 23, 1990, House amendment that conflicts with a never codified April 3 Senate conforming amendment.

After the U.S. Supreme Court in King v. Burwell upheld the Affordable Care Act on June 25, 2015, however, the EPA adopted a more aggressive statutory interpretation. In the final rule announced on August 3, the EPA argued that the Senate's language unambiguously allows it to regulate, while the House language in the U.S. Code should be ignored because it is unreasonable under the Clean Air Act's "comprehensive scheme".

Opponents immediately declared the Plan was illegal, attempting to sue before the agency finalized the rule. Only ten days after the EPA announced the final rule, twenty-seven states petitioned the United States Court of Appeals for the District of Columbia Circuit for an emergency stay. Peabody Energy hired Laurence Tribe, President Obama's mentor at Harvard Law School, to author a brief which was later acclaimed on the Senate floor. Tribe would go on to testify before the House Energy and Commerce Committee that the EPA's energy policy was "burning the Constitution."

Challengers argue that EPA overstepped its legal authority in issuing the CPP, in regards to the power plants covered by the plan, and that the scope of the "building blocks" for action goes beyond standards applied to specific electric generating units, as called for by the Clean Air Act. Eighteen states (California, Connecticut, Delaware, Hawaii, Illinois, Iowa, Maine, Maryland, Massachusetts, Minnesota, New Hampshire, New Mexico, New York, Oregon, Rhode Island, Vermont, Virginia and Washington) have joined the litigation in support of the EPA's plan.

=== Enforcement halt by Supreme Court ===
February 2016 shadow docket order in West Virginia v. EPA

On February 9, 2016, the United States Supreme Court stayed the CPP pending litigation. The Court did not offer any reasoning in granting the stay. The Supreme Court's decision to stay the Clean Power Plan has since been understood as the beginning of the Roberts Court's growing use of the emergency docket to issue major rulings. Reporting by The New York Times in 2026 show internal deliberations by the Supreme Court justices in making the decision. It shows that Roberts believed the harms of the environmental regulations to American industry were substantial, thus necessitating the decision to halt the regulations.

As of July 2016, several states – including Republican-held ones such as Wyoming, South Carolina, Virginia, Arizona, Idaho, and New Jersey – are moving forward to meet the Plan's requirements although sometimes indirectly, regardless of open opposition.

=== D.C. Circuit Court hears argument ===
On September 27, 2016, the case against the CPP was heard in the United States Court of Appeals for the District of Columbia Circuit. The chief judge of the court, Merrick B. Garland, recused himself, as he was also President Obama's US Supreme Court nominee.

The argument has sparked debate about both the constitutionality and the political effects of the Clean Power Plan. The New York Times Editorial Board published an editorial arguing that the D.C. Circuit should uphold the plan.

In August 2017, the U.S. Court of Appeals for the District of Columbia Circuit granted the EPA an additional 60 days to review the CPP and submit their position to the court, before continuing the process to settle the case about the legality of the CPP.

== Proposed actions under President Trump ==
President Donald Trump's proposed 2018 United States federal budget defunded the Clean Power Plan. On March 28, 2017, President Trump signed an executive order directing EPA Administrator Scott Pruitt to review the Clean Power Plan. EPA will need to go through the formal rulemaking process to change the existing rule, and in 2007, the U.S. Supreme Court ruled in the case Massachusetts v. Environmental Protection Agency that EPA regulation of carbon dioxide is actually required by the Clean Air Act, which is still in effect. Trump explained this decision calling the Clean Power Plan a "job-killing regulation" which some see as false, saying "the potential for job growth in the clean energy sector dwarfs any potential job growth in the fossil fuel economy".

Opposition argues that with the repeal of the Clean Power Plan, the United States will not be able to meet the greenhouse gas emission standards agreed to under the Paris Agreement, and in turn, will have to withdraw from the agreement. Without it, the United States is projected to fall over 20% short of its pledge. Because the Clean Power Plan was a significant part of how the United States intended to meet the emission targets it set for the Paris Agreement, this action may discourage other countries from upholding their own commitments. Janet McCabe, an Obama Administration EPA department head, stated that the decision completely disregards the impacts of climate and the cost and benefits associated with the started programs. According to her it will lead to several more years of uncertainty and potentially lost opportunity as well as a worsening public image of the United States internationally. However she is hopeful that the decision's impact on the industry's direction toward a cleaner energy system won't be severe as several states already meet the 2022 target carbon dioxide emissions established in the Clean Power Plan.

On June 1, 2017, Donald Trump announced United States withdrawal from the Paris Agreement, but a number of U.S. states formed the United States Climate Alliance to maintain within state borders the objectives of the Clean Power Plan separately from the federal government.

== Attempted replacement with Affordable Clean Energy rule ==
On October 4, 2017, an EPA document obtained by Reuters revealed that the EPA was planning to repeal the Clean Power Plan. A list of potential alternatives to the Clean Power Plan following public discussion were leaked to Bloomberg News on October 6. Likewise, The Washington Post and CNN reported that the EPA would repeal the plan and limit the alternatives to advice for local utilities on October 10. Then-EPA Administrator Scott Pruitt signed a proposed rule to repeal the Clean Power Plan on that day. New York's and Massachusetts’ attorneys general planned to sue the EPA over the repeal. The EPA held a hearing, titled, "Proposal to Repeal the Clean Power Plan", on Nov. 28–29, 2017 in Charleston, West Virginia. The hearing was live-streamed from the West Virginia capitol building, where it was held.

In May 2019, Administrator Andrew Wheeler announced plans to change the way the EPA calculates health risks of air pollution, resulting in the reporting of far fewer health-related deaths and making it easier to roll back the Clean Power Plan. The Trump administration has argued that the Obama administration over-estimated the health risks for various environmental regulations, to the detriment of industry. Administrator Wheeler defended the change as a way to rectify inconsistencies in the current cost-benefit analyses used by the agency. The new plan will be known as the Affordable Clean Energy (ACE) rule. The planned changes were hailed by industry representatives.

Environmentalists are fighting the administration's power plant regulation rollbacks. In April 2020, several environmental groups and twenty-two states filed their first legal briefs in an attempt to fight the administration's attempt to loosen emission standards. Environmentalists are concerned that the new ACE standards are so limited in the pollution controls it requires power producers to install that it could hamstring future administrations from addressing climate-altering pollution.

On January 19, 2021, the federal D.C. Circuit ruled the Affordable Clean Energy rule violated the Clean Air Act, leaving the administration of incoming President Joe Biden to make a rule from scratch.

=== Supreme Court challenge ===
Several states and energy companies petitioned to the Supreme Court on the basis of the D.C. Circuit ruling to challenge fundamental aspects of the power granted by Congress to the EPA to regulate emissions. The Supreme Court granted certiorari to four petitions in October 2021, consolidated under West Virginia v. EPA, heard during the 2021–22 term. On June 30, 2022, in a 6–3 decision, the Supreme Court ruled against the EPA, holding that "Congress did not grant EPA...the authority to devise emissions caps based on the generation shifting approach the Agency took in the Clean Power Plan" and that "Under this body of law, known as the major questions doctrine, given both separation of powers principles and a practical understanding of legislative intent, the agency must point to 'clear congressional authorization' for the authority it claims."

== See also ==
- Carbon bubble
