= West Virginia v. EPA =

West Virginia v. Environmental Protection Agency
- Supreme Court of the United States

Argued February 28, 2022 Decided June 30, 2022
- Full case name: West Virginia, et al. v. Environmental Protection Agency, et al. The North American Coal Corporation v. Environmental Protection Agency, et al. Westmoreland Mining Holdings LLC v. Environmental Protection Agency, et al. North Dakota v. Environmental Protection Agency, et al.
- Docket nos.: 20-1530; 20-1531; 20-1778; 20-1780
- Citations: 597 U.S. 697 (more) 2022 WL 2347278; 2022 U.S. LEXIS 3268; 142 S. Ct. 2587
- Argument: Oral argument
- Decision: Opinion

Holding
- Congress did not grant the Environmental Protection Agency in Section 111(d) of the Clean Air Act the authority to devise emissions caps based on the generation shifting approach the Agency took in the Clean Power Plan.

Court membership
- Chief Justice John Roberts Associate Justices Clarence Thomas · Stephen Breyer; Samuel Alito · Sonia Sotomayor; Elena Kagan · Neil Gorsuch; Brett Kavanaugh · Amy Coney Barrett

Case opinions
- Majority: Roberts, joined by Thomas, Alito, Gorsuch, Kavanaugh, Barrett
- Concurrence: Gorsuch, joined by Alito
- Dissent: Kagan, joined by Breyer, Sotomayor

Laws applied
- Clean Air Act

West Virginia v. Environmental Protection Agency, 597 U.S. 697 (2022), is a landmark decision of the U.S. Supreme Court relating to the Clean Air Act, and the extent to which the Environmental Protection Agency (EPA) can regulate carbon dioxide emissions related to climate change.

The case centers on the Clean Power Plan (CPP) proposed by the EPA in 2015 under the Obama administration. Among the provisions, the CPP had included regulation at existing power plants under Section 7411(d) of Title 42 of the United States Code to implement "within the fence line" emissions reduction technology and "outside the fence line" generation shifting to alternative clean energy sources such as solar and wind power. The generation shifting aspects of the CPP were challenged by several states and coal industry companies, and the CPP was stayed by the courts and never came into enforcement. The Trump administration's EPA put forth a less-aggressive Affordable Clean Power rule in 2019 which was similar and stayed by courts. The stay was challenged by multiple states and coal industry companies, seeking to question the EPA's ability to regulate existing power plants under 7411(d) as proposed in the CPP. The case was not rendered moot when the Biden administration took over in 2021, as the EPA under the Biden administration stated their inclination to include "outside the fence line" controls, making the case still relevant to the authority the EPA had in interpreting their Congressional charter.

In a 6–3 ruling issued on June 30, 2022, the Court ruled that the regulation of existing power plants in Section 7411(d) must be subject to assessment of the financial burden created by the rule, and within that, Congress did not grant the EPA authority to regulate emissions from existing plants based on generation shifting mechanisms without considering the costs to power plants, which would have invalidated the Clean Power Plan. The EPA may still continue to regulate emissions at existing plants through emissions reduction technologies. While the impact of agency rulemaking on costs had been considered in previous cases, this decision was the first time the court explicitly cited the major questions doctrine as part of its rationale. It was also considered the first case that evoked the court's shadow docket, as the court had stayed lower court decisions and blocked the CPP from coming into effect prior to completion of deliberations at the lower courts.

== Background ==
=== Clean Air Act ===
As part of the amended Clean Air Act (CAA), under § 7411(d) (or Section 111 in the proposed bill), Congress granted the Environmental Protection Agency (EPA) authority to identify the "best system of emission reduction" from power generating plants or other large stationary sources, and work with states to complete implementation plans to incorporate those systems. This authority was split between two regulations, one covering emissions controls for new plants, outlined at § 7411(b), and another controlling emissions at existing plants, at § 7411(d). Within the scope of § 7411(d), while the EPA itself cannot set taxes or fines on plants that fail to meet emission standards, it can work with states in their implementation plans to force generating plants to install emissions control technology or to participate in emissions trading programs, or allow states to implement their own taxes on violating plants. Compared to the EPA's use of § 7411(b) in overseeing new plants, the EPA had rarely evoked § 7411(d) in any of its rule-making, and thus § 7411(d) realized less legal scrutiny compared to other parts of the Clean Air Act.

=== Prior EPA litigation ===
One key piece of litigation related to the Clean Air Act was the 2007 Supreme Court case Massachusetts v. EPA, which in a 5–4 decision, had found that the EPA was mandated by Congress to regulate greenhouse gas emissions and can be sued for failing to enact rules to this end under the Clean Air Act. Massachusetts v. EPA was considered one of the most significant cases in environmental litigation, as it allowed for a range of further lawsuits aimed to force emission-producing entities to limit their emissions.

Another relevant piece of litigation was the 2015 Supreme Court case Michigan v. EPA, which in a 5–4 decision held that the EPA must consider costs and that it interpreted the Clean Air Act unreasonably when it determined that it did not need to consider costs when it issued a "finding" that it was "necessary and appropriate" to regulate fossil fuel power plants. Michigan v. EPA was considered a controversial case in environmental litigation as it was criticized for minimizing health impacts and signalling a retreat of the Chevron deference, in which the interpretation of congressional legislation made by executive agencies is given deference in judicial court established in Chevron U.S.A., Inc. v. Natural Resources Defense Council, Inc., in administrative law.

== Procedural history ==
=== Clean Power Plan ===
In June 2014, the United States Environmental Protection Agency (EPA) proposed The Clean Power Plan (CPP) as an Obama administration rule. The rules aimed to tackle climate change by requiring reductions of carbon dioxide emissions from electricity generation by 32% of recorded 2005 levels by 2030, with the implementation to be set by the states, under the authority granted by the Clean Air Act, § 7411(d). States would have been required to submit implementation plans by 2018 with enforcement to start by 2022. States could require existing plants to implement efficiency improvements, emissions controls, or incorporate renewable energy generation; under these rules, existing plants adding these elements could then be subject to a New Source Review by the EPA under § 7411(b), thus assuring older plants then were brought up to standards expected of new power plants. This was part of the United States' commitment towards the Paris Agreement, using amendments introduced in 1990 to the Clean Air Act that identified carbon dioxide as a pollutant. Although the CPP did not go into effect, its goals were met in 2019 due to energy efficiency, construction of wind and solar power, and energy market prices resulting in shifting of generation from coal to gas.

In August 2015, opponents of the CPP, which included 28 states and hundreds of companies, challenged the EPA's authority in its rulemaking of the CPP, filing suit in the United States Court of Appeals for the District of Columbia Circuit (D.C. Circuit) after the rules were published in the Federal Register. Their suit challenged the CPP primarily on three factors. The first related to an oversight during the reconciliation of the Clean Air Act amendment in 1990 which resulted in the House and Senate versions of § 7411(d) to never be reconciled, and both versions were codified into the signed law. The House version had stated that because other parts of the Clean Air Act had covered regulation of carbon dioxide, the EPA could not use § 7411(d) to cover carbon dioxide emissions from existing plants, while the Senate version allowed for § 7411(d) to overlap carbon dioxide emissions coverage. The EPA inferred that they had judicial deference to interpret the law, following the 2015 Supreme Court decision in King v. Burwell, and used the Senate's language to develop the CPP, while opponents believed that the House version was the intended language consistent with other parts of the law.

Internal memos between the justices on whether to grant a stay before the Circuit court had finished hearing the case.

February 2016 Supreme Court order

A second factor raised by opponents of the CPP was that the EPA's rule reached beyond their normal authority by giving states authority to regulate power plants across the board rather than at an individual plant level. Opponents believed that while the EPA or states could have plants take actions like implementing emissions controls as those were within bounds of the plant's control or "within the fenceline", the rules related to efficiency improvements and renewables were considered to be "outside the fenceline". The third factor was related to Tenth Amendment arguments that the EPA was inappropriately delegating federal authority to the states. In January 2016, the D.C. Circuit agreed to hear the case, though they did not grant a temporary injunction to stay enforcement of the CPP. In February 2016, the Supreme Court ordered a stay in the implementation of the CPP. While the order was unsigned, Justices Ruth Bader Ginsburg, Stephen Breyer, Sonia Sotomayor and Elena Kagan stated they would have denied the request. In 2026, The New York Times obtained several memos by the Supreme Court justices from this point, showing that chief justice John Roberts had expressed concern, echoed by Samuel Alito and Anthony Kennedy, that if they did not stay the D.C. Circuit order, companies would have likely had to expend money to comply with the CPP before a likely final decision from the Supreme Court in 2018. This would effectively made the implementation of CPP irreversible as the court had seen previously in failing to stay a decision from the D.C. Circuit in Michigan v. EPA, which the Supreme Court ultimately overturned but not after companies spent money to become compliant. The D.C. Circuit held an en banc hearing in September 2016.

After the 2016 presidential election and the installation of the Trump administration at the start of 2017, the EPA effectively stated its intent to repeal the Clean Power Plan by March 2017 and to replace it with a new rule that was intended to keep its authority "within the fenceline", and asked the D.C. District to put the case in abeyance. In April 2017, the D.C. District court granted the abeyance request and granted continued extensions through the year. In October 2017, the EPA formally issued its initial ruling to repeal the CPP, and continued to request the D.C. Circuit to hold the case in abeyance until the rulemaking was finalized. Proponents of the CPP urged the District court to press ahead with ruling from the September 2016, since any delay would allow the EPA to avoid its duty to uphold the Clean Air Act. While the D.C. Circuit did continue to grant additional periods of abeyance through June 2018, the court stated that month that it would no longer grant any further requests to delay the case, requiring the EPA to issue its final rule repealing the CPP and introducing a replacement rule, or to allow the court to continue its review.

=== Affordable Clean Energy rule ===
With the D.C. Circuit court refusal to grant further abeyance delays, the EPA issued a new proposed set of emissions regulations, the Affordable Clean Energy (ACE) rule, in August 2018. These repealed the CPP, with the EPA arguing these were developed on a misplaced use of statutory interpretation of § 7411(d). The ACE rules were developed based the EPA's responsibility established in Massachusetts v. EPA, but only setting minimal safeguards and requirements for such reductions, targeting only a reduction of between 0.7% and 1.5% of carbon dioxide emissions from 2005 levels by 2030, compared to the 32% set by the CPP. Further, ACE kept the EPA's regulations to only steps "within the fenceline" of a power plant through emissions controls and lacked any allowance towards efficiency improvements or renewable sources. While power plants that implemented emissions controls would still be subject to a New Sources Review, the ACE rule also aimed to weaken the requirements of this review to make it less rigorous and more likely for older plants to pass without having to upgrade their facilities. EPA analysis estimated this rule would increase particulate pollution compared to what was proposed under CPP, potentially leading to 1,500–3,600 more premature deaths per year by 2030 and up to 15,000 more new cases of upper respiratory problems, among other human health impacts. The EPA argued that these initial rules were based on a limited interpretation of § 7411(d), and that other aspects of the Clean Air Act can be used to address other pollutants to reduce these numbers. With the release of the ACE rule and intent to repeal to the CPP, the D.C. Circuit dismissed the case over the CPP as moot, which subsequently ended the stay on the CPP issued by the Supreme Court.

The new rules were seen as a boon to the states and companies that had opposed the CPP, particularly by President Donald Trump who saw it as a means to support the coal industry, but several other states and public health groups criticized the new rules, putting profits of the fossil fuel sector over public health. Opponents also argued that the 32% reduction target in the CPP had already been met by the time the new ACE was introduced, so the ACE represented a reversal of those gains in reducing emissions. After the final rule was published in June 2019, the American Lung Association and the American Public Health Association filed suit in the D.C. Circuit court to challenge the rule in July 2019. The plaintiffs were joined by over 170 other groups, including twenty three states, several cities, and other public health groups over time. The suit argued that through the ACE rule, the EPA was failing to meet its duty to reduce emissions and improve public health under the Clean Air Act, as well as preventing states from using other long-standing measures such as emissions trading as part of their implementation plans. Oral hearings were heard in October 2020.

The D.C. Circuit ruled 2–1 on January 19, 2021, by happenstance the day before the inauguration of Joe Biden as the next U.S. president, in favor of the plaintiffs, vacating the ACE and its repeal of the CPP. The majority opinion ruled that the EPA's ACE rulemaking was made in an arbitrary and capricious manner intended "to slow the process for reduction of emissions", and that its implementation "hinged on a fundamental misconstruction" of the Clean Air Act's § 7411(d). Because the prior case against the CPP had been rendered moot and the stay against the CPP dismissed, this decision effectively brought the CPP into enforcement, if the EPA chose to continue with it, or to develop a new rule as remanded by the D.C. District court. However, by mid-2021, the Biden administration suggested it was likely seeking an alternate plan than the CPP for carbon dioxide emissions.

== Supreme Court ==
Nineteen other states, led by West Virginia, and power companies challenged the D.C. Circuit's ruling, asserting that the decision gives the EPA too much power in regulating emissions. The states that joined West Virginia were Alabama, Alaska, Arkansas, Georgia, Indiana, Kansas, Louisiana, Missouri, Mississippi, Montana, Nebraska, North Dakota, Ohio, Oklahoma, South Carolina, South Dakota, Texas, Utah, and Wyoming. The case was "the product of a coordinated, multiyear strategy by Republican attorneys general and conservative allies."

In October 2021, four separate petitions (including two from coal corporations and one from North Dakota) were filed, asking the Court to review not only the D.C. Circuit's decision but the interpretation of what powers the EPA has been given by Congress through the Clean Air Act to apply to existing plants under § 7411(d). In the case of West Virginia's petition, there was concern that with the interpretation of § 7411(d) made by the D.C. Circuit court, the EPA "can set standards on a regional or even national level, forcing dramatic changes in how and where electricity is produced, as well as transforming any other sector of the economy where stationary sources emit greenhouse gases." In line with the findings from Michigan v. EPA, the petitioning parties expressed concern that under this interpretation of § 7411(d) "will impose costs we can never recoup because E.P.A., the state, and others will be forced to sink even more years and resources into an enterprise that is — at best — legally uncertain. The court should intervene now."

The Biden administration urged the Supreme Court not to intervene, allowing the EPA to issue its new rule "taking into account all relevant considerations, including changes to the electricity sector that have occurred during the last several years", and allow time for it to be reviewed, rather than make judgment on a speculative EPA rule. The Supreme Court agreed to take the four cases on October 29, 2021, consolidating them as West Virginia v. EPA. Due to the Supreme Court granting the case for review, the EPA indicated it would wait until the Court's decision before proceeding with drafting any new rules to replace the CPP or ACE.

On February 28, 2022, oral arguments were heard and the Court considered if aspects of the case fell within its major questions doctrine, which the Supreme Court has used to require the judiciary to defer to Congress rather than executive agencies on matters with what it perceives to be significant impacts and outcomes if it believes Congress did not explicitly grant that power to the agency.

=== Opinion of the Court ===
On June 30, 2022, the Court's 6–3 decision was issued with Chief Justice John Roberts writing the majority opinion joined by the other conservative Justices. Roberts first rejected the EPA's argument that the case was moot since the CPP had been abandoned. Roberts said the case was still live "unless it is 'absolutely clear that the allegedly wrongful behavior could not reasonably be expected to recur.'" Roberts further stated that since President Biden has stated on record his intent to "vigorously defend" the same approach as the CPP, that there was cause to review the CPP's rules.

The Court ruled that the EPA does not have Congressional authority to limit emissions at existing power plants through generation shifting to cleaner sources (beyond the fence line), but still can regulate emissions at plants by emissions reductions technologies as they have done in the past. Finding that the proposed action of the CPP fell under its major questions doctrine, the Court decided that it required more specific Congressional approval to be implemented. Roberts wrote that "certain extraordinary cases, both separation of powers principles and a practical understanding of legislative intent make us 'reluctant to read into ambiguous statutory text' the delegation claimed to be lurking there... To convince us otherwise, something more than a merely plausible textual basis for the agency action is necessary. The agency instead must point to 'clear congressional authorization' for the power it claims."

Justice Neil Gorsuch wrote a concurring opinion that was joined by Justice Samuel Alito. Gorsuch wrote of the importance of the major questions doctrine, stating that it "seeks to protect against 'unintentional, oblique, or otherwise unlikely' intrusions" on the areas of "self-government, equality, fair notice, federalism, and the separation of powers".

Justice Elena Kagan wrote the dissent, joined by Justices Stephen Breyer and Sonia Sotomayor, citing concerns over climate change and the Court's involvement to override the expertise of the EPA. Kagan wrote: "The subject matter of the regulation here makes the Court’s intervention all the more troubling. Whatever else this Court may know about, it does not have a clue about how to address climate change. And let’s say the obvious: The stakes here are high. Yet the Court today prevents congressionally authorized agency action to curb power plants’ carbon dioxide emissions. The Court appoints itself—instead of Congress or the expert agency—the decision-maker on climate policy. I cannot think of many things more frightening. Respectfully, I dissent."

== Impact ==
Some legal experts have stated that a ruling in West Virginia v. EPA which limits the EPA's power could have a significant impact on the agency's future ability to regulate emissions. In November 2021, Robert Percival, the director of the Environmental Law Program at the University of Maryland, said "This is likely to result in one of the most significant environmental rulings the court has ever reached." Further, because the Supreme Court did not wait until the EPA issued new rules, others felt this signaled that the Court was willing to review Congressional authorization and consider if such authorizations violated the nondelegation doctrine of separation of powers, which would further hamper the EPA's capabilities to regulate emissions. In November 2021, some legal analysts also believed that the Supreme Court's involvement is needed to resolve long-standing conflicts in § 7411(d) and other parts of the Clean Air Act.

The resulting decision did not go as far some experts speculated in removing the Chevron deference or strictly limiting the EPA's powers. However the decision did suggest that major rules made by the EPA or other agencies that go beyond direct interpretation of Congressional mandates may be scrutinized under the major questions doctrine. The rule also curbed further attempts to bring more clean energy sources through EPA regulations under the current CAA language.

The ruling also impacted Biden's climate change plan, which relied on cleaner power sources. While it did immediately set back the U.S.'s efforts to reduce greenhouse gases as much as had been planned, the EPA is still able to mandate emission reduction technology on older plants, such as carbon capture and carbon sequestration, and converting coal plants to operate off natural gas, which burns cleaner than coal. These improvements could reduce the carbon dioxide output from plants by 10% to 15%. However, as guided by Michigan v. EPA, costs must be included in the EPA's assessment, which may limit what technologies could be used. States themselves are also free to set emissions regulations, such as existing Global Warming Solutions Acts, though these regulations and laws are expected to become the subject of litigation.

Legal analyst Ian Millhiser questioned how the proposed CPP could have fallen under the Court's major questions doctrine if the regulation would have had no effect, with the energy sector having met the CPP's targets more than a decade early even without it in place.

The West Virginia v. EPA decision and its focus on the major questions doctrine was considered a precursor to Loper Bright Enterprises v. Raimondo, a 2024 Supreme Court decision that overruled Chevron and eliminated the Chevron deference.

The Supreme Court's stay order was also considered by some to be the first major use of the shadow docket. SCOTUSblog said this was not the first time that there were deliberations for decisions on orders related to the emergency docket, but the first time the Supreme Court issued a stay on an agency regulation while the case was still pending at the appellate courts.

== Legislative action ==
In August 2022, the 117th United States Congress passed the Inflation Reduction Act (IRA) following the West Virginia decision. Among other actions, the bill was written towards several of the points raised in the majority decision and possibly overturns it. The law's language addresses the major questions doctrine by explicitly granting EPA new authorities to regulate greenhouse gases. Title VI of the IRA amended the Clean Air Act to explicitly designate carbon dioxide, hydrofluorocarbons, methane, nitrous oxide, perfluorocarbons, and sulfur hexafluoride as air pollutants, codifying Massachusetts and unambiguously providing the EPA congressional authorization to regulate greenhouse gases. Some legal experts believe this would allow the EPA to set "outside the fence" regulations on existing power plants as to promote clean energy. Other analysts say the law does not extend the EPA's authority to alternative sources; Vermont Law School professor Patrick Parenteau said the Act does not include specific language towards generation shifting, leaving it as a potential major questions doctrine concern.
