= Organic statute (United States) =

U.S. administrative law statute

In United States administrative law, an organic statute is a statute enacted by Congress that creates an administrative agency and defines its authorities and responsibilities. Organic statutes may also impose administrative procedures on an agency that differ from the Administrative Procedure Act. Any modifications to an agency's statutory powers beyond those included in the organic statute are added by Congress in subsequent enabling statutes.

== Examples of organic statutes ==
Organic statutes include (non-exhaustive list):

- An Act to Provide for Surveying Coasts of the United States of Feb, 10, 1807, authorizing the president to create the Survey of the Coasts (National Ocean Service)
- Interstate Commerce Act of 1887, creating the Interstate Commerce Commission
- Federal Trade Commission Act of 1914, creating the Federal Trade Commission
- Communications Act of 1934, creating the Federal Communications Commission
- National Security Act of 1946, creating the National Security Council, Central Intelligence Agency, and National Security Resources Board
- National Aeronautics and Space Act of 1958, creating the National Aeronautics and Space Administration
- Federal Aviation Act of 1958, creating the Federal Aviation Administration
- Postal Accountability and Enhancement Act of 2006, creating the Postal Regulatory Commission

Not all administrative agencies have an organic statute, as they may be created by executive rather than congressional action. Forty percent of agencies created since 1946 (including the National Security Agency, Peace Corps, and Bureau of Alcohol, Tobacco, and Firearms) have been formed by executive action rather than an organic statute.

== Challenges to agency interpretations of organic statutes ==
Because agencies require statutory authorization to act, many disputes in United States administrative law hinge on interpretations of an organic statute. For example, the Occupational Safety and Health Administration (OSHA) justified implementation of its COVID-19 vaccine mandate under OSHA's organic statute, the Occupational Safety and Health Act. OSHA issued a regulation interpreting its organic statute to both authorize and compel a vaccine or test order to protect workers from COVID-19 in the workplace. Ordinarily, agency interpretations of statutes they administer are entitled to Chevron deference by reviewing courts. Nonetheless, the Supreme Court of the United States invoked the major questions doctrine to deny agency deference and reject OSHA's interpretation of the Occupational Safety and Health Act in National Federation of Independent Business v. Occupational Safety and Health Administration.

== See also ==
- Authorization bill
- Organic law
- Organic act
