= MCI Telecommunications Corp. v. AT&T Co. =

- Supreme Court of the United States

Argued March 21, 1994 Decided June 17, 1994
- Full case name: MCI Telecommunications Corp. v. American Telephone & Telegraph Co.
- Citations: 512 U.S. 218 (more)

Holding
- The Federal Communications Commission's permissive detariffing policy is not a valid exercise of its §203(b)(2) authority to "modify any requirement." Because virtually every dictionary in use now and at the time the statute was enacted defines "to modify" as meaning to change moderately or in minor fashion, the word "modify" must be seen to have a connotation of increment or limitation.

Court membership
- Chief Justice William Rehnquist Associate Justices Harry Blackmun · John P. Stevens; Sandra Day O'Connor · Antonin Scalia; Anthony Kennedy · David Souter; Clarence Thomas · Ruth Bader Ginsburg

Case opinions
- Majority: Scalia, joined by Rehnquist, Kennedy, Thomas, Ginsburg
- Dissent: Stevens, joined by Blackmun, Souter
- O'Connor took no part in the consideration or decision of the case.

Laws applied
- 47 U.S.C. § 203(a) & (b)(2) (Communications Act of 1934)

MCI Telecommunications Corp. v. AT&T Co., 512 U.S. 218 (1994), was a United States Supreme Court case about whether the Federal Communications Commission could set aside the requirement that each telecommunications common carrier file a tariff establishing fixed terms and prices for its services.

Congress had directed in section 203(a) that common carriers must file tariffs, which the Court said was a central part of the Communications Act of 1934. During an era of deregulation in the 1980s, the FCC decided — based on its judgment that there was robust competition in the market for long-distance calling — to set aside this requirement through its authority under section 203(b)(2) to "modify any requirement."

AT&T filed a complaint against MCI, one of its competitors, after MCI chose not to file a tariff. The case eventually reached the Supreme Court through a petition for certiorari filed by MCI.

The Supreme Court held that statutory authorization to "modify" does not extend to setting aside entirely such a significant statutory mandate.

== See also ==
- Major questions doctrine
