= Authorization bill =

Type of United States legislation

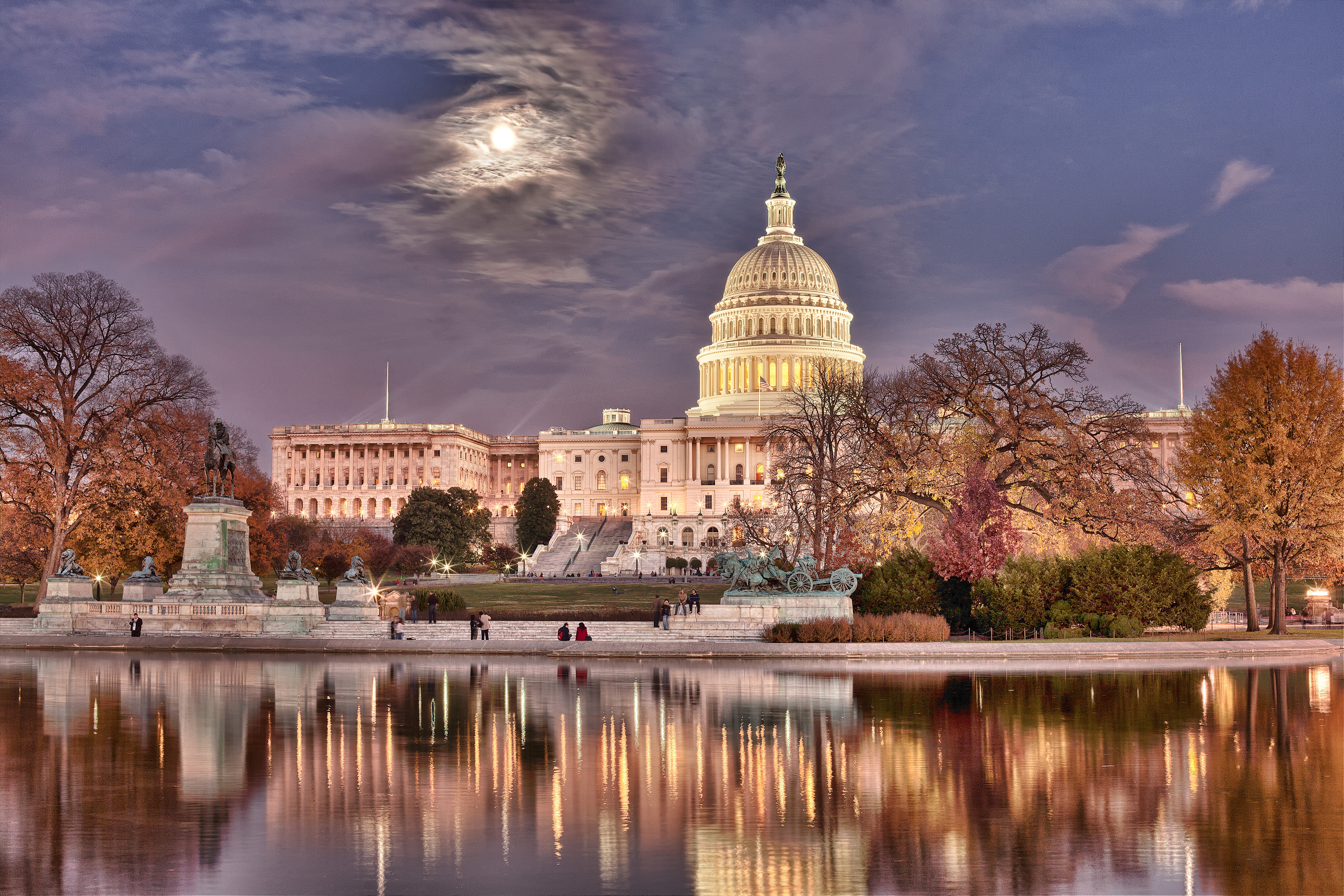
The United States Capitol in Washington, D.C.

An authorization bill is a type of legislation used in the United States to authorize the activities of the various agencies and programs that are part of the federal government of the United States. Authorizing such programs is one of the powers of the United States Congress. Authorizations give those things the legal power to operate and exist. Authorization bills must be passed in both the United States House of Representatives and the United States Senate before being signed by the President of the United States in order to become law. They may originate in either chamber of Congress, unlike revenue raising bills, which must originate in the House. They can also be considered at any time during the year.

== Definition and characteristics ==
According to a reference glossary provided by the United States Senate, an authorization act is "A law that establishes or continues one or more Federal agencies or programs, establishes the terms and conditions under which they operate, authorizes the enactment of appropriations, and specifies how appropriated funds are to be used. Authorizations acts sometimes provide permanent appropriations." Authorization bills create, modify, and/or extend agencies, programs, and/or programs for a limited amount of time (by including an expiration date) or make them perpetual (without expiration date). The bill may get specific about who the leaders of the program will be, what their specific responsibilities are, what reports must be filed with Congress, and so forth. Congress can place recommended funding levels for the agencies and programs they authorize in an authorization bill, but their recommendations are non-binding. The recommendations can be for specific amounts in specific years for specific purposes, or it can be an unlimited amount ("such sums as may be necessary") in a particular time period or indefinitely. It is the appropriations bills that determine how much funding those agencies and programs will get.

Most authorization bills today are for multiple years, with the exception of defense and intelligence agency authorizations, which happen annually. The defense authorization bills are referred to as the National Defense Authorization Act.

== Authorization-appropriation process ==
Authorization bills are part of an authorization-appropriation process created by House and Senate rules governing spending. The spending process has two steps. First, an authorization bill is enacted. Authorization bills "may create or continue an agency, program, or activity as well as authorize the subsequent enactment of appropriations." The second step is for an appropriations bill to be enacted. The appropriations bill provides the funding needed for the agency, program, or activity that was just authorized by the enacted authorization bill. Agencies and programs must have been authorized before they can have funds appropriated to them according to the rules of the House and (to a lesser extent) the Senate. The rules are meant "to ensure that substantive and financial issues are subjected to separate and independent analysis." However, these rules are often not followed.

The two types of bills – authorization bills and appropriations bills – are separated into the jurisdiction of different committees. Appropriations bills are handled by the United States House Committee on Appropriations and the United States Senate Committee on Appropriations and their twelve subcommittees. Authorizing bills fall under the jurisdiction of most of the other standing committees of the House and Senate. Almost all of the standing House committees and Senate committees have authorizing responsibilities. The topics, agencies, or programs that a bill deals with determines to which committee or committees it is referred.

Authorizations bills can recommend funding levels for the agencies and programs they authorize, but their recommendations are non-binding. It is the appropriations bills that determine how much funding those agencies and programs will get.

=== Reauthorizations ===
Some authorization bills are actually reauthorizations of previous programs or agencies that are expiring. For example, in 2013, the 113th United States Congress passed the Violence Against Women Reauthorization Act of 2013 (Pub. L. 113–4 (text) (PDF)), which reauthorized the Violence Against Women Act of 1994.

=== Appropriations directed to expired authorizations ===
The Congressional Budget Office (CBO), under the Congressional Budget Act of 1974 (2 U.S.C. §602(e)(3)), must identify spending appropriations that were linked to expired authorizations, in the following categories:

- Programs and activities funded for the current fiscal year for which the authorizations of appropriations have expired and
- Programs and activities for which the authorizations of appropriations will expire during the current fiscal year

In fiscal year 2024, the spending related to expired authorizations amounted to over $516 billion according to CBO.

The incoming second Trump administration identified some of this $516 billion as waste to be eliminated by the Department of Government Efficiency.

== History ==
The separation between authorization bills and appropriations bills dates back to colonial legislatures and even the British Parliament. At first, this was an informal separation. In the 1830s, however, in reaction to a sharp increase in the number of riders added to appropriations measures, the House and then the Senate added formal rules to separate the two.

Most programs received permanent authorization until the 1950s. This changed in the 1960s and 1970s, when many of these permanent authorizations were converted into temporary ones. This was done because the authorizing committees "wanted greater control of and oversight over executive and presidential activities, especially in view of the interbranch tensions that stemmed from the Vietnam War and the Watergate scandal of the Nixon administration." The second reason for this was to place additional pressure on the appropriations committees to fund the programs at the amounts the authorizing committees had recommended.

== See also ==
- Appropriations bill (United States)
- Organic statute (United States), another term for the act that creates an agency
- United States federal budget
- United States Congress
- List of United States federal legislation
- Powers of the United States Congress
- Procedures of the U.S. Congress
