= Timothy Jost =

Expert on US health law

- Occupation: Professor

Timothy S. Jost is Robert L. Willett Family Professor of Law, emeritus, at Washington and Lee University School of Law. A top expert on American health law and policy, he is a co-author of Health Law (first edition 1987), a casebook that pioneered health law as a teaching and research field in American law schools. His analysis and arguments regarding the Patient Protection and Affordable Care Act (ACA, Obamacare) have been widely quoted.

== Education and career ==
Jost graduated from UC Santa Cruz in 1970, and received his J.D. from the University of Chicago Law School in 1975. He began his legal career at the Legal Assistance Foundation of Chicago, where he used litigation and policy reform to improve health care for residents of Chicago's Uptown neighborhood. From 1981 to 2001 he was a professor at the Ohio State University Moritz College of Law, and from 2001 to 2014 he was Robert L. Willett Family Professor of Law at Washington and Lee. As a two-time Fulbright Scholar, he visited Wolfson College, Oxford in 1988–89 and the University of Göttingen in 1996–97. He is the author or co-author of eleven books and over 150 articles, book chapters, and reviews. He was elected to the National Academy of Medicine in 2011.

== Affordable Care Act ==
When the Affordable Care Act became law in March 2010, it was the most consequential reform of the American health care system in over four decades. It was also an enormously complex piece of legislation, and one that faced immediate legal challenges. Beginning in 2009, Jost began contributing to a blog hosted by Health Affairs, a leading health-policy journal, first following the course of the ACA through the legislative process and then explaining its provisions and associated regulations to academics, journalists, policymakers, lawyers, and other readers. Over eight years, Jost contributed over six hundred posts. Jost has also been widely quoted in the American media, including by NPR, the New York Times, Washington Post, CNN, and other media. Jost also served as an advocate for the ACA in briefs presented to the Supreme Court during the cases King v. Burwell, House v. Burwell, and California v. Texas. In the words of Don Berwick, Administrator of the Centers for Medicare and Medicaid Services under Barack Obama, "Tim Jost is to American health care policy what a GPS is to a dark and unfamiliar road; what Carl Sagan was to astronomy; what Barbara Tuchman was to history. He makes the potentially inaccessible accessible."

== Personal life ==
Jost is a member of Community Mennonite Church, a Mennonite Church USA congregation in Harrisonburg, Virginia. He is married to Ruth Stoltzfus Jost.
