= Government agency =

Organization distinguished by its role in public administration

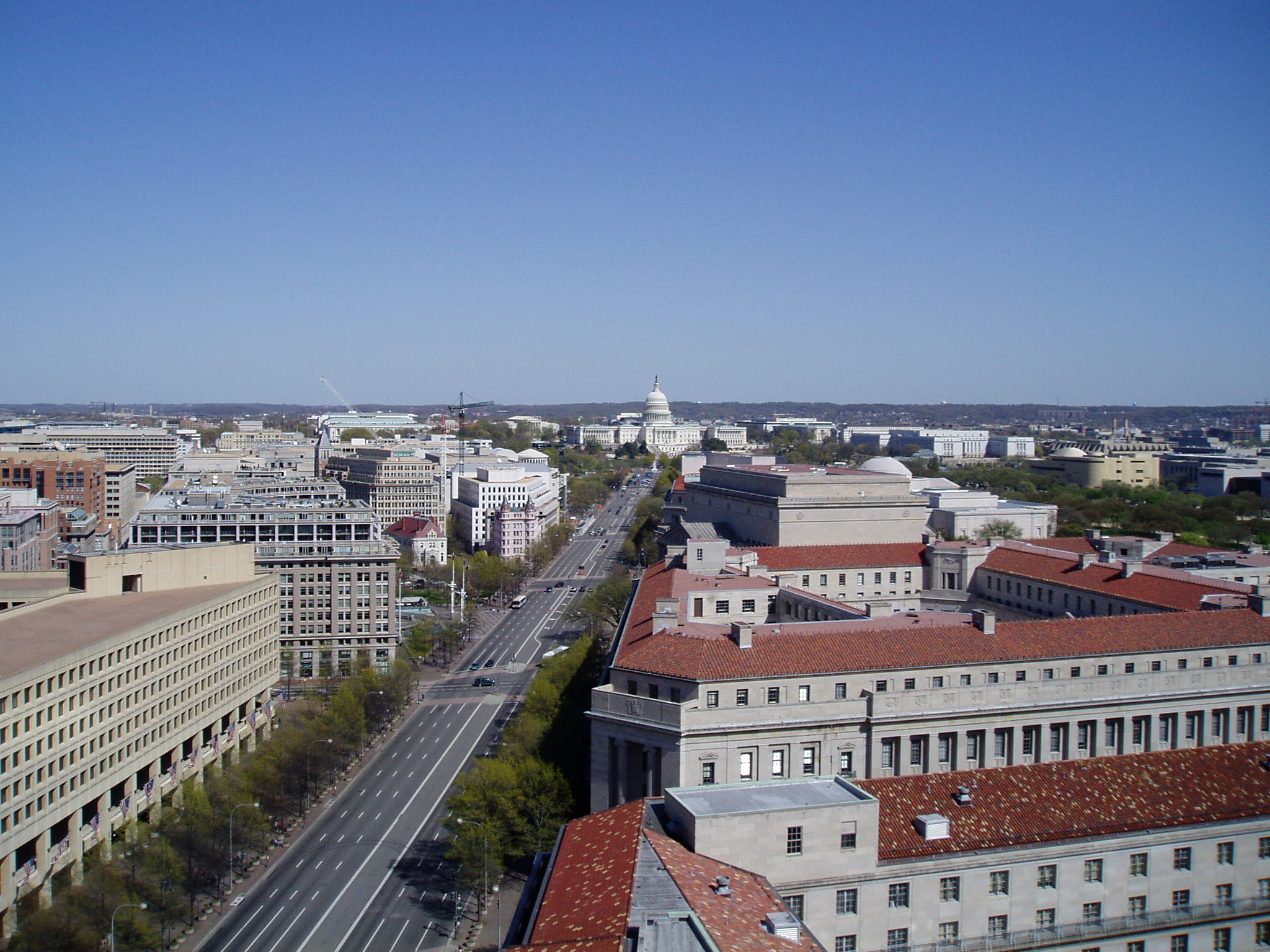
Various headquarters for United States federal government agencies along Pennsylvania Avenue in Washington, D.C., including the Federal Triangle, J. Edgar Hoover Building, and National Archives Building. Also visible is the United States Capitol.

A government agency or state agency, also known as an appointed commission, is a permanent or semi-permanent organization in the machinery of government (bureaucracy) that is responsible for the oversight and administration of specific functions, such as an administration. There is a notable variety of agency types. Although usage differs, a government agency is normally distinct both from a department or ministry, and other types of public body established by government. The functions of an agency are normally executive in character since different types of organizations (such as commissions) are most often constituted in an advisory role — this distinction is often blurred in practice however, it is not allowed.

A government agency may be established by either a national government or a state government within a federal system. Agencies can be established by legislation or by executive powers. The autonomy, independence, and accountability of government agencies also vary widely.

== History ==
Early examples of organizations that would now be termed a government agency include the British Navy Board, responsible for ships and supplies, which was established in 1546 by King Henry VIII and the British Commissioners of Bankruptcy established in 1570.

From 1933, the New Deal saw growth in U.S. federal agencies, the "alphabet agencies", as they were used to deliver new programs created by legislation, such as the Federal Emergency Relief Administration.

From the 1980s, as part of New Public Management, several countries including Australia and the United Kingdom developed the use of agencies to improve efficiency in public services.

== By country ==
=== France ===
Administrative law in France refers to autorité administrative indépendante (AAI) or Independent Administrative Authorities. They tend to be prominent in the following areas of public policy;

- Economic and financial regulation
- Information and communication
- Defence of citizens' rights

Independent Administrative Authorities in France may not be instructed or ordered to take specific actions by the government.

=== Greece ===
The General Secretariat for Macedonia and Thrace (Greek: Γενική Γραμματεία Μακεδονίας-Θράκης), previously Ministry for Macedonia and Thrace (Greek: Υπουργείο Μακεδονίας-Θράκης) is a government agency of the Hellenic Republic that is responsible for the Greek regions of Macedonia and Thrace.

=== India ===
The term agency in India has several meanings; for example, the Cabinet and the parliament Secretariat describes itself as a "nodal agency for coordination amongst the ministries of the Govt. of India". Most notably as an international feature, what appear to be independent agencies (or apex agencies) include some that have active roles for Ministers: such as, the National Security Council, the Medical Council of India, the Pharmacy Council of India (PCI), the Indian Council of Agricultural Research, and the NITI Aayog, which is chaired ex officio by the Prime Minister.

=== Netherlands ===
In the Netherlands, an agency (agentschap) is a part of a government ministry with its own management, budget, and financial administration, separate from the ministry to which it belongs. The minister retains full control of an agency and has full ministerial responsibility for its activities.

=== Russia ===
Russia has had many government agencies throughout its history. The USSR had the secretive KGB. Today, Russian government agencies such as the FSB, FSO, and the GRU use Spetsnaz or other masked operators for any missions. Other organizations include Kremlin and presidential security.

=== Sweden ===
The Government agencies in Sweden are State controlled organizations who act independently to carry out the policies of the Government of Sweden. The Ministries are relatively small and merely policy-making organizations, allowed to control agencies by policy decisions but not by direct orders. This means that while the agencies are subject to decisions made by the Government, Ministers are explicitly prohibited (so-called ban on ministerstyre) from interfering with the day-to-day operation in an agency or the outcome in individual cases as well.

In addition to the State and its agencies, there are also local government agencies, which are extensions of municipalities and county councils.

=== United Kingdom ===
Agencies in the United Kingdom are either executive agencies answerable to government ministers or non-departmental public bodies answerable directly to parliament or the devolved assemblies of the United Kingdom. They are also commonly known as Quangos.

Agencies can be created by enabling legislation by the Parliament of the United Kingdom, Scottish Parliament or the Welsh Parliament.

=== United States ===
The Congress and President of the United States delegate specific authority to government agencies to regulate the complex facets of the modern American federal state. Also, most of the 50 U.S. states have created similar government agencies. Each state government is similar to the national government, with all but one (Nebraska) having a bicameral legislature. The term "government agency" or "administrative agency" usually applies to one of the independent agencies of the United States federal government, which exercise some degree of independence from the President's control. Although the heads of independent agencies are often appointed by the government, they can usually be removed only for cause. The heads of independent agencies work together in groups, such as a commission, board or council. Independent agencies often function as miniature versions of the tripartite federal government with the authority to legislate (through the issuing or promulgation of regulations), to adjudicate disputes, and to enforce agency regulations. Examples of independent agencies include the Federal Communications Commission (FCC), Federal Reserve Board, U.S. Securities and Exchange Commission (SEC), the National Labor Relations Board (NLRB) and the Federal Trade Commission (FTC).

A broader definition of the term "government agency" also means the United States federal executive departments that include the President's cabinet-level departments and their sub-units. Examples of these include the Department of Energy (DOE) and the Internal Revenue Service (IRS), which is a bureau of the Department of the Treasury.

Most federal agencies are created by Congress through "organic statutes," which define the scope of their authority. Because the Constitution does not expressly mention federal agencies, some commentators have called agencies the "headless fourth branch" of the federal government. However, most independent agencies are technically part of the executive branch, while others work within the legislative branch. By enacting the Administrative Procedure Act (APA) in 1946, Congress established means to oversee agency action through uniform administrative law procedures for setting regulations and adjudicating claims. The APA also establishes judicial review of agency action.

== See also ==
- Classification of the Functions of Government
- Government-owned company
- Outline of management
- Political organisation
- Regulatory agency
- Statutory authority
- Statutory corporation
