= FDA v. Brown & Williamson Tobacco Corp. =

- Supreme Court of the United States

Argued December 1, 1999 Decided March 21, 2000
- Full case name: Food and Drug Administration, et al. v. Brown & Williamson Tobacco Corp., et al.
- Citations: 529 U.S. 120 (more) 120 S. Ct. 1291; 146 L. Ed. 2d 121

Holding
- The Food and Drug Administration has no authority to regulate tobacco products.

Court membership
- Chief Justice William Rehnquist Associate Justices John P. Stevens · Sandra Day O'Connor; Antonin Scalia · Anthony Kennedy; David Souter · Clarence Thomas; Ruth Bader Ginsburg · Stephen Breyer

Case opinions
- Majority: O'Connor, joined by Rehnquist, Scalia, Kennedy, Thomas
- Dissent: Breyer, joined by Stevens, Souter, Ginsburg

Laws applied
- Food, Drug, and Cosmetic Act
- Abrogated by
- Family Smoking Prevention and Tobacco Control Act

FDA v. Brown & Williamson Tobacco Corp., 529 U.S. 120 (2000), is an important United States Supreme Court case in U.S. administrative law. It ruled that the Food, Drug, and Cosmetic Act did not give the Food and Drug Administration (FDA) the authority to regulate tobacco products as "drugs" or "devices." This was later superseded by the Family Smoking Prevention and Tobacco Control Act, which granted the FDA the authority to regulate such products.

== Decision ==
The Food and Drug Administration (FDA)'s authority comes from the Federal Food, Drug, and Cosmetic Act of 1938 (FDCA). In the early 1990s, the FDA began arguing that nicotine was a "drug" and cigarettes and smokeless tobacco are "devices" that deliver it to the body. Tobacco companies, including Brown & Williamson and Philip Morris, challenged the regulations, arguing that Congress had enacted several tobacco-specific laws after the FDCA.

Plaintiffs originally filed this case in the United States District Court for the Middle District of North Carolina, which partially granted the plaintiff companies' claim. On appeal, the United States Court of Appeals for the Fourth Circuit reversed, ruling for the tobacco companies. The Supreme Court ultimately affirmed the Circuit Court's ruling for the tobacco companies, ruling that the FDA did not have the power to enact and enforce the regulations in question. The Court concluded that Congress did not intend to give the FDA the power to regulate tobacco, making the regulations invalid.

== Legal principle ==
The scope of authority held by an agency is determined by the agency's organic statute. Where Congress repeatedly denies an agency the power to regulate a particular area and develops a comprehensive regulatory scheme outside the agency's control, the agency may not regulate that area.

Whereas United States v. Southwestern Cable Co. (1968) allowed an agency to regulate outside its statutorily designated areas when necessary to fulfill its overarching goal, this decision forbids agencies from regulating in areas where Congress has developed a separate statutory scheme.

== Further developments ==
This decision was overridden by the passage of the Family Smoking Prevention and Tobacco Control Act of 2009, which gave the FDA the authority to regulate the tobacco industry and control the level of nicotine in cigarettes.

== See also ==
- Major questions doctrine – Principle of interpretation in United States law
- Y1 (tobacco)
