= King v. Burwell =

- Supreme Court of the United States

Argued March 4, 2015 Decided June 25, 2015
- Full case name: David King, et al., Petitioners v. Sylvia Burwell, Secretary of Health and Human Services, et al.
- Docket no.: 14-114
- Citations: 576 U.S. 473 (more) 135 S. Ct. 2480; 192 L. Ed. 2d 483
- Argument: Oral argument
- Opinion announcement: Opinion announcement

Case history
- Prior: Case dismissed, King v. Sebelius, 997 F. Supp. 2d 415 (E.D. Va. 2014).; Affirmed sub. nom., King v. Burwell, 759 F.3d 358 (4th Cir. 2014).; Cert. granted, 574 U.S. 988 (2014).

Questions presented
- Whether the Internal Revenue Service ("IRS") may permissibly promulgate regulations to extend tax-credit subsidies to coverage purchased through Exchanges established by the federal government under section 1321 of the ACA.

Holding
- Section 36B of the ACA provides for subsidies under both federally run and state-run exchanges. The wording "...established by the State" was superfluous when read within "the broader structure of the Act".

Court membership
- Chief Justice John Roberts Associate Justices Antonin Scalia · Anthony Kennedy; Clarence Thomas · Ruth Bader Ginsburg; Stephen Breyer · Samuel Alito; Sonia Sotomayor · Elena Kagan

Case opinions
- Majority: Roberts, joined by Kennedy, Ginsburg, Breyer, Sotomayor, Kagan
- Dissent: Scalia, joined by Thomas, Alito

Laws applied
- Affordable Care Act

King v. Burwell, 576 U.S. 473 (2015), was a 6–3 decision by the Supreme Court of the United States interpreting provisions of the Affordable Care Act (ACA). The Court's decision upheld, as consistent with the statute, the outlay of premium tax credits to qualifying persons in all states, both those with exchanges established directly by a state, and those otherwise established by the Department of Health and Human Services.

The petitioners had argued that the plain language of the statute provided eligibility for tax credits only to those persons in states with state-operated exchanges. The Court found the plaintiffs' interpretation to be "the most natural reading of the pertinent statutory phrase." Nevertheless, the Court found the statute as a whole to be ambiguous, and that "the pertinent statutory phrase" ought to be interpreted in a manner "that is compatible with the rest of the law." The majority opinion stated: "Congress made the guaranteed issue and community rating requirements applicable in every State in the Nation. But those requirements only work when combined with the coverage requirement and tax credits. So it stands to reason that Congress meant for those provisions to apply in every State as well."

== Background ==
King v. Burwell, Halbig v. Burwell, Pruitt v. Burwell, (Note: The "v. Burwell" cases were titled "v. Sebelius" until Kathleen Sebelius was replaced by Sylvia Mathews Burwell as United States Secretary of Health and Human Services on June 9, 2014.) and Indiana v. IRS were federal lawsuits challenging U.S. Treasury regulation, 26 C.F.R. § 1.36B-2(a)(1), issued under the Patient Protection and Affordable Care Act (ACA). The challengers argued that the ACA allows for certain subsidies only on state-established exchanges, and that the regulation as implemented by the Internal Revenue Service (IRS), providing for subsidies on state-run exchanges as well as federal exchanges, exceeded the authority Congress granted to it. The Competitive Enterprise Institute coordinated and funded the King and Halbig lawsuits.

Timothy Jost, a health law professor at the Washington and Lee University School of Law, wrote that if the challenges were successful, approximately 5 million Americans who obtained coverage through federal exchanges could have lost their tax credits and, in all likelihood, their health insurance coverage. According to Jost, the individual and employer mandates might also have "disappear[ed] or [been] severely undermined" in states with federal exchanges. Insurers, however, would still have been required to cover all applicants regardless of pre-existing conditions, which could have destabilized the individual insurance markets in states with federal exchanges and could have led to rapid rises in premiums and the possible collapse of one or more of those markets.

The Urban Institute estimated that a decision in favor of King would have resulted in 8.2 million more uninsured people in 34 states. Government figures released June 2, 2015 (for the period ending March 31, 2015) show that approximately 6.4 million Americans were enrolled in a federal exchange and received a supplement at that time, and thus, presumably would have lost the subsidy had the court found for the plaintiff.

On the benefits side, supporters of the plaintiffs argued that stopping unauthorized government spending was important in its own right, that issuing the subsidies was unlawfully subjecting 57 million Americans to taxes from which they were statutorily exempt, and that removing those subsidies "would lend transparency to the PPACA by revealing to millions of Exchange enrollees the full cost of the law's mandates and regulations." The American Action Forum estimated a ruling for the plaintiffs would result in a pay increase of up to $940 per affected worker, 237,000 new jobs, and nearly 1.3 million workers added to the labor force.

As of 2015, sixteen states and the District of Columbia had set up their own exchanges. (Note: Thirteen states have a state-based exchange and use their own websites for enrollment. Had the court ruled in favor of King, one issue that would have needed to be resolved was whether the subsidies should be struck down in the three states–Nevada, New Mexico, and Oregon–that have a state-based exchanges but used the federal healthcare.gov website for enrollment.) If the subsidies and (in effect) the mandates had been struck down in the other 34 states, many thought that the economic foundation of the ACA would have been undermined, putting the entirety of the legislation at risk. Supporters of the plaintiffs, as well as some politicians, also argued that the effects of striking down the subsidies would have been mitigated by government action (including the possibility of states setting up their own exchanges in response to a ruling in favor of the plaintiffs).

The district court in King, and the district court in Halbig both ruled against the plaintiffs. However, on July 22, 2014, the Fourth Circuit Court of Appeals in King and the D.C. Court of Appeals in Halbig came to opposite conclusions, creating a circuit split. When the D.C. appeals court decided to rehear the case en banc, however, the court vacated its initial ruling, removing the split. On September 9, 2014, in Pruitt v. Burwell, the U.S. District Court for the Eastern District of Oklahoma ruled for the plaintiffs, invalidating the IRS rule. On November 7, 2014, the Supreme Court granted certiorari in the King case. Oral arguments were heard on March 4, 2015, and a decision was handed down on June 25, 2015, with a win for the Obama administration preserving subsidies in states that have not established their own exchange.

== Text of the law and regulation ==
The ACA legislation includes the language "enrolled in through an Exchange established by the State under 1311". As implemented by the IRS, ACA regulations use a more broad definition encompassing both the state exchanges and the federal exchanges set up under section 1321. The legislation includes the phrase "established by the State under 1311" in nine different locations.

Internal Revenue Code section 36B, enacted as part of the ACA, includes the following provision:

In the case of an applicable taxpayer, there shall be allowed as a credit against the tax imposed by this subtitle for any taxable year an amount equal to the premium assistance credit amount of the taxpayer for the taxable year.

(2) (a) the monthly premiums for such month for 1 or more qualified health plans offered in the individual market within a State which cover the taxpayer, the taxpayer's spouse, or any dependent (as defined in section 152) of the taxpayer and which were enrolled in through an Exchange established by the State under 1311 [1] of the Patient Protection and Affordable Care Act, [...]

The IRS regulation reads:

(a) In general. An applicable taxpayer (within the meaning of paragraph (b) of this section) is allowed a premium assistance amount only for any month that one or more members of the applicable taxpayer's family (the applicable taxpayer or the applicable taxpayer's spouse or dependent)—

(1) Is enrolled in one or more qualified health plans through an Exchange [ . . . ]

The IRS defined the term "Exchange" as:

[...] a governmental agency or non-profit entity that meets the applicable standards of this part [part 155 of title 45 of the Code of Federal Regulations] and makes QHPs [qualified health plans] available to qualified individuals and/or qualified employers. Unless otherwise identified, this term includes an Exchange serving the individual market for qualified individuals and a SHOP [Small Business Health Options Program] serving the small group market for qualified employers, regardless of whether the Exchange is established and operated by a State (including a regional Exchange or subsidiary Exchange) or by HHS [the U.S. Department of Health and Human Services].

== Chevron test and the Major Questions Doctrine ==
In Chevron U.S.A., Inc. v. Natural Resources Defense Council, Inc. the Supreme Court ruled that the U.S Congress may delegate regulatory authority to an agency, and that the agency's regulations carry the weight of the law, if the regulations pass the two-part "Chevron test".

(1) First, always, is the question whether Congress has directly spoken to the precise question at issue. If the intent of Congress is clear, that is the end of the matter; for the court as well as the agency must give effect to the unambiguously expressed intent of Congress.

If the Court determines Congress has not directly addressed the precise question at issue, the court does not simply impose its own construction of the statute ... Rather,

(2) [I]f the statute is silent or ambiguous with respect to the specific question, the issue for the court is whether the agency's answer is based on a permissible construction of the statute.

— Chevron U.S.A. v. NRDC, 467 U.S. 837, 842–843 (1984)

The Fourth Circuit's opinion had ruled that the statutory language was ambiguous and applied the Chevron doctrine, meaning that the IRS's regulatory ruling was given deference.

However, in the Supreme Court's majority ruling, this Court remarked that "had Congress wished to assign that question to an agency, it surely would have done so expressly." For the first time, the Court invoked the major questions doctrine in step zero of the Chevron test. This doctrine states that agencies are presumed not to have delegated authority for actions with exceptional economic and political consequence unless the statute is clear. After the court found that the agency lacked the delegated authority, it refused to apply the Chevron test altogether.

== Arguments ==
=== Legislative intent ===
Plaintiffs argue that Congress intentionally restricted payment of subsidies to state exchanges to induce states into setting up exchanges so their citizens could receive subsidies.

The government argues that the law intends for federal exchanges to be treated identically to state exchanges (and therefore qualifying individuals are entitled to subsidies whether or not their state has set up an exchange), or, in the alternative, if the law were ambiguous, that the regulation at issue was a permissible interpretation of the law.

Lyle Denniston wrote that the parties' positions offer differing views on how to interpret legislation:

The challengers take the "literal interpretation" approach, although they also have policy reasons for reading the ACA as they do. The Obama administration takes the "broader purpose" approach, contending that Congress would not have set up the insurance program on a basis that is as limited as the challengers contend.

In a 2009 paper published in The Journal of Law, Medicine & Ethics, Timothy Jost argued that one way to avoid a commandeering issue with the ACA would be "by offering tax subsidies for insurance only in states that complied with federal requirements". Jost later published an op-ed in the Washington Post arguing that allowing subsidies for Federal exchanges is "the only way of reading the statute that makes sense". In an article in Forbes, Jost pointed out that his original law journal article proposed "several alternatives through which Congress could encourage the states to establish exchanges, one of which was to limit the availability of tax credits to states that operate exchanges. The first alternative [proposed] was that Congress ask the states to establish exchanges, but create a federal fallback exchange in the event they failed to do so."

On January 18, 2012, Jonathan Gruber, a Massachusetts Institute of Technology economist who was a consultant on the ACA, said, "What's important to remember politically about this is if you're a state and you don't set up an exchange, that means your citizens don't get their tax credits." On January 10, 2012, Gruber said, "if your governor doesn't set up an exchange, you're losing hundreds of millions of dollars of tax credits to be delivered to your citizens."

Gruber has characterized his earlier statements as "a mistake", and said that he "might have been thinking that if the federal backstop wasn't ready by 2014, and states hadn't set up their own exchange, there was a risk that citizens couldn't get the tax credits right away." Sarah Kliff of Vox cited as evidence of Gruber's comments being mistaken the fact that despite speaking "regularly to dozens of reporters during this period", he "never mentioned this idea to any of them", and that his models always assumed that subsidies would be available on both state and federal exchanges. In a December 2014 Congressional hearing, Gruber characterized his comments as "reflecting uncertainty about the federal exchange". The King plaintiffs, in their briefs filed in December 2014, referred to Gruber's comments as an indication of Congressional intent supporting their position.

Though the challengers in the Supreme Court case have argued that then-US Senator for Nebraska Ben Nelson, who by insisting that states take the lead in establishing the exchanges, meant that Congress had intended that tax credits go only to qualified recipients in states that had established their own insurance exchanges, Nelson has denied this interpretation in an amicus brief filed with the court, January 28, 2015. In a letter to Senator Bob Casey who sought Nelson's view, the former senator wrote, "I always believed that tax credits should be available in all 50 states regardless of who built the exchange, and the final law also reflects that belief as well".

=== Drafting error ===
Others have argued that the issue is due to a drafting error during the legislative process. Yale Law School Professor Abbe Gluck said that the unusual maneuver of having the ACA become law through reconciliation required a preliminary version of the bill to become law without the "usual legislative clean-up process".

Both the Senate Finance Committee and the Health Committee drafted their own versions of the ACA. The Finance Committee bill assumed that if a state refused to participate, HHS would contract with private companies to run "state exchanges". The Health Committee bill provided for federally run fallback exchanges. When the two bills were combined the Finance Committee bill was used as the primary template but the Health Committee bill's language was used when addressing possible holdout states. The Senate passed the bill and Congressional staff expected to clean up the language at the Conference Committee.

When Health Committee Chairman Ted Kennedy died, however, he was replaced with Republican Scott Brown, who had won a special election by promising to filibuster the ACA. Without 60 Democrats, majority leader Harry Reid was deprived of his ability to invoke cloture. House Speaker Nancy Pelosi was then forced to pass the draft Senate version. Later revisions through the reconciliation process were limited to budget related provisions by the Byrd Rule.

=== Legal standing ===
Plaintiffs argued that they had standing because, without the subsidies, they would be exempt from the individual mandate because the cost of the cheapest insurance plan exceeded 8% of their income, but, with the subsidies, the subsidized cost was low enough to require plaintiffs to purchase insurance or pay a penalty.

In February 2015, The Wall Street Journal and Mother Jones investigated the four plaintiffs. Two of the plaintiffs were Vietnam War veterans, who would be eligible for free care. Another plaintiff provided the court with a motel address, which was used to calculate the cost of insurance, as well as the amount of subsidies; a different address might result in different amounts that may cause her not to have standing. The fourth plaintiff stated that she made $10,000 per year as a substitute teacher, an income low enough to be exempt from the individual mandate, although the Competitive Enterprise Institute suggested that she might have additional income from other work. The investigations also suggested that some plaintiffs may lack standing because the cheapest available subsidized insurance was over 8% of their income, making them exempt from the individual mandate.

== King v. Burwell ==
=== Fourth Circuit decision ===
King v. Burwell
- Court: United States Court of Appeals for the Fourth Circuit
- Argued: May 14, 2014
- Decided: July 22, 2014

Court membership
- Judges sitting: Stephanie Thacker; Roger Gregory; Andre M. Davis

Case opinions
- The plaintiffs contend that the IRS's interpretation is contrary to the language of the statute, which, they assert, authorizes tax credits only for individuals who purchase insurance on state-run Exchanges. For reasons explained below, we find that the applicable statutory language is ambiguous and subject to multiple interpretations. Applying deference to the IRS's determination, however, we uphold the rule as a permissible exercise of the agency's discretion.

Keywords
- Internal Revenue Service, Affordable Care Act

The Fourth Circuit court unanimously upheld the regulation, saying that the wording in the statute was ambiguous, and that the IRS wording was a reasonable interpretation of the statute:

The plaintiffs-appellants bring this suit challenging the validity of an Internal Revenue Service ("IRS") final rule implementing the premium tax credit provision of the Patient Protection and Affordable Care Act (the "ACA" or "Act"). The final rule interprets the ACA as authorizing the IRS to grant tax credits to individuals who purchase health insurance on both state-run insurance "Exchanges" and federally facilitated "Exchanges" created and operated by the Department of Health and Human Services ("HHS"). The plaintiffs contend that the IRS's interpretation is contrary to the language of the statute, which, they assert, authorizes tax credits only for individuals who purchase insurance on state-run Exchanges. For reasons explained below, we find that the applicable statutory language is ambiguous and subject to multiple interpretations. Applying deference to the IRS's determination, however, we uphold the rule as a permissible exercise of the agency's discretion. [....] Rejecting all of the plaintiffs' arguments as to why Chevron deference is inappropriate in this case, for the reasons explained above we are satisfied that the IRS Rule is a permissible construction of the statutory language. We must therefore apply Chevron deference and uphold the IRS Rule.

Although the court ruled unanimously for the government, the opinion stated that it "cannot ignore the common-sense appeal of the plaintiffs' argument; a literal reading of the statute undoubtedly accords more closely with [the plaintiffs’] position", and "the [government has] the stronger position, although only slightly".

=== Supreme Court ===
On November 7, 2014, the Supreme Court granted certiorari in the plaintiff's appeal of the 4th Circuit ruling. The decision to grant certiorari was unusual. It was believed that the Supreme Court would not grant certiorari given the lack of a circuit split, instead awaiting further decisions from lower courts before reviewing the issue. University of Michigan Law School Assistant Professor Nicholas Bagley described the decision to grant certiorari as indicating that "four justices apparently think—or at least are inclined to think—that King was wrongly decided".

=== Amicus briefs ===
Alabama, Georgia, Indiana, Nebraska, Oklahoma, South Carolina, and West Virginia joined amicus briefs in support of the challengers. California, Connecticut, Delaware, the District of Columbia, Hawaii, Illinois, Iowa, Kentucky, Maine, Maryland, Massachusetts, Mississippi, New Hampshire, New Mexico, New York, North Carolina, North Dakota, Oregon, Pennsylvania, Rhode Island, Vermont, Virginia, and Washington filed an amicus brief in support of the government; they state in one part that, under the Pennhurst doctrine, in cooperative federalism legislation passed by Congress, if Congress wishes to impose any conditions on the States, then it must give "clear notice" of such conditions; otherwise, the conditions are invalid. They argue that the controlling phrase "an Exchange established by the State" is "buried in two sub-sections", which effectively "'hide[s] elephants in mouseholes'", were it to mean that Congress imposed the condition on the states that they must establish their own exchanges or their residents would not receive federal subsidies; they say that because of this, the phrases "fail the Pennhurst clear-notice test", thereby making the foregoing condition invalid. Numerous individuals and organizations filed amicus briefs in support of both sides.

The American Public Health Association and the deans of 19 schools of public health filed an amicus brief in support of the government. In the brief, the public health officials estimated that eliminating the premium tax credits in states that use the federal exchange would result in 9,800 additional deaths per year. This figure was based on earlier studies of the impact of the Massachusetts health care reform law on death rates in that state. The brief stated that residents of the 34 states that use the Federal exchange tend to be less healthy and have less access to healthcare than residents of the states that created their own exchanges. The brief argues that eliminating the subsidies will increase this disparity.

== Halbig v. Burwell ==
Halbig v. Burwell
- No. 14-5018
- Court: United States Court of Appeals for the District of Columbia Circuit
- Argued: March 25, 2014
- Decided: July 22, 2014

Case history
- Prior actions: Summary judgment for government defendants, 2014 WL 129023 (D.D.C. January 15, 2014)
- Subsequent action: Rehearing en banc ordered (D.C. Cir. September 4, 2014).

Court membership
- Judges sitting: Thomas B. Griffith; A. Raymond Randolph; Harry T. Edwards

Case opinions
- The IRS does not have the statutory power to grant subsidies to Federally-established insurance marketplaces known as exchanges established under the Affordable Care Act, as the enabling legislation defines exchanges as being established by states themselves. Reversed and remanded with instructions to grant summary judgment to the appellants and to vacate the IRS rule, 2–1. Opinion by Judge Griffith, concurrence by Judge Randolph. Judge Edwards dissents.

Keywords
- Internal Revenue Service, Affordable Care Act

=== U.S. Court of Appeals for the D.C. Circuit panel decision ===
On July 22, 2014, the U.S. Court of Appeals for the D.C. Circuit ruled 2–1 in favor of the plaintiffs.

The Court of Appeals stated:

Because we conclude that the ACA [the Affordable Care Act] unambiguously restricts the [Internal Revenue Code] section 36B subsidy to insurance purchased on Exchanges "established by the State", we reverse the district court and vacate the IRS's regulation [26 C.F.R. § 1.36B-2(a)(1)].

As part of the government's briefs, they argued that none of the plaintiffs had standing to file suit. David Klemencic, one of the plaintiffs, residing in West Virginia was found to have standing under the Administrative Procedure Act (APA). Although West Virginia is geographically in the Fourth Circuit, the APA grants the D.C. Circuit shared jurisdiction over any issue involving a federal agency based in Washington, D.C.

=== U.S. Court of Appeals for the D.C. Circuit rehearing en banc ===
On September 4, 2014, the U.S. Court of Appeals for the D.C. Circuit granted the U.S. Secretary of Health's petition for rehearing the case en banc. The order also vacates the previous July 22 judgment.

On November 12, the Court of Appeals put further proceedings in Halbig into abeyance pending the Supreme Court's ruling in King.

== Pruitt v. Burwell and Indiana v. IRS ==
On September 9, 2014, in Pruitt v. Burwell, the U.S. District Court for the Eastern District of Oklahoma ruled against the IRS, saying:

The court holds that the IRS Rule is arbitrary, capricious, an abuse of discretion or otherwise not in accordance with law, pursuant to 5 U.S.C. §706(2)(A), in excess of statutory jurisdiction, authority, or limitations, or short of statutory right, pursuant to 5 U.S.C. §706(2)(C), or otherwise is an invalid implementation of the ACA, and is hereby vacated.

The government appealed the decision to the Tenth Circuit, and in November 2014, the appeal was placed in abeyance pending the Supreme Court's decision in King. Oklahoma requested that the Supreme Court take up the Pruitt case before appellate judgment so that the Pruitt plaintiffs can present their own arguments alongside the King plaintiffs. The government responded that the Supreme Court should not hear the Oklahoma case, stating that the states could proceed as amici curiae in the King case and that granting the Oklahoma case would raise additional jurisdictional concerns not presented in the King case. The Supreme Court denied certiorari before judgment on January 26, 2015.

In Indiana v. IRS the state of Indiana and multiple Indiana school districts are suing the IRS claiming that the employer mandate should not apply to schools or local governments. The IRS argued that the plaintiffs did not have standing to sue, but that argument was rejected and Judge William T. Lawrence in the U.S. District Court for the Southern District of Indiana ruled that the case could proceed. Oral arguments occurred in October 2014 but a ruling has not been issued.

== Opinion of the Court ==
On June 25, 2015, the Supreme Court issued its ruling, written by Chief Justice Roberts, and joined by Justices Kennedy, Breyer, Ginsburg, Sotomayor, and Kagan, rejecting the challenge to the act. The Court noted that previous attempts to reform health care insurance "encouraged people to wait until they got sick to buy insurance" resulting in "an economic 'death spiral': premiums rose, the number of people buying insurance declined, and insurers left the market entirely."

It further noted that in 2006 "Massachusetts discovered a way to make the guaranteed issue and community rating requirements work—by requiring individuals to buy insurance and by providing tax credits to certain individuals to make insurance more affordable" and that "the Affordable Care Act adopts a version of the three key reforms that made the Massachusetts system successful."

The Court found that the Chevron test "does not provide the appropriate framework here" and also rejected the Court of Appeals approach of deferring to the IRS: "The tax credits are one of the Act's key reforms and whether they are available on Federal Exchanges is a question of deep 'economic and political significance'; had Congress wished to assign that question to an agency, it surely would have done so expressly. And it is especially unlikely that Congress would have delegated this decision to the IRS, which has no expertise in crafting health insurance policy of this sort." It concluded that it is "the Court's task to determine the correct reading of Section 36B."

Citing FDA v. Brown & Williamson Tobacco Corp, the Court noted that "when deciding whether the language is plain, the Court must read the words 'in their context and with a view to their place in the overall statutory scheme.'"

When read in context, the phrase "an Exchange established by the State under [42 U. S. C. §18031]" is properly viewed as ambiguous. The phrase may be limited in its reach to State Exchanges. But it could also refer to all Exchanges—both State and Federal—for purposes of the tax credits. If a State chooses not to follow the directive in Section 18031 to establish an Exchange, the Act tells the Secretary of Health and Human Services to establish "such Exchange." §18041. And by using the words "such Exchange," the Act indicates that State and Federal Exchanges should be the same. But State and Federal Exchanges would differ in a fundamental way if tax credits were available only on State Exchanges—one type of Exchange would help make insurance more affordable by providing billions of dollars to the States' citizens; the other type of Exchange would not.

Having found the text ambiguous, the Court, citing United Savings Association of Texas v. Timbers of Inwood Forest Associates (an opinion written by Justice Scalia) looked "to the broader structure of the Act to determine whether one of Section 36B's 'permissible meanings produces a substantive effect that is compatible with the rest of the law.'" It rejected petitioners' interpretation "because it would destabilize the individual insurance market in any State with a Federal Exchange, and likely create the very 'death spirals' that Congress designed the Act to avoid." The Court observed that the petitioners' interpretation would make the ACA "operate quite differently in a State with a Federal Exchange. As they see it, one of the Act's three major reforms—the tax credits—would not apply. And a second major reform—the coverage requirement—would not apply in a meaningful way ... [W]ithout the tax credits, the coverage requirement would apply to fewer individuals. And it would be a lot fewer ... If petitioners are right, therefore, only one of the Act's three major reforms would apply in States with a Federal Exchange." Here, the statutory scheme compels us to reject petitioners' interpretation because it would destabilize the individual insurance market in any State with a Federal Exchange, and likely create the very "death spirals" that Congress designed the Act to avoid.

Unlike the Fourth Circuit, the Court chose not to rely on the IRS interpretation, noting the "deep 'economic and political significance'" of the question and the IRS's lack of expertise in health insurance policy. By choosing instead to resolve the ambiguous language of the statute by looking at the purpose of the statute as a whole rather than by applying the Chevron doctrine, the Court's decision precludes the possibility of the IRS reversing in the future its decision to have subsidies available on the federally run exchange.

=== Dissent ===
In a dissent joined by Justices Thomas and Alito, Justice Scalia wrote: "The Court holds that when the Patient Protection and Affordable Care Act says 'Exchange established by the State it means 'Exchange established by the State or the Federal Government.' That is of course quite absurd, and the Court's 21 pages of explanation make it no less so." He then ridiculed the decision, saying that the Affordable Care Act should be called "SCOTUScare".

Scalia further noted that the rest of the ACA carefully distinguishes between exchanges established by states and those established by the federal government through Health and Human Services. Scalia cited differences between where the document identifies how the different exchanges receive funding, authority, and names. Scalia used this to argue that the context of the law does not allow for the phrase "established by the state" to mean "established by the state and federal government". He reminds the reader that the purpose of looking at the context of phrases is for "understanding the terms of the law, not [to make] an excuse for rewriting them".

Later, Scalia also pointed out that interpreting the phrase "by the State" as "by the state and federal government" not only eliminates all meaning from the first phrase, but causes problems of interpretation elsewhere in the ACA. "The State" is identified distinctly in the ACA with regards to the formula for calculating tax credits, for screening children for tax credit eligibility, for using a "secure electronic interface" for tax credit screening, for other agencies, for directions on operating web sites, and for guidelines around the enrollment of children. Of this, Scalia mentioned that "[i]t is bad enough for a court to cross out 'by the State' once. But seven times?"

The extensive use of the term "by the State" also contrasts against the more extensive use of more general terms. "Clause after clause of the law uses a more general term such as 'Exchange.'" Scalia pointed out that the court should defer to the specific meaning of this term, and that assuming that the "by the State" term is general does not fit appropriate rules of interpretation. Scalia also notes that the ACA knows how to equate unlike terms explicitly, as it declared that "[a] territory that ... establishes ... an Exchange ... shall be treated as a State." The ACA does not have such an equivalency clause for exchanges established by the federal government.

== See also ==
- List of United States Supreme Court cases, volume 576
- National Federation of Independent Business v. Sebelius (2012)
- Sebelius v. Hobby Lobby (2014)
- Federalism in the United States
