= Utility Air Regulatory Group v. EPA =

Utility Air Regulatory Group v. Environmental Protection Agency
- Supreme Court of the United States

Argued February 24, 2014 Decided June 23, 2014
- Full case name: Utility Air Regulatory Group, Petitioner v. Environmental Protection Agency, et al.
- Docket no.: 12-1146
- Citations: 573 U.S. 302 (more) 134 S. Ct. 2427; 189 L. Ed. 2d 372; 82 U.S.L.W. 4535

Holding
- (1) The Clean Air Act neither compels nor permits EPA to adopt an interpretation of the Act requiring a source to obtain a PSD or Title V permit on the sole basis of its potential greenhouse-gas emissions. (2) EPA reasonably interpreted the Act to require sources that would need permits based on their emission of conventional pollutants to comply with BACT for greenhouse gases.

Court membership
- Chief Justice John Roberts Associate Justices Antonin Scalia · Anthony Kennedy; Clarence Thomas · Ruth Bader Ginsburg; Stephen Breyer · Samuel Alito; Sonia Sotomayor · Elena Kagan

Case opinions
- Majority: Scalia, joined by Roberts, Kennedy; Thomas, Alito (Parts I, II–A, and II–B–1); Ginsburg, Breyer, Sotomayor, Kagan (Part II–B–2)
- Concur/dissent: Breyer, joined by Ginsburg, Sotomayor, Kagan
- Concur/dissent: Alito, joined by Thomas

Laws applied
- Clean Air Act

Utility Air Regulatory Group v. Environmental Protection Agency, 573 U.S. 302 (2014), was a US Supreme Court case regarding the Environmental Protection Agency's regulation of air pollution under the Clean Air Act.

In a divided decision, the Court largely upheld the EPA's ability to regulate greenhouse emissions.

== Background ==
In 2007, the U.S. Supreme Court ruled in Massachusetts v. EPA that the Environmental Protection Agency has the authority to regulate greenhouse gas emissions if it determined that the emissions endangered public health. In 2010, the EPA introduced a new set of regulations designed to control carbon dioxide emissions from light and heavy vehicles as well as generators and industrial and utility sources. A coalition of power companies challenged the legality of the regulations by arguing that the science used by the EPA in deciding the regulations was inaccurate.

In 2012, a three-judge panel of the D.C. Circuit court unanimously rejected those challenges. In 2013, the case was accepted for review by the United States Supreme Court.

== Decision ==
Justice Scalia authored the majority opinion, which Justices Roberts and Kennedy joined in full. The Court ruled that the EPA can regulate greenhouse emissions on power plants and other large stationary sources of pollution but that it overstepped its authority when it started to use the same regulations on smaller stationary sources like shopping centers, apartment buildings, and schools.

In his opinion, Scalia noted that the Clean Air Act imposes specific requirements on stationary sources of pollution that have the potential to emit 250 tons per year of "any air pollutant" or 100 tons per year for certain types of sources. Furthermore, the "any air pollutant" language in that section of the law specifically refers to regulated air pollutants, not greenhouse emissions. When the EPA attempted to apply the same standards to any source of greenhouse emissions, the Court objected that "would radically expand those programs, making them both unadministrable and unrecognizable to the Congress that designed them." Instead, the EPA adopted a different threshold for sources of greenhouse emissions, 100,000 tons per year. However, the Court stated, "An agency has no power to 'tailor' legislation to bureaucratic policy goals by rewriting unambiguous statutory terms."

On the other hand, the Court ruled that the EPA could regulate the large sources of greenhouse emissions if they were already being regulated for emitting conventional pollutants. Scalia wrote that the "EPA may... continue to treat greenhouse gases as a 'pollutant subject to regulation'" under the provisions in the Act.

Justice Breyer wrote a concurring/dissenting opinion, joined by Ginsburg, Sotomayor, and Kagan. Breyer argued that the EPA should have been allowed to interpret the "any air pollutant" language broadly to include greenhouse emissions as well: "I do not agree with the Court that the only way to avoid an absurd or otherwise impermissible result in these cases is to create an atextual greenhouse gas exception to the phrase 'any air pollutant.'"

Alito, joined by Thomas, wrote a second concurring and dissenting opinion. They argued that the EPA should not be able to regulate the larger sources of greenhouse emissions by using those regulations: "The Clean Air Act was developed for use in regulating the emission of conventional pollutants and is simply not suited for use with respect to greenhouse gases." He cited two scenarios of incompatibility between greenhouses gases and normal pollutants, which eventually caused the EPA to declare that officials may disregard some provisions in the Act or to give authorities "a great deal of discretion."
