= Telecommunications tariff =

Controlled pricing

A telecommunications tariff is an open contract between a telecommunications service provider and the public, filed with a regulating body such as state and municipal Public Utilities Commissions and federal entities such as the Federal Communications Commission (FCC). Such tariffs outline the terms and conditions of providing telecommunications service to the public including rates, fees, and charges.

== Reasons for tariffs ==
At a minimum, tariffs imposed must cover the cost of providing the service to the consumer. The consumer may be the final user or an intermediary such as a service provider. If a telecommunications operator cannot recover its costs, it will make a loss and the company will go bankrupt. Tariffs must also be used to cover maintenance, additional research and other indirect costs associated with providing the service. However, telecommunications service providers must be careful not to over-price each service, as prices have a direct influence on demand for that service (see supply and demand). Such an operator must constantly balance the need to provide cheaper rates, especially if there is strong competition, with the cost of maintaining the service at an optimum quality that is acceptable to the customer. If an operator charges too much, it risks alienating its customers, resulting in a loss of traffic and therefore revenue; if they charge too little, they will have insufficient capital to maintain the network's quality of service. Over time this will result in customer attrition.

== Components of tariffs ==
Tariffing systems vary from country to country and company to company, but in general they are based on several simple principles. Tariffs are generally made up of two components:

- Standing charges: these are fixed charges that are used to pay for the cost of the connection to the nearest exchange and the equipment to monitor that customer's phone line or service connection. They are usually paid on a monthly basis, and called rental.
- Call charges: these charges are variable and are used to pay for the cost of the equipment to route a call from the caller's exchange to the recipient's exchange. These call charges can be calculated on a fixed per call basis, a variable basis depending on the time or distance of the call, or a combination of the two. Call charges can even vary at different times of the day. For many local calls the charge is zero; see flat rate.

These components form a basic tariff system but, as telecommunication advances, tariff structures become increasingly more complex. Usually there is the option of calling collect (in the UK known as reversing charges), where responsibility for charges normally paid by the caller is accepted by the recipient. Tariffs also depend on the bandwidth provided. For example, dial-up modem connections are charged at normal telephone costs, but connections such as DSL are usually charged using a completely different accounting system due to their always on nature.

== Special tariffs ==
Increasingly, in some countries, the call charges are fixed at a monthly rate and included as a supplement to the standing charges, known as inclusive calls.

Emergency calls can invariably be made without charge.

Most countries have a number sequence that enable the caller to make calls without charge, sometimes known as free calls or freephone, these are usually used by companies for their sales line (in the UK these are 0800 and 0808 numbers and in the US they are 800, 888, 877, 866, 855, 844 and 833).

Tariffs substantially in excess of the normal rate, known as premium rate, are used for information services, competition entries and pornography calls.

These telecommunications tariffs originated with the advent of public phone service. In these times, the services provided were less complex, and customers were able to simply read the tariffs to understand how much they would be charged for each type of call. Additionally, only a few telecommunication industries participated in the market, facilitating decision-making. As the market became increasingly competitive, the need for regulation decreased. In 2001, the U.S. Federal Communications Commission (FCC) declared the telecommunications market was fully competitive in the United States, and eliminated the need to file tariffs with federal regulatory agencies. However, to continue operating, many state and local governments still require telecommunications tariffs.

== Impact of tariffs on traffic ==
Call minutes are highly elastic against price, this means that the demand for call minutes varies greatly according to price. A slight decrease in price leads to a great increase in call minutes. The higher the price, the more this effect is noticeable, for both business and residential customers on international or local calls. This means that it is often the case that more revenue is achievable at lower prices, that is, E < -1.

Internet traffic research show that the traffic intensity is directly affected by the tariffs charged in connecting customers to their Internet service provider (ISP). For example, a circuit-switched network provider charges different tariffs at different times of the day. It was noted that at the time that the rates decreased, the traffic intensity logged by the ISP increased dramatically and then decayed over time at an exponential rate. The conclusion of the research was that by varying prices over time, a telecommunications service provider can reduce the level of the traffic intensity at peak periods, resulting in lower equipment costs because of the reduced need to provision to meet peak demand, which in turn leads to increases in long-term revenue and profitability. See Time-based pricing.
