= National Federation of Independent Business v. Occupational Safety and Health Administration =

National Federation of Independent Business v. Department of Labor, Occupational Safety and Health Administration Ohio v. Department of Labor, Occupational Safety and Health Administration
- Supreme Court of the United States

Argued January 7, 2022 Decided January 13, 2022
- Full case name: National Federation of Independent Business, et al. v. Department of Labor, Occupational Safety and Health Administration, et al. Ohio, et al. v. Department of Labor, Occupational Safety and Health Administration, et al.
- Docket nos.: 21A244; 21A247
- Citations: 595 U.S. 109 (more) 142 S. Ct. 661; 211 L. Ed. 2d 448; 2022 U.S. LEXIS 496
- Argument: Oral argument
- Decision: Opinion

Holding
- OSHA's vaccine mandate was an unlawful exercise of power, going beyond what Congress tasked it to regulate in the enabling statute.

Court membership
- Chief Justice John Roberts Associate Justices Clarence Thomas · Stephen Breyer; Samuel Alito · Sonia Sotomayor; Elena Kagan · Neil Gorsuch; Brett Kavanaugh · Amy Coney Barrett

Case opinions
- Per curiam
- Concurrence: Gorsuch, joined by Thomas, Alito
- Dissent: Breyer, Sotomayor, Kagan

National Federation of Independent Business v. Department of Labor, Occupational Safety and Health Administration, 595 U.S. 109 (2022), is a Supreme Court of the United States case before the Court on an application for a stay of the Occupational Safety and Health Administration's COVID-19 vaccination or test mandate. On January 13, 2022, the Supreme Court ordered a stay of the mandate.

== Background ==
In September 2021, President of the United States Joe Biden announced his administration would be promulgating a vaccination or test mandate for all private companies with 100 or more employees. The Occupational Safety and Health Administration announced its Emergency Temporary Standard (ETS) on November 5, 2021. On November 6, 2021, the United States Court of Appeals for the Fifth Circuit issued a nationwide stay of the ETS's implementation; it issued an opinion explaining its reasoning on November 12, 2021.

Challenges to OSHA regulations are randomly assigned to one of the twelve United States courts of appeals with geographic jurisdiction. The challenges to the COVID-19 ETS were all transferred to the United States Court of Appeals for the Sixth Circuit on November 16, 2021. The petitioners sought initial hearing en banc for consideration of the challenges. On December 15, 2021, the court denied the petition by an 8–8 vote, over the dissents of Chief Judge Jeffrey Sutton and Judge John K. Bush, joined by six additional judges.

On December 17, 2021, a panel of the court dissolved the Fifth Circuit's stay of the ETS by a 2–1 vote. Judge Joan Larsen dissented.

== Supreme Court ==
Numerous challengers filed emergency applications at the Supreme Court of the United States in the days after the Fifth Circuit's stay was dissolved. The federal government responded to the applications on December 30, 2021. In an unusual proceeding for emergency applications, oral argument was held on January 7, 2022. The National Federation of Independent Business, representing many private companies, and Ohio, representing more than 20 states, argued for the petitioners. The Supreme Court granted a stay of the ETS in a per curiam order on January 13, 2022. The order stated that the OSHA mandate exceeded the authority that it was given by Congress; OSHA could only regulate occupational safety, and the vaccine mandate was seen as "broad public health measures." The order stated that "Permitting OSHA to regulate the hazards of daily life — simply because most Americans have jobs and face those same risks while on the clock — would significantly expand OSHA’s regulatory authority without clear congressional authorization." In a concurring statement written by Justice Neil Gorsuch and joined by Justices Samuel Alito and Clarence Thomas, Gorsuch wrote that it should be up to states and Congress to decide best how to respond to a pandemic like COVID.

A joint dissent to the order was written by Justices Stephen Breyer, Sonia Sotomayor and Elena Kagan. They stated that employees have "little control, and therefore little capacity to mitigate risk", and that the ruling "stymies the Federal Government’s ability to counter the unparalleled threat that COVID-19 poses to our Nation’s workers." The three countered Gorsuch's statement and stated that OSHA was the actor with the best understanding of workplace in light of threat like COVID, and not the court system.

== See also ==
- Jacobson v. Massachusetts (1905), Supreme Court case allowing state power to mandate a smallpox vaccination.
- COVID-19 vaccination in the United States
- COVID-19 vaccination mandates in the United States
