= Hot oil =

Hot oil may refer to:

- Chili oil, a condiment made from vegetable oil
- Boiling oil or hot oil, an early thermal weapon
- Oil produced in violation of production restrictions established pursuant to the NIRA, see National Industrial Recovery Act#Legacy

- Panama Refining Co. v. Ryan, the "Hot Oil case", a 1935 United States Supreme Court case
- Connally Hot Oil Act of 1935

- Hot oil manicure

== See also ==
- Oil (disambiguation)
