= Making false statements =

Crime of intentionally lying to a federal investigator in the United States

Making false statements (18 U.S.C. § 1001) is the common name for the United States federal process crime laid out in Section 1001 of Title 18 of the United States Code, which generally prohibits knowingly and willfully making false or fraudulent statements, or concealing information, in "any matter within the jurisdiction" of the federal government of the United States, even by merely denying guilt when asked by a federal agent.

This statute is used in many contexts. Most commonly, prosecutors use this statute to reach cover-up crimes such as perjury, false declarations, and obstruction of justice and government fraud cases. A number of notable people have been convicted under the section, including Martha Stewart, Rod Blagojevich, Michael T. Flynn, Rick Gates, Scooter Libby, Bernard Madoff, and Jeffrey Skilling.

Its earliest progenitor was the False Claims Act of 1863. In 1934, the requirement of an intent to defraud was eliminated. This was to prosecute successfully, under the National Industrial Recovery Act of 1933 (NIRA), the producers of "hot oil", i.e. oil produced in violation of restrictions established by NIRA. In 1935, NIRA was declared unconstitutional by the Supreme Court in Panama Refining Co. v. Ryan and A.L.A. Schechter Poultry Corp. v. United States.

Pursuant to the decision in United States v. Gaudin (1995), the jury is to decide whether the false statements made were material, since materiality is an element of the offense.

== Overview ==
The statute spells out this purpose in subsection 18 U.S.C. § 1001(a), which states:

(a) Except as otherwise provided in this section, whoever, in any matter within the jurisdiction of the executive, legislative, or judicial branch of the Government of the United States, knowingly and willfully—

1. falsifies, conceals, or covers up by any trick, scheme, or device a material fact;
2. makes any materially false, fictitious, or fraudulent statement or representation; or
3. makes or uses any false writing or document knowing the same to contain any materially false, fictitious, or fraudulent statement or entry

shall be fined under this title, imprisoned not more than 5 years or, if the offense involves international or domestic terrorism (as defined in section 2331), imprisoned not more than 8 years, or both. If the matter relates to an offense under chapter 109A, 109B, 110, or 117, or section 1591, then the term of imprisonment imposed under this section shall be not more than 8 years.

In Bryson v. United States (1969), upholding conviction under 18 U.S.C. § 1001, the Supreme Court affirmed the right to remain silent but said that if the citizen chooses to answer a question, the answer given must be honest:

Our legal system provides methods for challenging the Government's right to ask questions—lying is not one of them. A citizen may decline to answer the question, or answer it honestly, but he cannot with impunity knowingly and willfully answer with a falsehood.

Even constitutionally explicit Fifth Amendment rights against self-incrimination do not exonerate affirmative false statements. In Brogan v. United States (1998), the Supreme Court rejected the "exculpatory no" doctrine that had previously been followed by seven of the courts of appeal, which had held that "the mere denial of wrongdoing" did not fall within the scope of § 1001.

== Convictions ==
A number of notable people have been convicted under the section, including Martha Stewart, Rod Blagojevich, Scooter Libby, Bernard Madoff, Michael Cohen, and Jeffrey Skilling. Many famous people have been charged under this law, including Najibullah Zazi (whose lying charge was later dropped after more serious charges were preferred against him), and Ali Saleh Kahlah al-Marri.

In the wake of such cases, many observers have concluded that it is best for anyone with the slightest degree of criminal exposure to refrain from submitting to an interview by government agents. Solomon L. Wisenberg suggests simply asking for the agent's business card and saying, "[M]y attorney will be in contact with you." The invocation of counsel (i.e., refusing to speak to law enforcement without a lawyer present) cannot be used against a defendant at trial.

== Jurisdiction ==
The jurisdictional element of the crime is defined as the "right to say and the power to act". It applies to criminal investigations, such as false statements made in response to an inquiry by an FBI or other federal agent, or made voluntarily to an agent.

Courts have affirmed § 1001 convictions for false statements made to private entities receiving federal funds or subject to federal regulation or supervision.

== History ==
The earliest statutory progenitor of §1001 was the original False Claims Act, adopted as the Act of March 2, 1863, 12 Stat. 696. That enactment made it a criminal offense for any person, whether a civilian or a member of the military services, to:

… present or cause to be presented for payment or approval to or by any person or officer in the civil or military service of the United States, any claim upon or against the Government of the United States, or any department or officer thereof, knowing such claim to be false, fictitious, or fraudulent …

It was completely reworded by Pub. L. 65–228, 40 Stat. 1015, enacted October 23, 1918, which amended the statute to read:

… or whoever, for the purpose of obtaining or aiding to obtain the payment or approval of such claim, or for the purpose and with the intent of cheating and swindling or defrauding the Government of the United States, or any department thereof, or any corporation in which the United States of America is a stockholder, shall knowingly and willfully falsify or conceal or cover up by any trick, scheme, or device a material fact, or make or cause to be made any false or fraudulent statements or representations, or make or use or cause to be made or used any false bill, receipt, voucher, roll, account, claim, certificate, affidavit, or deposition, knowing the same to contain any fraudulent or fictitious statement or entry …

In 1934, the requirement of an intent to defraud was eliminated at the request of the Secretary of the Interior Harold Ickes, who wished to use the statute to enforce Section 9(c) of the National Industrial Recovery Act of 1933 (NIRA) against producers of "hot oil", oil produced in violation of production restrictions established pursuant to the NIRA, when Pub. L. 73–394, 48 Stat. 996, enacted June 18, 1934, amended it to read:

… or whoever~~, for the purpose of obtaining or aiding to obtain the payment or approval of such claim, or for the purpose and with the intent of cheating and swindling or defrauding the Government of the United States, or any department thereof, or any corporation in which the United States of America is a stockholder,~~ shall knowingly and willfully falsify or conceal or cover up by any trick, scheme, or device a material fact, or make or cause to be made any false or fraudulent statements or representations, or make or use or cause to be made or used any false bill, receipt, voucher, roll, account, claim, certificate, affidavit, or deposition, knowing the same to contain any fraudulent or fictitious statement or entry, in any matter within the jurisdiction of any department or agency of the United States or of any corporation in which the United States of America is a stockholder …

When Title 18 of the United States Code was adopted in 1948, the wording was further simplified and replaced with:

Whoever, in any matter within the jurisdiction of any department or agency of the United States knowingly and willfully falsifies, conceals or covers up by any trick, scheme, or device a material fact, or makes any false, fictitious or fraudulent statements or representations, or makes or uses any false writing or document knowing the same to contain any false, fictitious or fraudulent statement or entry …

== See also ==
- Mail and wire fraud
