= Separation of powers under the United States Constitution =

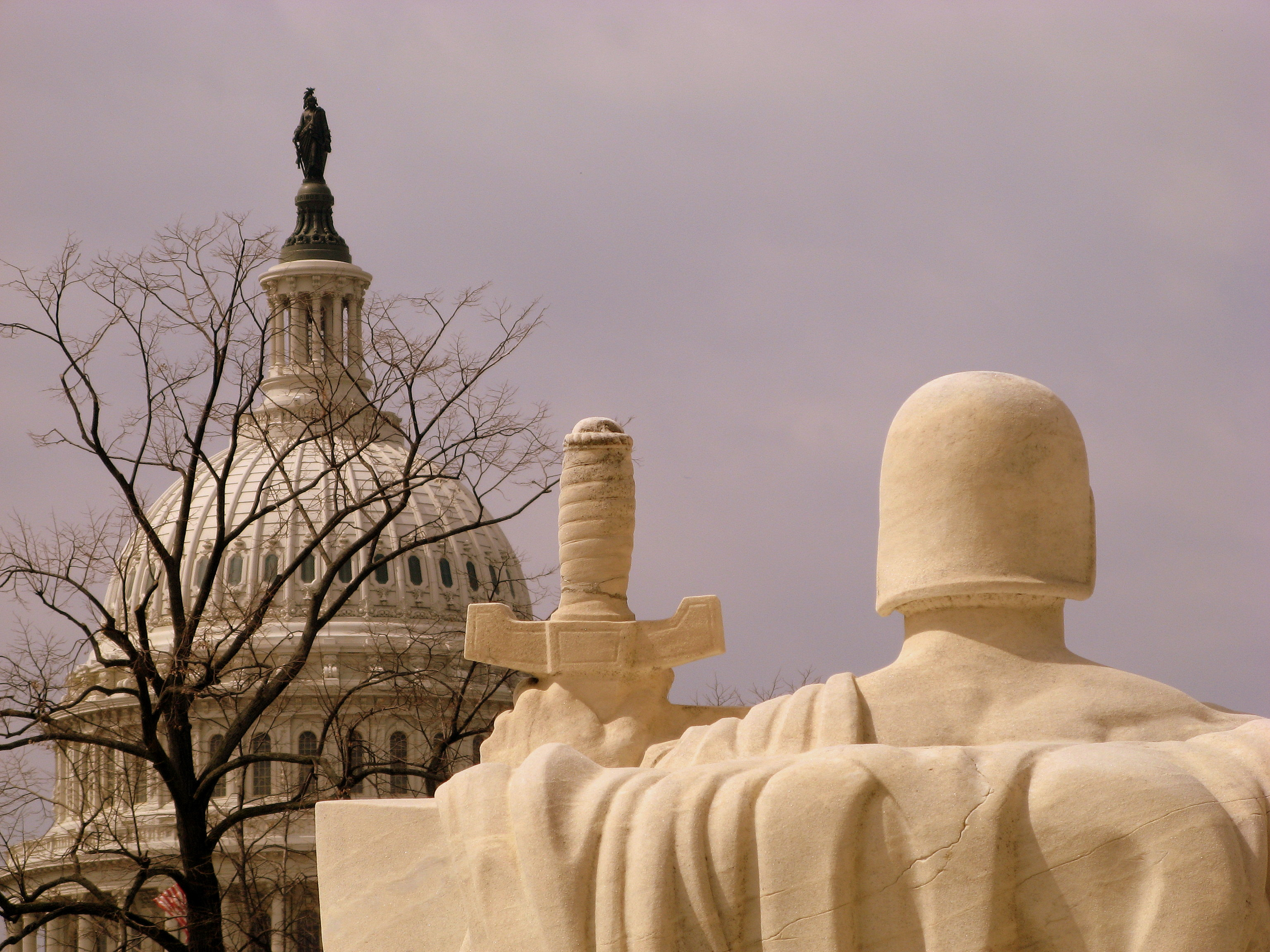
The United States Capitol dome as seen from the Supreme Court Building

U.S. Supreme Court Justice Antonin Scalia testified before the Senate Judiciary Committee about separation of powers and checks and balances of the U.S. Government.

Separation of powers is a political doctrine originating in the writings of Charles de Secondat, Baron de Montesquieu in The Spirit of the Laws, in which he argued for a constitutional government with three separate branches, each of which would have defined authority to check the powers of the others. This philosophy heavily influenced the United States Constitution, according to which the Legislative, Executive, and Judicial branches of the United States government are kept distinct to prevent abuse of power. The American form of separation of powers is associated with a system of checks and balances.

During the Age of Enlightenment, philosophers such as Montesquieu advocated the principle in their writings, whereas others, such as Thomas Hobbes, strongly opposed it. Montesquieu was one of the foremost supporters of separating the legislature, the executive, and the judiciary. His writings considerably influenced the Founding Fathers of the United States, such as Alexander Hamilton and James Madison, who participated in the Constitutional Convention of 1787, which drafted the Constitution.

Some U.S. states did not observe a strict separation of powers in the 18th century. In New Jersey, the governor also functioned as a member of the state's highest court and as the presiding officer of one house of the New Jersey Legislature. The president of Delaware was a member of the Court of Appeals; the presiding officers of the two houses of the state legislature also served in the executive department as vice presidents. In both Delaware and Pennsylvania, members of the executive council served at the same time as judges. On the other hand, many southern states explicitly required the separation of powers. Maryland, Virginia, North Carolina and Georgia all kept the branches of government "separate and distinct."

== Legislative power ==

Congress has the sole power to legislate for the United States. Under the nondelegation doctrine, Congress may not delegate its lawmaking responsibilities to any other agency. In this vein, the Supreme Court held in the 1998 case Clinton v. City of New York that Congress could not delegate a "line-item veto" to the President, by powers vested in the government by the Constitution.

Where Congress does not make great and sweeping delegations of its authority, the Supreme Court has been less stringent. One of the earliest cases involving the exact limits of non-delegation was Wayman v. Southard, 23 U.S. (10 Wet.) 1, 42 (1825). Congress had delegated to the courts the power to prescribe judicial procedure; it was contended that Congress had thereby unconstitutionally clothed the judiciary with legislative powers. While Chief Justice John Marshall conceded that the determination of rules of procedure was a legislative function, he distinguished between "important" subjects and mere details. Marshall wrote that "a general provision may be made, and power is given to those who are to act under such general provisions, to fill up the details."

Marshall's words and future court decisions gave Congress much latitude in delegating powers. It was not until the 1930s that the Supreme Court held a delegation of authority unconstitutional. In a case involving the creation of the National Recovery Administration called A.L.A. Schechter Poultry, 295 U.S. 495 (1935), Congress could not authorize the president to formulate codes of "fair competition." It was held that Congress must set some standards governing the actions of executive officers. The Court, however, has deemed that phrases such as "just and reasonable," "public interest," and "public convenience" suffice.

== Executive power ==

Executive power is vested, with exceptions and qualifications, in the President. By law (Section 2.) the president becomes the Commander in Chief of the Army and Navy, Militia of several states when called into service, has power to make treaties and appointments to office "with the Advice and Consent of the Senate," receive Ambassadors and Public Ministers, and "take care that the laws be faithfully executed" (Section 3.) By using these words, the Constitution does not require the president to personally enforce the law; rather, officers subordinate to the president may perform such duties. The Constitution empowers the president to ensure the faithful execution of the laws made by Congress and approved by the President. Congress may itself terminate such appointments by impeachment and restrict the president. Bodies such as the War Claims Commission (created by the War Claims Act of 1948), the Interstate Commerce Commission, and the Federal Trade Commission—all quasi-judicial—often have direct Congressional oversight.

Congress often writes legislation to restrain executive officials from performance their duties, as laid out by the laws Congress passes. In Immigration and Naturalization Service v. Chadha (1983), the Supreme Court decided (a) The prescription for legislative action in Art. I, § 1—requiring all legislative powers to be vested in a Congress consisting of a Senate and a House of Representatives—and § 7—requiring every bill passed by the House and Senate, before becoming law, to be presented to the president, and, if he disapproves, to be repassed by two-thirds of the Senate and House—represents the Framers' decision that the legislative power of the Federal Government be exercised in accord with a single, finely wrought and exhaustively considered procedure. This procedure is an integral part of the constitutional design for the separation of powers. Further rulings clarified the case; even if both Houses acting together cannot override Executive vetoes without a 2/3 majority. Legislation may always prescribe regulations governing executive officers.

== Judicial power ==

Judicial power—the power to decide cases and controversies—is vested in the Supreme Court and inferior courts established by Congress. The judges must be appointed by the president with the advice and consent of the Senate, hold office during good behavior and receive compensation that may not be diminished during their continuance in office. If a court's judges do not have such attributes, the court may not exercise judicial power of the United States. Courts exercising the judicial power are called "constitutional courts."

However, because Congress controls the budget, jurisdiction, and structure of the federal courts, the judiciary as a branch is better described as largely dependent on Congress rather than independent of it. Although the Constitution, not Congress, creates the Supreme Court, it is Congress that decides whether to create lower federal courts, how to arrange them, how many judges will be appointed to them, and whether to abolish them. Congress also has the power to grant jurisdiction to and withdraw jurisdiction from lower federal courts. Moreover, although judges have the power to issue final judgments, they must rely on the executive for enforcement.

Congress may also establish "legislative courts," which do not take the form of judicial agencies or commissions, whose members do not have the same security of tenure or compensation as the constitutional court judges. Legislative courts may not exercise the judicial power of the United States. In Murray's Lessee v. Hoboken Land & Improvement Co. (1856), the Supreme Court held that a legislative court may not decide "a suit at the common law, or in equity, or admiralty," as such a suit is inherently judicial. Legislative courts may only adjudicate "public rights" questions (cases between the government and an individual and political determinations).

== Checks and balances ==
Legislative

- Writes and enacts laws
- Enacts taxes, authorizes borrowing, and sets the budget
- Has sole power to declare war
- May start investigations, especially against the President
- The Senate confirms presidential appointments of federal judges, executive department heads, ambassadors, and many other officers, subject to confirmation by the Senate
- The Senate ratifies treaties
- The House of Representatives may impeach, and the Senate may remove, executive and judicial officers
- Creates federal courts except for the Supreme Court, and sets the number of justices on the Supreme Court
- May override presidential vetoes

Executive

- May veto laws
- Vice president presides over the Senate
- Wages war at the direction of Congress
- Makes decrees or declarations (for example, declaring a state of emergency) and promulgates lawful regulations and executive orders
- Influences other branches of its agenda with the State of the Union address.
- Appoints federal judges, executive department heads, ambassadors, and various other officers
- Has power to grant pardons to convicted persons
- Executes and enforces the law.

Judicial

- Determines which laws Congress intended to apply to any given case
- Determines whether a law is unconstitutional or constitutional. (The power of judicial review is not expressly granted in the Constitution, but was held by the judiciary to be implicit in the constitutional structure in Marbury v. Madison (1803).)
- Determines how Congress meant the law to apply to disputes
- Determines how a law acts to determine the disposition of prisoners
- Determines how a law acts to compel testimony and the production of evidence
- Determines how laws should be interpreted to assure uniform policies in a top-down fashion via the appeals process, but gives discretion in individual cases to low-level judges (The amount of discretion depends upon the standard of review, determined by the type of case in question.)
- Polices its own members

=== Executive ===
The president exercises a check over Congress through their power to veto bills, but Congress may override any veto (excluding the so-called "pocket veto") by a two-thirds majority in each house. When the two houses of Congress cannot agree on a date for adjournment, the president may settle the dispute. Either house or both houses may be called into emergency session by the president. The Vice President serves as president of the Senate, but they may only vote to break a tie.

The president, as noted above, appoints judges with the Senate's advice and consent. They also have the power to issue pardons and reprieves. Such pardons are not subject to confirmation by either the House of Representatives or the Senate, or even to acceptance by the recipient. The President is not mandated to carry out the orders of the Supreme Court. The Supreme Court does not have any enforcement power; the enforcement power lies solely with the executive branch. Thus, the executive branch can place a check on the Supreme Court through refusal to execute the orders of the court. However the prestige of the Court makes that difficult to do.

The president is the civilian Commander in Chief of the Army and Navy of the United States. They have the authority to command them to take appropriate military action in the event of a sudden crisis. However, only the Congress is explicitly granted the power to declare war per se, as well as to raise, fund and maintain the armed forces. Congress also has the duty and authority to prescribe the laws and regulations under which the armed forces operate, such as the Uniform Code of Military Justice, and requires that all Generals and Admirals appointed by the president be confirmed by a majority vote of the Senate before they can assume their office.

=== Judicial ===
Courts check both the executive branch and the legislative branch through judicial review. This concept is not written into the Constitution, but was envisioned by many of the Constitution's Framers (for example, The Federalist Papers mention it). The Supreme Court established a precedent for judicial review in Marbury v. Madison. There were protests by some at this decision, born chiefly of political expediency, but political realities in the particular case paradoxically restrained opposing views from asserting themselves. For this reason, precedent alone established the principle that a court may strike down a law it deems unconstitutional.

A common misperception is that the Supreme Court is the only court that may determine constitutionality; the power is exercised even by the inferior courts. But only Supreme Court decisions are binding across the nation. Decisions of a Court of Appeals, for instance, are binding only in the circuit over which the court has jurisdiction.

The power to review the constitutionality of laws may be limited by Congress, which has the power to set the jurisdiction of the courts. The only constitutional limit on Congress' power to set the jurisdiction of the judiciary relates to the Supreme Court; the Supreme Court may exercise only appellate jurisdiction except in cases involving states and cases affecting foreign ambassadors, ministers or consuls.

The Chief Justice presides in the Senate during a president's impeachment trial. The rules of the Senate, however, generally do not grant much authority to the presiding officer. Thus, the Chief Justice's role in this regard is a limited one.

McCulloch v. Maryland, decided in 1819, established two important principles, one of which explains that states cannot make actions to impede on valid constitutional exercises of power by the federal government. The other explains that Congress has the implied powers to implement the express powers written in the Constitution to create a functional national government. All three branches of the US government have certain powers and those powers relate to the other branches of government. One of these powers is called the express powers. These powers are expressly given, in the Constitution, to each branch of government. Another power is the implied powers. These powers are those that are necessary to perform expressed powers. There are also inherent and concurrent powers. Inherent powers are those that are not found in the Constitution yet the different branches of government can still exercise them. Concurrent powers are those that are given to both state and federal governments. There are also powers that are not lined out in the Constitution that are given to the federal government. These powers are then given to the states in a system called federalism.

Congress is one of the branches of government so it has a lot of powers of its own that it uses to pass laws and establish regulations. These include express, implied, and concurrent powers. It uses its express powers to regulate bankruptcies, business between states and other nations, the armed forces, and the National Guard or militia. They also establish all laws necessary and proper for carrying out other powers. In addition to this Congress makes laws for naturalization. Implied powers are used to keep the regulation of taxes, the draft, immigration, protection of those with disabilities, minimum wage, and outlaw discrimination. Congress's inherent powers are used to control national borders, deal with foreign affairs, acquire new territories, defend the state from revolution, and decide the exclusion or establishment of aliens. Concurrent powers makes it so that both federal and state governments can create laws, deal with environmental protection, maintain national parks and prisons, and provide a police force.

The judicial branch of government holds powers as well. They have the ability to use express and concurrent powers to make laws and establish regulations. They use express powers to interpret laws and perform judicial review. Implied powers are used by this branch to declare laws that were previously passed by a lower court unconstitutional. They can also use express powers to declare laws that are in the process of being passed unconstitutional. Concurrent powers are used to make it so that state courts can conduct trials and interpret laws without the approval of federal courts and federal courts can hear appeals form lower state courts.

The executive branch also has powers of its own that they use to make laws and establish regulations. The powers that are used in this branch are express, implied, and inherent. The President uses express powers to approve and veto bills and to make treaties as well. The President is constitutionally obligated to make sure that laws are faithfully executed and uses their powers to do just this. He uses implied powers to issue executive orders and enter into treaties with foreign nations. The executive branch uses inherent powers to establish executive privilege, which means that they can enforce statutes and laws already passed by Congress. They can also enforce the Constitution and treaties that were previously made by other branches of government.

The system of checks and balances makes it so that no one branch of government has more power than another and cannot overthrow another. It creates a balance of power that is necessary for a government to function, if it is to function well. This, in most situations, makes it so that each branch is held to a certain standard of conduct. If a branch of the government thinks that what another branch is doing is unconstitutional, they can "call them out" so to say. Each branch is able to look at the other branches wrongdoing and change it to meet the needs of the people whom they serve. Humans as a whole have a history of abusing positions of power but the system of checks and balances makes it so much more difficult to do so. Also, as there is more than one person running each branch gives room for debate and discussion before decisions are made within a single branch. Even so, some laws have been made and then retracted because they were an abuse of the power given to that particular branch. The people that created these laws had been serving a selfish agenda when forming these laws instead of looking out for the welfare of those people that they were supposed to be protecting by making certain laws. While this is a horrible scenario, it does happen. That does not mean that it cannot be fixed though. Indeed, it can be, by another branch of government stepping up to right the wrongs that had been done.

The federal government is fully capable to intervene in affairs of Native Americans on reservations to some extent. Their ability to create and enforce treaties makes it so that they can interact with the Native Americans and build a treaty that works for both parties and make reservations for the Native Americans to live on and make it so that the people that would live on the reservation not be interrupted by the outside world and be able to live their lives as they please. This responsibility also falls on to the states as well. This happens because the federal government is the one that creates the treaties but the reservations are then put in the jurisdiction of the states. The states are then responsible for maintaining the relationships with the Native Americans on those reservations and to honor the treaties that were previously made by the federal government.

== Equality of the branches ==
The Constitution does not explicitly indicate the pre-eminence of any particular branch of government. However, James Madison wrote in Federalist 51, regarding the ability of each branch to defend itself from actions by the others, that "it is not possible to give to each department an equal power of self-defense. In republican government, the legislative authority necessarily predominates."

One may claim that the judiciary has historically been the weakest of the three branches. In fact, its power to exercise judicial review—its sole meaningful check on the other two branches—is not explicitly granted by the U.S Constitution. The U.S. Supreme Court exercised its power to strike down congressional acts as unconstitutional only twice prior to the Civil War: in Marbury v. Madison (1803) and Dred Scott v. Sandford (1857). The Supreme Court has since then made more extensive use of judicial review.

Throughout America's history dominance of one of the three branches has essentially been a see-saw struggle between Congress and the president. Both have had periods of great power and weakness such as immediately after the Civil War when republicans had a majority in Congress and were able to pass major legislation and shoot down most of the president's vetoes. They also passed acts to essentially make the president subordinate to Congress, such as the Tenure of Office Act. Johnson's later impeachment also cost the presidency much political power. However the president has also exercised greater power largely during the 20th century. Both Roosevelts greatly expanded the powers of the president and wielded great power during their terms.

The first six presidents of the United States did not make extensive use of the veto power: George Washington only vetoed two bills, James Monroe one, and John Adams, Thomas Jefferson and John Quincy Adams none. James Madison, a firm believer in a strong executive, vetoed seven bills. None of the first six Presidents, however, used the veto to direct national policy. It was Andrew Jackson, the seventh President, who was the first to use the veto as a political weapon. During his two terms in office, he vetoed 12 bills—more than all of his predecessors combined. Furthermore, he defied the Supreme Court in enforcing the policy of ethnically cleansing Native American tribes ("Indian Removal"); he stated (perhaps apocryphally), "John Marshall has made his decision. Now let him enforce it!"

Some of Jackson's successors made no use of the veto power, while others used it intermittently. It was only after the Civil War that presidents began to use the power to truly counterbalance Congress. Andrew Johnson, a Democrat, vetoed several Reconstruction bills passed by the "Radical Republicans." Congress, however, managed to override fifteen of Johnson's twenty-nine vetoes. Furthermore, it attempted to curb the power of the presidency by passing the Tenure of Office Act. The Act required Senate approval for the dismissal of senior Cabinet officials. When Johnson deliberately violated the Act, which he felt was unconstitutional (Supreme Court decisions later vindicated such a position), the House of Representatives impeached him; he was acquitted in the Senate by one vote.

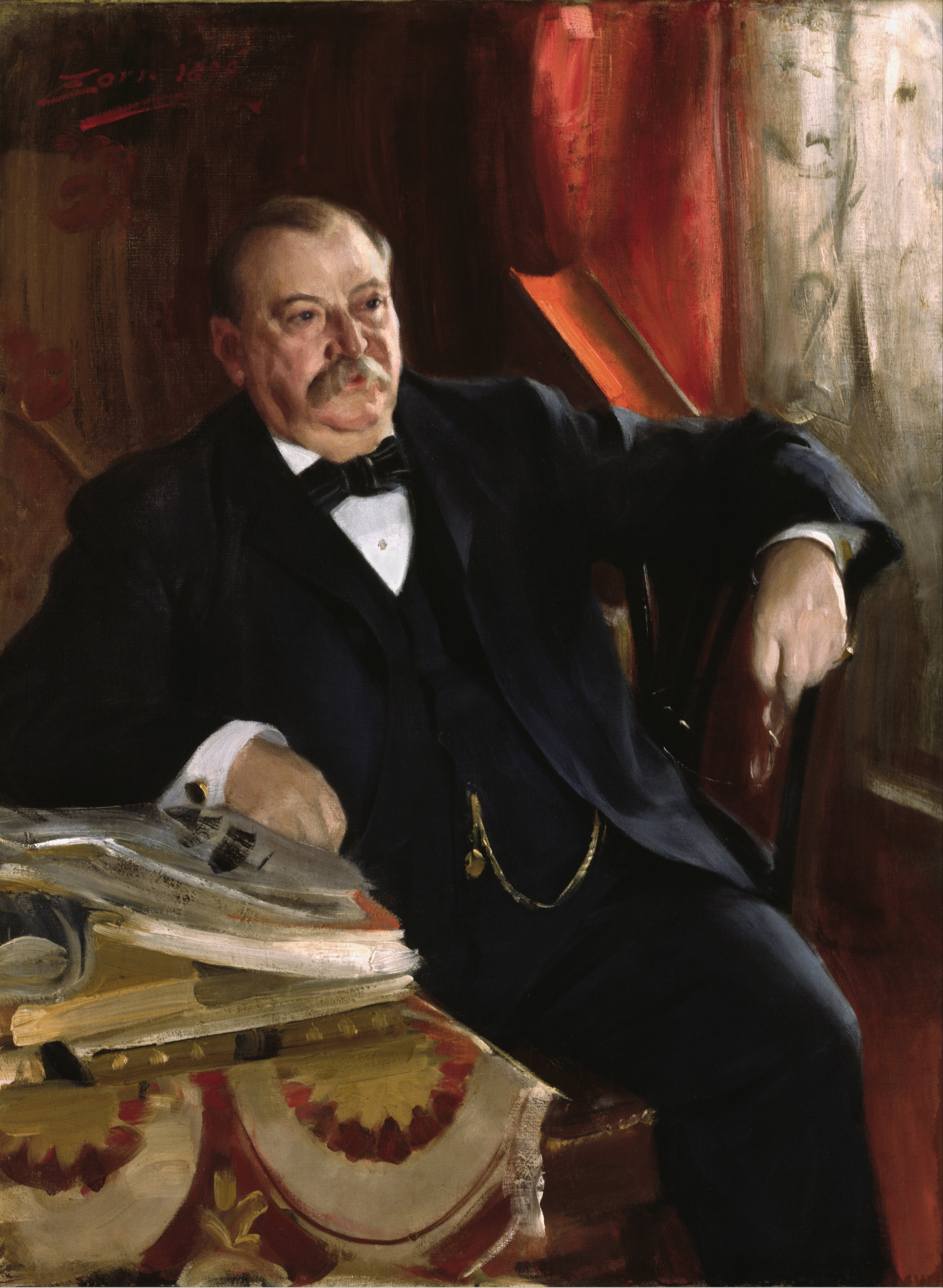
Grover Cleveland worked to restore power to the Presidency after Andrew Johnson's impeachment.

Johnson's impeachment was perceived to have done great damage to the presidency, which came to be almost subordinate to Congress. Some believed that the president would become a mere figurehead, with the Speaker of the House of Representatives becoming a de facto prime minister. Grover Cleveland, the first Democratic President following Johnson, attempted to restore the power of his office. During his first term, he vetoed over 400 bills—twice as many bills as his 21 predecessors combined. He also began to suspend bureaucrats who were appointed as a result of the patronage system, replacing them with more "deserving" individuals. The Senate, however, refused to confirm many new nominations, instead demanding that Cleveland turn over the confidential records relating to the suspensions. Cleveland steadfastly refused, asserting, "These suspensions are my executive acts ... I am not responsible to the Senate, and I am unwilling to submit my actions to them for judgment." Cleveland's popular support forced the Senate to back down and confirm the nominees. Furthermore, Congress finally repealed the controversial Tenure of Office Act that had been passed during the Johnson Administration. Overall, this meant that Cleveland's Administration marked the end of presidential subordination.

Several 20th-century presidents have attempted to greatly expand the power of the presidency. Theodore Roosevelt, for instance, claimed that the president was permitted to do whatever was not explicitly prohibited by the law—in direct contrast to his immediate successor, William Howard Taft. Franklin Delano Roosevelt held considerable power during the Great Depression. Congress had granted Franklin Roosevelt sweeping authority; in Panama Refining v. Ryan, the Court for the first time struck down a Congressional delegation of power as violative of the doctrine of separation of powers. The aforementioned Schechter Poultry Corp. v. United States, another separation of powers case, was also decided during Franklin Roosevelt's presidency. In response to many unfavorable Supreme Court decisions, Roosevelt introduced a "Court Packing" plan, under which more seats would be added to the Supreme Court for the president to fill. Such a plan (which was defeated in Congress) would have seriously undermined the judiciary's independence and power.

Richard Nixon used national security as a basis for his expansion of power. He asserted, for example, that "the inherent power of the President to safeguard the security of the nation" authorized him to order a wiretap without a judge's warrant. Nixon also asserted that "executive privilege" shielded him from all legislative oversight; furthermore, he impounded federal funds (that is to say, he refused to spend money that Congress had appropriated for government programs). In the specific cases aforementioned, however, the Supreme Court ruled against Nixon. This was also because of an ongoing criminal investigation into the Watergate tapes, even though they acknowledged the general need for executive privilege. Since then, Nixon's successors have sometimes asserted that they may act in the interests of national security or that executive privilege shields them from Congressional oversight. Though such claims have in general been more limited than Nixon's, one may still conclude that the presidency's power has been greatly augmented since the 18th and 19th centuries.

== Views on separation of powers ==
Many political scientists believe that separation of powers is a decisive factor in what they see as a limited degree of American exceptionalism. In particular, John W. Kingdon made this argument, claiming that separation of powers contributed to the development of a unique political structure in the United States. He attributes the unusually large number of interest groups active in the United States, in part, to the separation of powers; it gives groups more places to try to influence, and creates more potential group activity. He also cites its complexity as one of the reasons for lower citizen participation.

== Judicial independence ==
Separation of powers has again become a current issue of some controversy concerning debates about judicial independence and political efforts to increase the accountability of judges for the quality of their work, avoiding conflicts of interest, and charges that some judges allegedly disregard procedural rules, statutes, and higher court precedents.

Many legislators hold the view that separation of powers means that powers are shared among different branches; no one branch may act unilaterally on issues (other than perhaps minor questions), but must obtain some form of agreement across branches. That is, it is argued that "checks and balances" apply to the Judicial branch as well as to the other branches—for example, in the regulation of attorneys and judges, and the establishment by Congress of rules for the conduct of federal courts, and by state legislatures for state courts. Although in practice these matters are delegated to the Supreme Court, the Congress holds these powers and delegates them to the Supreme Court only for convenience in light of the Supreme Court's expertise, but can withdraw that delegation at any time.

On the other side of this debate, many judges hold the view that separation of powers means that the Judiciary is independent and untouchable within the judicial sphere. In this view, separation of powers means that the Judiciary alone holds all powers relative to the judicial function and that the Legislative and Executive branches may not interfere in any aspect of the Judicial branch. An example of the second view at the state level is found in the Florida Supreme Court holding that only the Florida Supreme Court may license and regulate attorneys appearing before the courts of Florida, and only the Florida Supreme Court may set rules for procedures in the Florida courts. The State of New Hampshire also follows this system.

== See also ==
- Constitution of the Roman Republic
- Commander-in-Chief
- Fourth branch of government
- The Imperial Presidency
- Signing statement
- Unitary executive theory
