= J. W. Hampton, Jr. & Co. v. United States =

J. W. Hampton, Jr., & Co. v. United States
- Supreme Court of the United States

Argued March 1, 1928 Decided April 9, 1928
- Full case name: J. W. Hampton, Jr. & Company v. United States
- Citations: 276 U.S. 394 (more) 48 S. Ct. 348; 72 L. Ed. 624; 1928 U.S. LEXIS 284

Court membership
- Chief Justice William H. Taft Associate Justices Oliver W. Holmes Jr. · Willis Van Devanter; James C. McReynolds · Louis Brandeis; George Sutherland · Pierce Butler; Edward T. Sanford · Harlan F. Stone

Case opinion
- Majority: Taft, joined by a unanimous court

J. W. Hampton, Jr. & Co. v. United States, 276 U.S. 394 (1928), is a landmark case in the United States in which the Supreme Court of the United States ruled that congressional delegation of legislative authority is an implied power of Congress that is constitutional so long as Congress provides an "intelligible principle" to guide the executive branch.

Congress has the authority to legislate and regulate commerce and customs dues. § 315 of the Tariff Act (42 Stat. 858) delegated authority to the Executive to raise the rate fixed by the statute (the "flexible tariff provision"). Delegation of rate-fixing to commissions was not unusual, and customs duties are similar to rate-fixing, Justice Taft said: "If it is thought wise to vary the customs duties according to changing conditions of production at home and abroad, it may authorize the Chief Executive to carry out this purpose, with the advisory assistance of a Tariff Commission appointed under Congressional authority."

== See also ==
- Separation of powers under the United States Constitution
- Fordney–McCumber Tariff
- Gundy v. United States
