= Henry Harriman =

Henry Harriman may refer to:

- Henry Harriman (Mormon) (1804–1891), one of the First Seven Presidents of the Seventy of The Church of Jesus Christ of Latter-day Saints
- Henry I. Harriman (1873–1950), president of the U.S. Chamber of Commerce
