= Nondelegation doctrine =

Theory of constitutional law

The doctrine of nondelegation (or non-delegation principle) is the theory that one branch of government must not authorize another entity to exercise the power or function which it is constitutionally authorized to exercise itself. It is explicit or implicit in all written constitutions that impose a strict structural separation of powers. It is usually applied in questions of constitutionally improper delegations of powers of one branch of government to another branch, to the administrative state, or to private entities. Although it is usually constitutional for executive officials to delegate executive powers to executive branch subordinates, there can also be improper delegations of powers within an executive branch.

In the United Kingdom, the non-delegation principle refers to the prima facie presumption that statutory powers granted to public bodies by Parliament cannot be delegated to other people or bodies.

== Australia ==
Australian federalism does not permit the federal Parliament or government to delegate its powers to state parliaments or governments. However, it does permit a state parliament to delegate its powers to the federal parliament by means of section 51(xxxvii) of the Australian Constitution.

== Canada ==
Canadian federalism does not permit Parliament or the provincial legislatures to delegate their powers to each other. See: Attorney General of Nova Scotia v. Attorney General of Canada, [1951] S.C.R. 31

== United States ==
In the federal government of the United States, the nondelegation doctrine is the theory that the Congress of the United States, being vested with "all legislative powers" by Article One, Section 1 of the United States Constitution, cannot delegate that power to anyone else. The scope of this restriction has been the subject of dispute. The Supreme Court ruled in J. W. Hampton, Jr. & Co. v. United States (1928) that congressional delegation of legislative authority is an implied power of Congress that is constitutional so long as Congress provides an "intelligible principle" to guide the executive branch:

"In determining what Congress may do in seeking assistance from another branch, the extent and character of that assistance must be fixed according to common sense and the inherent necessities of the government co-ordination." So long as Congress "shall lay down by legislative act an intelligible principle to which the person or body authorized to [exercise the delegated authority] is directed to conform, such legislative action is not a forbidden delegation of legislative power."

Eric Posner and Adrian Vermeule in 2002 further argued that the restriction is only that the legislature cannot delegate the authority to vote on legislation or execute other de jure powers of the legislature. Further, they argue that the grant of power to the executive branch is never a transfer of legislative power but rather an exercise of legislative power.

For example, the Food and Drug Administration (FDA) is an agency in the executive branch created by Congress with the power to regulate food and drugs in the United States. Congress has given the FDA a broad mandate to ensure the safety of the public and prevent false advertising, but it is up to the agency to assess risks and declare prohibitions on harmful additives, and to determine the process by which actions will be brought based on the same. Similarly, the Internal Revenue Service has been given the responsibility of collecting taxes that are assessed under the Internal Revenue Code. Although Congress has determined the amount of the tax to be assessed, it has delegated to the IRS the authority to determine how such taxes are to be collected. The nondelegation doctrine has been used in such cases to argue against the constitutionality of expanding bureaucratic power. Some scholars argue the nondelegation doctrine has proven popular in state courts, but with two exceptions in 1935, legal scholars argue that the doctrine is not evident in federal courts. This trend began to reverse due to the views of Chief Justice John Roberts, who joined Justice Gorsuch's dissenting opinion in Gundy v. United States. In Gundy, the Court upheld a provision of the Sex Offender Registration and Notification Act, authorizing the attorney general "to prescribe rules" concerning offenders who would have to register as sex offenders. However, Gorsuch argued that the statutory provision violated the nondelegation doctrine because it was not one of three exceptions to the nondelegation doctrine.

=== President vs. Congress ===
In his 2021 book Contested Ground, Berkeley Law Professor Daniel Farber discusses the limits of presidential power in the United States. Throughout history, the doctrine of non-delegation has always been opposed to the unlimited exercise of power by the respective president. Already during his lifetime, Abraham Lincoln was denounced as a would-be dictator and the legality of his Civil War actions was questioned. Presidential power and its abuses have been in a special spotlight since Watergate. President of both parties have tested the limits, i.e. Bush with his war on terror, Obama with DACA, and Trump with his travel ban against Muslims in the first term or his worldwide tariffs in the second term.

=== Case law ===
==== Pre-1935 ====
The origins of the nondelegation doctrine, as interpreted in U.S., can be traced back to at least 1690, when John Locke wrote:

The Legislative cannot transfer the Power of Making Laws to any other hands. For it being but a delegated Power from the People, they, who have it, cannot pass it over to others. ... And when the people have said, We will submit to rules, and be govern'd by Laws made by such Men, and in such Forms, no Body else can say other Men shall make Laws for them; nor can the people be bound by any Laws but such as are Enacted by those, whom they have Chosen, and Authorised to make Laws for them. The power of the Legislative being derived from the People by a positive voluntary Grant and Institution, can be no other, than what the positive Grant conveyed, which being only to make Laws, and not to make Legislators, the Legislative can have no power to transfer their Authority of making laws, and place it in other hands.

One of the earliest cases involving the exact limits of nondelegation was Wayman v. Southard (1825). Congress had delegated to the courts the power to prescribe judicial procedure; it was contended that Congress had thereby unconstitutionally clothed the judiciary with legislative powers. While Chief Justice John Marshall conceded that the determination of rules of procedure was a legislative function, he distinguished between "important" subjects and mere details. Marshall wrote that "a general provision may be made, and power given to those who are to act under such general provisions, to fill up the details." In 1892, the Court in Field v. Clark, 143 U.S. 649, noted "That congress cannot delegate legislative power to the president is a principle universally recognized as vital to the integrity and maintenance of the system of government ordained by the constitution" while holding that the tariff-setting authority delegated in the McKinley Act "was not the making of law", but rather empowered the executive branch to serve as a "mere agent" of Congress.

==== 1935 ====
During the 1930s, Congress provided the executive branch with wide powers to combat the Great Depression. The Supreme Court case of Panama Refining v. Ryan, 293 U.S. 388 (1935) involved the National Industrial Recovery Act, which included a provision granting the President the authority to prohibit the interstate shipment of petroleum in excess of certain quotas. In the Panama Refining case, however, the Court struck down the provision on the ground that Congress had set "no criterion to govern the President's course".

Other provisions of the National Industrial Recovery Act were also challenged. In Schechter Poultry Corp. v. United States (1935), the Supreme Court considered a provision which permitted the President to approve trade codes, drafted by the businesses themselves, so as to ensure "fair competition". The Supreme Court found that, since the law sets no explicit guidelines, businesses "may roam at will and the President may approve or disapprove their proposal as he may see fit". Thus, they struck down the relevant provisions of the Recovery Act.

==== Post-1935 ====
In the 1989 case Mistretta v. United States, the Court stated that:

Applying this "intelligible principle" test to congressional delegations, our jurisprudence has been driven by a practical understanding that in our increasingly complex society, replete with ever changing and more technical problems, Congress simply cannot do its job absent an ability to delegate power under broad general directives. Accordingly, this Court has deemed it "constitutionally sufficient" if Congress clearly delineates the general policy, the public agency which is to apply it, and the boundaries of this delegated authority.

The Supreme Court has never found a violation of the nondelegation doctrine outside of Panama Refining and Schechter Poultry in 1935. Exemplifying the Court's legal reasoning on this matter, it ruled in the 1998 case Clinton v. City of New York that the Line Item Veto Act of 1996, which authorized the President to selectively void portions of appropriation bills, was a violation of the Presentment Clause, which sets forth the formalities governing the passage of legislation. Although the Court noted that the attorneys prosecuting the case had extensively discussed the nondelegation doctrine, the Court declined to consider that question. However, Justice Kennedy, in a concurring opinion, wrote that he would have found the statute to violate the exclusive responsibility for laws to be made by Congress.

==== Important cases ====
- Cargo of the Brig Aurora v. United States, 11 U.S. (7 Cranch) 382 (1813)
- Wayman v. Southard, 23 U.S. (10 Wheat.) 1 (1825)
- Field v. Clark, 143 U.S. 649 (1892)
- Buttfield v. Stranahan, 192 U.S. 470 (1904)
- United States v. Grimaud, 220 U.S. 506 (1911)
- Mahler v. Eby, 264 U.S. 32 (1924)
- J. W. Hampton, Jr. & Co. v. United States, 276 U.S. 394 (1926)
- New York Central Securities Corp. v. United States, 287 U.S. 12 (1932)
- Panama Refining Co. v. Ryan, 293 U.S. 388 (1935)
- A.L.A. Schechter Poultry Corp. v. United States, 295 U.S. 495 (1935)
- Carter v. Carter Coal Co., 298 U.S. 238 (1936)
- United States v. Curtiss-Wright Export Corp., 299 U.S. 304 (1936)
- Currin v. Wallace, 306 U.S. 1 (1939)
- Sunshine Anthracite Coal Co. v. Adkins, 310 U.S. 381 (1940)
- OPP Cotton Mills, Inc. v. Administrator of Wage and Hour Div., Dept. of Labor, 312 U.S. 126 (1941)
- National Broadcasting Co. v. United States, 319 U.S. 190 (1943)
- Yakus v. United States, 321 U.S. 414 (1944)
- Lichter v. United States, 334 U.S. 742 (1948)
- U.S. ex rel. Knauff v. Shaughnessy, 338 U.S. 537 (1950)
- National Cable Television Assn. v. United States, 415 U.S. 336 (1974)
- FPC v. New England Power Co., 415 U.S. 345 (1974)
- Federal Energy Administration v. Algonquin SNG, Inc., 426 U.S. 548 (1976)
- United States v. Batchelder, 442 U.S. 114 (1979)
- Industrial Union Department v. American Petroleum Institute, 448 U.S. 607 (1980)
- American Textile Mfrs. Inst., Inc. v. Donovan, 452 U.S. 490 (1981)
- Mistretta v. United States, 488 U.S. 361 (1989)
- Skinner v. Mid-America Pipeline Co., 490 U.S. 212 (1989)
- Touby v. United States, 500 U.S. 160 (1991)
- Metropolitan Washington Airports Authority v. Citizens for Abatement of Aircraft Noise, Inc., 501 U.S. 252 (1991)
- Loving v. United States, 517 U.S. 748 (1996)
- Clinton v. City of New York, 524 U.S. 417 (1998)
- Whitman v. American Trucking Ass'ns, Inc., 531 U.S. 457 (2001)
- Department of Transportation v. Association of American Railroads, No. 13-1080, 575 U.S. ___ (2015)
- Coventry Health Care of Mo., Inc. v. Nevils, No. 16-149, 581 U.S. ___ (2017)
- Gundy v. United States, No. 17-6086, 588 U.S. ___ (2019)
- Paul v. United States, No. 17-8830, 589 U.S. ___ (2019)
- Haaland v. Brackeen, No. 21-376, 599 U.S. ___ (2023)
- SEC v. Jarkesy, No. 22-859, 603 U.S. ___ (2024)
- FCC v. Consumers' Research, No. 24-354, 604 U.S. ___ (2024)

=== Major questions doctrine ===
The major questions doctrine is another doctrine that restricts Congressional delegation of legislative authority to agencies. It says that when a government agency seeks to decide an issue of "vast economic or political significance", a vague or general delegation of authority from Congress is not enough. Rather, the agency must have clear statutory authorization to decide the issue.

The major questions doctrine served as an exception to the Chevron doctrine, which (until it was overturned in 2024) ordinarily required courts to defer to an agency's interpretation of a statute it enforces, so long as the statute is ambiguous and the agency's interpretation is reasonable. However, it went further than just negating deference to the agency. Even if the most reasonable interpretation of the statute allowed the agency to take an action, it would not be enough unless that delegation of authority is clearly stated.

In explaining the major questions doctrine in UARG v. EPA (2014), the Supreme Court explained that "We expect Congress to speak clearly if it wishes to assign to an agency decisions of vast 'economic and political significance'." Similarly, in Whitman v. American Trucking Associations (2001), the Court stated that Congress "does not alter the fundamental details of a regulatory scheme in vague terms or ancillary provisions—it does not, one might say, hide elephants in mouseholes."

The Supreme Court first explicitly embraced the phrase "major questions doctrine" in West Virginia v. Environmental Protection Agency (2022), the decision which held that the EPA's Clean Power Plan, requiring energy producers to shift from fossil fuels to renewable sources, was not authorized by the Clean Air Act.

With the Inflation Reduction Act of 2022, some commentators argued that Congress overruled the Court by clarifying that carbon dioxide is one of the pollutants covered by the 1970 Clean Air Act. However, the Supreme Court had already held that greenhouse gasses are pollutants in Massachusetts v. EPA (2007), and the Supreme Court did not overrule that holding in West Virginia v. EPA.

==== Important cases ====
- MCI Telecommunications Corp. v. AT&T Co., 512 U.S. 218 (1994)
- FDA v. Brown & Williamson Tobacco Corp., 529 U.S. 120 (2000)
- Gonzales v. Oregon, 546 U.S. 243 (2006)
- Utility Air Regulatory Group v. Environmental Protection Agency, 573 U.S. 302 (2014)
- King v. Burwell, No. 14-114, 576 U.S. ___ (2015)
- Gundy v. United States, No. 17-6086, 588 U.S. ___ (2019) (Gorsuch, dissenting) (dicta)
- Alabama Assn. of Realtors v. Department of Health and Human Servs., No. 21A23, 594 U.S. ___ (2021)
- Biden v. Missouri, No. 21A240, 595 U.S. ___ (2022)
- National Federation of Independent Business v. Department of Labor, Occupational Safety and Health Administration, No. 21A244, 595 U.S. ___ (2022)
- West Virginia v. EPA, No. 20-1530, 597 U.S. ___ (2022)
- Biden v. Nebraska, No. 22-506, 600 U.S. ___ (2023)
- Learning Resources v. Trump (2025)

== United Kingdom ==
In general, powers granted by Parliament are presumed to only be exercisable by the body which is given those powers and can not be delegated. This is known as the "non-delegation principle" or the "presumption against delegation".

For example, in Barnard v National Dock Labour Board [1953] 2 QB 18, the Court of Appeal held that the delegation of disciplinary powers originally granted to the London Dock Labour Board to the port manager was unlawful. In his judgment, Lord Denning argued that the power of suspension was a judicial function. The dock labour board had to receive reports from employers and investigate them, they had to inquire whether the accused was guilty of misconduct, and they had to decide the appropriate disciplinary action to take. And as "[n]o judicial tribunal can delegate its functions unless it is enabled to do so expressly or by necessary implication", the delegation of the disciplinary powers was held to be unlawful.

=== Exceptions to the non-delegation principle ===
==== Consultation as opposed to delegation ====
English courts have made a distinction between seeking consultation and the delegation of powers, the former of which is deemed to be permissible as decision making does not happen within an "institutional bubble". The important factor in deciding whether a public body is seeking consultation or whether they have delegated those powers is examining whether the powers are ultimately at the hands of the decision-maker in practice, as opposed to de jure.

In R (New London College) v Secretary of State for the Home Department [2013] UKSC 51, the Supreme Court held that the Home Secretary did not unlawfully delegate her powers to control entry into the UK to sponsoring institutions. Immigration rules dictated that all student visa applicants had to produce a "Confirmation of Studies" (CAS) which is produced by sponsoring institutions like universities. As part of the application process, institutions must make judgements whether they had an intention to study there. The Supreme Court rejected arguments that this was tantamount to the delegation of powers to sponsoring institutions. Lord Sumption, in his judgment, noted that "a significant number of Tier 4 (General) migrants with a CAS are in fact refused leave to enter or remain on these grounds". This, according to the Supreme Court, showed that the Home Secretary de facto exercised powers of final decision and therefore was merely consulting sponsoring institutions, not delegating her powers.

==== The Carltona doctrine ====
The Carltona doctrine (or Carltona principle) is the idea that when powers are granted to departmental officials, they can be lawfully delegated to their civil servants.

== See also ==
- Whitman v. American Trucking Associations, Inc.
- Amalgamated Meat Cutters v. Connally
- Chevron deference
- INS v. Chadha (1983)
