= Buttfield v. Stranahan =

- Supreme Court of the United States

Decided February 23, 1904
- Full case name: Buttfield v. Stranahan
- Citations: 192 U.S. 470 (more)

Holding
- The Tea Inspection Act was constitutional. Congress's power to regulate foreign trade is virtually unlimited under the Commerce Clause, it was not an impermissible delegation to the executive branch, and the enforcement of a standard is not a taking without due process of law.

Court membership
- Chief Justice Melville Fuller Associate Justices John M. Harlan · David J. Brewer; Henry B. Brown · Edward D. White; Rufus W. Peckham · Joseph McKenna; Oliver W. Holmes Jr. · William R. Day

Case opinion
- Majority: White, joined by unanimous
- Brewer, Brown took no part in the consideration or decision of the case.

Laws applied
- Tea Inspection Act

Buttfield v. Stranahan, 192 U.S. 470 (1904), was a United States Supreme Court case in which the court held that the Tea Inspection Act was constitutional. Congress's power to regulate foreign trade is virtually unlimited under the Commerce Clause, it was not an impermissible delegation to the executive branch, and the enforcement of a standard is not a taking without due process of law.

== Background ==
The Tea Inspection Act of March 2, 1897 (Note: 29 Stat. 604.) forbade the importation of any tea "inferior in purity, quality, and fitness for consumption" as compared with a legal standard.

On January 20, 1902, eight packages of tea were imported into the port of New York by a firm of which the Buttfield was the general partner. The tea was entered for import at the New York custom-house and was stored in a bonded warehouse. At that time, legal standards under the Tea Inspection Act selected by the Board of Tea Inspectors, had been put in force by the Treasury.

The eight packages of tea in question were within the "Country green teas" class, numbered 7 on list of standards. Within that class, there was a numbered list from 1 to 17 of varieties arranged from highest to lowest quality, and low-quality teas were prohibited. The tea was examined on February 7, 1902, and was rejected as "inferior to standard in quality." The term quality here meant its taste and flavor. The importer appealed to the Board of General Appraisers, and that board, on March 10, 1902, certified to the collector that "the said tea is inferior in quality to the standard prescribed by law," and accordingly denied the appeal.

In November, Buttfield applied to the collector for permission to withdraw the tea for consumption, on payment of the duties. The request was refused. Buttfield then applied for the release of the tea from bond in order to export it. This was also refused on the ground that the tea had been finally rejected under the Tea Inspection Act more than six months before this application. Buttfield was also notified that the tea would be destroyed. Buttfield sued in the Supreme Court of the State of New York, County of New York, against the collector of the Port of New York, to recover damages for the alleged wrongful seizure, removal and destruction of the tea. Because the case was about federal revenue laws, the collector removed the case to the United States District Court for the Southern District of New York.

At trial, the chairman of the Board of Tea Experts of the Treasury Department testified as to how the tea rated on the standard, and the parties argued about the interpretation of the standard. At the close of the evidence, the court overruled a motion to direct a verdict for Buttfield. Thereupon the court, granting a motion to direct a verdict for the collector, ruled that the only question was as to the constitutionality of the Tea Inspection Act. Upon the judgment, the case was appealed directly to the Supreme Court.

== Opinion of the court ==
The Supreme Court issued an opinion on February 23, 1904.

== Later developments ==
Considered a "leading" case in its time, Buttfield is now lesser known. It was the first case to articulate the "as far as reasonably practicable" standard of the nondelegation doctrine.
