= Connally Hot Oil Act of 1935 =

Law to regulate oil production and transportation to stabilize prices

Connally Hot Oil Act
- Long title: An Act to prohibit the transportation in interstate and foreign commerce of petroleum produced in violation of State law, and for other purposes.
- Nicknames: Hot Oil Act
- Enacted by: the 74th United States Congress

Citations
- Public law: Pub. L. 74–20
- Statutes at Large: 49 Stat. 30

Codification
- Titles amended: Title 15 of the United States Code
- U.S.C. sections created: 15 U.S.C. §§ 715–715l

Legislative history
- Introduced in the Senate as S. 259 by Sen. Tom Connally (D–TX) on January 1935; Committee consideration by Senate Interstate Commerce, House Interstate, and Foreign Commerce; Passed the Senate on February 1935; Passed the House on February 1935; Signed into law by President Franklin D. Roosevelt on February 22, 1935

The Connally Hot Oil Act of 1935 was enacted in the wake of the Supreme Court's decision to strike down Section 9(c) of the National Industrial Recovery Act (NIRA) in Panama Refining Co. v. Ryan. The act gave the president authority "to prohibit the transportation in interstate and foreign commerce of petroleum ... produced or withdrawn from storage in excess of the amount permitted ... by any State law." The act was named after Senator Tom Connally.

It revived the provisions of Section 9(c) of the NIRA and added procedural safeguards, which, the Supreme Court argued, were constitutional. Ostensibly enacted to protect the industry from "contraband oil", it was mainly a way of cartelizing the industry to stabilize falling prices. The new law reestablished the NIRA's original provision that violators would receive a maximum jail sentence of six months but also increased the maximum fine penalty from $1,000 - which was enacted in the NIRA - to $2,000.

Though the legislation was intended to expire on June 16, 1937, it was maintained afterwards as a permanent law. There was some debate as to the law's effects on the transport of other fuels such as coal and timber, and many independent oil producers vehemently opposed the government regulations.

In 1937, four federal courts upheld the Connally Act, which was later administered by the Federal Petroleum Board, also created by the law, within the Department of the Interior.

== See also ==
- New Deal
- Corporatism
