= OYL =

OYL or Oyl may refer to:

== OYL ==
OYL may refer to:

- OYL Industries, a former air conditioner manufacturer
- Ontario Young Liberals

== Oyl ==
Oyl is a surname. Notable people with the surname include:

- Olive Oyl, cartoon character
- Castor Oyl, brother of Olive

== See also ==
- Oil (disambiguation)
