= Henry I. Harriman House =

Historic house in Massachusetts, United States

- U.S. National Register of Historic Places
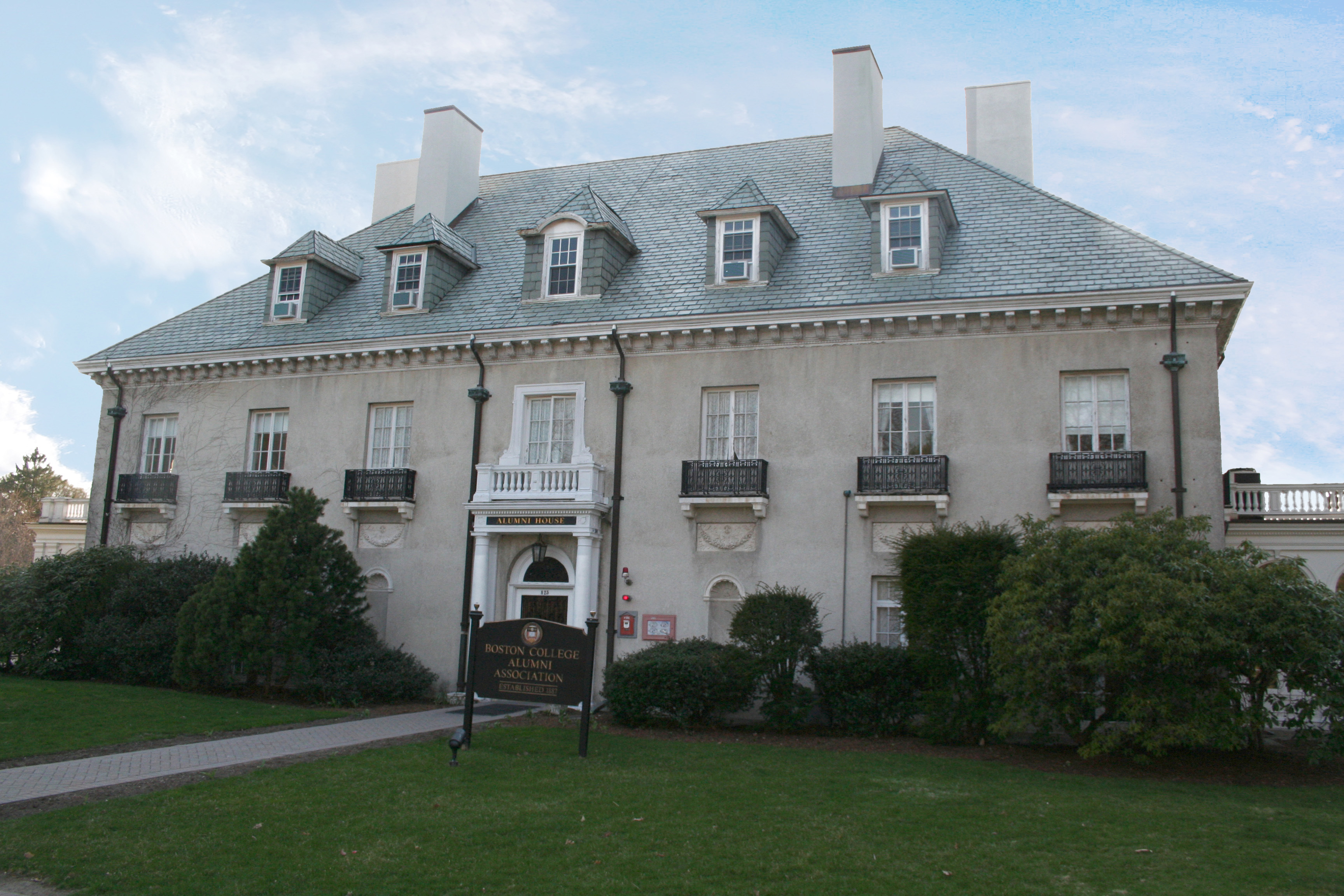

- Location within Massachusetts Location within the United States
- Location: 825 Centre St., Newton, Massachusetts
- Coordinates: 42°20′38.6″N 71°11′31.3″W
- Built: 1916
- Architect: Barnard, John
- Architectural style: French Eclectic
- MPS: Newton MRA
- NRHP reference No.: 90000028
- Added to NRHP: February 16, 1990

The Henry I. Harriman House is a historic French château style house at 825 Centre Street in Newton, Massachusetts. Built in 1916 for Henry I. Harriman, it is one of Newton's most elegant 20th-century suburban estate houses. It is now part of the campus of the Boston College Law School. It was known as Putnam House, in honor of benefactor Roger Lowell Putnam, when the campus was that of Newton College of the Sacred Heart. It was listed on the National Register of Historic Places in 1990.

== Description and history ==
The Harriman House is located on the campus of the Boston College Law School, just west of Centre Street, and south of Colby Road, which separates the campus from that of the Newton Day School of the Sacred Heart. The house is fully integrated into the campus and has not retained any other elements of the original Harriman estate. The house is a 2 1/2-story stuccoed structure, seven bays wide, with a steep hip roof pierced by a series of hip-roof dormers. The cornice is highlighted by a band of egg-and-dart moulding. The entrance, centered on the facade, is sheltered by a balustraded portico supported by Tuscan columns, and set in an arched opening. There are sunporches attached to both sides of the building.

The house was built for power company executive Henry I. Harriman (who later became president of the United States Chamber of Commerce). The architect was John Barnard and the landscape architect was Arthur Shurtleff, both of Boston. It was the first major commission for Barnard, a local architect, and its success led to a number other high-profile commissions. The house was acquired in 1950 by the Newton College of the Sacred Heart (founded 1946), and integrated into its campus. In 1967 the school dedicated the building a major benefactor, Roger Lowell Putnam. The school merged with Boston College in 1974, which uses the campus to house its law school. The building is identified on its maps as "825 Centre Street".

== See also ==
- National Register of Historic Places listings in Newton, Massachusetts
