= List of United States Supreme Court cases, volume 192 =

Supreme Court of the United States
- Interactive map of Supreme Court of the United States
- 38°53′26″N 77°00′16″W
- Established: March 4, 1789; 236 years ago
- Location: Washington, D.C.
- Coordinates: 38°53′26″N 77°00′16″W
- Composition method: Presidential nomination with Senate confirmation
- Authorised by: Constitution of the United States, Art. III, § 1
- Judge term length: life tenure, subject to impeachment and removal
- Number of positions: 9 (by statute)
- Website: supremecourt.gov

This is a list of cases reported in volume 192 of United States Reports, decided by the Supreme Court of the United States in 1904.

== Justices of the Supreme Court at the time of volume 192 U.S. ==
The Supreme Court is established by Article III, Section 1 of the Constitution of the United States, which says: "The judicial Power of the United States, shall be vested in one supreme Court . . .". The size of the Court is not specified; the Constitution leaves it to Congress to set the number of justices. Under the Judiciary Act of 1789 Congress originally fixed the number of justices at six (one chief justice and five associate justices). Since 1789 Congress has varied the size of the Court from six to seven, nine, ten, and back to nine justices (always including one chief justice).

When the cases in volume 192 were decided the Court comprised the following nine members:

Portrait	Justice	Office	Home State	Succeeded	Date confirmed by the Senate (Vote)	Tenure on Supreme Court
	Melville Fuller	Chief Justice	Illinois	Morrison Waite	July 20, 1888 (41–20)	October 8, 1888 – July 4, 1910 (Died)
	John Marshall Harlan	Associate Justice	Kentucky	David Davis	November 29, 1877 (Acclamation)	December 10, 1877 – October 14, 1911 (Died)
	David Josiah Brewer	Associate Justice	Kansas	Stanley Matthews	December 18, 1889 (53–11)	January 6, 1890 – March 28, 1910 (Died)
	Henry Billings Brown	Associate Justice	Michigan	Samuel Freeman Miller	December 29, 1890 (Acclamation)	January 5, 1891 – May 28, 1906 (Retired)
	Edward Douglass White	Associate Justice	Louisiana	Samuel Blatchford	February 19, 1894 (Acclamation)	March 12, 1894 – December 18, 1910 (Continued as chief justice)
	Rufus W. Peckham	Associate Justice	New York	Howell Edmunds Jackson	December 9, 1895 (Acclamation)	January 6, 1896 – October 24, 1909 (Died)
	Joseph McKenna	Associate Justice	California	Stephen Johnson Field	January 21, 1898 (Acclamation)	January 26, 1898 – January 5, 1925 (Retired)
	Oliver Wendell Holmes Jr.	Associate Justice	Massachusetts	Horace Gray	December 4, 1902 (Acclamation)	December 8, 1902 – January 12, 1932 (Retired)
	William R. Day	Associate Justice	Ohio	George Shiras Jr.	February 23, 1903 (Acclamation)	March 2, 1903 – November 13, 1922 (Retired)

== Citation style ==
Under the Judiciary Act of 1789 the federal court structure at the time comprised District Courts, which had general trial jurisdiction; Circuit Courts, which had mixed trial and appellate (from the US District Courts) jurisdiction; and the United States Supreme Court, which had appellate jurisdiction over the federal District and Circuit courts—and for certain issues over state courts. The Supreme Court also had limited original jurisdiction (i.e., in which cases could be filed directly with the Supreme Court without first having been heard by a lower federal or state court). There were one or more federal District Courts and/or Circuit Courts in each state, territory, or other geographical region.

The Judiciary Act of 1891 created the United States Courts of Appeals and reassigned the jurisdiction of most routine appeals from the district and circuit courts to these appellate courts. The Act created nine new courts that were originally known as the "United States Circuit Courts of Appeals." The new courts had jurisdiction over most appeals of lower court decisions. The Supreme Court could review either legal issues that a court of appeals certified or decisions of court of appeals by writ of certiorari.

Bluebook citation style is used for case names, citations, and jurisdictions.

- "# Cir." = United States Court of Appeals
  - e.g., "3d Cir." = United States Court of Appeals for the Third Circuit
- "C.C.D." = United States Circuit Court for the District of . . .
  - e.g.,"C.C.D.N.J." = United States Circuit Court for the District of New Jersey
- "D." = United States District Court for the District of . . .
  - e.g.,"D. Mass." = United States District Court for the District of Massachusetts
- "E." = Eastern; "M." = Middle; "N." = Northern; "S." = Southern; "W." = Western
  - e.g.,"C.C.S.D.N.Y." = United States Circuit Court for the Southern District of New York
  - e.g.,"M.D. Ala." = United States District Court for the Middle District of Alabama
- "Ct. Cl." = United States Court of Claims
- The abbreviation of a state's name alone indicates the highest appellate court in that state's judiciary at the time.
  - e.g.,"Pa." = Supreme Court of Pennsylvania
  - e.g.,"Me." = Supreme Judicial Court of Maine

== List of cases in volume 192 U.S. ==
Case Name	Page & year	Opinion of the Court	Concurring opinion(s)	Dissenting opinion(s)	Lower Court	Disposition
Gonzales v. Williams	1 (1904)	Fuller	none	none	C.C.S.D.N.Y.	reversed
Sinclair v. District of Columbia	16 (1904)	Fuller	none	none	D.C. Cir.	dismissed
New York ex rel. Pennsylvania R.R. Co. v. Knight	21 (1904)	Brewer	none	none	N.Y. Sup. Ct.	affirmed
Wabash R.R. Co. v. Flannigan	29 (1904)	White	none	none	Mo. Ct. App.	dismissed
Benziger v. United States	38 (1904)	Peckham	none	none	2d Cir.	reversed
Postal T.C. Co. v. Borough of New Hope	55 (1904)	Peckham	none	none	Pa.	reversed
Postal T.C. Co. v. Borough of Taylor	64 (1904)	Peckham	none	none	Pa.	reversed
Citizens' Bank v. Parker	73 (1904)	McKenna	none	Brewer	La.	reversed
Joplin v. Chachere	94 (1904)	McKenna	none	none	La.	affirmed
Cronin v. Adams	108 (1904)	McKenna	none	none	Colo.	affirmed
Cronin v. City of Denver	115 (1904)	McKenna	none	none	Colo.	affirmed
McIntire v. McIntire	116 (1904)	Holmes	none	none	D.C. Cir.	affirmed
German et al. Soc'y v. Dormitzer	125 (1904)	Holmes	none	none	Wash.	affirmed
James v. Appel	129 (1904)	Holmes	none	none	Sup. Ct. Terr. Ariz.	affirmed
New York et al. Bank v. Massey	138 (1904)	Day	none	none	2d Cir.	reversed
Royal Ins. Co. v. Martin	149 (1904)	Harlan	none	none	D.P.R.	reversed
Ward v. Sherman	168 (1904)	Brewer	none	none	Sup. Ct. Terr. Ariz.	reversed
Wabash R.R. Co. v. Pearce	179 (1904)	Brewer	none	none	Mo. Ct. App.	reversed
Crossman v. Lurman	189 (1904)	White	none	none	N.Y. Sup. Ct.	affirmed
Stanislaus Cnty. v. San Joaquin et al. Co.	201 (1904)	Peckham	none	none	C.C.N.D. Cal.	reversed
Bedford v. United States	217 (1904)	McKenna	none	none	Ct. Cl.	affirmed
Rogers v. Alabama	226 (1904)	Holmes	none	none	Ala.	reversed
Shappirio v. Goldberg	232 (1904)	Day	none	none	D.C. Cir.	affirmed
Commercial Nat'l Bank v. Weinhard	243 (1904)	Day	none	none	Or.	affirmed
Chesebrough v. United States	253 (1904)	Fuller	none	none	S.D.N.Y.	affirmed
Singer Mfg. Co. v. Cramer	265 (1904)	White	none	none	9th Cir.	reversed
South Dakota v. North Carolina	286 (1904)	Brewer	none	White	original	judgment for S.D.
United States v. California et al. Co.	355 (1904)	Holmes	none	Fuller	C.C.D. Or.	reversed
Thomas v. United States	363 (1904)	Fuller	none	none	C.C.S.D.N.Y.	affirmed
Bankers' M.C. Co. v. Minneapolis et al. Ry. Co.	371 (1904)	Fuller	none	none	8th Cir.	dismissed
Brunswick T. Co. v. National Bank	386 (1904)	Fuller	none	none	4th Cir.	affirmed
Spreckels S.R. Co. v. McClain	397 (1904)	Harlan	none	none	3d Cir.	reversed
Cornell v. Coyne	418 (1904)	Brewer	none	Harlan	C.C.N.D. Ill.	affirmed
Northern P. Ry. Co. v. Adams	440 (1904)	Brewer	none	none	9th Cir.	reversed
St. Clair Cnty. v. Interstate et al. Co.	454 (1904)	White	none	none	C.C.S.D. Ill.	affirmed
Buttfield v. Stranahan	470 (1904)	White	none	none	C.C.S.D.N.Y.	affirmed
Buttfield v. Bidwell	498 (1904)	White	none	none	C.C.S.D.N.Y.	affirmed
Buttfield v. United States	499 (1904)	White	none	none	E.D.N.Y.	affirmed
American S. & W. Co. v. Speed	500 (1904)	White	none	none	Tenn.	affirmed
United States v. St. Anthony R.R. Co.	524 (1904)	Peckham	none	none	9th Cir.	reversed
United States ex rel. Steinmetz v. Allen	543 (1904)	McKenna	none	none	D.C. Cir.	reversed
Ex parte Frasch	566 (1904)	McKenna	none	none	D.C. Cir.	mandamus denied
Central S.Y. Co. v. Louisville & N.R.R. Co.	568 (1904)	Holmes	none	none	6th Cir.	affirmed
Wedding v. Meyler	573 (1904)	Holmes	none	none	Ky. Cir. Ct.	reversed
Adams v. New York	585 (1904)	Day	none	none	N.Y. Sup. Ct.	affirmed

== See also ==
- Certificate of division
