= Brogan v. United States =

- Supreme Court of the United States

Argued December 2, 1997 Decided January 26, 1998
- Full case name: James Brogan v. United States
- Citations: 522 U.S. 398 (more) 118 S. Ct. 805; 139 L. Ed. 2d 830

Case history
- Prior: United States v. Wiener, 96 F.3d 35 (2d Cir. 1996); cert. granted, 520 U.S. 1263 (1997).

Holding
- 18 U.S.C. § 1001 does not permit the use of an "exculpatory no."

Court membership
- Chief Justice William Rehnquist Associate Justices John P. Stevens · Sandra Day O'Connor; Antonin Scalia · Anthony Kennedy; David Souter · Clarence Thomas; Ruth Bader Ginsburg · Stephen Breyer

Case opinions
- Majority: Scalia, joined by Kennedy, Thomas, Rehnquist, O'Connor, Souter (in part)
- Concurrence: Souter (in part and in the judgment)
- Concurrence: Ginsburg (in the judgment), joined by Souter
- Dissent: Stevens, joined by Breyer

Laws applied
- 18 U.S.C. § 1001, U.S. Const. amend. V

Brogan v. United States, 522 U.S. 398 (1998), is a United States Supreme Court case in which the Court ruled that the Fifth Amendment does not protect the right of those being questioned by law enforcement officials to deny wrongdoing falsely.

== Majority opinion ==
The case determined the ultimate status of the “exculpatory no," a right found by several circuit courts, which courts claimed that Section 1001 of Title 18 of the United States Code should be interpreted as the law not applying to those who simply deny wrongdoing. In the majority opinion, Justice Scalia explained that although others have interpreted the law to apply only to situations in which the lie "pervert[s] government functions," the language of the statute is clear, and the court had no power to overrule the wording of the statute, as created by Congress, even if the law was being used beyond its intended purpose.

The court also ruled that the Fifth Amendment does not apply in this situation. The Fifth Amendment must be explicitly indicated. It gives the person involved the right to remain silent but not the right to make an explicit lie.

== Concurring opinion ==
Justice Ginsburg, joined by Justice Souter, argued that although Section 1001 is written such that its relevance in this case is incontrovertible, the current wording of Section 1001 leads to unreasonable and unintended circumstances like that of Brogan and so it should be rewritten. She detailed the circumstances of the case, recalling that investigators arrived unannounced at Brogan's home, already having secured evidence that he had received illicit cash payments. They asked him if he had received the illicit payments he had received, and Brogan replied, "No." The investigators then concluded the interview, stating that they knew he was lying and that his lie was a crime. In other words, the interview had not served to gather information but simply to coerce Brogan into committing an additional crime.

== Dissenting opinion ==
Justice Stevens, joined by Justice Breyer, followed the reasoning given by Justice Ginsburg but argued that logic gives the court the right and the means to exempt the application of Section 1001 from cases involving an "exculpatory no." They showed a willingness to go against the literal meaning of the law, as enacted by the legislature, in the interest of sustaining the spirit of the law.

== See also ==
- Textualism
