= National Industrial Recovery Act of 1933 =

US labor law and consumer law

National Industrial Recovery Act
- Long title: An Act to encourage national industrial recovery, to foster fair competition, and to provide for the construction of certain useful public works and for other purposes.
- Acronyms (colloquial): NIRA
- Enacted by: the 73rd United States Congress
- Effective: June 16, 1933

Citations
- Public law: Pub. L. 73–67
- Statutes at Large: 48 Stat. 195

Legislative history
- Introduced in the House as H.R. 5755 by Robert L. Doughton (D–NC) on May 17, 1933; Committee consideration by Ways and Means, Senate Finance; Passed the House on May 26, 1933 (329-80); Passed the Senate on June 9, 1933 (61-26); Reported by the joint conference committee on June 10, 1933; agreed to by the House on June 10, 1933 (approved) and by the Senate on June 13, 1933 (48-42); Signed into law by President Franklin D. Roosevelt on June 16, 1933

United States Supreme Court cases
- Panama Refining Co. v. Ryan (1935); Schechter Poultry Corp. v. United States (1935)

The National Industrial Recovery Act of 1933 (NIRA) was a US labor law and consumer law passed by the 73rd US Congress to authorize the president to regulate industry for fair wages and prices that would stimulate economic recovery. It also established a national public works program known as the Public Works Administration (PWA). The National Recovery Administration (NRA) portion was widely hailed in 1933, but by 1934 business opinion of the act had soured.

The legislation was enacted in June 1933 during the Great Depression as part of President Franklin D. Roosevelt's New Deal legislative program. Section 7(a) of the bill, which protected collective bargaining rights for unions, proved contentious (especially in the Senate). Congress eventually enacted the legislation and President Roosevelt signed the bill into law on June 16, 1933. The Act had two main titles (sections). Title I was devoted to industrial recovery, authorizing the promulgation of industrial codes of fair competition, guaranteed trade union rights, permitted the regulation of working standards, and regulated the price of certain refined petroleum products and their transportation. Title II established the Public Works Administration, outlined the projects and funding opportunities it could engage in. Title II also provided funding for the Act.

The act was implemented by the NRA and the PWA. Large numbers of regulations were generated under the authority granted to the NRA by the Act, which led to a significant loss of business support for the legislation. NIRA was set to expire in June 1935, but in a major constitutional ruling the Supreme Court held Title I of the Act unconstitutional on May 27, 1935, in Schechter Poultry Corp. v. United States.

The National Industrial Recovery Act is widely considered a policy failure, both in the 1930s and by historians today. Disputes over the reasons for this failure continue. Among the suggested causes are that the act promoted economically harmful monopolies, lacked critical support from the business community, and that it was poorly administered. The NIRA had no mechanisms for handling these problems, which led Congress to pass the National Labor Relations Act in 1935. The act was also a major force behind a major modification of the law criminalizing making false statements.

== Background ==
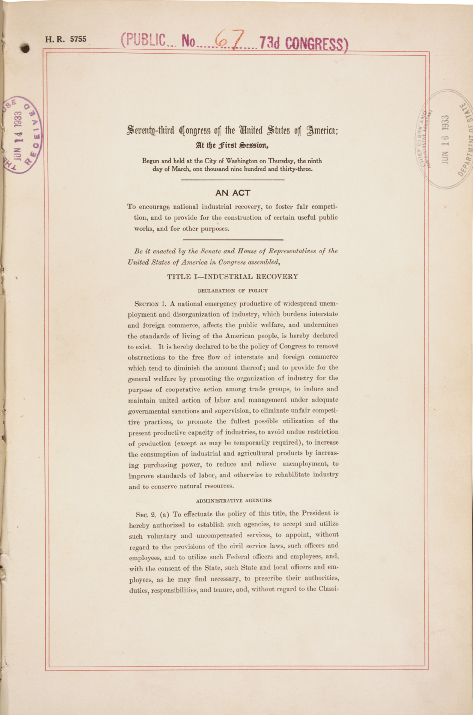
Front page of the National Industrial Recovery Act, as signed by President Franklin D. Roosevelt on June 16, 1933

The Depression began in the United States in October 1929 and grew steadily worse to its nadir in early 1933. President Herbert Hoover feared that too much intervention or coercion by the government would destroy individuality and self-reliance, which he considered to be important American values. His laissez-faire views appeared to be shared by the Secretary of the Treasury Andrew W. Mellon. To combat the growing economic decline, Hoover organized a number of voluntary measures with businesses, encouraged state and local government responses, and accelerated federal building projects. However, his policies had little or no effect on economic recovery. Toward the end of his term, however, Hoover supported several legislative solutions which he felt might lift the country out of the depression. The final attempt of the Hoover administration to rescue the economy was the passage of the Emergency Relief and Construction Act (which provided funds for public works programs) and the Reconstruction Finance Corporation (RFC) (which provided low-interest loans to businesses).

Hoover was defeated for re-election by Roosevelt in the 1932 presidential election. Roosevelt was convinced that federal activism was needed to reverse the country's economic decline. In his first hundred days in office, the Congress enacted at Roosevelt's request a series of bills designed to strengthen the banking system, including the Emergency Banking Act, the Glass–Steagall Act (which created the Federal Deposit Insurance Corporation), and the 1933 Banking Act. The Congress also passed the Agricultural Adjustment Act to stabilize the nation's agricultural industry.

=== Enactment ===
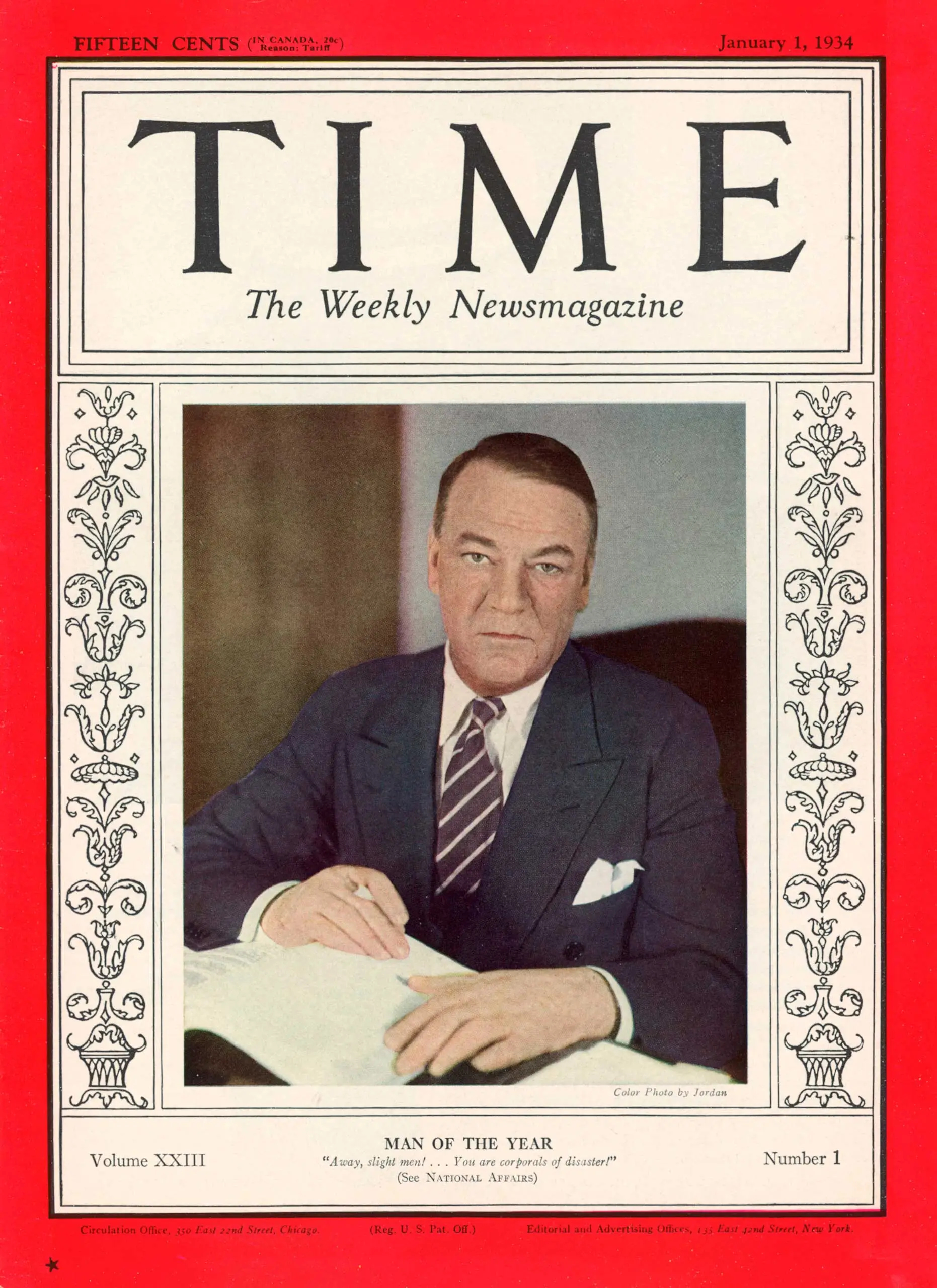
Hugh S. Johnson, one of the primary authors of NIRA, was Time magazine's Man of the Year for 1933.

Enactment of the National Industrial Recovery Act climaxed the first 100 days of Roosevelt's presidency. Hugh S. Johnson, Raymond Moley, Donald Richberg, Rexford Tugwell, Jerome Frank, and Bernard Baruch—key Roosevelt advisors—believed that unrestrained competition had helped cause the Great Depression and that government had a critical role to play through national planning, limited regulation, the fostering of trade associations, support for "fair" trade practices, and support for "democratization of the workplace" (a standard work week, shorter working hours, and better working conditions). Roosevelt, himself the former head of a trade association, believed that government promotion of "self-organization" by trade associations was the least-intrusive and yet most effective method for achieving national planning and economic improvement.

Some work on an industrial relief bill had been done in the weeks following Roosevelt's election, but much of this was in the nature of talk and the exchange of ideas rather than legislative research and drafting. The administration, preoccupied with banking and agriculture legislation, did not begin working on industrial relief legislation until early April. Congress, however, was moving on its own industrial legislation. In the Senate, Robert F. Wagner, Edward P. Costigan, and Robert M. La Follette, Jr. were promoting public works legislation, and Hugo Black was pushing short-work-week legislation. Motivated to work on his own industrial relief bill by these efforts, Roosevelt ordered Moley to work with these Senators (and anyone else in government who seemed interested) to craft a bill. Overburdened, Moley delegated this work to Hugh S. Johnson.

By May 1933, two draft bills had emerged, a cautious and legalistic one by John Dickinson (Under Secretary of Commerce) and an ambitious one focusing on trade associations by Hugh Johnson. Many leading businessmen—including Gerard Swope (head of General Electric), Charles M. Schwab (chairman of Bethlehem Steel Corporation), E. H. Harriman (chairman of the Union Pacific Railroad), and Henry I. Harriman, president of the U.S. Chamber of Commerce—helped draft the legislation. A two-part bill, the first section promoting cooperative action among business to achieve fair competition and provide for national planning and a second section establishing a national public works program, was submitted to Congress on May 15, 1933.

The House of Representatives easily passed the bill in just seven days. The most contentious issue was the inclusion of Title 1, Section 7(a), which protected collective bargaining rights for unions. Section 7(a) was nearly eliminated from the bill, but Senator Wagner, Jerome Frank, and Leon Keyserling (another Roosevelt aide) worked to retain the section in order to win the support of the American labor movement. According to one study

... The capitalist’s opposition to section 7a in congressional hearings was not convincing enough to persuade an overwhelmingly urban liberal Democratic Congress. As Kenneth Finegold and Theda Skocpol have correctly pointed out, congressional Democrats were eager to consolidate their electoral majorities by supporting and enacting prolabor legislation. With the urban industrial working class becoming a major electoral bloc for urban Democrats, it is not surprising that pressures from industrial workers, both employed and unemployed, played a major role not only in moving congressional Democrats to favour prolabor legislation but also in moving the Democratic party itself left of center.”

The bill had a more difficult time in the Senate. The National Association of Manufacturers and Chamber of Commerce opposed its passage due to the labor provision. Despite the positions of these two important trade associations, most businesses initially supported the NIRA. Senator Bennett Champ Clark introduced an amendment to weaken Section 7(a), but Wagner and Senator George W. Norris led the successful opposition to the change. The bulk of the Senate debate, however, turned on the bill's suspension of antitrust law. Senators William E. Borah, Burton K. Wheeler, and Hugo Black opposed any relaxation of the Sherman Antitrust Act, arguing that this would exacerbate existing severe economic inequality and concentrate wealth in the hands of the rich (a severe problem which many economists at the time believed was one of the causes of the Great Depression). Wagner defended the bill, arguing that the bill's promotion of codes of fair trade practices would help create progressive standards for wages, hours, and working conditions, and eliminate sweatshops and child labor. The Senate passed the amended legislation 57-to-24 on June 9.

A House–Senate conference committee met throughout the evening of June 9 and all day June 10 to reconcile the two versions of the bill, approving a final version on the afternoon of June 10. The House approved the conference committee's bill on the evening of June 10. After extensive debate, the Senate approved the final bill, 46-to-39, on June 13. President Roosevelt signed the bill into law on June 16, 1933.

== Structure of the Act ==
The National Industrial Recovery Act had two major titles (sections).

Title I was devoted to industrial recovery. Title I, Section 2 empowered the President to establish executive branch agencies to carry out the purposes of the Act, and provided for a sunset provision nullifying the Act in two years. The heart of the Act was Title I, Section 3, which permitted trade or industrial associations to seek presidential approval of codes of fair competition (so long as such codes did not promote monopolies or provide unfair competition against small businesses) and provided for enforcement of these codes. Title I, Section 5 exempted the codes from the federal antitrust laws.

Title I, Section 7(a) guaranteed the right of workers to form unions and banned yellow-dog contracts:

... employees shall have the right to organize and bargain collectively through representatives of their own choosing, and shall be free from the interference restraint, or coercion of employers of labor, or their agents, in the designation of such representatives or in self-organization or in other concerted activities for the purpose of collective bargaining or other mutual aid or protection; [and] (2) that no employee and no one seeking employment shall be required as a condition of employment to join any company union or to refrain from joining, organizing, or assisting a labor organization of his own choosing... .

Title I, Section 7(b) permitted the establishment of standards regarding maximum hours of labor, minimum rates of pay, and working conditions in the industries covered by the codes, while Section 7(c) authorized the President to impose such standards on codes when voluntary agreement could not be reached. Title I, Section 9 authorized the regulation of oil pipelines and prices for the transportation of all petroleum products by pipeline. Section 9(b) permitted the executive to take over any oil pipeline company, subsidiary, or business if the parent company was found in violation of the Act.

Title II established the Public Works Administration. Title II, Section 201 established the agency and provided for a two-year sunset provision. Section 202 outlines the types of public works which the new agency may seek to fund or build. Title II, Section 203 authorized the Public Works Administration to provide grants and/or loans to states and localities in order to more rapidly reduce unemployment as well as to use the power of eminent domain to seize land or materials to engage in public works. Title II, Section 204 explicitly provided $400 million for the construction of public highways, bridges, roads, railroad crossings, paths, and other transportation projects.

Title II, Section 208 authorized the president to expend up to $25 million to purchase farms for the purpose of relocating individuals living in overcrowded urban areas (such as cities) to these farms and allowing them to raise crops and earn a living there.

Title II, Sections 210–219 provided for revenues to fund the Act, and Section 220 appropriated money for the Act's implementation.

Title III of the Act contained miscellaneous provisions, and transferred the authority to engage in public works from the Reconstruction Finance Corporation to the Public Works Administration.

== Implementation ==
Implementation of the act began immediately, with the NRA and PWA the leading agencies. Hugh Johnson spent most of May and June planning for implementation, and the National Recovery Administration (NRA) was established on June 20, 1933—a scant four days after the law's enactment. Roosevelt angered Johnson by having him administer only the NRA, while the Public Works Administration (PWA) went to Harold L. Ickes. NRA and PWA reported to different cabinet agencies, making coordination difficult, and PWA money flowed so slowly into the economy that NRA proved to be the more important agency by far.

=== National Recovery Administration ===
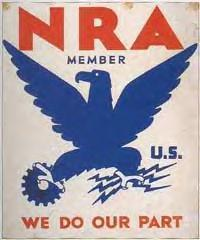
NRA Blue Eagle poster, the image most commonly associated with the NIRA

NIRA, as implemented by the NRA, became notorious for generating large numbers of regulations. By March 1934 the "NRA was engaged chiefly in drawing up these industrial codes for all industries to adopt." The agency approved 557 basic and 189 supplemental industry codes in two years. Between 4,000 and 5,000 business practices were prohibited, some 3,000 administrative orders running to over 10,000 pages promulgated, and thousands of opinions and guides from national, regional, and local code boards interpreted and enforced the Act.

The premiere symbol of the NIRA was the Blue Eagle.

By the end of 1934, large and small business owners and most of the public had turned against the NRA. Roosevelt himself shifted his views on the best way to achieve economic recovery, and began a new legislative program (known as the "Second New Deal") in 1935.

=== Labor organizing provision ===
Implementation of Section 7(a) of the NIRA proved immensely problematic as well. The protections of the Act led to a massive wave of union organizing punctuated by employer and union violence, general strikes, and recognition strikes. At the outset, NRA Administrator Hugh Johnson naïvely believed that Section 7(a) would be self-enforcing, but he quickly learned otherwise. On August 5, 1933, the National Labor Board was established under the auspices of the NRA to implement the collective bargaining provisions of the Act. The National Labor Board, too, proved to be ineffective, and on July 5, 1935, a new law—the National Labor Relations Act—superseded the NIRA and established a new, long-lasting federal labor policy.

=== Public Works Administration ===
NIRA also created a Public Works Administration (not to be confused with the Works Progress Administration (WPA) of 1935).

The leadership of the Public Works Authority was torn over the new agency's mission. PWA could initiate its own construction projects, distribute money to other federal agencies to fund their construction projects, or make loans to states and localities to fund their construction projects. But many in the Roosevelt administration felt PWA should not spend money, for fear of worsening the federal deficit, and so funds flowed slowly. Furthermore, the very nature of construction (planning, specifications, and blueprints) also held up the disbursement of money. Harold Ickes, too, was determined to ensure that graft and corruption did not tarnish the agency's reputation and lead to loss of political support in Congress, and so moved cautiously in spending the agency's money. Although the U.S. Supreme Court would rule Title I of NIRA unconstitutional, the severability clause in the Act enabled the PWA to survive. Among the projects it funded between 1935 and 1939 are: the USS Yorktown; USS Enterprise; the 30th Street railroad station in Philadelphia, Pennsylvania; the Triborough Bridge; the port of Brownsville; Grand Coulee Dam; Boulder Dam; Fort Peck Dam; Bonneville Dam; and the Overseas Highway connecting Key West, Florida, with the mainland. The agency survived until 1943, when the Reorganization Act of 1939 consolidated most federal public works and work relief functions of the federal government into the new Federal Works Agency.

=== Proposed reauthorization ===
President Roosevelt sought an extension of NIRA on February 20, 1935. But the business backlash against the New Deal, coupled with continuing congressional concern over the Act's suspension of antitrust law, left the President's request politically dead. A U.S. Senate committee investigation into the effectiveness of the NRA, PWA, and Section 7(a) revealed only limited political support for the law among Senators. The Senate bill reauthorizing NIRA provided for only a 10-month extension, with significant new limitations on NRA powers. The House reauthorization bill contained no new limits on the NRA, and proposed a two-year extension. By May 1935, the issue was moot as the U.S. Supreme Court had ruled Title I of NIRA unconstitutional.

== Legal challenge and nullification ==
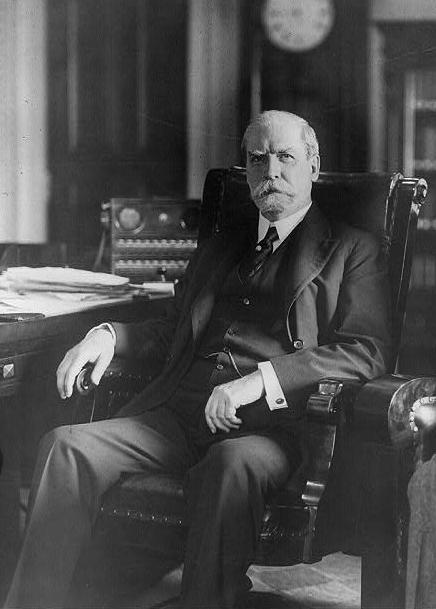
Chief Justice of the U.S. Charles Evans Hughes

On April 13, 1934, the President had approved the "Code of Fair Competition for the Live Poultry Industry of the Metropolitan Area in and about the City of New York." The goal of the code was to ensure that live poultry (provided to kosher slaughterhouses for butchering and sale to observant Jews) were fit for human consumption and to prevent the submission of false sales and price reports. The industry was almost entirely centered on New York City. Under the new poultry code, the Schechter brothers were indicted on 60 counts (of which 27 were dismissed by the trial court), acquitted on 14, and convicted in 19. One of the counts on which they were convicted was for selling a diseased bird, leading Hugh Johnson to jokingly call the suit the "sick chicken case".

Even before these legal aspects became widely known, a number of court challenges to the NIRA were winding their way through the courts. The constitutionality of the NIRA was tested in Schechter Poultry Corp. v. United States, 295 U.S. 495 (1935). Courts identified three problems with the NIRA: "(i) was the subject matter sought to be regulated by the power of Congress; (ii) if the regulations violated the Fifth Amendment to the United States Constitution; and (iii) had Congress properly delegated its power to the executive."

Although Roosevelt, most of his aides, Johnson, and the NIRA staff felt the Act would survive a court test, the U.S. Department of Justice had on March 25, 1935, declined to appeal an appellate court ruling overturning the lumber industry code on the grounds that the case was not a good test of the NIRA's constitutionality. The Justice Department's action worried many in the administration. But on April 1, 1935, the Second Circuit Court of Appeals upheld the constitutionality of the NIRA in the Schechter case. Although Donald Richberg and others felt the government's case in Schechter was not a strong one, the Schechters were determined to appeal their conviction. So the government appealed first, and the Supreme Court heard oral argument on May 2 and 3.

On May 27, 1935, Chief Justice Charles Evans Hughes wrote for a unanimous Court in Schechter Poultry Corp. v. The United States that Title I of the National Industrial Recovery Act was unconstitutional. First, Hughes concluded that the law was void for vagueness because of the critical term "fair competition" (Note: The National Industrial Recovery Act, Ch. 90, 48 Stat. 195, Title I, Sec. 3(a) reads: "Upon the application to the President by one or more trade or industrial associations or groups, the President may approve a code or codes of fair competition for the trade or industry or subdivision thereof...") was nowhere defined in the Act. Second, Hughes found the Act's delegation of authority to the executive branch unconstitutionally overbroad:

To summarize and conclude upon this point: Section 3 of the Recovery Act (15 USCA 703) is without precedent. It supplies no standards for any trade, industry, or activity. It does not undertake to prescribe rules of conduct to be applied to particular states of fact determined by appropriate administrative procedure. Instead of prescribing rules of conduct, it authorizes the making of codes to prescribe them. For that legislative undertaking, section 3 sets up no standards, aside from the statement of the general aims of rehabilitation, correction, and expansion described in section 1. In view of the scope of that broad declaration and of the nature of the few restrictions that are imposed, the discretion of the President in approving or prescribing codes, and thus enacting laws for the government of trade and industry throughout the country, is virtually unfettered. We think that the code-making authority thus conferred is an unconstitutional delegation of legislative power.

Finally, in a very restrictive reading of what constituted interstate commerce, Hughes held that the "'current' or 'flow'" of commerce involved was simply too minute to constitute interstate commerce, and subsequently Congress had no power under the Commerce Clause to enact legislation affecting such commercial transactions. The Court dismissed with a bare paragraph the government's ability to regulate wages and hours. Although the government had argued that the national economic emergency required special consideration, Hughes disagreed. The dire economic circumstances the country faced did not justify the overly broad delegation or overreach of the Act, the majority concluded. "Extraordinary conditions may call for extraordinary remedies. But the argument necessarily stops short of an attempt to justify action which lies outside the sphere of constitutional authority. Extraordinary conditions do not create or enlarge constitutional power."

Although the decision emasculated NIRA, it had little practical impact, as Congress was unlikely to have reauthorized the Act in any case. (Note: As of 2007, Schechter Poultry and Panama Refining Co. v. Ryan, 293 U.S. 388 (1935), are the only cases in which the Supreme Court has struck down an act of Congress for overbroad delegation of legislative authority. See: Ross, The Chief Justiceship of Charles Evans Hughes, 1930–1941, 2007.)

== Criticism ==
At the time and in recent analyzes, NIRA is generally considered to be a failure.

A key criticism of the Act at the time as well as more recently is that the NIRA endorsed monopolies, with the attendant economic problems associated with that type of market failure. Even the National Recovery Review Board, established by President Roosevelt in March 1934 to review the performance of the NIRA, concluded that the Act hindered economic growth by promoting cartels and monopolies. (Note: This was not, however, unexpected: Senator Gerald Nye, an ardent opponent of monopolies, named five of the board's six members, and long-time antitrust advocate Clarence Darrow led the Board.) One of the economic effects of monopoly and cartels is higher prices—this was seen as necessary because the severe deflation of 1929–33 had depressed prices 20% and more. There is anecdotal evidence that these higher prices led to some stability in industry, but a number of scholars maintain that these prices were so high that economic recovery was inhibited. But other economists disagree, pointing to far more important monetary, budgetary, and tax policies as contributors to the continuation of the Great Depression. Others point out that the cartels created by the Act were inherently unstable (as all cartels are), and that the effect on prices was minimal because the codes collapsed so quickly.

A second key criticism of the Act is that it lacked support from the business community, and thus was doomed to failure. Business support for national planning and government intervention was very strong in 1933, but had collapsed by mid-1934. Many studies conclude, however, that business support for NIRA was never uniform. Larger, older businesses embraced the legislation while smaller, newer ones (more nimble in a highly competitive market and with less capital investment to lose if they failed) did not. This is a classic problem of cartels, and thus NIRA codes failed as small business abandoned the cartels. Studies of the steel, automobile manufacturing, lumber, textile, and rubber industries and the level and source of support for the NIRA tend to support this conclusion. Without the support of industry, the Act could never have performed as it was intended.

A third major criticism of the Act is that it was poorly administered. The Act purposefully brought together competing interests (labor and business, big business and small business, etc.) in a coalition to support passage of the legislation, but these competing interests soon fought one another over the Act's implementation. As a consequence, NIRA collapsed due to failure of leadership and confusion about its goals. By the end of 1934, NIRA leaders had practically abandoned the progressive interventionist policy which motivated the Act's passage, and were supporting free-market philosophies—contributing to the collapse of almost all industry codes.

There are a wide range of additional critiques as well. One is that NIRA's industry codes interfered with capital markets, inhibiting economic recovery. But more recent analyzes conclude that NIRA had little effect on capital markets one way or the other. Another is that political uncertainty created by the NIRA caused a drop in business confidence, inhibiting recovery. But at least one study has shown no effect whatsoever.

Section 7(a) led to significant increases in union organizing, but NRA administrative rulings effectively gutted this section by permitting company union. Although Section 7(a) was not affected by the Supreme Court's decision in Schechter Poultry, the failure of the section led directly to passage of the National Labor Relations Act in July 1935.

Historian Alan Brinkley stated that by 1935 the NIRA was a "woeful failure, even a political embarrassment." Many liberals, probably including Roosevelt, were quietly relieved by its demise. However, New Dealers were worried by the Supreme Court's strict interpretation of the interstate commerce clause and worried that other legislation was jeopardized.

== Legacy ==
In 1934, at the request of the Secretary Ickes, who wished to use the statute criminalizing making false statements to enforce Section 9(c) of the NIRA against producers of "hot oil", oil produced in violation of production restrictions established pursuant to the NIRA, Congress passed Pub. L. 73–394, 48 Stat. 996, enacted June 18, 1934, which amended the False Claims Act of 1863 to read:

... or whoever~~, for the purpose of obtaining or aiding to obtain the payment or approval of such claim, or for the purpose and with the intent of cheating and swindling or defrauding the Government of the United States, or any department thereof, or any corporation in which the United States of America is a stockholder,~~ shall knowingly and willfully falsify or conceal or cover up by any trick, scheme, or device a material fact, or make or cause to be made any false or fraudulent statements or representations, or make or use or cause to be made or used any false bill, receipt, voucher, roll, account, claim, certificate, affidavit, or deposition, knowing the same to contain any fraudulent or fictitious statement or entry, in any matter within the jurisdiction of any department or agency of the United States or of any corporation in which the United States of America is a stockholder ...

This form of the statute, in slightly modified form, still exists today at 18 U.S.C. § 1001.

== See also ==
- Wagner–Peyser Act of 1933

== Bibliography ==
- Anderson, William L. (April 2000). "Risk and the National Industrial Recovery Act: An Empirical Evaluation". Public Choice. 103 (1–2): 139–161. doi:10.1023/A:1005054019819. S2CID 152916565.
- Barber, William J. (1989). From New Era to New Deal: Herbert Hoover, the Economists, and American Economic Policy, 1921–1933. New York: Cambridge University Press. ISBN 978-0-521-36737-0.
- Barnett, Randy E.; Blackman, Josh (2021). Constitutional Law: Cases in Context. New York: Wolters Kluwer. ISBN 978-1-5438-3878-7.
- Bellush, Bernard (1975). The Failure of the NRA. New York: W.W. Norton. ISBN 978-0-393-05548-1.
- Bernanke, Ben; Parkinson, Martin (May 1989). "Unemployment, Inflation and Wages in the American Depression: Are There Lessons for Europe?". American Economic Review. 79 (2): 210–214. doi:10.3386/w2862.
- Bernstein, Irving (2010) [1969]. The Turbulent Years: A History of the American Worker, 1933–1941. Chicago: Haymarket Books. ISBN 978-1-60846-064-9.
- Bernstein, Michael (1987). The Great Depression: Delayed Recovery and Economic Change in America, 1929–1939. New York: Cambridge University Press. ISBN 978-0-521-37985-4.
- Best, Gary Dean (1991). Pride, Prejudice, and Politics: Roosevelt Versus Recovery, 1933–1938. New York: Praeger Publishers. ISBN 978-0-275-93524-5.
- Biles, Roger (1991). A New Deal for the American People. DeKalb, Ill.: Northern Illinois University Press. ISBN 978-0-87580-161-2.
- Brand, Donald Robert (1988). Corporatism and the Rule of Law: A Study of the National Recovery Administration. Ithaca, N.Y.: Cornell University Press. ISBN 978-0-8014-2169-3.
- Brinkley, Alan (1995). The End of Reform: New Deal Liberalism in Recession and War. New York: Vintage Books. ISBN 978-0-679-75314-8.
- Collins, Robert M. (Autumn 1978). "Positive Business Responses to the New Deal: The Roots of the Committee for Economic Development, 1933–1942". Business History Review. 52 (3): 369–391. doi:10.2307/3113736. JSTOR 3113736. S2CID 146238143.
- Daugherty, Carroll R.; de Chazeau, Melvin G.; Stratton, Samuel S. (1937). The Economics of the Iron and Steel Industry. Pittsburgh: Bureau of Business Research, University of Pittsburgh. OCLC 503553.
- Delton, Jennifer (2020). The Industrialists: Now the National Association of Manufacturers Shaped American Capitalism. Princeton, N.J.: Princeton University Press. ISBN 978-0-691-16786-2.
- Dorich, Thomas J. (2021). Big Business in America: The Corporate Century, 1900-2000. Lanham, Md.: Lexington Books. ISBN 978-1-4985-9597-1.
- Dubofsky, Melvyn; Dulles, Foster Rhea (2010). Labor in America: A History. Hoboken, N.J.: John Wiley & Sons. ISBN 978-0-88295-273-4.
- Eisner, Marc Allen (2000). Regulatory Politics in Transition. Baltimore: The Johns Hopkins University Press. ISBN 978-0-8018-6492-6.
- Farrell, Chris (2004). Deflation: What Happens When Prices Fall. New York: HarperCollins. ISBN 978-0-06-057645-5.
- Fine, Sidney (1963). Automobile Under the Blue Eagle: Labor, Management, and the Automobile Manufacturing Code. Ann Arbor, Mich.: University of Michigan Press. OCLC 999975.
- Fisher, Irving (October 1933). "The Debt-Deflation Theory of Great Depressions" (PDF). Econometrica. 1 (4): 337–357. doi:10.2307/1907327. JSTOR 1907327.
- Friedman, Milton; Schwartz, Anna J. (1963). A Monetary History of the United States, 1867–1960. Princeton, N.J.: Princeton University Press. ISBN 978-1-4008-2933-0. OCLC 1331033779.
- Galambos, Louis (1966). Competition and Cooperation: The Emergence of a National Trade Association. Baltimore: The Johns Hopkins University Press. OCLC 237577.
- Galbraith, John Kenneth (1997) [1954]. The Great Crash of 1929. Boston: Houghton Mifflin & Co. ISBN 978-0-395-85999-5.
- Geisst, Charles R. (2006). Encyclopedia of American Business History. New York: Facts On File. ISBN 978-0-8160-4350-7.
- Gross, James A. (1974). The Making of the National Labor Relations Board: A Study in Economics, Politics, and the Law. Albany, N.Y.: State University of New York Press Press. ISBN 978-0-87395-270-5.
- Hall, Thomas E.; Ferguson, David (1998). The Great Depression: An International Disaster of Perverse Economic Policies. Ann Arbor, Mich.: University of Michigan Press. ISBN 978-0-472-09667-1.
- Harrington, Joseph E. Jr.; Chen, Joe (November 2006). "Cartel Pricing Dynamics With Cost Variability and Endogenous Buyer Detection". International Journal of Industrial Organization. 24 (6): 1185–1212. doi:10.1016/j.ijindorg.2006.04.012. Archived from the original on July 20, 2018.
- Hawley, Ellis (1966). The New Deal and the Problem of Monopoly. Princeton, N.J.: Princeton University Press. ISBN 978-1-4008-7531-3.
- Hayes, Douglas A. (1951). Business Confidence and Business Activity: A Case Study of the Recession of 1937. Ann Arbor, Mich.: University of Michigan Press. OCLC 3700753.
- Horwitz, Robert Britt (1989). The Irony of Regulatory Reform: The Deregulation of American Telecommunications. New York: Oxford University Press. ISBN 978-0-19-505445-3.
- Houck, David W. (2001). Rhetoric As Currency: Hoover, Roosevelt, and the Great Depression. College Station, Tx.: Texas A&M University Press. ISBN 978-1-58544-109-9.
- James, Lee M. (October 1946). "Restrictive Agreements and Practices in the Lumber Industry, 1880–1939". Southern Economic Journal. 13 (2): 115–125. doi:10.2307/1052520. JSTOR 1052520.
- Kemp, Emory L. (2000). The Great Kanawha Navigation. Pittsburgh: University of Pittsburgh Press. ISBN 978-0-8229-4112-5.
- Kennedy, David M. (2005). Freedom from Fear: The American People in Depression and War, 1929–1945. New York: Oxford University Press. ISBN 978-0-19-514403-1.
- Kennedy, Edward Donald (1941). The Automobile Industry: The Coming of Age of Capitalism's Favorite Child. New York: Reynal and Hitchcock. OCLC 3247284.
- Krepps, Matthew B. (February 1997). "Another Look at the Impact of the National Industrial Recovery Act on Cartel Formation and Maintenance Costs". Review of Economics and Statistics. 79 (1): 151–154. doi:10.1162/003465397556502. S2CID 57568487.
- Krepps, Matthew B. (August 1999). "Facilitating Practices and the Path-Dependence of Collusion". International Journal of Industrial Organization. 17 (6): 887–901. doi:10.1016/S0167-7187(97)00066-0.
- Lande, Robert H.; Connor, John M (December 2005). "How High Do Cartels Raise Prices? Implications for Reform of the Antitrust Sentencing Guidelines". Tulane Law Review. 80 (2): 513–570. doi:10.2139/ssrn.787907. S2CID 155973465.
- Levine, Rhonda F. (1988). Class Struggle and the New Deal: Industrial Labor, Industrial Capital and the State. Lawrence, Kan.: University Press of Kansas. ISBN 978-0-7006-0373-2.
- Lyon, Leverett S.; Homan, Paul T.; George, Terborgh; Lorwin, Lewis L.; Dearing, Charles L.; Marshall, Leon C. (1935). The National Recovery Administration: An Analysis and Appraisal. Washington, D.C.: The Brookings Institution. OCLC 1050549832.
- Mayer, Thomas; Chatterji, Monojit (December 1985). "Political Shocks and Investment: Some Evidence from the 1930s". Journal of Economic History. 45 (4): 913=924. doi:10.1017/S0022050700035166. S2CID 155005461.
- McKenna, Marian C. (2002). Franklin Roosevelt and the Great Constitutional War: The Court-Packing Crisis of 1937. New York: Fordham University Press. ISBN 978-0-8232-2154-7.
- Morris, Charles (2004). The Blue Eagle At Work: Reclaiming Democratic Rights In The American Workplace. Ithaca, N.Y.: ILR Press. ISBN 978-0-8014-4317-6.
- Olson, James Stuart (2001). Historical Dictionary of the Great Depression, 1929–1940. Westport, Conn.: Greenwood Press. ISBN 978-0-313-30618-1.
- Pennock, Pamela (Winter 1997). "The National Recovery Administration and the Rubber Tire Industry, 1933–1935". Business History Review. 71 (4): 543–568. doi:10.2307/3116306. JSTOR 3116306. S2CID 154346794.
- Perloff, Jeffrey M.; Karp, Larry S.; Golan, Amos (2007). Estimating Market Power and Strategies. New York: Cambridge University Press. ISBN 978-0-521-01114-3.
- Rae, John B. (1959). American Automobile Manufacturers: The First Forty Years. Philadelphia: Chilton Book. OCLC 1004807020.
- Rayback, Joseph G. (1974). A History of American Labor. New York: Macmillan. ISBN 978-1-4391-1899-3. OCLC 615514713.
- Roose, Kenneth D. (1954). The Economics of Recession and Revival. New Haven, Conn.: Yale University Press. OCLC 252427283.
- Ross, William G. (2007). The Chief Justiceship of Charles Evans Hughes, 1930–1941. Columbia, S.C.: University of South Carolina Press. ISBN 978-1-57003-679-8.
- Schlesinger, Arthur M. Jr. (2003). The Age of Roosevelt. Vol. 1: Crisis of the Old Order. Boston: Houghton Mifflin. ISBN 978-0-618-34085-9.
- Schlesinger, Arthur M. Jr. (2003). The Age of Roosevelt. Vol. 2: The Coming of the New Deal. Boston: Houghton Mifflin. ISBN 978-0-618-34086-6.
- Schlesinger, Arthur M. Jr. (2003). The Age of Roosevelt. Vol. 3: The Politics of Upheaval, 1935–1936. Boston: Houghton Mifflin. ISBN 978-0-547-52425-2.
- Shaffer, Butler D. (1997). In Restraint of Trade: The Business Campaign Against Competition, 1918–1938. Lewisburg, Pa.: Bucknell University Press. ISBN 978-0-8387-5325-5.
- Skocpol, Theda (1994). "Political Response to Capitalist Crisis: Neo-Marxist Theories of the State and the Case of the New Deal". In Scott, John (ed.). Power: Critical Concepts. Volume 3. New York: Routledge. ISBN 978-0-415-07937-2.
- Smith, Gene (1970). The Shattered Dream: Herbert Hoover and the Great Depression. New York: Willam Morrow and Co. OCLC 76078.
- Sobel, Robert (1975). Herbert Hoover at the Onset of the Great Depression, 1929–1930. New York: Lippincott. ISBN 978-0-397-47334-2.
- "Some Legal Aspects of the National Industrial Recovery Act". Harvard Law Review. 47 (1): 85–125. November 1933. doi:10.2307/1332107. JSTOR 1332107.
- Stabile, Donald R.; Kozak, Andrew R. (2012). Markets, Planning and the Moral Economy: Business Cycles in the Progressive Era and New Deal. Northampton, Mass.: Edward Elgar Publishing. ISBN 978-1-78100-676-4.
- Sternsher, Bernard (1964). Rexford Tugwell and the New Deal. New Brunswick, N.J.: Rutgers University Press. OCLC 466310.
- Stewart, Maxwell S. (1937). Steel—Problems of a Great Industry. New York: Public Affairs Committee. OCLC 3716534.
- Taylor, Jason E. (2019). Deconstructing the Monolith: The Microeconomics of the National Industrial Recovery Act. Chicago: The University of Chicago Press. ISBN 978-0-226-60330-8.
- Tomlins, Christopher L. (1985). The State and the Unions: Labor Relations, Law, and the Organized Labor Movement in America, 1880–1960. New York: Cambridge University Press. ISBN 978-0-521-31452-7.
- Vadney, Thomas E. (1970). The Wayward Liberal: A Political Biography of Donald Richberg. Lexington, Ky.: The University Press of Kentucky. ISBN 978-0-8131-1243-5.
- Venn, Fiona (1999). The New Deal. New York: Taylor & Francis. ISBN 978-1-315-06253-2.
- Vittoz, Stanley (1987). New Deal Labor Policy and the American Industrial Economy. Chapel Hill, N.C.: University of North Carolina Press. ISBN 978-0-8078-1729-2.
- Walton, John (1992). Western Times and Water Wars: State, Culture, and Rebellion in California. Berkeley, Calif.: University of California Press. ISBN 978-0-520-07245-9.
- Watkins, T.H. (2000). The Hungry Hears: A Narrative History of the Great Depression in America. New York: Henry Holt & Co. ISBN 978-0-8050-6506-0.
- Weinstein, Michael (1980). Recovery and Redistribution Under the NIRA. New York: North-Holland Publishing. ISBN 978-0-444-86007-1.
