= Oil (disambiguation) =

Oil is any of a number of nonpolar, hydrophobic, and viscous liquids.

Oil also often refers to:

- Cooking oil, any liquid fat used in food preparation
- Lubricant, a substance that reduces friction between surfaces
  - Lubrication, using a lubricant to reduce friction
  - Motor oil, any lubricant used in internal combustion engines
- Petroleum (crude oil), naturally occurring liquid found beneath the Earth's surface, or a derived product:
  - Fuel oil, liquid fuel burned for heat or power
  - Heating oil, liquid fuel

Oil or OIL may also refer to:

== Arts, entertainment, and media ==
=== Art ===
- Oil paint, paint with pigments suspended in an oil
- Oil painting, the process of using paints based on oils

=== Music ===
- Oil (band), a group of Californian heavy metal musicians
- OiL, a band from Pennsylvania now called CKY
- Oil: Chicago Punk Refined, a compilation CD released by Thick Records
- Midnight Oil, also known as "The Oils", an Australian rock band
- "Oil," a Gorillaz track featuring Stevie Nicks, released on the 2023 album "Cracker Island."

=== Television ===
==== Series ====
- Oil, an early title of the U.S. TV series Blood & Oil
- Oil, the original title of 1980s soap opera Dynasty

==== Episodes ====
- "Oil" (Dynasty), the debut episode of Dynasty
- "Oil" (The Young Ones), a 1982 episode of The Young Ones

=== Other arts, entertainment, and media ===
- Oil (film), a 2009 Italian documentary
- Oil!, a novel by Upton Sinclair published in 1927

== Organizations ==
- Big Oil, a name used to collectively describe major oil corporations
- OIL (incorporations and corporate services), a company
- Office of Infrastructure and Logistics (European Commission) in Luxembourg
- Oklahoma Intercollegiate Legislature, a collegiate political education organization
- Oil India Ltd
- Oil Insurance Limited, a mutual insurance company
- Oilexco (TSX: OIL, LON: OIL), an oil company

== Technology ==
- Ontology Inference Layer or Ontology Interchange Language, an ontology infrastructure for the Semantic Web
- OSEK Implementation Language, a description language used in OSEK systems

== See also ==
- Oil lamp
- Langues d'oïl (in Romance languages)
- OYL (disambiguation)
