= Gundy v. United States =

- Supreme Court of the United States

Argued October 2, 2018 Decided June 20, 2019
- Full case name: Herman Avery Gundy, Petitioner v. United States
- Docket no.: 17-6086
- Citations: 588 U.S. 128 (more) 139 S. Ct. 2116; 204 L. Ed. 2d 522
- Argument: Oral argument

Case history
- Prior: Charge dismissed, United States v. Gundy, 13 Crim. 8 (JPO) (S.D.N.Y. May. 22, 2013); Motion to reconsider denied, United States v. Gundy, 13 Crim. 8 (JPO) (S.D.N.Y. September 11, 2013); Judgement reversed and remanded, United States v. Gundy, 804 F.3d 140 (2d Cir. 2015); Defendant convicted by bench trial, United States v. Gundy, 13 Crim. 8 (JPO) (S.D.N.Y. June 16, 2016); Judgement affirmed, United States v. Gundy, 695 Fed.Appx. 639 (2d Cir. June 22, 2017); Cert. granted (limited to question 4), 583 U.S 1166 (2018)
- Subsequent: Rehearing denied.

Questions presented
- Whether SORNA's delegation of authority to the Attorney General to issue regulations under 42 U.S.C. § 16913(d) violates the nondelegation doctrine.

Holding
- SORNA's delegation of authority to the Attorney General does not violate the nondelegation doctrine. Judgement of the Second Circuit affirmed.

Court membership
- Chief Justice John Roberts Associate Justices Clarence Thomas · Ruth Bader Ginsburg; Stephen Breyer · Samuel Alito; Sonia Sotomayor · Elena Kagan; Neil Gorsuch · Brett Kavanaugh

Case opinions
- Plurality: Kagan, joined by Ginsburg, Breyer, Sotomayor
- Concurrence: Alito (in judgment)
- Dissent: Gorsuch, joined by Roberts, Thomas
- Kavanaugh took no part in the consideration or decision of the case.

Laws applied
- U.S. Const. Art. I, § 1

Gundy v. United States, 588 U.S. 128 (2019), was a United States Supreme Court case which held 42 U.S.C. § 16913(d), part of the Sex Offender Registration and Notification Act ("SORNA"), does not violate the nondelegation doctrine. The section of the SORNA allows the Attorney General to "specify the applicability" of the mandatory registration requirements of "sex offenders convicted before the enactment of [SORNA]". Congress may delegate legislative power to the executive branch, so long as an "intelligible principle" is provided in the statute. The outcome of the case could have greatly influenced the broad delegations of power Congress has made to the federal executive branch, but it did not.

== Background ==
Herman Avery Gundy was on supervised release for a prior federal offense he had committed when he was convicted of sexual assault in Maryland (a state offense), on October 3, 2005. He was sentenced to 20 years imprisonment and 5 years probation, with 10 of the 20-year sentence suspended. Consequently, on March 23, 2006 he was convicted in federal court of violating his supervised release and sentenced to 2 years imprisonment (to be served consecutively to his sexual assault sentence). After he had served his prison sentence for the sexual assault in state custody, on June 15, 2011, he was transferred to federal custody in Pennsylvania to serve his sentence for violating his supervised release.

On July 17, 2012, Gundy received permission to travel unsupervised to a residential reentry center in New York. On August 27, 2012, he was released from federal custody. Gundy did not register as a sex offender in either Maryland (where he committed his crime) or New York (his state of residence), and was thus arrested for violating SORNA (18 U.S.C. § 2250). In January 2013, he was indicted for that offense.

Despite being convicted of a sexual offense before the implementation of SORNA, Gundy was still subject to the law. This is the result of 42 U.S.C. § 16913(d), which reads:

The Attorney General shall have the authority to specify the applicability of the requirements of this subchapter to sex offenders convicted before the enactment of this chapter or its implementation in a particular jurisdiction, and to prescribe rules for the registration of any such sex offenders and for other categories of sex offenders who are unable to comply with subsection (b).

The Attorney General decided that this law is applicable to everyone convicted of a sexual offense, making the law retroactive.

=== Lower court proceedings ===
Gundy filed a motion to dismiss the single charge against him. On May 22, 2013, District Judge J. Paul Oetken of the United States District Court for the Southern District of New York granted the motion. Oetken found that Gundy was not required to comply with SORNA's registration requirements until after he served his full sentence (at which point he was in federal custody in New York), as his conviction for violation of his supervised release was, according to Oetken, "a sentence of imprisonment with respect to the offense giving rise to the registration requirement".

The prosecution appealed the dismissal to the United States Court of Appeals for the Second Circuit. Circuit Judge Susan L. Carney disagreed with the District Court's reading. She held that 42 U.S.C. § 16913(b), which states that offenders are only required to register after completing "a sentence of imprisonment with respect to the offense giving rise to the registration requirement", did not mean that the general requirement to register only applied after having completed the sentence. The Court found that Gundy was subject to SORNA as soon as it became retroactive. The District Court's judgement was thus reversed and remanded.

After a bench trial before Judge Oetken, the District Court found Gundy guilty. He was sentenced to time served and five years of supervised release. Gundy appealed the judgement to the Second Circuit. The Court of Appeals ruled that Gundy participated in voluntary interstate travel and was therefore required to register his travel to New York under SORNA. As he failed to do so, he was subject to sentencing as done by the District Court. It rejected Gundy's argument that the delegation of authority to the Attorney General within SORNA violated the nondelegation clause, based on circuit precedent in the case United States v. Guzman.

== Supreme Court ==
On September 20, 2017, Gundy's counsel petitioned for a writ of certiorari to the Court of Appeals for the Second Circuit regarding 4 questions presented:

(1) Whether convicted sex offenders are "required to register" under the federal Sex Offender Notification and Registration Act ("SORNA") while in custody, regardless of how long they have until release.

(2) Whether all offenders convicted of a qualifying sex offense prior to SORNA's enactment are "required to register" under SORNA no later than August 1, 2008.

(3) Whether a defendant violates 18 U.S.C. § 2250(a), which requires interstate travel, where his only movement between states occurs while he is in the custody of the Federal Bureau of Prisons and serving a prison sentence.

(4) Whether SORNA's delegation of authority to the Attorney General to issue regulations under 42 U.S.C. § 16913(d) violates the nondelegation doctrine.

The Supreme Court granted certiorari, though limited to question 4 of the petition, on March 5, 2018. The Cato Institute, Pacific Legal Foundation, American Civil Liberties Union, Downsize DC Foundation and various other organizations and people filed amici curiae in support of Gundy.

Oral arguments were held on October 2, 2018.

== Decision ==
On June 20, 2019 — nearly a full term after the case was argued — the Supreme Court issued their opinion.

The plurality opinion was written by Elena Kagan, who was joined by Ruth Bader Ginsburg, Stephen Breyer, and Sonia Sotomayor. Justice Kagan found that because SORNA guided the Attorney General to eventually apply the registration requirements to all offenders, it did not violate the nondelegation doctrine.

Justice Samuel Alito wrote a brief opinion concurring in the judgement. He stated that he might wish to revisit the court's approach to nondelegation "[i]f a majority of this Court were willing to reconsider the approach we have taken for the past 84 years", but that the statute at issue in this case was not unique enough. Therefore, he voted with the plurality to affirm.

Justice Neil Gorsuch, joined by Chief Justice John Roberts and Justice Clarence Thomas, filed a dissenting opinion. His opinion referenced and disagreed with Justice Alito's vote, believing that this case would be an appropriate vehicle to revisit nondelegation. He believed that the statute "hand[ed] off to the nation’s chief prosecutor the power to write his own criminal code."

== Subsequent events ==
On July 11, 2019, Gundy's counsel filed a petition for rehearing. He argued that Justice Kavanaugh's recusal had influenced Justice Alito to vote as he had and requested that the case be heard before the full court. Simultaneously, another case (Paul v. United States) resting on largely the same facts was appealed to the Supreme Court. The cases' respective rehearing and cert petitions were relisted and distributed at several conferences before both were denied. Justice Kavanaugh wrote a statement respecting the denial of certiorari in Paul, indicating that he too might wish to revisit nondelegation in a future case.

On January 26, 2024, a petition for writ of certiorari was filed in Allstates Refractory Contractors v. Su. In this case, a divided panel of the Sixth Circuit upheld the constitutionality of Congress's delegation of authority to the Occupational Safety and Health Administration (OSHA) under the Occupational Safety and Health Act. On July 2, the petition was denied. Justice Gorsuch indicated that he would have granted the petition. Dissenting from the denial, Justice Thomas wrote:

The question whether the Occupational Health and Safety Administration’s broad authority is consistent with our constitutional structure is undeniably important. At least five Justices have already expressed an interest in reconsidering this Court’s approach to Congress’s delegations of legislative power. See Paul v. United States, 589 U.S. ___, ___ (2019) (statement of Kavanaugh, J., respecting denial of certiorari) (slip op., at 2); Gundy, 588 U. S., at 149 (Alito, J., concurring in judgment); id., at 164 (Gorsuch, J., joined by Roberts, C. J., and Thomas, J., dissenting). Because this petition is an excellent vehicle to do exactly that, I would grant review.

— Allstates Refractory Contractors, 603 U.S. ___ (2024) (Thomas, J., dissenting from denial of certiorari) (capitalization removed).
