= Henry I. Harriman =

- Born: 1873; Brooklyn, New York, U.S.
- Died: July 5, 1950 (age 77); Newton, Massachusetts, U.S.
- Occupations: Corporate executive; President, U.S. Chamber of Commerce
- Children: Gordon Douglas Harriman; Eunice Alberta (Harriman) Millikin

Henry Ingraham Harriman (1873 – July 5, 1950) was an American public utility executive and President of the United States Chamber of Commerce from 1932 to 1935.

== Early life and career ==
Born in Brooklyn, New York, in 1873, he graduated from Wesleyan University in 1895, received his bachelor of laws in 1897 from New York Law School, and his Ph.D. from Wesleyan University in 1930.

He initially worked in the textile industry in Massachusetts, where he received patents for several automatic looms. In time, he became head of the Stafford Company, which manufactured his looms. He left the textile industry and engaged in the buying and selling of water rights in the Deep South before returning to the New England to build hydroelectric dams and form the New England Power Company and the Connecticut River Power Company. Harriman Dam on the Deerfield River, built in 1924, was named for him. He served as president of the New England Power Company and (until 1927) its parent, the New England Power Association, and on the board of directors of several regional New England power companies.

He was chairman of the board of trustees of the Boston Elevated Railway, Boston Chamber of Commerce (from 1917 to 1919), Division of Metropolitan Planning for Greater Boston, and the Massachusetts State Planning Board. In 1918, he was appointed a regional director of the War Industries Board.

== Chamber of Commerce and later life ==
He was president and director of the United States Chamber of Commerce from 1933 to 1935. Active in political causes, in 1937 he was appointed a delegate to the International Labour Conference (serving for many years) and the American Youth Congress.

He had two children, Gordon Douglas Harriman and Eunice Alberta (Harriman) Millikin.

Toward the end of his life, he lived in Newton, Massachusetts. He died on July 5, 1950, after a long illness at his daughter's home in Needham, Massachusetts. His home in Newton, the Henry I. Harriman House, was added to the National Register of Historic Places in 1990.
