= Panama Refining Co. v. Ryan =

- Supreme Court of the United States

Argued December 10–11, 1934 Decided January 7, 1935
- Full case name: Panama Refining Co., et al. v. Ryan, et al.
- Citations: 293 U.S. 388 (more) 55 S. Ct. 241; 79 L. Ed. 446; 1935 U.S. LEXIS 251

Holding
- Specific parameters must be laid down in the delegation of power to the President to enforce legislative statutes.

Court membership
- Chief Justice Charles E. Hughes Associate Justices Willis Van Devanter · James C. McReynolds; Louis Brandeis · George Sutherland; Pierce Butler · Harlan F. Stone; Owen Roberts · Benjamin N. Cardozo

Case opinions
- Majority: Hughes, joined by Van Devanter, McReynolds, Brandeis, Sutherland, Butler, Stone, Roberts
- Dissent: Cardozo

Panama Refining Co. v. Ryan, 293 U.S. 388 (1935), also known as the Hot Oil case, was a case in which the US Supreme Court ruled that the Franklin Roosevelt administration's prohibition of interstate and foreign trade in petroleum goods produced in excess of state quotas, the "hot oil" orders adopted under the 1933 National Industrial Recovery Act (NIRA), was unconstitutional.

The ruling was the first of several that overturned key elements of the administration's New Deal legislative program. The relevant section 9(c) of the NIRA was found to be an unconstitutional delegation of legislative power, as it permitted presidential interdiction of trade without defining criteria for the application of the proposed restriction.

The finding thus differed from later rulings that argued that federal government action affecting intrastate production breached the Commerce Clause of the Constitution. In Panama v. Ryan, the Court found that Congress had violated the nondelegation doctrine by vesting the President with legislative powers without clear guidelines and by giving the President enormous and unchecked powers. The omission of congressional guidance on state petroleum production ceilings occasioned the adverse ruling because it allowed the executive to assume the role of the legislature.

Justice Cardozo dissented and claimed that the guidelines had been sufficient.

== Background ==
In 1933, President Franklin D. Roosevelt delegated broad authority to the Secretary of the Interior to enforce § 9(c) of the National Industrial Recovery Act. The Secretary subsequently issued regulations requiring participants in the petroleum industry to report production and transportation activities and to maintain records demonstrating compliance with state production limits.

In August 1933, the President issued an executive order approving the "Code of Fair Competition for the Petroleum Industry" (the Petroleum Code) under Title I of the National Industrial Recovery Act. The code established a system of production quotas for the petroleum industry, with output allocated among the states and then distributed among individual producers. Oil produced in excess of an assigned quota was treated as a violation of the code and subject to federal penalties.

In October 1933, several petroleum companies filed suit, arguing that the regulations and executive orders rested on an unconstitutional delegation of legislative power. A federal district court issued an injunction against enforcement, but the decision was reversed on appeal.

The Panama Refining decision followed the Court's recognition in Nebbia v. New York that the Due Process Clause of the Fourteenth Amendment did not restrict legislatures from enacting price controls and other economic regulations they deemed to be in the public interest. In Panama Refining litigants primarily challenged the statute as an infringement on freedom of contract, with the nondelegation argument presented as an alternate basis for invalidating the statute. After decades of unsuccessful nondelegation challenges to public-utility legislation it became the first case to invalidate a statute on non-delegation grounds, thereby imposing a structural limit on legislative power without reviving the judicial doctrines abandoned in Nebbia.

== Legal background ==
Before Panama Refining Co. v. Ryan, the Supreme Court's nondelegation jurisprudence included a series of cases concerning utility regulation. The Court upheld the delegation of authority to regulate railroad rates in Reagan v. Farmers' Loan & Trust Co. (1894), describing the commission as an administrative body carrying out the state's legislative will. At the same time, Reagan referred to the commission's rate-setting as an "act of quasi legislation," illustrating the emerging recognition that administrative bodies could exercise powers resembling legislation while formally acting under authority delegated by the legislature. The Supreme Court later confirmed that this applied to utilities in Knoxville v. Knoxville Water Co. (1906). The Court consistently upheld delegations of rate-making authority to subordinate bodies, treating rate-making as legislative in character and recognizing that the legislature could “commit the authority to fix rates to a subordinate body.”

The Court likewise upheld other delegations of legislative authority as “quasi legislative” when expertise was required. In Consolidated Coal Co. v. Illinois (1902), the Court upheld a delegation to state mine inspectors to classify mines for purposes of inspection, explaining that “[i]n enacting a law with regard to the inspection of mines, we see no objection, in case the legislature find it impracticable to classify the mines for the purposes of inspection, to commit that power to a body of experts."

In Jacobson v. Massachusetts (1905), the Supreme Court upheld a Massachusetts statute authorizing local boards of health to require smallpox vaccination when they determined that it was necessary for public health or safety. The Court reasoned that the legislature could entrust such determinations to local officials because the appropriate response to a public-health emergency had to be determined by some body with knowledge of local conditions. Another case involving the delegation of authority to boards of health soon followed. In New York ex rel. Lieberman v. Van De Carr (1907), the Court upheld a New York City ordinance requiring milk dealers to obtain permits subject to conditions prescribed by the Board of Health.

Two subsequent cases concerned powers delegated to the President. In United States v. Chemical Foundation (1926), the Court upheld the President's authority to approve private sales of seized enemy property, reasoning that he was applying the general rule established by Congress rather than making law. In J. W. Hampton, Jr. & Co. v. United States (1928), the Court upheld the delegation of authority to adjust customs duties, explaining that Congress could vest executive officers with discretion “within defined limits” to secure the effect intended by its legislation.

== Supreme Court ==
The decision set out two principles:

1. Congress could not delegate to an executive or administrative official or board complete and unlimited authority to legislate on a subject without reference to a standard.
2. When Congress delegated regulatory authority to an executive or administrative official or board, the exercise of that authority had to depend upon a finding of fact reflected in the resulting executive or administrative regulation.

Applying J. W. Hampton, Jr. & Co. v. United States (1928) the Court concluded that Section 9(c) was unconstitutional because it conferred essentially unbounded discretion to the President.

Justice Benjamin N. Cardozo, in dissent, compared the delegation to earlier cases, including Field v. Clark (1892), in which the Court had upheld delegations because the President's authority depended on the occurrence of a condition established by Congress. Cardozo viewed section 9(c) similarly, arguing that the President's authority to prohibit the interstate shipment of petroleum depended on production exceeding the amount permitted by state law.

== Legislative response ==
To help ensure that NIRA's regulation of "hot oil" could be restored with the procedural safeguards which the Supreme Court recommended in Panama Refining, the Connally Hot Oil Act of 1935 was passed into law.

The Federal Register Act of 1935 required all documents having "general applicability and legal effect" to be officially published so courts would not issue rulings on superseded regulations as the courts below did in Panama Refining.

== Subsequent developments ==
Only Panama Refining Co. v. Ryan and A.L.A. Schechter Poultry Corp. v. United States have resulted in a statute being invalidated under the intelligible principle standard. After 1935, the Supreme Court has consistently upheld broad delegations of authority to the executive branch. In Yakus v. United States (1944), the Court upheld authority granted to the Office of Price Administration to establish commodity price controls that the Administrator judged “fair and equitable” as a “war emergency measure.” Similarly, in National Broadcasting Co. v. United States (1943), the Court upheld the Federal Communications Commission's authority to regulate broadcasting in the “public interest, convenience, or necessity.” In each case, the Court found the delegation consistent with the intelligible principle standard.

A plurality of the Supreme Court avoided a nondelegation ruling in Industrial Union Department, AFL-CIO v. American Petroleum Institute (1980), the Benzene case, by interpreting the Occupational Safety and Health Act to require the Occupational Safety and Health Administration to determine that an unregulated level of exposure posed a significant health risk before imposing a stringent standard.

Lower federal courts have occasionally invoked the doctrine, most notably in Whitman v. American Trucking Associations (2001). There, the D.C. Circuit concluded that the Environmental Protection Agency lacked a sufficiently determinate standard for setting air-quality standards under the Clean Air Act. Rather than invalidate the delegation, the court remanded the case to allow the agency to formulate a more definite standard. The Supreme Court unanimously reversed, reaffirming the intelligible principle requirement and concluding that the statutory direction to set standards “requisite to protect the public health” with an “adequate margin of safety” provided sufficient guidance. The Court also rejected the D.C. Circuit’s approach of allowing an agency to formulate a narrowing construction of an otherwise unconstitutional delegation, emphasizing that fundamental policy decisions must be made by Congress rather than administrative agencies. Although Whitman did not revive the nondelegation doctrine, it reaffirmed its constitutional basis and left open the possibility of judicial enforcement while indicating that courts should approach such challenges cautiously. Justice Antonin Scalia observed in Mistretta v. United States (1989) that it was difficult to imagine any standard “too vague to survive judicial scrutiny”.

== See also ==
- Connally Hot Oil Act of 1935

== Works cited ==
- Cousens, Theodore W. (1935). "The Delegation of Federal Legislative Power to Executive Officials". Michigan Law Review. 33 (4): 516, 523–527.
- Hickman, Kristin E. (2021). "Nondelegation as Constitutional Symbolism". The George Washington Law Review. 89: 1079.
- May, Randolph J. (2001). "The Public Interest Standard: Is It Too Indeterminate to Be Constitutional?". Federal Communications Law Journal. 53 (3).
