= A.L.A. Schechter Poultry Corp. v. United States =

1935 U.S. Supreme Court case which declared key parts of the New Deal unconstitutional

Schechter Poultry Corp. v. United States
- Supreme Court of the United States

Argued May 2–3, 1935 Decided May 27, 1935
- Full case name: A. L. A. Schechter Poultry Corporation v. United States
- Citations: 295 U.S. 495 (more) 55 S. Ct. 837; 79 L. Ed. 1570; 1935 U.S. LEXIS 1088; 1935 Trade Cas. (CCH) ¶ 55,072; 2 Ohio Op. 493; 97 A.L.R. 947

Case history
- Prior: Defendants convicted, United States v. Schechter, 8 F.Supp. 136 (E.D.N.Y. 1934); affirmed in part, reversed in part, 76 F.2d 617 (2d Cir. 1935); cert. granted, 295 U.S. 723 (1935)

Holding
- Section 3 of the National Industrial Recovery Act was an unconstitutional delegation of legislative power to the Executive, and was not a valid exercise of congressional Commerce Clause power. United States Court of Appeals for the Second Circuit affirmed in part and reversed in part.

Court membership
- Chief Justice Charles E. Hughes Associate Justices Willis Van Devanter · James C. McReynolds; Louis Brandeis · George Sutherland; Pierce Butler · Harlan F. Stone; Owen Roberts · Benjamin N. Cardozo

Case opinions
- Majority: Hughes, joined by Van Devanter, McReynolds, Brandeis, Sutherland, Butler, Roberts
- Concurrence: Cardozo, joined by Stone

Laws applied
- U.S. Const. art. I; U.S. Const. amend. X; 15 U.S.C. § 703 (1933) (National Industrial Recovery Act § 3)

A.L.A. Schechter Poultry Corp. v. United States, 295 U.S. 495 (1935), was a decision by the Supreme Court of the United States that invalidated regulations of the poultry industry according to the nondelegation doctrine and as an invalid use of Congress' power under the Commerce Clause. This unanimous decision rendered parts of the National Industrial Recovery Act of 1933 (NIRA), a main component of President Franklin D. Roosevelt's New Deal, unconstitutional. The case from which the ruling stemmed was nicknamed the "Sick Chicken Case".

== Context ==
The regulations at issue were promulgated under the authority of the NIRA of 1933. These included price and wage fixing, as well as requirements regarding the sale of whole chickens, including unhealthy ones. The government claimed the Schechter brothers sold sick poultry, which has led to the case becoming known as "the sick chicken case". Also encompassed in the decision were NIRA provisions regarding maximum work hours and a right of unions to organize. The ruling was one of a series which overturned elements of President Roosevelt's New Deal legislation between January 1935 and January 1936, until the Court's intolerance of economic regulations shifted with West Coast Hotel Co. v. Parrish.

The NIRA allowed local codes for trade to be written by private trade and industrial groups. The President could choose to give some codes the force of law. In defending the constitutionality of the Live Poultry Code, adopted under the NIRA, the government maintained that Congress's commerce power extended to local activities that affected the interstate poultry trade. The issue arose against the background of the Court's earlier decision in Local 167 of International Brotherhood of Teamsters v. United States (1934), which applied the Sherman Antitrust Act to a conspiracy involving intrastate conduct that directly interfered with the interstate movement of live poultry. The Court distinguished that case because the conspiracy directly obstructed interstate commerce, whereas the activities regulated by the Live Poultry Code had only an indirect effect on interstate commerce.

The Supreme Court's opposition caused Roosevelt to attempt to pack the Court with judges who were in favor of the New Deal. There were originally 60 charges against Schechter Poultry, which were reduced to 18 charges plus charges of conspiracy by the time the case was heard by the U.S. Supreme Court. Among the 18 charges against Schechter Poultry were "the sale to a butcher of an unfit chicken" and the sale of two uninspected chickens. Ten charges were for violating codes requiring "straight killing". Straight killing prohibited customers from selecting the chickens they wanted; instead a customer had to place his hand in the coop and select the first chicken that came to hand. There was laughter during oral arguments when Justice George Sutherland asked, "Well suppose however that all the chickens have gone over to one end of the coop?"

== Judgment ==
Chief Justice Charles Evans Hughes wrote for a unanimous Court in invalidating the industrial "codes of fair competition", which the NIRA enabled the President to issue. The Court held that the codes violated the constitutional separation of powers as an impermissible delegation of legislative power to the executive branch. The Court also held that the NIRA provisions were in excess of congressional power under the Commerce Clause. The Court distinguished between direct effects on interstate commerce, which Congress could lawfully regulate, and indirect effects, which were purely matters of state law. Although the raising and sale of poultry was an interstate industry, the Court found that the "stream of interstate commerce" had stopped in this case – Schechter's slaughterhouse's chickens were sold exclusively to in-state buyers. Any interstate effect of Schechter was indirect, and therefore beyond federal reach.

Although many considered the NIRA a "dead statute" at this point in the New Deal scheme, the Court used its invalidation as an opportunity to affirm constitutional limits on congressional power, for fear that it could otherwise reach virtually anything that could be said to affect interstate commerce and intrude on many areas of legitimate state power. The court ruled that the law violated the Tenth Amendment. According to Supreme Court historian David P. Currie, the Court believed that "to permit Congress to regulate the wages and hours in a tiny slaughterhouse because of remote effects on interstate commerce would leave nothing for the tenth amendment to reserve". Currie added that "it can hardly have escaped the Justices that apart from its limitation to business there was little to distinguish what Congress had attempted from the 1933 legislation authorizing Adolf Hitler to govern Germany by decree ... the delegation decision in Schechter was a salutary reminder of the Framers' decision to vest legislative power in a representative assembly."

Justice Benjamin Cardozo's concurring opinion clarified that a spectrum approach to direct and indirect effects is preferable to a strict dichotomy. Cardozo felt that in this case, Schechter was simply too small a player to be relevant to interstate commerce. This traditional reading of the Commerce Clause was later disavowed by the Court, after the "court-packing plan" by President Roosevelt, began to read congressional power more expansively in this area, in cases such as NLRB v. Jones & Laughlin Steel Corp (1937). Later cases, such as United States v. Lopez (1995), perhaps signal a growing inclination in the Court to once again affirm limits on its scope. In a unanimous 2011 decision, Bond v. United States, the Supreme Court cited Schechter as a precedent.

== Significance ==
Speaking to aides of Roosevelt, Justice Louis Brandeis remarked: "This is the end of this business of centralization, and I want you to go back and tell the president that we're not going to let this government centralize everything." In Hyde Park, New York, a few days after the decision, Roosevelt denounced the decision as an antiquated interpretation of the Commerce Clause. After the decision was announced, newspapers reported that 500 cases of NIRA code violations were going to be dropped.

== See also ==
- United States labor law
- Panama Refining Co. v. Ryan (1935)
- Louisville Joint Stock Land Bank v. Radford (1935)
- Constitutional challenges to the New Deal
