= Payne–Aldrich Tariff Act =

1909 U.S. law increasing tariffs on certain imports

- Other short titles: Tariff Act of 1909
- Long title: An Act To provide revenue, equalize duties and encourage the industries of the United States, and for other purposes
- Nicknames: Corporation Tax Act
- Enacted by: the 61st United States Congress
- Effective: August 6, 1909

Citations
- Statutes at Large: 36 Stat. 11

Legislative history
- Introduced in the House of Representatives as H.R. 1438 by Sereno E. Payne (R‑NY) on March 17, 1909; Committee consideration by House Committee on Ways and Means; Passed the House of Representatives on April 9, 1909 (217–161); Passed the Senate on July 8, 1909 (45–34); Reported by the joint conference committee on July 12 – July 29, 1909; agreed to by the House of Representatives on July 31, 1909 (195–183) and by the Senate on August 5, 1909 (47–31); Signed into law by President William Howard Taft on August 5, 1909

United States Supreme Court cases
- Flint v. Stone Tracy Co.

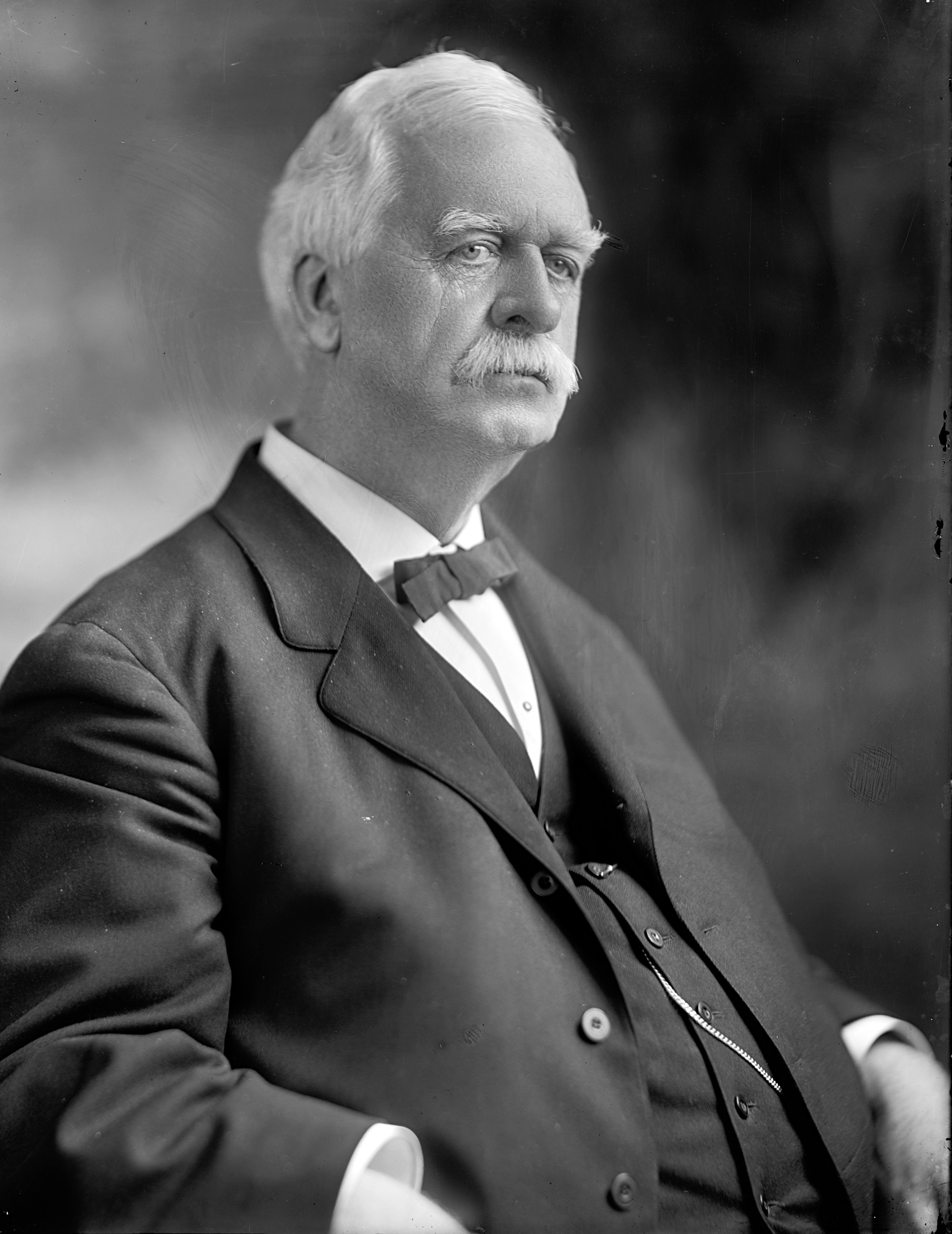
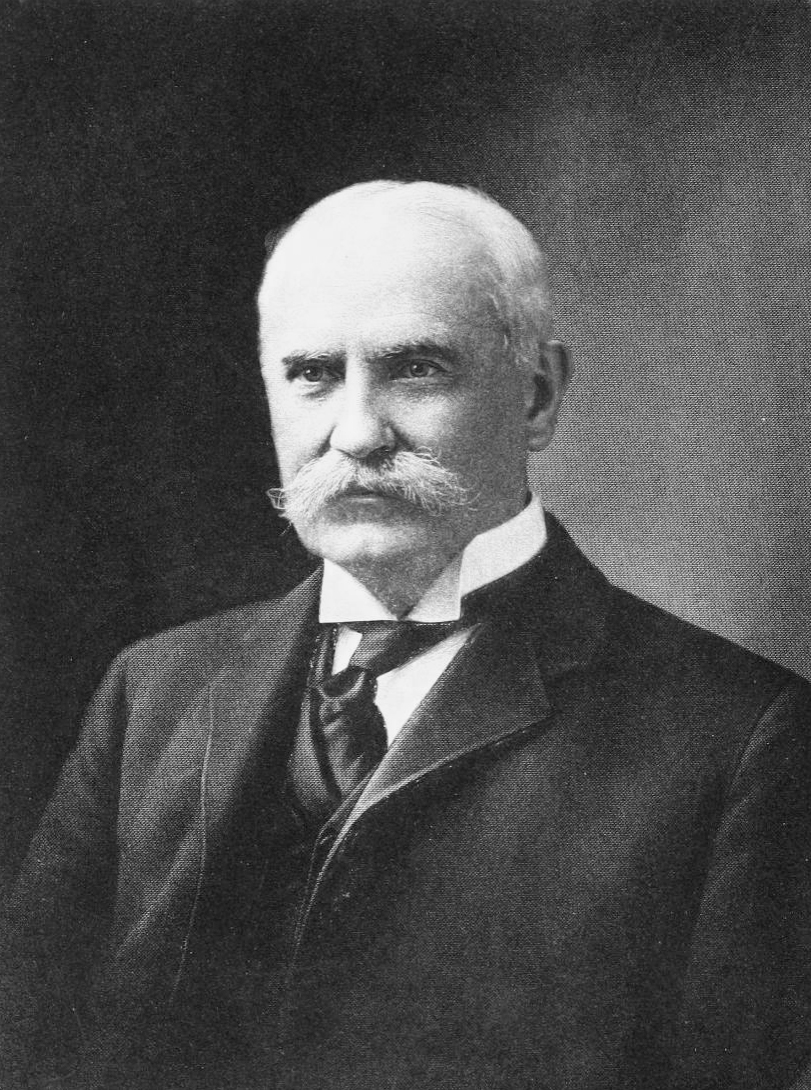
Sereno E. Payne of New York, chair of the House Ways and Means Committee (left) and Nelson W. Aldrich of Rhode Island, chair of the Senate Finance Committee (right) dominated the debate and drafting of the tariff bill.

The Payne–Aldrich Tariff Act of 1909 (ch. 6, 36 Stat. 11), sometimes referred to as the Tariff of 1909, is a United States federal law that amended the United States tariff schedules to raise certain tariffs on goods entering the United States. It is named for U.S. representative Sereno E. Payne of New York and U.S. senator Nelson W. Aldrich of Rhode Island.

The tariff began as a measure to enact the "tariff modification" plank of the Republican Party platform, which appealed to exporters, particularly Midwestern farmers and agriculture interests, and was understood by most contemporaries to mean a reduction in most rates. Although the final bill included provisions for a commission to study rates and free trade with the Philippines, it increased rates on most goods, angering progressives, who argued that high protective rates promoted monopoly, and led to a deep split in the Republican Party which culminated in the 1912 presidential primaries. The legislative debate over the bill also led directly to the adoption of a federal income tax via the Sixteenth Amendment to the United States Constitution.

== Background ==
From the inception of the Republican Party in the 1850s and particularly after the 1880s, Republican candidates and supporters had embraced the American system of political economy and Hamiltonian vision of a protective tariff for the promotion of industrial development. Under this system, high tariff rates were intended to promote higher sales of domestic goods and higher wages for industrial workers; critics argued that the system taxed consumers. In 1896, William McKinley was elected president on a platform proposing tariff increases and his own record as an advocate for protective tariffs. The Dingley Act of 1897 placed average rates on imports at 47% and remained in effect until 1909.

By 1908, however, protective tariffs had begun to fall out of public favor. The growing consolidation and monopolization of heavy industry, in particular the political power of U.S. Steel and Standard Oil Company, had led to public criticism and rejection of the system of high protective tariff rates. In addition to traditional Democratic opposition, progressive insurgents within the Republican Party, primarily from the Midwest, criticized protective tariffs for promoting monopoly. As a result, the platform adopted at the 1908 Republican National Convention called for revision of rates until they "equal the difference between the cost of production at home and abroad, with a reasonable profit to American industry." This plank, according to The New York Times, was taken as a "freed-trade plank as to very large portions of our actual and possible foreign commerce." Republican nominee William Howard Taft won the 1908 election, and in a December interview with the Times, emphasized his view that although the language of the plank was "not entirely clear," he interpreted it to mean that "the measure of the tariff should be the difference between the cost of production of the article in this country and such cost abroad," with such estimated costs including consideration of "a reasonable manufacturer's profit."

== Legislative history ==
On November 10, 1908, two days after Taft's election, the United States House Committee on Ways and Means opened public hearings on tariff revision which lasted until the holiday recess on December 24. During his inaugural address, Taft declared that he would veto any tariff bill that did not lower rates and called for a two percent tax on corporate profits to supplement government revenues. It appeared to much of the country that he had endorsed the traditional Democratic Party position of a tariff for the purpose of government revenue only (and not for industrial protection).

In keeping with his political promises, Taft called a special session of the 61st United States Congress on March 15, 1909, soon after his inauguration, to address the subject of tariff reform. However, he heeded the advice of Ways and Means chair Sereno E. Payne, Speaker of the House Joe Cannon, and senator Nelson W. Aldrich, who would lead the debate in the Senate, to refrain from interference until the bill reached a conference. Their advice was consistent with Taft's belief that the president should not take an active role in the legislative process.

Because tariff legislation is a form of tax policy, all tariff bills originated in the United States House of Representatives, with Payne's committee. On March 17, 1909, Payne introduced an initial draft bill that called for reductions, although he was a protectionist. However, during the House debate over the bill, several representatives introduced revisions to increase rates on products manufactured in their districts with support from Speaker Cannon. Despite these revisions, Taft reacted favorably when the House bill passed 217–61 and refused to threaten a veto or to withhold federal patronage from the opponents of reform.

In the Senate, the bill was revised under the leadership of Nelson W. Aldrich, an ardent protectionist and veteran of numerous congressional tariff debates over the prior decades. Aldrich consulted with lobbyists for American industries throughout the spring and summer of 1909. Without offering a public explanation, Aldrich made nearly 900 revisions to the House bill, including increases in 600 rates, and sought to prevent review of the document by reformers. The Senate bill passed in early July, 45–34. Reformers objected to the rate increases as well as the strong-arm legislative tactics employed by Aldrich.

To reconcile the two versions of the bill, the House and Senate appointed a select conference committee. Speaker Cannon and Aldrich stacked the committee with a majority of protectionists. During the conference debate, Aldrich did concede to include a corporation tax but rejected all amendments lowering rates further. The bill narrowly passed the House on July 30, 195–183, with twenty Republicans crossing party lines to join a solid Democratic bloc against the bill. The bill passed the Senate on August 5, 47–31, with ten Republicans dissenting.

President Taft signed the bill into law at 5:05 pm on August 5, 1909.

== Contents ==
One provision of the law provided for the creation of a tariff board to study the problem of tariff modification in full and to collect information on the subject for the use of Congress and the President in future tariff considerations. Another provision allowed for free trade with the Philippines, then under American control. Congress passed the bill officially on April 9, 1909. The bill states it would "take effect the day following its passage."

== Reaction and impact ==
=== Political reaction ===
Taft hoped that the act would stimulate the economy and enhance his political standing. He praised the provision empowering the president to raise rates on countries which discriminated against American products and the provision for free trade with the Philippines. Taft embarked on a speaking tour in September 1909, speaking across the country in support of the Payne–Aldrich Act, visiting Boston, Chicago, Milwaukee, and other cities. At Winona, Minnesota, Taft said it was "the best tariff bill the Republican Party ever passed."

It immediately frustrated proponents of tariffs reform. In particular, the increased duty on print paper led the publishing industry to viciously criticize Taft, further tarnishing his image, and the Congress. Some critics charged that Taft should have more actively pressed Congress for reductions. The reaction further divided the progressive, insurgent faction of the Republican Party from its "Old Guard." This split led to the party's losses in the 1910 elections and a challenge against Taft by his predecessor, Theodore Roosevelt, in the 1912 presidential primaries. After Taft won the nomination at the 1912 Republican National Convention, Roosevelt contested the general election on an independent ticket and split the Republican vote, resulting in the election of Woodrow Wilson, the Democratic nominee. During the next Congress, Wilson signed the Revenue Act of 1913, lowering tariff rates across the board and introducing the first federal income tax. Thereafter, the United States government relied on income taxes for an increasing proportion of revenues.

=== Academic reactions ===
In an article for the Quarterly Journal of Economics, F. W. Taussig wrote that the congressional debates about the tariffs were "depressing for the economist. There is hardly a gleam of general reasoning of the sort which is applied in our books to questions of international trade... That there should be general acceptance of the protectionist principle, and that the only question in debate should be whether duties were "unreasonably" high, was natural enough. Most people get used to existing conditions, and cannot easily conceive of anything different."

=== Legal challenges ===
The corporate tax provision was challenged and affirmed by the United States Supreme Court in Flint v. Stone Tracy Co.
