= Federalist No. 59 =

Federalist Paper by Alexander Hamilton

- Alexander Hamilton, author of Federalist No. 59
- Author: Alexander Hamilton
- Original title: Concerning the Power of Congress to Regulate the Election of Members
- Language: English
- Series: The Federalist
- Publisher: New York Packet
- Publication date: February 22, 1788
- Publication place: United States
- Media type: Newspaper
- Preceded by: Federalist No. 58
- Followed by: Federalist No. 60

Federalist No. 59 is an essay by Alexander Hamilton, the fifty-ninth of The Federalist Papers. It was first published by The New York Packet on February 22, 1788, under the pseudonym Publius, the name under which all The Federalist Papers were published. This is the first of three papers discussing the power of Congress over the election of its own members, the other two papers in this series being Federalist No. 60 and Federalist No. 61. The title of the paper is "Concerning the Power of Congress to Regulate the Election of Members".

In this paper, Hamilton argues that the federal government should be the only entity within the government as a whole that can regulate its own elections, rather than the states or any other entity being able to regulate those elections. Allowing the states to regulate the elections of the federal government would leave existence of a federalist Union entirely at the mercy of those states.

== Background ==
Hamilton argued that the Article I, Section 4, specifically the first clause, of the constitution was completely defensible and important for the very core of the federal government because according to him in Federalist 59:

Every Government ought to contain in itself the means of its own preservation.

The clause states:

The Times, Places and Manner of holding Elections for Senators and Representatives, shall be prescribed in each State by the Legislature thereof; but the Congress may at any time by Law make or alter such Regulations, except as to the Places of chusing Senators.

== Outline ==
As Hamilton states:

Suppose an Article had been introduced into the Constitution, empowering the United States to regulate the elections of the particular States, would any man have hesitated to condemn it, both as an unwarrantable transposition of power, and as a premeditated engine for the destruction of the State Governments?

This statement by Hamilton pinpoints the exact point that he is trying to convince the American people of. If they, the people, would condemn this supposed article, then they should also condemn an article that would do the same thing, but in reverse. An article that would have allowed the states to regulate the elections of the federal government. This would put the Union at a great risk as Hamilton notes:

Nothing can be more evident, than that an exclusive power of regulating elections for the National Government, in the hands of the State Legislatures, would leave the existence of the Union entirely at their mercy. They could at any moment annihilate it, by neglecting to provide for the choice of persons to administer its affairs.

If an abuse of power would be condemned one way, then it should be condemned the other way as well. If the states were allowed to regulate the elections of the Federal House of Representatives then the legislatures of a few important states could enter into a conspiracy to prevent an election, and then this could result in the Union's destruction. Hamilton was not fully against the state legislatures having some power over the federal government. He fully defended the states' power to appoint members of the senate. He saw this as a necessary check on the power of the federal government, a "necessary evil." As he states:

So far as that construction may expose the Union to the possibility of injury from the State Legislatures, it is an evil; but it is an evil which could not have been avoided without excluding the States, in their political capacities, wholly from a place in the organization of the National Government.If this had been done, it would doubtless have been interpreted into an entire dereliction of the Federal principle; and would certainly have deprived the State Governments of that absolute safeguard.

Each state only has the power to appoint two senators and no more. No single state or even a few states would be able to destroy the union by not appointing senators. The states would have to work together to be able to destroy the union in this way and that is a scenario that extremely unlikely to happen.

== 17th Amendment ==
Main Article: 17th Amendment to the United States Constitution

In 1913 the 17th amendment was passed and signed into law. This amendment effectively defeated Hamilton's argument on the matter of the election of senators and the necessary evil that he saw as a check by the states on the power of the federal government. Specifically, Article 1, Amendment 17,

The Senate of the United States shall be composed of two Senators from each State, elected by the people thereof, for six years; and each Senator shall have one vote. The electors in each State shall have the qualifications requisite for electors of the most numerous branch of the State legislatures."

== Anti-Federalist Papers ==
=== Cato No. VII ===
The anonymous author of Cato No. VII argues that Article 1 Section 4 of the constitution should be removed. By giving congressional power over the regulation of elections they can choose to do anything thing they desire. As stated by the author:

Congress may establish a place, or places, at either the extremes, center or outer parts of the states; at a time and season too, when it may be very inconvenient to attend; and by these means destroy the rights of election.

As argued below by the author, although the states choose the senators, the House of Representatives chooses the time and place that the senators are chosen.

To exemplify this the states are to appoint senators and electors for choosing a president, but the time is to be under the direction of congress. Now, suppose they were to omit the appointment of senators and electors, though congress was to appoint the time, which might [as] well be apprehended as the omission of regulations for the election of members of the house of representatives, provided they had that power; or suppose they were not to meet at all: of course, the government cannot proceed in its exercise.

As argued below, if the House would be able to regulate its own elections, they could choose to have elections anywhere they wanted to. They could move voting precincts into areas where there would be almost no one the vote for them, basically allowing the representatives to choose their voters.

It is a good rule, in the construction of a contract, to support, that what may be done will be; therefore, in considering this subject, you are to suppose, that in the exercise of this government, regulation of congress will be made, for holding an election for the whole state at Poughkeepsie, at New York, or, perhaps, at Fort Stanwix: who will then be the actual electors for the house of representatives? Very few more than those who may live in the vicinity of these places.
