= Blue slip =

Blue slip or blue-slipping may refer to:

- Blue slip (U.S. Senate), a form where senators from the state of residence of a federal judicial nominee can give an opinion on the nominee
- Blue slip (U.S. House of Representatives), a rejection given to tax and spending bills sent to the House by the Senate without originating in the House
- Blue Slip, a New York street and development area with two of the tallest buildings in Brooklyn, One Blue Slip and Two Blue Slip
