= Reading (legislature) =

Stage of consideration of a bill in a legislature

A reading of a bill is a stage of debate on the bill held by a general body of a legislature.

In the Westminster system, developed in the United Kingdom, there are generally three readings of a bill as it passes through the stages of becoming, or failing to become, legislation. Some of these readings may be formalities rather than actual debate. Legislative bodies in the United States also have readings.

The procedure dates back to the centuries before literacy was widespread. Since many members of Parliament were illiterate, the Clerk of Parliament would read aloud a bill to inform members of its contents. By the end of the 16th century, it was practice to have the bill read on three occasions before it was passed.

== Preliminary reading ==
In the Israeli Knesset, private member bills do not enter the house at first reading. Instead, they are subject to a preliminary reading, where the members introducing the bill present it to the Knesset, followed by a debate on the general outlines of the bill followed by a vote on whether to send it to committee to be prepared for first reading or to remove it from the agenda.

== First reading ==
A first reading is when a bill is introduced to a legislature.

Typically, in the United States, the title of the bill is read and the bill is immediately assigned to a committee. The bill is then considered by committee between the first and second readings. In the United States Senate and most British-influenced legislatures, the committee consideration occurs between second and third readings.

In most non Westminster-style legislatures, a vote is taken on the general outlines of the bill before being sent to committee.

=== Australia ===
In the Australian House of Representatives, a bill is automatically read a first time without any question being proposed upon presentation of the bill or it being received from the Senate.

However, in the Australian Senate, the question on the first reading is always moved immediately after introduction (which is a separate motion altogether) or receipt from the House of Representatives and may be voted on. Amendments to or debate on the first reading is not permitted, except for bills subject to section 53 of the Constitution (i.e. appropriation and money bills), in which case debate is permitted. This exception is necessary because section 53 gives senators the right to move requests to the House of Representatives for amendments to a financial bill (to which the Senate is not allowed to amend) at any stage of consideration of the bill, including on the first reading.

The first readings of most ordinary bills are almost always a formality and are passed "on the voices". In extremely rare circumstances however, the Senate may vote against the first reading, which prevents the bill from proceeding further. This has happened as recently as June 2021, when the Ministerial Suitability Commission of Inquiry Bill 2021 (Cth), introduced by Greens Senator Larissa Waters in relation to the 1988 rape allegation against the Attorney-General Christian Porter, was narrowly negatived in a division.

Similar arrangements are in place in the parliaments of the states and territories.

=== Canada ===
In the House of Commons of Canada, in addition to the usual introduction of a bill by a member for first reading, a member of the cabinet may move a motion to appoint or to instruct a committee to prepare a bill.

=== Hong Kong ===
In the Legislative Council of Hong Kong, the short title of the bill is read by the clerk at a council meeting as a formality. The bill is published in the Legal Supplement No. 3 of the gazette prior to the first reading.

=== Republic of Ireland ===
In the Oireachtas of Ireland, the first stage of a bill is by either of two methods:

- introduction by a private member moving a motion "that leave be given to introduce" the bill—the bill goes to second stage if the motion is carried
- presentation on behalf of either the government (unlimited numbers) or a parliamentary group (one at a time per group in the Dáil, three in the Seanad)—the bill automatically goes to second stage

=== Israel ===
In the Israeli Knesset, the committee consideration occurs between first and second readings and (for private member bills) between preliminary and first readings, and the first reading includes a debate on the general outlines of the bill followed by a vote on whether or not to send it to committee.

=== New Zealand ===
In New Zealand, once a bill passes first reading it is normally referred to a select committee. However, the government can have a bill skip the select committee stage by a simple majority vote in Parliament.

It was possible in the earliest years of the New Zealand Parliament for a bill to be defeated on first reading if a member introduced it and no one seconded it, even if the first reading did not require a formal vote. However, the practice of requiring a seconder for a motion has since been removed, and thus an introduced bill cannot be defeated until the end of its first reading.

=== Poland ===
In the Polish Sejm, the first reading comprises a debate on the general outlines of the bill. Notably, only constitutional amendment bills, money bills, electoral law bills, and law code bills have their first reading at a plenary session of the Sejm; all other bills have their first reading occur in committee, unless the Marshal of the Sejm decides to refer them to the plenum.

=== Russia ===
In the Russian State Duma, the first reading includes a debate on the general outlines of the bill followed by a vote on whether or not to send it to committee.

=== United Kingdom ===
In both Houses of the British Parliament, bills introduced by the government or by MPs and Lords who won the private members' ballot automatically receive a first reading without the need for the bill being discussed or voted on; the same applies for bills brought from the other House (for example, a bill which has completed all its stages in the House of Lords is immediately brought to the House of Commons, where it receives a first reading).

Bills introduced under the Ten Minute Rule are subject to a debate lasting not more than ten minutes (equally divided between a supporter and an opponent), followed by a vote is held on the motion "That leave be granted to bring in" the bill; the latter receives a first reading only if the motion is carried.

After a bill has been read a first time, it is ordered to be printed.

== Second reading ==
A second reading is the stage of the legislative process where a draft of a bill is read a second time.

In most Westminster-style legislatures, a vote is taken on the general outlines of the bill before being sent to committee. In most non-Westminster-style legislatures, the bill's detailed provisions are considered in the second reading, and then voted on clause by clause.

=== Hong Kong ===
In Legislative Council of Hong Kong, the second reading of the bill starts with the government official or member who introduces the bill moving the motion,"that the bill be read the second time", which they will explain the purpose of the bill. The debate on the bill would then usually been adjourned after the motion is moved, with the bill referred to the House Committee, a committee consisting of all members of the Legislative Council, to allow Members more time to study it. This will be done either in the House Committee, or in a bills committee set up by the House Committee.

The debate on the Second Reading will then resume at a resumed council meeting after the bill has been examined and debated on by the House Committee or a bills committee. A vote will then be taken by the council after moving the motion "that the bill be read the second time". If the motion is not passed, the bill will have failed. If it is passed, the bill will be given the second reading.

=== Republic of Ireland ===
In the Oireachtas of Ireland, the second reading is referred to as "second stage", though the subheading "second reading" is used in Dáil standing orders, and the motion at second stage is still "that the Bill is to be read a second time". A bill introduced in one house enters the other house at second stage, except that the Seanad second stage is waived for Dáil consolidation bills. Once the bill passes second stage it is referred to a select committee of that house or taken in committee stage by the whole house.

=== Israel ===
In the Knesset, the bill's detailed provisions are considered in the second reading, and then voted on clause by clause. However, continuous stretches of clauses without any proposed amendments (which includes different wordings for the same clause written in the original bill), are voted as a single bloc. The starting point for the bill considered in second reading is its post-committee consideration text, which can vary widely from the bill voted on in first reading, even to the point of mergers and splits.

=== New Zealand ===
In New Zealand, once a bill passes a second reading it is then considered clause-by-clause by the whole Parliament. If a majority of Parliament agree, the bill can be considered part-by-part, saving considerable time. Because most bills must have majority support to pass a second reading, it is now very rare for a bill to be considered clause-by-clause.

=== Poland ===
In the Polish Sejm, the second reading comprises a consideration of the committee's report on the bill (as committee consideration between first and second readings), and an introduction of any proposed amendments, although the Sejm's standing orders do not provide for a clause by clause vote on the bill itself, or on any amendment, during the second reading. If amendments are introduced to a bill, it is returned for further committee consideration between second and third readings unless the Sejm decides otherwise.

=== Russia ===
In the Russian State Duma, the bill's detailed provisions are considered in the second reading, and then voted on clause by clause.

=== United Kingdom ===
In both Houses of the British Parliament the second reading includes a debate on the general outlines of the bill, followed by a vote on the motion "that the Bill be now read a second time" (or sometimes on a wrecking amendment to that motion).

If the motion is carried, the bill is then sent either to a standing committee or to a Committee of the Whole House, where it is considered and voted on clause by clause.

=== United States ===
In the United States Senate, a bill is either referred to committee or placed on the Calendar of Business after second reading. No vote is held on whether to read the bill a second time. In U.S. legislatures where consideration in committee precedes second reading, the procedure varies as to how a bill reaches second reading. In Illinois, for example, legislation is automatically read a second time, after which amendments are in order.

== Third reading ==
A third reading is the stage of a legislative process in which a bill is read with all amendments and given final approval by a legislative body.

In legislatures whose procedures are based on those of the Westminster system, the third reading occurs after the bill has been amended by committee and considered for amendment at report stage (or, in Israel's case, second reading).

In most bicameral legislatures, a bill must separately pass the third reading in both chambers. Once that happens, it is sent on for promulgation, such as royal assent in the Westminster system or signing by the president or governor in the U.S. model.

In some bicameral legislatures, such as the Parliament of Poland or of the Czech Republic, a bill must pass three readings in the lower house, but only one reading in the upper house, at which the bill may be passed unchanged, amended, or rejected; and if the bill is not passed unchanged by the upper house, it is returned to the lower house, which may impose its original version by a supermajority, and is sent to promulgation after passing both chambers. This "imperfect" procedure requires that all bills must be introduced to the lower house, although this may be mitigated by giving the upper house the right to submit bills to the lower.

In a unicameral legislature, after passing the third reading in the sole chamber, the bill goes on directly for promulgation.

=== Hong Kong ===
In the Legislative Council of Hong Kong, after a bill has passed the second reading, the council will then sit as a "Committee of the whole Council", during which the Committee will further examine the clauses of the bill and make relevant amendments. After the bill has passed through the committee it is reported back to the council for it to vote on for the third reading. The resumption of the second reading debate and the third reading usually take place at the same council meeting.

The bill becomes an ordinance enacted by the Legislative Council upon the passage of the three readings. The ordinance will then take effect upon assent given by the Chief Executive and publication in the gazette. Acts are published in the Legal Supplement No. 1 of the gazette. If the ordinance or sections of the ordinance does not immediately take place, its commencement date will be published in Legal Supplement No. 2 of the gazette.

=== Republic of Ireland ===
In the Oireachtas of Ireland, the equivalent of the third reading is referred to as the "fifth stage" or "final stage". The motion is "That the Bill do now pass", except that the Seanad motion for a money bill is "That the Bill be returned to the Dáil". When a bill passes one house, it is sent to the other house and enters at second stage. After both houses have passed the bill, it is sent to the President of Ireland to be signed into law.

=== Poland ===
In the Polish Sejm, the third reading comprises a presentation of the amendments passed in second reading (or of a second committee report on the bill that was returned to committee after second reading), and a voting sequence: first on a motion to reject the bill (if one is introduced), then on the amendments introduced in second reading, and a final vote on the bill as amended.

=== United Kingdom ===
In both Houses of the British Parliament, after a bill has been reported from the committee to which it was assigned, consideration of the proposal moves to the so-called "Report Stage", during which further amendments may be tabled and voted on. After Report Stage has ended, a debate is held on the final bill, as amended, followed by a vote on the motion "That the Bill be now read a third time". If the motion is carried, the bill is passed.

== See also ==
- Acts of Parliament in the United Kingdom § Stages of a bill
- Bill (law)
- Parliamentary procedure
- Separation of powers
