= Federalist No. 60 =

Federalist Paper by Alexander Hamilton

- Alexander Hamilton, author of Federalist No. 60
- Author: Alexander Hamilton
- Original title: The Same Subject Continued: Concerning the Power of Congress to Regulate the Election of Members
- Language: English
- Series: The Federalist
- Publisher: The Independent Journal
- Publication date: February 23, 1788
- Publication place: United States
- Media type: Newspaper
- Preceded by: Federalist No. 59
- Followed by: Federalist No. 61

Federalist No. 60 is an essay by Alexander Hamilton, the sixtieth of The Federalist Papers. It was first published by The Independent Journal on February 23, 1788, under the pseudonym Publius, the name under which all The Federalist papers were published. This is the second of three papers discussing the power of Congress over the election of its own members. It is titled "The Same Subject Continued: Concerning the Power of Congress to Regulate the Election of Members".

In this paper, Hamilton addresses the concern that leaving the regulation of elections to the Union may favor only an elite, small class of people.
