= Origination Clause =

Clause of the United States Constitution

The Origination Clause, sometimes called the Revenue Clause, is Article I, Section 7, Clause 1 of the U.S. Constitution. The clause says that all bills for raising revenue must start in the U.S. House of Representatives, but the U.S. Senate may propose or concur with amendments, as in the case of other bills.

The Origination Clause stemmed from a British parliamentary practice that all money bills must have their first reading and any other initial readings in the House of Commons before they are sent to the House of Lords. The practice was intended to ensure that the power of the purse is possessed by the legislative body most responsive to the people, but the British practice was modified in America by allowing the Senate to amend these bills.

This clause was part of the Great Compromise between small and large states. The large states were unhappy with the lopsided power of small states in the Senate and so the Origination Clause theoretically offsets the unrepresentative nature of the Senate by compensating the large states for allowing equal voting rights to senators from small states.

== Text ==
The clause reads as follows:

All Bills for raising Revenue shall originate in the House of Representatives; but the Senate may propose or concur with Amendments as on other Bills.

== Background ==
The U.S. Constitution was written in 1787 and adopted in 1789. Several state constitutions followed British practice by providing that "money bills" must start in the more representative branch of the state legislature.

Vesting the power of origination in the House of Representatives was part of the Great Compromise in which the framers also agreed to allow equality in the Senate, regardless of a state's population, and to allow representation in the House based on a state's population. The framers adopted the Great Compromise on July 16, 1787. The draft clause then stated that "all bills for raising or appropriating money.... shall originate in the [representative house], and shall not be altered or amended by the [other house]. ... "

The Origination Clause was modified later in 1787 to reduce the House's power by allowing the Senate to amend revenue bills and by removing appropriation bills from the scope of the clause (the House and Senate have disagreed on the latter point). However, a proposal was defeated that would have reduced the House's power even more by changing "bills for raising revenue" to "bills for raising money for the purpose of revenue." James Madison explained:

In many acts, particularly in the regulations of trade, the object would be twofold. The raising of revenue would be one of them. How could it be determined which was the primary or predominant one; or whether it was necessary that revenue shd: be the sole object, in exclusion even of other incidental effects.

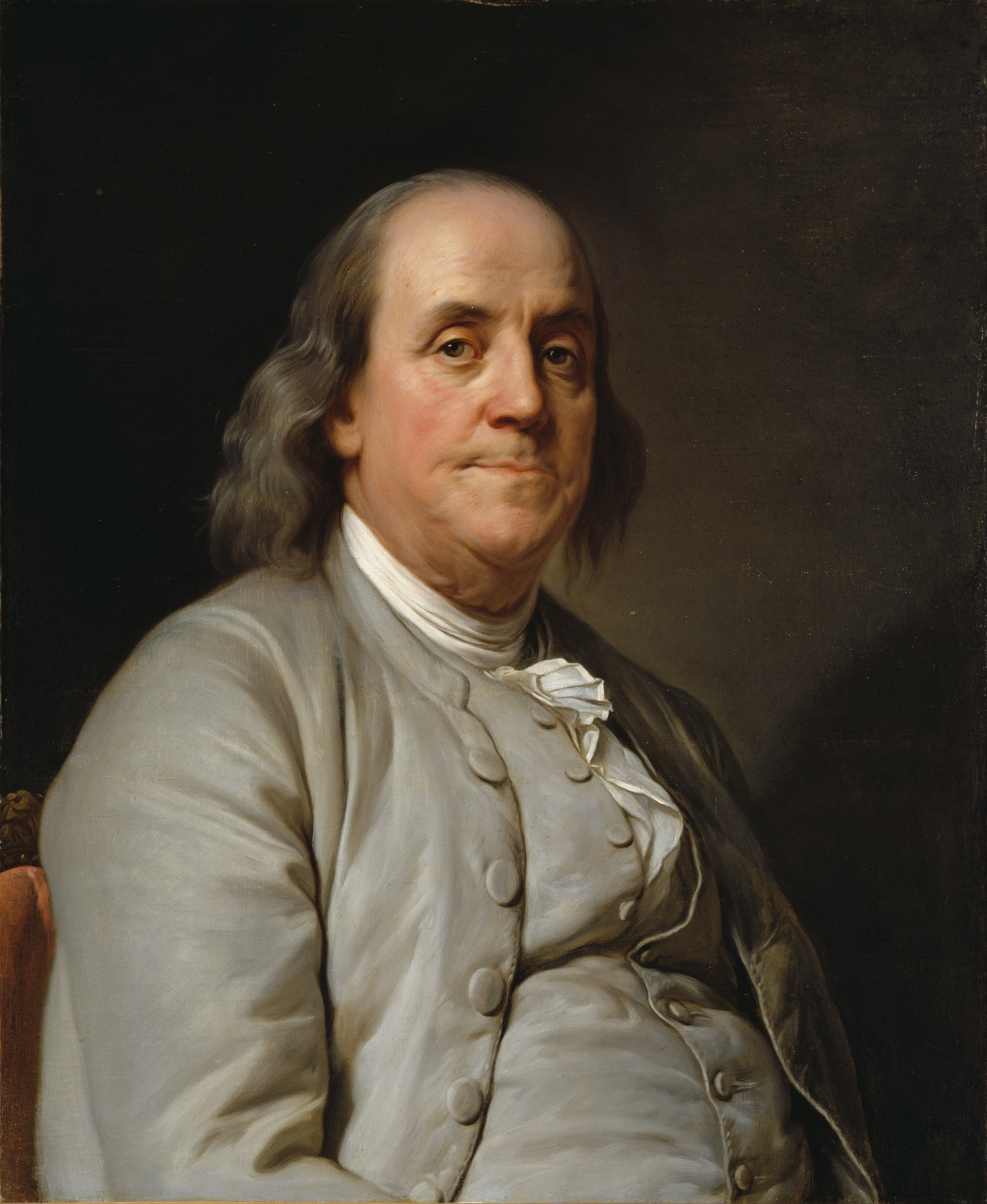
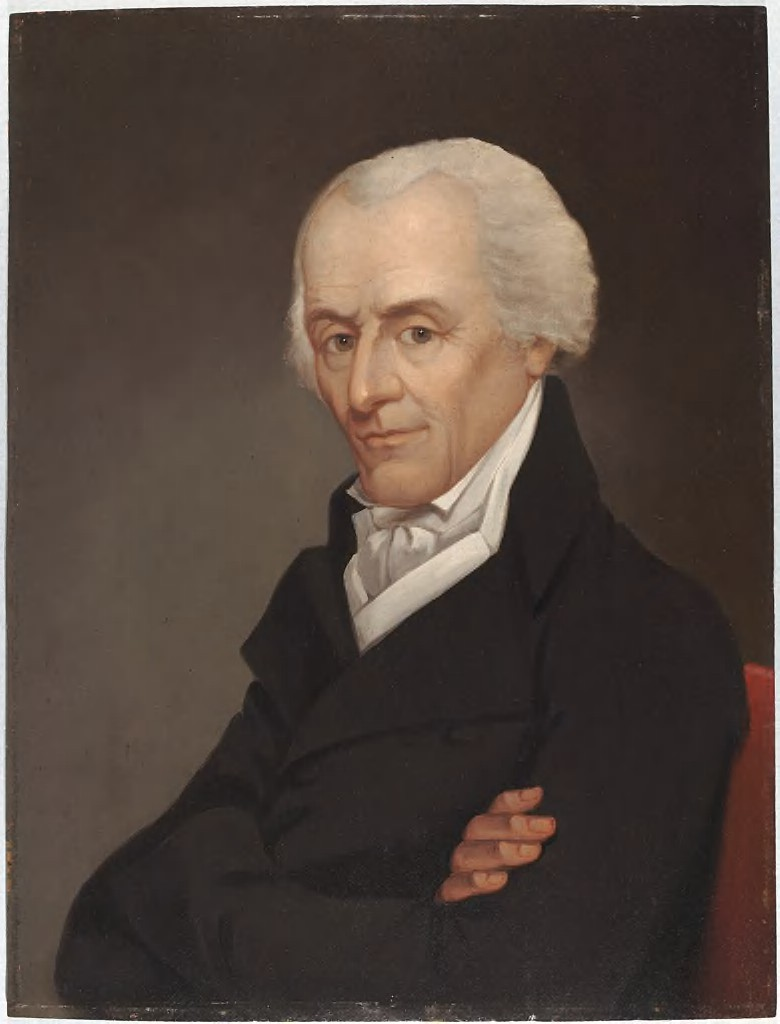
Ben Franklin (left) and Elbridge Gerry urged adoption of an origination clause.
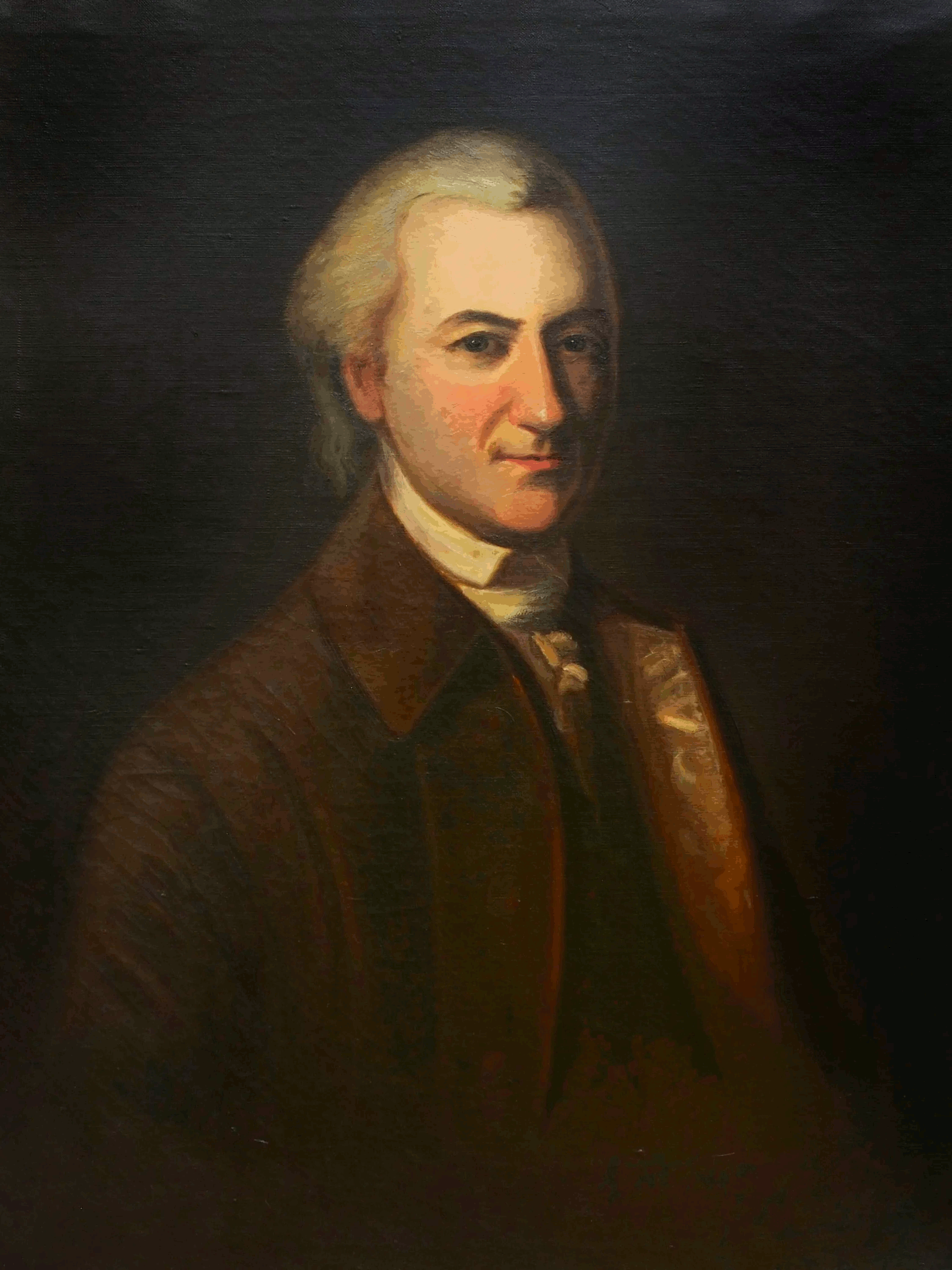
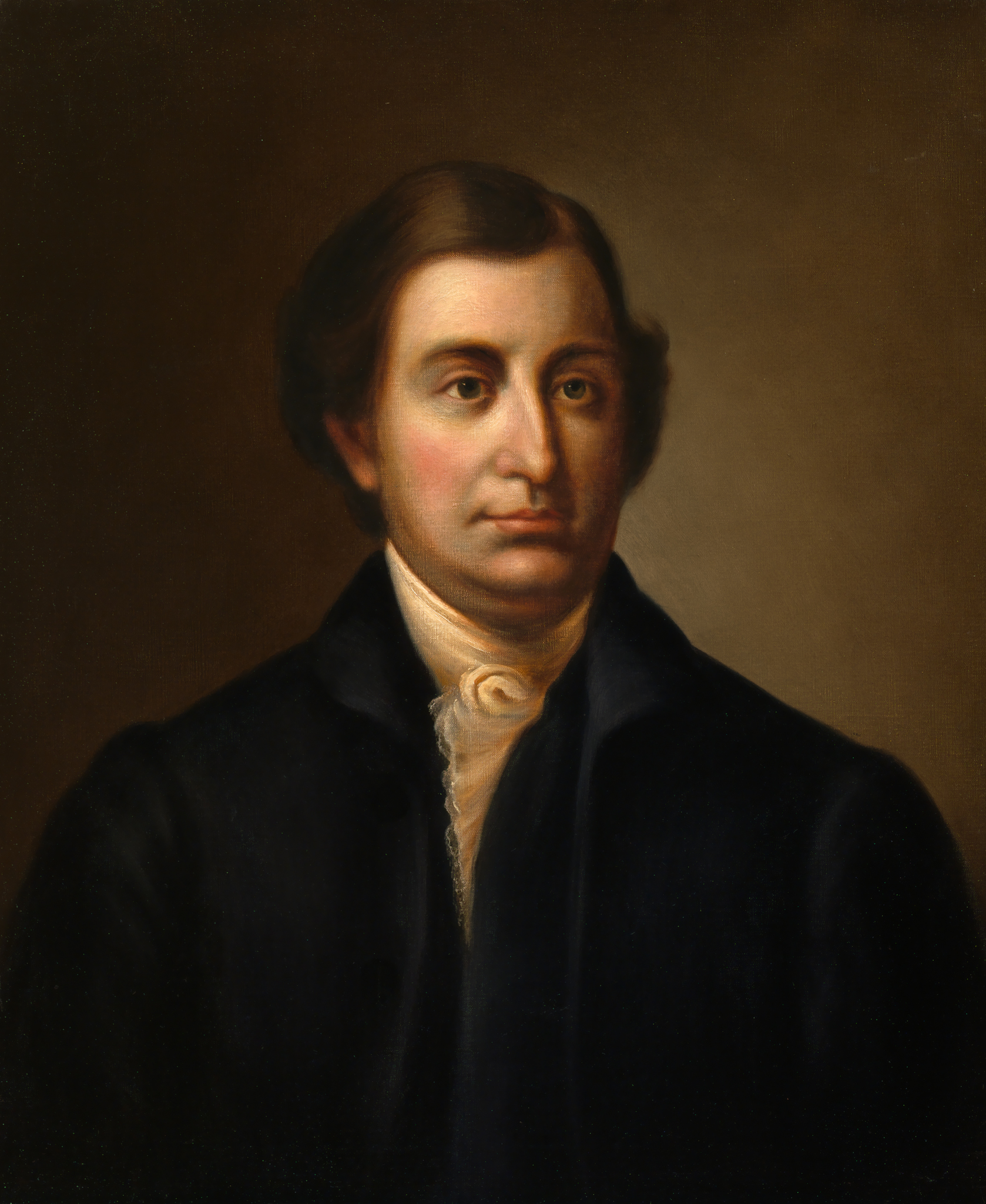
John Dickinson (left) and Edmund Randolph joined Franklin and George Mason to urge reinsertion of the clause.

Regarding the decision to allow Senate amendments, some of the reasoning was given by Theophilus Parsons during the convention in Massachusetts that ratified the Constitution. He said that otherwise, "representatives might tack any foreign matter to a money-bill, and compel the Senate to concur or lose the supplies." Madison believed that the difference between a permissible Senate amendment and an impermissible Senate amendment would "turn on the degree of connection between the matter & object of the bill and the alteration or amendment offered to it."

The Continental Congress then had a rule: "No new motion or proposition shall be admitted under color of amendment as a substitute for a question or proposition under debate until it is postponed or disagreed to." At the Virginia convention to ratify the Constitution, the delegate William Grayson was concerned that a substitute amendment could have the same effect as an origination: "the Senate could strike out every word of the bill except the word whereas, or any other introductory word, and might substitute new words of their own." Grayson was not convinced by Madison's argument that "the first part of the clause is sufficiently expressed to exclude all doubts" about where the origination must occur.

In its final form, the Origination Clause was a major selling point for the ratification of the Constitution. James Madison, who supported the final version during and after the 1787 Convention, wrote the following in Federalist 58 while the debate over ratification raged:

The house of representatives can not only refuse, but they alone can propose the supplies requisite for the support of government. They in a word hold the purse; that powerful instrument by which we behold, in the history of the British constitution, an infant and humble representation of the people, gradually enlarging the sphere of its activity and importance, and finally reducing, as far as it seems to have wished, all the overgrown prerogatives of the other branches of the government. This power over the purse, may in fact be regarded as the most compleat and effectual weapon with which any constitution can arm the immediate representatives of the people, for obtaining a redress of every grievance, and for carrying into effect every just and salutary measure.

The clause resonated with a citizenry opposed to taxation without representation.

== Developments since 1789 ==
Many scholars have written about the Origination Clause. Among the most widely influential was Joseph Story, who wrote in 1833 that the clause refers only to bills that levy taxes:

[The clause] has been confined to bills to levy taxes in the strict sense of the words, and has not been understood to extend to bills for other purposes, which may incidentally create revenue. No one supposes, that a bill to sell any of the public lands, or to sell public stock, is a bill to raise revenue, in the sense of the constitution. Much less would a bill be so deemed, which merely regulated the value of foreign or domestic coins, or authorized a discharge of insolvent debtors upon assignments of their estates to the United States, giving a priority of payment to the United States in cases of insolvency, although all of them might incidentally bring, revenue into the treasury.

The U.S. Supreme Court has decided several cases involving this clause, and all of those challenges to federal statutes failed. For example, in the 1911 case of Flint v. Stone Tracy Company, the Court held, "The amendment was germane to the subject-matter of the bill and not beyond the power of the Senate to propose." However, the plaintiffs in one lower court decision succeeded in striking down a federal statute on Origination Clause grounds. The Supreme Court stated in the 1990 case of United States v. Munoz-Flores:

Both parties agree that "revenue bills are those that levy taxes in the strict sense of the word, and are not bills for other purposes which may incidentally create revenue." Twin City Bank v. Nebeker, 167 U. S. 196, 202 (1897) (citing 1 J. Story, Commentaries on the Constitution § 880, pp. 610–611 (3d ed. 1858)). The Court has interpreted this general rule to mean that a statute that creates a particular governmental program and that raises revenue to support that program, as opposed to a statute that raises revenue to support Government generally, is not a "Bil[l] for raising Revenue" within the meaning of the Origination Clause.

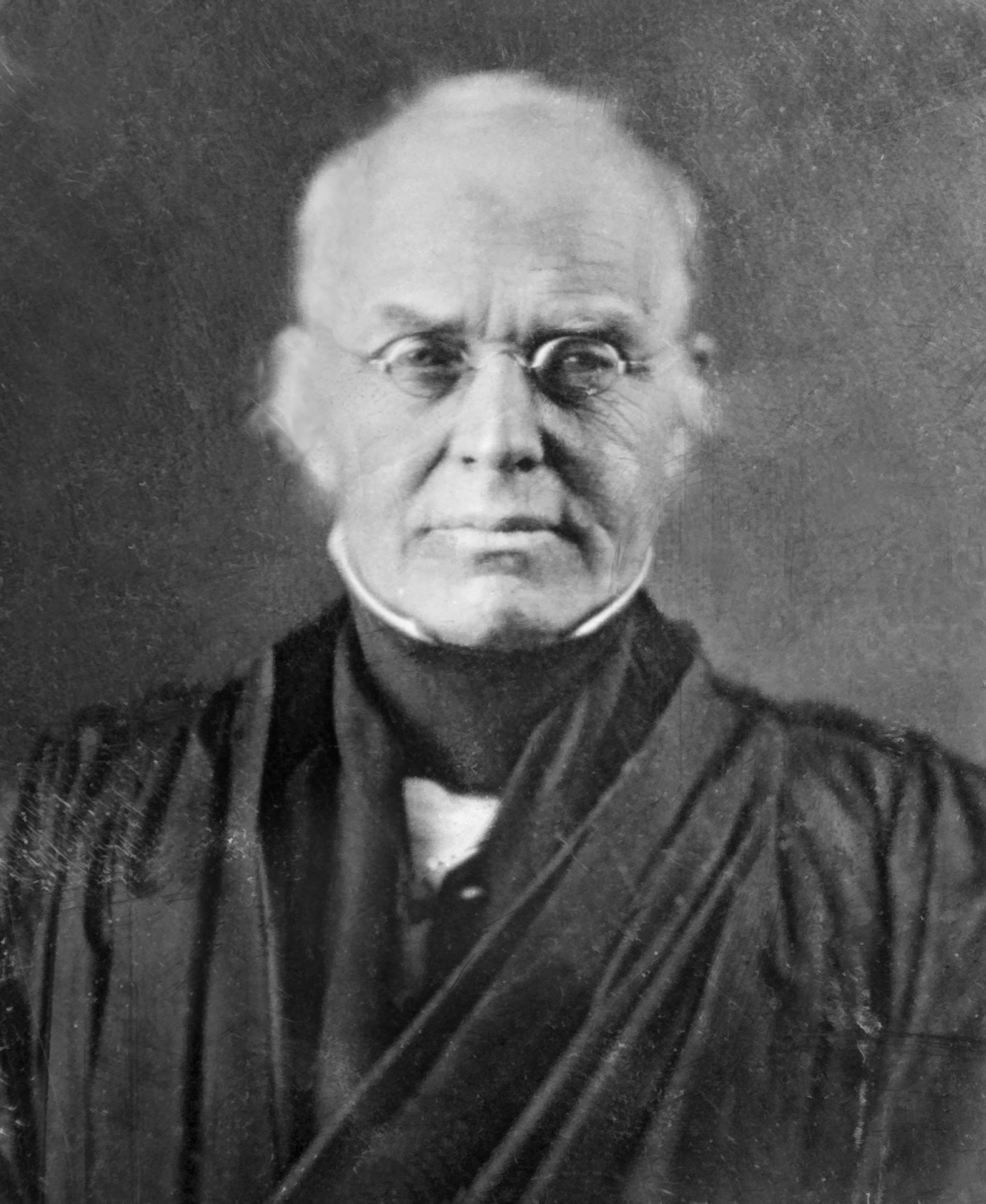
Justice Joseph Story

What this means exactly is disputed. According to one scholar, a statute is outside the scope of the Origination Clause if it "imposes an exaction not to raise revenue, but to enforce a statute passed under the Commerce Clause or other enumerated power." However, according to another scholar, even exactions imposed only under the taxing powers of Congress are outside the scope of the Origination Clause if Congress "earmarks revenues to fund a program it creates." Regarding the latter view, Justice John Paul Stevens suggested in 1990 that its tendency was to "convert the Origination Clause into a formal accounting requirement.... "

A bill that lowers taxes instead of raises taxes may still be a bill for raising revenue, according to the United States Court of Appeals for the Ninth Circuit. Assuming that a bill is for raising revenue, a further ambiguity in the clause involves how far the Senate's right to amend extends. According to law professor Jack Balkin, the Senate may take a House-originated revenue bill and "substitute a different bill on a different subject." On the other hand, law professor Randy Barnett wrote, "The Supreme Court has never approved the 'strike-and-replace' procedure.... "

Not only the House of Representatives but also the Senate and the judiciary have sometimes tried to guard the role of the House with regard to origination of revenue bills. For example, as early as 1789, the Senate deemed itself helpless to pass a law levying a tax. As mentioned, a federal court in 1915 struck down legislation contrary to the clause. The U.S. Supreme Court has expressed willingness to address such issues, according to its 1990 opinion by Justice Thurgood Marshall in Munoz-Flores:

A law passed in violation of the Origination Clause would thus be no more immune from judicial scrutiny because it was passed by both Houses and signed by the President than would be a law passed in violation of the First Amendment.

In 2012, the joint dissent in the U.S. Supreme Court case National Federation of Independent Business v. Sebelius mentioned that "the Constitution requires tax increases to originate in the House of Representatives" per the Origination Clause, though that issue was not addressed by the majority opinion. In 2014, Sissel v. U.S. Department of Health and Human Services, a challenge to the Affordable Care Act brought by the Pacific Legal Foundation based upon the clause was rejected by a panel of the United States Court of Appeals for the District of Columbia, and that court later declined a request to put the matter before all of its judges ("en banc") over a lengthy dissent authored by Judge Brett Kavanaugh.

In 2013, during the United States federal government shutdown of 2013 and the United States debt-ceiling crisis of 2013, the Republican-led House of Representatives could not agree on or pass an originating resolution to end the government crisis, as had been agreed, and so the Democratic-led Senate used Bill H.R. 2775 to resolve the impasse by using the Continuing Appropriations Act, 2014, an insignificant bill that had originated in the House, which the Senate amended all the tax and appropriation measures to satisfy the formal requirements of the Originating Clause.

== See also ==
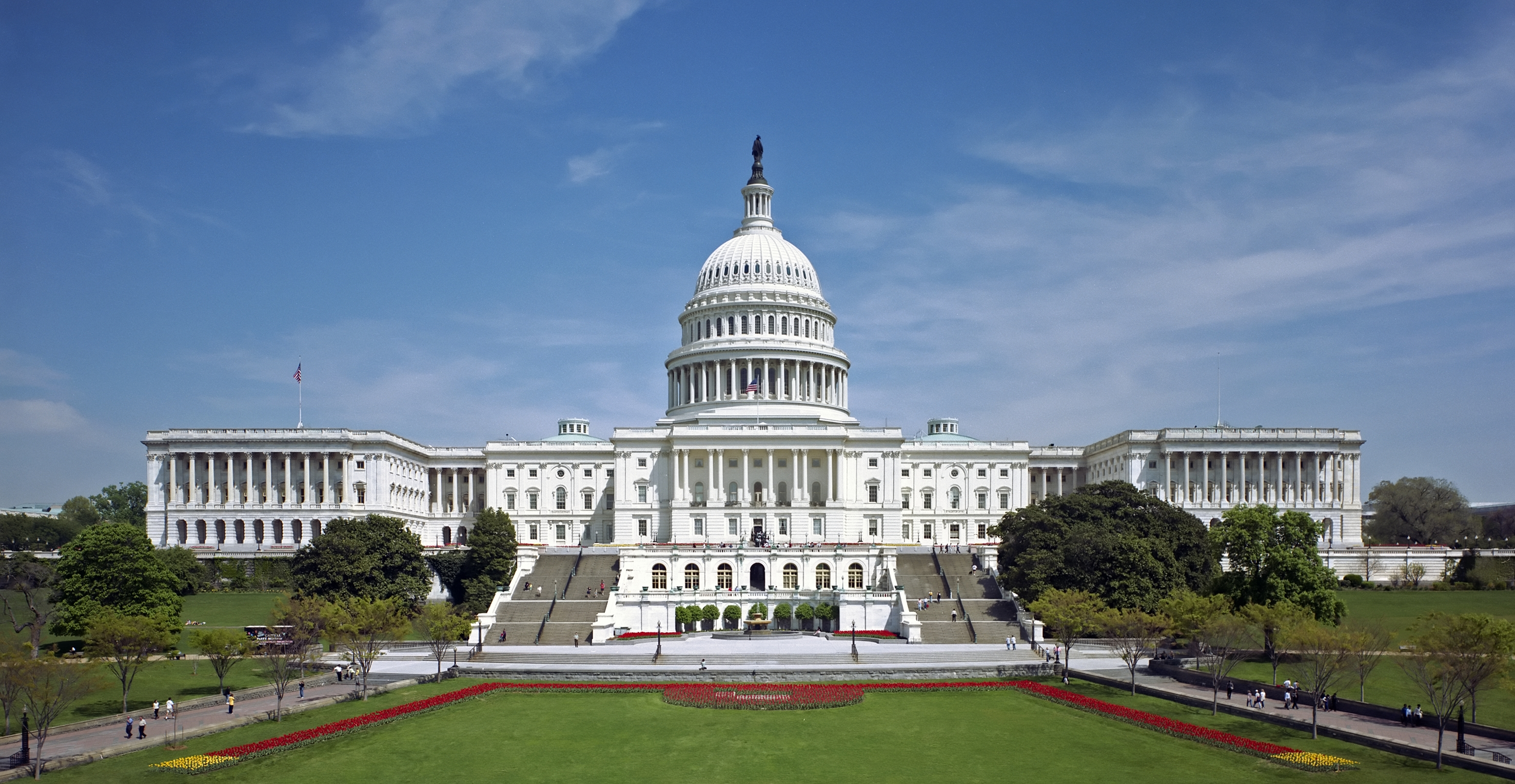
Revenue-raising bills must have started in the House (right) and moved to the Senate (left).

- Article One of the United States Constitution (where the Origination Clause is located)
- Blue slip (when the House protests on Origination Clause grounds)
- Taxing and Spending Clause (authorizes Congress to levy taxes)
- Sixteenth Amendment (expands ability of Congress to levy taxes)
- Seventeenth Amendment (provides for direct election of two senators for each state)
- Shell bill (legislative maneuver)
- Substitute amendment (legislative maneuver)
