= Federalist No. 57 =

Federalist Paper by James Madison

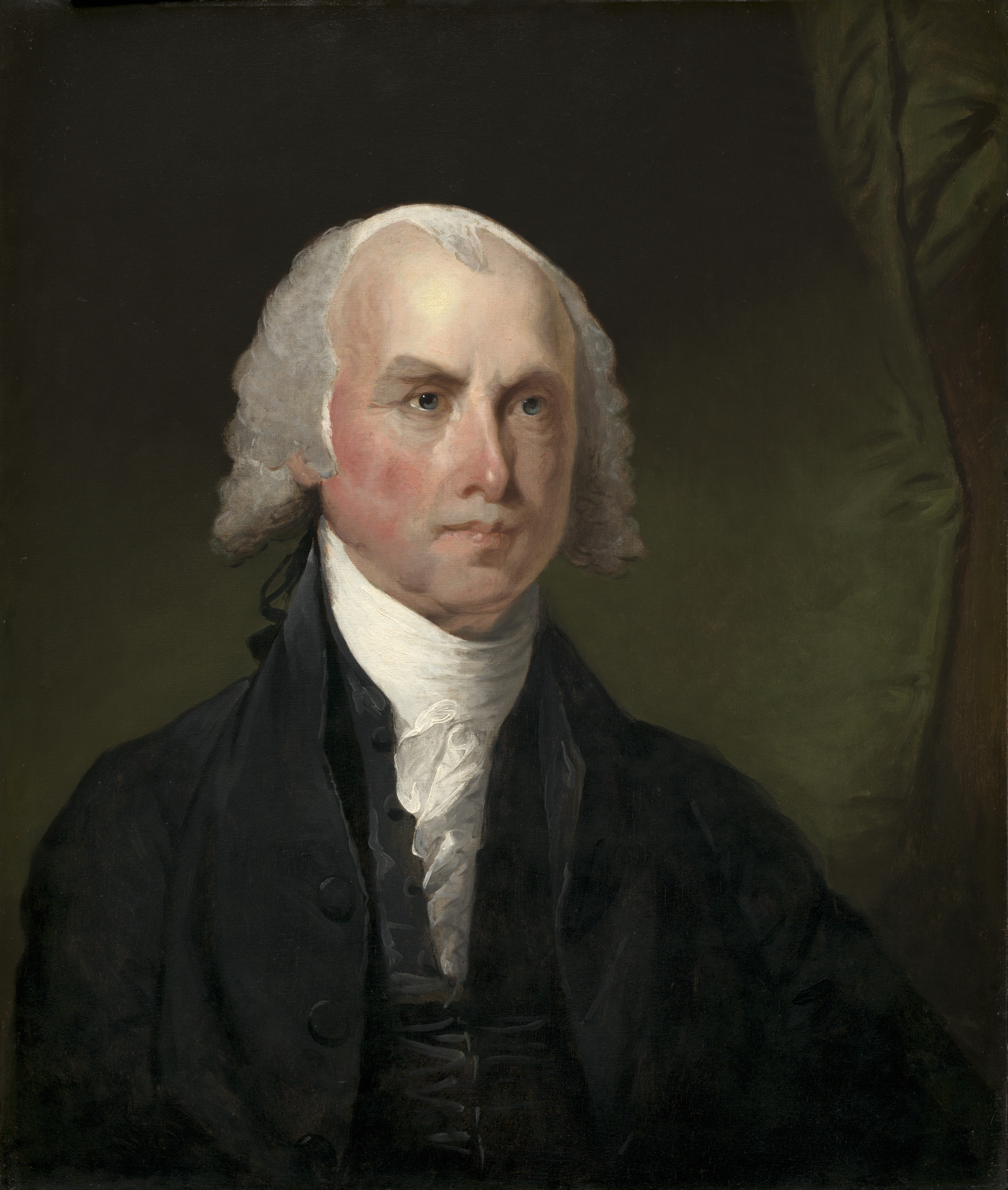
- James Madison, author of Federalist No. 57
- Author: James Madison
- Original title: The Alleged Tendency of the New Plan to Elevate the Few at the Expense of the Many
- Language: English
- Series: The Federalist
- Publisher: New York Packet
- Publication date: February 8, 1788
- Publication place: United States
- Media type: Newspaper
- Preceded by: Federalist No. 56
- Followed by: Federalist No. 58

Federalist No. 57 is an essay by James Madison, the fifty-seventh of The Federalist Papers. It was first published by The New York Packet on February 19, 1788, under the pseudonym Publius, the name under which all The Federalist papers were published. It is titled "The Alleged Tendency of the New Plan to Elevate the Few at the Expense of the Many".

The central criticism Madison refutes in the essay is that the House of Representatives will comprise legislators having the "least sympathy with the mass of the people," and that they will be likely to coalesce in the "ambitious sacrifice of the many to the aggrandizement of the few."

Reassuring the reader first of the general properties of republics which prevent tyranny, namely elections and term limits for people in a public trust, he moves more specifically to the safeguards present in the United States Constitution for that purpose. Drawing on the meritocratic benefits of the popular mode of election for representatives in the House, Madison guarantees the election of "men who possess most wisdom to discern, and ... pursue, the common good of the society."

So long as the representatives are elected by the "free suffrages of their fellow-citizens," Madison stipulates, there are five reasons they will remain faithful to their constituents: first, the people chose these men to uphold their engagements, so the representatives have an obligation to stand by their words. Second, the representatives, sensing a mark of honor and gratitude, feel at least some affection to these constituents. Third, selfish motives of human nature bind the representative to his constituents because the delegates hope to seek advancement from his followers rather than the government. Fourth, frequent elections remind the representatives that they are dependent on the constituents for their loyalty and support. Therefore, the representatives are compelled to remain faithful to their constituents. Finally, the laws created by the legislators will apply to all members of society, including the legislators themselves.

Lastly, Madison addresses the criticism that departing from the limited number of a few hundred electors in the present state constitutions to thousands of electors in a federal system is bound to elect untrustworthy representatives. To the contrary, Madison reasons, hearkening back to Federalist No. 10, a greater number of electors is more likely to elect a "fit representative" than a small one.

Moreover, he questions the practicality of a small pool of electors logistically, and ends citing examples in contemporary state constitutions of large bodies of voters which nevertheless elect fit representatives. For example, the mode of senatorial election in New Hampshire, whose "districts ... are nearly as large as will be necessary for her representatives in the [proposed] Congress," and those of Massachusetts, whose districts are even larger than those which the new Constitution would demand.
