= Money bill =

Legislative concept

In the Westminster system (and, colloquially, in the United States), a money bill or supply bill is a bill that solely concerns taxation or government spending (also known as appropriation of money), as opposed to changes in public law.

== Conventions ==
It is often a constitutional convention that the upper house may not block a money bill. There is often another requirement that non-money bill-type clauses may not be attached to a money bill. The rationale behind this convention is that the upper house, being appointed or indirectly elected, should not have any right to decide on taxation and public expenditure-related policies as may be framed by the directly elected representatives of the lower house. Therefore, money bills are an exception to the general rule that for a bill to be enacted into a law, it has to be approved by both the lower and upper Houses of Parliament.

Loss of supply in the lower house is conventionally considered to be an expression of the house's loss of confidence in the government, resulting in the government's fall.

== Requirements in Westminster systems ==
=== Australia ===
A supply bill in the Australian system is required to pass the House of Representatives, the Senate and be signed by the Governor-General. The Senate has no power or ability to introduce or modify a supply bill, but has the ability to block or defer the passing of a supply bill, and can request the House of Representatives to modify the bill. The most famous instance where supply was blocked was during the 1975 constitutional crisis. This has resulted in agreements between political parties to prevent the blockage of supply bills through the Senate.

=== Bangladesh ===
A money bill is specifically defined by Article 81 of the Constitution of Bangladesh. The President of Bangladesh can send back all bills passed by the Parliament for a review except a money bill. However, a money bill can be introduced to the Parliament only at the President's recommendation. Additionally, tax can only be levied by the Parliament.

=== Canada ===
Although Parliament may pass money bills, under section 54 of the Constitution Act, 1867, funds can be appropriated only on the recommendation of the Governor General. This has resulted in the convention that only ministers introduce money bills.

=== India ===
Procedure for a Money Bill:

1. Money Bills can be introduced only in Lok Sabha (lower House), by ministers as well as private members.
2. Money bills passed by the Lok Sabha are sent to the Rajya Sabha (upper house). The Rajya Sabha may not amend money bills but can recommend amendments. To make sure that Rajya Sabha does not amend the bill by adding some non-money matters (known as a Financial Bill), the Speaker of the Lok Sabha certifies the bill as a money bill before sending it to the upper house, and the decision of the Speaker is binding on both the Houses. A money bill must be returned to the Lok Sabha within 14 days, or the bill is deemed to have passed both houses in the form it was originally passed by the Lok Sabha.
3. When a Money Bill is returned to the Lok Sabha with the recommended amendments of the Rajya Sabha, it is open to the Lok Sabha to accept or reject any or all of the recommendations.
4. A money bill is deemed to have passed both houses with any recommended amendments the Lok Sabha chooses to accept, and without any that it chooses to decline.
5. The definition of "Money Bill" is given in Article 110 of The Constitution of India. A financial bill is not a Money Bill unless it fulfills the requirements of Article 110.
6. The Speaker of the Lok Sabha certifies whether a financial bill is a Money Bill or not.
7. A policy cut motion expresses disapproval of the given policy. Symbolically, the members demand that the amount of the demand be reduced to ₹1. They may also suggest an alternative policy.
8. An economy cut motion demands that the amount of the policy be reduced by a specified amount.
9. A token cut motion is used to show a specific grievance against the government. It also states that the amount of the demand be reduced by ₹100.
10. A money bill can only be introduced in parliament with prior permission of the President of India (Article 117).
11. A finance bill is supposed to be enacted within 75 days (including the Parliament voting and the President assenting).
12. A money bill cannot be returned by the President to the parliament for its reconsideration, as it is presented in the Lok Sabha with his permission.

The concept of money bills in India came to the forefront during the enactment of the Aadhar Act, 2016. In spite of resistance by the opposition, the Aadhaar Bill was certified as a 'money bill' by the Speaker of the Lower House. The Upper House proposed certain amendments, but ultimately the BJP-dominated Lower House rejected the amendments suggested by the Upper House and unilaterally enacted the Aadhar Act, 2016. Immediately thereafter, Jairam Ramesh, a senior Congress leader, challenged the speaker's decision to treat the Aadhar Bill as a 'money bill' before the Supreme Court of India. Article 110(3) of the Constitution of India categorically states that "if any question arises whether a Bill is a Money Bill or not, the decision of the Speaker of the House of the People thereon shall be final". Therefore, one of the prime constitutional questions before the Supreme Court is whether it can review the speaker's certificate classifying a bill as a 'money bill'. In three prior cases, the Supreme Court of India has refused to review the Speaker's certificate. However, some commentators have argued that the Court's earlier judgements were incorrect and Article 110(3) made the Speaker's decision "final" for the purpose of the two Houses of the Parliament, not for the Supreme Court of India. This argument is further supported by the fact that in Kihoto Hollohan vs Zachillhu (AIR 1993 SC 412), the "final" decision of the speaker regarding disqualification of members of the House under the Tenth Schedule of the Indian Constitution was held to be a judicial decision subject to judicial review. This suggests that the "final" status given by the Indian constitution does not automatically render the Indian speaker's decision or certificate immune from judicial review. In view of this crucial constitutional question, it has been suggested that the Supreme Court in Jairam Ramesh v. Union of India should create a constitution bench of at least nine judges to settle the law on this issue. The five judge bench decided that the Aadhar Bill was a Money Bill by a vote of 4–1.

=== Ireland ===
The 1937 Constitution of Ireland defines a money bill (Irish: bille airgid) as one concerning only specified financial matters. The Seanad (upper house of the Oireachtas or parliament) has restricted powers over money bills, and the "only" restriction prevents the Government from tacking onto a money bill some non-financial provision which it would like to bypass Seanad scrutiny. The specified financial matters are any of the following:

the imposition, repeal, remission, alteration or regulation of taxation; the imposition for the payment of debt or other financial purposes of charges on public moneys or the variation or repeal of any such charges; supply; the appropriation, receipt, custody, issue or audit of accounts of public money; the raising or guarantee of any loan or the repayment thereof

The specification is based on that in the UK's Parliament Act 1911. There is an exclusion for revenue and spending by local authorities. The main annual money bills are the Finance Bill for implementing the budget and the Appropriation Bill for implementing the estimates. The Constitution requires all appropriation of public funds to be pre-approved by the Government in the form of a "money message" signed by the Taoiseach. Thus, if a bill extends the powers of a Department of state, it is not a money bill, but if it also imposes a new charge on the public, it still requires a money message.

In the Oireachtas, money bills must be introduced in the Dáil (lower house). The Seanad has 90 days to process other Dáil bills but only 21 days for a money bill; it cannot amend the bill but only recommend amendments for the Dáil to accept or reject. The President's power under Article 26 to refer bills to the Supreme Court does not apply to money bills. The Ceann Comhairle (Dáil speaker) certifies whether a new bill is a money bill. There is no judicial review of the Ceann Comhairle's ruling; if the Seanad disagrees with it, the President may establish a Committee of Privileges to adjudicate, with equal membership from both houses and chaired by a Supreme Court judge. No such committee has been established under the 1937 constitution, but one was established for a 1935 bill under the 1922 Constitution of the Irish Free State, which contained similar provisions until the 1936 abolition of the Free State Seanad made the distinction of money bills moot since they were henceforth treated the same as other bills.

=== United Kingdom ===
In the United Kingdom, section 1(1) of the Parliament Act 1911 provides that the House of Lords may not delay a money bill more than a month. It is at the discretion of the Speaker of the House of Commons to certify which bills are money bills, and his decision is final and is not subject to challenge. Section 1(2) of the Act states:

A Money Bill means a Public Bill which in the opinion of the Speaker of the House of Commons contains only provisions dealing with all or any of the following subjects, namely, the imposition, repeal, remission, alteration, or regulation of taxation; the imposition for the payment of debt or other financial purposes of charges on the Consolidated Fund, the National Loans Fund or on money provided by Parliament, or the variation or repeal of any such charges; supply; the appropriation, receipt, custody, issue or audit of accounts of public money; the raising or guarantee of any loan or the repayment thereof; or subordinate matters incidental to those subjects or any of them. In this subsection the expressions "taxation," "public money," and "loan" respectively do not include any taxation, money, or loan raised by local authorities or bodies for local purposes.

The Parliament Act 1911 was the product of the political crisis of 1909. The People's Budget of 1909 proposed by the House of Commons was rejected by the House of Lords. A government whose budget (that is the Finance Bill) is rejected can only resign or dissolve Parliament (precipitating a general election), because without money it is impossible to govern. The rejection of the Finance Bill in 1909 by the Lords prompted the then British government to initiate steps to curtail the powers of the House of Lords in this regard. This is evident from the long title of the 1911 Act, which begins: "An Act to make provision with respect to the powers of the House of Lords in relation to those of the House of Commons ...".

The reference to the National Loans Fund was inserted on 1 April 1968 by section 1(5) of the National Loans Act 1968.

For this purpose, the expression "Public Bill" does not include any bill for confirming a provisional order.

Bradley and Ewing said that the statutory definition of "Money Bill" is "strictly interpreted". Most annual Finance Bills have not been certified to be money bills.

The Parliament Act permits the House of Lords to introduce money bills. Nonetheless, it is a constitutional convention, dating to the late 17th century, that supply bills must originate in the Commons. Standing Order 50 of the House of Commons requires money bills to be introduced by a minister of the Crown. Standing Order 78(3) directs the Speaker to reject without debate ("deem[] to have been disagreed to") any House of Lords amendment to a bill that would impose a charge on the public revenue.

== Requirements in non-Westminster systems ==
=== United States ===
While the United States of America is not a parliamentary democracy, the Origination Clause of the U.S. Constitution requires that all bills raising revenue originate in the House of Representatives, consistent with British constitutional practice; by convention, appropriation bills (bills that spend money) also originate in the House. Unlike in most Westminster systems, there are no limits on the Senate's ability to amend revenue bills or any requirement for the Senate to approve such bills within a certain timeframe. Both appropriations and revenue bills are often referred to as money bills to contrast them with authorization bills. The U.S. Supreme Court in United States v. Munoz-Flores (1990) held that: "A law passed in violation of the Origination Clause would thus be no more immune from judicial scrutiny because it was passed by both Houses and signed by the President than would be a law passed in violation of the First Amendment".

== See also ==
- Appropriation bill
- Power of the purse

== Sources ==
- Bradley, A W; Ewing, K D (1997). Constitutional and Administrative Law (12th ed.). Longman.
- "Constitution of Ireland". Irish Statute Book. Attorney-General of Ireland. January 2020.
- Datta, Pratik; Malhotra, Shefali; Tyagi, Shivangi. "Judicial Review and Money Bills" (PDF). National Institute of Public Finance and Policy. Working paper No. 192.
- Government Accounting Unit (19 April 2022). "Public Financial Procedures". Dublin: Department of Public Expenditure, NDP Delivery and Reform.
