= Flint v. Stone Tracy Co. =

- Supreme Court of the United States

Argued March 17–18, 1910 Reargued January 17–19, 1911 Decided March 13, 1911
- Full case name: Stella P. Flint, as General Guardian of the Property of Samuel N. Stone, Junior, a Minor, Appt. v. Stone Tracy Company, et al.
- Citations: 220 U.S. 107 (more) 31 S. Ct. 342; 55 L. Ed. 389; 1911 U.S. LEXIS 1664

Holding
- The privilege of operating in corporate form is valuable and justifies imposition of an income tax.

Court membership
- Chief Justice Edward D. White Associate Justices John M. Harlan · Joseph McKenna; Oliver W. Holmes Jr. · William R. Day; Horace H. Lurton · Charles E. Hughes; Willis Van Devanter · Joseph R. Lamar

Case opinions
- Majority: Day, joined by White, McKenna, Holmes, Lurton, Hughes, Lamar.
- Dissent: Harlan, joined by Van Devanter

Flint v. Stone Tracy Co., 220 U.S. 107 (1911), was a United States Supreme Court case in which a taxpayer challenged the validity of a federal income tax on corporations. The privilege of incorporation is a state function, and the challengers argued that only the states should tax corporations. The Court ruled that the privilege of operating in corporate form is valuable and justifies imposition of a federal income tax:

The continuity of the business, without interruption by death or dissolution, the transfer of property interests by the disposition of shares of stock, the advantages of business controlled and managed by corporate directors, the general absence of individual liability, these and other things inhere in the advantages of business thus conducted, which do not exist when the same business is conducted by private individuals or partnerships.

== Background ==
President William Howard Taft proposed a constitutional amendment to allow federal income taxes on individuals and an excise tax "upon the privilege of doing business as an artificial entity and of freedom from a general partnership liability enjoyed by those who own the stock" on June 16, 1909. The Sixteenth Amendment to the United States Constitution, which permitted federal income taxation without apportionment, was enacted in 1913; and the Corporation Excise Tax Act, sometimes known as the Corporation Tax Act, was enacted on August 5, 1909 and taxed corporation income at 1%, with the first $5000 exempt.

Dictionaries often cite the case for the definition of excise tax in the United States:

Excises are 'taxes laid upon the manufacture, sale, or consumption of commodities within the country, upon licenses to pursue certain occupations, and upon corporate privileges.' Cooley, Const. Lim. 7th ed. 680.

The tax under consideration, as we have construed the statute, may be described as an excise upon the particular privilege of doing business in a corporate capacity, i. e., with the advantages which arise from corporate or quasi corporate organization; or, when applied to insurance companies, for doing the business of such companies. As was said in the Thomas Case, 192 U. S. supra, the requirement to pay such taxes involves the exercise of privileges, and the element of absolute and unavoidable demand is lacking. If business is not done in the manner described in the statute, no tax is payable.

== Constitutionality arguments ==
The New International Yearbook reported:

One of the chief arguments against the constitutionality presented in the public prints was that this is an excise tax on the privilege of doing business in the corporate form; this latter being a privilege derived by franchise from State authorities only, Congress can not impose a burden on it without invading the sovereignty of the States. President Taft in recommending the tax had stated that it is laid "upon the privilege of doing business as an artificial entity and the freedom from a general partnership liability enjoyed by those who own stock." While, therefore, it was argued, a tax on the business of a corporation might be constitutional, a tax on the franchise, that is, on the special privileges which the State confers upon the corporation, is an invasion of the State's rights.

According to the Tax History Project, "the tax was challenged on the theory that it was a direct tax that had not been apportioned among the states by population." The U.S. Constitution provides (in part):

The Congress shall have power To lay and collect Taxes, Duties, Imposts and Excises... but all Duties, Imposts and Excises shall be uniform throughout the United States.... Representatives and direct Taxes shall be apportioned among the several States which may be included within this Union, according to their respective Numbers.... No Capitation, or other direct, Tax shall be laid, unless in proportion to the Census or Enumeration herein before directed to be taken.

The power to impose taxes, whether direct or indirect, is granted by Article I, section 8, clause 1. Indirect taxes (or "duties, imposts and excises," sometimes called simply "excises") are required to be geographically uniform, according to Article I, section 8, clause 1.

Another issue raised in the case was whether section 38 of the Act in question was unconstitutional because it originated in the Senate, in violation of the Origination Clause, section 7 of article 1 of the Constitution, providing that "all bills for raising revenue shall originate in the House of Representatives, but the Senate may propose or concur with the amendments, as on other bills."

The Court rejected that argument, upholding the statute and ruling that the bill had indeed originated in the House of Representatives:

...the tariff bill of which the section under consideration is a part, originated in the House of Representatives, and was there a general bill for the collection of revenue. As originally introduced, it contained a plan of inheritance taxation. In the Senate the proposed tax was removed from the bill, and the corporation tax, in a measure, substituted therefor. The bill having properly originated in the House, we perceive no reason in the constitutional provision relied upon why it may not be amended in the Senate in the manner which it was in this case. The amendment was germane to the subject-matter of the bill, and not beyond the power of the Senate to propose.

== Criticism ==
Henry Campbell Black stated:

The tax laid by the act of 1909 was specifically denominated a "special excise tax" and was declared to be imposed "with respect to the carrying on or doing business by such corporation." This was in reality an income tax very thinly disguised, and restricted to corporations. But the theoretical distinction between a tax on income and a tax on the privilege of doing business in a corporate capacity, as measured by income, afforded sufficient ground for the courts to hold that it was not a direct tax and therefore not in conflict with the constitution.

== Similar cases ==
In Quaker City Cab. v. Pennsylvania, the Supreme Court held that the state of Pennsylvania could not discriminate between corporations and individuals and partnerships in imposing taxes on gross receipts of operators of taxicabs:

The equal protection clause does not detract from the right of the state justly to exert its taxing power or prevent it from adjusting its legislation to differences in situation or forbid classification in that connection, but it does require that the classification be not arbitrary, but based on a real and substantial difference having a reasonable relation to the subject of the particular legislation.

The vote was 6-3, and the dissent by Louis Brandeis cited Flint v. Stone Tracy Co.:

Why Pennsylvania should have chosen to impose upon corporations a heavier tax than upon individuals or partnerships engaged under like circumstances in the same line of business, or why it should have selected this particular form of tax as the means of doing so, we have no occasion to enquire. The state may have done this, because, in view of the advantages inherent in corporate organization, the Legislature believed that course necessary in order to insure a just distribution of the burdens of government. In Flint v. Stone Tracy Co., this court listed the advantages which justify the imposition of special taxes on corporations…

The Court, 45 years later, explicitly reversed the Quaker City Cab decision in upholding an Illinois property tax that was higher on corporations than individuals, and it quoted the dissenting opinion of Holmes in the taxicab case and the Flint v. Stone Tracy Co. case.

== See also ==
- List of United States Supreme Court cases, volume 220
- Payne–Aldrich Tariff Act
