= Hills & Co. v. Hoover =

- Supreme Court of the United States

Argued March 15–16, 1911 Decided April 3, 1911
- Full case name: Hills and Company, Limited v. Hoover
- Citations: 220 U.S. 329 (more) 31 S. Ct. 402; 55 L. Ed. 485

Holding
- The owner of a copyright is restricted to a single action against another to find, seize, and seek penalties for allegedly infringing copies of a work.

Court membership
- Chief Justice Edward D. White Associate Justices John M. Harlan · Joseph McKenna; Oliver W. Holmes Jr. · William R. Day; Horace H. Lurton · Charles E. Hughes; Willis Van Devanter · Joseph R. Lamar

Case opinion
- Majority: Day, joined by unanimous

Hills & Co. v. Hoover, 220 U.S. 329 (1911), was a United States Supreme Court case in which the Court held the owner of a copyright is restricted to a single action against another to find, seize, and seek penalties for allegedly infringing copies of a work.

== Background ==
Hills & Company, Limited, a British company, owned copyrights in engravings reproduced without permission by Joseph Hoover & Son. In December 1902, a deputy marshal seized 4,763 infringing copies and delivered them to Hills's agent. Hills then filed a separate lawsuit seeking a statutory penalty of $1 for each copy.

== Decision ==
The Court held that § 4965 of the Revised Statutes of the United States required seizure of the infringing copies and recovery of the monetary penalty to be pursued in a single action. Hills therefore could not maintain its separate lawsuit for the penalty. The Court left open whether Hills could amend its original lawsuit to seek that relief.
