= List of United States Supreme Court cases, volume 220 =

Supreme Court of the United States
- Interactive map of Supreme Court of the United States
- 38°53′26″N 77°00′16″W
- Established: March 4, 1789; 236 years ago
- Location: Washington, D.C.
- Coordinates: 38°53′26″N 77°00′16″W
- Composition method: Presidential nomination with Senate confirmation
- Authorised by: Constitution of the United States, Art. III, § 1
- Judge term length: life tenure, subject to impeachment and removal
- Number of positions: 9 (by statute)
- Website: supremecourt.gov

This is a list of cases reported in volume 220 of United States Reports, decided by the Supreme Court of the United States in 1911.

== Justices of the Supreme Court at the time of volume 220 U.S. ==
The Supreme Court is established by Article III, Section 1 of the Constitution of the United States, which says: "The judicial Power of the United States, shall be vested in one supreme Court . . .". The size of the Court is not specified; the Constitution leaves it to Congress to set the number of justices. Under the Judiciary Act of 1789 Congress originally fixed the number of justices at six (one chief justice and five associate justices). Since 1789 Congress has varied the size of the Court from six to seven, nine, ten, and back to nine justices (always including one chief justice).

When the cases in volume 220 were decided the Court comprised the following nine members:

Portrait	Justice	Office	Home State	Succeeded	Date confirmed by the Senate (Vote)	Tenure on Supreme Court
	Edward Douglass White	Chief Justice	Louisiana	Melville Fuller	December 12, 1910 (Acclamation)	December 19, 1910 – May 19, 1921 (Died)
	John Marshall Harlan	Associate Justice	Kentucky	David Davis	November 29, 1877 (Acclamation)	December 10, 1877 – October 14, 1911 (Died)
	Joseph McKenna	Associate Justice	California	Stephen Johnson Field	January 21, 1898 (Acclamation)	January 26, 1898 – January 5, 1925 (Retired)
	Oliver Wendell Holmes Jr.	Associate Justice	Massachusetts	Horace Gray	December 4, 1902 (Acclamation)	December 8, 1902 – January 12, 1932 (Retired)
	William R. Day	Associate Justice	Ohio	George Shiras Jr.	February 23, 1903 (Acclamation)	March 2, 1903 – November 13, 1922 (Retired)
	Horace Harmon Lurton	Associate Justice	Tennessee	Rufus W. Peckham	December 20, 1909 (Acclamation)	January 3, 1910 – July 12, 1914 (Died)
	Charles Evans Hughes	Associate Justice	New York	David Josiah Brewer	May 2, 1910 (Acclamation)	October 10, 1910 – June 10, 1916 (Resigned)
	Willis Van Devanter	Associate Justice	Wyoming	Edward Douglass White (as Associate Justice)	December 15, 1910 (Acclamation)	January 3, 1911 – June 2, 1937 (Retired)
	Joseph Rucker Lamar	Associate Justice	Georgia	William Henry Moody	December 15, 1910 (Acclamation)	January 3, 1911 – January 2, 1916 (Died)

== Citation style ==
Under the Judiciary Act of 1789 the federal court structure at the time comprised District Courts, which had general trial jurisdiction; Circuit Courts, which had mixed trial and appellate (from the US District Courts) jurisdiction; and the United States Supreme Court, which had appellate jurisdiction over the federal District and Circuit courts—and for certain issues over state courts. The Supreme Court also had limited original jurisdiction (i.e., in which cases could be filed directly with the Supreme Court without first having been heard by a lower federal or state court). There were one or more federal District Courts and/or Circuit Courts in each state, territory, or other geographical region.

The Judiciary Act of 1891 created the United States Courts of Appeals and reassigned the jurisdiction of most routine appeals from the district and circuit courts to these appellate courts. The Act created nine new courts that were originally known as the "United States Circuit Courts of Appeals." The new courts had jurisdiction over most appeals of lower court decisions. The Supreme Court could review either legal issues that a court of appeals certified or decisions of court of appeals by writ of certiorari.

Bluebook citation style is used for case names, citations, and jurisdictions.

- "# Cir." = United States Court of Appeals
  - e.g., "3d Cir." = United States Court of Appeals for the Third Circuit
- "C.C.D." = United States Circuit Court for the District of . . .
  - e.g.,"C.C.D.N.J." = United States Circuit Court for the District of New Jersey
- "D." = United States District Court for the District of . . .
  - e.g.,"D. Mass." = United States District Court for the District of Massachusetts
- "E." = Eastern; "M." = Middle; "N." = Northern; "S." = Southern; "W." = Western
  - e.g.,"C.C.S.D.N.Y." = United States Circuit Court for the Southern District of New York
  - e.g.,"M.D. Ala." = United States District Court for the Middle District of Alabama
- "Ct. Cl." = United States Court of Claims
- The abbreviation of a state's name alone indicates the highest appellate court in that state's judiciary at the time.
  - e.g.,"Pa." = Supreme Court of Pennsylvania
  - e.g.,"Me." = Supreme Judicial Court of Maine

== List of cases in volume 220 U.S. ==
Case Name	Page & year	Opinion of the Court	Concurring opinion(s)	Dissenting opinion(s)	Lower Court	Disposition
Virginia v. West Virginia	1 (1911)	Holmes	none	none	original	continued
United States v. Atchison et al. R.R. Co.	37 (1911)	Holmes	none	none	7th Cir.	affirmed
Hipolite Egg Co. v. United States	45 (1911)	McKenna	none	none	S.D. Ill.	affirmed
Lindsley v. Natural C.G. Co.	61 (1911)	VanDevanter	none	none	C.C.S.D.N.Y.	affirmed
In re Eastern Cherokees	83 (1911)	McKenna	none	none	Ct. Cl.	mandamus denied
Taylor v. Leesnitzer	90 (1911)	Holmes	none	none	D.C. Cir.	reversed
Baltimore & O.S.R.R. Co. v. United States	94 (1911)	Lamar	none	none	6th Cir.	affirmed
Flint v. Stone Tracy Co.	107 (1911)	Day	none	none	multiple	affirmed
Eliot v. Freeman	178 (1911)	Day	none	none	C.C.D. Mass.	reversed
Zonne v. Minneapolis Syndicate	187 (1911)	Day	none	none	C.C.D. Minn.	reversed
Ex parte Oklahoma I	191 (1911)	White	none	none	C.C.E.D. Okla.	prohibition denied
Ex parte Oklahoma II	210 (1911)	White	none	none	C.C.W.D. Okla.	prohibition denied
Martinez v. International B. Corp.	214 (1911)	White	none	none	Phil.	dismissed
Perez v. Fernandez	224 (1911)	White	none	none	D.P.R..	reversed
Blanco v. Hubbard	233 (1911)	White	none	none	D.P.R..	reversed
ICC v. Delaware et al. R.R. Co.	235 (1911)	White	none	none	C.C.S.D.N.Y.	reversed
United States v. Lehigh Valley R.R. Co.	257 (1911)	White	none	none	C.C.E.D. Pa.	reversed
United States v. Erie R.R. Co.	275 (1911)	White	none	none	C.C.E.D. Pa.	affirmed
Oklahoma v. Atchison et al. R.R. Co.	277 (1911)	Harlan	none	none	original	dismissed
Oklahoma ex rel. West v. Gulf et al. R.R. Co.	290 (1911)	Harlan	none	none	original	dismissed
Oklahoma ex rel. West v. Chicago et al. R.R. Co.	302 (1911)	Harlan	none	none	Okla.	affirmed
Enriquez v. Go-Tiongco	307 (1911)	Holmes	none	none	Phil.	affirmed
Arnett v. Reade	311 (1911)	Holmes	none	none	Sup. Ct. Terr. N.M.	reversed
United States v. O'Brien	321 (1911)	Holmes	none	none	2d Cir.	affirmed
Hills & Co. v. Hoover	329 (1911)	Day	none	none	3d Cir.	certification
Gavieres v. United States	338 (1911)	Day	none	none	Phil.	affirmed
Vilas v. City of Manila	345 (1911)	Lurton	none	none	Phil.	reversed
Western Union Tel. Co. v. Crovo	364 (1911)	Lurton	none	none	Va.	affirmed
Dr. Miles M. Co. v. Park & Sons Co.	373 (1911)	Hughes	none	Holmes	6th Cir.	affirmed
Chicago et al. R.R. Co. v. Willard	413 (1911)	Harlan	none	none	7th Cir.	affirmed
Diamond Rubber Co. v. Consolidated R.T. Co.	428 (1911)	McKenna	none	none	2d Cir.	affirmed
An inventor is not obliged to know the scientific theory underlying their invention; they can be a pure empiricist.
Standard Paint Co. v. Trinidad A. Mfg. Co.	446 (1911)	McKenna	none	none	8th Cir.	affirmed
Shawnee S. & D. Co. v. Stearns	462 (1911)	McKenna	none	none	C.C.W.D. Okla.	reversed
J.W. Perry Co. v. City of Norfolk	472 (1911)	Lamar	none	none	Va.	affirmed
Sac & Fox v. Sac & Fox	481 (1911)	Holmes	none	none	Ct. Cl.	affirmed
Ripley v. United States	491 (1911)	White	none	none	Ct. Cl.	remanded
Sena v. American Turquoise Co.	497 (1911)	Holmes	none	none	Sup. Ct. Terr. N.M.	affirmed
Sperry & H. Co. v. Rhodes	502 (1911)	Lamar	none	none	S.D. Cal.	reversed
United States v. Grimaud	506 (1911)	Lamar	none	none	S.D. Cal.	reversed
Light v. United States	523 (1911)	Lamar	none	none	C.C.D. Colo.	affirmed
Ex parte Metropolitan Water Co.	539 (1911)	White	none	none	C.C.D. Kan.	mandamus granted
United States v. Rimer	547 (1911)	White	none	none	4th Cir.	dismissed
Wise v. Mills	549 (1911)	White	none	none	C.C.S.D.N.Y.	dismissed
Wise v. Henkel	556 (1911)	White	none	none	C.C.S.D.N.Y.	dismissed
Chicago et al. R.R. Co. v. United States	559 (1911)	Harlan	none	none	8th Cir.	affirmed
Delk v. St. Louis et al. R.R. Co.	580 (1911)	Harlan	none	none	6th Cir.	reversed
Schlemmer v. Buffalo et al. R.R. Co.	590 (1911)	Day	none	none	Pa.	affirmed

== See also ==
- Certificate of division
