= United States v. Grimaud =

- Supreme Court of the United States

Argued February 28, 1910 Affirmed March 14, 1910 (by an equally divided court) Reargued March 3, 1911 Decided May 3, 1911
- Full case name: United States v. Pierre Grimaud and J. P. Carajous (No. 241) and United States v. Antonio Inda (No. 242)
- Citations: 220 U.S. 506 (more) 31 S. Ct. 480; 55 L. Ed. 563

Case history
- Prior: 170 F. 205 (S.D. Cal. 1909)

Holding
- Congress may delegate power to an agency to adopt regulations that are subject to criminal penalties.

Court membership
- Chief Justice Edward D. White Associate Justices John M. Harlan · Joseph McKenna; Oliver W. Holmes Jr. · William R. Day; Horace H. Lurton · Charles E. Hughes; Willis Van Devanter · Joseph R. Lamar

Case opinion
- Majority: Lamar, joined by unanimous

United States v. Grimaud, 220 U.S. 506 (1911), was a case argued before the Supreme Court of the United States. The case tested the constitutionality of the Forest Reserve Act of 1891, which delegated the power to make rules and regulations regarding the use of federal Forest Service lands and to punish violations of these rules as a criminal offense to the Secretary of the U.S. Department of Agriculture (a part of the Federal Executive Branch). The Court ruled, after a re-argument, that such a delegation of rulemaking power was permissible because it was separate from true legislative power (which is only vested in Congress as the legislative branch).

== Back story ==
Shepherds in California had seen the creation of forest reserves take place over the course of about ten years. In this time, the Forest Reserve Act of 1891 was established after wealthy capitalists from the northeast failed to monopolize the ranching industry. As a result, it left shepherds with less and less land to let their sheep graze, and this did not sit well with many of them.

Six years later, Congress enacted the Organic Act of 1897. This law “granted management authority to the United States Department of the Interior, then the nation’s sole custodian of the public domain." As part of this process, rangers were hired, and regulations were set for the use of these reserves’ various resources. "When in 1905 the United States Forest Service was established as part of the United States Department of Agriculture, and the nation's forests transferred to its care, the number of rangers increased again, the permitting process intensified, and the related rules and fees were widely published.” The new rules angered the shepherds, farmers, ranchers, miners, etc., especially those who were around when the land wasn’t protected by the government. It got to a point where these members of society began to directly defy the authority of these agencies. Miners sneaked onto reserves to pan for gold, loggers secretly harvested timber, and ranchers sneaked various livestock into and out of these protected lands. The case of the United States versus Pierre Grimaud begins in what is now Oakhurst, California. Pierre was one of these agitated workers; he just wasn’t lucky enough to break the law undetected.

In the early 20th century, Pierre Grimaud – a farmer and shepherd, attempted, with his partner PJ Carajous, to sneak his flock of sheep into the Sierra Forest Reserve. On his endeavor to find a good spot for his sheep to graze, he was stopped by a forest ranger who asked to see Grimaud’s permit. Once it was revealed that Grimaud did not have a permit, and was essentially trespassing, the forest ranger arrested him and took him to court.

== The trial(s) ==
It was found that Pierre Grimaud's case was more complicated than a simple case of trespassing. Grimaud and his lawyer denied the claim that Grimaud's actions were a crime against the United States because Congress broke the Constitution when it voted for the relevant forest laws and ordinances. These "rules and regulations," they said, were "Congress's attempt to give its legislative power to an administrative officer." If, as they said, this kind of delegation was against the Constitution, Grimaud couldn't have done anything wrong because there was no wrong to do. Since Grimaud made this a case involving constitutional law, it was eventually moved up to the Supreme Court where Grimaud was ruled guilty as if he had been tried. Grimaud’s claim was an obvious con, and the Court knew it, but constitutional law is difficult to navigate. Finally, after four years, the Supreme Court (specifically Justice Joseph Rucker Lamar) unanimously agreed that Grimaud “did knowingly, willfully, and unlawfully pasture and graze, and cause and procure to be pastured and grazed, certain sheep (the exact number being unknown to the grand jurors) upon certain land within the limits of and a part of said Sierra Forest Reserve, without having theretofore or at any time secured or obtained a permit or any permission for said pasturing or grazing, or any part of said sheep, as required by the said rules and regulations of the Secretary of Agriculture................. Grimaud's lawyers said that these accusations were not true. They said that when Congress first voted to support the relevant forest legislation, they did not have the right to do so under the Constitution. Congress was said to be giving the power they have over government property to an "administrative officer" who didn't have the right skills, the park ranger. If this were proven to be true, then Grimaud could not have committed a crime because there was no crime to commit. Initially, jurors didn't buy this defense, and decided that Pierre was guilty. The defense then appealed, or demurred, their case, which means that the case gets turned over to the district court. After more than a year of on-again, off again arguments, the District Court finally ruled in favor of Grimaud, overturning the lower court in the process. From here, the case was appealed to the Supreme Court, where the ruling was once again overturned, and the final ruling said that the Forestry Act was indeed constitutional and that Pierre Grimaud had broken the law. The only reason Pierre could even suggest that his being tried was unconstitutional in the first place was the final ruling in the Field v. Clark case. This case established that “Congress cannot delegate legislative power.” However, according to the Supreme Court, “the authority to make administrative rules is not a delegation of legislative power, and such rules do not become legislation because violations thereof are punished as public offenses.”

== Historical significance ==
“The immediate public reaction to Grimaud adopted the same view of the case.” The public, in general, agreed with the Supreme Court's decision. While some of the shepherds may have hoped for more freedom to graze, their hopes weren't very high, so the news of Grimaud's loss in court wasn't that unexpected. The day after the Court's decision, James Wilson said that as a result of Grimaud's case, the controversy “regarding the right to use grazing lands within the various national forests without a permit from the department of agriculture will be brought to an end.” This prediction was exactly correct. In 1911, the Department of Agriculture told Congress that "the uncertainty and unrest caused by the widespread belief that the [grazing] regulations were not enforced stopped immediately." Prior to United States v. Grimaud, shepherds and farmers in California had no real reason to fear the rangers patrolling the national forest. But after it was decided that the rangers' power was legal, the shepherds and farmers gave them respect. While the case of Grimaud v. United States was only explicitly mentioned in Light v. United States (another case of trespassing on forest grounds protected by the US government), it more clearly defined what Congress could do: “it could delegate power to an agency to adopt regulations subject to criminal penalties, provided that Congress itself legislated the penalties." Also, because criminal penalties are the worst kind of punishment for breaking an agency rule, Grimaud made it clear that Congress could give other kinds of punishments for breaking agency rules as well. Grimaud showed that Congress can give agencies the power to make rules that have a wide range of legal effects, as long as Congress spells out in a law what those effects are. Before the dispute between Pierre Grimaud and the United States government, there was a gray area surrounding this aspect of the central government's power. United States v. Grimaud permanently and clearly defined the extent of their power.
