= Virginia v. West Virginia (1911) =

- Supreme Court of the United States

Argued January 20, 23–26, 1911 Decided March 6, 1911
- Full case name: Virginia v. West Virginia
- Citations: 220 U.S. 1 (more) 31 S. Ct. 330; 55 L. Ed. 353; 1911 U.S. LEXIS 1658

Holding
- West Virginia was bound by its constitution to pay one-third of the outstanding debt of the state of Virginia as of January 1, 1861.

Court membership
- Chief Justice Edward D. White Associate Justices John M. Harlan · Joseph McKenna; Oliver W. Holmes Jr. · William R. Day; Horace H. Lurton · Charles E. Hughes; Willis Van Devanter · Joseph R. Lamar

Case opinion
- Majority: Holmes, joined by unanimous

Virginia v. West Virginia, 220 U.S. 1 (1911), is a unanimous ruling by the Supreme Court of the United States which held that the state of West Virginia was bound by its constitution to pay one-third of the outstanding debt of the commonwealth of Virginia as of January 1, 1861. In its ruling, the Supreme Court concluded that the geographic narrowness of the port and road improvements made by Virginia (most of which occurred outside West Virginia's current borders) were incurred by the people of the entire state and did not discharge West Virginia's duty to pay. The Court also held that Virginia's attempts to discharge its debts while its negotiations with West Virginia continued did not absolve West Virginia of its duty to pay. Although both states had already agreed on the amount to be paid, the Court ordered them to negotiate over interest computation.

== Background ==
At the beginning of the American Civil War, Virginia seceded from the United States in 1861. But many of the northwestern counties of Virginia were decidedly pro-union. At a convention duly called by the governor and authorized by the legislature, delegates voted on April 17, 1861, to approve Virginia's secession from the United States. Although the resolution required approval from voters (at an election scheduled for May 23, 1861), Virginia's governor entered into a treaty of alliance with the Confederate States of America on April 24, elected delegates to the Confederate Congress on April 29, and formally entered the Confederacy on May 7.

Unionist sentiment was so high in the northwestern counties that civil government began to disintegrate, and the Wheeling Intelligencer newspaper called for a convention of delegates to meet in the city of Wheeling to consider secession from the state of Virginia. Delegates duly assembled, and at the First Wheeling Convention (also known as the May Convention), held May 13 to 15, the delegates voted to hold off on secession from Virginia until Virginia formally seceded from the United States. Concerned that the irregular nature of the First Wheeling Convention might not democratically represent the will of the people, elections were scheduled for June 4 to formally elect delegates to a second convention, if necessary. Virginians voted to approve secession on May 23. On June 4, elections were held and delegates to a Second Wheeling Convention elected. These elections were irregular as well: Some were held under military pressure, some counties sent no delegates, some delegates never appeared, and voter turnout varied significantly. On June 19, the Second Wheeling Convention declared the offices of all government officials who had voted for secession vacant, and reconstituted the executive and legislative branches of the Virginia government from their own ranks. The Second Wheeling Convention adjourned on June 25 with the intent of reconvening on August 6.

The new Reorganized Governor, Francis Harrison Pierpont, asked President Abraham Lincoln for military assistance, and Lincoln recognized the new government. The region elected new U.S. Senators and its two existing Representatives took their old seats in the House, effectively giving Congressional recognition to the Reorganized Government as well.

After reconvening on August 6, the Second Wheeling Convention again debated secession from Virginia. The delegates adopted a resolution authorizing the secession of 39 counties, with additional counties to be added if their voters approved, and authorizing any contiguous counties with these to join the new state if they so voted as well. On October 24, 1861, voters in 41 counties approved seceding from the commonwealth of Virginia. The ballot also allowed voters to choose delegates to a constitutional convention, which met from November 26, 1861, to February 18, 1862. The constitutional convention chose the name "West Virginia" for the new state, and agreed to include a provision in the state constitution which provided for the new state to assume "an equitable portion" of the debt incurred by Virginia in developing and improving the counties which now formed the new state. The constitution required the state legislature to establish a sinking fund to repay the debt "as soon as practicable" but within at least 34 years (including interest). Article 8, §8 of the constitution read:

An equitable proportion of the public debt of the Commonwealth of Virginia prior to the first day of January in the year one thousand eight hundred and sixty-one shall be assumed by this state, and the legislature shall ascertain the same as soon as may be practicable, and provide for the liquidation thereof by a sinking fund sufficient to pay the accruing interest, and redeem the principal within thirty-four years.

The convention adopted the new constitution on February 18, 1862, and the constitution was approved by voters about two months later on April 4.

Reorganized Governor Pierpont recalled the Reorganized state legislature, which voted on May 13 to approve the secession. After much debate over whether Virginia had truly given its consent to the formation of the new state, the United States Congress adopted a statehood bill on July 14, 1862. President Lincoln was unsure of the bill's constitutionality, but pressed by Northern senators he signed the legislation on December 31, 1862. Luckily, the West Virginia constitutional convention had not adjourned sine die, and was called back into session on February 12, 1863, to amend the state's constitution to bring it in line with changes required by the federal statehood bill. The convention amended the state's constitution on February 17 and adjourned sine die on February 20. The state's voters ratified the amended constitution on March 26, 1863. On April 20, President Lincoln announced that West Virginia would become a state in 60 days.

In 1871, Virginia enacted legislation exchanging two-thirds of its outstanding bonds for new debt, and issuing certificates for the remaining one-third of the debt (which the state assumed would be paid by West Virginia) guaranteeing payment once the state's debt dispute with West Virginia was resolved. Virginia enacted legislation in 1879 reducing the interest rate on the outstanding one-third of the debt, but was unable to discharge the debt due to bondholder resistance. A second sale in 1882 also failed, and in 1892 Virginia issued new bonds to pay off the old one-third debt. Virginia established a commission in 1894 to negotiate with West Virginia over the debt, and in 1900 authorized the commission to accept the 1871 certificates from bondholders with the promise to pay once negotiations with West Virginia concluded.

After years of negotiations over the proper amount of debt, Virginia brought suit before the U.S. Supreme Court (which, under Article Three of the United States Constitution has original jurisdiction over suits in which a state is a party). Admitting the secession of West Virginia and the transfer of property and debt as proper, Virginia sued to recover one-third the worth of its 1861 debt (or about $33 million). For its part, West Virginia asserted that the one-third accounting was inaccurate, for it was based on the fact that West Virginia constituted one-third of the geographic size of the original state of Virginia and that most of the debt was incurred to improve areas now outside the boundaries of West Virginia. West Virginia claimed that under its constitution, only its state legislature could determine the amount of debt that was appropriate, and that Virginia's settlement with its bondholders was a bar to any suit. Furthermore, West Virginia refused to pay for the new certificates and bonds issued by Virginia or for stock purchases made by Virginia.

== Opinion of the Court ==
Associate Justice Oliver Wendell Holmes Jr. delivered the unanimous opinion of the court.

Justice Holmes first reviewed Virginia's claim and West Virginia's answer, as well as the ordinances and relevant state constitutional language in question. Holmes observed that a special master had found West Virginia liable for about $33.9 million in debt, which West Virginia had not disputed.

Holmes concluded that the Court was not required to apply existing law on debt, for a "state is superior to the forms that it may require of its citizens." A constitutional contract is not barred either, he said, so long as the "contemplated state" is actually created and so long as both contracting states and the United States had agreed to the terms. The ordinance of the Second Wheeling Convention which first made reference to the debt was irrelevant in the proceedings, as it is neither referred to nor included in the West Virginia constitution, the legislation of the Reorganized Government of Virginia which consented to secession, or the statehood act passed by Congress.

Holmes held against West Virginia's claim that the amount of debt should be reduced because the debt paid for improvements outside the boundaries of West Virginia. Although West Virginia was correct in observing that improvements were outside its boundaries, he wrote, the improvements were financed by state bonds and purchases of stock in corporations making the improvements. Since bond sales and stock purchases were made by the state on behalf of all citizens, all citizens shared in the risk and all citizens shared in the benefit. "...we should be lost in futile detail if we should try to unravel in each instance the ultimate scope of the scheme. ... All the expenditures had the ultimate good of the whole state in view. Therefore we adhere to our conclusion that West Virginia's share of the debt must be ascertained in a different way," Holmes concluded. Nor was ascertaining the amount of debt to be left solely to the West Virginia legislature. Holmes pointed out the danger and inequitable nature of such a scheme, and asserted the Court's jurisdiction over the case:

The provision in the Constitution of the State of West Virginia that the legislature shall ascertain the proportion as soon as may be practicable was not intended to undo the contract in the preceding words by making the representative and mouthpiece of one of the parties the sole tribunal for its enforcement. It was simply an exhortation and command from supreme to subordinate authority to perform the promise as soon as might be, and an indication of the way. Apart from the language used, what is just and equitable is a judicial question similar to many that arise in private litigation, and in no wise beyond the competence of a tribunal to decide.

Having dealt with the foregoing issues, Holmes now confronted whether West Virginia had a duty to pay for the new bonds and certificates issued by Virginia between 1871 and 1900 in its attempt to discharge the one-third debt remaining on its books. The Supreme Court had ruled on the legality of Virginia's debt substitution and duty to pay in numerous cases over the past. Citing Hartman v. Greenhow, 102 U.S. 672 (1880) and McGahey v. Virginia, 135 U.S. 662 (1890), in particular, Holmes observed that the Court had already intimated that West Virginia had a duty to pay these outstanding debts, and now he reaffirmed that duty explicitly.

West Virginia had argued that since Virginia had paid off the one-third debt, Virginia could no longer be a party to any debt suit against West Virginia. Under the criteria established in New Hampshire v. Louisiana, 108 U.S. 76 (1883), a state could not assume the private debts of its citizens and create an end-run around the Eleventh Amendment (which prevents federal courts from hearing suits brought by the citizen of one state against another state). Holmes disagreed:

The liability of West Virginia is a deepseated equity, not discharged by changes in the form of the debt, nor split up by the unilateral attempt of Virginia to apportion specific parts to the two states. If one-third of the debt were discharged in fact to all intents, we perceive no reason in what has happened why West Virginia should not contribute her proportion of the remaining two-thirds. But we are of opinion that no part of the debt is extinguished, and further, that nothing has happened to bring the rule of New Hampshire v. Louisiana into play.

Furthermore, the contract contained in the West Virginia constitution provided additional for grounds for Virginia to be party to any suit.

Holmes expressed the Court's concern over how to compute interest on the debt, given the large amount of time (a half-century) which had passed. The majority concluded that the states should negotiate over the matter, and another special master appointed if the issue proved contentious.

The Court ordered West Virginia to pay its one-third portion of the debt, pending resolution of the interest computation question.

== Bibliography ==
- Davis, William C. and Robertson, James I. Virginia at War. Lexington, Ky.: University Press of Kentucky, 2005.
- Kesavan, Vasan and Paulsen, Michael Stokes. "Is West Virginia Unconstitutional?" California Law Review. 90:291 (March 2002).
- McPherson, James M. Battle Cry of Freedom: The Civil War Era. New York: Oxford University Press, 1988.
- Randall, James G. Constitutional Problems Under Lincoln. Rev. ed. Urbana, Ill.: University of Illinois Press, 1951.
- Rice, Otis K. and Brown, Stephen Wayne. West Virginia: A History. Lexington, Ky.: University Press of Kentucky, 1993.
