= Appropriation bill =

Bill or law authorizing expenditure of government funds

An appropriation bill, also known as supply bill or spending bill, is a proposed law that authorizes the expenditure of government funds. It is a bill that sets money aside for specific spending. In some democracies, approval of the legislature is necessary for the government to spend money.

In a Westminster parliamentary system, the defeat of an appropriation bill in a parliamentary vote generally necessitates either the resignation of a government or the calling of a general election. One of the more famous examples of the defeat of a supply bill was the 1975 Australian constitutional crisis, when the Senate, which was controlled by the opposition, refused to approve a package of appropriation and loan bills, prompting Governor-General Sir John Kerr to dismiss Prime Minister Gough Whitlam and appoint Malcolm Fraser as caretaker Prime Minister until the next election (where the Fraser government was elected).

== By country ==
=== India ===
An appropriation bill is a bill that authorizes the government to withdraw funds from the Consolidated Fund of India for use during the financial year. Although Appropriation Acts are not included in any official list of central laws, they technically remain on the books. Since 2016, appropriation bills in India include a sunset clause as result of which the Act is automatically repealed after its purpose is met. Appropriation Acts passed prior to 2016 were repealed by the enactment of The Appropriation Acts (Repeal) Act, 2015 in April 2016.

=== New Zealand ===
In New Zealand, an Appropriation Bill is the formal name for the annual Act of Parliament that gives legal effect to the New Zealand Budget, that is, the Government's taxing and spending policies for the forthcoming year (from 1 July to 30 June). Like other bills, it is enacted, following debate, by the House of Representatives, and assented to by the governor-general. The main Appropriation Bill is traditionally placed before the House for its first reading in May amid considerable media interest, an event known as the introduction of the Budget. An Appropriation Bill is not sent to a select committee, a lengthy process undergone by most bills during which they are scrutinised in detail by the committee, which also receives public submissions relating to the bill. Instead, an expedited process is followed in which the Appropriation Bill essentially goes directly to its second reading for consideration by the committee of the whole House. Royal assent is granted after the formality of a third reading.

The main Appropriation Bill is formally called an "Appropriation (Estimates) Bill", or, after assented to, an "Appropriation (Estimates) Act". Supplementary Budgetary legislation in New Zealand includes an annual "Appropriation (Confirmation and Validation) Bill", which serves to validate taxation and spending incurred in the previous year which fell outside the previous year's Budget, and "Imprest Supply Bills," typically several in a year, which grant interim authority to the Government to tax and spend.

Both Appropriation and Imprest Supply bills fall under the rubric of confidence and supply. A refusal by the House to pass such a Bill conventionally leads to either the resignation of the Government (unlikely, since there is usually no alternative Government immediately available) or to a dissolution of the House and a subsequent general election.

=== Philippines ===
In the Philippines, the Congress which consists of the House of Representatives and the Senate is mandated to pass a General Appropriation Bill annually. If the Congress fails to pass a General Appropriation Bill for a fiscal year, the General Appropriation Act for the previous fiscal year would be used until a bill for the specific year is passed.

=== United States ===
Under the presidential system, the support of the Congress for the President's appropriations requests is not necessary for the separately-elected President to remain in office, but it can severely limit the President's ability to govern effectively.

In the United States, there are two types of appropriations. When Congress sets up particular programs, the legislation may itself set up the necessary appropriation mechanism, such as the social security program for which payment of benefits are "mandatory". A mandatory program does not need an additional authorisation for spending under the program to occur. An authorization bill can create programs and make known Congress's intended level of spending for programs that also require an appropriation. What distinguishes a mandatory program from a discretionary program is that after Congress enacts a law creating a mandatory program, the program may spend funds until the program expires based on a provision in law or until a subsequent law either terminates the program or reauthorizes it. Discretionary programs typically require annual appropriations legislation.

An appropriation bill is used for actually providing money for "discretionary" programs. Appropriations are generally done on an annual basis, but multi-year appropriations are occasionally passed. According to the US Constitution (Article I, Section 8, clause 12), Army appropriations cannot be for more than two years at a time. An annual appropriation requires that the funds appropriated to be obligated (spent) by the end of the fiscal year of the appropriation. Once the fiscal year ends, no more money can be spent via the prior year's appropriation. A new appropriation for the new fiscal year must be passed in order for continued spending to occur or passage of a special appropriations bill known as a continuing resolution, which generally permits continued spending for a short period of time, usually at prior year levels. The Anti-Deficiency Act makes void any attempt to spend money for which there is no current appropriation.

According to the Origination Clause of the US Constitution, all bills for raising revenue, generally tax bills, must originate in the House of Representatives, similar to the Westminster system requirement for all money bills to originate in the lower house. Traditionally, appropriation bills originate in the House of Representatives. House appropriations bills begin with "H.R.", meaning "House of Representatives." In reference to revenue bills, the Constitution also states that the "Senate may propose or concur with Amendments as on other Bills." As with revenue bills, the Senate and House each drafts and considers its own appropriation bill. The Senate then cuts and pastes, substitutes the language of its version of a particular appropriation bill for the language of the House bill, and agrees to the bill as amended.

The United States House Committee on Appropriations and the United States Senate Committee on Appropriations have jurisdiction over appropriations bills. Both committees have twelve matching subcommittees tasked with working on one of the twelve annual regular appropriations bills. Other committees and lawmakers in Congress write legislation creating programs and reauthorizing old ones to continue. That legislation is called an authorization bill. Such legislation authorizes the programs to exist and expenditure of funds on them, but it cannot actually give them the money. That second step of granting the money is done in an appropriations bill. The appropriations committees have power because they can decide whether to fund the programs at the maximum level authorized, a lesser amount, or not at all.

Appropriations bills in the United States can also come in the format of an omnibus spending bill, a continuing resolution, or a supplemental appropriation bill. If Congress has not enacted the regular appropriations bills by the start of a new fiscal year, it can pass a continuing resolution, which continues the pre-existing appropriations at the same levels as the previous fiscal year (or with minor modifications) for a set amount of time. An omnibus spending bill is simply a combination of multiple appropriations bills into one larger appropriations bill. Supplemental appropriations bills increase funding for activities that were already funded in previous appropriations bills or provide new funding for unexpected expenses. For example, both the War in Afghanistan and the Iraq War were funded with a variety of supplemental appropriations. Supplemental appropriations bills also provide funding for recovering from unexpected natural disasters like Hurricane Sandy (the Disaster Relief Appropriations Act, 2013).

Annual appropriations are divided into 12 separate pieces of legislation:

1. Agriculture,
2. Commerce, Justice, and Science,
3. Defense,
4. Energy and Water,
5. Financial Services,
6. Homeland Security,
7. Interior and Environment,
8. Labor, Health and Human Services, and Education,
9. Legislative,
10. Military and Veterans,
11. State and Foreign Operations,
12. Transportation and Housing and Urban Development.

== See also ==
- Appropriation Act (U.K.)
- Loss of supply
