= Federalist No. 56 =

Federalist Paper by James Madison

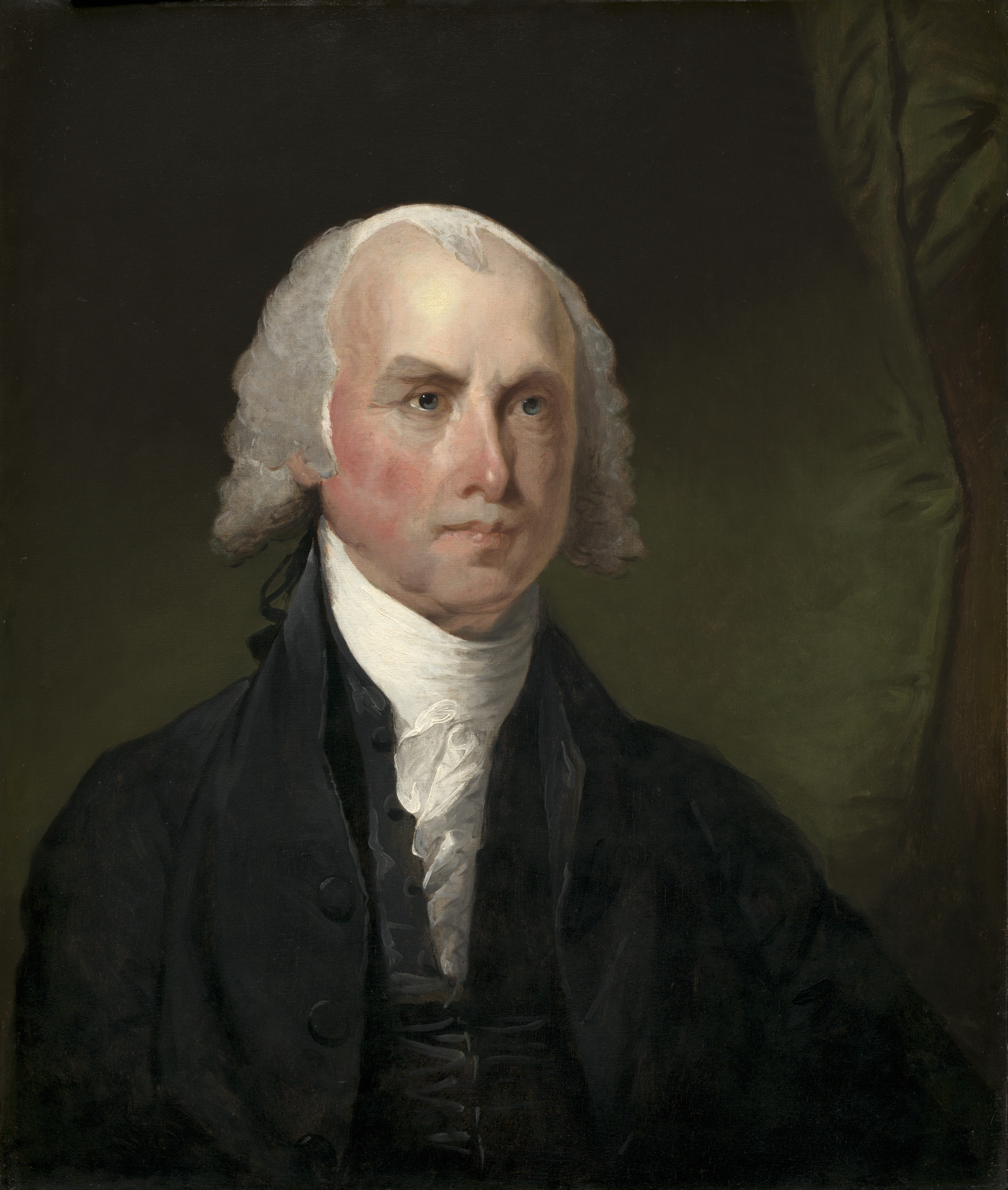
- James Madison, one of the proposed authors of Federalist No. 56
- Author: James Madison or Alexander Hamilton
- Original title: The Same Subject Continued: The Total Number of the House of Representatives
- Language: English
- Series: The Federalist
- Publisher: New York Packet
- Publication date: February 16, 1788
- Publication place: United States
- Media type: Newspaper
- Preceded by: Federalist No. 55
- Followed by: Federalist No. 57

Federalist No. 56 is an essay by either James Madison or Alexander Hamilton, the fifty-sixth of The Federalist Papers. It was first published by The New York Packet on February 16, 1788, under the pseudonym Publius, the name under which all The Federalist papers were published. Continuing from Federalist No. 55, this paper discusses the size of the United States House of Representatives. It is titled "The Same Subject Continued: The Total Number of the House of Representatives". In this paper, Madison addresses the criticism that the House of Representatives is too small to sufficiently understand the varied interests of all its constituents. He goes on further to explain that representatives represent large numbers of people, effectively explaining why the "smaller" size of the House of Representatives was sufficient.
