= Blue slip (U.S. House of Representatives) =

Legislative procedure in the United States House of Representatives

In the House of Representatives, a blue slip is a rejection slip given to tax and spending bills sent to it by the Senate that did not originate in the House, according to the House's interpretation of the Origination Clause of the Constitution of the United States.

== Overview ==
The Origination Clause of the United States Constitution (Article I, Section 7, Clause 1) provides that the House of Representatives has exclusive authority to introduce bills raising revenue: "All bills for raising Revenue shall originate in the House of Representatives." As such, the House considers itself to be the only proper venue to originate any bills appropriating revenue.

When, in the opinion of the House of Representatives, a Senate-introduced bill that raises revenue or appropriates money is passed by the Senate and sent to the House for its consideration, the House places a blue slip on the legislation that notes the House's constitutional prerogative and returns it to the Senate without taking further action. This blue-slipping procedure, done by an order of the House, is routinely completed to enforce its interpretation that the House is the sole body to introduce revenue or appropriations legislation. The failure of the House to consider the legislation means it cannot become a law. This tactic is historically of great use to the House and, as a practical matter, the Senate does not introduce tax or revenue measures in order to avoid a blue slip.

The Senate can circumvent this requirement by substituting the text of any bill previously passed by the House with the text of a revenue bill.
