= United States v. Munoz-Flores =

- Supreme Court of the United States

Argued February 20, 1990 Decided May 21, 1990
- Full case name: United States v. German Munoz-Flores
- Citations: 495 U.S. 385 (more) 110 S.Ct. 1964; 109 L. Ed. 2d 384

Holding
- The "special assessments" statute, 18. U.S.C. §3013 (2006), which requires a monetary penalty be imposed on those convicted of federal misdemeanor crimes, is not a "revenue bill" and so does not violate the Origination Clause of the Constitution.

Court membership
- Chief Justice William Rehnquist Associate Justices William J. Brennan Jr. · Byron White; Thurgood Marshall · Harry Blackmun; John P. Stevens · Sandra Day O'Connor; Antonin Scalia · Anthony Kennedy

Case opinions
- Majority: Marshall, joined by Rehnquist, Brennan, White, Blackmun, Kennedy
- Concurrence: Stevens, joined by O'Connor
- Concurrence: Scalia

Laws applied
- U.S. Const. Art. I § 7; 18 U.S.C. §3013

United States v. Munoz-Flores, 495 U.S. 385 (1990), was a United States Supreme Court case that interpreted the Origination Clause of the United States Constitution. The Court was asked to rule on whether a statute that imposed mandatory monetary penalties on persons convicted of federal misdemeanors was enacted in violation of that clause, as the lower court had held.

== Background ==
In June 1985, German Munoz-Flores was charged with and pleaded guilty to aiding the illegal entry of aliens into the United States. Both misdemeanor counts were for aiding and abetting aliens to elude examination and inspection by immigration officers. A provision of the federal criminal codes requires courts to impose a "special assessment" monetary penalty on any person convicted of a federal misdemeanor.

The money accrued from the special assessments is given to the Crime Victims Fund, which was established by the Victims of Crime Act of 1984. The fund uses the money for programs to both compensate and assist victims of federal crimes.

Munoz-Flores moved to correct his sentence by arguing that the special assessments ($25 per offense in his case) were unconstitutional because they violated the Origination Clause of the Constitution. The Ninth Circuit Court of Appeals held in favor of Munoz-Flores.

== Supreme Court decision ==
The issue at the center of the case was whether the statute requiring the special assessments conflicts with the Constitution. The Origination Clause states, "All Bills for raising Revenue shall originate in the House of Representatives...." The Court was tasked with deciding whether the special assessments statute qualified as a "bill for raising revenue," per the Origination Clause.

In an opinion by Justice Marshall, the Court relied on precedent to find that the special assessments should not be considered a revenue bill. The Court stated that as a general rule, a statute that establishes a federal program and raises revenue to support that program does not violate the Constitution. The Court differentiated that type of revenue from a statute raising revenue to support government generally. Justice Marshall wrote, "Although the House certainly can refuse to pass a bill because it violates the Origination Clause, the ability does not absolve this Court of its responsibility to consider constitutional challenges to congressional enactments." He continued, "A law passed in violation of the Origination Clause would thus be no more immune from judicial scrutiny because it was passed by both houses and signed by the President than would a law passed in violation of the First Amendment." Thus, the Court made it clear that despite the finding that the special assessment was not a revenue bill, even if it had been a revenue bill and then had subsequently been passed by both houses, it would still be subject to judicial review of its legality.

=== Justice Stevens's concurrence ===
Justice Stevens filed a concurring opinion in the case in which he argued that a bill can originate unconstitutionally but still become an enforceable law if it is passed by both houses of Congress and signed by the President. Justice Stevens argued that it was unnecessary for the Court to decide whether the statute was passed in violation of the Origination Clause because it passed both houses of Congress and was signed by the President. He rested the argument on the fact that while the Origination Clause provides for how Congress and the President should go about enacting laws, it is silent as to what the consequences should be for an improper origination.
