= Federalist No. 61 =

Essay by Alexander Hamilton on the U.S. Constitution

- Alexander Hamilton, author of Federalist No. 61
- Author: Alexander Hamilton
- Original title: The Same Subject Continued: Concerning the Power of Congress to Regulate the Election of Members
- Language: English
- Series: The Federalist
- Publisher: New York Packet
- Publication date: February 26, 1788
- Publication place: United States
- Media type: Newspaper
- Preceded by: Federalist No. 60
- Followed by: Federalist No. 62

Federalist No. 61 is an essay by Alexander Hamilton, the sixty-first of The Federalist Papers. It was first published by The New York Packet on February 26, 1788 under the pseudonym Publius, the name under which all The Federalist papers were published. This is the last of three papers discussing the power of Congress over the election of its own members. It is titled "The Same Subject Continued: Concerning the Power of Congress to Regulate the Election of Members".

== Hamilton's Argument vs. Counter Arguments ==
In this paper, Hamilton responds to the claim that the Constitution should have required elections to be held in the counties where the electors reside. This would prevent Congress from forcing States to hold elections in a location inconvenient to the voters, or a certain segment of voters.

Hamilton responds that in many state constitutions, including New York’s, there is no such provision for the location of elections and that no harm resulted from this omission.

Furthermore, Hamilton asserts that there will be a significant advantage in allowing Congress to set a uniform time for elections to be held. He argues that placing the entire house and one third of the senate before the people for reelection at the same time will help ensure that the same detrimental “spirit” or “faction” will not continue for long in Congress. He speculates that if each state could hold elections at different times, then members of Congress would be added and removed gradually and thus make new members, few in number, susceptible to pressure from the majority of Congress to support a particular faction detrimental to the public good.

== Influence in Congress ==
Alexander Hamilton and Thomas Jefferson clearly show what happens when factions are formed within the government. Thanks to Hamilton and Jefferson's constant arguments in which they opposed each other, they helped to form the first institutional American Party system. Jeffersonians became Democratic-Republicans and Hamiltonians became federalist. The party leaders moved rapidly to exploit the many political implications they discovered in any controversy applicable to any then current situation. By simply declaring enough and loudly enough, the editors from either sides backed by newspapers were able to make considerable political issue out of a basically non partisan dispute.

== Analysis / Reaction ==
Alexander Hamilton wanted to eliminate the threat of factions within the congress. He knew Factions could be integral players in congress that shape members' preferences, develop policy agendas, and push those agendas. Factions having power within congress would eliminate the power of the voter as well as the people who opposed the faction. Because [American] political parties are neither as strong as some suggest nor as weak as others hold, it is often the case that factions are important actors within them. These factions are usually informally organized through networks that take on names and comprise a core cadre of a party. Because of that reasoning, factions lead to individual members seeking their own self-interest when it comes to persevering power or writing policies. Such networks link members of congress to party activists, interest groups, and intellectuals in an effort to control the policymaking process.

To advance their goals, legislators join factions in order to shift the distribution of power in congress; even sometimes going so far to change the institutions rules, yet, their strategies for achieving their objectives vary. The end result is obvious and is the reason why factions have been involved in the creation and destruction of congressional regimes, despite Hamilton's disposition toward them.
