= Federalist No. 58 =

Federalist Paper by James Madison

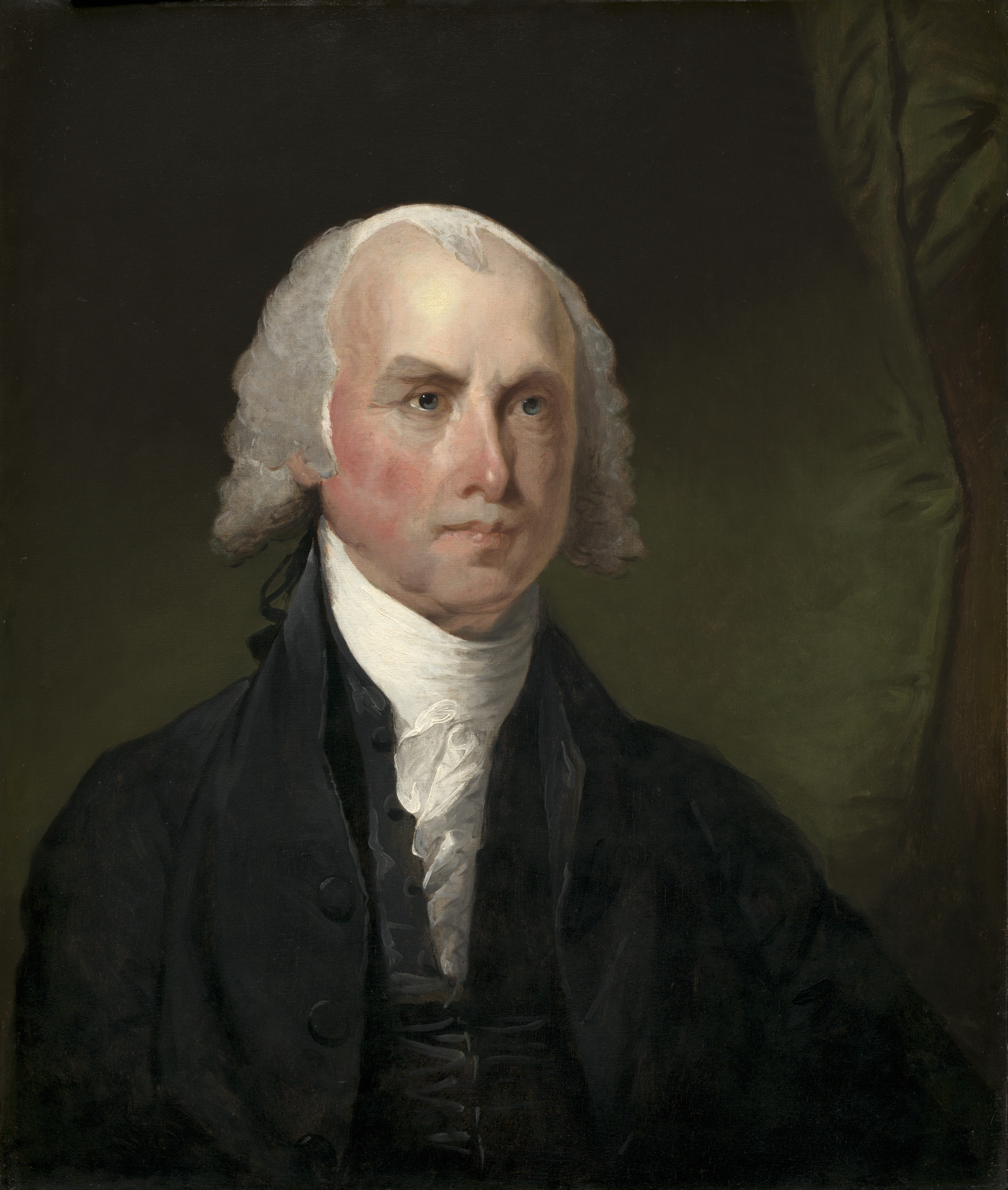
- James Madison, author of Federalist No. 58
- Author: James Madison
- Original title: Objection That The Number of Members Will Not Be Augmented as the Progress of Population Demands Considered
- Language: English
- Series: The Federalist
- Publisher: New York Packet
- Publication date: February 20, 1788
- Publication place: United States
- Media type: Newspaper
- Preceded by: Federalist No. 57
- Followed by: Federalist No. 59

Federalist No. 58 is an essay by James Madison, the fifty-eighth of The Federalist Papers. It was first published by The New York Packet on February 20, 1788, under the pseudonym Publius, the name under which all The Federalist papers were published. This paper examines the ability of the United States House of Representatives to grow with the population of the United States. It is titled "Objection That The Number of Members Will Not Be Augmented as the Progress of Population Demands Considered".

The main topic of discussion in Federalist Paper number 58 is the apportionment of the representatives for each state. Constitutionally, the number of Senators per state is two, no matter the population. The number of House Representatives, however, was to be solely based on population (30,000 per representative). Less populated (so-called smaller) states, Madison says, are complaining for they fear they will not justly be represented because they have fewer representatives in the House than larger states. Madison addresses their complaints by pointing out that they actually have the advantage when it comes to Senators. He points out the ridiculous, illogical, and passionate claims of both the complaining larger and smaller states. The smaller states wish for every state to have the same number of representatives in the House, but Madison again conveys that this would be wholly illogical because there would be very few people being represented by many representatives in some cases, and very few representatives for a vast number of people in others.

Madison then discusses the reasons fewer representatives in the House are actually more beneficial than having a vast number. He points out that when there are more representatives than needed, passion will often rule over logic and order; with more representatives in the House, chaos would prevail over order and unification, resulting in the depletion of the House's purpose. Madison also mentions that the more representatives they have, the less information and insight each one will have; essentially, as the number increases, the quality of each individual will predictably decrease. Another disadvantage that Madison mentions is the pliability within the House. He says that if there are more representatives, they will be likely to be easily persuaded by a cunning speaker; the weak-mindedness of the majority cannot withstand the shrewdness of the minority. Madison also briefly mentions the wishes of some states that rulings be passed on a vote of more than a majority. For example, if 59% of the House votes for a certain law to be passed, and 41% vote against it, then the law will not be passed because there are not a significant number of votes over the majority. Madison says that this method of voting is not only inefficient, because no laws would ever be passed, but that the government would be more oligarchic rather than democratic (rule of elite or minority rather than majority).
