= Rent regulation in New York =

Means of limiting the amount of rent charged on dwellings

Rent regulation in New York is a means of limiting the amount of rent charged on dwellings. Rent control and rent stabilization are two programs used in parts of New York state (and other jurisdictions). In addition to controlling rent, the system also prescribes rights and obligations for tenants and landlords.

Each city in the state chooses whether to participate. As of 2007, 51 municipalities participated in the program, including Albany, Buffalo, and New York City, where over one million apartments are regulated. Other rent-controlled municipalities include Nassau, Westchester, Rensselaer, Schenectady, and Erie counties.

In New York City, rent stabilization applies to all apartments except for certain classes of housing accommodations for so long as they uphold the status that gives them the exemption.

== Rent control ==
=== Qualification ===
To qualify for rent control, a tenant must have been continuously living in an apartment since July 1, 1971, or be a qualifying family member who succeeded to such tenancy. When vacant, a rent-controlled unit becomes "rent stabilized", except in buildings with fewer than six units, where it is usually decontrolled. In units within single and two-family homes, the tenant must have resided in the unit continuously since March 31, 1952, to qualify for rent control. Once the unit becomes vacant, it is decontrolled. Rent control does not generally apply to units built after 1947.

=== Terms ===
Rent control limits the price a landlord can charge a tenant for rent and also regulates the services the landlord must provide. Failure to provide these may allow the tenant to receive a lower rent. Outside of New York City, the state government determines the maximum rents and rate increases, and owners may periodically apply for increases.

In New York City, rent control is based on the Maximum Base Rent system. A maximum allowable rent is established for each unit. Every two years, the landlord may increase the rent up to 7.5% (as of 2012) until the Maximum Base Rent is reached. However, the tenant may challenge these increases on grounds that the building has violations or that the higher amount exceeds that needed to cover expenses. Maximum Base Rent (MBR) is calculated to ensure the rent from rent control units covers the cost of building maintenance and improvements. The formula reflects real estate taxes, water and sewer charges, operating and maintenance expenses, return on capital and vacancy and collection loss allowance. The MBR is updated every two years to reflect changes in these expenses. Owners must apply for the Maximum Base Rent system for the tenants.

== Rent stabilization ==
Rent stabilization is applicable to New York City, Nassau, Rockland, and Westchester counties. It generally applies to buildings of six or more units built before 1974 that are not subject to rent control. Owners of more recent buildings can agree to rent stabilization in exchange for tax benefits. Regulation and policies vary by municipality. Buildings such as housing owned by non-profit corporations are not included in the program. Upon leaving programs such as the Mitchell-Lama Housing Program or Section 8, housing may enter rent stabilization if built before 1974. Apartments that are converted into co-ops and condos and vacated after July 7, 1993, may not be subject to rent stabilization. For rents to be placed under regulation, the municipality must declare a housing emergency and the rental vacancy rate must be less than 5% for all or any class or classes of rental housing accommodations, as demonstrated by a housing vacancy survey.

=== Qualification ===
New York City rent stabilization qualifications changed over the years, purportedly to curb perceived abuses that allowed the wealthy to enjoy protection that was ostensibly intended for the working class. The apartment must be the tenant's primary residence to qualify for stabilization. Vacancy Decontrol and High-Income Deregulation were enacted in 1997 and abolished in 2019. Renovations are no longer a path to deregulation, nor is any level of rent increase, as there is no high-rent threshold. Apartments that were legally deregulated prior to 2019 remain market rate.

Tenants who live in buildings built between February 1, 1947, and January 1, 1974, or who move into a pre-1947 building or into certain post-1974 buildings that received tax breaks (such as the 80-20 housing program) qualify for rent stabilization if the other above terms are met. As part of city managed programs, some buildings become temporarily rent stabilized in return for a temporary reduction in real estate taxes when those buildings have been converted to residential use from commercial or industrial. Two of those programs, J-51 for renovating buildings and 421-a for new construction, grant temporary rent stabilization to tenants of apartments in those buildings, thus overriding other qualifications.

=== Terms ===
Rent stabilization sets maximum rates for annual rent increases and, as with rent control, entitles tenants to receive required services from their landlords along with lease renewals. The rent guidelines board meets every year to determine how much the landlord can charge. Violations may cause a tenant's rent to be lowered. There are multiple ways a building owner can free their property from rent regulation: two popular methods are to claim substantial rehabilitation or the need for demolition.

=== Criticism ===
Landlords in New York City have criticized rent stabilization over the decades. Some blamed it for the housing shortage in New York City, alleging that rent stabilization has made repairs necessary to list units cost-prohibitive. A 2025 report by the New York City Rent Guidelines Board found that the city had nearly 50,000 empty but unavailable units because their operating or renovation costs could not be recouped through legally allowable rents.

== History ==
History of rent regulation in NYC
1920–1929	Emergency Rent Laws passed in response to 1918–1920 New York City rent strikes and extended several times before expiring in 1929.
1931–1933	Rent uncontrolled but rental assistance was provided by federal Home Relief Bureau as a result of 1931–1933 New York City rent strikes.
1934–1939	Uncontrolled
1939–1943	Slum rent control, known as the Minkoff Act of 1939, enacted as a result of pressure from the United Tenants League. Expired in 1943, after being extended in 1940.
1943–1945	WW2 federal rent controls under the Office of Price Administation. OPA decided whether cities received them on a case by case basis. After initially refusing to institute such controls within NYC, OPA applied them after pressure from the UTL.
1946	NYC rent control law passed by New York State in event of OPA controls expiration.
1951	NY State took over administration of rent control as federal controls expired.
1953, 1958	Series of rent decontroll laws enacted.
1961	Administration of 1.8 million NYC rent controlled apartments transferred from state to city control.
1964, 1968	Series of rent decontroling laws for luxury apartments.
1969	Rent Stabilization Law passed and Rent Guidelines Board established.
1971	Vacancy decontrol applied to all units.
1974	Decontrolled and destabilized units were re-regulated under the Emergency Tenant Protection Act of 1974
1983	Omnibus Housing Act transferred rent regulation administration from the City to the State DHCR.
1993, 1997	Series of rent decontrolling laws passed.
2003	Rent Law of 2003 passed, in effect until 2011.
2011	Rent Law of 2011 passed, in effect until 2015.
2015	Rent Law of 2015 passed, in effect until 2019.
2019	The Housing Stability and Tenant Protection Act (HSTPA) of 2019 passed by New York State banning deregulation of rent stabilized units or of vacancy allowances for vacant units.
2024	Good Cause Eviction Law passed by New York State provides certain tenant protections. Landlords covered under it cannot end a tenancy without one of the “good cause” reasons provided in the statute. It allows tenants to use this law as a defense in Housing Court. Tenants can also use the law to challenge “unreasonable” rent increases, which is defined as the lesser of 10% or the most recent annual Consumer Price Index + 5%.
2025	NYC Rent Transparency Act (2025) passed.

=== First rent laws in the nation (1920–1929) ===
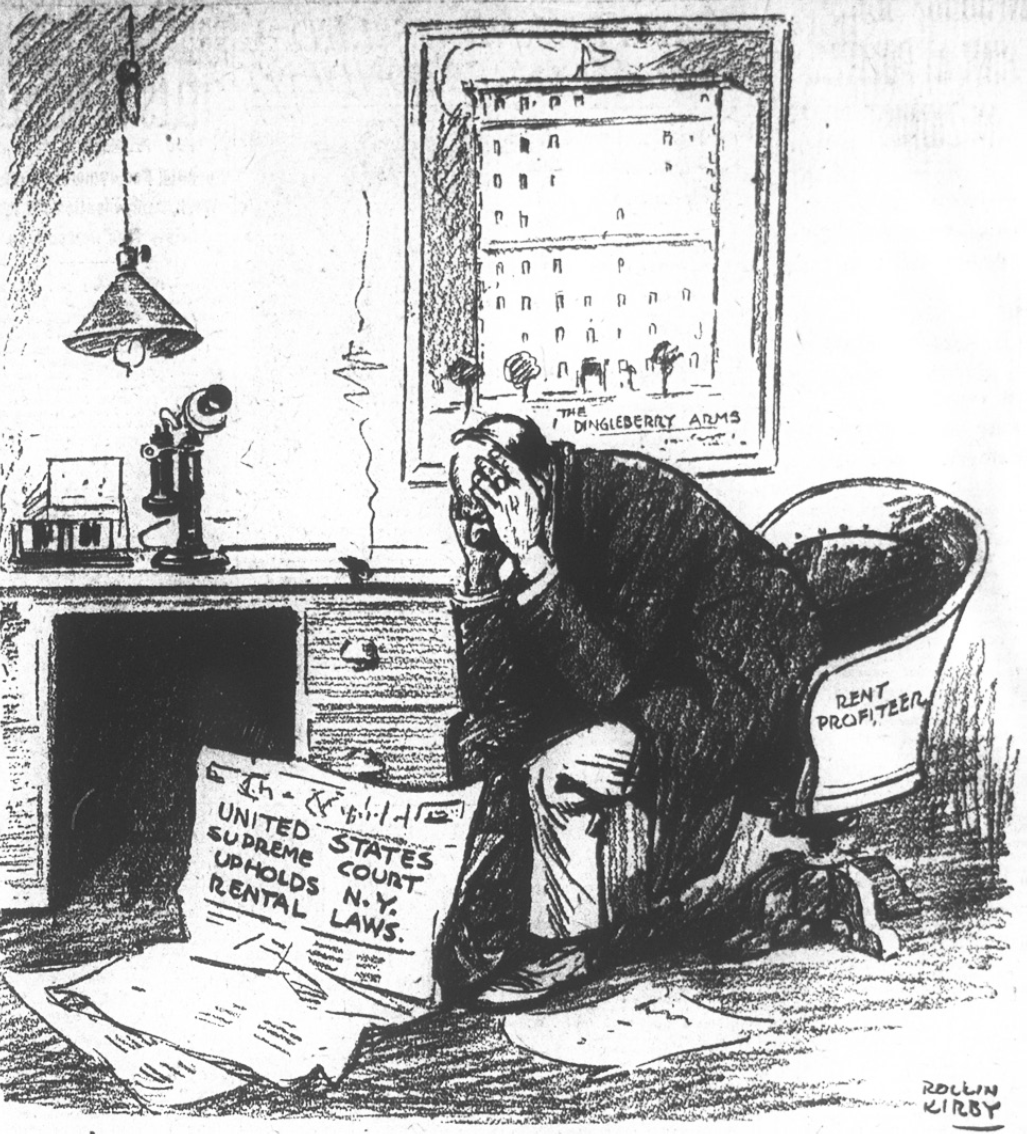
New York World, April 20, 1921

In 1920, New York adopted the Emergency Rent Laws, which effectively charged the courts of New York State with their administration. The rent laws were the result of a series of widespread rent strikes in New York City from 1918 to 1920 that had been sparked by a World War I coal and housing shortage with the subsequent land speculation and raising of rents which had followed it.

The laws stated that when challenged by tenants, rent increases were reviewed by a standard of "reasonableness". The definition of reasonableness was subject to judicial interpretation. After some court decisions, judges primarily settled on a 8% total profit on the market value of the property being considered a reasonable return. Landlords attempted to circumvent this cap on rent through "paper exchanges" of buildings to artificially inflate property market values. However, in spite of this, the new law still meaningfully limited rents in relation to previous raises before.

Certain apartments were decontrolled beginning in 1926, and the Rent Laws of 1920 expired completely in June 1929, although limited protections against evictions considered unjust were continued.

=== Slum rent control in NYC (1939-1943) ===
The City-Wide Tenants League was formed as a result of the 1934 Knickerbocker Village rent strikes. It and other housing and tenant organizations were successful in lobbying for the passage of the Minkoff Act of 1939, which prohibited rent increases in old law tenements not complying with the Multiple Dwellings Act, which effectively acted as a form of rent control for low-income tenants since over 90% of old law tenements contained violations. The CWTL later changed its name to the United Tenants League. The law lapsed in 1943, after being extended in 1940.

=== Federal regulation (1943–1950) ===
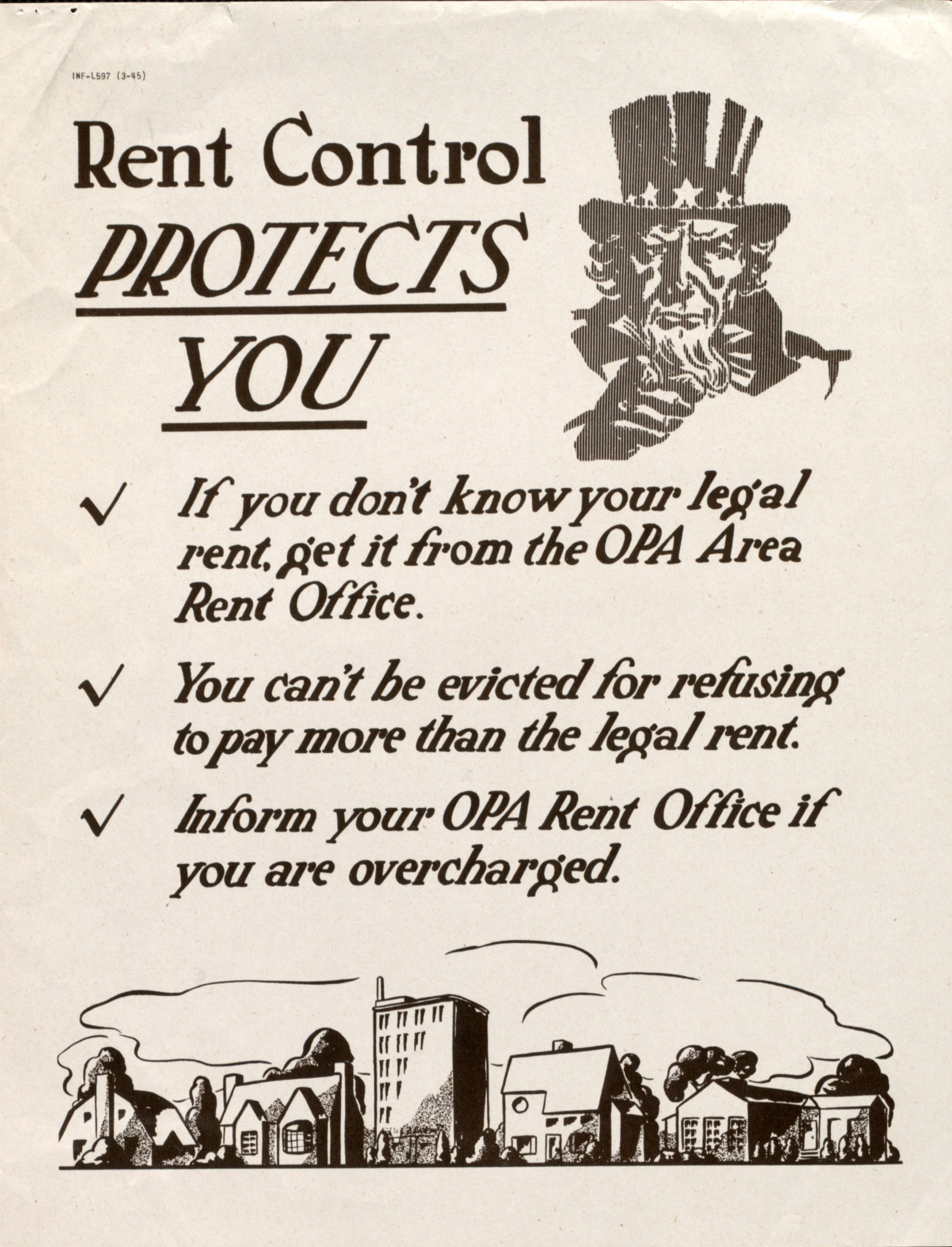
OPA-created wartime informational poster

In 1942, President Franklin D. Roosevelt signed the Emergency Price Control Act into law. The goal of the act was to prevent inflation in the booming, fully employed wartime economy by setting price controls nationwide.

Following this the UTL, the Citizens Housing Council, and Consumer organizations pressed Mayor La Guardia to have the Office of Price Administration (OPA) freeze rents in the city. La Guardia did make this request but initially the OPA refused on the basis of the city's vacancy rate, 7.5% as of 1940, being too high to justify controls. However, this became a rallying point for the civil organizations, with a diverse and large amount of organizational pressure placed on the OPA to institute rent controls in NYC.

On November 1, 1943, the OPA froze New York rents at their March 1, 1943, levels, after which tenant associations, ALP Clubs, and tenant unions focused on OPA as a major reference point for tenant complaints, as those groups began serving as a de-facto vigilant committees to enforce the edict. New York's current rent control program began in 1943. It is the longest-running in the United States.

When the Emergency Price Control Act expired in 1947, Congress passed the Federal Housing and Rent Act of 1947, which exempted construction after February 1, 1947, from rent controls, but continued that regulation for properties already completed by that date. It also detailed a process of rent decontrol, overseen by state boards, but protests in New York delayed attempts at rent decontrol by the board.

=== State regulation (1950–1962) ===
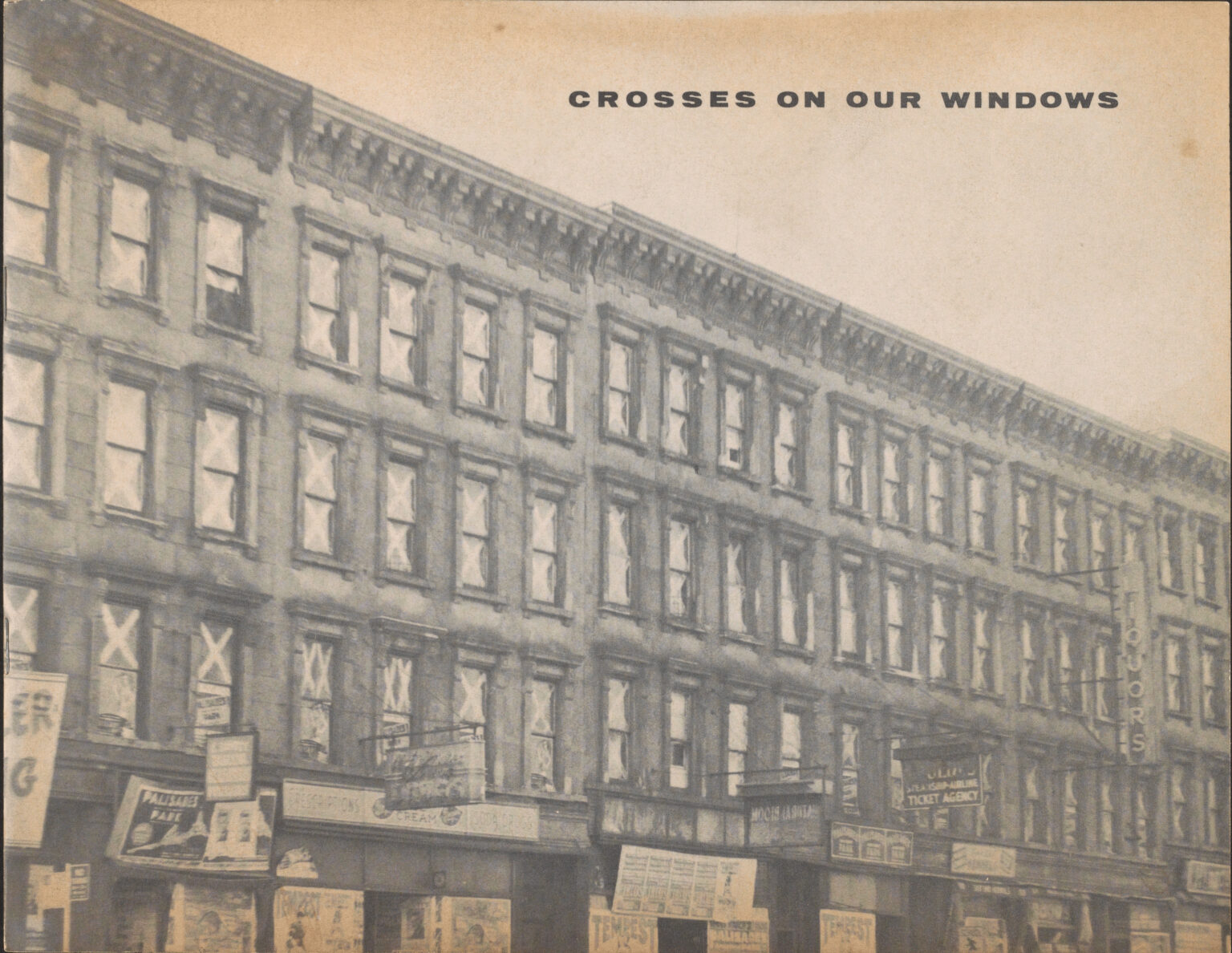
Cover of 1963 Yorkville Save Our Homes group publication to protest and document the destruction during urban renewal. Homes slated for demolition were marked with white crosses on their windows.

The state of New York took over when federal regulation ended in 1950, passing a law that retained rent caps, managed by a state board. Compared to the OPA, it was weak with many loopholes; however it still was tenant victory compared to the rest of the nation.

Under the first permanent state laws in 1951, New York took a similar regulatory approach as the federal government. At the time there were about 2,500,000 rental units statewide, 85% of them in New York City. The initial laws covered all rental units and regulated all relationships between owners and tenants concerning rents, services, and evictions.

Into the 1950s, a severe housing shortage prompted the first deregulation of rental units. The housing shortage had been primarily caused by the Title I 'slum clearance' program which rapidly reduced the housing units available in the city. In New York City, apartments in single and two-family homes became deregulated after April 1, 1953. Cities and towns outside New York City were given permission to deregulate when ready. The most expensive luxury apartments in New York City began to be deregulated starting in 1958. By 1961, only New York City and 18 of New York's 57 other counties had rent regulation.

When state rent control was set to expire in 1961, it was faced with fierce protest by different tenant advocacy groups within NYC. One such group was the Metropolitan Council on Housing in 1959, formed initially to oppose the neighborhood razing done by the city administration. In 1961, the Met-Council led mass demonstrations in the city and sent 1,500 protestors to Albany to advocate for the saving of rent control. This led to an extension package being passed by the state legislature.

=== Mixed regulation (1962–1984) ===
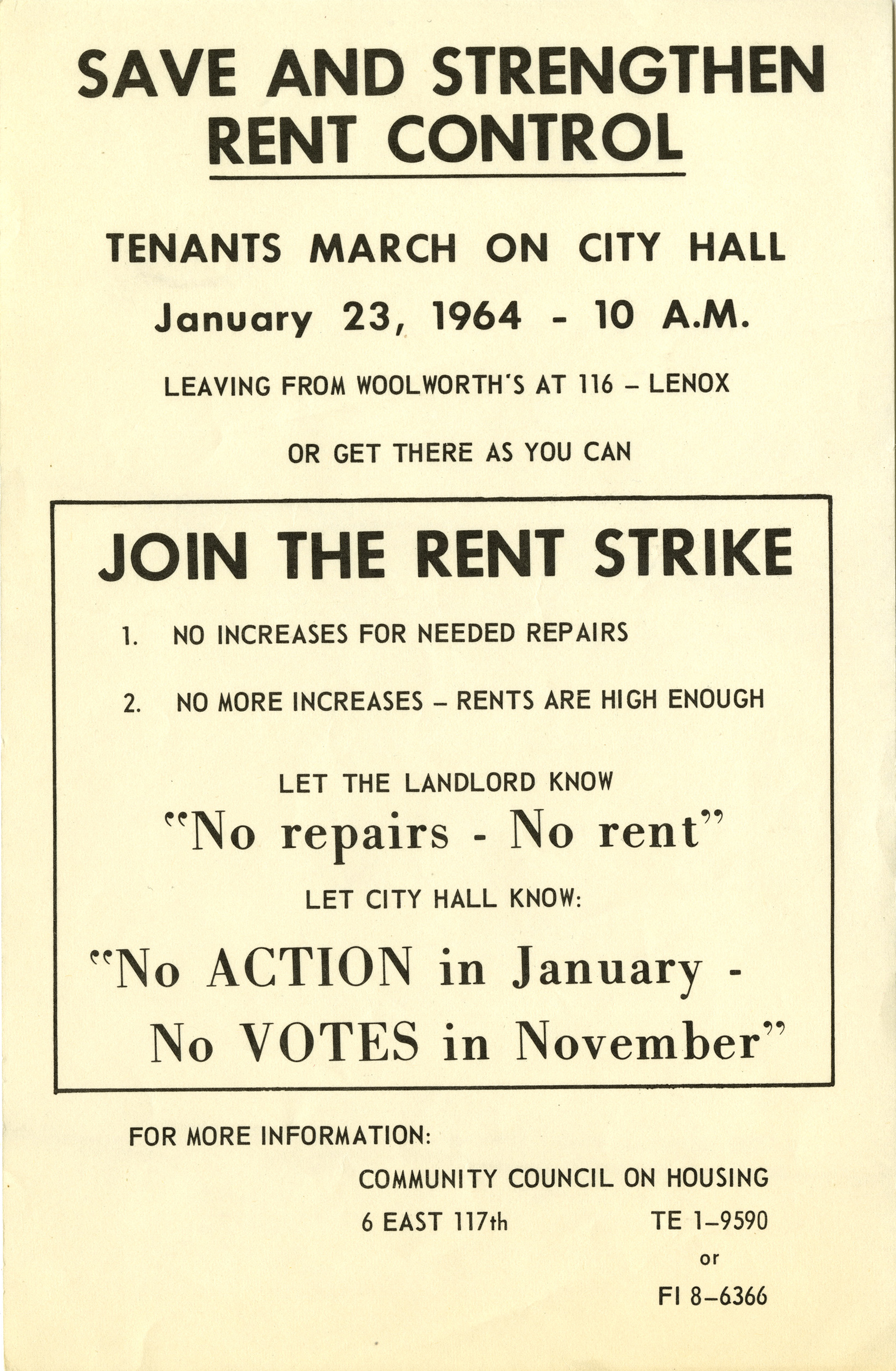
“Save and Strengthen Rent Control” flyer from the Community Council on Housing; 1964 Brooklyn Referencing the 1963-1964 NYC rent strikes

New York City and the state government began dual administration of rent regulation in 1962, and 75,000 expensive apartments were gradually deregulated by 1968. In 1969, construction and vacancy rates slumped, causing non-regulated rents to rise nationally. This rapid increase in rents caused New York to pass the Rent Stabilization Law of 1969, which introduced rent stabilization to units built after the 1947 cutoff for buildings to be eligible for rent control, covering approximately 325,000 units in New York City. The Emergency Tenant Protection Act of 1974 (ETPA) expanded rent stabilization to other parts of New York State.

The Local Law 30 of 1970 introduced a new method of rent control price calculation, based on the Maximum Base Rate, which adapted to the changing costs faced by landlords, allowing them to pass those costs on to renters. A 1971 law took away New York City's ability to regulate rents and gave the power to the state government.

The Omnibus Housing Act of 1983 transferred the responsibilities for rent regulation in New York City from the New York City Conciliation and Appeals Board (CAB) to the New York State Division of Housing and Community Renewal (DHCR) effective April 1984.

=== State regulation (1984–present) ===
The passage of the Rent Regulation Reform Act of 1997 restricted rent stabilization to apartments for which the legal, or stabilized, rent was under $2,000 per month. The decontrol rent was set at $2,000. The decontrol income was $175,000.

In June 2011, the New York State Legislature enacted the Rent Act of 2011. It did the following:

- Limited vacancy increases to once a year
- Reduced the permanent rent increase in buildings of 35 units or more for individual apartment improvements to 1/60th instead of 1/40th of the cost
- Increased the minimum rent for deregulation of an apartment to $2,500
- Increased the household income to $200,000 for deregulating an occupied apartment with a rent of at least $2,500

In June 2015, the New York State Legislature enacted the Rent Act of 2015. Rent laws were extended four more years through 2019.

- Increased the minimum rent for high-rent or high-income deregulation of an apartment to $2,700, which will be adjusted each year by the one-year increase allowed by the Rent Guidelines Board. The minimum rent for deregulation now is achieved following the prior lease and not as a result of a vacancy increase or improvements to unit or buildings after vacancy.
- Created a stepped vacancy increase for a two-year lease of 5% if vacant less than two years, 10% if vacant less than three years, 15% if vacant less than four years, 20% if vacant four or more years. The vacancy increase for a one-year lease is less by the approved percentage difference in lease increases between one- and two-year leases.
- Changed the amortization period for major capital improvements from 84 months to 96 months in buildings with less than 35 units and changed the amortization period for major capital improvements from 84 months to 108 months in buildings with 35 or more units.

The New York State Legislature enacted the Housing Stability and Tenant Protection Act of 2019 in June of that year.

- Makes the rent regulation system permanent, so they will not sunset at any time in the future without an act of the Legislature to repeal or terminate them.
- Repeals the provisions that allow the removal of units from rent stabilization when the rent crosses a statutory high-rent threshold and the unit becomes vacant or the tenant's income is $200,000 or higher in the preceding two years.
- Limits the use of the "owner use" provision to a single unit, requires that the owner or their immediate family use the unit as their primary residence, and protects long-term tenants from eviction under this exception by reducing the current length of tenancy required to be protected from eviction to 15 years.
- Limits the temporary non-profit exception to rent stabilization by requiring units to remain rent-stabilized if they are provided to individuals who are or were homeless or are at risk of homelessness. Provides individuals permanently or temporarily housed by nonprofits status as tenants while ensuring that units used for these purposes remain rent stabilized.
- Repeals the "vacancy bonus" provision that allows a property owner to raise rents as much as 20 percent each time a unit becomes vacant. Repeals the "longevity bonus" provision that allows rents to be raised by additional amounts based on the duration of the previous tenancy. Prohibits local Rent Guidelines Boards from reinstating vacancy bonus on their own.
- Prohibits Rent Guidelines Boards from setting additional increases based on the current rental cost of a unit or the amount of time since the owner was authorized to take additional rent increases, such as a vacancy bonus.
- Prohibits owners who have offered tenants a "preferential rent" below the legal regulated rent from raising the rent to the full legal rent upon renewal. Once the tenant vacates, the owner can charge any rent up to the full legal regulated rent, so long as the tenant did not vacate due to the owner's failure to maintain the unit in habitable condition. Owners with rent-setting regulatory agreements with federal or state agencies will still be permitted to use preferential rents based on their particular agreements.
- Sets Maximum Collectible Rent increases for rent controlled tenants at the average of the five most recent Rent Guidelines Board annual rent increases for one-year renewals. This bill also prohibits fuel pass-along charges.
- Extends the four-year look-back period to six or more years as reasonably necessary to determine a reliable base rent, extends the period for which an owner can be liable for rent overcharge claims from two to six years, and no longer allows owners to avoid treble damages if they voluntarily return the amount of the rent overcharge prior to a decision being made by a court or Housing and Community Renewal (HCR). Allows tenants to assert their overcharge claims in court or at HCR and states that while an owner may discard records after six years, they do so at their own risk.
- Lowers the rent increase cap for Major Capital Improvements (MCIs) from six percent to two percent in New York City and from 15 percent to two percent in other counties. Provides the same protections of the two percent cap going forward on MCI rent increases attributable to MCIs that became effective within the prior seven years. Lowers increases further by lengthening the MCI formula's amortization period. Eliminates MCI increases after 30 years instead of allowing them to remain in effect permanently. Significantly tightens the rules governing what spending may qualify for MCI increases and tightens enforcement of those rules by requiring that 25 percent of MCIs be inspected and audited.
- Caps the amount of IAI spending at $15,000 over a 15-year period and allows owners to make up to three IAIs during that time. Makes IAI increases temporary for 30 years rather than permanent and requires owners to clear any hazardous violations in the apartment before collecting an increase.
- Requires HCR to submit an annual report on the programs and activities undertaken by the Office of Rent Administration and the Tenant Protection Unit regarding implementation, administration and enforcement of the rent regulation system. The report will also include data points regarding the number of rent stabilized units within each county, application and approvals for major capital improvements, units with preferential rents, rents charged, and overcharge complaints.
- Strengthens and makes permanent the system that protects tenants in buildings that owners seek to convert into co-ops or condos. Eliminates the option of "eviction plans" and institutes reforms for non-eviction plans. Requires 51 percent of tenants in residence to agree to purchase apartments before the conversion can be effective. (Currently 15 percent of apartments must be sold and the purchasers may be outside investors.) For market-rate senior citizens and disabled tenants during conversion, evictions are permitted only for good cause, where an unconscionable rent increase does not constitute good cause.
- Removes the geographical restrictions on the applicability of the rent stabilization laws, allowing any municipality that otherwise meets the statutory requirements (e.g., less than five percent vacancy in the housing stock to be regulated) to opt into rent stabilization.

== Warehousing ==
Because rent regulation limits the amount of rent a landlord can legally collect from tenants, some landlords warehouse their rent regulated units and avoid advertising vacancies. With the passing of the New York's Housing Stability and Tenant Protection Act of 2019, landlords are no longer able to legally increase rent upon vacancy in rent stabilized units; previously, landlords were legally allowed to raise rents up to 20% between tenants to recoup construction cost. Many landlords do not fill their vacant rent stabilized units, as the operational and renovation costs may exceed the legal maximum rent. As of 2025, there are over 50,000 vacant rent stabilized apartments in New York City out of a total of 960,000 rent stabilized apartments.

== Frankensteining ==
Frankensteining was a legal loophole which allowed landlords to convert rent regulated units into market rate units. By combining a rent regulated unit with another unit (either combining a market rate unit with a rent regulated unit or merging multiple rent regulated units), landlords could collect market rate rent. In 2023, New York lawmakers passed a bill banning the practice.

== Illegal deregulation ==
Until the high-rent threshold was abolished in 2019, it was possible to (often by dubious means) remove rent-regulated or rent-controlled status from apartments in New York, converting them into market rate units. Illegal deregulation sometimes occurs when landlords inflate the costs of renovations or improvements to justify raising the rent of a rent-regulated apartment to a level that exceeds the deregulation threshold. Under rent regulation laws, landlords are allowed to increase the rent of a rent-regulated apartment if they make significant improvements or renovations to the unit (1/40th of renovation costs can be added to the rent price). The cost of these improvements can be passed on to tenants in the form of higher rent. When the rent exceeds a certain threshold, the apartment can be deregulated, meaning it no longer falls under rent control or rent stabilization laws and can be rented at market rates.

== New York City ==
=== Rental unit distribution ===
	2002		2005		2008		2011		2017		2023	
Type	Units	% of units	Units	% of units	Units	% of units	Units	% of units	Units	% of units	Units	% of units
Non-regulated	665.0k	31.9%	697.4k	33.3%	772.7k	36.0%	849.8k	39.1%	936.0k	42.9%	1.12m	48.2%
Rent controlled	59.3k	2.8%	43.3k	2.1%	39.9k	1.9%	38.4k	1.8%	21.8k	1.0%	24.0k	1.0%
Rent stabilized pre-1947	773.7k	37.1%	747.3k	35.7%	717.5k	33.5%	743.5k	34.2%	692.7k	31.7%	N/A	N/A
Rent stabilized post-1946	240.3k	11.5%	296.3k	14.2%	305.8k	14.3%	243.3k	11.2%	273.8k	12.5%	N/A	N/A
Rent stabilized pre-1974											779.0k	33.5%
Rent stabilized post-1973											181.7k	7.8%
Other regulated	346.5k	16.6%	308.0k	14.7%	308.6k	14.4%	297.6k	13.7%	258.0k	11.8%	220.3k	9.5%
TOTAL	2.09m	100%	2.09m	100%	2.14m	100%	2.17m	100%	2.18m	100%	2.32m	100%

=== Rent Transparency Act (2025) ===
In 2025, the New York City Council enacted Local Law 86, the Rent Transparency Act, sponsored by Council Member Sandy Nurse. The law took effect on January 26, 2026 and is administered by the New York City Department of Housing Preservation and Development (HPD).

The law requires that every multiple dwelling containing one or more rent-stabilized units post a notice in a common area of the building, in both English and Spanish, stating that the building contains rent-stabilized units and explaining how a tenant can determine whether their own unit is among them. The required notice directs tenants to the New York State Division of Housing and Community Renewal (DHCR) and reminds owners of their obligation to file an annual registration with DHCR and to provide each tenant a copy of the registration information pertaining to their unit, noting that owners who fail to file may face penalties. The notice must also display the building address and property registration number.

According to the city, the measure is intended to help the more than two million New Yorkers living in rent-stabilized homes confirm their regulatory status and guard against improper deregulation and overcharges. HPD makes the required signage available to landlords in English, Spanish, and additional languages.

== Rent Guidelines Board Apartment Orders ==
This section reproduces the chart as published by the New York City Rent Guidelines Board regarding limits set on rent increases for regulated units within the five boroughs of New York City.

=== Orders 58–54 ===
Order	Effective Dates	1‑Year Renewal	2‑Year Renewal	3‑Year Renewal	Vacancy Lease	Electrical	Fair Market Rent Guidelines	Footnotes
58	10/1/26 to 9/30/27	0%	0%	-- See Renewal	See Renewal Lease Guidelines	None	MBR + 49%	
57	10/1/25 to 9/30/26	3.0%	4.5%	-- See Renewal	See Renewal Lease Guidelines	None	MBR + 49%	
56	10/1/24 to 9/30/25	2.75%	5.25%	-- See Renewal	See Renewal Lease Guidelines	None	MBR + 49%	
55	10/1/23 to 9/30/24	3.0%	2.75% (1st yr)	-- See Renewal	3.2% (2nd yr)	None	MBR + 27%	1: Lease Guidelines; 2, 3
54	10/1/22 to 9/30/23	3.25%	5.0%	-- See Renewal	None	--	MBR + 27%	Lease Guidelines 2, 3

=== Orders 53–43 ===
Order	Effective Dates	1‑Year Renewal	2‑Year Renewal	3‑Year Renewal	Vacancy Lease	Electrical	Fair Market Rent Guidelines	Footnotes
53	10/1/21 to 9/30/22	0.0% (1st 6 mos)	2.5%	-- See Renewal	1.5% (last 6 mos)	None	MBR + 39%	Lease Guidelines 2, 3
52	10/1/20 to 9/30/21	0.0%	0.0% (1st yr)	-- See Renewal	1.0% (2nd yr)	None	MBR + 39%	Lease Guidelines 2, 3
51	10/1/19 to 9/30/20	1.5%	2.5%	--	--2	None	MBR + 39%	
50	10/1/18 to 9/30/19	1.5%	2.5%	--	--4, 5	None	MBR + 39%	
49	10/1/17 to 9/30/18	1.25%	2.0%	--	--4, 5	None	MBR + 33%	
48	10/1/16 to 9/30/17	0.0%	2.0%	--	--4, 5	None	MBR + 33%	
47	10/1/15 to 9/30/16	0.0%	2.0%	--	--4, 5	None	Greater of MBR + 33% or H.U.D.'s Fair Market Rent 6	
46	10/1/14 to 9/30/15	1.0%	2.75%	--	--4, 5	None	Greater of MBR + 30% or H.U.D.'s Fair Market Rent 6	
45	10/1/13 to 9/30/14	4.0%	7.75%	--	--4, 5	None	Greater of MBR + 30% or H.U.D.'s Fair Market Rent 6	
44	10/1/12 to 9/30/13	2% or $20, 4% or $40	--	--4, 5	None	–	Greater of MBR + 30% (whichever is greater) or H.U.D.'s Fair Market Rent 6	
43	10/1/11 to 9/30/12	3.75%	7.25%	--	--4, 5	None	Greater of MBR + 30% or H.U.D.'s Fair Market Rent 6	

=== Orders 42–32 ===
Order	Effective Dates	1‑Year Renewal	2‑Year Renewal	3‑Year Renewal	Vacancy Lease	Electrical	Fair Market Rent Guidelines	Footnotes
42	10/1/10 to 9/30/11	2.25%	4.5%	--	--4, 5	None	Greater of MBR + 50% or H.U.D.'s Fair Market Rent 6	
41	10/1/09 to 9/30/10	3.0%	7%	6.0%	7	--4, 5	None	Also: 2.5% (8); 5.0% (8); or H.U.D.'s Fair Market Rent 6
40	10/1/08 to 9/30/09	4.5%	7%	8.5%	7	--4, 5	None	Also: 4.0% (8); 8.0% (8); or H.U.D.'s Fair Market Rent 6
39	10/1/07 to 9/30/08	3%	5.75%	--	--4, 5	None	Greater of MBR + 50% or H.U.D.'s Fair Market Rent 6	
38	10/1/06 to 9/30/07	4.25%	7%	7.25%	7	--4, 5	None	Also: 3.75% (8); 6.75% (8); or H.U.D.'s Fair Market Rent 6
37	10/1/05 to 9/30/06	2.75%	7%	5.5%	7	--4, 5	None	Also: 2.25% (8); 4.5% (8); or H.U.D.'s Fair Market Rent 6
36	10/1/04 to 9/30/05	3.5%	7%	6.5%	7	--4, 5	None	Also: 3% (8); 6% (8); or H.U.D.'s Fair Market Rent 6
35	10/1/03 to 9/30/04	4.5%	7.5%	--	--4, 5	None	Greater of MBR + 50% or H.U.D.'s Fair Market Rent 6	
34	10/1/02 to 9/30/03	2%	4%	--	--4, 5	None	Greater of MBR + 50% or H.U.D.'s Fair Market Rent 6	
33	10/1/01 to 9/30/02	4%	6%	--	--4, 5	None	Greater of MBR + 150% + Fuel Adjustments or H.U.D.’s Fair Market Rent 6	
32	10/1/00 to 9/30/01	4%	6%	--	--4, 5	None	Greater of MBR + 150% + Fuel (Rent ≤$500, add $15; Rent <$215 becomes $215) Adjustments or H.U.D.’s Fair Market Rent 6	

=== Orders 31–21 ===
Order	Effective Dates	1‑Year Renewal	2‑Year Renewal	3‑Year Renewal	Vacancy Lease	Electrical	Fair Market Rent Guidelines	Footnotes
31	10/1/99 to 9/30/00	2%	4%	--	--4, 9	None	Greater of MBR + 150% + Fuel (Rent ≤$500, add $15; Rent <$215 becomes $215)	In subleases: 0% allowable increase
30	10/1/98 to 9/30/99	2%	4%	--	--4, 10	None	Greater of MBR + 80% + Fuel (Rent <$450, add $15) or $650	
29	10/1/97 to 9/30/98	2%	4%	--	--4, 10	None	Greater of MBR + 40% + Fuel (Rent ≤$400, add $15) adjustment or MCR + 50%	
28	10/1/96 to 9/30/97	5%	7%	-- 9%	13	None	Greater of MBR + 40% + Fuel (Rent ≤$400, add $20); if no other vacancy allowance this guideline year, adjustment or MCR + 50% + Fuel Adjustment	
27	10/1/95 to 9/30/96	2%	4%	-- 8.5%	13	None	Greater of 35% above MBR or 45% above the MCR	(Rent ≤$400, add $20)
26	10/1/94 to 9/30/95	2%	4%	-- 10% or 5%	13, 14	None	Greater of 35% above MBR or 40% above the MCR	(Rent <$400, add $15)
25	10/1/93 to 9/30/94	3%	5%	-- 5, 3, or 0%	13, 16	None	MCR + 40% (5% for rents < $500, 3% for rents ≥ $500 and < $1000, 0% for rents ≥ $1000)	
24	10/1/92 to 9/30/93	3%	5%	-- 5%	13	None	MBR + 15% + Fuel Adjustment	
23	10/1/91 to 9/30/92	4%	6.5%	-- 5%	13	None	MBR + 15% + Fuel Adjustment	
22	10/1/90 to 9/30/91	4.5%	7%	-- 5%	13	None	MCR + 35% + Fuel Adjustment	
21	10/1/89 to 9/30/90	5.5%	9%	-- 12%	13	None	Greater of 25% above (Rent < $325, add $5) 17 MBR or 45% above MCR; Caps: Renewal Lease – $342.88 (1 yr), $354.25 (2 yr); Vacancy Lease – $381.88 (1 yr), $393.25 (2 yr) + Fuel Adjustment	

=== Orders 20–1 ===
Order	Effective Dates	1‑Year Renewal	2‑Year Renewal	3‑Year Renewal	Vacancy Lease	Electrical	Fair Market Rent Guidelines	Footnotes	
20	10/1/88 to 9/30/89	6%	9%	-- 12%	13	None	Greater of 25% above (Rent < $325, add $5) 18 MBR or 45% above MCR; Caps: Renewal Lease – $334.75 (1 yr), $346.13 (2 yr); Vacancy Lease – $367.25 (1 yr), $378.63 (2 yr)		
19	10/1/87 to 9/30/88	3%	6.5%	-- 10%	19	None	1986 MBR (Rent < $325, add $10); if no vacancy allowance taken + Fuel Adjustment + 35%		
18	10/1/86 to 9/30/87	6%	9%	-- 7.5%	19	None	1986 MBR (Rent < $350, add $15) + Fuel Adjustment + 20%; Caps: Renewal Lease – $371.00 (1 yr), $381.50 (2 yr); Vacancy Lease – $397.25 (1 yr), $407.75 (2 yr)		
17	10/1/85 to 9/30/86	4%	6.5%	-- 7.5%	19	None	1984 MBR (Rent < $300, add $15) + Fuel Adjustment + 20%; Caps: Renewal Lease – $312 (1 yr), $319.50 (2 yr); Vacancy Lease – $334.50 (1 yr), $342.00 (2 yr)		
16	10/1/84 to 9/30/85	6%	9%	--23 7.5%	19	None	1984 MBR (Rent < $250, add $10) + Fuel Adjustment + 15%		
15	10/1/83 to 9/30/84	4%	7%	10%	0, 5, 10, or 15%	25 Minus 1%	1982 MBR + Fuel Adj. + 20% (Rent < $200, add $10)	26	
14	10/1/82 to 9/30/83	4%	7%	10%	None	Minus 1%	1982 MBR + Fuel Adj + 15%		
13	10/1/81 to 9/30/82	27; 10%; 7; 13%; 7; 16%; 7; 15%; 4%; 20% above 1980 MBR	6.5% (8); 9.5% (8); 12.5% (8)	--	--	--	20% above 1980 MBR	27 – Starting with Order #13, rent increases are based on the legal rent in effect on September 30 prior to the guideline period.	
12, 12a	7/1/80 to 6/30/81	28; 11% (7); 14% (7); 17% (7); 5%; 29, 10% (30); 1.5% – 15% above 1980 MBR	5% (8); 7% (8); 9% (8); 15% (31)	--	--	--	15% above 1980 MBR	28 – This guideline period is for 15 months; 30 – If no change in tenancy since 7/1/75; 29 – If tenancy changed; 31 – Vacancy increase over 6/30/81 rent for new leases between 7/1/81 and 9/30/81.	
11, 11a, 11b	7/1/79 to 6/30/80	8.5%	12%	15%	5%	33 or 15% (34)	20% above 1978 MBR	32 – A fuel surcharge of $8 per month is in effect one year from lease start (for leases between 7/1/79 and 6/30/80)	
10b,c,d,e	7/1/78 to 6/30/79	2.5%	35	2%	35	0.5%	10%	36 – In addition to the base adjustment under Order #10a, fuel adjustments for 1-,2-,3‑year leases apply effective 3/1/79; see Orders #10c,d,e	
10, 10a	7/1/78 to 6/30/79	4.5%	6.5%	8.5%	5%	0.5%	15% above 1978 MBR		
9	7/1/77 to 6/30/78	6.5%	8.5%	11.5%	5%	4%	20% above 1976 MBR	37 – Only if no electrical inclusion was previously taken.	
8	7/1/76 to 6/30/77	6.5%	8%	11.0%	5%	3.5%	15% above 1976 MBR	38 – Special adjustments apply for the first renewal of decontrolled apartments under the Vacancy Decontrol Law.	
7	7/1/75 to 6/30/76	7.5%	9.5%	12.5%	5%	3.5%	22.5% above 1974 MBR		
6,6a,6b,6c	7/1/74 to 6/30/75	8.5%	10.5%	12%	None	2.5%	15% above 1974 MBR	39 – Applies only to leases starting on/after 9/1/74.	
5	7/1/73 to 6/30/74	6.5%	8.5%	10.5%	5%	41	None	Vacancy Decontrol was in effect from 7/1/71 to 6/30/74; 41 – For apartments vacated before 6/30/71 and not subject to Vacancy Decontrol Law.	
4	7/1/72 to 6/30/73	42	6%	8%	10%	5%	41	None	42 – Renewal lease guidelines include a separate "stabilizer" of 0.5%.
3	7/1/71 to 6/30/72	43	7%	9%	12%	10%	41	None	43 – Renewal lease guidelines include a separate "stabilizer" of 1.0%.
2	7/1/70 to 6/30/71	44	6%	8%	11%	7.5%	None	44 – Renewal lease guidelines include a separate "stabilizer" of 1.0%.	
1	7/1/68 to 6/30/70	10%	45	10%	15%	5%	46 or 10%	47	45 – One‑year lease extension may be requested; 46 – For two‑year leases; 47 – For three‑year leases.

== See also ==
- Law of New York
- Real Estate Board of New York
- 421-a tax exemption
