= United Tenants League =

New York tenants association, 1942–1945

- Predecessor: City-Wide Tenants Council (1936–1942)
- Founded: February 1942
- Dissolved: 1945
- Headquarters: New York City
- Location: United States

The United Tenants League of Greater New York (UTL), was a tenant association representing tenants across the New York Metro Area, consisting of a federation of tenant unions. It was most influential as its predecessor, the City Wide Tenants Council, lobbying for the passage of Housing Act of 1937, Minkoff Act of 1939, and the development of public housing projects within NYC.

During its UTL period it was less singularly influential on tenant issues but was joined by a broader coalition in the movement, which collectively successful pushed for the imposition of OPA rent controls within NYC. It then eventually waned in influence, and disintegrated sometime in 1945.

== Background ==
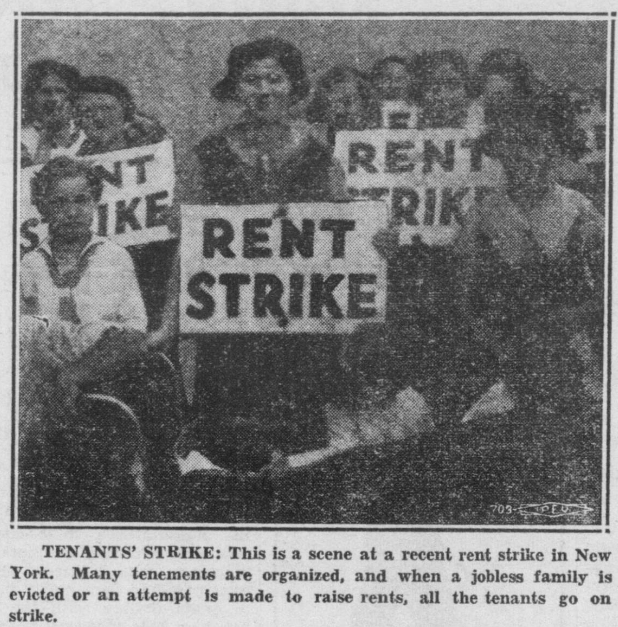
"Tenants' Strike", Daily Worker Published June 18, 1934 Date of strike unknown.

Prior to the formation of the City-Wide Tenants Council, the predecessor to the United Tenants League, New York City had experienced an upsurge in tenant organizing and rent strikes by the US Communist Party's unemployed councils in response to the crisis of the Great Depression. Which set the stage for the later organizers that ran their own rent strikes in the summer of 1934, first in Harlem and then Knickerbocker Village.

=== Harlem ===
The Harlem rent strike occurred first, with tenants facing poor building maintenance and rents nearly twice that of the former white tenants that lived in the building. In this process they formed the (Harlem) (Note: added to prevent confusion with the later bigger UTL) United Tenants League (HUTL). They ended up winning victories in all the buildings they had organized by mid-September, 1934 through the use of vast tenant support and mass picketing. With owners agreeing to reductions of $3 to $10 (Equivalent to $72 to $241 in 2025) a month plus repairs.

Then in October, they formed a permanent joint organization, known as the Consolidated Tenants League (CTL) alongside the NY Tenants League who had organized rent strikes in 150th Street. By 1938 the CTL claimed over 5,000 dues pay members.

=== Knickerbocker ===
Later on October 1, 1934, the Knickerbocker Village rent strike occurred, in a complex that had been advertised as a model project for middle-class New Yorkers. However, after moving in the tenants found the buildings unfinished, with the elevators not working and a slew of amenities which had been advertised to them also inoperable or poorly equipped. Over six hundreds of the tenants voted to rent strike on October 1; and by mid-November Knickerbocker Village management agreed to negotiate a compromise which resulted in repairs of the unfinished apartment and nearly $25,000 in reimbursements to the upset tenants. A week later after the victory, the tenants announced the formation of the Knickerbocker Village Tenants Association (KVTA). The apartment management responded to the formation with fierce retaliation, which backfired and only widened the KVTA's membership and now with a more oppositional stance.

== Predecessor ==
In March 1936, the City-Wide Tenants League (CWTL) was formed by the KVTA.

They gained the support of the CTL and invited 18 other tenant associations to the meeting for its formation at Mecca Temple. 2,000 participants ended up attending and 500 signed cards showing interest in joining. Originally the CWTL had a direct membership structure which put it in conflict with the CTL, who resented that, seeing it as a potential threat to their individual membership fees. However, in the fall of 1936 the CWTL changed the structure to instead be a federation of self-governing neighborhood associations.

The CWTL also worked to promote the organization of tenant associations in slum neighborhoods such as in the Lower East Side. This led to the creation of the East Side Tenants Unions. In several cases that year the CWTL fought against slum clearance evictions, calling for repairs instead and pushed for more long-term solutions for low-income tenants such as a proposed Tenants Housing Program. Including pushing for payment by the Emergency Relief Bureau of moving expense of those forced to leave, greater intervention by the city to ensure habitable conditions, large scale construction of low-rent public housing, and for the passage of laws prohibiting racial discrimination.

In December 1936, the group changed its name to the City-Wide Tenants Council (CWTC), with a reorganization to have its charter members be: The Consolidated Tenants League, The Brooklyn Rentpayers, the East Side Tenants Union, the Knickerbocker Village Tenants Association and Lower East Side Public Housing Conference.

In 1937 the CWTC grew further, adding ten new affiliates, and becoming a recognized voice of tenant interests. Its growth heavily relied on its volunteer and organizer labor. The CWTC did use legalistic court strategies, but without a fear of employing more confrontational non-legalistic tactics such as mass picketing and rent strikes when they failed, unlike many prior tenant organizations in the city historically. The organization readily utilized the activist connections it had to the US Communist Party network whenever a tenant conflict went unresolved by legalistic means and entered its more militant stage, which proved effective. Almost every CWTC neighborhood affiliate had a working relationship with the a local unit of the Worker Alliance.

=== Housing Act of 1937 ===
In 1937, the CWTC lobbied successfully alongside other public housing advocates for the passing of the Housing Act of 1937, which made subsidies and loans available to states that wished to construct low income housing. However a basis for receiving these subsidies was that the housing project was segregated by race.

Then it lobbied a year later for a New York State Constitution public housing amendment. However the state legislature failed to appropriate the $300 Million for public housing the passed constitutional amendment had authorized, even if they had accelerated its construction of low-income housing. The early efforts of the CWTC to push for public housing, while providing some important gains was ultimately limited by state inaction, in the years prior to WW2.

=== Later actions ===
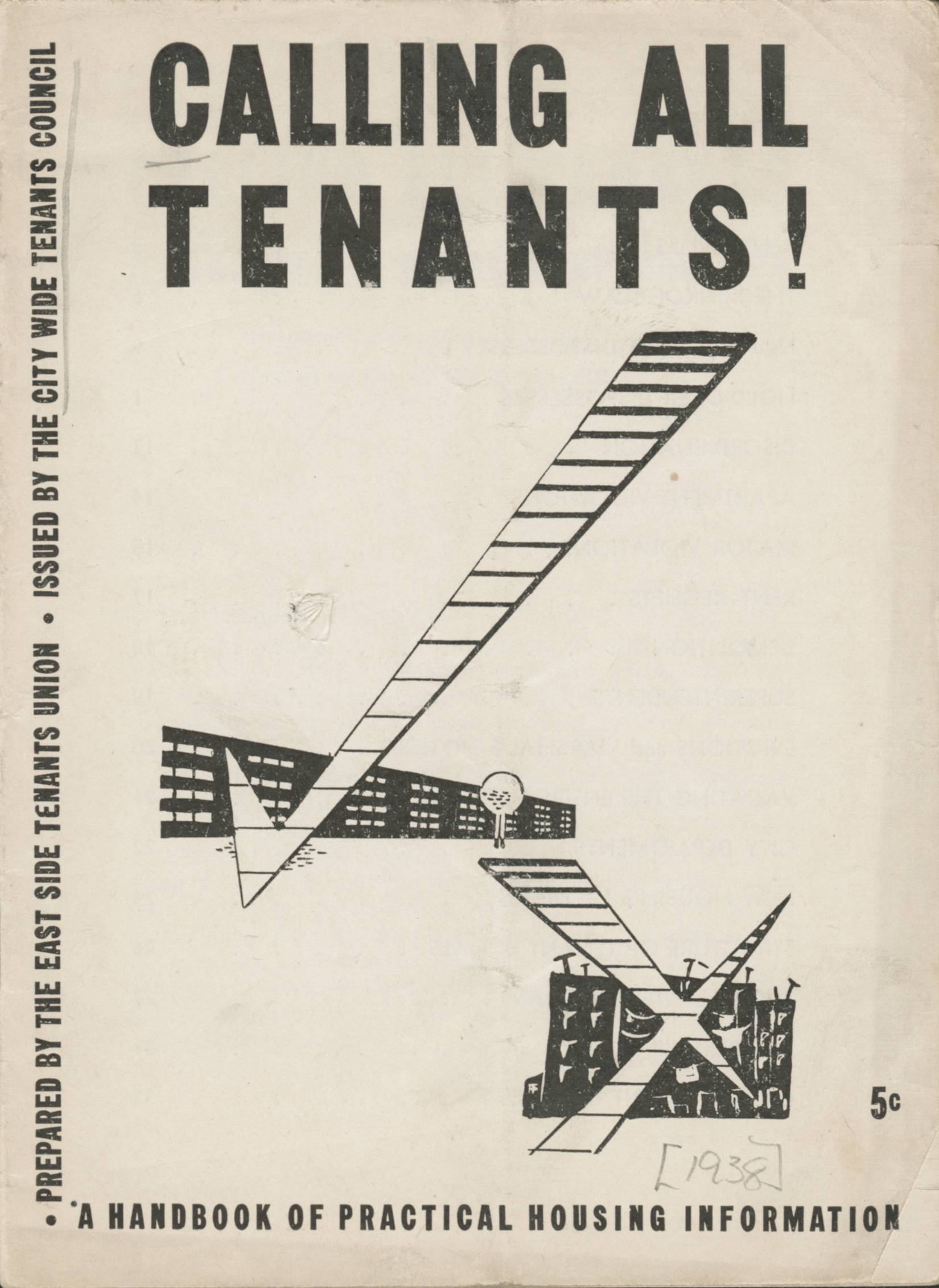

One successful action by the CWTC was lobbying for the passage of the Minkoff Act of 1939, which prohibited rent increases in old law tenements not complying with the Multiple Dwellings Act, which effectively acted as a form of rent control for low-income tenants since over 90% of old law tenements contained violations. The CWTC also successfully lobbied for public housing projects in New York City, where they then formed tenant associations in those newly constructed projects. Some examples include: the Red Hook Houses, Vladeck Houses, Williamsburg Houses and Queensbridge Houses.

== Formation ==
In February 1942, the CWTC renamed itself the United Tenants League, becoming a much smaller organization, as many activists shifted into the WWII war-time left wing consumer movement. With the name change reflective of a change of focus to winning the 'Peoples War', they became less focused on tenant advocacy but instead on a preoccupation on the output of war plants and other consumer actions.

However at the same time as UTL influence became less singularly important, tenant advocacy spread to a wide range of progressive organizations using many of the tactics pioneered by the CWTC/UTL.

=== Emergency Price Control Act of 1942 ===
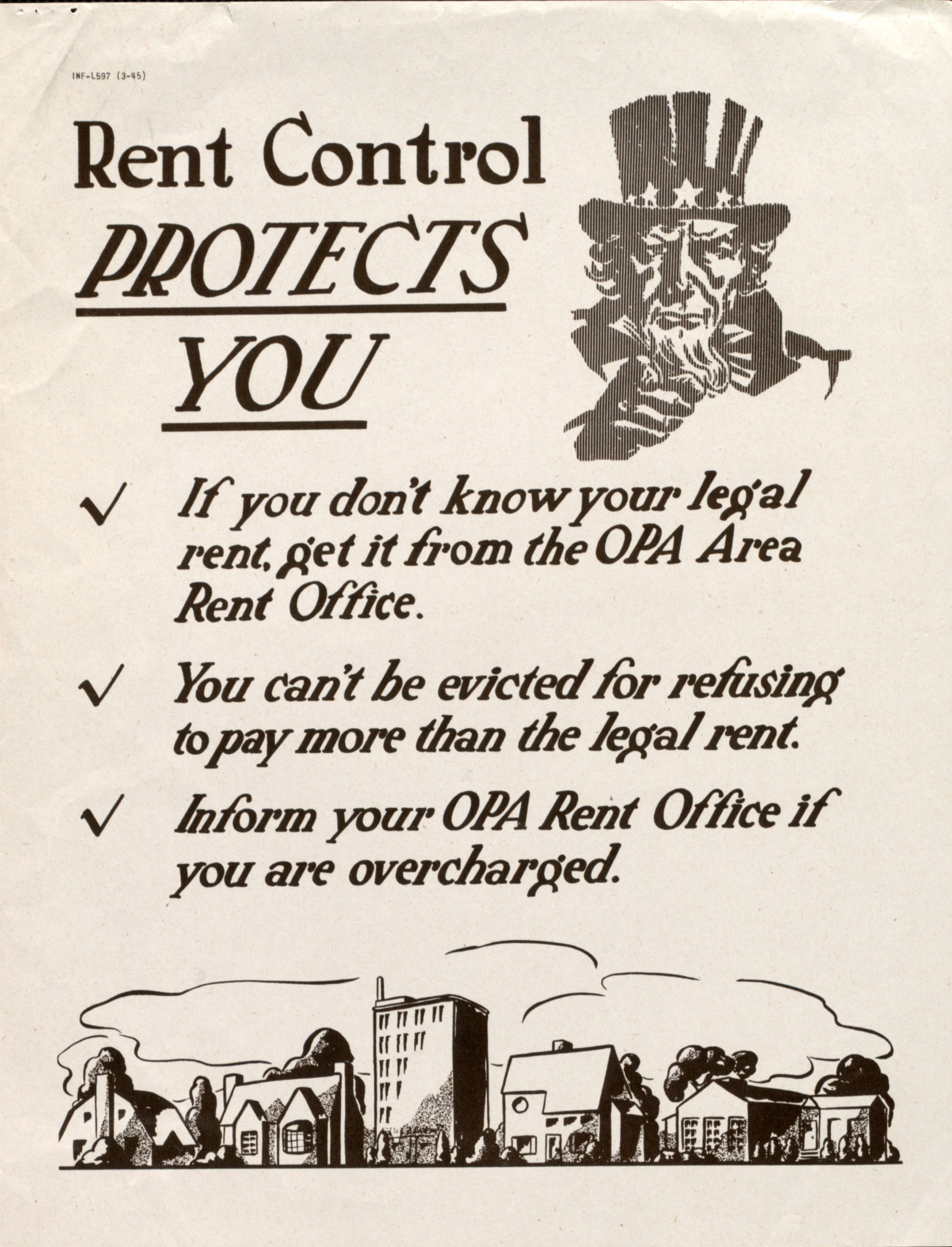
OPA created wartime informational poster

After the passage of the Emergency Price Control Act of 1942, and the establishment of the Office Price Administration (OPA); The UTL, the Citizens Housing Council, and Consumer organizations pressed Mayor La Guardia to have the OPA freeze rents in NYC. La Guardia did make this request but the OPA refused on the basis of the city's vacancy rate, 7.5% as of 1940, being too high to justify controls.

However, this became a rallying point for the civil organizations, with a diverse and large amount of organizational pressure placed on the OPA to institute rent controls. So, on November 1, 1943, the OPA declared NYC a War Rental Area, with mandatory rent ceilings retroactive to March 1, 1943, levels. After which tenant associations, ALP Clubs, and tenant unions focused on OPA as a major reference point for tenant complaints, as they began serving as a de facto vigilant committees to enforce the edict.

=== Public housing redlining ===
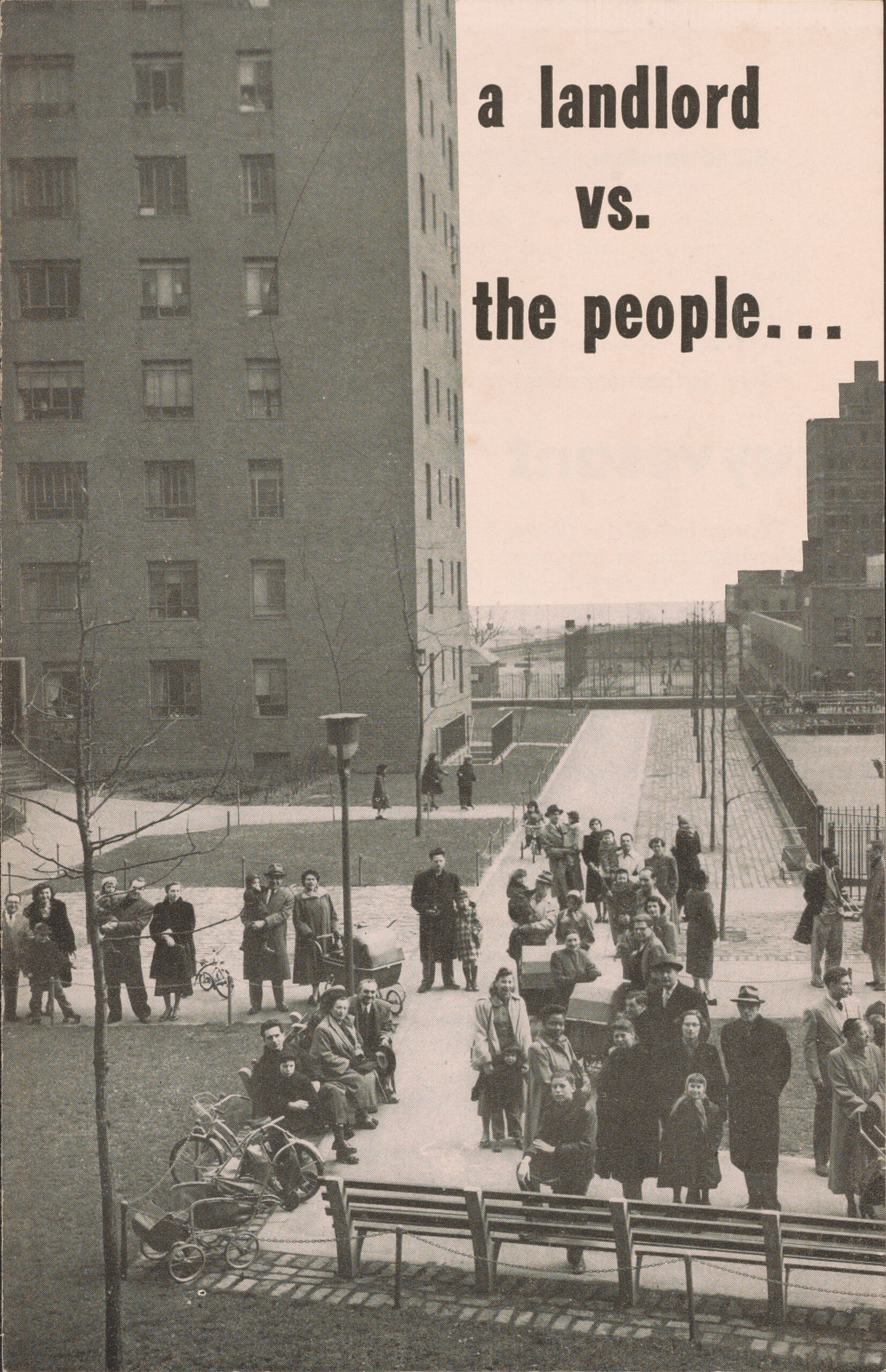
1950 Pamphlet by the Town and Village Committee to End Discrimination in Stuyvesant Town. Depicts 19 families who faced eviction as a result of their involvement in the fight against segregation.

In spring 1943, the Mitchell-Hampton Redevelopment Companies Law was passed by the state legislature, after which the La Guardia Admin & Metropolitan Life Insurance Company revealed Private-Public partnership plan for Stuyvesant Town, a middle-income housing project across the Lower East side that if implemented would displace some 3,800 site families. Groups were outraged by the announcement, over the 'slum clearing' nature of it and its intent to make it a whites only, segregated Jim Crow project. Particularly the City-Wide Citizens Committee on Harlem, United Neighborhood Houses and Citizens Housing Council. While the UTL and Queensbridge Tenants League sent denunciations.

However, after relocation resources being given to the Stuyvesant Tenants, who would be displaced by the projects, and the UTL calling for cooperation with Metlife, this opposition was effectively undercut, with its whites only segregation not being meaningfully materially opposed by enough groups.

However, the fight to end the segregation of Stuyvesant Town continued after it was built and the old residents displaced. The new white residents formed the Village Tenants Committee to End Discrimination in Stuyvesant Town, and started subletting their apartments to Black Americans. Metlife attempted to evict the leaders of this committee in retaliation. 1,800 tenants were a part of the committee and, the groups survey found that 2/3rds of all tenant residents opposed the segregation policy. Lorch, one of the tenants subletting their place to a black family said of it, “Tenants here . . . will fight Jim Crow no matter what the Metropolitan tries to do.”

Eventually with public pressure, and the passage of the NY state Brown-Isaacs law in 1958, banning discrimination in publicly subsidized private housing, Metlife eventually marginally complied with the regulation. However it would be decades before the Brown-Issacs law was enforced with any teeth and as such still remained largely segregated.

== Dissolution ==
With the OPA dominance on managing rent issues for tenants and consumer price controls, alongside the UTL refocusing away from heading tenant issues, the UTL eventually disintegrated sometime during 1945. However, following the end of WW2 a fight began over the continuation of OPA rent controls, something which the CWTC/UTL had originally played a role in pushing for their application inside NYC during the war.

OPA dissolved by May 1947, however rent control continued in New York. In 1947 Congress passed the Federal Housing and Rent Act of 1947 which extended rent control caps with a process of rent decontrol, however this was overseen by state boards, which played in New York renters favor after protests delayed rent decontrol. In 1950 the NY state passed a law that retained rent caps, managed by a state board, compared to the OPA it was weak with many loopholes, however it still was tenant victory compared to the rest of the nation.
