= Yakus =

Yakus is a surname. Notable people with the surname include:

- Milton Yakus (1917–1980), American songwriter
- Shelly Yakus (born 1945), American music engineer and mixer, son of Milton

== See also ==
- Yakus v. United States, 1944 lawsuit
