= Yakus v. United States =

- Supreme Court of the United States

Argued January 7, 1944 Decided March 27, 1944
- Full case name: Albert Yakus v. United States
- Citations: 321 U.S. 414 (more) 64 S. Ct. 660; 88 L. Ed. 834; 1944 U.S. LEXIS 1311

Case history
- Prior: Rottenberg v. United States, 137 F.2d 850 (1st Cir. 1943); cert. granted, 320 U.S. 730 (1943).

Holding
- An administrative agency could “save” an otherwise unconstitutional delegation of power through a narrowing construction that constrains the agency's own discretion.

Court membership
- Chief Justice Harlan F. Stone Associate Justices Owen Roberts · Hugo Black; Stanley F. Reed · Felix Frankfurter; William O. Douglas · Frank Murphy; Robert H. Jackson · Wiley B. Rutledge

Case opinions
- Majority: Stone, joined by Black, Reed, Frankfurter, Douglas, Jackson
- Dissent: Roberts
- Dissent: Rutledge, joined by Murphy

Yakus v. United States, 321 U.S. 414 (1944), was a decision by the United States Supreme Court which upheld congressional power to fetter judicial review and to delegate broad and flexible law-making power to an administrative agency. The case was a constitutional challenge to the Emergency Price Control Act of 1942 which, intended to expedite price control enforcement, conferred on the United States district courts jurisdiction over violations of Office of Price Administration (OPA) regulations made under the act, but excepted judicial power to consider the constitutionality of such regulations. Congress specified that challenges to their validity be initially reviewed under stringent time limitations by the OPA and on appeal exclusively by the Emergency Court of Appeals, a special Article III tribunal in the District of Columbia, and only thereafter by the Supreme Court.

== Background ==
Massachusetts meat dealer Albert Yakus was criminally prosecuted for violating the wholesale beef price ceiling. He had failed to launch a procedurally difficult pre-enforcement attack on the OPA regulations' constitutionality and was barred from collateral challenges during his trial.

== Supreme Court ==
Chief Justice Harlan F. Stone, joined by Justices Hugo Black, Stanley Forman Reed, Felix Frankfurter, William O. Douglas, and Robert H. Jackson, affirmed Yakus' conviction, holding that "so long as there is an opportunity ... for judicial review which satisfies the demands of due process", the bifurcated enforcement and constitutional proceedings were permissible. He held that the potentially unconstitutional delegation of legislative power by Congress could be cured by the administrative agency's exercise of limiting discretion:

The standards prescribed by the present Act, with the aid of the "statement of the considerations" required to be made by the Administrator, are sufficiently definite and precise to enable Congress, the courts and the public to ascertain whether the administrator, in fixing the designated prices, has conformed to those standards. ... Hence we are unable to find in them an unauthorized delegation of legislative power.

Stone also held that "where an injunction is asked which will adversely affect a public interest for whose impairment, even temporarily, an injunction bond cannot compensate, the court may in the public interest withhold relief until a final determination of the rights of the parties, though the postponement may be burdensome to the plaintiff."

=== Dissent ===
Justice Owen Roberts dissented, embracing the nondelegation doctrine argument and arguing that the OPA had exercised unconstitutionally delegated congressional powers.

Justice Wiley Rutledge, joined by Justice Frank Murphy, also dissented, asserting that once Congress conferred jurisdiction, it could not compel the district judges to ignore Marbury v. Madison or violate the Constitution by enforcing criminal sanctions, a statute, or regulations devoid of due process.

== Legacy ==
The decision significantly influenced American administrative law with respect to the nondelegation doctrine. It would be followed by lower courts striking down nondelegation-based challenges to laws for the next fifty years. For instance, a similar incontestability provision reached the Court in Adamo Wrecking Co. v. United States (1978). The Court did not confront constitutional issues, dealing with statutory construction instead, but Lewis Powell questioned the validity of Yakus except as an exercise of war powers.

In Whitman v. American Trucking Association (2001), the Supreme Court challenged Yakus, as Justice Scalia's majority opinion denied that the Court had ever adopted the stance "that an agency can cure an unlawful delegation of legislative power by adopting in its discretion a limiting construction of the statute."

== See also ==
- List of United States Supreme Court cases, volume 321
