= Office of Economic Stabilization =

Price and wage controls body in the WWII-era White House

Agency overview
- Formed: October 3, 1942

The Office of Economic Stabilization was established within the United States Office for Emergency Management on October 3, 1942, pursuant to the Stabilization Act of 1942, as a means to control inflation during World War II through regulations on price, wage, and salary increases.

== Directors of Economic Stabilization ==
Image	Name	Start	End	President
	James F. Byrnes	October 3, 1942	May 27, 1943	Franklin D. Roosevelt (1933–1945)
	Fred M. Vinson	May 28, 1943	July 23, 1945	Franklin D. Roosevelt (1933–1945)
	William Hammatt Davis	1945	1946	Franklin D. Roosevelt (1933–1945)
	William Hammatt Davis	1945	1946	Harry S. Truman (1945–1953)

== See also ==
- Emergency Price Control Act of 1942
- Office of Price Administration
