= Stabilization Act of 1942 =

US law implemented to control prices during World War II

- Other short titles: Emergency Price Control Amendment of 1942
- Long title: An Act to amend the Emergency Price Control Act of 1942, to aid in preventing inflation, and for other purposes.
- Acronyms (colloquial): PCSA
- Nicknames: Price Control Stabilization Act of 1942
- Enacted by: the 77th United States Congress
- Effective: October 2, 1942

Citations
- Public law: Pub. L. 77–729
- Statutes at Large: 56 Stat. 765

Codification
- Acts amended: Emergency Price Control Act of 1942
- Titles amended: 50 U.S.C.: War and National Defense
- U.S.C. sections created: 50a U.S.C. § 961

Legislative history
- Introduced in the House as H.R. 7565 by Henry B. Steagall (D-AL) on September 21, 1942; Committee consideration by House Banking and Currency, Senate Banking and Currency; Passed the House on September 23, 1942 (284-96); Passed the Senate on September 30, 1942 (82-0); Reported by the joint conference committee on October 2, 1942; agreed to by the House on October 2, 1942 (Agreed) and by the Senate on October 2, 1942 (Agreed); Signed into law by President Franklin D. Roosevelt on October 2, 1942

The Stabilization Act of 1942 (Pub. L. 77–729, 56 Stat. 765, enacted October 2, 1942), formally entitled "An Act to Amend the Emergency Price Control Act of 1942, to Aid in Preventing Inflation, and for Other Purposes," and sometimes referred to as the "Inflation Control Act", was an act of Congress that amended the Emergency Price Control Act of 1942.

== Contents ==
The Act authorized and directed the President to issue an order stabilizing prices, wages and salaries to the levels they had had as of September 15, 1942, and to issue additional regulations related to the Act. The Act excluded from stabilization "insurance and pension benefits in a reasonable amount to be determined by the President".

The Act also extended the expiration date of the Emergency Price Control Act by a year, to June 30, 1944.

As a penalty for violating the Act, the Act provided for a fine of $1000, imprisonment for up to a year, or both.

On October 3, 1942, the day after the statute's enactment, President Franklin Roosevelt issued Executive Order no. 9250, fixing wages and salaries in accordance with the Act, and establishing the Office of Economic Stabilization. On April 8, 1943, President Franklin Roosevelt issued Executive Order 9328 which was a hold the line on further increases in prices affecting the cost of living and increases in wages and salaries with the exception where there were substandard living conditions. On September 25, 1943, President Franklin Roosevelt issued Executive Order 9381 directing the National War Labor Board to stabilize salary and wages per annum paid by any United States employer.

One consequence of the wage stabilization under the Act was that employers, unable to provide higher salaries to attract or retain employees, began to offer insurance plans, including health care packages, as a fringe benefit, thereby beginning the practice of employer-sponsored health insurance.

== Economic Stabilization Extension ==
Stabilization Extension Act of 1944 extended the price controls and economic stabilization authorities established by the Emergency Price Control and Stabilization Acts for the duration to June 30, 1945. The S. 1764 legislation was passed by the 78th U.S. Congressional session and enacted into law by President Franklin D. Roosevelt on June 30, 1944.

== See also ==
- George W. Taylor
- Office of Price Administration
- Wage Stabilization Board
