= List of United States Supreme Court cases, volume 321 =

This is a list of all the United States Supreme Court cases from volume 321 of the United States Reports:

Case name	Citation	Date decided
Snowden v. Hughes	321 U.S. 1	1944
Thomson v. United States	321 U.S. 19	1944
Tennant v. Peoria & P.U.R.R. Co.	321 U.S. 29	1944
Demorest v. City Bank Farmers Tr. Co.	321 U.S. 36	1944
Trainmen v. Toledo P. & W.R.R. Co.	321 U.S. 50	1944
McLean Trucking Co. v. United States	321 U.S. 67	1944
Mahnich v. S.S.S. Co.	321 U.S. 96	1944
Ex parte Hawk	321 U.S. 114	1944
Nw. Elec. Co. v. FPC	321 U.S. 119	1944
B.F. Goodrich Co. v. United States	321 U.S. 126	1944
Carter v. Virginia	321 U.S. 131	1944
Davies Warehouse Co. v. Bowles	321 U.S. 144	1944
Prince v. Massachusetts	321 U.S. 158	1944
Brown v. Gerdes	321 U.S. 178	1944
E.-Cent. Motor Carriers Ass'n v. United States	321 U.S. 194	1944
Comm'r v. Lane-Wells Co.	321 U.S. 219	1944
R. Simpson & Co. v. IRS	321 U.S. 225	1944
Dobson v. IRS	321 U.S. 231	1944
Anderson Nat'l Bank v. Luckett	321 U.S. 233	1944
Flournoy v. Wiener	321 U.S. 253	1944
Goodyear Tire & Rubber Co. v. Ray-O-Vac Co.	321 U.S. 275	1944
Sec. Flour Mills Co. v. Comm'r	321 U.S. 281	1944
Stark v. Wickard	321 U.S. 288	1944
Hecht Co. v. Bowles	321 U.S. 321	1944
J.I. Case Co. v. NLRB	321 U.S. 332	1944
R.R. Tels. v. Ry. Express Agency, Inc.	321 U.S. 342	1944
Anderson v. Abbott	321 U.S. 349	1944
Johnson v. Yellow Cab Transit Co.	321 U.S. 383	1944
United States v. Wabash R.R. Co.	321 U.S. 403	1944
Yakus v. United States	321 U.S. 414	1944
Vinson v. Wash. Gas Light Co.	321 U.S. 489	1944
Bowles v. Willingham	321 U.S. 503	1944
Billings v. Truesdell	321 U.S. 542	1944
Equitable Life Assurance Soc'y v. Comm'r	321 U.S. 560	1944
Norton v. Warner Co.	321 U.S. 565	1944
Follett v. Town of McCormick	321 U.S. 573	1944
United States v. Seattle-First Nat'l Bank	321 U.S. 583	1944
Tenn. Coal Iron & R.R. Co. v. Muscoda	321 U.S. 590	1944
Sartor v. Ark. Nat. Gas Corp.	321 U.S. 620	1944
Bos. Tow Boat Co. v. United States	321 U.S. 632	1944
Cornell S.S. Co. v. United States	321 U.S. 634	1944
Smith v. Allwright	321 U.S. 649	1944
Walling v. James V. Reuter, Inc.	321 U.S. 671	1944
Medo Photo Supply Corp. v. NLRB	321 U.S. 678	1944
Franks Bros. Co. v. NLRB	321 U.S. 702	1944
United States v. Bausch & Lomb Optical Co.	321 U.S. 707	1944
United States v. Blair	321 U.S. 730	1944
