= Emergency Court of Appeals =

World War II era US federal court

The Emergency Court of Appeals was a temporary federal court established by the United States during World War II, whose purpose was to review wage- and price-control matters. The Court, established by the Emergency Price Control Act of 1942, had "exclusive jurisdiction to set aside such regulation, order, or price schedule, in whole or in part, to dismiss the complaint, or to remand the proceeding". This exclusive grant of jurisdiction was upheld by the Supreme Court of the United States in Lockerty v. Philips (1943). From March 2, 1942 to May 27, 1943, the chief judge of the Emergency Court of Appeals was Frederick M. Vinson, who was also serving as a judge of the District of Columbia Circuit, and who would eventually serve as Chief Justice of the United States.

The Court consisted of three or more judges designated by the Chief Justice from the judges of the United States district courts and Courts of Appeals. The Court was vested with jurisdiction and powers of a district court to hear appeals filed within thirty days against denials of protests by the Price Administrator and with exclusive jurisdiction to set aside regulations, orders, or price schedules, in whole or in part, or to remand the proceeding, but the court was tightly constrained in its treatment of regulations. Decisions of the Court could be appealed to the Supreme Court of the United States.

Some functions of this court were later revived in the Temporary Emergency Court of Appeals in the 1970s, the jurisdiction of which was ultimately transferred to the United States Court of Appeals for the Federal Circuit.

== List of judges ==
The following judges were members of the Emergency Court of Appeals:

Judge	Active service	Chief Judge
Calvert Magruder	1942–1962	
Albert Branson Maris	1942–1962	1943–1962
Fred M. Vinson	1942–1943	1942–1943
Bolitha James Laws	1943–1958	
Walter C. Lindley	1944–1958	
Thomas Francis McAllister	1945–1962	
