= JI Case Co v. National Labor Relations Board =

JI Case Co. v. NLRB
- Supreme Court of the United States

Argued January 3, 1944 Decided February 28, 1944
- Full case name: JI Case Company v. National Labor Relations Board
- Citations: 321 U.S. 332 (more) 64 S.Ct. 576; 88 L.Ed. 762

Holding
- Under the National Labor Relations Act, the employer and the union are always free to negotiate a collective bargaining agreement as a set of minimum requirements, which individual contracts between an employee and the employer may exceed.

Court membership
- Chief Justice Harlan F. Stone Associate Justices Owen Roberts · Hugo Black; Stanley F. Reed · Felix Frankfurter; William O. Douglas · Frank Murphy; Robert H. Jackson · Wiley B. Rutledge

Case opinions
- Majority: Jackson, joined by Stone, Black, Reed, Frankfurter, Douglas, Murphy, Rutledge
- Dissent: Roberts

Laws applied
- National Labor Relations Act of 1935, labor law

JI Case Co. v. National Labor Relations Board, 321 U.S. 332 (1944), is a United States Supreme Court case in which the court held that the employer and the union are always free to negotiate a collective bargaining agreement as a set of minimum requirements, which individual contracts between an employee and the employer may exceed. Workers at the company's factory had voted to unionize, but J.I. Case Company had refused to negotiate with the new union, and tried to enforce old contracts instead. The court upheld the NLRB's decision that they'd violated the National Labor Relations Act but said that the NLRB had to re-word the order it had issued.

== Background ==
J.I. Case Company operated a factory in Rock Island, Illinois, and in 1941 the Congress of Industrial Organizations (CIO) started working to organize the workers there, working to become their union. They received the proper certification from the NLRB for this, and the workers voted to join the union. However, the company refused to begin collective bargaining with the CIO. They argued that most of the workers had signed individual contracts, and these contracts were still binding.

After the union complained, the NLRB said that the company was guilty of unfair labor practices, violating the National Labor Relations Act of 1935. The Board ordered the company to start collective bargaining on terms for a new contract, to stop telling workers that their old contracts were still legally binding, and to stop having new employees sign the old contracts. A Court of Appeals granted an order of enforcement, and the company appealed to the U.S. Supreme Court.

== Opinion of the court ==
The court sided with the NLRB in an 8-1 vote. An existing contract would ordinarily continue to have legal force until broken—for example, by a worker quitting or being fired—but under the National Labor Relations Act, collective bargaining agreements had become something of a special case:

The negotiations between union and management result in what often has been called a trade agreement, rather than in a contract of employment. Without pushing the analogy too far, the agreement may be likened to the tariffs established by a carrier, to standard provisions prescribed by supervising authorities for insurance policies, or to utility schedules of rates and rules for service...The employer...is free to select those he will employ or discharge. But the terms of the employment already have been traded out. There is little left to individual agreement except the act of hiring.

— J.I. Case Co. v. NLRB, 321 U.S. 332 (Justice Robert H. Jackson, writing for the court)

Accordingly, the fact that there was an older contract between a company and its workers did not prevent the application of the National Labor Relations Act, which required companies to enter collective bargaining with unions. Justice Jackson distinguished this situation from one where negotiations were ongoing, but no agreement had been reached yet; then individual contracts could have effect.

Having decided this, the Court still felt that the wording the NLRB had originally used for its order had been too strong. The wording might have allowed workers to sue the company and yet prohibited the company from defending itself in court; so the Supreme Court issued new wording for the order, which simply told J.I. Case Co. to stop enforcing the old contracts or interfering with collective bargaining, and to tell all workers that they wouldn't be bound by the old contract.

Justice Owen Roberts dissented, but did not write an opinion.

== Historical context ==
This dispute was happening not only in the middle of World War II, but also in a period of other labor troubles for JI Case Company; a strike would begin in December 1945 at their factory in Racine, Wisconsin that would last for a historically-long 440 days.

For the Supreme Court, this decision came seven years after West Coast Hotel Co. v. Parrish, a case that is generally seen as the end of the Lochner era, and the beginning of an era when the Court would uphold government regulations of business and industry more often.

== See also ==
- United States labor law
