= Snowden v. Hughes =

- Supreme Court of the United States

Argued December 13, 1943 Decided January 17, 1944
- Full case name: Joseph Snowden v. Edward J. Hughes and Louie E. Louis
- Citations: 321 U.S. 1 (more) 64 S. Ct. 397; 88 L. Ed. 497

Case history
- Prior: 132 F.2d 476 (7th Cir.), cert. granted, 319 U.S. 738.

Holding
- The Fourteenth Amendment does not protect rights pertinent solely to state citizenship, and the equal protection clause does not protect citizens from unfair applications of fair state laws where purposeful discrimination is absent.

Court membership
- Chief Justice Harlan F. Stone Associate Justices Owen Roberts · Hugo Black; Stanley F. Reed · Felix Frankfurter; William O. Douglas · Frank Murphy; Robert H. Jackson · Wiley B. Rutledge

Case opinions
- Majority: Stone, joined by Roberts, Black, Reed, Frankfurther, Jackson
- Concurrence: Frankfurter
- Concurrence: Rutledge (in judgment)
- Dissent: Douglas, joined by Murphy

Laws applied
- United States Constitution, Amendment XIV

Snowden v. Hughes, 321 U.S. 1 (1944), was a United States Supreme Court case in which the Court held that the Fourteenth Amendment to the United States Constitution does not protect rights pertinent solely to state citizenship, and that the equal protection clause does not protect citizens from unfair applications of fair state laws where purposeful discrimination is absent.
