= Emergency Price Control Act of 1942 =

- Long title: An Act to further the national defense and security by checking speculative and excessive price rises, price dislocations, and inflationary tendencies, and for other purposes.
- Acronyms (colloquial): EPCA
- Enacted by: the 77th United States Congress
- Effective: January 30, 1942

Citations
- Public law: Pub. L. 77–421
- Statutes at Large: 56 Stat. 23

Codification
- Titles amended: 50 U.S.C.: War and National Defense
- U.S.C. sections created: 50a U.S.C. § 901

Legislative history
- Introduced in the House as H.R. 5990 by Henry B. Steagall (D-AL) on November 7, 1941; Committee consideration by House Banking and Currency and Senate Banking, Housing, and Urban Affairs; Passed the House on November 28, 1941 (224-161); Passed the Senate on January 10, 1942 (84-1); Reported by the joint conference committee on January 10, 1942; agreed to by the House on January 26, 1942 (289-114) and by the Senate on January 27, 1942 (65-14); Signed into law by President Franklin D. Roosevelt on January 30, 1942

Major amendments
- Stabilization Act of 1942

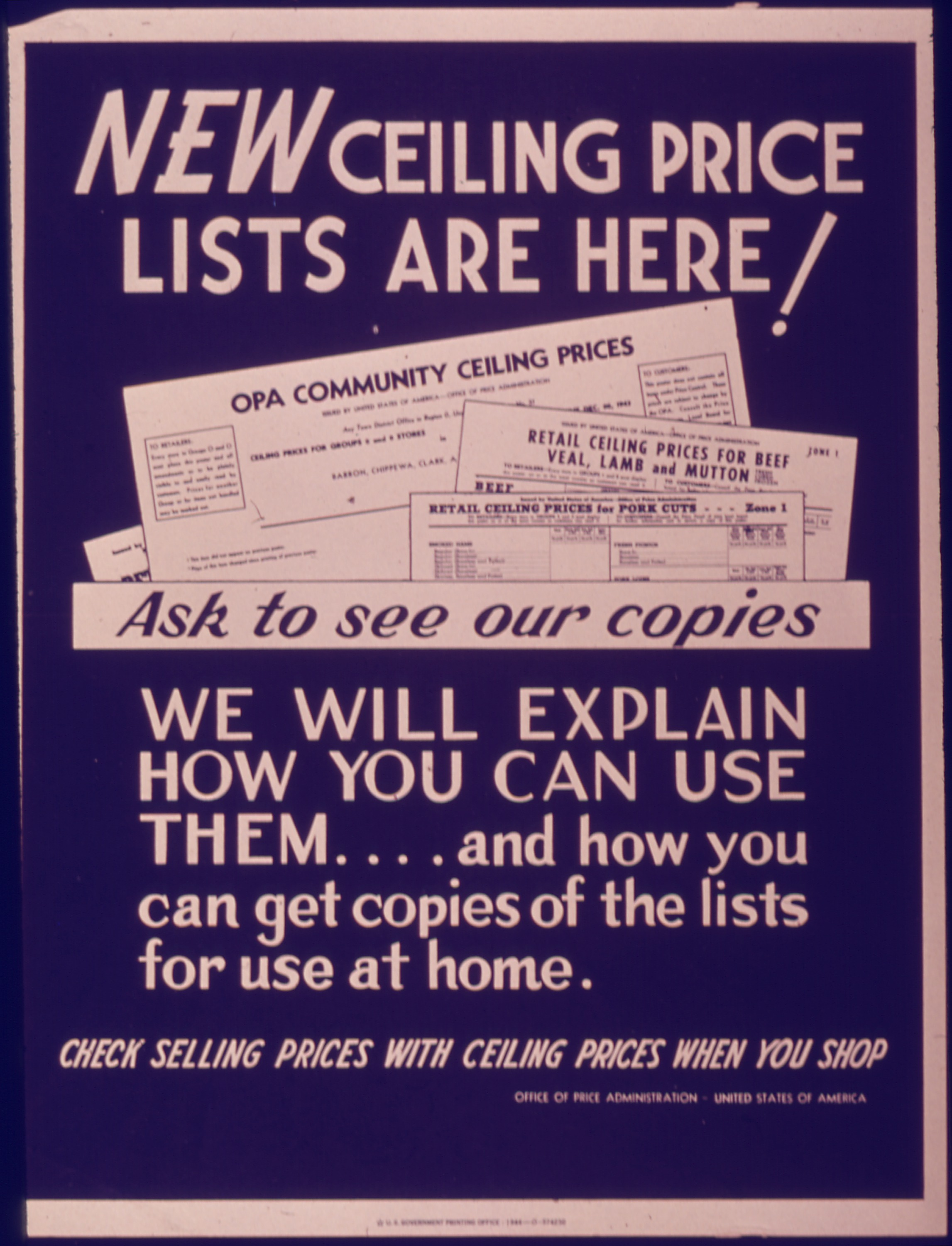

The Emergency Price Control Act of 1942 is a United States statute imposing an economic intervention as restrictive measures to control inflationary spiraling and pricing elasticity of goods and services while providing economic efficiency to support the United States national defense and security. The Act of Congress established the Office of Price Administration (OPA) as a federal independent agency being officially created by Franklin D. Roosevelt on April 11, 1941.

The H.R. 5990 legislation was passed by the 77th U.S. Congressional session and enacted into law by Franklin D. Roosevelt on January 30, 1942.

== Provisions of the Act ==
The Emergency Price Control Act was penned as three titles specifying rulings for price controls regarding agricultural commodities, goods and services, and real property. The Act provided authority for enforcement, investigative reporting, and reviews of price stabilization schedules by the Office of Price Administration. The law specified a time limit whereas orders, price schedules, regulations, and requirements by the Act were to terminate by June 30, 1947.

Title I: General Provisions and Authority

Purposes, Time Limits, Applicability
Prices, Rents, And Market And Renting Practices
Agricultural Commodities
Prohibitions
Voluntary Agreements

Title II: Administration and Enforcement

Administration
Investigations, Records, Reports
Procedure
Review
Enforcement
Saving Provisions

Title III: Miscellaneous

Quarterly Report
Definitions
Separability
Appropriations Authorized
Application Of Existing Law

== Impact ==
The Emergency Price Control Act engendered significant controversy regarding delegation of Congressional power, executive wartime authority, and Congressional control of federal jurisdiction. Much of this stemmed from the Act's creation of the Emergency Court of Appeals, an Article III court which had all "the powers of a district court with respect to the jurisdiction conferred on it," except it lacked the ability to issue temporary restraining orders or interlocutory decrees that would stay the effectiveness of any order, regulation, or price schedule issued by the Price Administrator of the Act. The Emergency Court had exclusive jurisdiction to hear complaints relating to actions of the Administrator except those relating to enjoining violations of the act/securing orders of compliance, treble damage actions, and criminal prosecutions for willful violations. For these, the Emergency Court shared jurisdiction with state courts. If anyone disagreed with an action taken by the Administrator (such as a price set), she would file a protest with the Administrator and if that was denied, she had thirty days to file a complaint with the Emergency Court. She could not file in any other district court, and the Emergency Court decisions were appealleable directly to the Supreme Court.

Two important cases--Lockerty v. Phillips, 319 U.S. 182 (1943), and Yakus v. United States, 321 U.S. 414 (1944)--continue to inform understandings of the relationship between Congress and the federal judiciary system.

=== Impact on the Understanding of Federal Courts ===
Federal Courts is the study of the relationship between state courts, federal courts, and the other branches of government. The Emergency Price Control Act and the associated Emergency Court of Appeals raised several questions about the relationship between Congress and the Federal Judiciary: (1) Can Congress "carve up" federal jurisdiction in this way? (2) If yes, is the creation of the Emergency Court--with all its limits--constitutional? To both questions, the Supreme Court answered yes, though its understanding of the relationship between the legislative and judicial branches may have been informed by the exigencies of war.

==== Can Congress "Carve Up" Federal Jurisdiction? ====
In Lockerty v. Phillips, 319 U.S. 182 (1943), several wholesale meat sellers sued to prevent the US Attorney from prosecuting them if they violated the price regulations. Among many arguments, one was that Congress lacked the authority to "carve up" jurisdiction in this form. Pursuant to the Act, the district court dismissed the action for lack of jurisdiction. The Supreme Court affirmed the dismissal, writing that "[t]he Congressional power to ordain and establish inferior courts includes the power of investing them with jurisdiction either limited, concurrent, or exclusive, and of withholding jurisdiction from them in exact degrees and character which to Congress may seem proper for the public good." That is, what Congress can give--federal courts--Congress can take away, and therefore, limit as well, even if it was by issue.

Plaintiffs also argued that the Emergency Court was inadequate to protect their constitutional rights because the Emergency Court could not issue interlocutory relief. However, the Court declined to discuss whether the Emergency Court served as an adequate constitutional rights protector, noting that the Act had a severability clause that, in the event of the interlocutory relief section being found unconstitutional, other provisions would take effect, thus saving the Act.

==== Is the Emergency Court of Appeals, With its Restrictions, Constitutional? ====
To understand this question, it is necessary to understand a bit about Article III. Article III does not require Congress to create lower federal courts, but when Congress does--as they did in the Judiciary Act of 1789, establishing the federal court system we know today--they are subject to limitations emanating from Article III and other constitutional provisions. For example, Congress cannot prohibit all African Americans from bringing a lawsuit, as this would independently violate Equal Protection under the 14th Amendment. In addition, Congress potential could not, for example, allow discrimination cases to only be filed in-person in the District Court of Puerto Rico, as this might substantially burden the ability of citizens to assert their constitutional rights.

Plaintiffs in Lockerty also argued that the Emergency Court was inadequate to protect their constitutional rights because the Emergency Court could not issue interlocutory relief. However, the Court declined to discuss whether the Emergency Court served as an adequate constitutional rights protector, noting that the Act had a severability clause that, in the event of the interlocutory relief section being found unconstitutional, other provisions would take effect, thus saving the Act.

The Court did discuss the constitutionality of the Emergency Court's limits in Yakus v. United States, 321 U.S. 414 (1944). While in Lockerty the Emergency Price Control Act was attacked offensively, in Yakus, the plaintiff--also a meat producer--had already been found to violate the Act. He was prosecuted under the Act with the potential for a criminal action. Yakus sought to raise the same issues as the plaintiffs in Lockerty (non-delegation--discussed below--due process (the inadequacy of the Emergency Court), and that the price was set too low), but does so by way of defenses for his action.

The Yakus Court treated as the central issue to the case whether the Emergency Court review procedure "affords to those affected a reasonable opportunity to be heard and present evidence." Writing for the Court, Chief Justice Stone found that the Act did, and that there was "no denial of due process" in the statutory provisions that denied the ability of the Emergency Court to grant, among other things, temporary stays or injunctions. This was especially so because the alternatives (wartime inflation or requiring individuals to comply with a price regulation while its validity was still being determined), "Congress could constitutionally make the choice in favor of the protection of the public interest from the dangers of inflation."

=== Impact on Administrative Law ===
Yakus also questioned the constitutionality of the Emergency Price Control Act with respect to the nondelegation doctrine, which governs when Congress can assign work to non-legislative bodies, such as the executive or judicial branches, and which work and to whom such work can be assigned. The resulting holding--which many believed to be in error--would alter American administrative jurisprudence for almost fifty years.

The holding in Yakus was a major development of American nondelegation law. Chief Justice Stone argued that an administrative agency could self-correct a problem of delegation if it limited its own power:

The standards prescribed by the present Act, with the aid of the "statement of the considerations" required to be made by the Administrator, are sufficiently definite and precise to enable Congress, the courts and the public to ascertain whether the administrator, in fixing the designated prices, has conformed to those standards . . . Hence we are unable to find in them an unauthorized delegation of legislative power. 321 U.S. at 426.

Thus, Yakus held that an administrative agency could "save" an otherwise unconstitutional delegation of power through a narrowing construction constraining that agency's own discretion. This would become a key principle in American constitutional law and would be followed by lower courts in striking down challenges to laws based on the nondelegation doctrine for the next fifty years. The Yakus principle was logically flawed however: how could an administrative agency itself cure a problem of delegation? The problem of delegation is one of excessive legislative power transferred to the executive branch--the delegation problem happens at the time of the passage of the statute. The act of an executive agency limiting that power is too late and does not correct the problem.

The Supreme Court came to this conclusion in Whitman v. American Trucking Associations, Inc.. In so doing, Justice Scalia denied that the Supreme Court had ever adopted such a stance on constitutional law: "We have never suggested that an agency can cure an unlawful delegation of legislative power by adopting in its discretion a limiting construction of the statute."

== See also ==
- Cost of living
- Great Depression
- Office of Economic Stabilization
- Price ceiling
- Rationing in the United States
- Standard of living in the United States
- Nondelegation Doctrine
