= Multiple Dwelling Law (New York) =

1929 state law

On April 18, 1929, the Multiple Dwelling Law was passed by the NY State Legislature. It originally faced challenges in courts, only to eventually be upheld as constitutional in August of that year. The law, set certain extra standards for building within cities with populations greater than 325,000, applying only to New York City. It was considered an update to the 1901 Tenement House Act. The stated goal of the bill was primarily to address slum conditions in the city.

"It is hereby declared that intensive occupation of multiple dwelling sites, overcrowding of multiple dwelling rooms, inadequate provision for light and air, and insufficient protection against the defective provision for escape from fire, and improper sanitation of multiple dwellings in certain areas of the state are a menace to the health, safety, morals, welfare, and reasonable comfort of the citizens of the state; and that the establishment and maintenance of proper housing standards requiring sufficient light, air, sanitation and protection from fire hazards are essential to the public welfare. Therefore the provisions hereinafter prescribed are enacted and their necessity in the public interest is hereby declared as a matter of legislative determination"

— Multiple Dwellings Law
