= Office of Price Administration =

Former US federal government agency

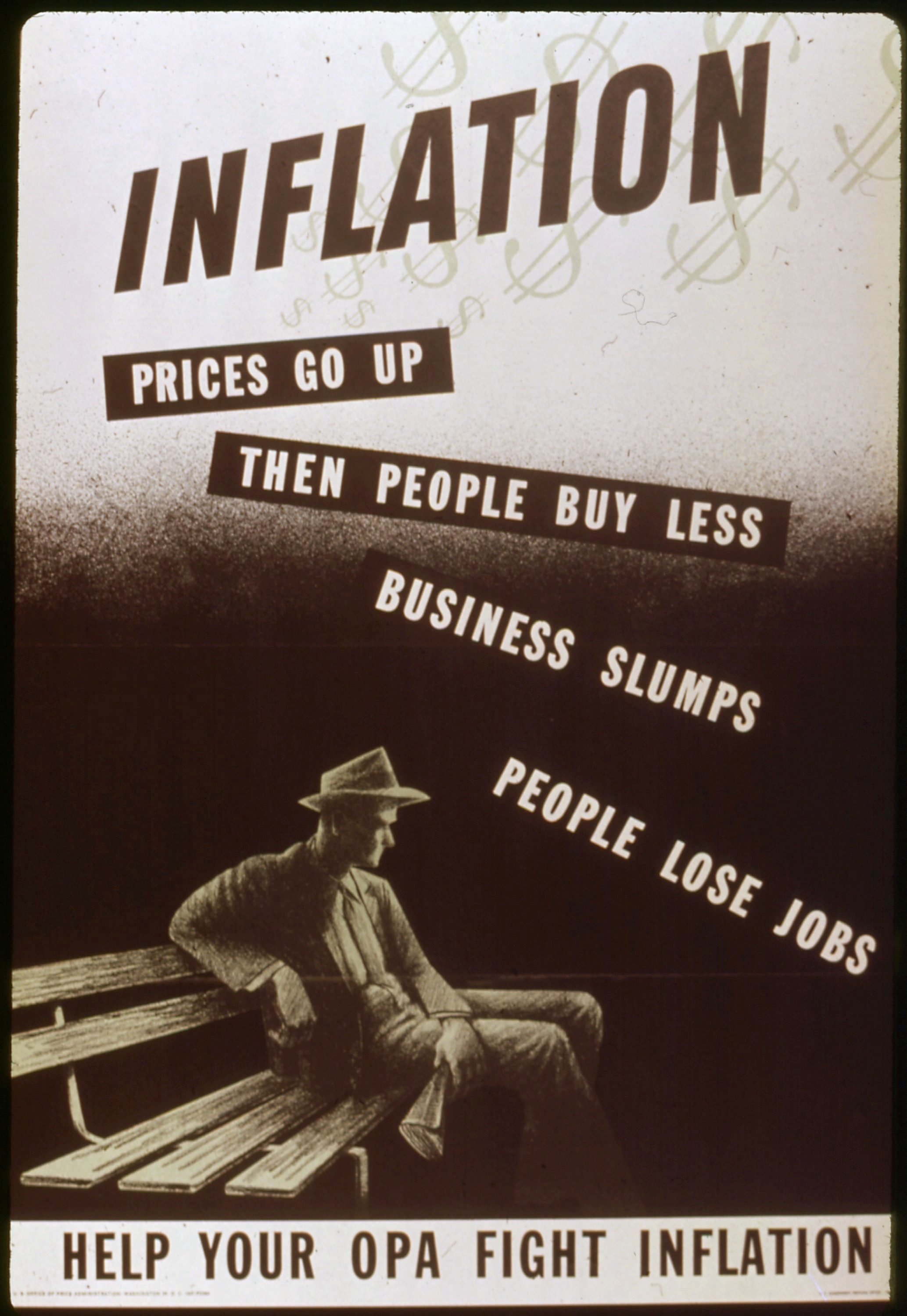
- An OPA poster

Agency overview
- Formed: August 28, 1941
- Preceding agency: Council of National Defense (World War I)
- Dissolved: May 29, 1947
- Superseding agencies: 1942 siblings: Office of Economic Stabilization, Office of Production Management; liquidated in 1947 to Agriculture, Justice, Commerce, RFC and others; Similar functions later performed by Office of Price Stabilization (Korean War-era price board); Council of Economic Advisors (Kennedy-era price board); Pay Board and Price Commission (Nixon-era price board)
- Jurisdiction: United States Government
- Headquarters: Washington, D.C.
- Agency executives: Leon Henderson, 1941–1942; Prentiss Marsh Brown, 1943; Chester Bliss Bowles, 1943–1946; Paul A. Porter, 1946
- Parent agency: Office for Emergency Management

The Office of Price Administration (OPA) was established within the Office for Emergency Management of the United States government by Executive Order 8875 on August 28, 1941. The functions of the OPA were originally to control money (price controls) and rents after the outbreak of World War II.

== History ==
=== Founding ===
President Franklin D. Roosevelt inaugurated the Council of National Defense Advisory Commission on May 29, 1940, to include Price Stabilization and Consumer Protection Divisions. Both divisions merged to become the Office of Price Administration and Civilian Supply (OPACS) within the Office for Emergency Management by Executive Order 8734, on April 11, 1941. Civil supply functions were transferred to the Office of Production Management.

It became an independent agency under the Emergency Price Control Act, January 30, 1942. The OPA had the power to place ceilings on all prices except agricultural commodities, and to ration scarce supplies of other items, including tires, automobiles, shoes, nylon, sugar, gasoline, fuel oil, coffee, meats and processed foods. At the peak, almost 90% of retail food prices were frozen. It could also authorize subsidies for production of some of those commodities.

=== Dissolution ===
As early as 1944, in its annual debate about price control extension, Congress discussed limiting the power of the OPA as World War II drew to a close and the necessity of price controls was called into question. While some argued for the continuation of price controls to hold post war inflation in check, there was widespread support among conservatives and businessmen for the rapid deregulation of the economy as it reconverted to a civilian footing. Groups such as the National Association of Manufacturers and the National Retail Dry Good Association sought to guarantee companies a minimum amount of profits, thereby effectively limiting the price control measures. However, the OPA still enjoyed widespread popular support and the agency was renewed in 1944 and again in 1945. While these renewals were considerable successes for many consumer advocacy groups, they also marked the height of the OPA, from which the agency's power and popularity would decline in the next two years.

By June 1946, significant opposition by NAM and NRDA had been mounted to sway Congress, which, only two days before the existing legislation was set to expire, passed a bill that would have left the OPA a much-weakened version of its past self. President Harry S. Truman vetoed this bill in hopes of forcing Congress to create a stronger one, but as the month of June came to an end, the OPA shut down, and its price and rent controls went with it. The result was a sharp jump in prices, with food increasing by 14 percent and the cost of overall living rising by 6 percent, an equivalent to more than 100 percent per year. Consumers all over the nation turned out in varying numbers to protest these increases, with labor unions forming a major part of the participants.

By the end of July, Congress had reversed course and passed legislation reinstating the OPA and price controls, though this bill was no stronger than what President Truman had vetoed earlier. This much-weakened version of the OPA did not last long, as meat packers launched their own form of protest against the agency, slowing slaughtering rates and withholding meat from market. The resulting widespread shortages did much to damage the public faith in the OPA, which was now seen as ineffective, and the Democrat-led Congress. When faced with the choices of higher prices or no meat, the consumers chose the latter. Although President Truman ended price controls on meat, on October 14, just two weeks before the election, in a rejection of price controls and as a sign of the changing attitude of the American public towards a control-free re-conversion, many Democratic incumbents were defeated, and Republicans gained control of Congress. Following this defeat, Truman lifted almost all price and wage controls and, while the OPA was authorized to exist through June 30, 1947, its range of tasks and ability to effectively regulate prices was curtailed severely, being reduced to rent control and some price control over a very limited number of goods. Most functions of the OPA were transferred to the newly established Office of Temporary Controls (OTC) by Executive Order 9809, December 12, 1946. The Financial Reporting Division was transferred to the Federal Trade Commission. By the end of December 1946, many of OPA's local offices and price boards were closed, and the OPA did not survive until its authorized June 30 extension.

The OPA was abolished effective May 29, 1947 by the General Liquidation Order, issued March 14, 1947, by the OPA Administrator. Some of its functions were taken up by successor agencies:

- Sugar and sugar products distribution by the Sugar Rationing Administration in the Department of Agriculture pursuant to the Sugar Control Extension Act (61 Stat. 36), March 31, 1947
- Price controls over rice by the Department of Agriculture by Executive Order 9841, on April 23, 1947, effective May 4, 1947
- Food subsidies by the Reconstruction Finance Corporation, effective May 4, 1947
- Rent control by the Office of the Housing Expediter, effective May 4, 1947
- Price violation litigation by the Department of Justice, effective June 1, 1947
- All other OPA functions by the Division of Liquidation, Department of Commerce, effective June 1, 1947.

Famous employees include economist John Kenneth Galbraith, legal scholar William Prosser, President Richard Nixon, and law professor John Honnold.

The OPA is featured, in fictionalized form as the Bureau of Price Regulation, in Rex Stout's Nero Wolfe mystery novel The Silent Speaker.

The OPA unsuccessfully tried to revoke the car dealer license of unorthodox businessman Madman Muntz for violating used car regulations, subject to price control. Muntz was acquitted in Los Angeles Superior Court on 1 August 1945.

During the Korean War, similar functions were performed by the Office of Price Stabilization (OPS).

== Women and the OPA ==
The success of the OPA’s price controls and rationing policies depended on the support of women who acted as the main shoppers of their households, especially during wartime. Local community organizations, governments, and OPA boards held educational seminars aimed at women, targeted women to join local price and rationing boards, and recruited women for volunteer programs. Many women led local volunteer War Price and Rationing Boards that ensured adherence to stabilization policies through check-ins with stores to report businesses breaking the rules. Women involved with the OPA largely fell into two broad categories: those who were part of already organized groups, such as labor unions, women’s groups, and consumer groups, among others, often with agendas that aligned with OPA’s goals of price stabilization; and women not already part of organized groups, who came from diverse backgrounds. They used the OPA as a legally established and legitimate framework for organizing themselves.

The OPA’s enlistment of women to ensure that local businesses were complying with federal policies extended the public sphere into the private sphere and the effective growth of “state supervision.” This resulted in a pseudo-militant attitude toward regulation and made it more difficult for politicians to curb the power of the OPA.

The OPA worked with consumer activists in a “mutually empowering” and mutually reliant fashion to ensure the effectiveness of its policies and activists’ interests. Thus, a large swathe of consumer activists helped to ensure that businesses were compliant with its policies. Widespread support of the OPA came from the belief that the agency could help establish postwar prosperity.

== African Americans and the OPA ==
New York City Councilman Benjamin J. Davis Jr. (seated third from left, with papers) at an OPA hearing on black market activities in Harlem, October 1943

Black consumer activists also were among those who supported the OPA, which gave them support from the federal government in fighting market discrimination.

The OPA had a base of consumer support that included different socioeconomic classes and racial groups who supported the agency because of their belief it would bring about a postwar vision of “broad popular participation and consumer rights." The OPA worked to defend consumers from exploitation by businesses while also acting as a space for citizens to become involved in politics.

== Administrators of the office ==
Image	Name	Start	End	President
	Leon Henderson	1941	1942	Franklin D. Roosevelt (1933–1945)
	Prentiss M. Brown	1943	1943	Franklin D. Roosevelt (1933–1945)
	Chester B. Bowles	1943	1946	Franklin D. Roosevelt (1933–1945)
	Chester B. Bowles	1943	1946	Harry S. Truman (1945–1953)
	Paul A. Porter	February 21, 1946	December 4, 1946	Harry S. Truman (1945–1953)

== OPA points ==
OPA points are small vulcanized fibre red and blue ration tokens issued during World War II to make change for ration coupons. Approximately 1.1 billion red and 0.9 billion blue were produced, and even though many were collected and destroyed after the war, they are still quite common today. The red OPA points are a bit more common than the blue. Each token has two letters on it, and some people collect them by letter combination.

== Gallery ==
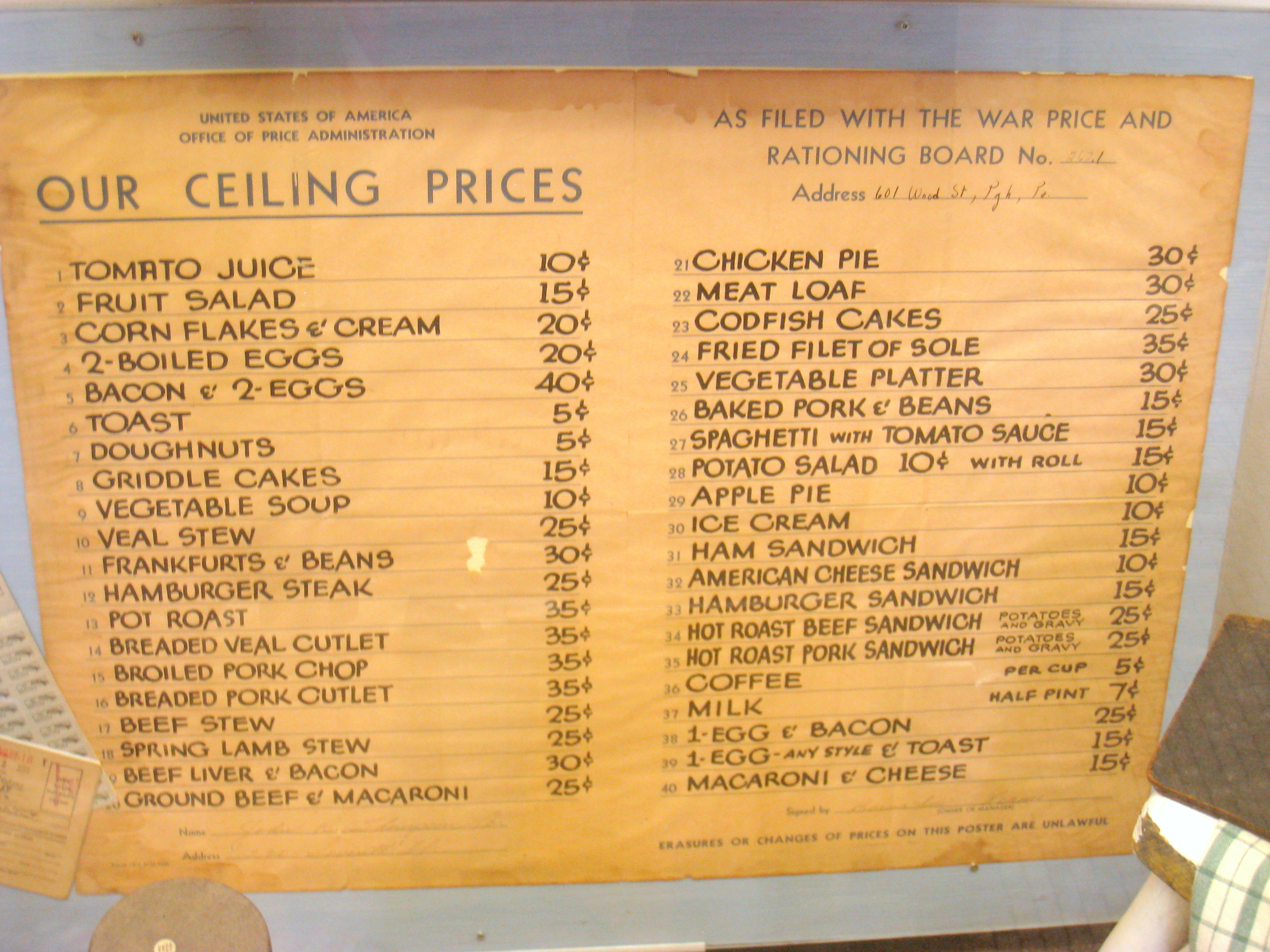
An OPA menu with ceiling prices.

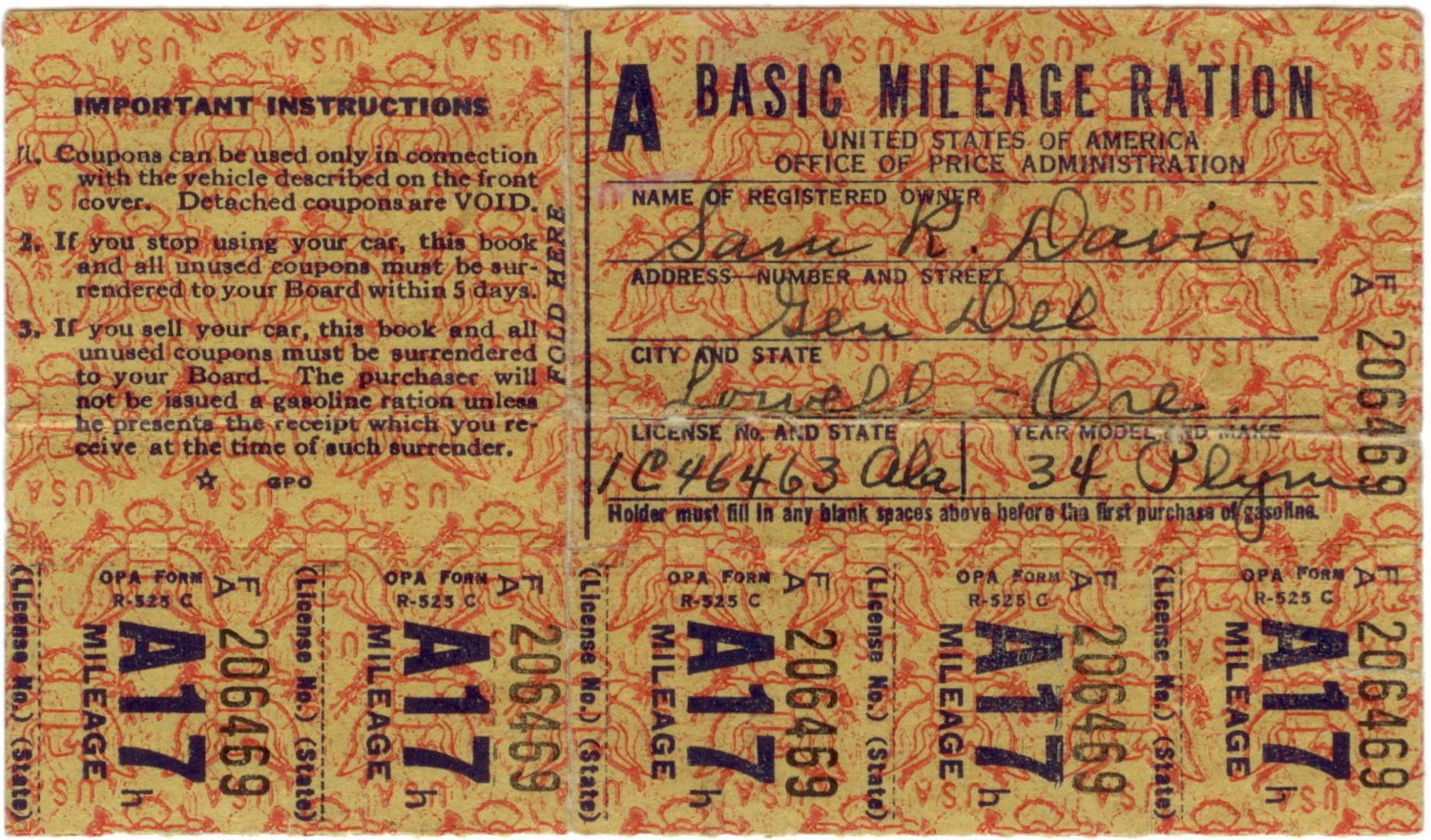
A mileage ration book issued by the OPA.

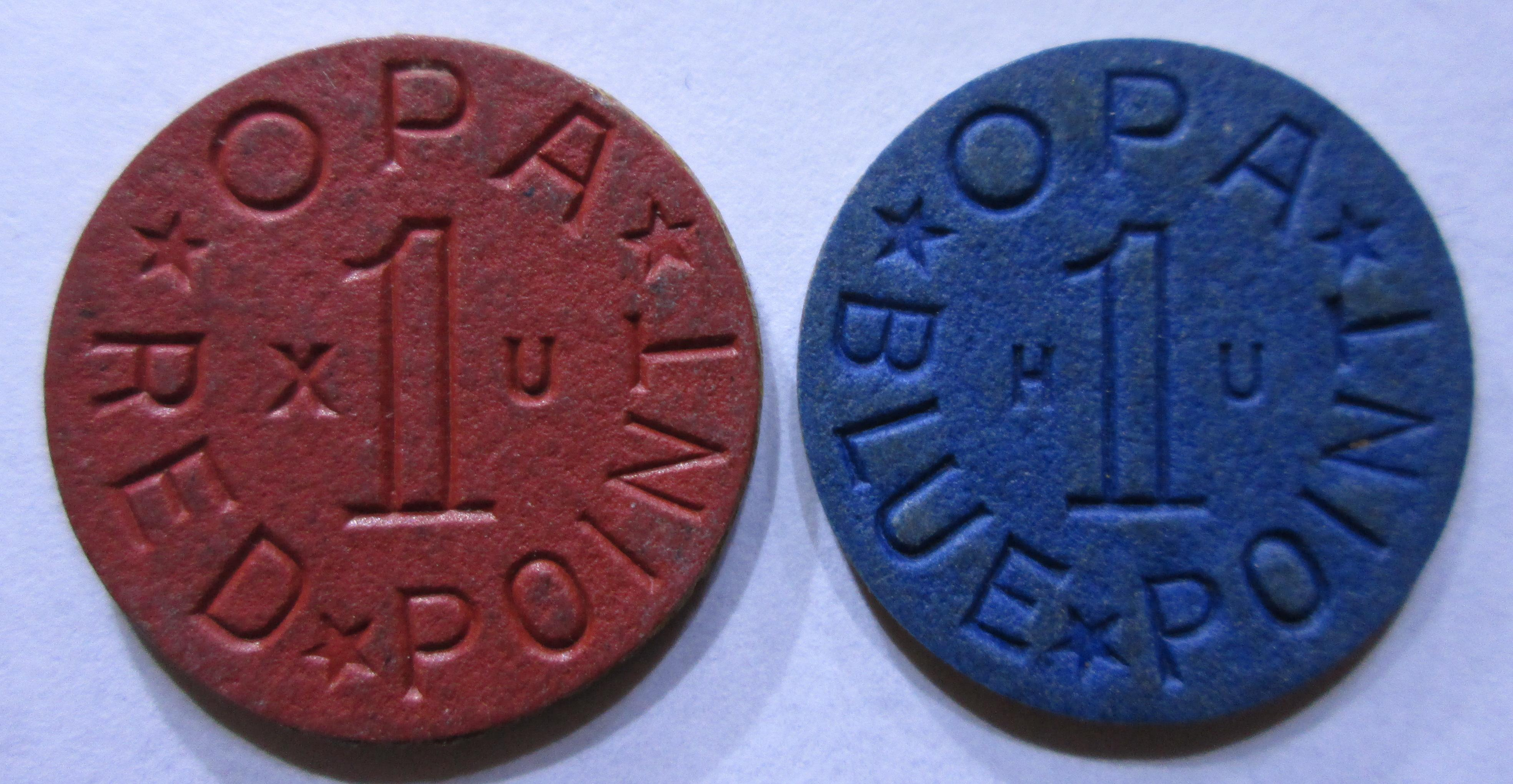
Red and blue OPA points.

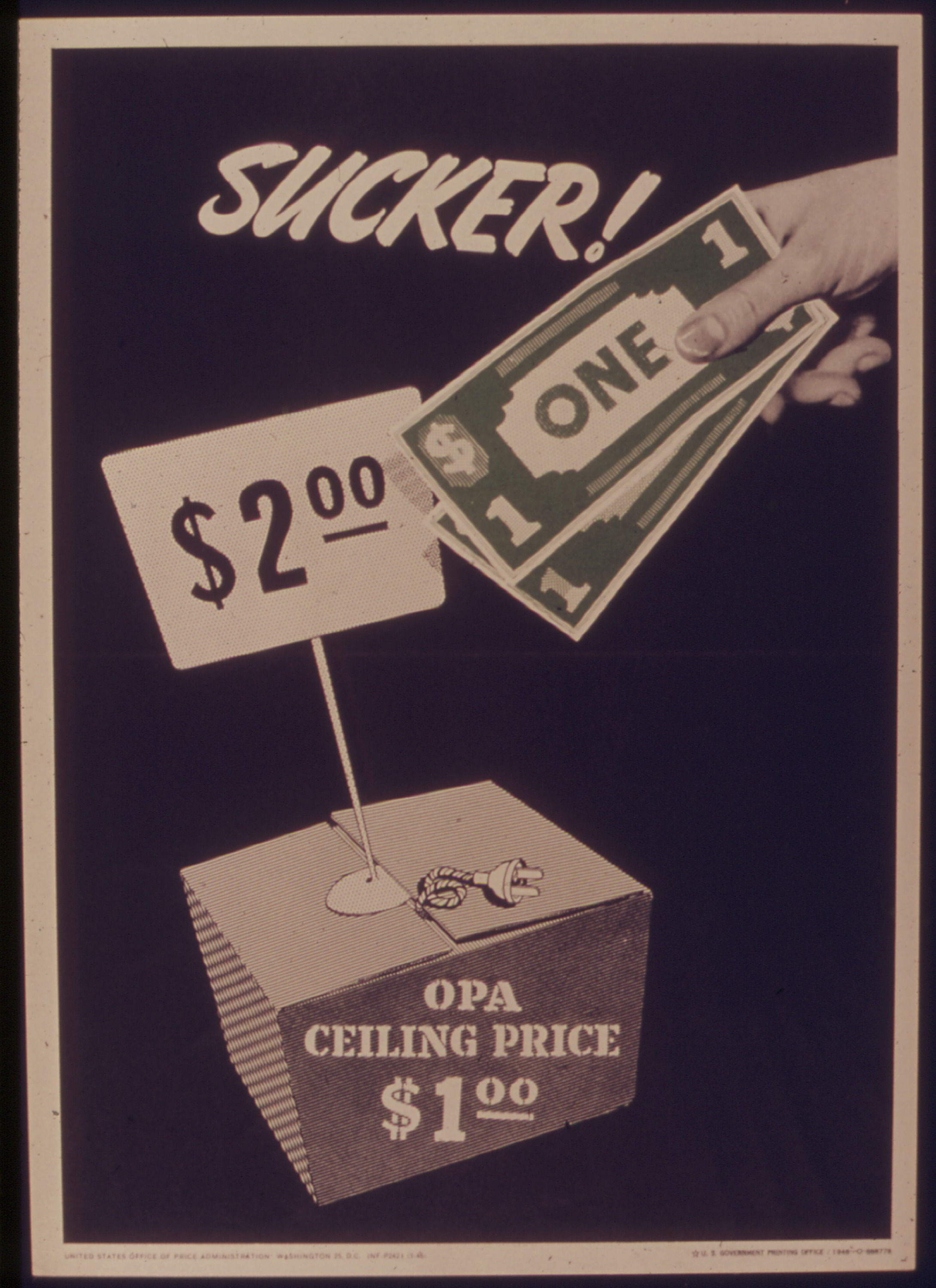

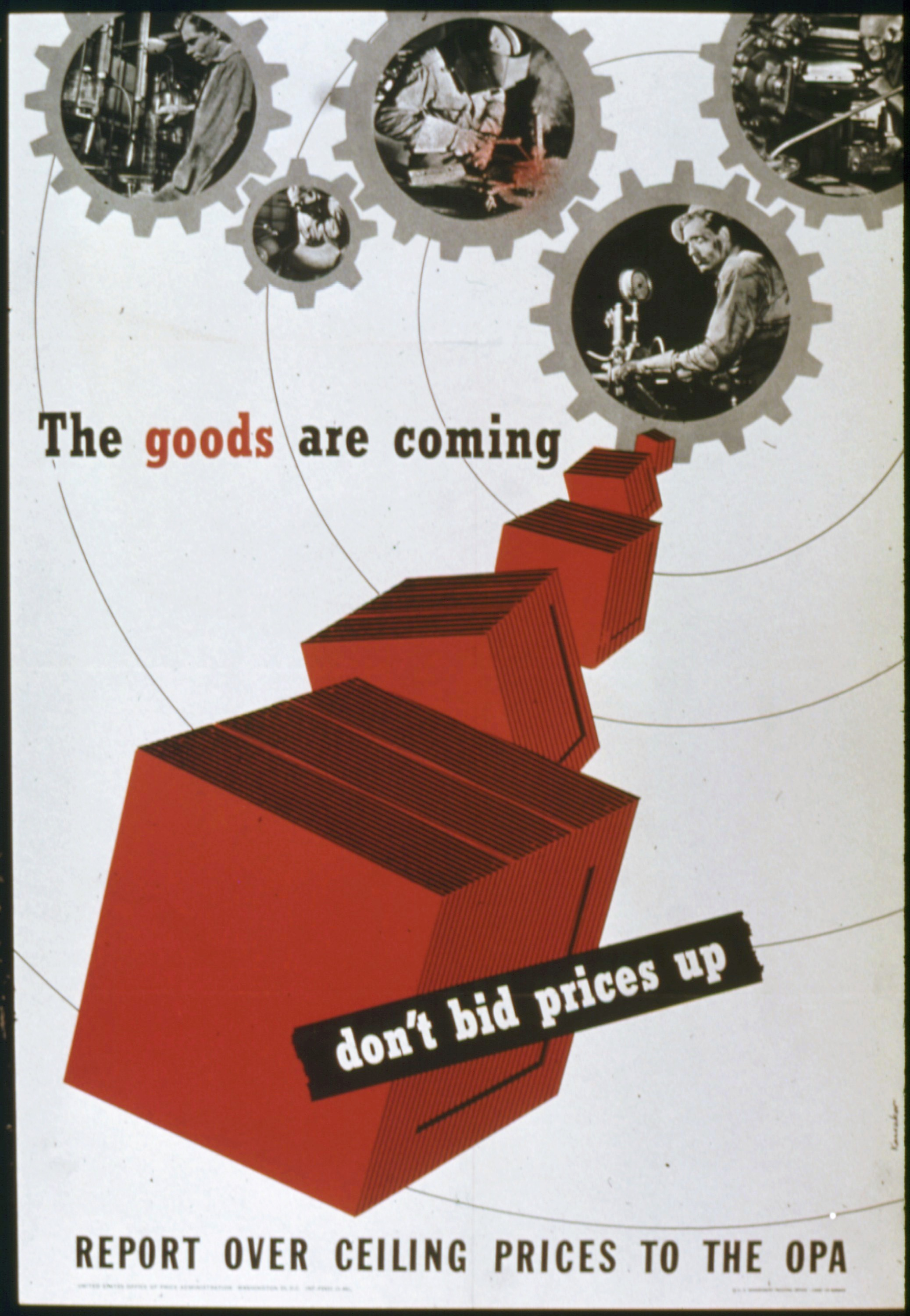

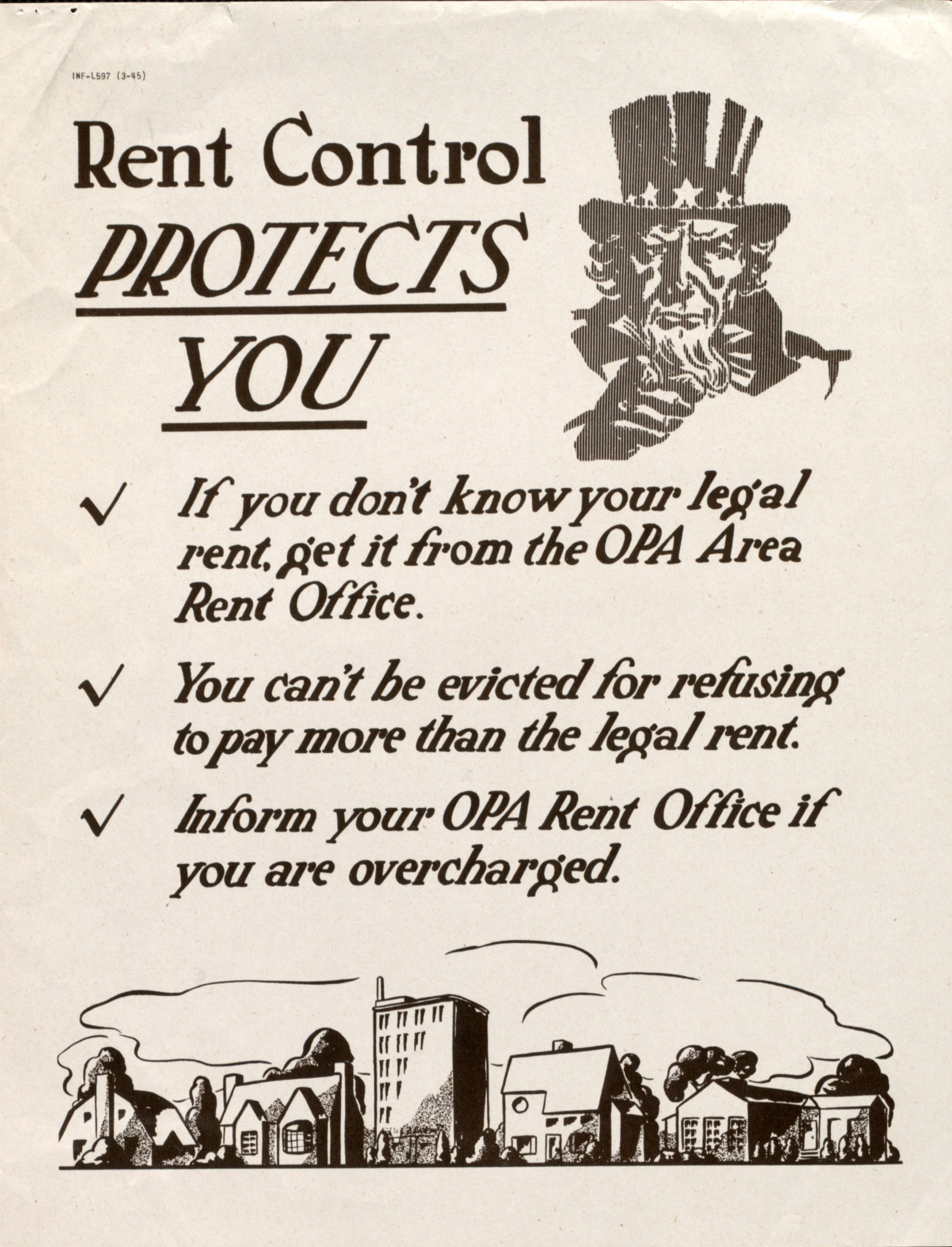

== See also ==
- Office of Economic Stabilization
- Stabilization Act of 1942
- United States home front during World War II
