= Crystal City High School =

Coordinates: 28.6903°N 99.8215°W

Location
- 1116 North 7th Avenue; Crystal City, (Zavala County), Texas 78839; United States

Information
- Type: Public high school
- Principal: Robert Alvarado
- Staff: 32.88 (FTE)
- Enrollment: 521 (2023-2024)
- Student to teacher ratio: 15.85
- Colors: Green and gold
- Nickname: Javelinas

Crystal City High School is a high school that serves the city of Crystal City, Texas, as well as the unincorporated communities of Chula Vista-River Spur, Amaya, Loma Grande, Cometa, and southern Zavala County. It is part of the Crystal City Independent School District. Its team name is the Javelinas (alternatively the Javelins, or Javalines in Spanish), with the boys nicknamed as "Hawgs" and the girls nicknamed as "Lady Javs".

As of the 2020-2021 school year, Crystal City High School has 538 students.
