= Bayview, California =

Bayview, California may refer to:

- Bayview, Contra Costa County, California, a census designated place
- Bayview, Humboldt County, California, a census designated place
- Bayview, California, a fictional city near San Diego that acts as the setting of the young adult-suspense novel One of Us Is Lying by Karen M. McManus.

== See also ==
- Bayview–Hunters Point, San Francisco, California, a neighborhood
- Bayview (disambiguation)
