= CCISD =

CCISD may refer to:

- Copperas Cove Independent School District
- Corpus Christi Independent School District
- Clear Creek Independent School District
- Corrigan-Camden Independent School District
- Crystal City Independent School District
