= Bayview Cemetery =

Bayview Cemetery may refer to:

- an historic cemetery near Mahone Bay, Nova Scotia, Canada
- an historic cemetery in Port Rowan, Ontario, Canada
- a cemetery in Ketchikan, Alaska, U.S.
- Bayview – New York Bay Cemetery, Jersey City, New Jersey, U.S.

== See also ==
- Old Bayview Cemetery, Corpus Christi, Texas
- Bayview (disambiguation)
