= Las Colonias =

Las Colonias may refer to:

- Las Colonias, Texas, a former census-designated place in Zavala County, Texas
- Las Colonias Department, in Santa Fe Province, Argentina
