= Bay View =

Bay View may refer to:

== Places ==
New Zealand:

- Bay View, New Zealand (in Hawke's Bay)

South Africa:

- Bay View, Western Cape

United Kingdom:

- Bay View, Kent

United States:

- Bay View, California, former name of Bayview, Humboldt County, California
- Bay View, Michigan
- Bay View, Ohio
- Bay View, Washington
- Bay View, Wisconsin (disambiguation), multiple places
- Bay View, a neighborhood of Gloucester, Massachusetts
- Bay View station, Los Angeles, California

== Other uses ==
- San Francisco Bay View, newspaper, after the San Francisco neighborhood

== See also ==
- Bayview (disambiguation)
- Bayview Hill (disambiguation)
