= Bayview =

Bayview may refer to:

== Places ==
=== Australia ===
- Bayview, New South Wales
- Bayview, Northern Territory

=== Canada ===
- Bayview, Calgary, a neighborhood in Alberta
- Bayview, Newfoundland and Labrador
- Bayview Avenue, a road in Toronto, Ontario
  - Bayview station (Toronto), a TTC subway station located on the above road
- Bayview station (OC Transpo), a station on Ottawa's O-Train Trillium Line

=== New Zealand ===
- Bayview, New Zealand, a suburb of North Shore City in the Auckland Region

=== United States ===
- Bayview, Alabama
- Bayview, Humboldt County, California, a census designated place
- Bayview, Contra Costa County, California, a census designated place
- Bayview, Idaho
- Bayview, Baltimore, Maryland
- Bayview, Texas
- Bayview, Washington (disambiguation)
- Bayview, Wisconsin, a town
- Bayview–Hunters Point, San Francisco, a neighborhood in San Francisco, California.

=== Fictional ===
- Bayview, a fictional city in the computer and video game Need for Speed: Underground 2
- Bayviev, a fictional city in the books of Karen M. Mcmanus One of us is lying

== Football stadia ==
- Bayview Park, Methil, Fife, Scotland
- Bayview Stadium, Fife, Scotland

== See also ==
- Bay View (disambiguation)
- Bayview Cemetery (disambiguation)
- Bayview Hill (disambiguation)
