= Averhoff Reservoir =

- Location within Texas Location within the United States
- Location: Zavala County, near Crystal City, Texas
- Coordinates: 28°48′N 99°49′W
- Type: reservoir
- Primary inflows: Nueces River
- Primary outflows: Nueces River
- Basin countries: United States
- Surface area: 174 acres (70 ha)
- Max. depth: 28 ft (8.5 m)
- Surface elevation: 600 ft (180 m)

Averhoff Reservoir is a 173-acre narrow, riverine-type reservoir located on the Nueces River 10 mi (16 km) north of the town of Crystal City in Zavala County, Texas, United States, and 100 miles from San Antonio, Texas.

It was constructed by the Zavala-Dimmit Water Improvement District Number 1 in 1948 to provide water for agriculture, recreation, and flood control. The reservoir was formed by the construction of two dams across two channels of the Nueces River. The dam and lake are managed by the Zavala-Dimmit County Water Impound District. Averhoff Reservoir also serves as a venue for recreation, including fishing and boating.

The surface area is 174 acres with a maximum depth of 28 feet. It has a normal water level of 600 ft. msl with severe fluctuations of 15 feet or more. It has a normal water clarity being clear to slightly stained.

In 2005 Illinois pondweed, which occurred mainly in the lower point of the reservoir, was the primary aquatic vegetation taking up approximately 4 acres.

== Uses ==
Averhoff Reservoir has been stocked with species of fish intended to improve the utility of the reservoir for recreational fishing. Fish present in Averhoff Reservoir include crappie, catfish, and largemouth bass.

Stocking History for Averhoff

Species	Year	Number Stocked	Size
Bass, Florida Largemouth	2017	18,799	Fingerling
Bass, Florida Largemouth	1998	32,568	Fingerling
Bass, Florida Largemouth	1995	31,969	Fingerling
Bass, Florida Largemouth	1994	31,917	Fingerling
Bass, Palmetto	1983	1,620	
Bass, Palmetto	1981	1,300	
Bass, Palmetto	1979	3,550	

The primary recreational use of the reservoir is fishing. All species are currently managed under statewide regulations.

=== Fishing Cover/Structure ===
Averhoff Reservoir has mud/gravel banks with overhanging brush, and dead standing timber. There is no aquatic vegetation on this reservoir.

=== Tips & Tactics ===
Bass anglers are most successful during the fall, winter, and spring months. Topwater baits such as buzzbaits work well in the early morning and late evening. Texas and Carolina rigged worms and lizards are also popular, and effective when fished around the overhanging brush. Catfish anglers can find channel catfish throughout the lake. Stinkbait and cutbait work well. Crappie anglers should try fishing deep structure in the fall and winter with small jigs fished on light line and tackle. During the spring, fish structure in 3 to 6 feet with small spinners and jigs.
