= Nueces Hotel =

Luxury hotel in Corpus Christi, Texas

Coordinates: 27.7968°N 97.3930°W

The Nueces Hotel as seen in an illustration from the 1940s

The Nueces Hotel in Corpus Christi, Texas, was a luxury hotel that also served the city as a center of social and political life during the early 20th century and was for years the largest building in Texas south of San Antonio.

== Beginnings ==
In the early 1900s, leading Corpus Christi citizens realized that the city needed such a hotel to attract tourists and business and decided to build one downtown. They chose the site of Hopson's meat processing plant and the Anderson family salt mill, including the Andersons' two-story house that also stood on the site. The six-story hotel, built by Ayers and Ayers Architects during a spate of municipal improvements, was completed in 1913, occupying the block between Water Street and Chaparral Streets and having its main entrance on Peoples Street. It was named the Nueces Hotel, also the name of a hotel in La Pryor, Texas. In 1919, wealthy rancher W. W. Jones (1858–1942), who in 1929 built the nearby and still extant Jones Building, bought out the other stockholders to become the sole owner.

== Amenities ==
The Nueces was a large brick building with all the modern amenities, including its own laundry and electric power plant (with Claude L. Stephens as electrical engineer). It had a classical-style lobby with Corinthian columns, decorated ceilings, and marble and tile floors, that was furnished with huge, plush chairs and couches. The sun parlor had fine brickwork, potted plants, area rugs, and wicker furniture, and tall windows admitted abundant daylight, creating a pleasant dining experience with an outdoor atmosphere and indoor comfort; the tropical outdoor garden let guests and others enjoy their meals among palm trees, sheltered by walls from the street and from the prevailing winds that cooled the east lobby. A barbershop and a number of stores were in or near the main lobby, including such specialty stores as Al's Men's Wear and the Hardy Shoe Store.

== Location and staff ==
Originally, the hotel stood almost on the bayshore (Water Street, on its east side, at that time ran along the water's edge), thus was convenient to one of Corpus Christi's main attractions. Until the present landfill and seawall were built, Peoples Street extended out as a covered pier over the water, covered in deference to ladies' modesty, that ended in a pavilion. In 1922, this was replaced with the Pleasure Pier, a similar wooden wharf-like structure for fishing and mooring boats. When the seawall was finished, the water was further from the building, but still within easy walking distance. In 1940, Peoples Street reached to the T-head, a paved parking area shaped like a letter T extending out on the water for fishing and boat slips.

The first manager seems to have been Joe J. Nix. Staff included uniformed bellhops, generally black men, and uniformed Hispanic girls as elevator operators. Pages, according to Theodore Fuller's memoir, were boys whose voices had changed; they wore snappy uniforms that they changed near the kitchen. These were not considered demeaning jobs; bellhop Lincoln Daniels started a long career there in 1914 and as bell captain was liked and trusted by staff and guests. Gilberto S. Revilla, in the 1930s worked in the laundry and met Martina Revilla, who was an elevator operator. They married in 1936 and were married 65 years. Revilla, who died in 2000, requested his 1930s employment at the Nueces Hotel be mentioned with pride in his obituary, and so did Walter Everette Hull, who as a hotel soda jerk once served Congressman Lyndon B. Johnson.

== Activities ==
Microfilm newspapers from the era, preserved in the Corpus Christi Central Library, list advertising that shows prices. Rooms were a dollar per day up. The Club Breakfast started at 25 cents, the Businessman's Lunch at 50 cents. Another ad notes that for Thanksgiving 1915, turkey dinner at the Nueces, including oysters and olives, was one dollar.

In addition to fine food, the Nueces provided professional entertainment, with dances on summer nights and weekends year round. The restaurants featured string quartets, piano, violin, and vocal soloists. A newspaper ad from 1915 promises that Gayle Forbush and Morgan Wheeler of New York City, doubtless well known entertainers in the early 1900s, would perform exhibition dancing daily from 7 to 9 pm. St. Cecilia's Orchestra, which is described as "Mexican", meaning in the context of the times that the members were Hispanic and not necessarily Mexican nationals or persons who played Tejano music, performed the dance music every summer evening and once a week year round.

Not all entertainment was sedate. Soon after the hotel opened, a tightwire, or tightrope walker crossed Peoples Street six floors up from the City National Bank to the Nueces. Another time not long after, a "human fly" scaled the hotel without ropes, pretending to lose his grip a few times to thrill the audience below.

== Organizations ==
The Nueces became a meeting place for Corpus Christi and South Texas leaders. Mr. Jones liked to spend part of the day in the plush lobby talking over old times with other ranchers. The barbershop had a shelf for the personal shaving mugs of prominent citizens who regularly patronized it. Some lived there part- or full-time. Pat Dunn, known as "the Duke of Padre Island" because he had owned much of the land there that later became county and federal parks and housing subdivisions, finally moved into town and lived at the Nueces. He died in his hotel room in March 1935. Much of the business—government, private, and cultural—of south Texas was said to have been conducted at the Nueces during the first part of the century.

An incident involving some community leaders on March 7, 1916, was reported in The Corpus Christi Caller the next day, Ash Wednesday, and again by local historian Murphy Givens in the Ash Wednesday edition for 2016. Incited by a Reverend Ham's fiery sermons in favor of alcohol prohibition, R. I. Blucher and Tom Cahill began fighting outside the door of the Nueces Hotel and were stopped by a policeman upon which Matthew Dunn told the officer to let Blucher go, threatening him with his cane. Sheriff Mike Wright "slapped him in the face" according to the 1916 article, which mentions that "several hundred people" witnessed the fray. The officers took "Blucher & Cahill to city hall, walking west along Peoples Street". The 1916 article suggested no charges would likely be filed; the reverend soon packed his tent and left town.

Evidence of the hotel's formal participation in public affairs is easily found though of course "back-room" dealings have left little trace. In 1913, the Texas section of the American Society of Civil Engineers was established by the Texas Good Roads Association in a meeting at the Nueces. One of the few remaining early local newspapers reports that the Texas Daughters of the Confederacy met there in November 1915. The Woman's Monday Club met on July 12, 1916, when Mrs. G. R. Scott, president of City Federation of Women's Clubs, gave a lecture on her New York trip to the 13th biennial meeting of the American Federation of Women's Clubs. In early 1923, the Corpus Christi Golf and Country Club hosted the second link in a professional winter golf tour, ending with a banquet at the Nueces, where prizes were awarded by toastmaster Joseph Hirsch. Jones' daughter Lorinda, a member of the La Retama Club that founded the Corpus Christi library system, donated free office space to the Junior League (originally the Junior Assistance Club) in the Nueces—and in 1937 donated the family's original mansion to the library. In 1938, the Buccaneer Days Commission met and established their headquarters on the hotel mezzanine floor; their purpose was to start Buccaneer Days in place of Splash Day (established 1917) as a civic festival and tourist attraction. The Old Bayview Cemetery Association, dedicated to making the oldest downtown cemetery a state monument, met there in May 1940. The Texas chapter of CPAs was established during a meeting there in the fall of 1947. The C. C. Harmonairs, dedicated to barbershop singing, established the first local barbershop quartet chapter at the Nueces in 1948.

In 1947, a baby boy was found abandoned in a room rented to a couple who had registered under what turned out to be false names. According to hotel clerk Joseph Sears, the baby had a note with him to the effect that he was "born without a daddy". George de Mohrenschildt, who was involved or at least suspected to have been involved in the assassination of President John F. Kennedy, mentioned in his 1964 testimony that while staying at the Nueces in the 1940s, he was harassed by the Federal Bureau of Investigation.

== Hurricanes ==
The Nueces was a sanctuary in two natural disasters before 1920. One was the hurricane of 1916, which struck on August 18 of that year. About 500 people found sanctuary in the building, over a thousand were evacuated from North Beach (the sand bar island across the mouth of the Nueces River), the boat Pilot Boy in Port Aransas was lost, the roof was blown off Lichtenstein's department store, and about 116 people were killed. The hotel stood up to the storm.

The second was the hurricane of September 11, 1919, the worst natural disaster to hit Corpus Christi. Again, people found refuge in the hotel, but this time the tidal surge poured through downtown, destroying houses and businesses and reaching to the hotel's second floor before rushing back out into the bay. The lobby was flooded, its furniture floating among debris that included a dead horse. Windows were blown out and people huddled in the lightless hallways of upper floors. Downtown was left a jumbled mass of lumber, masonry and glass, vehicles and boats, and often oil-drenched bodies of people and animals, with only the strongest structures remaining. Again, the Nueces stood up to the storm, but the city was devastated and an uncertain number of people, hundreds if not more, were killed. The 1919 storm motivated the city to construct the seawall.

== 1920s-1950s ==
Despite this, the town and the hotel prospered through the 1920s. Railroad service was constantly improved, and in 1926, Corpus Christi's deepwater port was opened. More hotels were built, and in 1928, Jones added a 103-room wing to the Nueces. Despite the next decade's economic troubles, there still seemed a measure of prosperity. A fire broke out in a penthouse-level repair shop in 1938, with spectators on the street watching the fire department and shouting suggestions, but it appears to have been more spectacle than disaster. In 1939, when the Naval Air Station was being built, so many people came to work on it that the hotels were full and the Nueces set up extra beds in the Sun Room. The hotel maintained its status through the Great Depression, the World War II years, and into the 1950s.

The Nueces of this period is mentioned in at least one work of fiction, the young people's novel Lone Star by Barbara Barrie, published in 1990. A girl from Chicago moves with her family to Corpus Christi in 1944. Riding with her father on a Sunday night, she sees the town dark and only the hotel's "flickering" neon sign is on, casting alternate red and blue light on the sidewalk.

== Downfall ==
During the 1950s, the Nueces began to lose out to the new crop of hotels and motels, perhaps making less and less of the money needed to maintain it, and suffering the occasional battering by hurricanes. It was then no longer the civic and cultural meeting place it had been. The Jones heirs finally decided to sell it, and in 1961, Joseph Barshop of San Antonio bought it, operating it as a hotel until 1967, when it became a retirement home.

After surviving many storms, the Nueces was at last badly damaged by Hurricane Celia on August 3, 1970. Celia was more of a wind storm, with gusts over 200 mph, and did comparatively little damage by tidal surge. The storm knocked down brick walls and flung signs, pieces of metal, wooden timbers, and other debris through the air and sometimes through buildings. Downtown was piled with rubble. The Nueces Hotel was deemed too badly damaged to be worth saving.

== Aftermath ==
The fixtures and various items such as ash trays and dinnerware bearing the hotel name were sold to the public, and some things such as the lobby clock and the "flickering" neon sign ending up in the Corpus Christi Museum. In 1971, Braselton Construction Company demolished the hotel. On the site, Barshop built a new inn, the La Quinta Royale, which opened in September 1973 with Mayor Jason Luby cutting the ribbon. A historical marker there commemorates the Nueces.
