= Las Colonias, Texas =

- former CDP
- Coordinates: 28°42′44″N 99°49′10″W
- Country: United States
- State: Texas
- County: Zavala

Area
  - Total: 13.6 sq mi (35.2 km^{2})
  - Land: 13.6 sq mi (35.1 km^{2})
  - Water: 0.039 sq mi (0.1 km^{2})
- Elevation: 600 ft (183 m)

Population (2000)
  - Total: 283
  - Density: 21/sq mi (8.1/km^{2})
- Time zone: UTC-6 (Central (CST))
  - Summer (DST): UTC-5 (CDT)
- FIPS code: 48-41563
- GNIS feature ID: 1852725

Las Colonias was a census-designated place (CDP) in Zavala County, Texas, United States. The population was 283 at the 2000 census. Prior to the 2010 census, parts of this former CDP were used to create the new Amaya and Loma Grande CDPs.

== Geography ==
Las Colonias was located at 28°42′44″N 99°49′10″W (28.712295, -99.819576).

According to the United States Census Bureau, the CDP had a total area of 13.6 square miles (35.2 km^{2}), of which, 13.6 square miles (35.1 km^{2}) of it is land and 0.04 square miles (0.1 km^{2}) of it (0.29%) is water.

== Demographics ==
Historical population
Census	Pop.	Note	%±
2000	283		—
U.S. Decennial Census; 1850–1900 1910; 1920 1930 1940; 1950 1960 1970; 1980 1990 2000; 2010

Las Colonias was first listed as a census designated place prior to the 2000 U.S. census. It was deleted prior to the 2010 U.S. census with parts of its territory used to form the Amaya CDP and Loma Grande CDPs.

Las Colonias CDP, Texas – Racial and ethnic composition Note: the US Census treats Hispanic/Latino as an ethnic category. This table excludes Latinos from the racial categories and assigns them to a separate category. Hispanics/Latinos may be of any race.
Race / Ethnicity (NH = Non-Hispanic)	Pop 2000	% 2000
White alone (NH)	24	8.48%
Black or African American alone (NH)	0	0.00%
Native American or Alaska Native alone (NH)	0	0.00%
Asian alone (NH)	0	0.00%
Pacific Islander alone (NH)	0	0.00%
Other race alone (NH)	0	0.00%
Mixed race or Multiracial (NH)	0	0.00%
Hispanic or Latino (any race)	259	91.52%
Total	283	100.00%

As of the census of 2000, there were 283 people, 76 households, and 68 families residing in the CDP. The population density was 20.9 people per square mile (8.1/km^{2}). There were 95 housing units at an average density of 7.0/sq mi (2.7/km^{2}). The racial makeup of the CDP was 78.09% White, 20.14% from other races, and 1.77% from two or more races. Hispanic or Latino of any race were 91.52% of the population.

There were 76 households, out of which 51.3% had children under the age of 18 living with them, 80.3% were married couples living together, 7.9% had a female householder with no husband present, and 10.5% were non-families. 9.2% of all households were made up of individuals, and 2.6% had someone living alone who was 65 years of age or older. The average household size was 3.72 and the average family size was 4.00.

In the CDP, the population was spread out, with 36.7% under the age of 18, 8.5% from 18 to 24, 27.6% from 25 to 44, 14.5% from 45 to 64, and 12.7% who were 65 years of age or older. The median age was 28 years. For every 100 females, there were 106.6 males. For every 100 females age 18 and over, there were 98.9 males.

The median income for a household in the CDP was $9,583, and the median income for a family was $15,568. Males had a median income of $11,146 versus $0 for females. The per capita income for the CDP was $11,754. About 65.5% of families and 66.2% of the population were below the poverty line, including 85.7% of those under the age of eighteen and 52.9% of those 65 or over.

== Education ==
Las Colonias was served by the Crystal City Independent School District.
