= Crystal City Correctional Center =

Private prison near Crystal City, Texas

Coordinates: 28.746966°N 99.844226°W

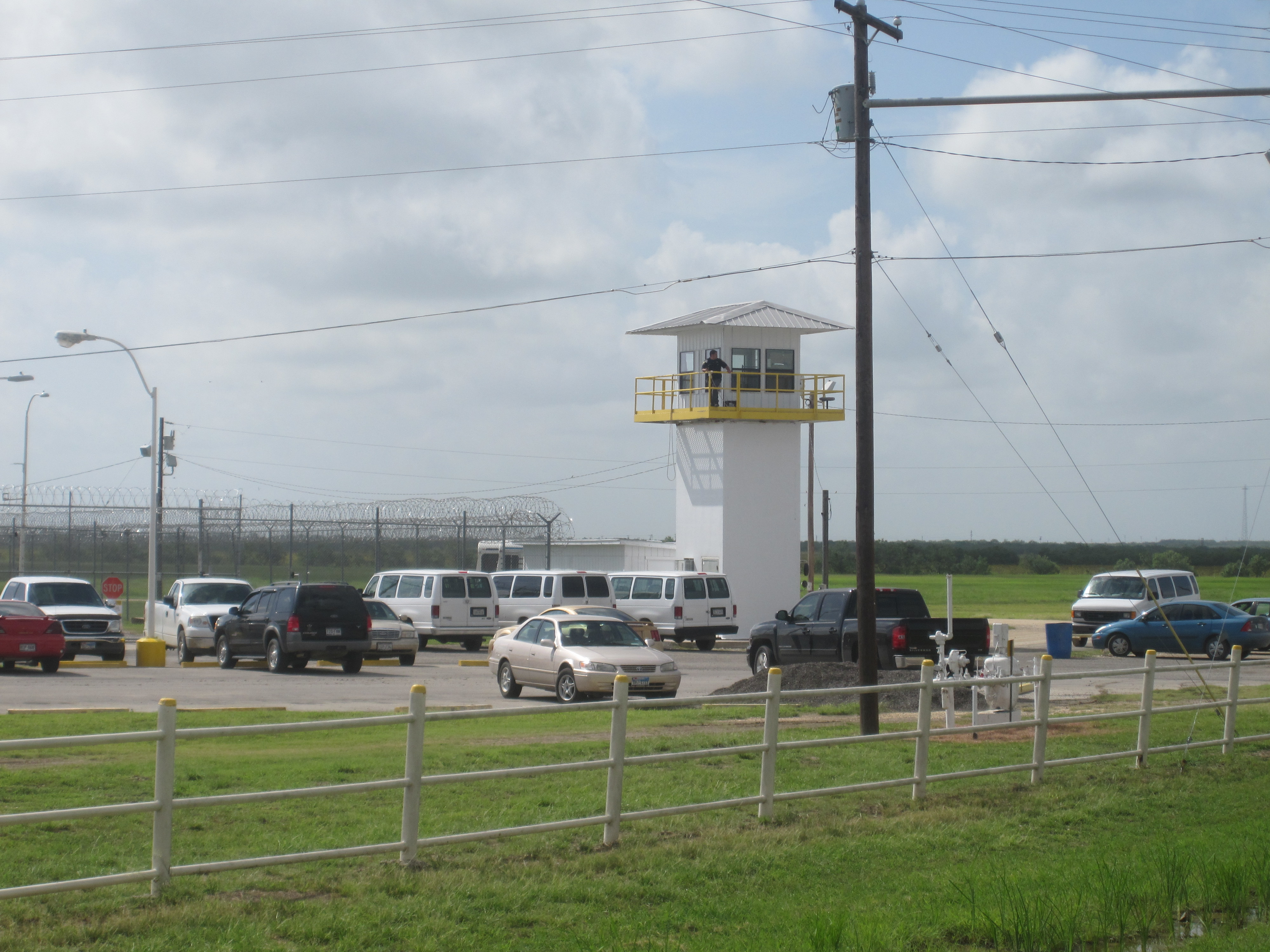
- Interactive map of Crystal City Correctional Center
- Location: 6901 US-83 Crystal City, Texas
- Status: closed
- Security class: medium
- Capacity: 515
- Opened: July 1993
- Closed: May 2, 2012

Crystal City Correctional Center is a closed private prison near Crystal City, Texas. It is about 40 miles (64 km) from the Mexico–United States border.

The prison had spaces for 515 prisoners. The prison was previously one of the largest employers in the Crystal City area, and it housed prisoners from a variety of jurisdictions, including federal prisoners.

== History ==
The prison opened in July 1993, a project financed by the municipality, which has a long history of corruption, political infighting, and criminal investigations. As of June 1994, the facility was managed by the Dove Development Corporation under a contract with the Texas Department of Criminal Justice. (Dove's only other operation was the Frio Detention Center in Pearsall, Texas), for the same client.)

Before its closure in 2012, the prison was marked by its changes in ownership and multiple cancelled contracts.

Beginning in June 1995 the facility housed inmates from Missouri and Utah. The Missouri inmates rioted in February 1996, battering down a control door and setting fire to one section. No Utah inmates were involved in the rioting, but three had previously escaped from Crystal City, and another three from Frio. The Missouri prisoners were withdrawn in August 1996 after another two murderers had escaped.

In late May 1997 Hawaii sent its first prisoners to Crystal City. As of 1997 the prison housed 62 female prisoners, 95% of them being mothers, from Hawaii. The state pulled out of the contract in August, 1998 due to "sanitation problems and lack of programs".

The prison also housed several hundred excess pretrial prisoners from the Bexar County, Texas jail. Franky Salinas, one of the Bexar prisoners, hanged himself in 2009. In October 2010 another 100 inmates were temporarily transferred from Bexar County jail to Crystal City Correctional Center.

In August 2010, the U.S. Marshals Service engaged the entire facility for federal prisoners, and in December 2011 removed all of them. This occurred due to allegations of sexual abuse of female inmates and smuggling among correctional officers; at least one person was convicted in relation to these allegations. On May 1, 2012 the former prison operator stopped managing the prison. On May 2, 2012 the prison closed.

Emerald Management Corp. of Louisiana had offered to begin managing the prison again so it could reopen, but the Crystal City city council experienced infighting related to the issue. As of that time the Internal Revenue Service asked for $400,000 and bondholders threatened legal action, including foreclosure, since they wanted $9.2 million. Later in May 2012 the city council voted to approve Emerald's request to operate the prison, causing it to reopen.

As of 2015 the prison remained empty, and John MacCormack of the San Antonio Express-News wrote that there are "no signs of reopening."
