= Zavala County Courthouse =

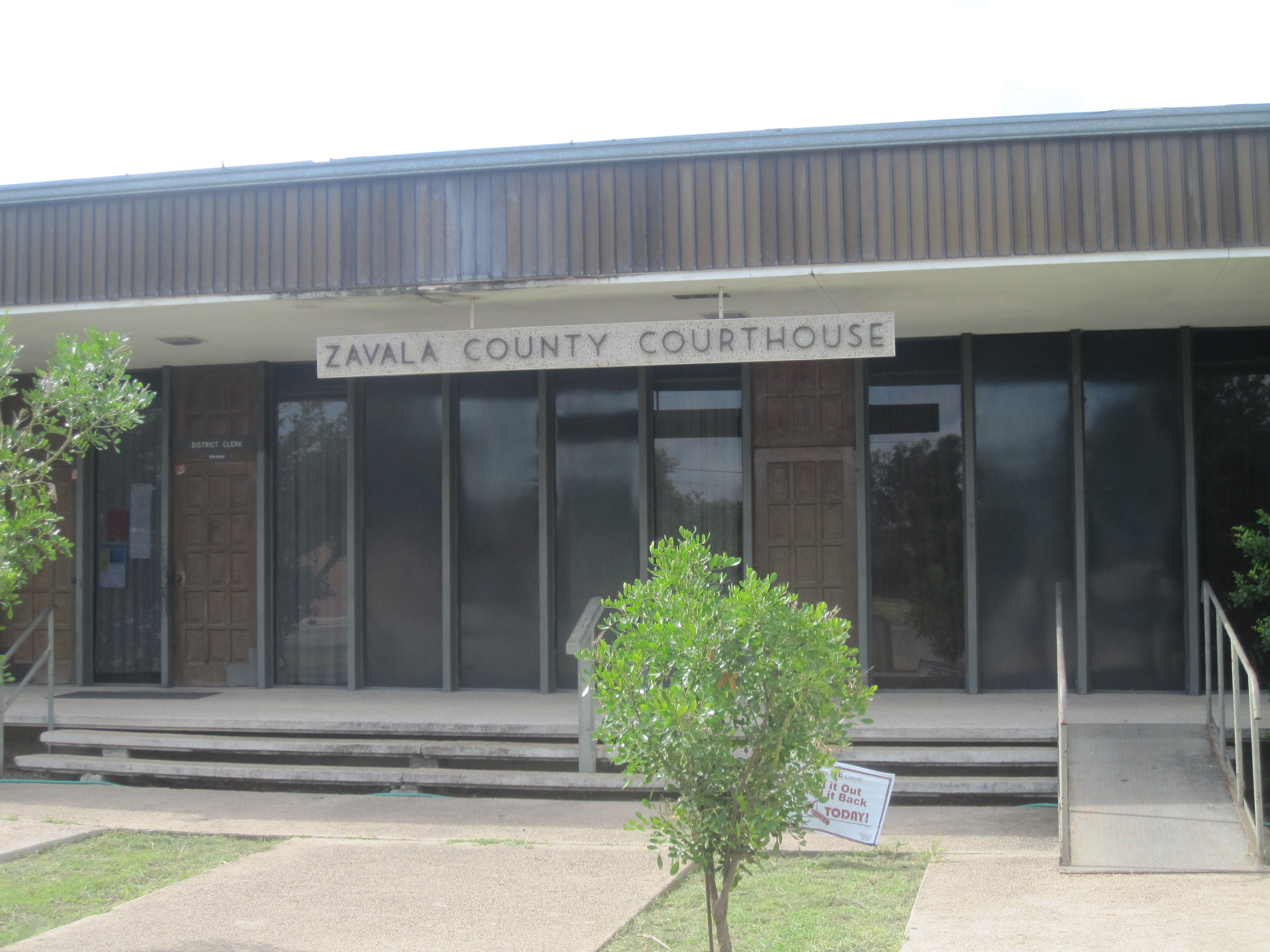
- Zavala County Courthouse (2010)
- Interactive map of the Zavala County Courthouse area

General information
- Architectural style: Modern
- Location: Crystal City, Texas, United States
- Coordinates: 28.6799°N 99.8299°W
- Completed: 1970

Design and construction
- Architect: Gene P. Hobart

Zavala County Courthouse is a courthouse in Crystal City, Texas.

== History ==
The first courthouse was constructed in 1885, in Batesville, the second was built in Crystal City in 1928. The current Courthouse was built in 1970, and designed by architect Gene P. Hobart in a modern style.

== See also ==
- National Register of Historic Places listings in Zavala County, Texas
