= La Pryor Independent School District =

School district in Texas, United States

La Pryor Independent School District is a public school district based in the community of La Pryor, Texas (USA).

In addition to La Pryor, the district also serves rural areas in northwestern Zavala County.

In 2018, the school district was rated "academically acceptable" by the Texas Education Agency.

== Schools ==
- La Pryor High (Grades 7-12)
- La Pryor Elementary (Grades PK-6)
