= Bayview Hill (disambiguation) =

Bayview Hill is a prominent hill contained within Bayview Park in San Francisco, California.

Bayview Hill may also refer to:

- Bayview Hill, Ontario, a neighborhood in Richmond Hill, Ontario, part of the Greater Toronto Area
- Bayview Hill Elementary School, a school in Richmond Hill, Ontario

== See also ==
- Bayview (disambiguation)
- Bay View (disambiguation)
