= Old Bayview Cemetery =

Cemetery in Corpus Christi, Texas, U.S.

Coordinates: 27°48′4.8″N 97°23′57.8″W

Old Bayview Cemetery is a cemetery located on a small hill in downtown Corpus Christi, Texas, United States, on Ramirez St. at Padre St., bordered by the I-37 access road. It is the oldest federal military cemetery in Texas. Owned by the City of Corpus Christi, it presently comprises three and a half acres as a Historic Texas Cemetery and a State Archaeological Landmark of the Texas Historical Commission. The cemetery was listed on the National Register of Historic Places in 2020.

== Origin ==
Bayview Cemetery originated in 1845 during the occupation of Corpus Christi, or "Kinney's Ranch", by General Zachary Taylor. Taylor commanded the troops that were sent to the region when Texas joined the United States. Mexico claimed the Nueces River as Texas' southern border, while Texas and the United States claimed the Rio Grande as the border. In 1846 Taylor's forces marched south to Mexico.

Since Corpus Christi Bay was too shallow for troop ships, these anchored at what's now Port Aransas and troops were ferried to the military camp on the city bayfront. On 13 September (some versions say 12 September) 1845 the steamboat Dayton left Corpus Christi heading toward St. Joseph's Island (AKA San José Island, north of Port Aransas). On board were Captain Crossman, Lieutenants Thaddeus Higgins, Benjamin A. Berry, Graham, and Woods of the Fourth Infantry, Lieutenant Gordon of the Third Infantry, a Dr. Crittenden, and several others. At about 12:30 PM near McGloin's Bluff, present day Ingleside, a boiler burst.

Eight persons were killed, including Higgins and Barry and a Private Hunt. Seventeen others were injured, among them Graham and Crossman. Woods, Gordon, and Dr. Crittenden were uninjured. The Dayton sank. According to the Nueces County Historical Society, two of the injured later died and a body was recovered, apparently after a day or so.

Colonel Henry Kinney, the founder of the city of Corpus Christi and the main landowner, donated a hill overlooking the shoreline and the Nueces River and probably a vista of woods and meadowland to the west, as the cemetery. Due to "delays" the military funerals were held after sunset, with the services read by lamplight and three volleys fired over the graves. Taps was played and the company left to fife and drums.

The Dayton casualties may not have been the first buried there. The Corpus Christi Caller Times for 14 September 1884 published an interview with a soldier who'd been in Taylor's army, John Henderson, who stated that during the summer several soldiers got sick with diarrhea from "impure water" and that one who died, a German named Engenspiehl, was buried on the same hill. It is certain that other soldiers who died before Taylor's army left lie there.

== City cemetery ==
Known as "The Graveyard" and "old Military Cemetery" before becoming Bayview, the cemetery replaced an older one at Nuecestown, some fifteen miles (24 km) upriver and also founded by Kinney.

Local historian Leila M. Webb, as quoted in the cemetery's website, wrote in 1957 that "No lots were ever sold in this cemetery, which served as the only burying ground for almost half a century." She noted that it "was said to have resembled a regular 'potters' field' and everyone who died was buried there, regardless of color, race, or creed." Relatively unusual for the times, black, hispanic, and white persons were laid to rest together.

The cemetery was fenced by the 1860s, according to one account to keep Texas longhorn cattle out. In 1868 one Doswell donated some land and in the 1870s a new fence was constructed. Family plots were fenced by those who could afford to do so. Each family took care of its own area, showing up for all day meetings and dinner when they came to clear weeds and do any needed restoration.

== Soldiers, pioneers, community leaders ==
Originally a military cemetery, Old Bayview is the final resting place of about eighty veterans of five wars who hail from fourteen different countries and twenty-six U. S. states. There are veterans of the War of 1812, the Texas Revolution, the Mexican–American War, both sides of the American Civil War, and the Spanish–American War as well as of conflicts between the settlers and Indians.

Texas Revolutionary soldiers include George W. Hockley, who was Inspector General of the Texas Army during the Battle of San Jacinto and Texas Secretary of War in 1838, and William Gamble (or Gambel) (1808–1877), who was in Sam Houston's army before becoming a rancher and judge in Live Oak County. Some who were with Taylor's army returned to live in Corpus Christi and are buried there. Texans who fought on both sides of the Civil War are buried there and so are Henry Chapman and William Warfield, black Union soldiers who arrived with the Federal occupation.

During the time of the cemetery's greatest usage most people in Corpus Christi could be described as pioneers. Alejo Hernandez (1842–1875) was born in Aguascalientes, Mexico and became the first Methodist minister to preach in that country. Tito P. Rivera (1843–1894), who was captured by Comanches at age nine and forced to be an interpreter till released at age twelve, fought in the Civil War and became a leading merchant. Captain Henry W. Berry (1818–1888) came with Taylor's army and became the first Nueces County sheriff before being tax collector–assessor, then mayor from 1857 to 1862. Matthew Nolan was orphaned in childhood, fought in the Mexican–American War, and then became sheriff in which job he was shot to death in 1864. Mrs. Matilda Roscher Darby (1880–1911) is described as a "member of pioneer families". Mary Guilmenot is described as a "negro woman" who was born in Matagorda, Texas and moved to Indianola then Corpus Christi. There she married George Guilmenot Jr., had a large family, and died at age 80 in 1938.

Of black persons during that time when racial segregation was being legislated, some of the earliest buried having been slaves of white cemetery occupants, about forty are thought to lie there, the last interred in the 1980s. Also buried here is a Buffalo Soldier, George Owens, who played a part in the Union army, and was honored with a historical marker in February, 2019.

Many individuals prominent in the little-known history of south Texas are buried there. Captain John W. Fitch (1832–1910) was born in Pittsburgh, Pennsylvania and came to Texas in 1850. He was the first sheriff in Bee County before moving to Nueces County, and worked for Richard King of King Ranch fame. He was a captain in the Confederate forces under John Salmon Ford ("Rip" Ford) and a Texas Ranger. In 1877 he bought a ranch in Nueces County, moved to San Antonio in 1899 where he lived until 1905 when he sold his business to live in Boerne. In 1868 he married Avaline Byington of Banquete, Texas and raised a large family. Dr. T. Somervell Burke (1836–1891) was a Confederate veteran born in Mississippi who for many years ran the quarantine station at Port Aransas. His "funeral cortage was one of the largest ever seen in Corpus Christi" says his obituary, and businesses closed for the service.

Felix Anton von Blucher (1819–1878) is the great-nephew of the Field Marshal von Blũcher who led German forces at the Battle of Waterloo. (In Texas records the spelling is usually anglicized.) He was born in Poglow, Mechlenburg, Germany, studied engineering, learned four modern languages plus Latin in addition to his native German, and served in the Prussian army before immigrating. In 1845 he was at New Braunfels, Texas where he helped draft a treaty with the Comanche before going to Mexico. In 1849 he came to Corpus Christi where he surveyed school lands for Nueces County, helped draft the City Charter and inserted the amendment requiring a ship channel to Aransas Pass. He selected the site for and built a water tank to deal with droughts (drafting an ordinance to keep hogs out of it), and in 1853 surveyed the military road to Eagle Pass, Texas. In the Confederate army he planned and oversaw the defense of Corpus Christi, which endured artillery barrages by Federal gunboats. He worked in Mexico in 1865, returning in 1873; in 1875 he surveyed Zapata County. On a trip to Germany in 1849 he married Maria Augusta Emme (1827–1893), an aristocratic and wealthy girl who accompanied him to become a pioneer woman, albeit of the local elite. She taught classes in music and Spanish and bore six children. Her letters and other writings, edited by Bruce S. Cheeseman, were published in 2002 as Maria von Blũcher's Corpus Christi.

Benjamin Franklin Neal (179?–1873) was the first mayor of Corpus Christi. Born in Virginia between 1792 and 1796 and trained as a lawyer, he arrived in Refugio County in 1838. In 1839 he sided with the Mexican Federalists whom he helped conquer Monterrey. He was Chief Justice of Refugio County 1840 to 1845, where he bought the San Luis Advocate, moving it to Galveston in 1841 and bought the Galveston News. In 1846 he moved to Corpus Christi, founding and publishing the Nueces Valley 1852 to 1870. About 1850 he married Eleanor Rebecca O'Neil, who bore one child and died of yellow fever in 1852, after which he married Azubah Haines. He practiced law and was elected mayor of the newly incorporated city in 1852 and 1855. From 1859 to 1860 he prospected gold in what's now Arizona and returned wealthy in time to command the local artillery battery as a Confederate major and to serve as a judge. During Reconstruction he was deposed, restored, and deposed from that position before becoming judge of the Nueces-Karnes County District until 1870.

Biographical notes on most identified cemetery occupants are available online at the links given below.

== Disasters ==
The Old Bayview Cemetery's website lists several large-scale events that apparently contributed occupants. The Mexican–American War is the first and most obvious since the cemetery was established for soldiers who died during the initial occupation.

Corpus Christi was the site of small-scale Civil War action. Historian Eugenia Reynolds Briscoe gives a fairly detailed account of this, beginning with the tightening of the Federal naval blockade in January 1862. Corpus Christi was central to commerce with Mexico that the Union needed to stop. Under Lt. S. W. Kittredge Union forces took Port Aransas and Mustang Island in July, using the yacht Corypheus and steamship Sachem. Able to enter Corpus Christi Bay, these ships shelled the city during attempts to take it. The struggle moved back and forth for the remainder of the war, with the federals now loosening and now regaining their grip, holding Mustang Island, while engaging in actions in Corpus Christi and Flour Bluff to the southeast and on Mustang Island. Federal troops now and then entered the city, a few times landing and fighting the Confederates in what's now downtown Corpus Christi. Kittredge appears an ineffective commander, especially considering that he was captured by the Confederates and replaced by Lt. T. F. Wade, and operations appear to have remained indecisive. The Confederacy progressively weakened as communications and commerce broke down while its armies suffered defeats in the eastern theater. Corpus Christi endured increasing shortages and constant anxiety between confrontations.

Not mentioned on the site are conflicts of Anglo and Hispanic settlers with Indians, usually Comanche or Tonkawa, and raids by outlaw gangs. These small-scale incidents are mentioned, more or less in passing, in memoirs and histories but their losses added up. Casualties of these fights, excluding Indians and the outlaws who seem to have been left where slain or hanged and buried wherever expedient, were interred at the city cemetery; an example is U.S. Army officer Captain Michael E. Van Buren, who died in 1854 as a result of wounds suffered during a fight with Indians.

There were two major outbreaks of yellow fever, in 1854 and 1867. Doctors could do little since neither its cause nor transmission were understood. Sources say measures against its spread consisted of burning victims' bedclothes and placing burning tar buckets about town. In the first outbreak about a third of the town's then 700 inhabitants perished and in the second 300 of a population of 1000.

Hurricanes struck Corpus Christi in October 1871 and again in September 1874. They are recorded as causing considerable damage although casualties are not enumerated.

== Changes and upkeep ==
As early as 1857 there were newspaper editorials urging the upkeep and beautification of the cemetery. Unavoidable damage and vandalism early took their toll. As late as 1942 Corpus Christi, A History and Guide noted that Benjamin F. Sotherville's gravestone showed damage from Federal artillery. The Corpus Christi Daily Gazette for 22 April 1876 claimed that "dastardly acts committed by some ghoul"—apparently digging up plants—required an "ordinance attaching a severe penalty to this outrageous crime." In May 1892 there were similar complaints about stolen flowers.

In 1881 newspapers described the fence as being down in sections and that fences around individual graves and family plots were in "tumble down condition". By 1886 houses surrounded the cemetery. Editorials urged that this situation required a new burial ground and led to the opening of New Bayview Cemetery to which some remains were relocated. Not far away and similarly situated in the Hillcrest area between Kennedy and Peabody streets, it also became surrounded by homes.

A 25 April 1874 essay in the Nueces Valley described the need for an association to "take care of and beautify" the cemetery. On 1 May 1881 E. H. Wheeler wrote in the Semi-Weekly Ledger that he would start a subscription to repair the fence and keep the grounds. The Weelly Caller for 19 May 1893 reported that Mrs. E. J. Kilmer, a local GAR member, had received fourteen tombstones she'd ordered for United States soldiers buried there.

The first Bayview Cemetery Association, founded by newspaperman Eli T. Merriman and his wife, was organized in 1896. The annual meeting was held in January and regular meetings were reported in the newspapers since at least 1898. Mrs. F. J. Weymouth was the Association secretary.

In 1898 the Association entered a contract to "encircle" with a "plank and wire fence" having two gates an area holding 6 acres (24,000 m^{2}), four belonging to the Association, one to the Masonic Lodge, and one to the Knights of Pythias. Lots would be sold and a "free" burial ground lay outside the fence. In August 1906 the Daughters of the Confederacy erected a granite monument to Confederates buried there.

Corpus Christi had already passed the point at which citizens could know one another at least by sight and the number of those who could remember early struggles was diminishing. The first Association continued its work into the twentieth century, gradually tapering off as the original members died. Merriman himself oversaw the cemetery for about ten years until shortly before he died in 1941. Both he and his wife Ellen repose there.

== The career of a monument ==
Although Old Bayview Cemetery continued to receive new burials, other cemeteries were created. Between the years 1914 and 1916, when Rose Hill Cemetery on Comanche Street was opened, a number of remains were removed from Old Bayview Cemetery to be reinterred there as others had been at New Bayview. During this time some families had their relatives removed and reburied in family plots elsewhere, often out of town, but a plan to transport all military personnel to a military cemetery in San Antonio was rejected. Possibly at this time the cemetery was reduced to its present size.

The twentieth century through the 1960s was a time of stringent racial segregation when the area around Old Bayview (and New Bayview) Cemetery lost an early ethnic diversity and became largely a neighborhood of black people. White as well as black persons who remember the time may recall that the neighborhood was called "Harlem" and had a lively, nonsegregated nightlife. Possibly the tensions that did exist then contributed to a lack of maintenance.

West Broadway Street separated the cemetery from railroads that carried freight to the Port of Corpus Christi and from a wastewater treatment plant on a part of the Nueces River that served as a ship channel. The entire region was far different from the quiet semi-wild place where the Dayton casualties were laid to rest.

Memorials were added to the Confederate monument. In 1935 a new marker was placed for Corpus Christi's first mayor, B. F. Neal. In observation of Texas' 1936 centennial the state put a stone memorial over the grave of George W. Hockley and also installed a memorial for all Texans who fought in the Civil War who were buried there and in nearby cemeteries.

Apparently Old Bayview Cemetery was again suffering wear and tear and Texas' centennial had renewed interest in local history because a renewed Old Bayview Cemetery Association met in May 1940 at the Nueces Hotel. Headed in 1942 by Mrs. Sam Rankin, its purpose was to make the cemetery the state monument it did become.

For a while maintenance may not have been routine, since in 1953 a family complete with dogs and rabbits in hutches was living in one corner of the cemetery, burning their trash on graves.

The problem must have been solved, because in 1957 Ms. Webb wrote that "Today the old military cemetery presents an appearance in keeping with its historical associations. Grass and native trees, mesquite and Texas Persimmons, vines, and blooming shrubs lend an air of peace to the hallowed ground while the Stars and Stripes marking each veteran's grave flutter in the cool gulf breeze."

Thirty years later on 26 February 1987 the Corpus Christi Times reported that the Bayview mesquite had died, a venerable tree beside which the Dayton funeral was held that was listed among the Texas Forest Service's "Famous Trees of Texas". The offer of a Cuero, Texas lumber mill "to make something of lasting beauty" of it was taken up. Park Superintendent Mike Gordon said cross sections displaying the growth rings would be made.

== Updating in a new century ==
Old Bayview Cemetery suffered further damage by vandals. Decades of truck and railroad travel along West Broadway, the construction of Corpus Christi's harbor bridge and of I-37 over the previous fifty years and the traffic these and nearby Concrete Street Amphitheater caused damaging vibrations. Much of the surrounding neighborhood had been bought, with some homes and buildings demolished, again altering the nature of the area. On 1 March 2001 the Caller-Times reported some of the damage and a plan by the Nueces County Historical Commission to engage in a detailed study as well as resrotation.

According to the newspaper this began when Rosa G. Gonzales was seeking the grave of a great-great-grandfather, which she did not find, and noticed that the Dayton soldiers had no markers. With the gravesites located she began the project of correcting the situation.

The Historical Commission began putting together a detailed account of what was known about the cemetery. The plan according to the Caller-Times was to "document all stone art forms, trees, fencing, stone curbing", compile a detailed account of what is known about the cemetery, and look for relatives of occupants. This historical and archaeological survey resulted in the creation of a cemetery website in February 2002.

That September, the Caller-Times announced a ceremony for Saturday 21 September 2002, that would be the culmination of the new updating. The Historical Society, descendants of Mexican–American War veterans, and the public were invited. The Dayton markers were to be installed and the Veterans' Band would play Taps. No relatives of the steamboat disaster casualties could be located so a flag would be presented to Goldia Burroughs Hubert, a descendant of General Taylor who lived in Riviera, Texas.
