= Bayview, Washington =

Bayview, Washington may refer to:

- Bayview, Island County, Washington, an unincorporated community in Island County
- Bayview, Pierce County, Washington, an unincorporated community in Pierce County
- Bay View, Washington, a census-designated place in Skagit County
