= Chula Vista, Zavala County, Texas =

Chula Vista, Texas
- CDP
- Coordinates: 28°39′34″N 99°48′25″W
- Country: United States
- State: Texas
- County: Zavala

Area
  - Total: 0.54 sq mi (1.4 km^{2})
  - Land: 0.54 sq mi (1.4 km^{2})
  - Water: 0 sq mi (0.0 km^{2})

Population (2020)
  - Total: 307
  - Density: 570/sq mi (220/km^{2})
- Time zone: UTC-6 (Central (CST))
  - Summer (DST): UTC-5 (CDT)
- Zip Code: 78839
- FIPS code: 48-14882

Chula Vista is a census-designated place (CDP) in Zavala County, Texas, United States. The population was 307 at the 2020 census. Prior to the 2010 census, the CDP was known as Chula Vista-River Spur.

== Geography ==
Chula Vista is located at 28°39′34″N 99°48′25″W (28.659561, -99.806840).

According to the United States Census Bureau, the CDP has a total area of 0.5 square mile (1.4 km^{2}), all land.

== Demographics ==
Historical population
Census	Pop.	Note	%±
2000	400		—
2010	450		12.5%
2020	307		−31.8%
U.S. Decennial Census; 1850–1900 1910; 1920 1930 1940; 1950 1960 1970; 1980 1990 2000; 2010 2020

Chula Vista was first listed as a census designated place as Chula Vista-River Spur in the 2000 U.S. census. The name was change to Chula Vista prior to the 2010 U.S. census.

=== 2020 census ===
Chula Vista CDP (Zavala County), Texas – Racial and ethnic composition Note: the US Census treats Hispanic/Latino as an ethnic category. This table excludes Latinos from the racial categories and assigns them to a separate category. Hispanics/Latinos may be of any race.
Race / Ethnicity (NH = Non-Hispanic)	Pop 2000	Pop 2010	Pop 2020	% 2000	% 2010	% 2020
White alone (NH)	87	7	5	21.75%	1.56%	1.63%
Black or African American alone (NH)	0	0	3	0.00%	0.00%	0.98%
Native American or Alaska Native alone (NH)	0	0	0	0.00%	0.00%	0.00%
Asian alone (NH)	0	0	1	0.00%	0.00%	0.33%
Native Hawaiian or Pacific Islander alone (NH)	0	0	1	0.00%	0.00%	0.33%
Other race alone (NH)	0	1	0	0.00%	0.22%	0.00%
Mixed race or Multiracial (NH)	0	0	1	0.00%	0.00%	0.33%
Hispanic or Latino (any race)	313	442	296	78.25%	98.22%	96.42%
Total	400	450	307	100.00%	100.00%	100.00%

=== 2000 census ===
As of the census of 2000, there were 400 people, 105 households, and 89 families residing in the CDP. The population density was 733.3 inhabitants per square mile (283.1/km^{2}). The 120 housing units averaged 220.0/sq mi (84.2/km^{2}). The racial makeup of the CDP was 65.50% White, 3.00% Native American, 29.00% from other races, and 2.50% from two or more races. Hispanics or Latinos of any race were 78.25% of the population.

Of the 105 households, 54.3% had children under the age of 18 living with them, 63.8% were married couples living together, 13.3% had a female householder with no husband present, and 14.3% were not families. About 11.4% of all households were made up of individuals, and 2.9% had someone living alone who was 65 years of age or older. The average household size was 3.81 and the average family size was 4.17.

In the CDP, the population was distributed as 38.8% under the age of 18, 9.5% from 18 to 24, 27.0% from 25 to 44, 20.8% from 45 to 64, and 4.0% who were 65 years of age or older. The median age was 27 years. For every 100 females, there were 91.4 males. For every 100 females age 18 and over, there were 99.2 males.

The median income for a household was $18,438, and for a family was $25,764. Males had a median income of $40,000 versus $13,523 for females. The per capita income for the CDP was $7,283. About 34.6% of families and 35.9% of the population were below the poverty line, including 30.2% of those under age 18 and 53.3% of those age 65 or over.

== Education ==
Chula Vista is served by the Crystal City Independent School District.
