= Bayview, Texas =

- Town
- Interactive map of Bayview, Texas
- Coordinates: 26°7′46″N 97°24′4″W
- Country: United States
- State: Texas
- County: Cameron

Area
  - Total: 4.61 sq mi (11.95 km^{2})
  - Land: 3.88 sq mi (10.06 km^{2})
  - Water: 0.73 sq mi (1.89 km^{2})
- Elevation: 26 ft (8 m)

Population (2020)
  - Total: 475
  - Density: 122/sq mi (47.2/km^{2})
- Time zone: UTC-6 (Central (CST))
  - Summer (DST): UTC-5 (CDT)
- FIPS code: 48-06140
- GNIS feature ID: 1330174
- Website: https://bayviewtexas.us/

Bayview is a town in Cameron County, Texas, United States. The population was 475 at the 2020 census. It is part of the Brownsville–Harlingen–Raymondville and the Matamoros–Brownsville metropolitan areas.

== Geography ==
Bayview is located in eastern Cameron County at 26°7′46″N 97°24′4″W (26.129573, –97.401165). It is 16 miles (26 km) east of San Benito and 14 miles (23 km) northwest of Port Isabel.

According to the United States Census Bureau, the town has a total area of 4.6 square miles (12.0 km^{2}), of which 3.9 square miles (10.1 km^{2}) is land and 0.73 square miles (1.9 km^{2}), or 15.81%, is water.

== Demographics ==
Historical population
Census	Pop.	Note	%±
1970	312		—
1980	291		−6.7%
1990	231		−20.6%
2000	323		39.8%
2010	383		18.6%
2020	475		24.0%
U.S. Decennial Census; 1850–1900 1910; 1920 1930 1940; 1950 1960 1970; 1980 1990 2000; 2010

=== 2020 census ===
Bayview racial composition (NH = Non-Hispanic) (Note: Note: the US Census treats Hispanic/Latino as an ethnic category. This table excludes Latinos from the racial categories and assigns them to a separate category. Hispanics/Latinos can be of any race.)
Race	Number	Percentage
White (NH)	222	46.74%
Black or African American (NH)	1	0.21%
Asian (NH)	11	2.32%
Some Other Race (NH)	3	0.63%
Mixed/Multi-Racial (NH)	11	2.32%
Hispanic or Latino	227	47.79%
Total	475	

As of the 2020 United States census, there were 475 people, 222 households, and 189 families residing in the town.

=== 2000 census ===
At the 2000 census, there were 323 people, 116 households and 88 families residing in the town. The population density was 115.2 inhabitants per square mile (44.5/km^{2}). There were 133 housing units at an average density of 47.5 per square mile (18.3/km^{2}). The racial makeup of the town was 95.67% White, 0.93% African American, 1.37% Native American, 0.68% from other races, and 2.28% from two or more races. Hispanic or Latino of any race were 29.41% of the population.

There were 116 households, of which 27.6% had children under the age of 18 living with them, 60.3% were married couples living together, 11.2% had a female householder with no husband present, and 23.3% were non-families. 20.7% of all households were made up of individuals, and 13.8% had someone living alone who was 65 years of age or older. The average household size was 2.78 and the average family size was 3.15.

27.6% of the population were under the age of 18, 4.6% from 18 to 24, 23.5% from 25 to 44, 26.3% from 45 to 64, and 18.0% who were 65 years of age or older. The median age was 41 years. For every 100 females, there were 88.9 males. For every 100 females age 18 and over, there were 85.7 males.

Bayview is a city located in Texas. With a 2020 population of 399, it is the 1048th largest city in Texas and the 14291st largest city in the United States . Bayview is currently growing at a rate of 1.27% annually and its population has increased by 4.18% since the most recent census, which recorded a population of 383 in 2010. Bayview reached its highest population of 399 in 2021. Spanning over 5 miles, Bayview has a population density of 103 people per square mile.

The average household income in Bayview is $110,623 with a poverty rate of 2.99%. The median rental costs in recent years comes to - per month, and the median house value is $226,300. The median age in Bayview is 49.3 years, 47.8 years for males, and 51.1 years for females.

The median household income was $46,750 and the median family income was $56,500. Males had a median income of $51,389 and females $38,750. The per capita income was $18,620. About 8.3% of families and 11.3% of the population were below the poverty line, including 19.3% of those under age 18 and 8.8% of those age 65 or over.

== Education ==
Bayview is served by the Los Fresnos Consolidated Independent School District. In addition, residents may apply to schools in the South Texas Independent School District.
