= Crystal City, Texas =

- City
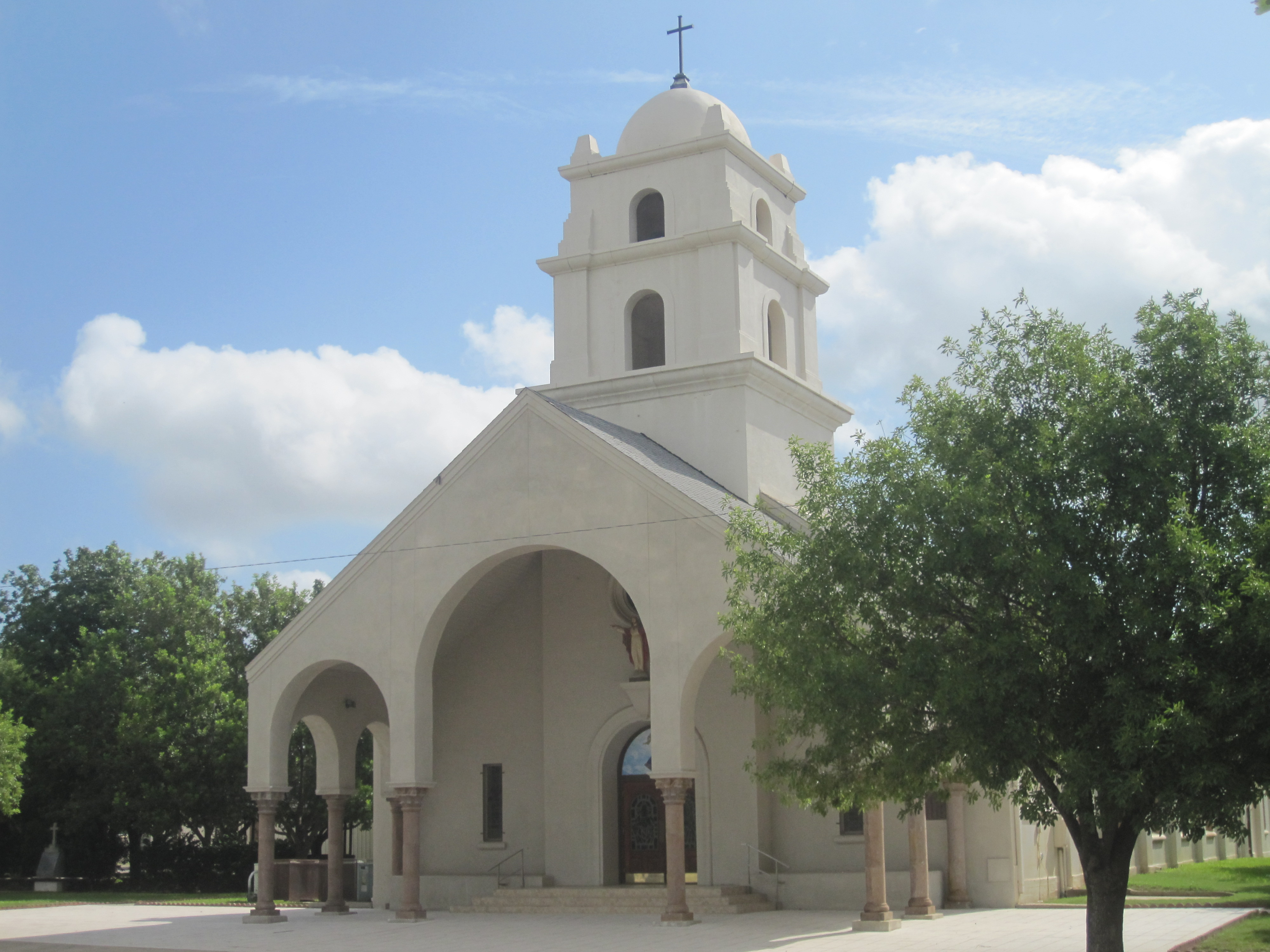
- Sacred Heart Catholic Church in Crystal City
- Nicknames: Crystal, El Vidrio, The Spinach Capital of the World
- Location of Crystal City, Texas

- Location within Texas Location within the United States
- Coordinates: 28°40′39″N 99°49′42″W
- Country: United States
- State: Texas
- County: Zavala
- Founded: 1907
- Incorporated: 1910

Government
  - Mayor: Jose Angel Cerda
  - Mayor Pro-Tem: Andralin Marquez
  - Council Member: Richard Diaz; Alfredo Gallegos; Cecilia Rodriguez Ross

Area
  - Total: 3.675 sq mi (9.518 km^{2})
  - Land: 3.668 sq mi (9.501 km^{2})
  - Water: 0.0069 sq mi (0.018 km^{2}) 0.19%
- Elevation: 560 ft (170 m)

Population (2020)
  - Total: 6,354
  - Estimate (2024): 6,009
  - Density: 1,638.1/sq mi (632.49/km^{2})
- Time zone: UTC–6 (Central (CST))
  - Summer (DST): UTC–5 (CDT)
- ZIP Code: 78839
- Area code: 830
- FIPS code: 48-18020
- GNIS feature ID: 1355449
- Website: crystalcitytx.org

Crystal City is a city in and the county seat of Zavala County, Texas, United States. The population was 6,354 as of the 2020 census, and was estimated at 6,009 in 2024. It was settled as a farming and ranching community and was a major railroad stop being 110 miles (180 km) from San Antonio. Spinach became a major crop and the city has promoted itself as "Spinach Capital of the World." During World War II, a large internment camp was located here. The town is also noteworthy in the history of Mexican American political self-determination for the founding of the La Raza Unida Party.

== History ==
Crystal City was founded in 1907.

=== Farming, ranching, railroad ===
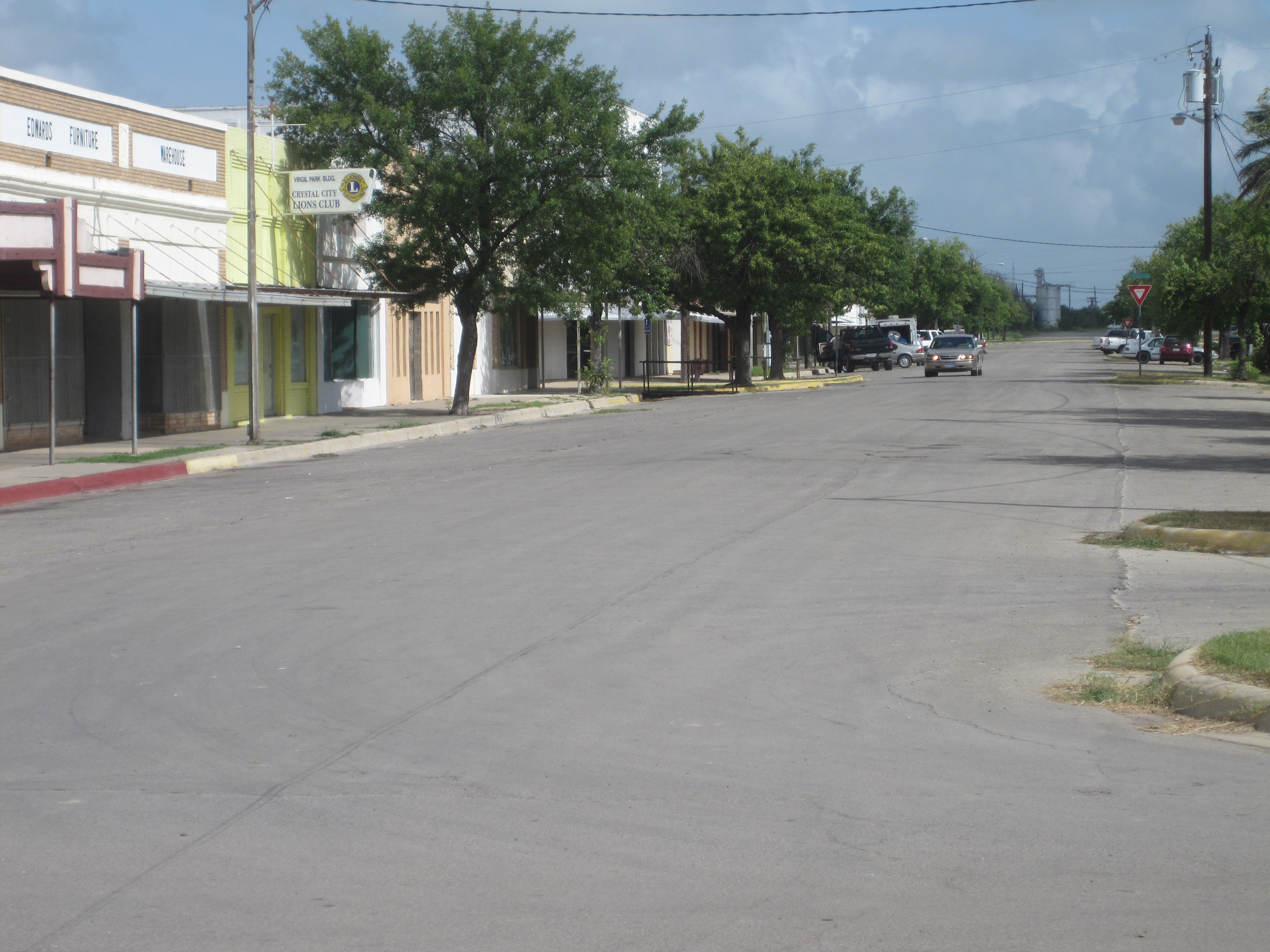
Downtown Crystal City

Crystal City was originally settled by American farmers and ranchers producing cattle and various crops.

The successful production of spinach evolved into a dominant industry. By March 26, 1937, the growers had erected a statue of the cartoon character Popeye in the town because his reliance on spinach for strength led to greater popularity for the vegetable, which had become a staple cash crop of the local economy. Early in its history, the area known as the "Winter Garden District" was deemed the "Spinach Capital of the World" (a title contested by Alma, Arkansas). The first Spinach Festival was held in 1936. It was put on hold during World War II and later years. The festival resumed in 1982. The Spinach Festival is traditionally held on the second weekend in November, and draws former residents (many of them former migrant farm workers) from Michigan, Wisconsin, Minnesota, California, Washington, and beyond.

=== Internment camp ===
During World War II, Crystal City was home to a World War II internment camp which housed American civilians of German, Japanese, and Italian ancestry.

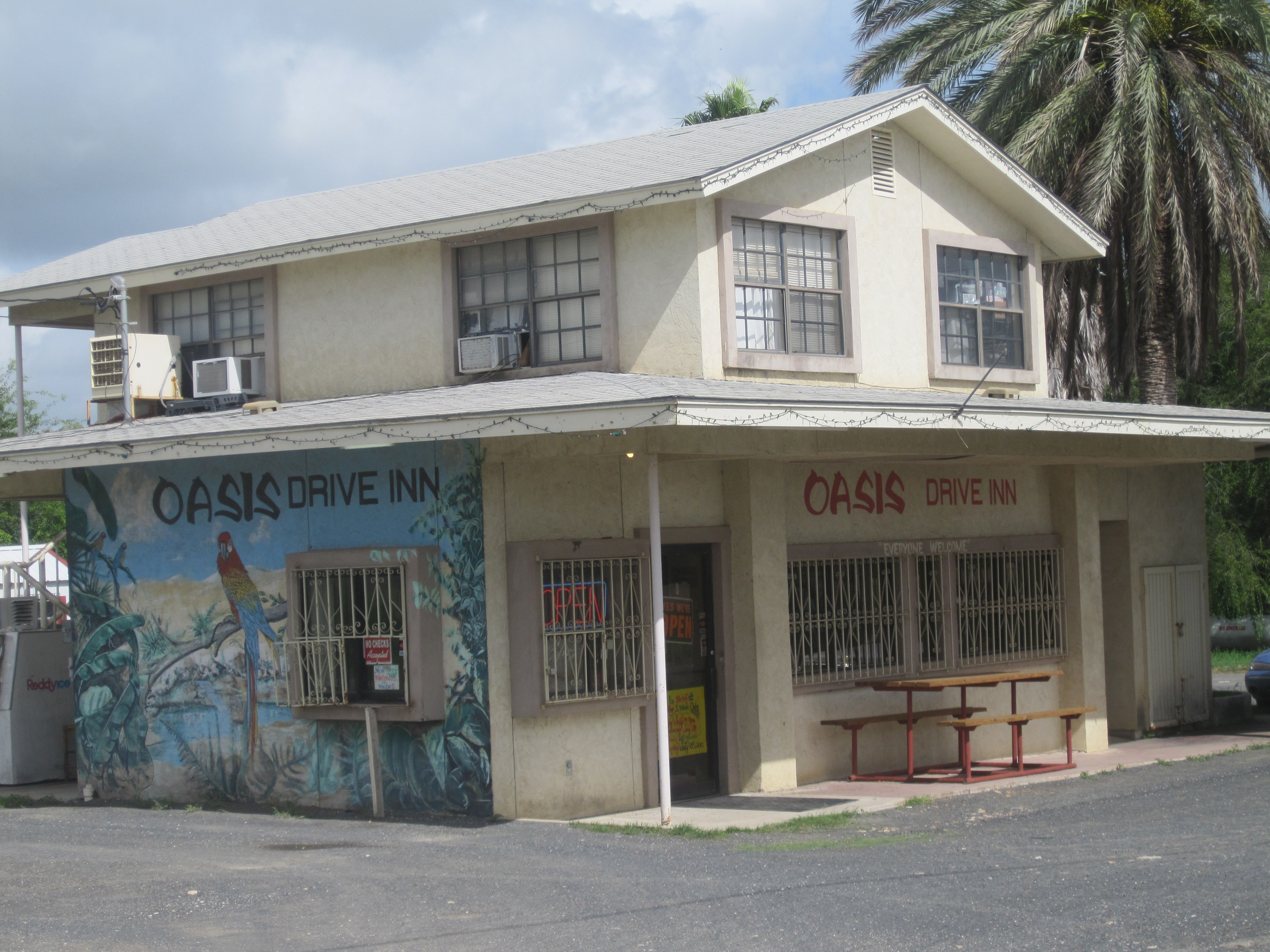
Oasis Drive Inn on U.S. Highway 83 in Crystal City

=== Political activism ===
With the stream of refugees fleeing the Mexican Revolution of 1910, and later added to by Mexican migrant workers lured by the local spinach industry, the demographics of the small rural city began to shift over the years since its 1910 incorporation, due to its proximity to the U.S./Mexico border.

In 1962, Mexican-Americans began to register to vote and were harassed by local police, employers, and especially the Texas Rangers. The Rangers used a range of intimidation tactics, including physical violence/threats and preventing the formation of voter rallies. Several lawsuits resulted, drawing significant press attention. In 1963, the swiftly emerging Mexican-American majority elected an all-Mexican-American city council, led by Juan Cornejo, a local representative of the Teamsters Union at the Del Monte cannery in Crystal City. The newly elected city council, and the succeeding administration, had trouble governing the city because of political factions among the new officials. Cornejo was appointed mayor from among the five new council members. His quest to control the city government eventually led to his loss of political support. Although these five elected officials known as "Los Cinco" only held office for two years, many consider this moment the "spark" or starting point of what became known as the Chicano movement. A new group made up of both Anglos and Mexican Americans, the Citizens Association Serving All Americans, announced its plans to run candidates for countywide offices in 1964, and won.

In 1969, it was no longer allowed for Mexican Americans to speak Spanish in school, and there were no more classes or lessons on Mexican history, culture, or literature, even though Mexican Americans were the majority in Crystal City.

=== Chicano School Walkouts ===
Mexican Americans were, and continue to comprise, the majority of the population of Crystal City. In the late 1960s, over half of these were migrant farmers who would take their children out of school in the spring and sometimes would not return from the migrant circuit until the fall semester had already begun. During the summer interim, government officials and school board members would pass rules and regulations to maintain control of the absentee population. However, not just in these positions of power was the lack of Mexican Americans noticeable. A faculty committee of the local high school ruled that only one Mexican American cheerleader was allowed and the rest had to be Anglo. In the 1969 school year, students were outraged when two cheerleading spots became vacant but Mexican American students were not considered to fill the spots because one Mexican American cheerleader was already on the team. That year, the school board also required that any candidate for cheerleader had to have at least one parent who graduated from the high school. When Mexican American students complained to the superintendent, a new rule was created that stated that there were to be three Mexican American cheerleaders and three Anglo cheerleaders. The Anglo parents complained that the superintendent was "caving in" to the Mexican American students, which resulted in the school board nullifying the superintendent's solution and creating a new resolution stating that any future unrest among the students would be met with expulsion.

Student leaders took their concerns to the school board, who refused to hear their demands, which included the "hiring of more Hispanic teachers and counselors; more classes to challenge students and fewer shop and home economics electives; bilingual-bicultural education at the elementary and secondary levels; Mexican American studies classes to reflect the contributions made by Latinos; and the edition of a student representative to the school board."

After the school board refused to hear their demands, the students staged a walkout on December 9, 1969. Eventually the number of students walking the picket line exceeded 2,000. When elementary and junior high students began to join the walkout, the Texas Education Agency (TEA) sent negotiators in an attempt to get the students back in school. The TEA recommended closing schools early for the Christmas holidays, but the school board nixed this idea.

Texas Senator Ralph Yarborough invited three student leaders to come to Washington, DC, to discuss discrimination in their schools. These students also met with Senators Edward Kennedy and George McGovern, who notified the Civil Rights division of the Department of Justice and the Department of Health, Education, and Welfare of the situation. Texans for the Educational Advancement of Mexican Americans (TEAMA) taught the striking students during the Christmas holidays.

The school board finally agreed to a hearing, and on January 9, 1970, student demands were approved. This victory galvanized the community and that spring, "Mexican American candidates swept the school board and city council elections."

Within two years, the faculty of the school, as well as administrators and the superintendent, reflected the Mexican American majority of the population. The school had an increase in graduating students; a majority were enrolling in some form of higher education. Some of the student leaders of the walkout later held key positions at the school and in government.

=== La Raza Unida Party ===
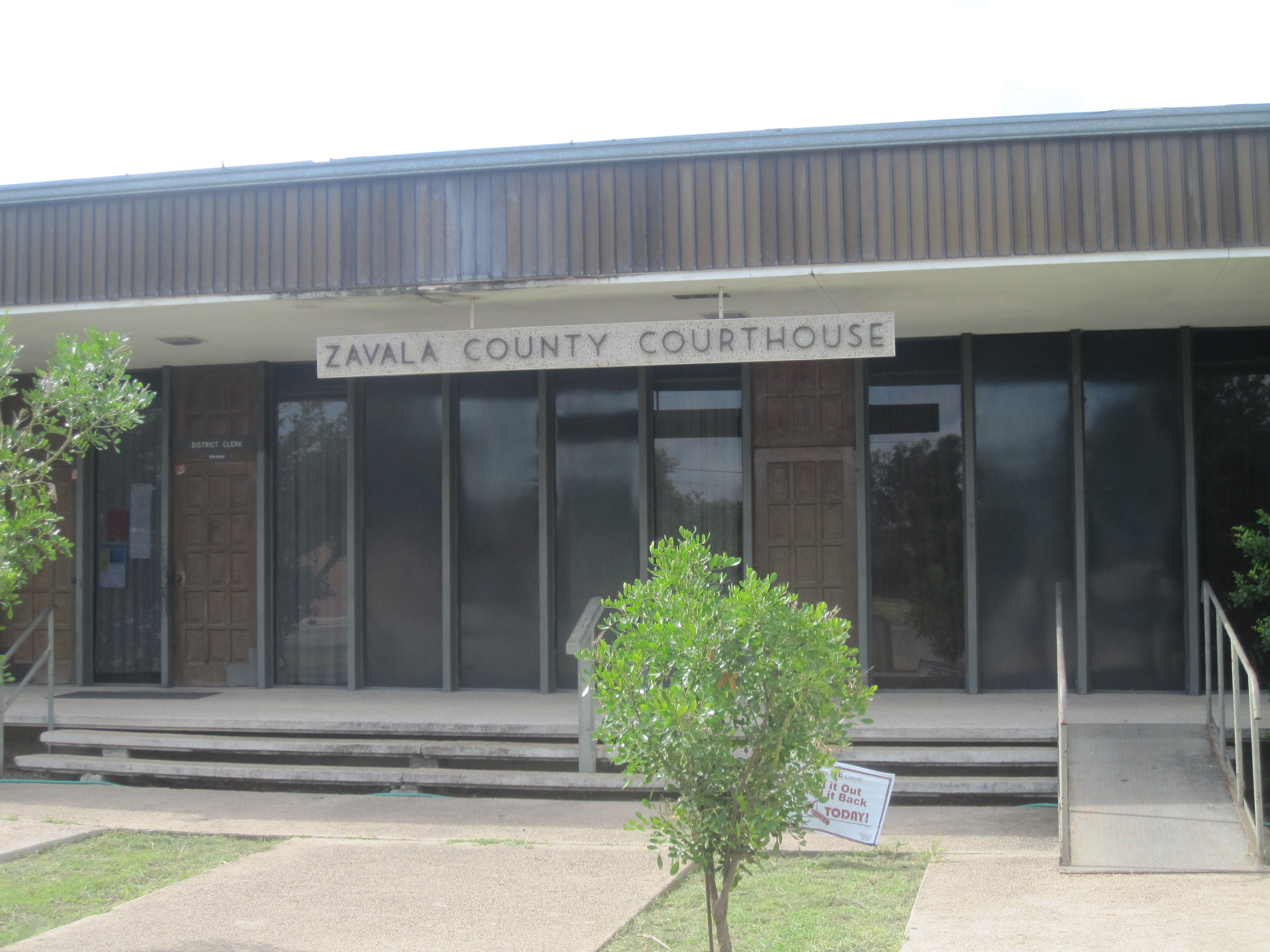
Zavala County Courthouse

By the late 1960s, Crystal City became the location of continued activism in the civil rights movement among its Mexican American majority population, and the birthplace of the third-party political movement known as La Raza Unida Party founded by three Chicanos, including José Ángel Gutiérrez over a conflict about the ethnicity of cheerleaders at Crystal City High School. La Raza Unida, and related organizations, then won election to most offices in Crystal City and Zavala County in the periods between 1969 and 1980, when the party declined at the local level.

In the 1970s, following protests of charges (essentially nonpayment of services) on the part of La Raza Unida, Crystal City's natural gas supply was shut off by its only supplier. Crystal City residents resorted to mostly wood-burning stoves and individual propane gas tanks for cooking.

=== 1976 indictments ===
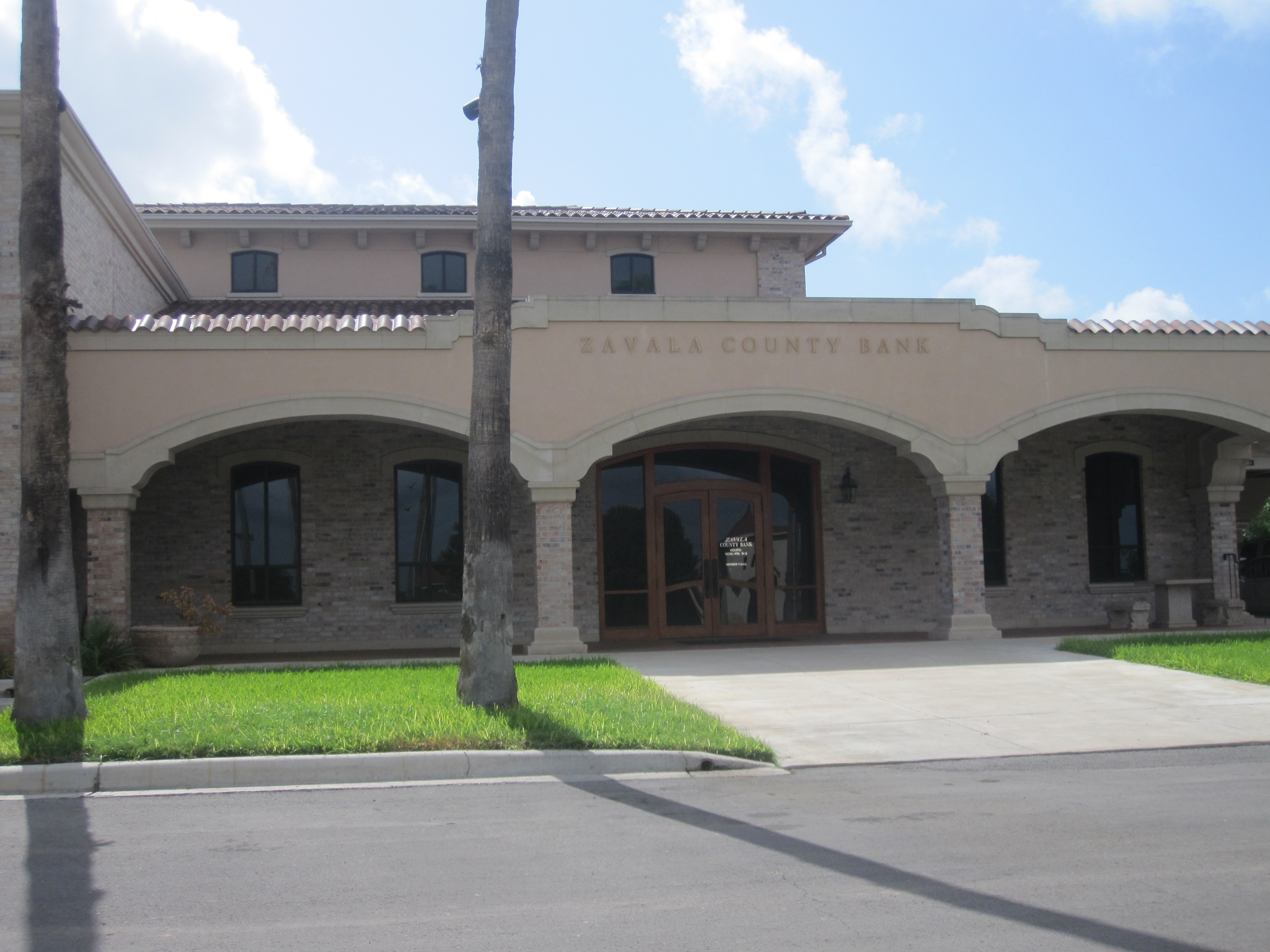
Zavala County Bank in Crystal City

In 1976, 11 officials in Crystal City were indicted on various counts. Angel Noe Gonzalez, the former Crystal City Independent School District superintendent who later worked in the United States Department of Education in Washington, DC, upon his indictment retained the San Antonio lawyer and later mayor, Phil Hardberger. Gonzalez was charged with paying Adan Cantu for doing no work. Hardberger, however, documented to the court specific duties that Cantu had performed and disputed all the witnesses called against Cantu. The jury unanimously acquitted Gonzalez. Many newspapers reported on the indictments, but not on the acquittal. John Luke Hill, the 1978 Democratic gubernatorial nominee, had sought to weaken La Raza Unida so that he would not lose general election votes to a third-party candidate. Victory, however, went not to Hill, but narrowly to his successful Republican rival, Bill Clements. Compean received only 15,000 votes, or 0.6%, just under Clements's 17,000-vote plurality over Hill.

=== Political corruption ===
In February 2016, almost every top official of the city was arrested under a federal indictment accusing them of taking bribes from contractors and providing city workers to assist an illegal gambling operator, Ngoc Tri Nguyen. Included were Mayor Ricardo Lopez, city attorney William Jonas, Mayor pro tem Rogelio Mata, council member Roel Mata, and former council member Gilbert Urrabazo. A second councilman, Marco Rodriguez, was already charged in a separate case with smuggling Mexican immigrants. A week earlier, Lopez was taken into custody for assault and disorderly conduct during a city council meeting in which a recall election to remove two other city council members and him was discussed. In December, Jonas surrendered to authorities after being charged with assault for allegedly manhandling an elderly woman who was trying to enter a city council meeting. That left one councilman free of federal charges.

== Geography ==
According to the United States Census Bureau, the city has a total area of 3.675 square miles (9.52 km^{2}), of which 3.668 square miles (9.50 km^{2}) is land and 0.007 square miles (0.02 km^{2}) (0.19%) is water. Major bodies of water near Crystal City include the Nueces River and Averhoff Reservoir. Soils are well-drained, reddish brown to grayish brown, sandy loam or clay loam of the Brystal, Pryor, and Tonio series; the Brystal is neutral to mildly alkaline and the other two tend to be moderately alkaline.

=== Climate ===
Climate data for Crystal City, Texas (1991–2020)
Month	Jan	Feb	Mar	Apr	May	Jun	Jul	Aug	Sep	Oct	Nov	Dec	Year
Mean daily maximum °F (°C)	66.8 (19.3)	72.2 (22.3)	78.9 (26.1)	86.1 (30.1)	91.1 (32.8)	96.4 (35.8)	97.3 (36.3)	99.1 (37.3)	92.9 (33.8)	85.0 (29.4)	74.1 (23.4)	67.7 (19.8)	84.0 (28.9)
Daily mean °F (°C)	55.3 (12.9)	60.3 (15.7)	67.0 (19.4)	74.0 (23.3)	80.3 (26.8)	85.5 (29.7)	86.4 (30.2)	87.4 (30.8)	82.2 (27.9)	74.3 (23.5)	63.7 (17.6)	56.4 (13.6)	72.7 (22.6)
Mean daily minimum °F (°C)	43.9 (6.6)	48.5 (9.2)	55.1 (12.8)	61.8 (16.6)	69.6 (20.9)	74.6 (23.7)	75.5 (24.2)	75.8 (24.3)	71.5 (21.9)	63.6 (17.6)	53.2 (11.8)	45.1 (7.3)	61.5 (16.4)
Average precipitation inches (mm)	1.04 (26)	0.85 (22)	1.70 (43)	1.31 (33)	2.23 (57)	2.07 (53)	2.07 (53)	1.92 (49)	2.43 (62)	2.00 (51)	1.00 (25)	0.84 (21)	19.46 (495)
Average snowfall inches (cm)	0.0 (0.0)	0.0 (0.0)	0.0 (0.0)	0.0 (0.0)	0.0 (0.0)	0.0 (0.0)	0.0 (0.0)	0.0 (0.0)	0.0 (0.0)	0.0 (0.0)	0.0 (0.0)	0.0 (0.0)	0 (0)
Source: NOAA

== Demographics ==
Historical population
Census	Pop.	Note	%±
1930	6,609		—
1940	6,529		−1.2%
1950	7,198		10.2%
1960	9,101		26.4%
1970	8,104		−11.0%
1980	8,334		2.8%
1990	8,263		−0.9%
2000	7,190		−13.0%
2010	7,138		−0.7%
2020	6,354		−11.0%
2024 (est.)	6,009		−5.4%
U.S. Decennial Census; 2020 Census

According to realtor website Zillow, the average price of a home as of October 31, 2025, in Crystal City is $79,589.

As of the 2023 American Community Survey, there are 2,256 estimated households in Crystal City with an average of 2.7 persons per household. The city has a median household income of $38,598. Approximately 41.1% of the city's population lives at or below the poverty line. Crystal City has an estimated 49.4% employment rate, with 7.5% of the population holding a bachelor's degree or higher and 74.3% holding a high school diploma. There were 2,519 housing units at an average density of 686.75 per square mile (265.2/km^{2}).

The top five reported languages (people were allowed to report up to two languages, thus the figures will generally add to more than 100%) were English (27.4%), Spanish (72.4%), Indo-European (0.2%), Asian and Pacific Islander (0.0%), and Other (0.0%).

The median age in the city was 33.6 years.

=== Racial and ethnic composition ===
Crystal City, Texas – racial and ethnic composition Note: the US Census treats Hispanic/Latino as an ethnic category. This table excludes Latinos from the racial categories and assigns them to a separate category. Hispanics/Latinos may be of any race.
Race / ethnicity (NH = non-Hispanic)	Pop. 1980	Pop. 1990	Pop. 2000	Pop. 2010	Pop. 2020
White alone (NH)	430 (5.16%)	289 (3.50%)	294 (4.09%)	169 (2.37%)	187 (2.94%)
Black or African American alone (NH)	25 (0.30%)	284 (3.44%)	35 (0.49%)	26 (0.36%)	51 (0.80%)
Native American or Alaska Native alone (NH)	0 (0.00%)	2 (0.02%)	10 (0.14%)	5 (0.07%)	16 (0.25%)
Asian alone (NH)	9 (0.11%)	0 (0.00%)	7 (0.10%)	1 (0.01%)	10 (0.16%)
Pacific Islander alone (NH)	—	—	1 (0.01%)	0 (0.00%)	0 (0.00%)
Other race alone (NH)	11 (0.13%)	45 (0.54%)	0 (0.00%)	1 (0.01%)	3 (0.05%)
Mixed race or multiracial (NH)	—	—	15 (0.21%)	6 (0.08%)	26 (0.41%)
Hispanic or Latino (any race)	7,859 (94.30%)	7,643 (92.50%)	6,828 (94.97%)	6,930 (97.09%)	6,061 (95.39%)
Total	8,334 (100.00%)	8,263 (100.00%)	7,190 (100.00%)	7,138 (100.00%)	6,354 (100.00%)

=== 2020 census ===
As of the 2020 census, there were 6,354 people, 2,211 households, and 1,534 families residing in the city. The population density was 1,732.28 inhabitants per square mile (668.8/km^{2}). There were 2,517 housing units at an average density of 686.21 per square mile (264.9/km^{2}).

The median age was 34.8 years. 29.1% of residents were under the age of 18 and 17.3% of residents were 65 years of age or older. For every 100 females there were 94.0 males, and for every 100 females age 18 and over there were 88.2 males age 18 and over.

There were 2,211 households in Crystal City, of which 37.8% had children under the age of 18 living in them. Of all households, 37.1% were married-couple households, 18.3% were households with a male householder and no spouse or partner present, and 37.4% were households with a female householder and no spouse or partner present. About 26.3% of all households were made up of individuals and 12.4% had someone living alone who was 65 years of age or older.

There were 2,517 housing units, of which 12.2% were vacant. The homeowner vacancy rate was 1.2% and the rental vacancy rate was 7.5%.

97.8% of residents lived in urban areas, while 2.2% lived in rural areas.

Racial composition as of the 2020 census
Race	Number	Percent
White	3,092	48.7%
Black or African American	69	1.1%
American Indian and Alaska Native	57	0.9%
Asian	10	0.2%
Native Hawaiian and Other Pacific Islander	0	0.0%
Some other race	1,157	18.2%
Two or more races	1,969	31.0%
Hispanic or Latino (of any race)	6,061	95.4%

=== 2010 census ===
As of the 2010 census, there were 7,138 people, 2,260 households, and 1,789 families residing in the city. The population density was 1,958.84 inhabitants per square mile (756.3/km^{2}). There were 2,557 housing units at an average density of 701.70 per square mile (270.9/km^{2}). The racial makeup of the city was 88.33% White, 0.84% African American, 0.35% Native American, 0.03% Asian, 0.10% Pacific Islander, 9.12% from some other races and 1.23% from two or more races. Hispanic or Latino people of any race were 97.09% of the population.

=== 2000 census ===
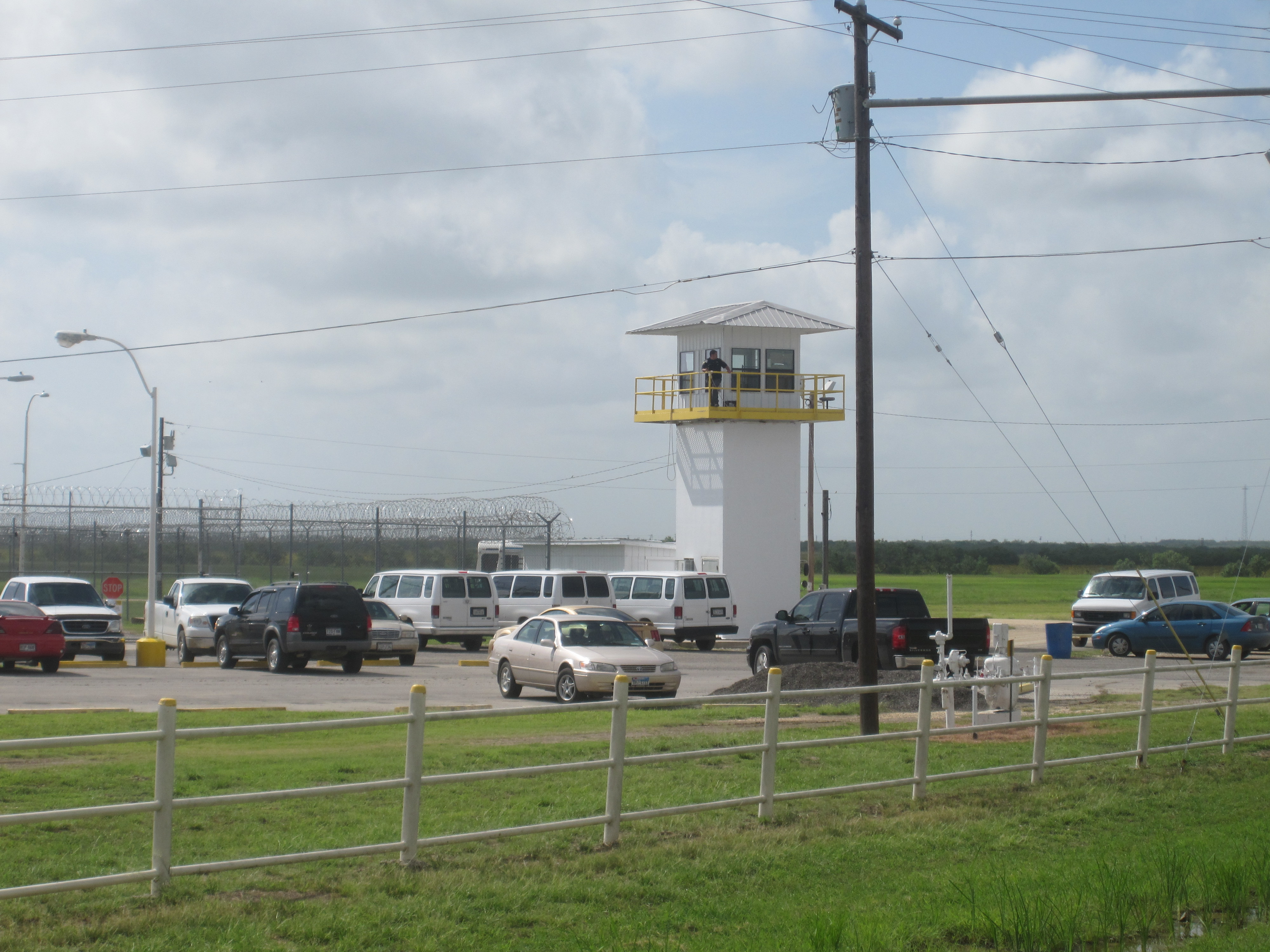
Crystal City Correctional Center

As of the 2000 census, there were 7,190 people, 2,183 households, and 1,781 families residing in the city. The population density was 1,974.0 inhabitants per square mile (762.2/km^{2}). There were 2,500 housing units at an average density of 686.0 per square mile (264.9/km^{2}). The racial makeup of the city was 67.96% White, 0.67% African American, 0.39% Native American, 0.10% Asian, 0.06% Pacific Islander, 28.33% from some other races and 2.50% from two or more races. Hispanic or Latino people of any race were 94.97% of the population.

There were 2,183 households, 43.2% had children under 18 living with them, 51.9% were married couples living together, 25.1% had a female householder with no husband present, and 18.4% were not families. About 16.9% of all households consisted of individuals; 9.7% had someone living alone who was 65 years of age or older. The average household size was 3.25 and the average family size was 3.67.

In the city, the population was distributed as 34.9% under the age of 18, 9.6% from 18 to 24, 24.2% from 25 to 44, 18.7% from 45 to 64, and 12.6% who were 65 years of age or older. The median age was 29 years. For every 100 females, there were 91.2 males. For every 100 females age 18 and over, there were 86.1 males.

The median income for a household in the city was $15,400, and for a family was $17,555. Males had a median income of $22,217 versus $14,591 for females. The per capita income for the city was $8,899. About 39.8% of families and 44.1% of the population were below the poverty line, including 51.3% of those under age 18 and 43.2% of those age 65 or over.

== Economy ==
The Crystal City Correctional Center, a private prison, was previously one of the largest employers in the Crystal City area when it housed prisoners from a variety of jurisdictions, including federal prisoners.

== Education ==
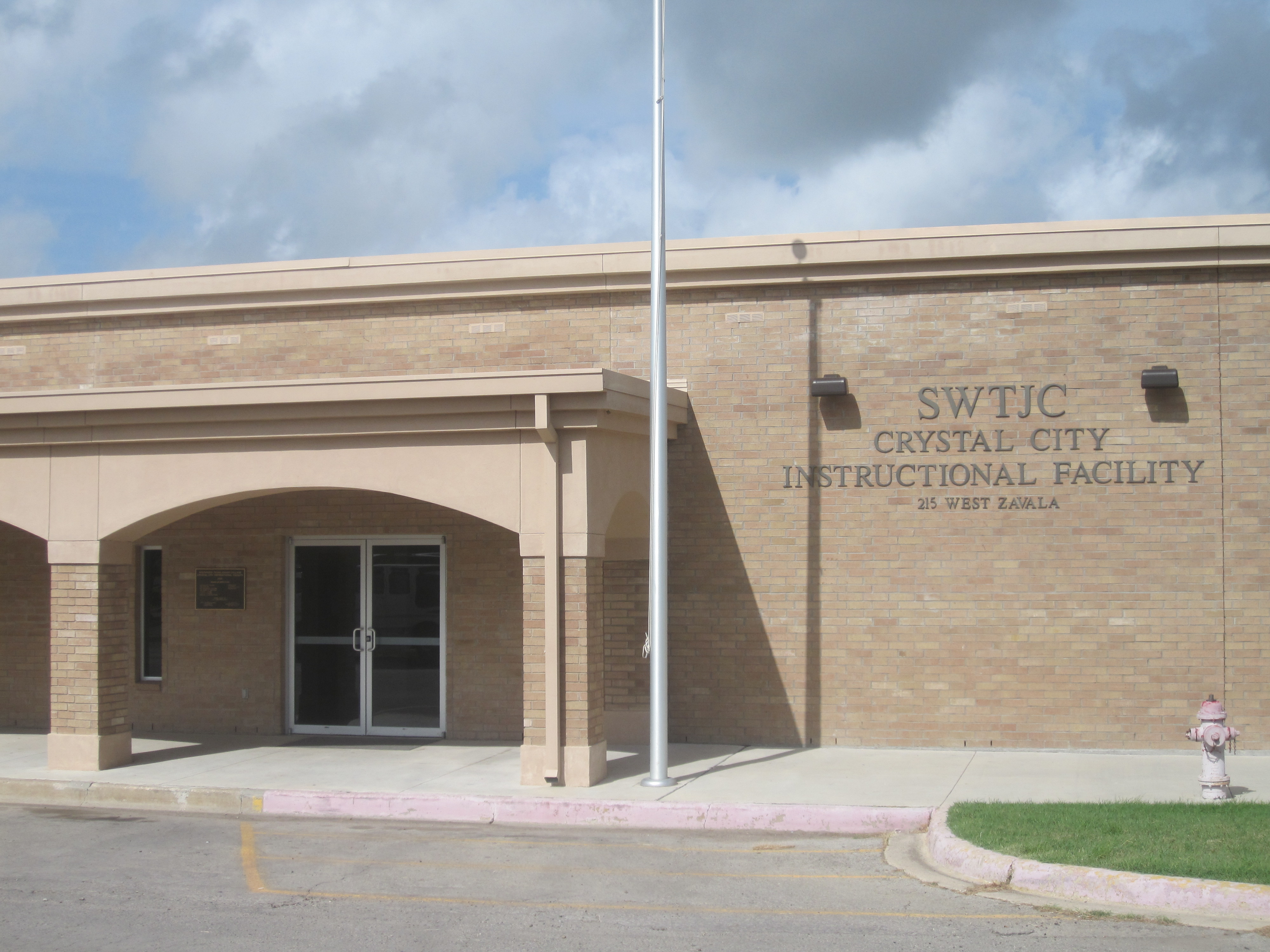
Southwest Texas Junior College branch in Crystal City

Crystal City is served by the Crystal City Independent School District. The high school teams are known as the Javelinas.

Also, the area has a branch of Southwest Texas Junior College; its main campus is to the north in Uvalde.

== Infrastructure ==
Crystal City is served by U.S. Route 83 and FM 65, FM 582, and FM 1433. Crystal City only has an airport for general aviation, Crystal City Municipal Airport.
