= La Pryor, Texas =

- Census-designated place
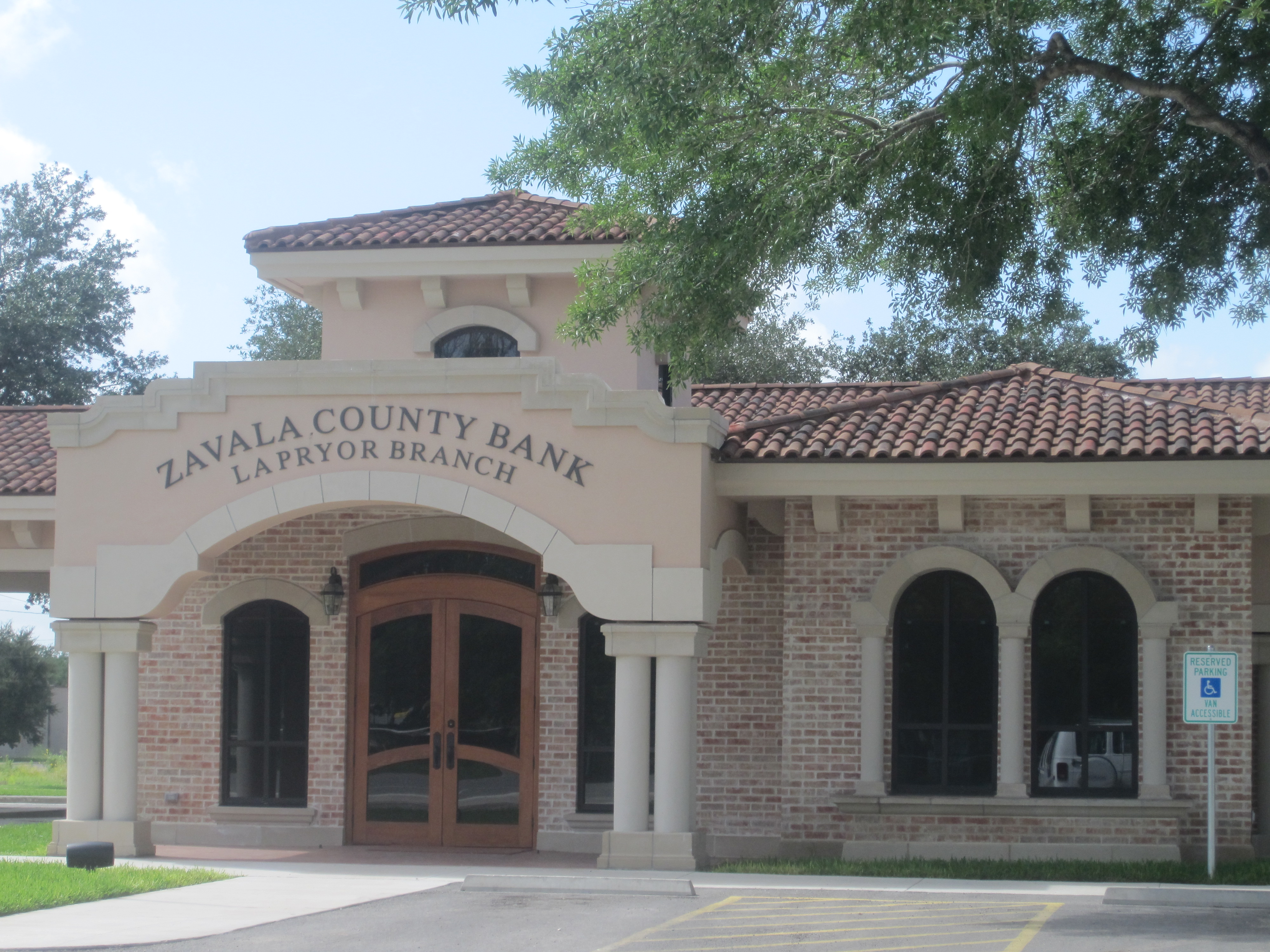
- Zavala County Bank in La Pryor, Texas

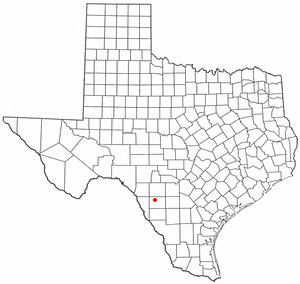
- Location of La Pryor, Texas

- Coordinates: 28°56′38″N 99°50′40″W
- Country: United States
- State: Texas
- County: Zavala

Area
  - Total: 2.7 sq mi (6.9 km^{2})
  - Land: 2.7 sq mi (6.9 km^{2})
  - Water: 0 sq mi (0.0 km^{2})
- Elevation: 745 ft (227 m)

Population (2020)
  - Total: 1,294
  - Density: 490/sq mi (190/km^{2})
- Time zone: UTC-6 (Central (CST))
  - Summer (DST): UTC-5 (CDT)
- ZIP code: 78872
- Area code: 830
- FIPS code: 48-41452
- GNIS feature ID: 1360810

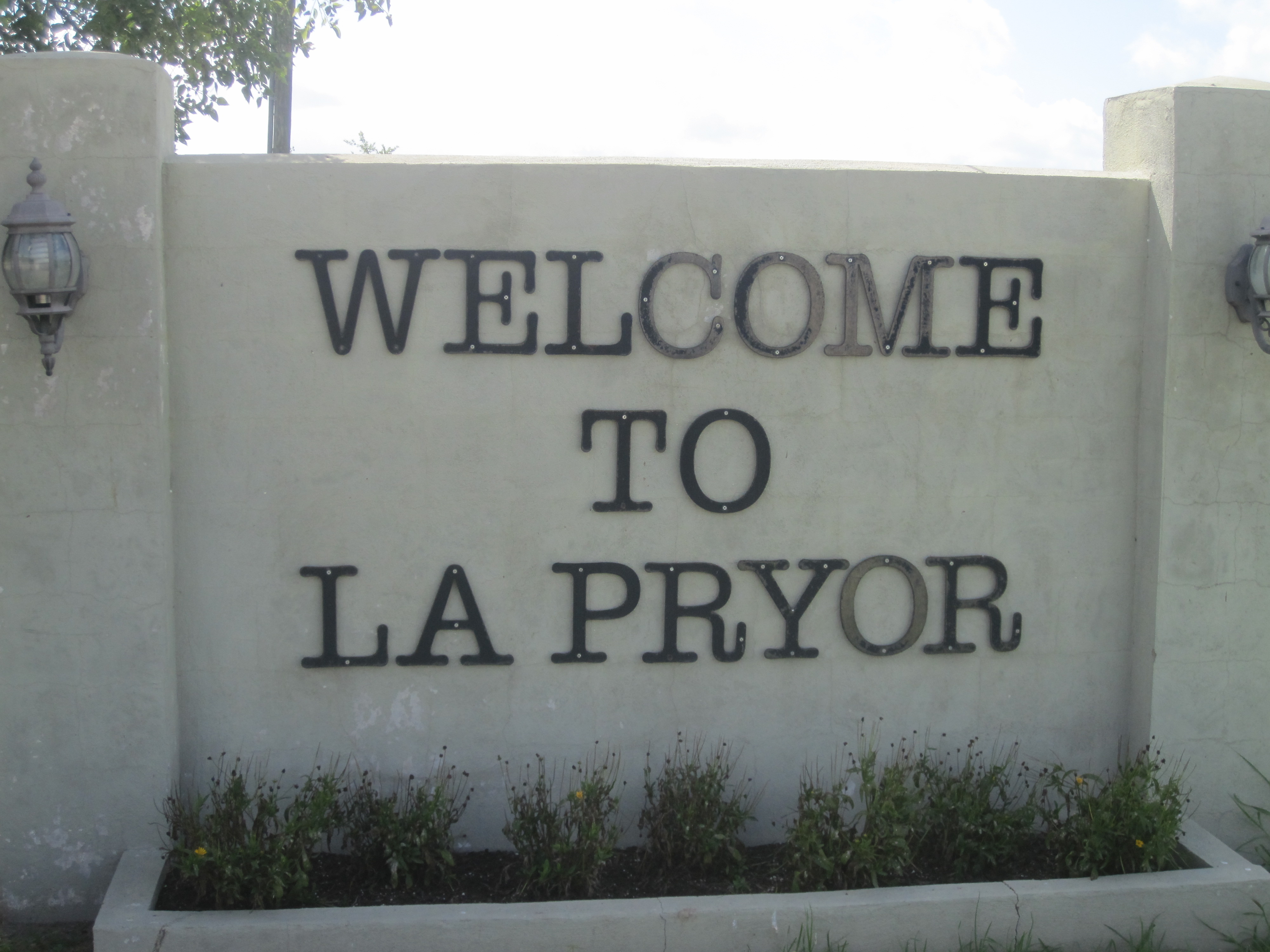
Welcome sign in La Pryor

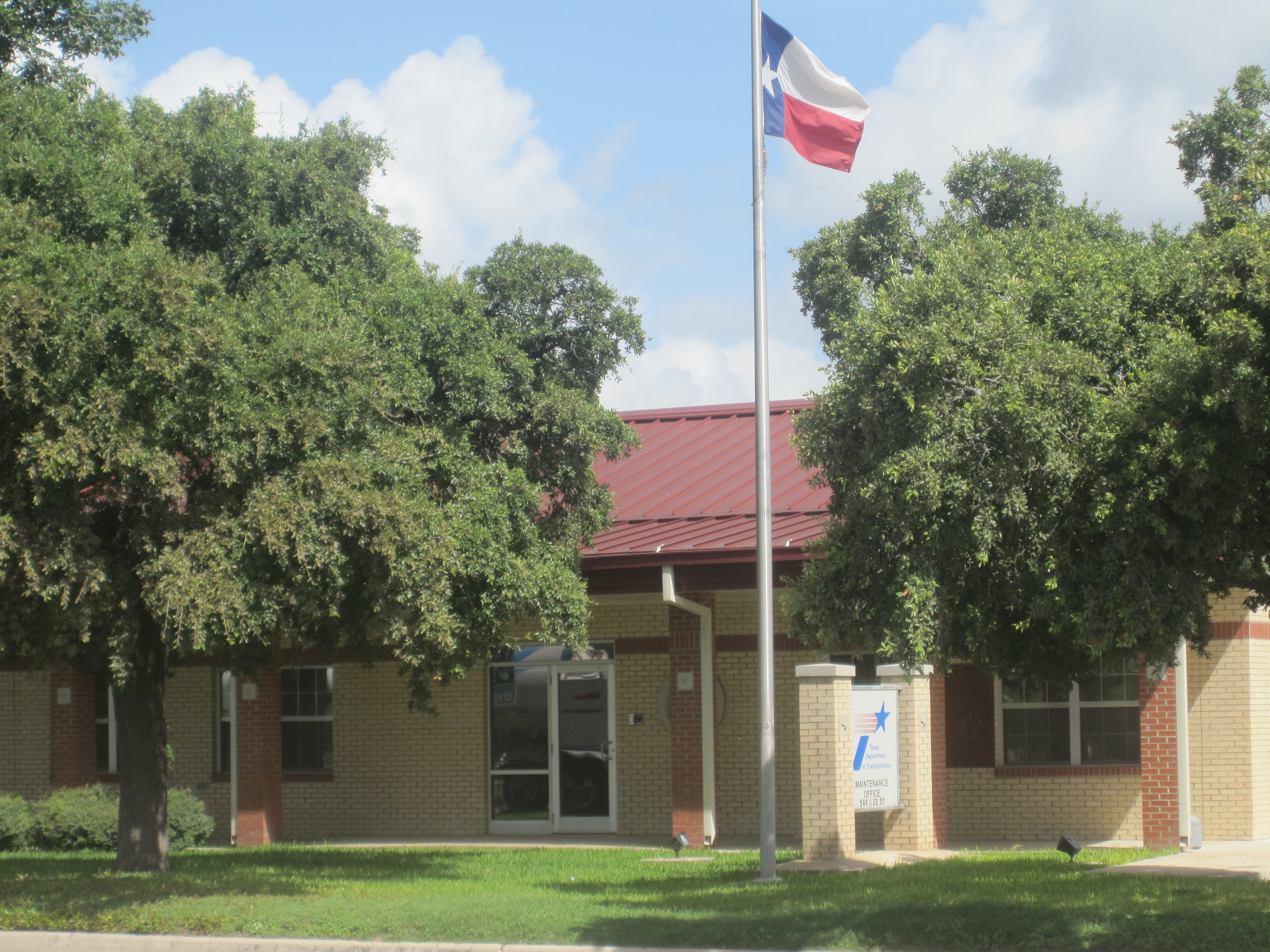
Texas Department of Transportation office in La Pryor

La Pryor (/lə ˈpraɪ.ər/ lə PRY-ər) is a census-designated place in Zavala County, Texas, United States. Its population was 1,294 at the 2020 census.

The town is named for Col. Isaac (Ike) T. Pryor, who in the 1880s owned a ranch that included the site of the community.

The Nueces River crosses U.S. Highway 83 north of La Pryor.

The community has within its limits branches of the Texas Department of Transportation and the Zavala County Bank.

== History ==
=== New World screwworm incident and resulting partial quarantine ===
On June 4, 2026, it was reported by the United States Department of Agriculture that a 3-week old calf had been infected with New World screwworm (Cochliomyia hominivorax), the first reported case in the United States in decades. All warm-blooded animals within a 12-mile radius are quarantined in an effort to stop the development of an epidemic hitting at a time of very low cattle production in the United States and higher prices.

== Geography ==
La Pryor is located at 28°56′38″N 99°50′40″W (28.943879, -99.844349).

According to the United States Census Bureau, the CDP has a total area of 2.7 square miles (6.9 km^{2}), all land.

== Demographics ==
Historical population
| Census | Pop. | Note | %± |
|---|---|---|---|
| 1980 | 1,257 | | — |
| 1990 | 1,343 | | 6.8% |
| 2000 | 1,491 | | 11.0% |
| 2010 | 1,643 | | 10.2% |
| 2020 | 1,294 | | −21.2% |
U.S. Decennial Census; 1850–1900 1910; 1920 1930 1940; 1950 1960 1970; 1980 1990 2000; 2010 2020

La Pryor first appeared as a census designated place in the 1980 United States census.

=== 2020 census ===
La Pryor CDP, Texas – Racial and ethnic composition Note: the US Census treats Hispanic/Latino as an ethnic category. This table excludes Latinos from the racial categories and assigns them to a separate category. Hispanics/Latinos may be of any race.
| Race / Ethnicity (NH = Non-Hispanic) | Pop 2000 | Pop 2010 | Pop 2020 | % 2000 | % 2010 | % 2020 |
|---|---|---|---|---|---|---|
| White alone (NH) | 166 | 138 | 92 | 11.13% | 8.40% | 7.11% |
| Black or African American alone (NH) | 1 | 6 | 9 | 0.07% | 0.37% | 0.70% |
| Native American or Alaska Native alone (NH) | 5 | 3 | 2 | 0.34% | 0.18% | 0.15% |
| Asian alone (NH) | 1 | 0 | 2 | 0.07% | 0.00% | 0.15% |
| Native Hawaiian or Pacific Islander alone (NH) | 0 | 3 | 0 | 0.00% | 0.18% | 0.00% |
| Other Race alone (NH) | 0 | 1 | 0 | 0.00% | 0.06% | 0.00% |
| Mixed race or Multiracial (NH) | 2 | 5 | 3 | 0.13% | 0.30% | 0.23% |
| Hispanic or Latino (any race) | 1,316 | 1,487 | 1,186 | 88.26% | 90.51% | 91.65% |
| Total | 1,491 | 1,643 | 1,294 | 100.00% | 100.00% | 100.00% |

As of the 2020 United States census, there were 1,294 people, 365 households, and 286 families residing in the CDP.

=== 2000 census ===
As of the census of 2000, 1,491 people, 462 households, and 368 families were residing in the CDP. The population density was 556.5 inhabitants per square mile (214.9/km^{2}). The 571 housing units averaged 213.1 per mi^{2} (82.3/km^{2}). The racial makeup of the CDP was 52.72% White, 0.07% African American, 0.47% Native American, 0.07% Asian, 43.46% from other races, and 3.22% from two or more races. Hispanics or Latinos of any race were 88.26% of the population.

Of the 462 households, 45.0% had children under the age of 18 living with them, 61.0% were married couples living together, 14.5% had a female householder with no husband present, and 20.3% were not families. About 19.3% of all households were made up of individuals, and 11.3% had someone living alone who was 65 years of age or older. The average household size was 3.23, and the average family size was 3.74.

In the CDP, the age distribution was 35.2% under 18, 9.6% from 18 to 24, 25.3% from 25 to 44, 20.3% from 45 to 64, and 9.7% who were 65 or older. The median age was 28 years. For every 100 females, there were 93.4 males. For every 100 females age 18 and over, there were 90.5 males.

The median income for a household in the CDP was $18,385, and for a family was $21,304. Males had a median income of $19,125 versus $15,125 for females. The per capita income for the CDP was $10,036. About 37.4% of families and 41.2% of the population were below the poverty line, including 48.8% of those under age 18 and 36.1% of those age 65 or over.

== Education ==
La Pryor is served by the La Pryor Independent School District.
