= Crystal City Independent School District =

School district in Texas, United States

Crystal City Independent School District is an American public school district based in Crystal City, Texas.

In addition to Crystal City, the district also serves the communities of Chula Vista, Amaya and Loma Grande. The school mascot is the peccary (officially the "Javelina").

== Schools ==
- Crystal City High School (Grades 9-12)
- Sterling Fly Junior High School (Grades 7-8)
- Benito Juarez Middle School (Grades 5-6)
- Lorenzo de Zavala Elementary School (Grades 2-4)
- Tomás Rivera Elementary School (Grades PK-1)
