= Bay View, Wisconsin =

Bay View is the name of some places in the US state of Wisconsin:

- Bay View, Kewaunee County, Wisconsin, an unincorporated community in Kewaunee County
- Bay View, Milwaukee, a neighborhood of Milwaukee

== See also ==
- Bayview, Wisconsin, a town
