= Zavala County, Texas =

County in Texas, United States

- County
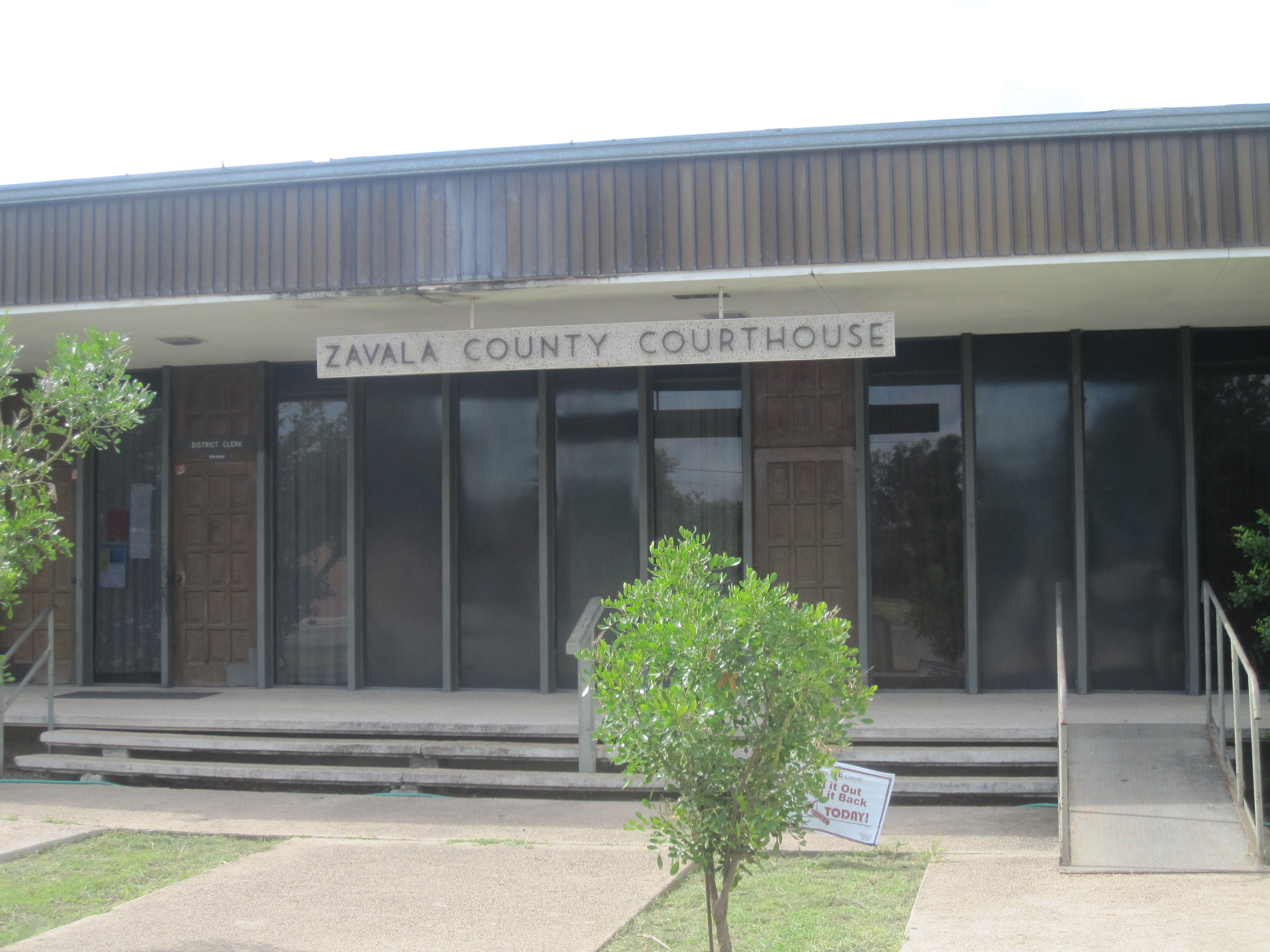
- The Zavala County Courthouse in Crystal City

- Location within the U.S. state of Texas
- Coordinates: 28.864652°N 99.75983°W
- Country: United States
- State: Texas
- Founded: February 1, 1858 (created); February 25, 1884 (organized)
- Named for: Lorenzo de Zavala
- Seat: Crystal City
- Largest city: Crystal City

Government
  - County judge: Jesse Gonzales

Area
  - Total: 1,301.735 sq mi (3,371.48 km^{2})
  - Land: 1,297.407 sq mi (3,360.27 km^{2})
  - Water: 4.328 sq mi (11.21 km^{2}) 0.33%

Population (2020)
  - Total: 9,670
  - Estimate (2025): 9,037 ▼
  - Density: 7.45/sq mi (2.88/km^{2})
- Time zone: UTC−6 (Central)
  - Summer (DST): UTC−5 (CDT)
- Area code: 830
- Congressional district: 23rd
- Website: www.co.zavala.tx.us

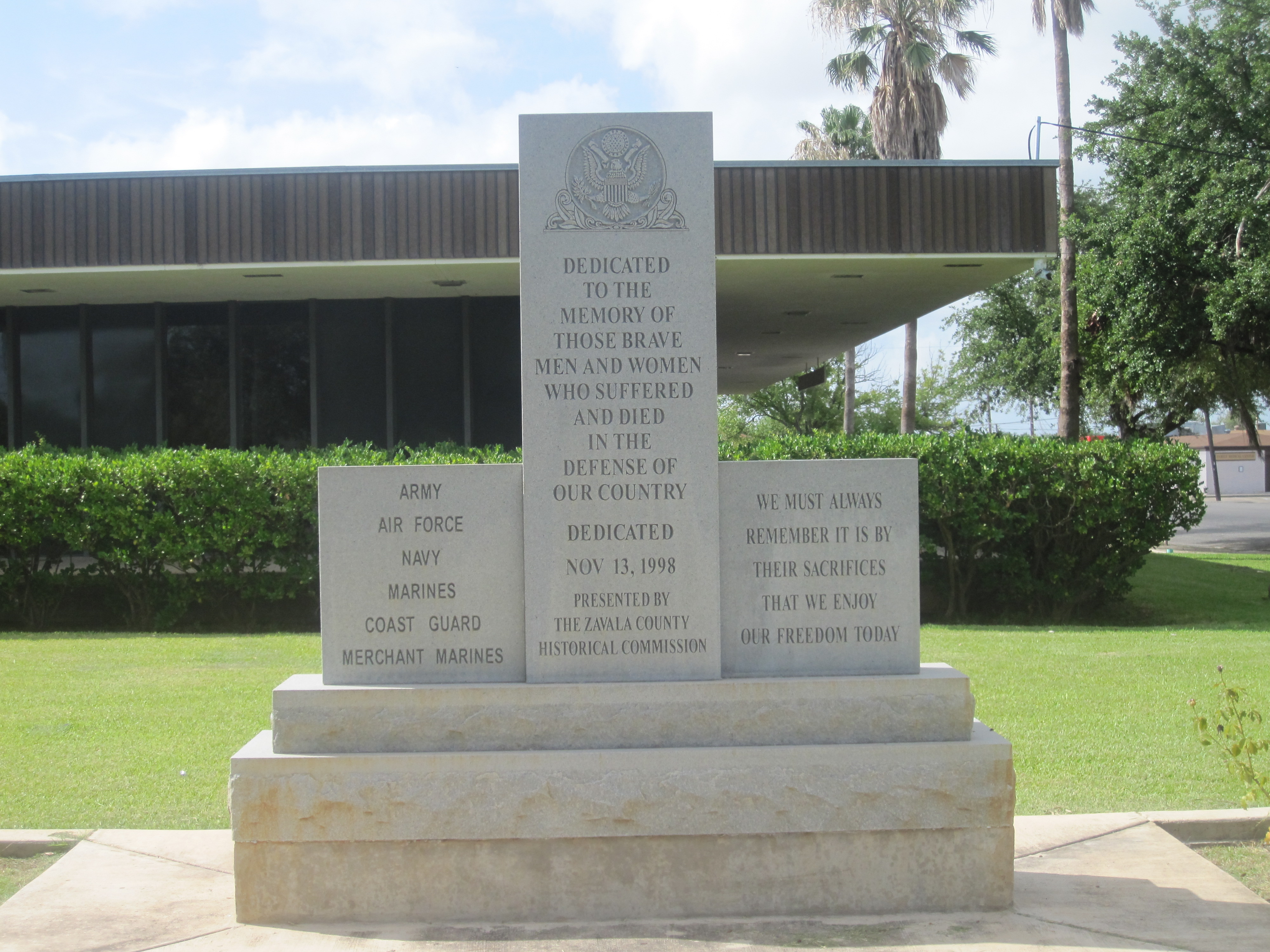
Veterans monument at Zavala County Courthouse grounds

Zavala County is a county in the U.S. state of Texas. As of the 2020 census, the population was 9,670, and was estimated to be 9,209 in 2024. The county seat and largest city is Crystal City.

== History ==
The county was created on February 1, 1858 and later organized on February 25, 1884. Zavala is named for Lorenzo de Zavala, Mexican politician, signer of the Texas Declaration of Independence, and first vice president of the Republic of Texas.

=== Native Americans ===
Radiocarbon assays indicate the county's Tortuga Flat Site was used in the 15th and 16th centuries by Pacuache. Archeologist T. C. Hill of Crystal City conducted excavations in 1972–1973 at the site, uncovering artifacts. More than 100 archeological sites have been identified by researchers of the University of Texas at San Antonio at the Chaparrosa Ranch. Coahuiltecan, Tonkawa, Lipan Apache and Mescalero Apache and Comanche have inhabited the area after the Pacuache. The last Indian raid in the county occurred in 1877 and involved Kickapoo Indians.

=== The Wild Horse Desert ===
The area between the Rio Grande and the Nueces River, which included Zavala County, became disputed territory known as the Wild Horse Desert, where neither the Republic of Texas nor the Mexican government had clear control. Ownership was in dispute until the Mexican–American War. The area became filled with lawless characters who deterred settlers in the area. An agreement signed between Mexico and the United States in the 1930s put the liability of payments to the descendants of the original land grants on Mexico. According to a list of Spanish and Mexican grants in Texas, Pedro Aguirre owned 51,296 acres in Zavala County, while Antonio Aguirre had 34,552. Seven other people (including two women — Juana Fuentes and Maria Escolastica Diaz) — each had 4,650 acres.

=== County established and growth ===
Zavala County was established in 1858 and named for Lorenzo de Zavala, a Mexican colonist and one of the signers of the Texas Declaration of Independence. The county was organized in 1858, with an error putting an additional “L” in the county. The mistake was not corrected until 1929. Batesville became the county seat. Crystal City won a 1928 election to become the new county seat. Grey (Doc) White and the Vivian family settled Cometa around 1867. They were joined by the Ramón Sánchez and Galván families in 1870 and by J. Fisher in 1871. Murlo community was settled about the same time. Ranching dominated the county originally, until overgrazing destroyed the grasslands. Zavala then became the first county in Texas to grow flax commercially. Ike T. La Pryor the largest ranch in the county and advertised the land for farming. The community that sprang up was named La Pryor. Developers E. J. Buckingham and Carl Groos purchased all 96,101 acres (388.91 km^{2}) of the Cross S Ranch in 1905, platted the town of Crystal City, and sold the rest as sections divided into 10-acre (40,000 m^{2}) farms.

=== Winter Garden ===
Zavala, Dimmit, Frio, and LaSalle Counties are considered the Winter Garden region of Texas. Irrigation and mild winter climate have made the area ideal for year-round vegetable farming. During the winter of 1917–18, spinach was introduced to Zavala. The first annual Spinach Festival was introduced in 1936, halted during World War II, but resumed in 1982. Cartoonist E. C. Segar, who created the spinach-eating Popeye, received a letter of appreciation from the Winter Garden Chamber of Commerce, thanking him for his support of spinach in the American diet. Segar's written response appeared in two newspapers exhorting children everywhere to enjoy Segar's favorite vegetable. He later approved a 1937 statue of Popeye to be erected in Crystal City, dedicated "To All The Children of the World". Bermuda onions became a major crop. Spinach, sorghum, and cotton were the three biggest crops. The principal crops grown in Zavala County in 1989 were spinach, cotton, pecans, corn, and onions.

=== Internment Camp ===
The Crystal City, Texas Family Internment Camp began as a migrant labor camp in the 1930s. By the time it closed, it had held German and Japanese combatants and their families, Latin Americans, and at least one Italian Latin American family, as well as German and Japanese American families. The 100 acres (0.40 km^{2}) were used for housing and security measures. An additional 190 acres (0.77 km^{2}) were for farming and personnel residences. The first internees of German ethnicity, arrived on December 12, 1942, and were expected to work on construction, being paid 10 cents an hour. A 70-bed hospital was built in 1943, as was a school for children of the internees. Internees ran nursery schools and kindergartens. From its inception through June 30, 1945, the Crystal City camp held 4,751 internees and had 153 births. The camp closed in 1948.

=== Latino Americans ===
The Mexican Revolution that began in 1910 resulted in thousands of laborers flowing across the border to cultivate vegetable crops. By 1917 and 1918, Pancho Villa was sending banditos across the Rio Grande. Crystal City organized home guards for protection against Villa's associates. By 1930, Crystal City was overwhelmingly composed of Latino Americans. That year, Zavala County had the highest percentage of laborers (1,430 per 100 farms) and the lowest percentage of tenants (33 per 100 farms) of all counties in South Texas. Owner-operators were primarily non-Hispanic white, whereas sharecroppers and farm laborers were Latino. By the late 1950s, a majority of those graduating from high school in the county were Latino American. In 1990, 89.4% of the county population of 12,162 was Hispanic.

=== Tejano politics ===
Juan Cornejo of the Teamsters Union and the Political Association of Spanish-Speaking Organizations organized the Latino population among cannery workers and farm laborers of Crystal City in 1962–63 and succeeded in electing an all-Latino city council. The feat became known as the Crystal City Revolts. The Raza Unida Party was established in 1970 in Crystal City and Zavala County to bring greater self-determination among Tejanos.

== Geography ==
According to the United States Census Bureau, the county has a total area of 1,301.735 square miles (3,371.48 km^{2}), of which 1,297.407 square miles (3,360.27 km^{2}) is land and 4.328 square miles (11.21 km^{2}) (0.33%) is water. It is the 32nd largest county in Texas by total area.

=== Major highways ===
- U.S. Highway 57
- U.S. Highway 83
- Loop 155
- Loop 305

=== Adjacent counties ===
- Uvalde County (north)
- Frio County (east)
- Dimmit County (south)
- Maverick County (west)
- La Salle County (southeast)

== Demographics ==
Historical population
Census	Pop.	Note	%±
1860	26		—
1870	138		430.8%
1880	410		197.1%
1890	1,097		167.6%
1900	792		−27.8%
1910	1,889		138.5%
1920	3,108		64.5%
1930	10,349		233.0%
1940	11,603		12.1%
1950	11,201		−3.5%
1960	12,696		13.3%
1970	11,370		−10.4%
1980	11,666		2.6%
1990	12,162		4.3%
2000	11,600		−4.6%
2010	11,677		0.7%
2020	9,670		−17.2%
2025 (est.)	9,037	▼	−6.5%
U.S. Decennial Census; 1790–1960 1900–1990; 1990–2000 2010–2020

=== Housing market ===
As of the second quarter of 2025, the median home value in Zavala County was $97,657.

=== American Community Survey ===
As of the 2023 American Community Survey, there are 3,411 estimated households in Zavala County with an average of 2.78 persons per household. The county has a median household income of $41,887. Approximately 36.3% of the county's population lives at or below the poverty line. Zavala County has an estimated 50.6% employment rate, with 9.6% of the population holding a bachelor's degree or higher and 73.4% holding a high school diploma.

There were 3,951 housing units at an average density of 0.0 per square mile (0.0/km^{2}).

The top five reported languages (people were allowed to report up to two ancestries, thus the figures will generally add to more than 100%) were English (27.8%), Spanish (72.1%), Indo-European (0.1%), Asian and Pacific Islander (0.0%), and Other (0.0%).

=== 2020 census ===
As of the 2020 census, the county had a population of 9,670. The median age was 35.4 years, 28.4% of residents were under the age of 18 and 17.3% of residents were 65 years of age or older. For every 100 females there were 94.3 males, and for every 100 females age 18 and over there were 88.9 males age 18 and over.

As of the 2020 census, the racial makeup of the county was 47.5% White, 0.9% Black or African American, 0.8% American Indian and Alaska Native, 0.2% Asian, <0.1% Native Hawaiian and Pacific Islander, 16.2% from some other race, and 34.4% from two or more races. Hispanic or Latino residents of any race comprised 92.5% of the population.

As of the 2020 census, 69.4% of residents lived in urban areas, while 30.6% lived in rural areas.

As of the 2020 census, there were 3,355 households in the county, including 2,391 families; 38.1% had children under the age of 18 living in them. Of all households, 40.4% were married-couple households, 18.0% were households with a male householder and no spouse or partner present, and 35.1% were households with a female householder and no spouse or partner present. About 24.4% of all households were made up of individuals and 12.0% had someone living alone who was 65 years of age or older.

As of the 2020 census, there were 3,920 housing units, of which 14.4% were vacant. Among occupied housing units, 70.3% were owner-occupied and 29.7% were renter-occupied. The homeowner vacancy rate was 1.4% and the rental vacancy rate was 8.6%.

=== Racial and ethnic composition ===
Zavala County, Texas – racial and ethnic composition Note: the US Census treats Hispanic/Latino as an ethnic category. This table excludes Latinos from the racial categories and assigns them to a separate category. Hispanics/Latinos may be of any race.
Race / ethnicity (NH = non-Hispanic)	Pop. 1980	Pop. 1990	Pop. 2000	Pop. 2010	Pop. 2020
White alone (NH)	1,246 (10.68%)	954 (7.84%)	924 (7.97%)	647 (5.54%)	572 (5.92%)
Black or African American alone (NH)	19 (0.16%)	284 (2.34%)	43 (0.37%)	35 (0.30%)	67 (0.69%)
Native American or Alaska Native alone (NH)	9 (0.08%)	3 (0.02%)	17 (0.15%)	9 (0.08%)	21 (0.22%)
Asian alone (NH)	3 (0.03%)	0 (0.00%)	8 (0.07%)	3 (0.03%)	19 (0.20%)
Pacific Islander alone (NH)	—	—	1 (0.01%)	3 (0.03%)	1 (0.01%)
Other race alone (NH)	3 (0.03%)	46 (0.38%)	1 (0.01%)	3 (0.03%)	3 (0.03%)
Mixed race or multiracial (NH)	—	—	24 (0.21%)	16 (0.14%)	43 (0.44%)
Hispanic or Latino (any race)	10,386 (89.03%)	10,875 (89.42%)	10,582 (91.22%)	10,961 (93.87%)	8,944 (92.49%)
Total	11,666 (100.00%)	12,162 (100.00%)	11,600 (100.00%)	11,677 (100.00%)	9,670 (100.00%)

=== 2010 census ===
As of the 2010 census, there were 11,677 people, 3,573 households, and _ families residing in the county. The population density was 0.0 inhabitants per square mile (0.0/km^{2}). There were 4,283 housing units at an average density of 0.0 per square mile (0.0/km^{2}). The racial makeup of the county was 88.22% White, 0.76% African American, 0.35% Native American, 0.03% Asian, 0.14% Pacific Islander, 9.09% from some other races and 1.40% from two or more races. Hispanic or Latino people of any race were 93.87% of the population.

=== 2000 census ===
As of the 2000 census, there were 11,600 people, 3,428 households, and 2,807 families residing in the county. The population density was 9.0 inhabitants per square mile (3.5/km^{2}). There were 4,075 housing units at an average density of 3.0 per square mile (1.2/km^{2}). The racial makeup of the county was 65.06% White, 0.49% African American, 0.59% Native American, 0.09% Asian, 0.03% Pacific Islander, 31.08% from some other races and 2.66% from two or more races. Hispanic or Latino people of any race were 91.22% of the population.

There were 3,428 households, which 43.80% had children under the age of 18 living with them, 55.10% are married couples living together, 21.80% had a female householder with no husband present, and 18.10% were non-families. About 16.60% of all households are made up of individuals, and 9.10% had someone living alone who is 65 years of age or older. The average household size is 3.28 and the average family size is 3.70.

In the county, the population was distributed as 34.10% under the age of 18, 10.20% from 18 to 24, 25.60% from 25 to 44, 18.70% from 45 to 64, and 11.30% who were 65 years of age or older. The median age is 29 years. For every 100 females there are 97.50 males. For every 100 females age 18 and over, there are 95.80 males.

The median income for a household in the county was $16,844, and for a family is $19,418. Males had a median income of $22,045 versus $14,416 for females. The per capita income for the county is $10,034. About 37.40% of families and 41.80% of the population were below the poverty line, including 48.90% were under the age of 18 and 42.40% are 65 or older.

== Communities ==
=== City ===
- Crystal City (county seat)

=== Census-designated places ===
- Amaya
- Batesville
- Chula Vista
- La Pryor
- Loma Grande

== Politics ==
Zavala County, like most of southern Texas, is heavily Democratic. It had given the Democratic presidential candidate over 60% of the vote in every election since 1976, even in 2020, when Democratic support in southern Texas receded. In 2024, Democrats won under 60% of the vote for the first time since Richard Nixon's 1972 landslide. Overall, Zavala County shifted to the right from 2012 to 2024 by 53 percentage points, representing one of the strongest such rightward shifts for any county in the country.

United States presidential election results for Zavala County, Texas
Year	Republican		Democratic		Third party(ies)	
Year	No.	%	No.	%	No.	%
1912	44	10.68%	242	58.74%	126	30.58%
1916	43	14.78%	229	78.69%	19	6.53%
1920	101	25.57%	264	66.84%	30	7.59%
1924	95	20.97%	326	71.96%	32	7.06%
1928	571	71.38%	229	28.63%	0	0.00%
1932	166	17.42%	783	82.16%	4	0.42%
1936	209	20.86%	788	78.64%	5	0.50%
1940	259	25.95%	739	74.05%	0	0.00%
1944	342	30.29%	696	61.65%	91	8.06%
1948	306	31.03%	618	62.68%	62	6.29%
1952	1,043	60.53%	677	39.29%	3	0.17%
1956	896	62.79%	528	37.00%	3	0.21%
1960	761	51.59%	706	47.86%	8	0.54%
1964	598	25.07%	1,784	74.80%	3	0.13%
1968	693	31.29%	1,307	59.01%	215	9.71%
1972	1,288	52.96%	1,122	46.13%	22	0.90%
1976	735	28.51%	1,822	70.67%	21	0.81%
1980	831	23.49%	2,621	74.08%	86	2.43%
1984	924	23.89%	2,937	75.93%	7	0.18%
1988	628	15.81%	3,338	84.02%	7	0.18%
1992	571	14.76%	3,058	79.06%	239	6.18%
1996	463	14.50%	2,629	82.34%	101	3.16%
2000	751	22.15%	2,616	77.15%	24	0.71%
2004	777	24.92%	2,332	74.79%	9	0.29%
2008	596	15.38%	3,263	84.18%	17	0.44%
2012	574	15.71%	3,042	83.27%	37	1.01%
2016	694	20.44%	2,636	77.62%	66	1.94%
2020	1,490	34.00%	2,864	65.36%	28	0.64%
2024	1,482	42.44%	1,984	56.82%	26	0.74%

United States Senate election results for Zavala County, Texas1
Year	Republican		Democratic		Third party(ies)	
Year	No.	%	No.	%	No.	%
2024	1,167	35.66%	1,994	60.92%	112	3.42%

United States Senate election results for Zavala County, Texas2
Year	Republican		Democratic		Third party(ies)	
Year	No.	%	No.	%	No.	%
2020	1,232	30.85%	2,633	65.92%	129	3.23%

Texas Gubernatorial election results for Zavala County
Year	Republican		Democratic		Third party(ies)	
Year	No.	%	No.	%	No.	%
2022	780	31.84%	1,642	67.02%	28	1.14%

== Education ==
School districts include:

- Crystal City Independent School District
- La Pryor Independent School District
- Uvalde Consolidated Independent School District

Southwest Texas Junior College is the county's designated community college.

== See also ==
- Winter Garden Region
