= Loma Grande, Texas =

Amaya, Texas
- CDP
- Interactive map of Amaya, Texas
- Coordinates: 28°43′20″N 99°49′58″W
- Country: United States
- State: Texas
- County: Zavala

Area
  - Total: 0.1 sq mi (0.26 km^{2})
  - Land: 0.1 sq mi (0.26 km^{2})
  - Water: 0.0 sq mi (0 km^{2})

Population (2010)
  - Total: 107
  - Density: 1,100/sq mi (410/km^{2})
- Time zone: UTC-6 (Central (CST))
  - Summer (DST): UTC-5 (CDT)
- Zip Code: 78839
- FIPS code: 4843458

Loma Grande is a census-designated place (CDP) in Zavala County, Texas, United States. It was a new CDP formed from parts of the former Las Colonias CDP prior to the 2010 census. As of the 2020 census, Loma Grande had a population of 135.

== Geography ==
Loma Grande is located at 28°43′20″N 99°49′58″W (28.722077, -99.832709). The CDP has a total area of 0.1 square miles (0.26 km^{2}), all land.

== Demographics ==
Historical population
Census	Pop.	Note	%±
2010	107		—
2020	135		26.2%
U.S. Decennial Census; 1850–1900 1910; 1920 1930 1940; 1950 1960 1970; 1980 1990 2000; 2010 2020

Loma Grande first appeared as a census designated place prior to 2010 U.S. census, one of two CDPs (Amaya, Loma Grande) formed out of the deleted Las Colonias CDP.

=== 2020 census ===
Loma Grande CDP, Texas – Racial and ethnic composition Note: the US Census treats Hispanic/Latino as an ethnic category. This table excludes Latinos from the racial categories and assigns them to a separate category. Hispanics/Latinos may be of any race.
Race / Ethnicity (NH = Non-Hispanic)	Pop 2010	Pop 2020	% 2010	% 2020
White alone (NH)	0	3	0.00%	2.22%
Black or African American alone (NH)	0	0	0.00%	0.00%
Native American or Alaska Native alone (NH)	0	3	0.00%	2.22%
Asian alone (NH)	0	2	0.00%	1.48%
Native Hawaiian or Pacific Islander alone (NH)	0	0	0.00%	0.00%
Other race alone (NH)	0	0	0.00%	0.00%
Mixed race or Multiracial (NH)	0	0	0.00%	0.00%
Hispanic or Latino (any race)	107	127	100.00%	94.07%
Total	107	135	0.00%	0.00%
