= Carmen Roybal Arteaga =

Chicana educator and activist in Pueblo, Colorado

- Born: Pueblo, Colorado, U.S.
- Occupations: Educator, author, Escuela Huitzhualopan Principal
- Spouse: Martín Serna

Carmen Roybal Arteaga is a Pueblo-based activist for Chicano education and historical research. She has been an advocate for bilingual and bicultural education in Pueblo schools to meet the needs of the large Chicano population. She was also known as Carmen Serna when she was married to activist Martín Serna.

== Biography ==
Carmen Royobal was born in Pueblo, Colorado to parents Victor and Bea Roybal. Their family was deeply involved in the Chicano Movement in Pueblo, as part of La Raza Unida and many other community-based organizations. Her mother Bea Roybal was one of the original Las Madres de la Casa Verde and chairwoman of the group. Her brother Edmond Roybal was a member of the Pueblo Brown Berets.

She attended Southern Colorado State College for two years, and graduated from Adams State College with a Bachelor of Arts in Elementary Education. She attended the University of Northern Colorado for her Master of Arts degree in Exceptional Student Services.

She volunteered with the Latin American Developmental Society to teach Chicano studies to prison inmates and tutored at La Casa Verde on the weekends.

In 1971, she moved back to Pueblo and worked in school district 60 at Risley Middle School.

=== Activism ===
While at Adams State College, Arteaga was part of the farmworker boycotts led by Cesar Chavez. She also participated in the 100 Mile March from Pueblo to Denver to support the farmworkers.

Arteaga inaugurated the "Crecer" evening tutorial program in 1971 out of La Casa Verde. This course focused on reading and writing, as well as cultural education. Arteaga wrote a proposal to St. Leander's Parish Council for permission to use the old church building to house Escuela Huitzhualopan.

Escuela Huitzhualopan offered classes with cultural understanding of the Chicano community, which was something they did not get in the traditional public school system. The program was organized by Martín Serna, and Arteaga was the director. Arteaga was instrumental in developing additional programs for the school, including Youth Tutoring Youth, a performance group called Ballet Folklorico de Escuela Huitzhualopan, and a preschool program. The school encouraged parent and family involvement, and worked with the Southern Colorado Mental Health Institute to counsel students. The contract to use the church building expired and was denied for 1972-73.

In the 1972-73 school year, Arteaga received backlash from her fellow teachers in District 60 when she refused to stand for the Pledge of Allegiance. She took issue with the statement "with liberty and justice for all," since it did not ring true for people of color. District administrators applied pressure to reverse her stance, but the Chicano community rallied around her.

Arteaga was a member of the Chicano Barrio Education Committee, which created a list of recommendations for curriculum and personnel in District 60 and asked for clarification on all plans from the superintendent. The school board approved action in 1974 that included Chicano Studies I and II classes that Arteaga taught.

She has been part of the East Side Commission and the Lower East Side Neighborhood Association. In 1995, they planned a mural called "El Vaquero" on Joplin Ave, and they established a mural project at Plaza Verde Park. The East Side Commission has sponsored the city's Cinco de Mayo festivities in the past, and Arteaga has been part of the planning committee.

Arteaga is chairperson of two organizations, Las Comrades and Fray Angelico Chavez Chapter of Genealogical Society of Hispanic America. In 2016, Las Comadres donated a rose garden memorial in honor of the La Casa Verde Mothers and the neighborhood. A historical marker bench was installed with nine rose bushes during the dedication ceremony.

Arteaga has spent most of her teaching career at Risley Middle School.

In 2022, Arteaga received a research grant from the CSU Pueblo Aztlán Center to research ten of Pueblo's Chicano murals.

=== Personal life ===
Arteaga's first husband was Martín Serna.

She later married Silvestre Arteaga and has two daughters, Beatriz and Celestina.

== Recognition ==
Arteaga was recognized as an outstanding educator for the 2007-2008 school year by the Pueblo Hispanic Education Foundation.

In 2019, Arteaga was included in the Pueblo History Museum's "Year of La Chicana" tapestry.

== See also ==
- El Movimiento
- Chicana feminism
- Los Seis de Boulder
- Salad Bowl strike
