= Plaza Verde Park =

Municipal park in Pueblo, Colorado

Coordinates: 38.2664372667°N 104.596176107°W

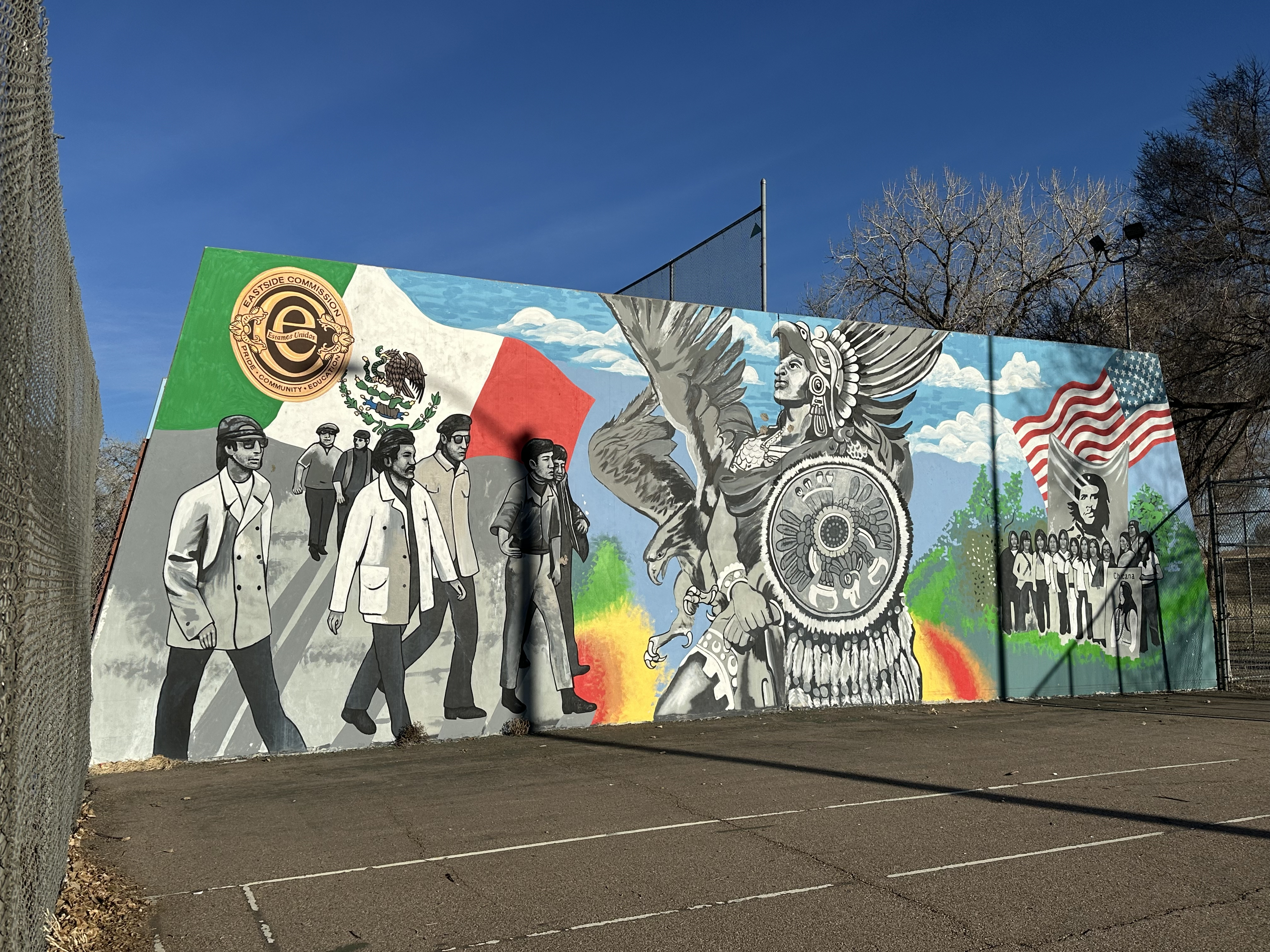
Plaza Verde mural

Plaza Verde Park is a park established in 1972 in Pueblo, Colorado.

It is managed by the Pueblo Department of Parks and Recreation. The park is a popular site for celebrations like Cinco de Mayo and gatherings for the Latino community in Pueblo.

== Mothers of Casa Verde ==
In 1968, a group of mothers on the lower east side of Pueblo recognized a lack of recreation areas for their children. These organizers became known as Las Madres de la Casa Verde and created a grassroots community center at 519 Joplin Ave.

In 1965, parts of Pueblo were devastated by the 1965 flood. In 1972, the group worked with Pueblo Parks and Recreation to develop a park in the damaged area.

The Mothers and La Raza Unida co-director Martín Serna gathered over 3000 signatures on a petition from members of the neighborhood who complained about the lack of facilities for the youth. After the death of 14-year-old Rudy Maestas, Serna organized a protest rally that blamed city officials for criminal negligence. The city manager blamed federal bureaucracy for the delay in building the park, but eventually they used city money to build it.

== Community support ==
Groups like La Raza Unida and La Gente originally supported the organization's efforts and developed the first mural in the park, which began a tradition of mural painting in the park. The Eastside Commission hired artist Anthony Armijo to paint murals depicting the history of the lower eastisde neighborhood.

In 2013, the local Native American community adopted the park and sponsored Earth Day cleanups and mural paintings. A mural of nine roses represents the original nine founding Mothers of Las Casa Verde.

In 2016, Las Comadres, including Bea Roybal's daughter Carmen Roybal Arteaga, donated a rose garden memorial in honor of the La Casa Verde Mothers and the neighborhood. A historical marker bench was installed with nine rose bushes during the dedication ceremony.

== Murals ==
One of the best known murals in the park is an untitled mural by artist Leo Lucero, painted in 1978. Lucero and other artists asked city officials permission to paint the mural, but were rebuffed. Lucero ignored the orders and painted a Chicano flag on a concrete wall. The mural was loved by the community, who came together to protect it from being destroyed by the city.

The mural was inaugurated on July 2, 1978, with entertainment, stalls, and food. Community members expressed concern that the city council would paint over the mural since it wasn't officially sanctioned. The artist said, "Murals are done for the people that want them, not for those who don’t. They can go around killing Chicanos when they want to, painting a mural won’t do anything."

The mural remained undamaged for 14 years. In 1992, Lucero was contacted by the head of the parks and recreation department to repaint the mural, as it had been damaged by graffiti.

In 2022, Lucha Martinez de Luna organized a preservation project to protect Colorado's Chicano murals, including Lucero's mural. The mural has been refurbished with multiple artists working to preserve the artwork. Martinez de Luna is working to have these murals designated as historical landmarks.

== Park features ==
- Bike trail
- Picnic areas
- Playground
- Restrooms
- Tables
- Tennis courts
- Trail access
