= Ramsey Muñiz =

American political activist (1942–2022)

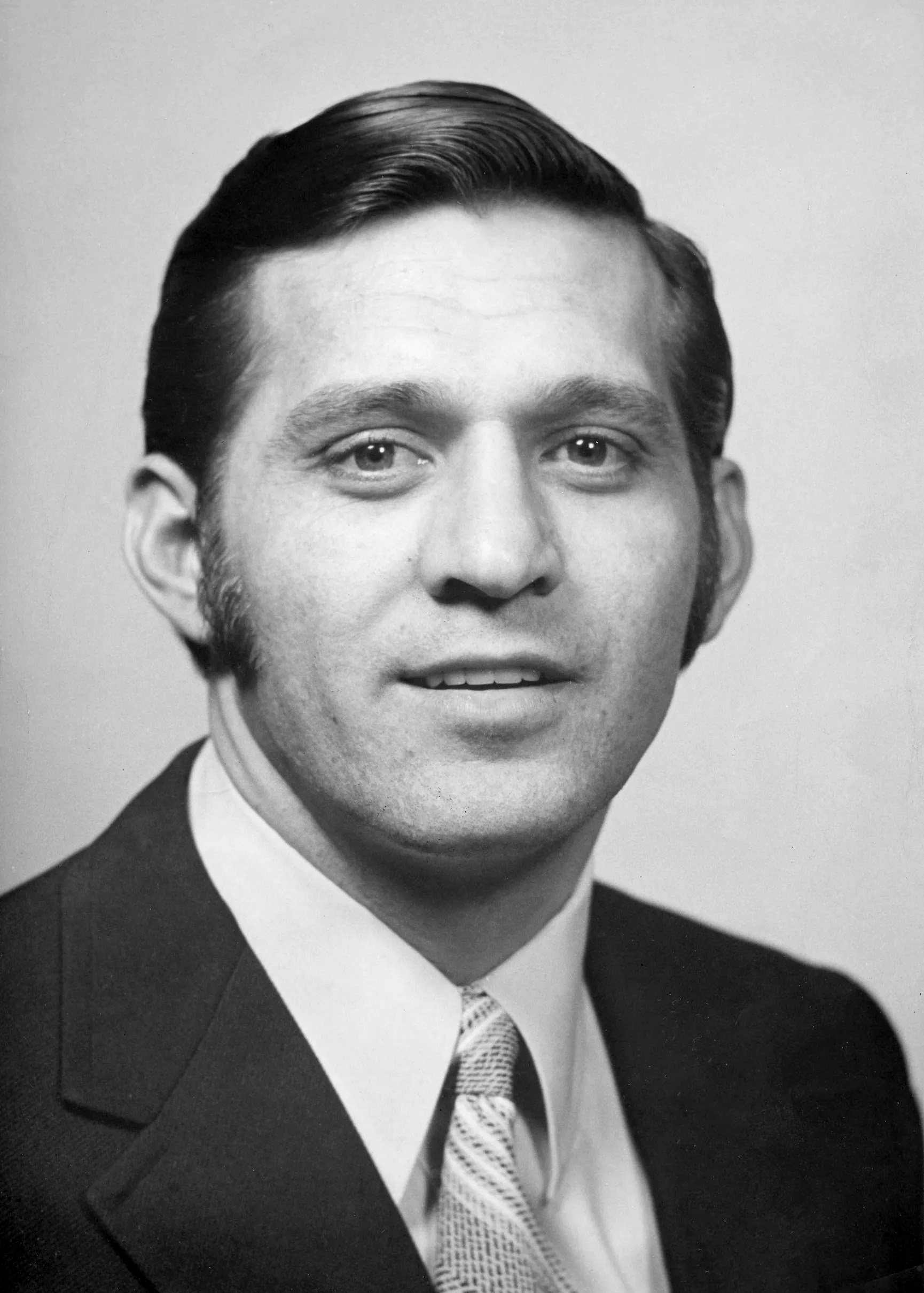
- Muñiz c. 1972
- Born: Ramiro Muñiz; December 13, 1942; Corpus Christi, Texas, U.S.
- Died: October 2, 2022 (aged 79); Corpus Christi, Texas, U.S.
- Education: Baylor University; Baylor University Law School
- Occupation: Lawyer (disbarred)
- Political party: Mexican American Youth Organization (1969); Raza Unida Party (1972)
- Spouse: Irma L. Muñiz

Ramiro Muñiz, known as Ramsey Muñiz (December 13, 1942 – October 2, 2022), was an American political activist. Muñiz was a Mexican American who ran for governor of Texas in 1972 and 1974, each time as the nominee of the Raza Unida Party. He lost both elections to the Democrat Dolph Briscoe, a wealthy banker and landowner from Uvalde, Texas. He is the first Hispanic whose name appeared on a Texas gubernatorial general election ballot.

== Background ==
Muñiz was born in Corpus Christi, Texas, one of five children of Rudy G. and Hilda (née Longoria) Muñiz. To help his financially struggling family, he took many jobs while he was a boy. He wrote:

"During the summer my mother would be up by 3 a.m. preparing breakfast and lunch for us, as we would depart from the house at 5:00 and arrive at the cotton field by 6 a.m. She would pick cotton with us. I can still see her face sweating and pulling the 12-foot cotton sack. When it was time to eat lunch, we would all gather under the cotton trailer as she would distribute the food she had prepared. Thereafter, we had half an hour to rest or nap because by 1:00 PM we hit the field once more until 4:30. Even as I share these historical memories, I can envision her face, which is full of love, pride, strength, faith, and a 'never give up' attitude like no one else in this world. By the time I was fourteen years old, Bobby and I could pick 1,000 pounds a day. I would not even take the time to eat. I wanted my mother to be proud of me. That's how much love I have for my mother."

== Education and career ==
Even in junior high school, Muñiz worked to procure equal representation for minorities on the student council at Miller High School in Corpus Christi. A football player, he once organized a protest by the athletic team on behalf of the first African American seeking to join the cheerleading squad.

Muñiz obtained a scholarship to attend Baylor University in Waco, Texas, where he obtained in 1967 his Bachelor of Science degree. In 1971, he procured his Juris Doctor degree from Baylor Law School, having worked as an assistant coach to help finance his studies. While in law school, Muñiz joined the newly established Mexican American Youth Organization, a politically active organization known as MAYO, which held its only convention in 1969.

While living in Waco, Muñiz spent years with his mentor and friend, William V. Dunnam Jr., with whom he later worked as an attorney. Muñiz subsequently relocated to San Antonio, where he continued his law practice with Sandoval and Peña. He then worked with attorneys Albert Huerta and Albert Peña in Corpus Christi.

== Political activism ==
Muñiz lectured at colleges and universities, including Texas A&M University - Kingsville, then known as Texas A&I, Harvard University, the University of California at Berkeley, and the University of Michigan. Other such university speakers in his day were the clergymen Billy Graham, Jesse Jackson, and Ralph Abernathy, the Hispanic activist Cesar Chavez, American Indian Movement figure Russell Means, Georgia State Representative Julian Bond, and the black communist Angela Davis. In addressing his audiences, Muñiz issued a call for political, social, and spiritual consciousness.

While still twenty-nine and working as an attorney for the Model Cities program in Waco, Muñiz ran as the La Raza gubernatorial candidate after several better known names in the Hispanic community, such as then State Representative Carlos Truan of Corpus Christi, declined to seek the state's highest office. Though the minimum age is thirty to become governor of Texas, Muñiz would have reached that age in time for the 1973 inauguration had he been elected. His campaign focused primarily on issues of importance to Hispanics, as espoused at the first Raza Unida convention held earlier that year in El Paso. Muñiz had a female running mate for lieutenant governor, Alma Canales of Edinburg, who had been a farmworker and journalism student at the University of Texas - Pan American. At twenty-four, Canales did not meet the age qualification for the office but ran to emphasize women's issues. She was defeated by the Democratic nominee Bill Hobby of Houston who won the first of five terms (the first for two years) in the state's second ranking constitutional office.

Muñiz ran in the general election against the victorious Democrat Dolph Briscoe and the Republican Henry C. Grover, a departing state senator from Houston, who trailed Briscoe by some 100,000 votes, or half the number of votes that Muñiz received. Though he polled only 214,118 votes (6 percent) in the election, Muñiz said that his campaign benefited Mexican Americans by offering a consistent political voice. However, most liberals did not support Muñiz. Even liberal activist Frances Farenthold of Corpus Christi, who had lost the Democratic runoff election to Dolph Briscoe, endorsed her party nominees.

Muñiz ran again for governor in 1974 and polled fewer votes but about the same overall percent as he had received in 1972. He hence lost again to Briscoe, who carried all but seven counties in his race against the Republican nominee, Jim Granberry, a former mayor of Lubbock, who carried the backing of U.S. Senator John G. Tower. In that election, Briscoe won the first four-year term for governor in Texas since 1873, when Democrat Richard Coke unseated Republican Edmund J. Davis.

== Incarceration ==
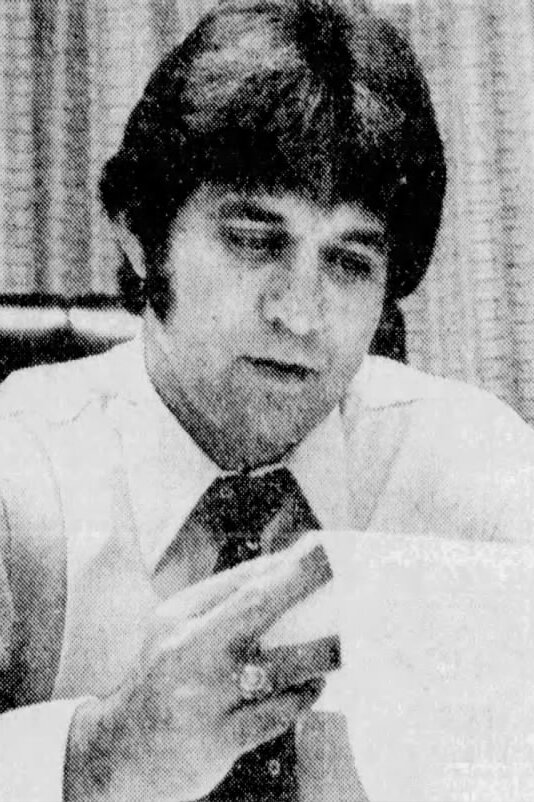
Muñiz in 1976

In 1976, the U.S. government brought felony drug charges against Muñiz for allegedly attempting to smuggle 6,500 pounds of marijuana into the U.S. from Mexico. He pleaded guilty to one count and served five years in a federal penitentiary. This effectively killed the Raza Unida Party. Its 1978 gubernatorial candidate, Mario Cura Compean, polled only 14,213 (barely one-half of 1 percent), as Republican Bill Clements became his state's first Republican governor in 105 years.

After his release, Muñiz worked as a legal assistant to several attorneys. In 1982, he pled no contest to a possession of cocaine charge and served two years. In 1994, he was arrested by the Drug Enforcement Administration in a rental car with 90 pounds of cocaine. He was serving a life sentence at the United States Penitentiary, Leavenworth, Kansas, without the possibility of parole.

Muñiz considered himself a political prisoner incarcerated on false charges. He maintained a website asking interested persons to petition former U.S. President Barack H. Obama for his freedom.

Ramsey was released on compassionate grounds under federal supervision on December 10, 2018. He died on October 2, 2022, from complications of myasthenia gravis.
