= Albert Gurule =

Chicano activist from Pueblo, Colorado

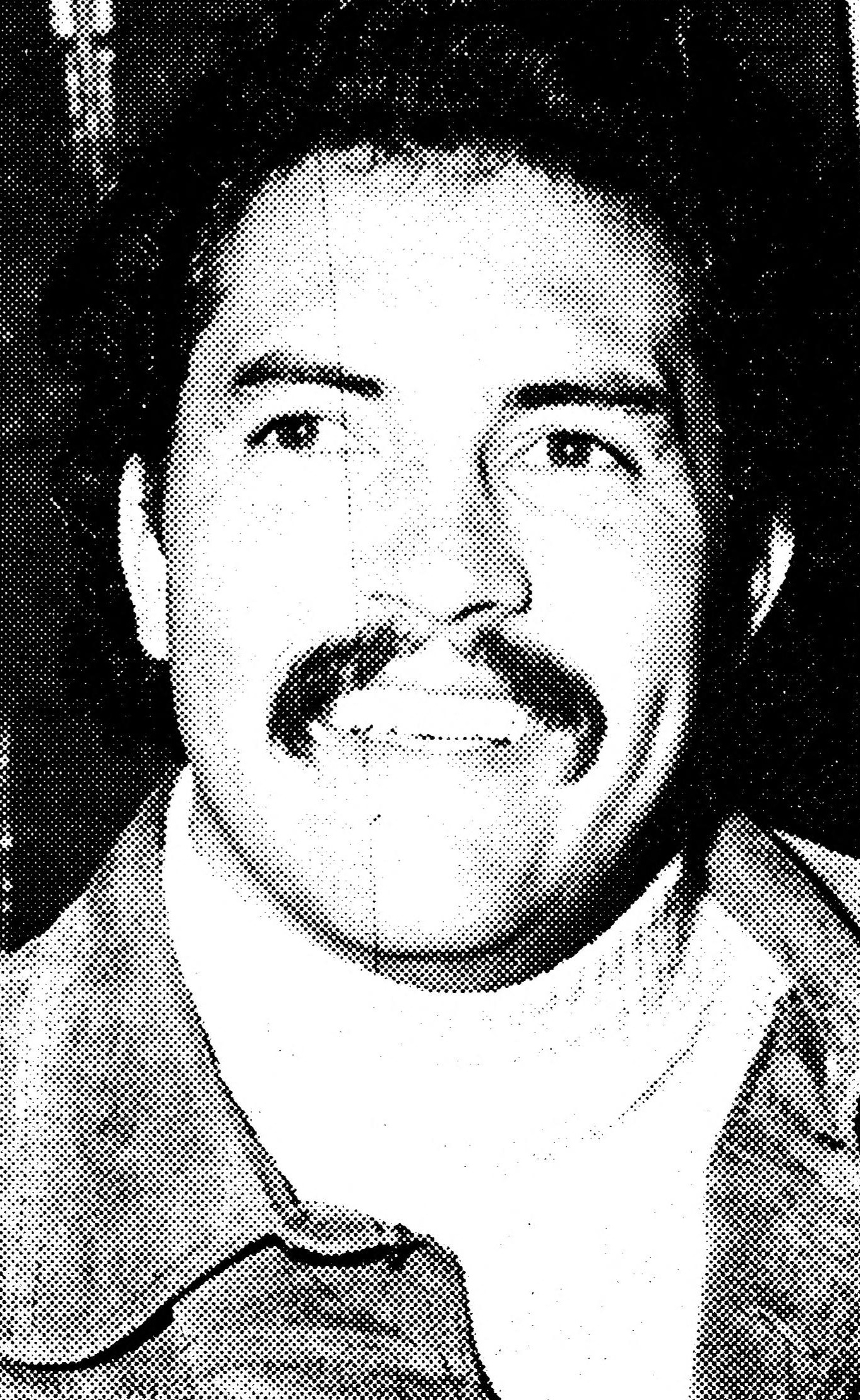
Gurule c. 1970

Albert Gurule (born c. 1944) is a Chicano activist from Pueblo, Colorado. He was part of La Raza Unida Party and ran for Colorado governor in 1970.

== Biography ==
Gurule grew up in Trinidad, Colorado, where he was the fifth of seven children. His father was Euberto Gurule.

By the age of nine, Gurule was working ten hours a day in the potato fields. He experienced discrimination for speaking Spanish and coming from poverty.

Gurule met his wife Theresa at The Strand, a movie theatre where they both worked. They had 2 sons together. Theresa Gurule died of cancer in 1995.

He received his AA degree from Trinidad State College, and BS from Southern Colorado State College (now Colorado State University Pueblo).

Gurule has always been involved in public service. He worked for the Pueblo County Welfare Department as a caseworker. Gurule earned a master's degree in social work from the University of Denver in 1968, and he returned to Pueblo as a social worker.

== Early activism ==
Gurule was inspired by the assassination of Martin Luther King Jr. in 1968 to join social justice organizations. That year, Gurule picketed at the Colorado State Capitol. He organized a student rally to demand the Colorado General Assembly call a special session to review racial problems.

Gurule recognized the importance of student involvement in the national civil rights movements happening at the time. He helped sponsor a new club, Movimiento Estudiantil Chicano de Aztlan (MECHA) at Southern Colorado State College.

Gurule and Martín Serna became close through their leadership roles in Chicano causes in Pueblo. Serna became Gurule's "chief lieutenant."

In 1969, Gurule organized a coalition of Chicanos to picket Safeway in support of Cesar Chavez and his cause. After this success, Gurule and MECHA focused on Coors beer for its racist hiring policies. They chose Southern Colorado State College and the student pub where Coors was served. During the demonstration, 15 demonstrators including Gurule were arrested. Gurule received an additional charge of inducing minors to riot, and the long-drawn out trial damaged his image for being a brash radical upsetting the status quo.

Gurule's coworkers at Pueblo County Welfare rescinded their support, and employees voted to veto further support for him. He resigned, and moved on to the Social Services of Pueblo United.

Gurule was involved with La Casa Verde on the east side of Pueblo. He worked with youth who created their own Black Beret creed, which brought down even more criticism upon Gurule. He resigned from his role as Developer of Minority Goals with Pueblo's United Fund because of the uproar.

During the lettuce workers strike march from Pueblo to Denver, Gurule joined to march for part of the way. He was also part of the National Grape Boycott.

In 1970, Gurule and other Chicano leaders from Colorado traveled to Los Angeles for the Chicano Moratorium. Gurule was charged with carrying a concealed weapon. The charges were eventually dropped.

Gurule received retaliation for his involvement with activist issues. He organized a recall of District Attorney Joe Losavio, and in 1977 one of Losavio's investigators attempted to plant heroin in Gurule's car.

Gurule became the owner of Community Corrections Services in 1988, which ran a halfway house for state prisoners.

== Political campaigns ==
Rodolfo "Corky" Gonzales recruited Gurule to start La Raza Unida in Colorado.

Gurule ran for Colorado Governor in 1970 with the Raza Unida Party. The Colorado Democratic Party tried to have Gurule and all Raza Unida candidates disqualified; Gurule was only 27 and the minimum age to become governor was 30.

In 1971, LRU held the national conference in Pueblo, CO. Gurule and Martin Serna were keynote speakers.

They began La Raza Unida Service Agency in 1971, which incorporated elected officials into the community as a gathering place.

In the 1980's and 90's, Gurule focused on local issues in Pueblo rather than state-wide or national. In 1994, Gurule was appointed then elected to Pueblo city council district 2. In 1996, he ran for Congress as a Democrat against incumbent Republican Scott McInnis, and lost.

Gurule was later elected to the Pueblo city council, and was its president for one year.

== See also ==
- Chicano
- El Movimiento
- Hispanics and Latinos in Colorado
- Las Madres de la Casa Verde
- Raza Unida Party
- Rodolfo Gonzales
