= 1978 Texas gubernatorial election =

- November 7, 1978
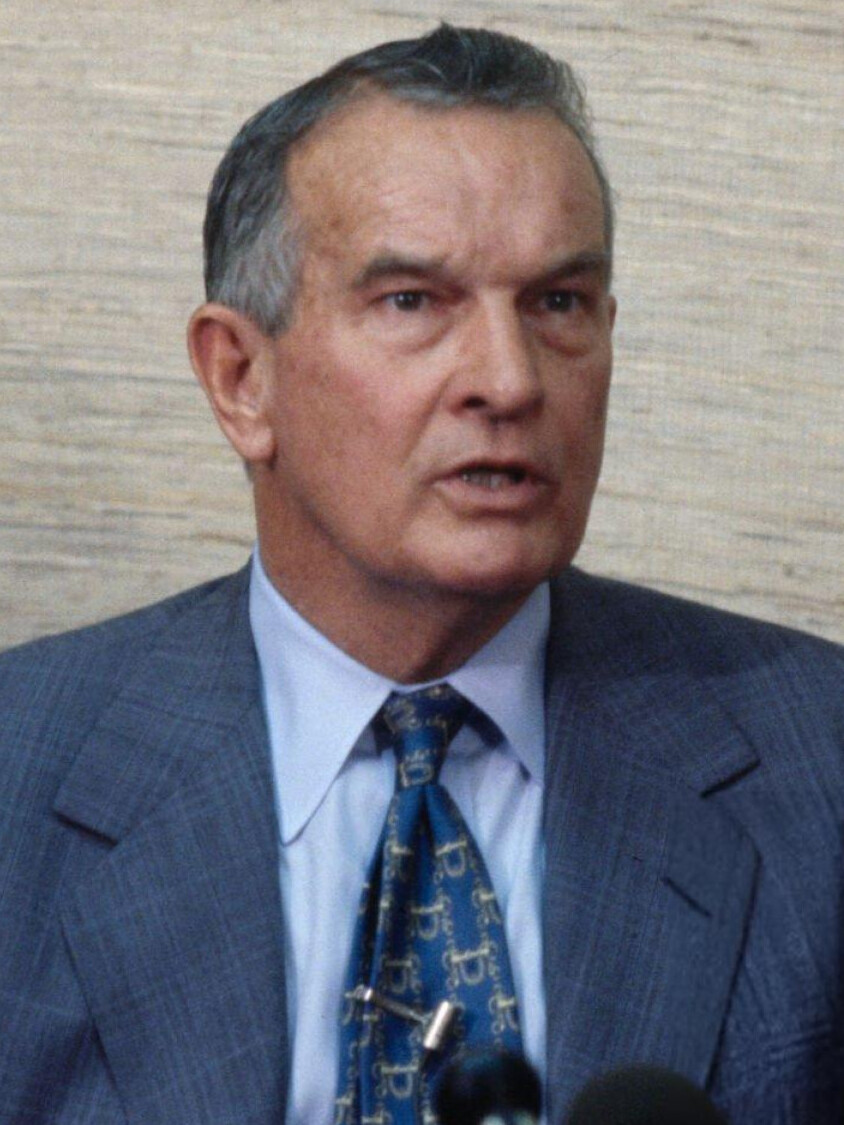

Nominee	Bill Clements	John Hill
Party	Republican	Democratic
Popular vote	1,183,828	1,166,919
Percentage	49.96%	49.24%
- County results Clements: 40–50% 50–60% 60–70% 70–80% Hill: 40–50% 50–60% 60–70% 70–80% 80–90% Compeán: 50–60%
Governor before election
Dolph Briscoe
Democratic
Elected Governor
Bill Clements
Republican

The 1978 Texas gubernatorial election was held on November 7, 1978, to elect the governor of Texas. In a surprising upset, Republican Bill Clements was narrowly elected over Democratic State Attorney General John Hill, winning about 50% of the vote to Hill's 49.2%. In doing so, Clements became the first Republican to be elected governor since Reconstruction in 1869.

Besides Clements' upset victory in the gubernatorial election, Republican Senator John Tower was re-elected to a third full six-year term in the Texas U.S. Senate race. However, the majority of the down-ballot statewide offices remained with the Democratic Party. With a margin of victory of just 0.72%, this was the closest race of the 1978 gubernatorial cycle.

== Democratic primary ==
Dolph Briscoe, who had first been elected in 1972 and was easily re-elected in 1974, had become increasingly unpopular within the Texas Democratic Party during his six years in office. John Luke Hill fielded a primary challenge against the Governor, as a liberal alternative to Briscoe, who represented the more conservative, rural faction of the party. Dissatisfaction with Briscoe prompted former Governor Preston Smith to enter the race, running as a populist alternative to the other two candidates. Briscoe had previously defeated Smith in the 1972 primary.

Hill defeated Briscoe outright by a margin of 10.1 percentage points, with Smith earning just 5% of the vote. This marks the most recent time in Texas that the incumbent governor has failed to receive the nomination of their party while running for reelection.

=== Candidates ===
==== Declared ====
- Dolph Briscoe, incumbent Governor
- John Hill, Attorney General of Texas
- Preston Smith, former Governor

=== Results ===
Primary results by county Hill: 40–50%; 50–60%; 60–70%; Briscoe: 40–50%; 50–60%; 60–70%; 80–90%

Democratic primary results
Party	Candidate	Votes	%
Democratic	John Hill	932,245	52.44%
Democratic	Dolph Briscoe (incumbent)	753,309	42.37%
Democratic	Preston Smith	92,202	5.19%
Total votes		1,777,756	100

== Republican primary ==
=== Candidates ===
==== Declared ====
- Bill Clements, businessman and former Deputy U.S. Secretary of Defense
- Ray Hutchison, attorney, former State Representative and husband of Kay Bailey Hutchison
- Clarence Thompson

==== Withdrew ====
- James M. Collins, U.S. Representative from Dallas (endorsed Clements)

=== Results ===
Republican primary results
Party	Candidate	Votes	%
Republican	Bill Clements	115,345	72.82
Republican	Ray Hutchison	38,268	24.16
Republican	Clarence Thompson	4,790	3.02
Total votes		158,403	100.00

== General election ==
=== Results ===
General election results
Party	Candidate	Votes	%
Republican	Bill Clements	1,183,828	49.96%
Democratic	John Hill	1,166,919	49.24%
Raza Unida	Mario C. Compeán	14,213	0.59%
Socialist Workers	Sara Johnston	4,624	0.19%
Total votes		2,369,999	100.00%
Republican gain from Democratic			

== Videos ==
(1) Bill Clements bio

(2) Gubernatorial Debate on October 24, 1978 at KPRC-TV Studios in Houston

(3) Republican Primary Gubernatorial Debate in 1978

(4) Gubernatorial Debate on October 27, 1978 at KERA-TV Studios in Dallas
