= 1978 United States House of Representatives elections in Texas =

- November 7, 1978

All 24 Texas seats to the United States House of Representatives
	Majority party	Minority party
Party	Democratic	Republican
Last election	22	2
Seats won	20	4
Seat change	▼2	▲2
Popular vote	1,285,348	889,450
Percentage	58.9%	40.7%
Swing	▼5.8%	▲5.8%
Democratic
50–60%
60–70%
70–80%
80–90%
90>%
Republican
50–60%
80–90%
90>%

The 1978 United States House of Representatives elections in Texas occurred on November 7, 1978, to elect the members of the state of Texas's delegation to the United States House of Representatives. Texas had twenty-four seats in the House apportioned according to the 1970 United States census.

These elections occurred simultaneously with the United States Senate elections of 1978, the United States House elections in other states, and various state and local elections.

Democrats maintained their majority of U.S. House seats from Texas, but they lost two seats to the Republicans, decreasing their majority to twenty out of twenty-four seats. These elections produced a high level of turnover due to the retirements of several representatives, as well as the electoral defeat of others.

== Overview ==
1978 United States House of Representatives elections in Texas
Party	Votes	Percentage	Seats before	Seats after	+/–
Democratic	1,285,348	58.90%	22	20	-2
Republican	888,215	40.70%	2	4	+2
La Raza Unida	7,185	0.33%	0	0	-
Socialist Workers	1,632	0.07%	0	0	-
Totals	2,182,380	100.00%	24	24	-

== Congressional districts ==
=== District 1 ===
Incumbent Democrat Sam B. Hall ran for re-election.

Texas's 1st congressional district, 1978
Party	Candidate	Votes	%
Democratic	Sam B. Hall (incumbent)	73,708	78.07
Republican	Fred Hudson	20,700	21.92
Total votes		94,408	100
Democratic hold			

=== District 2 ===
Incumbent Democrat Charlie Wilson ran for re-election.

Texas's 2nd congressional district, 1978
Party	Candidate	Votes	%
Democratic	Charlie Wilson (incumbent)	66,986	70.09
Republican	James Dillion	28,584	29.91
Total votes		95,570	100
Democratic hold			

=== District 3 ===
Incumbent Republican James M. Collins ran for re-election unopposed.

Texas's 3rd congressional district, 1978
Party	Candidate	Votes	%
Republican	James M. Collins (incumbent)	96,406	100.00
Total votes		96,406	100
Republican hold			

=== District 4 ===
Incumbent Democrat Ray Roberts ran for re-election.

Texas's 4th congressional district, 1978
Party	Candidate	Votes	%
Democratic	Ray Roberts (incumbent)	58,336	61.46
Republican	Frank Glenn	36,582	38.54
Total votes		94,918	100
Democratic hold			

=== District 5 ===
Incumbent Democrat Jim Mattox ran for re-election.

Texas's 5th congressional district, 1978
Party	Candidate	Votes	%
Democratic	Jim Mattox (incumbent)	35,524	50.32
Republican	Thomas W. Pauken	34,672	49.12
Socialist Workers	James White	397	0.56
Total votes		70,593	100
Democratic hold			

=== District 6 ===
Incumbent Democrat Olin E. Teague opted to retire rather than run for re-election.

Texas's 6th congressional district, 1978
Party	Candidate	Votes	%
Democratic	Phil Gramm	66,025	65.10
Republican	Wes Mowery	35,393	34.90
Total votes		101,418	100
Democratic hold			

=== District 7 ===
Incumbent Republican Bill Archer ran for re-election.

Texas's 7th congressional district, 1978
Party	Candidate	Votes	%
Republican	Bill Archer (incumbent)	128,214	85.24
Democratic	Robert Hutchings	22,415	14.90
Total votes		150,418	100
Republican hold			

=== District 8 ===
Incumbent Democrat Bob Eckhardt ran for re-election.

Texas's 8th congressional district, 1978
Party	Candidate	Votes	%
Democratic	Bob Eckhardt (incumbent)	39,429	61.51
Republican	Nick Gearhardt	24,673	38.49
Total votes		64,102	100
Democratic hold			

=== District 9 ===
Incumbent Democrat Jack Brooks ran for re-election.

Texas's 9th congressional district, 1978
Party	Candidate	Votes	%
Democratic	Jack Brooks (incumbent)	50,792	63.28
Republican	Randy Evans	29,473	34.23
Total votes		80,265	100
Democratic hold			

=== District 10 ===
Incumbent Democrat J. J. Pickle ran for re-election.

Texas's 10th congressional district, 1978
Party	Candidate	Votes	%
Democratic	J. J. Pickle (incumbent)	94,529	76.32
Republican	Emmett Hudsoeth	29,328	23.68
Total votes		123,857	100
Democratic hold			

=== District 11 ===
Incumbent Democrat William R. Poage opted to retire rather than run for re-election. He resigned on December 31, 1978, four days before his term would have expired.

Texas's 11th congressional district, 1978
Party	Candidate	Votes	%
Democratic	Marvin Leath	53,354	51.64
Republican	Jack Burgess	49,965	48.36
Total votes		103,319	100
Democratic hold			

=== District 12 ===
Incumbent Democrat Jim Wright ran for re-election.

Texas's 12th congressional district, 1978
Party	Candidate	Votes	%
Democratic	Jim Wright (incumbent)	46,456	68.50
Republican	Claude Brown	21,364	31.50
Total votes		67,820	100
Democratic hold			

=== District 13 ===
Incumbent Democrat Jack Hightower ran for re-election.

Texas's 13th congressional district, 1978
Party	Candidate	Votes	%
Democratic	Jack Hightower (incumbent)	75,271	74.86
Republican	Clifford Jones	25,275	25.14
Total votes		100,546	100
Democratic hold			

=== District 14 ===
Incumbent Democrat John Andrew Young ran for re-election. He lost in the Democratic Primary to Joseph Wyatt.

Texas's 14th congressional district, 1978
Party	Candidate	Votes	%
Democratic	Joseph Wyatt	63,953	72.45
Republican	Jay Yates	24,325	27.55
Total votes		88,278	100
Democratic hold			

=== District 15 ===
Incumbent Democrat Kika de la Garza ran for re-election.

Texas's 15th congressional district, 1978
Party	Candidate	Votes	%
Democratic	Kika de la Garza (incumbent)	54,560	66.20
Republican	Robert McDonald	27,853	33.80
Total votes		82,413	100
Democratic hold			

=== District 16 ===
Incumbent Democrat Richard Crawford White ran for re-election.

Texas's 16th congressional district, 1978
Party	Candidate	Votes	%
Democratic	Richard Crawford White (incumbent)	53,090	70.01
Republican	Robert McDonald	22,743	29.99
Total votes		75,833	100
Democratic hold			

=== District 17 ===
Incumbent Democrat Omar Burleson opted to retire rather than run for re-election.

Texas's 17th congressional district, 1978
Party	Candidate	Votes	%
Democratic	Charles Stenholm	69,030	68.12
Republican	Billy Fisher	32,302	31.88
Total votes		101,332	100
Democratic hold			

=== District 18 ===
Incumbent Democrat Barbara Jordan opted to retire rather than run for re-election.

Texas's 18th congressional district, 1978
Party	Candidate	Votes	%
Democratic	Mickey Leland	36,783	96.75
Socialist Workers	Deborah Vernier	1,235	3.25
Total votes		38,018	100
Democratic hold			

=== District 19 ===
Incumbent Democrat George H. Mahon opted to retire rather than run for re-election. Future Governor and president George W. Bush was defeated in this election.

Texas's 19th congressional district, 1978
Party	Candidate	Votes	%
Democratic	Kent Hance	54,729	53.24
Republican	George W. Bush	48,070	46.76
Total votes		102,799	100
Democratic hold			

=== District 20 ===
Incumbent Democrat Henry B. González ran for re-election unopposed.

Texas's 20th congressional district, 1978
Party	Candidate	Votes	%
Democratic	Henry B. Gonzalez (incumbent)	51,584	100.00
Total votes		51,584	100
Democratic hold			

=== District 21 ===
Incumbent Democrat Bob Krueger retired to run for U.S. Senator.

Texas's 21st congressional district, 1978
Party	Candidate	Votes	%
Republican	Tom Loeffler	84,336	57.05
Democratic	Nelson Wolff	63,501	42.95
Total votes		147,837	100
Republican gain from Democratic			

=== District 22 ===
Incumbent Democrat Robert Gammage ran for re-election.

Texas's 22nd congressional district, 1978
Party	Candidate	Votes	%
Republican	Ron Paul	54,643	50.56
Democratic	Robert Gammage (incumbent)	53,443	49.44
Total votes		108,086	100
Republican gain from Democratic			

=== District 23 ===
Incumbent Democrat Abraham Kazen ran for re-election.

Texas's 23rd congressional district, 1978
Party	Candidate	Votes	%
Democratic	Abraham Kazen (incumbent)	62,649	89.71
Raza Unida	Agustin Mata	7,185	10.29
Total votes		69,834	100
Democratic hold			

=== District 24 ===
Incumbent Democrat Dale Milford ran for re-election. He lost in the Democratic Primary to Martin Frost.

Texas's 24th congressional district, 1978
Party	Candidate	Votes	%
Democratic	Martin Frost	39,201	54.06
Republican	Leo Berman	33,314	45.94
Total votes		72,515	100
Democratic hold			
