= 1974 Texas gubernatorial election =

- November 5, 1974
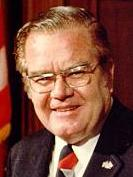

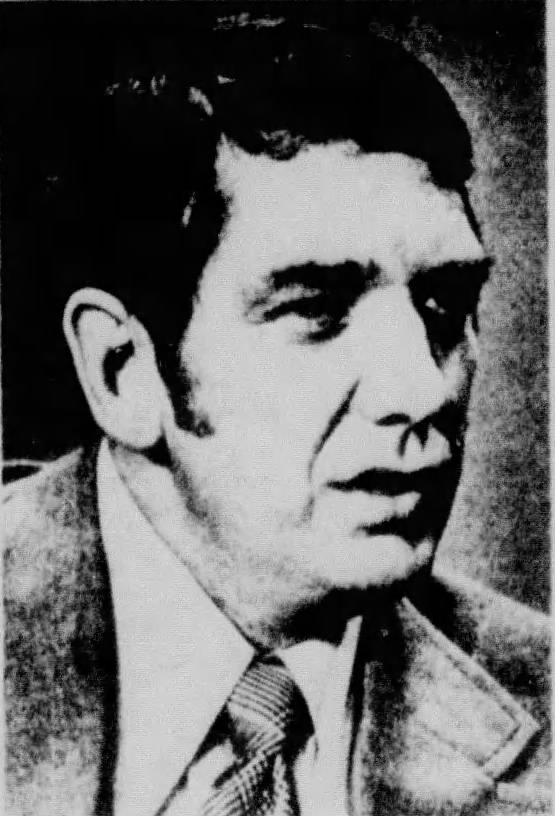

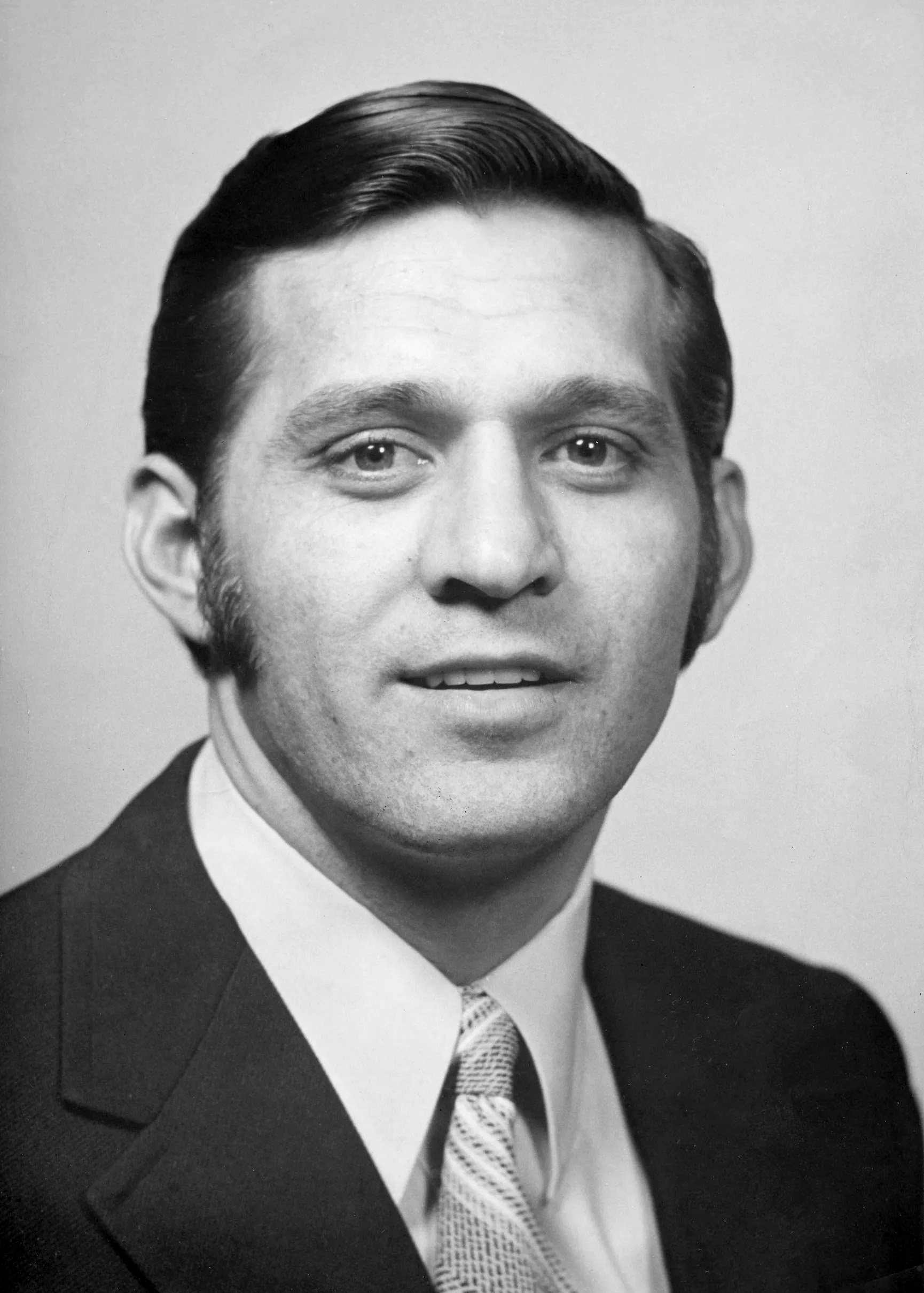
Nominee	Dolph Briscoe	Jim Granberry	Ramsey Muñiz
Party	Democratic	Republican	Raza Unida
Popular vote	1,016,334	514,725	93,295
Percentage	61.41%	31.07%	5.63%
- County results Briscoe: 40–50% 50–60% 60–70% 70–80% 80–90% >90% Granberry: 50–60% Muñiz: 50–60%
Governor before election
Dolph Briscoe
Democratic
Elected Governor
Dolph Briscoe
Democratic

The 1974 Texas gubernatorial election was held on November 5, 1974, to elect the governor of Texas. Incumbent Democratic Governor Dolph Briscoe was easily re-elected to a second term, winning 61% of the vote to the 31% of Republican Jim Granberry, the former mayor of Lubbock. Raza Unida candidate Ramsey Muniz won 6%, while the remaining 2% were cast for other candidates.

Briscoe was sworn in for his second term on January 21, 1975. As the Constitution of Texas had been amended in 1972 to extend the governor's term from two years to four, Briscoe became the first governor to be sworn in for a four-year term since Edmund J. Davis.

Briscoe carried 249 out of 254 counties in his landslide reelection victory. As of 2023, this remains the last time that a Democrat was reelected as governor of Texas, and the last time a Democrat carried Dallam, Sherman, Hansford, Lipscomb, Hemphill, Hutchinson, Roberts, Gray, Moore, Hartley, Potter, Armstrong, Deaf Smith, Parmer, Bailey, Hale, Yoakum, Borden, Scurry, Andrews, Ector, Midland, Loving, Glasscock, Sterling, Tom Green, Irion, Crockett, Jeff Davis, Taylor, Cooke, Rockwall, Gregg, Rusk, Montgomery, Aransas, Victoria, DeWitt, McMullen, Live Oak, Guadalupe, Comal, Kendall, Bandera, Kerr, Edwards, Blanco, Gillespie, Mason, Kimble, and Sutton counties. The counties of Collin and Denton would not vote for a Democrat again until 2026.

== Primaries ==
=== Republican ===
Republican primary results
Party	Candidate	Votes	%
Republican	Jim Granberry	53,617	77.59%
Republican	Odell McBrayer	15,484	22.41%
Total votes		69,101	100.00%

=== Democratic ===
Democratic primary results
Party	Candidate	Votes	%
Democratic	Dolph Briscoe (Inc.)	1,025,632	67.42%
Democratic	Frances Farenthold	437,287	28.47%
Democratic	William H. Posey	31,498	2.07%
Democratic	Steve S. Alexander	26,889	1.77%
Total votes		1,521,306	100.00%

== Results ==
Results for Raza Unida by county: Muñiz: 0–5%; 5–10%; 10–15%; 15–20%; 20–25%; 25–30%; >30%

General election results
Party	Candidate	Votes	%
Democratic	Dolph Briscoe (Inc.)	1,016,334	61.41%
Republican	Jim Granberry	514,725	31.07%
Raza Unida	Ramsey Muniz	93,295	5.63%
American Independent	S. W. McDonnell	22,208	1.34%
Socialist Workers	Sherry Smith	8,171	0.49%
Total votes		1,654,984	100.00%
Democratic hold			
