= Public Leadership Education Network =

Nonprofit organization in Washington, D.C.

Public Leadership Education Network (PLEN)
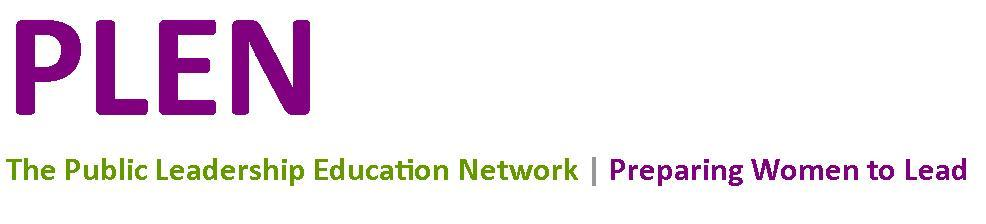
- Founded: 1978
- Founder: Frances Tartlon (Sissy) Farenthold
- Purpose: Women and other marginalized gender groups, Leadership, Education
- Location: Washington, D.C.
- Key people: https://plen.org/leadership/
- Website: https://plen.org/

Public Leadership Education Network (PLEN) is a nonprofit organization based in Washington, D.C. Its focus is to introduce college women and marginalized gender groups to role models, career paths, and skills trainings before they enter the workforce, to help prepare them for leadership roles in public service. PLEN’s mission is to empower, educate, and engage women and marginalized gender groups in public policy to promote diverse, inclusive leadership in policy making.

== History ==
PLEN was founded in 1978 by Frances Farenthold, President of Wells College. Farenthold brought her experiences as a Texas state legislator and candidate for governor to her new role as president of a women's college, proposing that women's colleges work together to educate women for public leadership.

With national recognition because her name was placed in nomination for the Vice Presidency at the Democratic National Convention in 1972, and her election as the founding president of the bi-partisan National Women's Political Caucus, Farenthold gained key support for her vision from Ruth Mandel who directed the Center for American Women and Politics and Betsey Wright who headed the National Women's Education Fund. Ruth and Betsey worked with Farenthold to turn her idea into a successful proposal to the Carnegie Corporation of New York. With this major foundation support, PLEN was established in 1978. Programs aimed at preparing women students for leadership in the public arena were initially campus-based.

PLEN created its first Washington-based seminar in 1983, and moved its headquarters to Washington, DC in 1989 to expand its program offerings that bring women students to the Nation's Capital to learn from women leaders about the public policy process.

== Programs ==
PLEN offers a variety of annual seminars with topics and themes such as those listed below. These vary from year to year and commonly align with fall, winter, spring, and summer breaks on a typical academic calendar.

- Global Policy
- Health Policy
- Law and Legal Advocacy
- STEM Policy
- Public Policy
- Women of Color Influencing Washington
- Looking Forward to the Future

PLEN also partners with colleges and universities to curate on-site co-curricular programming in advocacy, running for office, and working on Capitol Hill.

== Past programming ==
Women & Congress: Students meet with female members of the House and Senate, members of their staff, advocates, and other leaders in government relations. Notable speakers include Congresswoman Eleanor Holmes Norton, Senator Mary Landrieu, Congresswoman Virginia Foxx and Congresswoman Judy Biggert.

Women in Business Policy: Students meet with female members of the House and Senate, members of their staff, advocates, and other leaders in government relations. Notable speakers include Laura Lane President of Global Affairs at UPS, Director of Federal Government Affairs at the American Express Company Ellie Shaw, and others

Women Unlocking Nonprofits: Students meet with female leaders from nonprofit organizations and advocates doing policy work in and around DC. Notable speakers include Director of Diversity & Inclusion at the Human Rights Campaign Nicole Cozier, Director of Advocacy and Legislative Affairs at Goodwill Laura Walling, and others.

== Membership ==
PLEN membership is open to all colleges, universities, and subsets within them such as political science departments, women's studies programs, women's centers, and career development centers. Membership fees are paid in the summer, which provides students with discounted prices and other benefits throughout the academic year. A current list of members can be found here.

=== Member institutions ===
- Augustana College, Rock Island, IL
- Bryn Mawr College, Bryn Mawr, PA
- Chatham University, Pittsburgh, PA
- College of Saint Benedict, St. Joseph, MN
- Douglass Residential College (Rutgers University students included), New Brunswick, NJ
- Hood College, Frederick, MD
- Luther College, Decorah, IA
- Mount St. Mary’s University, Los Angeles, CA
- Newcomb College Institute (Tulane University students included), New Orleans, LA | PLEN at Tulane
- Scripps College, Claremont, CA
- Smith College, Northampton, MA
- St. Catherine University, St. Paul, MN
- St. Lawrence University, Canton, NY
- Texas Woman's University, Denton, TX
- William Smith College, Hobart and William Smith Colleges, Geneva, NY
