= 1978 United States Senate election in Texas =

- November 7, 1978
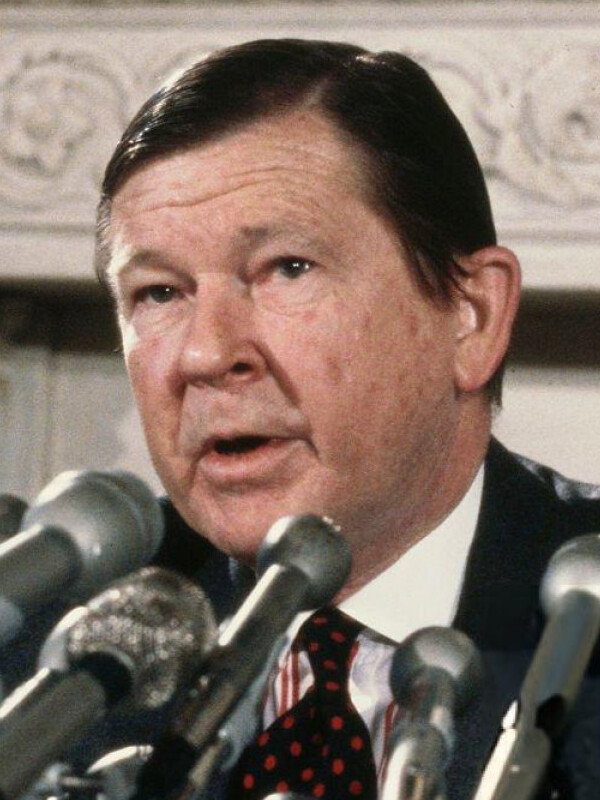

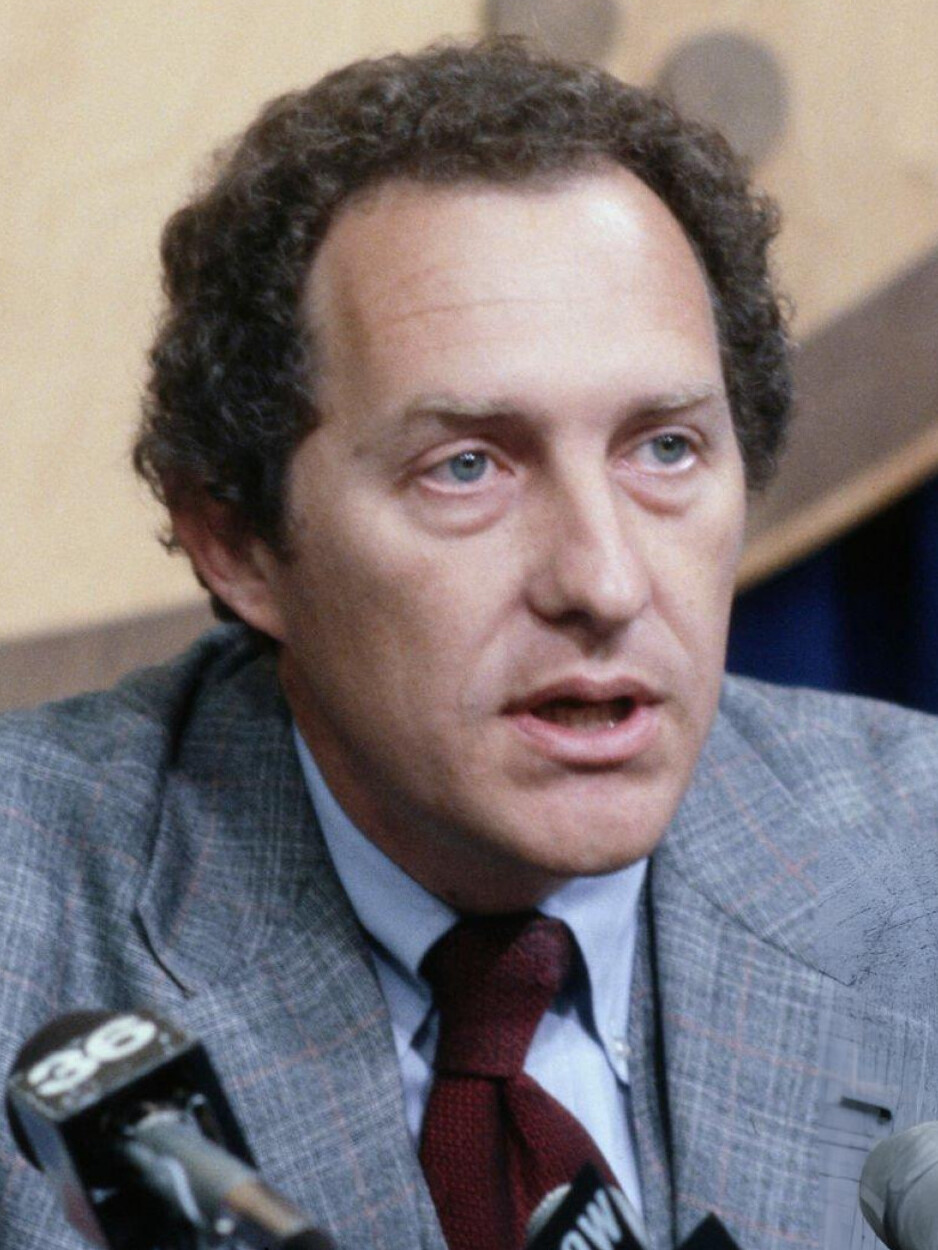
| Nominee | John Tower | Bob Krueger |
| Party | Republican | Democratic |
| Popular vote | 1,151,376 | 1,139,149 |
| Percentage | 49.79% | 49.26% |
- County results Tower: 50–60% 60–70% 70–80% Krueger: 50–60% 60–70% 70–80% 80–90% Tie: 50%
U.S. senator before election
John Tower
Republican
Elected U.S. Senator
John Tower
Republican

The 1978 United States Senate election in Texas was held on November 7, 1978. Incumbent Republican U.S. Senator John Tower narrowly won re-election to a fourth term. This was the closest that a Texas Democrat had come to defeating an incumbent Republican U.S. Senator until the 2026 election.

== Republican primary ==
=== Candidates ===
==== Nominee ====
- John G. Tower, incumbent U.S. Senator since 1961

==== Declined ====
- Hank Grover, former State Senator (1967-1973) and candidate for Governor of Texas in 1972

=== Results ===
Republican primary results
| Party | Candidate | Votes | % |
|---|---|---|---|
| Republican | John Tower (incumbent) | 142,202 | 100.00% |
| Total votes | | 142,202 | 100.00% |

== Democratic primary ==
=== Candidates ===
==== Nominee ====
- Bob Krueger, U.S. Representative from New Braunfels since 1975

==== Eliminated in primary ====
- Joe Christie, former State Senator from El Paso (1967–1973)

=== Campaign ===
Krueger and Christie presented a choice between moderate institutionalism and consumer-focused populism; while Krueger emphasized his expertise in energy deregulation, Christie campaigned on utility reform and opposition to rising electricity rates.

=== Results ===
Democratic primary results
| Party | Candidate | Votes | % |
|---|---|---|---|
| Democratic | Bob Krueger | 853,460 | 54.67 |
| Democratic | Joe Christie | 707,738 | 45.33 |
| Total votes | | 1,561,198 | 100.0 |

== General election ==
=== Campaign ===
Krueger held a narrow lead in the polls late in the race, although the race was considered to be a 'toss-up.' On the issues, Tower attacked Krueger for voting for a constitutional amendment that would have granted U.S. senators to the District of Columbia, while Krueger attacked Tower for being an ineffective representative and a drunk. As a result of the charge, Tower refused to shake Krueger's hand at a joint appearance.

=== Results ===
Republicans celebrated the result in this election year as the 'best in a century' despite the narrow win. One analysis in The New York Times cites the growing urban middle-class voters in Houston who migrated from the Northeast as the reason for Tower being able to pull ahead and win.

General election results
| Party | Candidate | Votes | % |
|---|---|---|---|
| Republican | John Tower (incumbent) | 1,151,376 | 49.79% |
| Democratic | Bob Krueger | 1,139,149 | 49.26% |
| Raza Unida | Luis Diaz de Leon | 17,869 | 0.77% |
| Socialist Workers | Miguel Pendas | 4,018 | 0.17% |
| Write-in | | 128 | 0.01% |
| Total votes | | 2,312,540 | 100.0% |
| Republican hold | | | |

== See also ==
- 1978 United States Senate elections
