= Aurora Estrada Orozco =

Mexican-American community leader and writer

Aurora Estrada Orozco (May 8, 1918 – February 9, 2011) was a Mexican-American community leader and writer.

Aurora Estrada Orozco was born on May 8, 1918, in Cerralvo, Nuevo León, Mexico. Her family immigrated to the United States when she was young. She attended schools in Mercedes, Texas, and graduated from Mercedes High School in 1937. She attended business classes at the University of Texas at Austin before marrying Primitivo Orozco Vega in 1950. They moved to Cuero, Texas. She had six children and was active with her local Parent-Teacher Association.

Orozco worked at Lieberman's Department Store and became an active community leader. She organized a League of United Latin American Citizens (LULAC) in Cuero in the 1970s and served as its secretary. She was secretary of Familias Unidas of Cuero from 1975 to 1977. She was the chief representative for the Raza Unida Party in Cuero from 1974 to 1978.

Orozco also wrote in Spanish. Her works included an autobiography, poetry and short stories.

Orozco died on February 9, 2011, in Austin, Texas.
