= 1972 Texas gubernatorial election =

- November 7, 1972
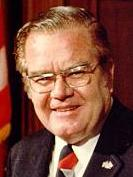

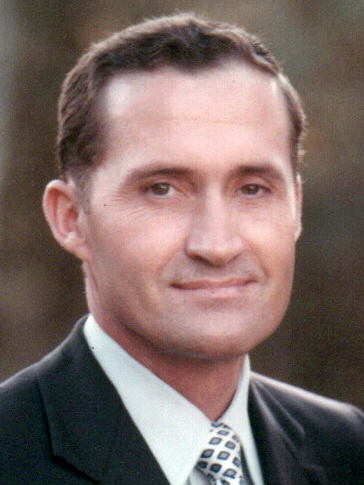

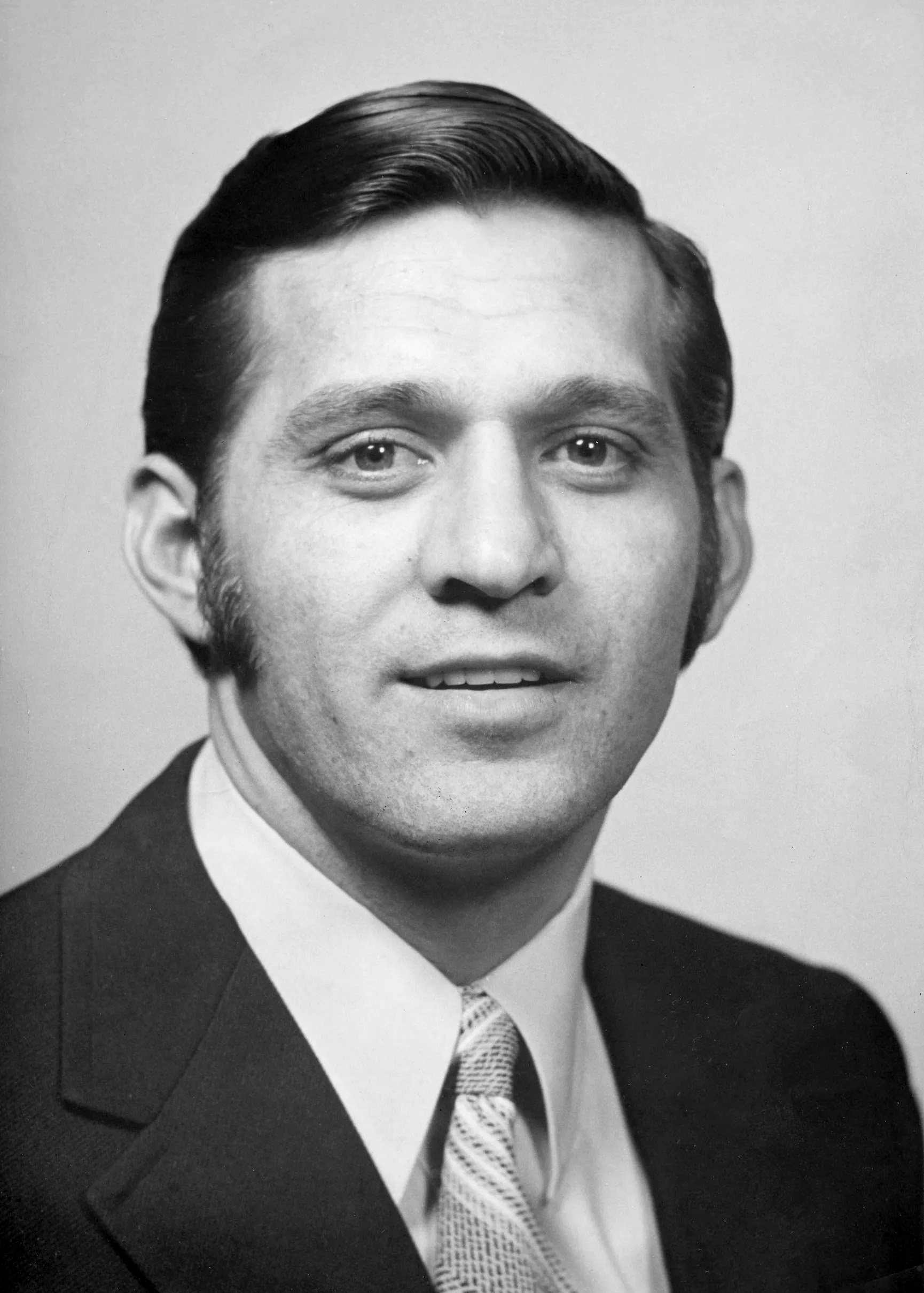
Nominee	Dolph Briscoe	Henry Grover	Ramsey Muñiz
Party	Democratic	Republican	Raza Unida
Popular vote	1,633,493	1,533,986	214,118
Percentage	47.91%	44.99%	6.28%
- County results Briscoe: 40–50% 50–60% 60–70% 70–80% 80–90% Grover: 40–50% 50–60% 60–70% Muñiz: 40–50% 50–60%
Governor before election
Preston Smith
Democratic
Elected Governor
Dolph Briscoe
Democratic

The 1972 Texas gubernatorial election was held on November 7, 1972, to elect the governor of Texas. Incumbent Democratic governor Preston Smith ran for reelection, but lost renomination to businessman Dolph Briscoe. Smith was overwhelmingly rejected in the Democratic primary, taking fourth place with only 8% of the vote amid the fallout from the Sharpstown scandal. Briscoe went on to win the general election by a relatively small margin, winning 48% of the vote to Republican Henry Grover's 45%. Raza Unida candidate Ramsey Muniz won 6%. This was the first time since 1894 that a governor of Texas won the election without securing a majority of the popular vote.

As of 2022, this is the last time Jim Hogg and Brooks counties did not vote for the Democratic candidate, instead voting for the Raza Unida party.

The 1972 election marked the last time that a gubernatorial election was held concurrently with a presidential election and the last time that a governor was elected for a two-year term.

== Democratic primary ==
=== Candidates ===
- Ben Barnes, lieutenant governor and former speaker of the Texas House of Representatives
- Dolph Briscoe, former state representative from Uvalde and candidate for governor in 1968
- Frances Farenthold, state representative from Corpus Christi
- Robert E. Looney
- William H. Posey
- Preston Smith, incumbent governor
- Gordon F. Wills

=== Results ===
Democratic primary results
Party	Candidate	Votes	%
Democratic	Dolph Briscoe	963,397	43.93%
Democratic	Frances Farenthold	612,051	27.91%
Democratic	Ben Barnes	392,356	17.89%
Democratic	Preston Smith (incumbent)	190,709	8.70%
Democratic	William H. Posey	13,727	0.62%
Democratic	Gordon F. Wills	10,438	0.48%
Democratic	Robert E. Looney	10,225	0.47%
Total votes		2,192,903	100.00%

=== Runoff ===
Democratic runoff results
Party	Candidate	Votes	%
Democratic	Dolph Briscoe	1,095,168	55.32%
Democratic	Frances Farenthold	884,594	44.68%
Total votes		1,979,762	100.00%

== Republican primary ==
=== Candidates ===
- Albert B. Fay, Houston oilman
- Henry Grover, former state representative from Harris County
- John A. Hall Sr.
- J. A. Jenkins
- Tom McElroy
- David Reagan

=== Results ===
Republican primary results
Party	Candidate	Votes	%
Republican	Henry Grover	37,118	32.56%
Republican	Albert B. Fay	24,329	21.34%
Republican	David Reagan	20,119	17.65%
Republican	Tom McElroy	19,559	17.16%
Republican	John A. Hall Sr.	8,018	7.03%
Republican	J. A. Jenkins	4,864	4.27%
Total votes		114,007	100.00%

=== Runoff ===
Republican runoff results
Party	Candidate	Votes	%
Republican	Henry Grover	37,842	66.38%
Republican	Albert B. Fay	19,166	33.62%
Total votes		57,008	100.00%

== Results ==
Results for Raza Unida by county: Muñiz: 0–5%; 5–10%; 10–15%; 15–20%; 20–25%; 25–30%; >30%

General election results
Party	Candidate	Votes	%
Democratic	Dolph Briscoe	1,633,493	47.91%
Republican	Henry Grover	1,533,986	44.99%
Raza Unida	Ramsey Muniz	214,118	6.28%
Socialist Workers	Deborah Leonard	24,103	0.71%
Others		3,891	0.11%
Total votes		3,409,501	100.00%
Democratic hold			
