= Las Madres de la Casa Verde =

Chicana women activists

Las Madres de la Casa Verde were a group of Chicana women in Pueblo, Colorado that formed to support the Chicano community in the lower eastside. They worked closely with other activist groups such as La Raza Unida and the Brown Berets.

The original nine Mothers of La Casa Verde were Donna Herrera, Mary Herrera, Lola Lovato, Prudencia Medina, Eva Montoya, Peggy Rodriguez, Bea Roybal, Josie Valdez and Helen Pacheco Young.

== Creation ==
The Mothers on the Lower Eastside came together to focus on inequities that their children faced. Children did not have adequate recreation areas, such as parks or sidewalks, so they played in the streets. After multiple children were hit by cars, the Mothers began working towards creating safe spaces for their children and their community to come together.

They developed a community center at the corner of Joplin and Catalpa, which they called La Casa Verde. The center offered recreation, tutoring, cultural education and support services.

== La Casa Verde ==
They hosted lunches to raise money and awareness for Casa Verde Youth, La Raza Unida and the Brown Berets. Groups used La Casa Verde as a meeting space and a support center. The Mothers held fundraisers for Casa Verde Youth, for legal defense of people protesting the Vietnam War and fighting for civil rights in Pueblo, and practical matters like helping people pay rent or utilities.

The educational program at La Casa Verde was strong. The tutoring program developed into a Chicano school called "Escuela Huitzhualopan," which means "school for the people of the sun." Their curriculum focused on Chicano-centered content and removing the Eurocentric focus from how traditional history was taught.

The Mothers, along with the Brown Berets and La Raza Unida, planned the first local Cinco de Mayo celebration in 1969. The main purpose was to be a day of protest, enlightenment, struggle, and awareness of the positive aspects of Mexican history. Over 1000 people attended the celebration at Mineral Palace Park. Corky Gonzales was the main speaker. The gathering was partly inspired to protest police brutality against Chicano youth.

In addition to educational and cultural activities, La Casa Verde also supported political activism. They participated in the National Grape Boycott, the Coors boycott, and high school walkouts. After a brutal high school fight in 1974 where Chicano students were targeted, they spoke at a press conference to condemn the actions of administrators, teachers, and police, for escalating the situation.

== Plaza Verde Park ==
In 1972, the Mothers worked with the Pueblo Department of Parks and Recreation to create a park in their neighborhood using land damaged by the 1965 flood. Plaza Verde Park was developed at the corner of Hudson Ave. and Ash St.

There are multiple tributes to the Mothers in the park. In 2013, the Native American community sponsored an Earth Day cleanup and mural painting. The outer walls of the park bathroom depict a mural featuring nine roses that represent the nine Mothers.

In 2016, a group called Las Comadres donated a Rose Garden Memorial with a historical marker bench and nine rose bushes to commemorate the Mothers and the history of the lower eastside.

== See also ==
- El Movimiento
- Chicano Moratorium
- Chicana feminism
- Los Seis de Boulder
