= Dolph Briscoe =

Governor of Texas from 1973 to 1979

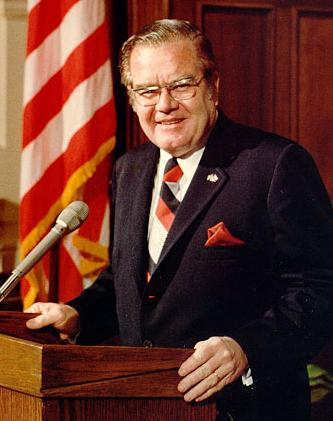
- Briscoe in 1976

41st Governor of Texas
- In office January 16, 1973 – January 16, 1979
- Lieutenant: William P. Hobby Jr.
- Preceded by: Preston Smith
- Succeeded by: Bill Clements

Member of the Texas House of Representatives from the 79th district
- In office January 13, 1953 – January 8, 1957
- Preceded by: Ligon L. Holstein
- Succeeded by: Jack Richardson

Member of the Texas House of Representatives from the 77th district
- In office January 11, 1949 – January 13, 1953
- Preceded by: Britton T. Edwards
- Succeeded by: A.J. Bishop Jr.

Personal details
- Born: Dolph Briscoe Jr. April 23, 1923 Uvalde, Texas, U.S.
- Died: June 27, 2010 (aged 87) Uvalde, Texas, U.S.
- Resting place: Briscoe Rio Frio Ranch Cemetery
- Party: Democratic
- Spouse: Janey Slaughter (m. 1942; died 2000)
- Children: 3
- Relatives: Andrew Briscoe; Parmenas Briscoe (ancestors)
- Education: University of Texas at Austin (BA)
- Profession: Rancher, politician
- Website: Official website

Military service
- Allegiance: United States
- Branch/service: United States Army
- Years of service: 1942–1945
- Rank: Second Lieutenant
- Battles/wars: World War II

Dolph Briscoe Jr. (April 23, 1923 – June 27, 2010) was an American rancher and businessman from Uvalde, Texas, who was the 41st governor of Texas between 1973 and 1979. He was a conservative Democrat.

Because of his re-election following an amendment to the Texas Constitution doubling the Governor's term to four years, Briscoe became both the last governor to serve a two-year term and the first to serve a four-year term.

A lifelong resident of Uvalde, Briscoe was first elected to the Texas Legislature in 1948 and served as a state representative from 1949 to 1957. As part of the reform movement in state politics stemming from the Sharpstown scandal, Briscoe won election as governor in 1972. During his six years as governor, Briscoe presided during a period of reform in state government as Texas's population and commerce boomed.

Following his two terms as governor, Briscoe returned to the ranching and banking business in Uvalde. He is recognized as having been one of the leading citizens of the state and a benevolent supporter of many civic, cultural, and educational institutions in Texas and the nation. Most recently before his death the former Texas governor established the Dolph and Janey Briscoe Fund for Texas History at the University of Texas at Austin.

He was the last Democratic Governor of Texas to be re-elected with his reelection landslide victory in 1974; fellow Democratic governors Mark White and Ann Richards lost their re-election bids respectively, in 1986 and 1994.

== Early years ==
Dolph Briscoe Jr., was born on April 23, 1923, the only child of Dolph Sr. and Georgie Briscoe in Uvalde, Texas. His father was a descendant of Texas Declaration of Independence signer Andrew Briscoe. Briscoe was first attracted to politics at an early age. Thanks to his father's friendship with Governor Ross Sterling, the young Briscoe traveled to Austin and the Texas Governor's Mansion in 1932. At the age of nine, Governor Sterling invited Briscoe to stay at the mansion and sleep in Sam Houston's bed.

After graduation from Uvalde High School as valedictorian, Briscoe attended the University of Texas at Austin. He was active in many campus organizations, including the Friar Society, the Texas Cowboys, Chi Phi fraternity, and was editor of The Cactus yearbook. While at the university, he met fellow student Betty Jane "Janey" Slaughter (1923 – 2000) of Austin. They married in 1942 and had three children.

After graduation from the University of Texas in 1943 with a Bachelor of Arts degree, Briscoe enlisted as a private in the United States Army. He served in the China Burma India Theater during World War II and advanced in rank to become an officer.

== Political career ==
When Briscoe returned from military service, he returned home to Uvalde and the ranching business. He soon rekindled his interest in politics. Briscoe counted Vice President John Nance Garner, President Lyndon Baines Johnson, House Speaker Sam Rayburn, and Governor Sterling as his political mentors.

Briscoe's first step into elective politics began with a race for state representative in the Texas House of Representatives in 1948. He won his first election and was re-elected in 1950, 1952 and 1954 and served from 1949 to 1957. He became best known as the co-author of the Colson-Briscoe Act, which appropriated funding for the state's farm-to-market road system.

== 1968 campaign for Governor ==
In 1968, Briscoe attempted to reenter the political arena, when he joined a list of candidates seeking to replace retiring Texas Gov. John Connally, who chose not to seek a fourth term. Briscoe finished fourth in the Democratic gubernatorial primary that year.

There was a runoff between the more liberal contender, Don Yarborough of Houston (no relation to U.S. Senator Ralph Yarborough), and Lieutenant Governor Preston Smith of Lubbock. Smith won the runoff and then defeated Republican Paul Eggers by a margin of 57 percent to 43 percent in the November general election and was subsequently re-elected defeating Eggers in their 1970 rematch, 53 percent to 46 percent.

== Governorship ==
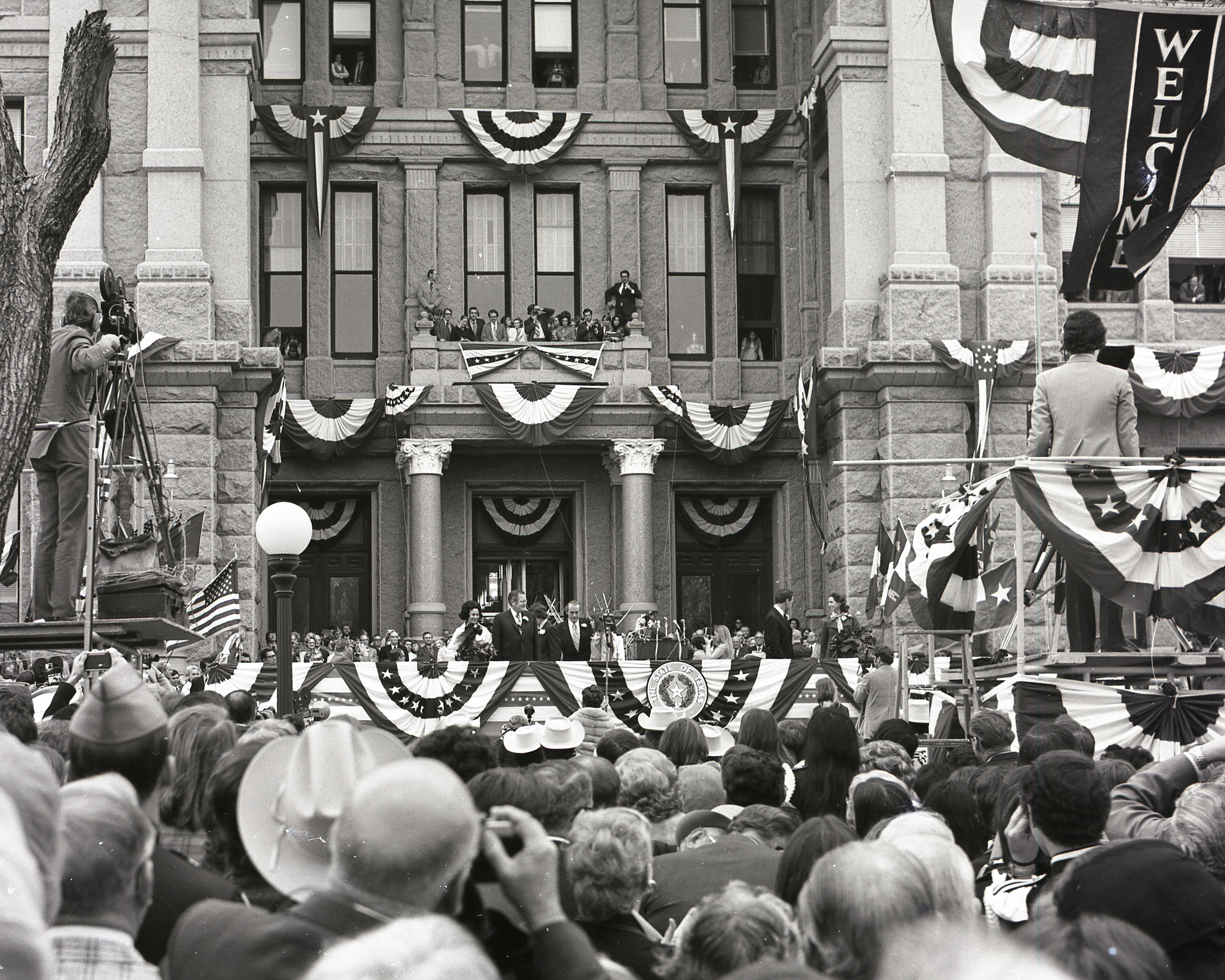
Briscoe at his 1973 inauguration

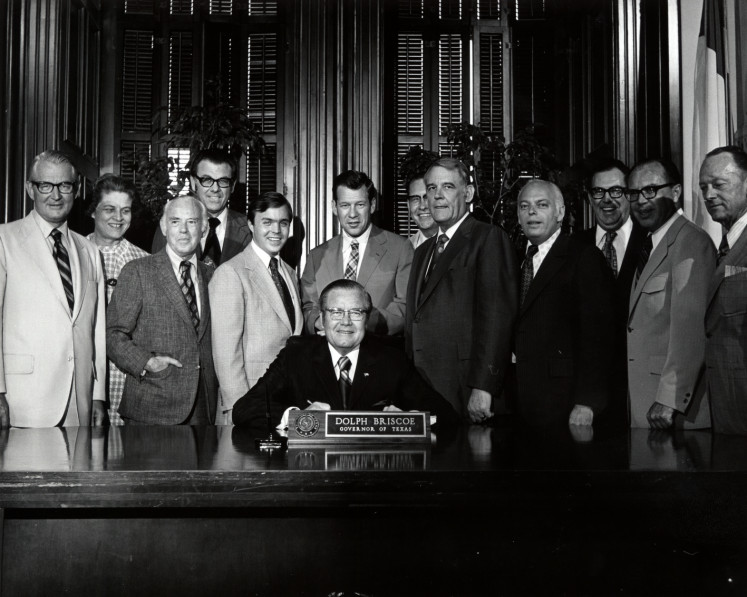
Governor Dolph Briscoe in 1973

Briscoe was inaugurated as the forty-first governor of Texas on January 16, 1973.

During his two terms as governor, Briscoe balanced increasing demands for more state services and a rapidly growing population. As the governor elected during a period of social unrest and skepticism about the motives of elected officials, he helped restore integrity to a state government fallen into disgrace as a result of the Sharpstown scandals. Briscoe's terms as governor led to a landmark events and achievements, including the most extensive ethics and financial disclosure bill in state history, passage of the Open Meetings and Open Records legislation, and strengthened laws regulating lobbyists. Briscoe also presided over the first revision of the state's penal code in one hundred years.

Briscoe added $4 billion in new state funds for public education and higher education, increased teacher salaries by the highest percentage in history, and raised salaries for state employees as well. He expanded services to handicapped Texans by the Texas Department of Mental Health and Mental Retardation, and established the first toll-free hotline for runaway children. He appointed a larger number of women and minorities to positions in Texas state government than any previous governor, appointed the first African American members to state boards, and named the first African American district judge. No new state taxes were passed during Briscoe's terms as governor, making him the first governor since World War II to hold the line on both new state taxes or increasing existing ones.

As governor, he focused on the maintenance and efficiency of existing government agencies as opposed to the creation of new ones. As a veteran rancher, Briscoe also worked to help the farmers and ranchers of the state during his tenure. This included the eradication of the screw worm on both sides of the Rio Grande.

Dolph Briscoe also advocated a reduction of the state speed limit to 55 mph in the aftermath of the 1973 Arab Oil Embargo. The Texas Highway Commission voted 3-0 in favor of his recommendation on December 4, 1973. The measure was overturned in the Texas Supreme Court two days later. Briscoe, along with the Texas legislature adopted the 55 mph speed limit passed by congress in January 1974.

Briscoe ran for a third term in 1978, but lost to then-Texas Attorney General John Luke Hill in the 1978 Democratic primary. Hill would go on to narrowly lose to businessman Bill Clements in the general election, marking the first time the Democratic Party had lost the Texas governorship since Reconstruction.

== Philanthropy ==
The former governor was also active in the philanthropic community, having given several million dollars to various Texas institutions, mostly centered in and around the San Antonio area. In 2006, he gave a sizeable gift to the Witte Museum, a local gallery which features exhibits specifically geared towards Children. In 2008 he donated $5 million to the University of Texas Health Science Center at San Antonio in support of cardiology research and women's health. This gift was made in honor of his late wife, Janey. Also, that year, he donated $15 million to the Center for American History, which was subsequently renamed the Dolph Briscoe Center for American History and for which he served on the Advisory Council. The Briscoe Center holds the Briscoe Papers, which include his gubernatorial records as well as Briscoe family business records.

In June 2008, Briscoe donated $1.2 million in memory of his late granddaughter, Kate Marmion, to found the Kate Marmion Regional Cancer Medical Center. The CMC will serve patients of southwest Texas counties (Uvalde, Real, Zavala, Edwards, Medina, Maverick, Val Verde, Dimmit and Kinney) who otherwise would have to drive to San Antonio for radiation therapy.

== Death ==
Briscoe died on the evening of June 27, 2010 at his home in Uvalde, Texas following complications of heart and kidney failure at the age of 87. A public viewing for the former Texas Governor was held at the Rushing-Estes-Knowles Funeral Home chapel on Wednesday, June 30, 2010 and funeral services were held at the Saint Phillip's Episcopal Church in Uvalde on July 1, 2010 where thousands of mourners including former Governor Mark White, then-Governor Rick Perry, then-Railroad Commissioner Elizabeth Ames Jones, former Houston Mayor Bill White and others attended the service. He was buried at the Briscoe Rio Frio Ranch Cemetery at the family ranch next to his wife.

In 2011, the Garner Museum in Uvalde, part of the Briscoe Center of American History at the University of Texas at Austin, was renamed the Briscoe-Garner Museum, and the second floor converted for commemoration of Briscoe's life and career.

== Electoral history ==
=== 1972 ===
1972 Texas Gubernatorial Election, Democratic primary
Party	Candidate	Votes	%
Democratic	Dolph Briscoe	963,397	43.93%
Democratic	Frances Farenthold	612,051	27.91%
Democratic	Ben Barnes	392,356	17.89%
Democratic	Preston Smith (incumbent)	190,709	8.70%
Democratic	William H. Posey	13,727	0.62%
Democratic	Gordon F. Wills	10,438	0.48%
Democratic	Robert E. Looney	10,225	0.47%
Total votes		2,192,903	100.00%

1972 Texas Gubernatorial Election, Democratic runoff
Party	Candidate	Votes	%
Democratic	Dolph Briscoe	1,095,168	55.32%
Democratic	Frances Farenthold	884,594	44.68%
Total votes		1,979,762	100.00%

1972 Texas Gubernatorial Election
Party	Candidate	Votes	%
Democratic	Dolph Briscoe	1,633,493	48.79%
Republican	Henry Grover	1,533,986	44.99%
Raza Unida	Ramsey Muniz	214,118	6.28%
Socialist Workers	Deborah Leonard	24,103	0.71%
Others		3,891	0.11%
Total votes		3,409,501	100.00%
Democratic hold			

=== 1974 ===
1974 Texas Gubernatorial Election
Party	Candidate	Votes	%
Democratic	Dolph Briscoe (Inc.)	1,016,334	61.41%
Republican	Jim Granberry	514,725	31.07%
Raza Unida	Ramsey Muniz	93,295	5.63%
American Independent	S. W. McDonnell	22,208	1.34%
Socialist Workers	Sherry Smith	8,171	0.49%
Total votes		1,654,984	100.00%
Democratic hold			

=== 1978 ===
1978 Texas Gubernatorial Election, Democratic Primary
Party	Candidate	Votes	%
Democratic	John Luke Hill	932,245	52.44%
Democratic	Dolph Briscoe (incumbent)	753,309	42.37%
Democratic	Preston Smith	92,202	5.19%
Total votes		1,777,756	100

== Bibliography ==
- Briscoe, Dolph Briscoe: My Life in Texas Ranching and Politics. 2008. ISBN 978-0-9766697-2-2

Party political offices
Preceded by Preston Smith	Democratic nominee for Governor of Texas; 1972, 1974	Succeeded by John Hill
Texas House of Representatives
Preceded by Britton T. Edwards	Member of the Texas House of Representatives from District 77 (Uvalde); 1949–1953	Succeeded by A. J. Bishop, Jr.
Preceded by Ligon L. Holstein	Member of the Texas House of Representatives from District 79 (Uvalde); 1953–1957	Succeeded by Jack Richardson
Political offices
Preceded by Preston Smith	Governor of Texas; January 16, 1973 – January 16, 1979	Succeeded by Bill Clements
