= Martín Serna =

Community organizer for Chicanos in Colorado (1944 - 1978)

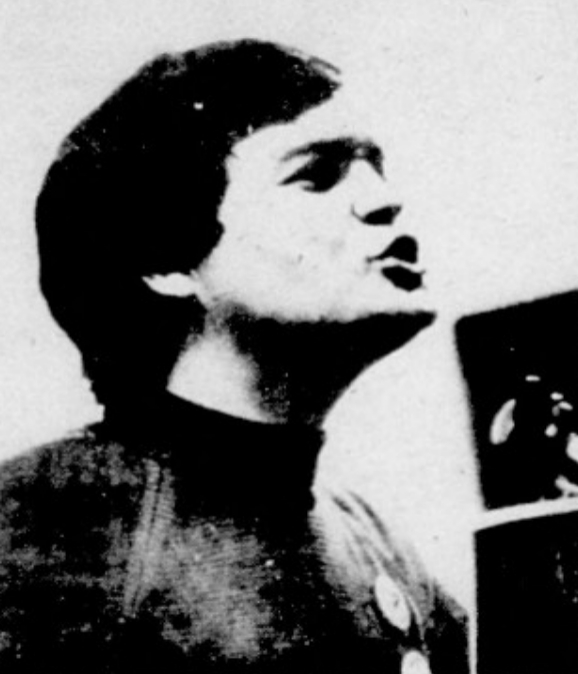
- Serna c. 1970
- Born: November 19, 1944; Avondale, Colorado, U.S.
- Died: November 12, 1978 (aged 33); Denver, Colorado, U.S.
- Occupations: Organizer and activist
- Political party: La Raza Unida
- Spouse(s): Maria Subia; Carmen Roybal Arteaga
- Children: Greg

Martín Porferio "Marty" Serna (November 19, 1944 – November 12, 1978) was an early organizer of the Chicano Movement, who was one of the founders of the Brown Berets in Pueblo, Colorado. He was part of the La Raza Unida political party, and developed several community organizations in Pueblo including the Black/Brown Berets, United Farmworkers Organization, Escuela Huitzhualopán, Southern Colorado Chicano Planning Council, and El Partido de la Raza Unida.

== Biography ==
Serna was born to parents Porfirio and Clara Serna, along with siblings Roberto Dave, Betty Muñoz and Cecilia Ohm. Serna grew up in Avondale raised by his grandparents, and graduated from Pueblo County High School in 1962.

He had Indigenous and mestizo background, and taught his son about Huitzilopochtli and Nahuatl ways.

He served in the U.S. Army as a paratrooper, and in 1965 received an early discharge to support victims of a major flood in the Eastside floodplain. He then became a principal organizer in the preservation for the community on the eastside.

In 1969, he was the Editor-In-Chief of an issue of El Zapatista.

=== Activism ===
Serna studied political science at Southern Colorado State College (SCSC), and received his bachelor's degree from the University of Colorado Denver. He then began law school to pursue legal knowledge in support of the Chicano community. While at SCSC, he inititated the student groups United Mexican American Students (UMAS), Students for a Democratic Society (SDS), Chicanos for Action, and Movimiento Estudiantil Chicano de Aztlán (MEChA).

He played a key role in La Raza Unida and LRU Service Agency, Barrio Coalition Group, Counseling, Remedial, Education, Cultural Enrichment de la Raza (CRECER), Chicano Recreation Program, Salado Improvement District, and the Barrio Batos Against Dope.

His work with La Raza Unida was extensive. Serna was frustrated by Colorado politicians ignoring the problems that Chicanos faced except during elections when "they come around, put on a sombrero, eat a taco, and say, 'Buenos dias.' Those days are over... The Chicano people are coming alive and I think everyone will be surprised when they see how many votes La Raza Unida candidates will get election day."

Serna ran for Congress in Colorado's 3rd district on the Raza Unida ticket in 1970. His platform supported guaranteed income, free education, and changing Anglo attitudes about minorities. He co-authored the first draft of the platform for the Raza Unida Party that was adopted statewide.

He was in the Los Angeles Moratorium against the Vietnam war in August 1980, and was arrested with 23 other Chicanos from Colorado. He was one of the Colorado 23 who were arrested in California on August 30, 1970.

In 1971, he organized the La Raza Unida party convention featuring 600 delegates from 12 states.

In 1970, he organized students at SCSC to remove Coors beer from the school pub. He organized a boycott of the Pueblo Star Journal and the Chieftain, the two major news publications in Pueblo, because of their poor coverage of Chicano-related events and news. He walked 120 miles to Denver to expose the plight of farmworkers.

He worked as Project Coordinator with the Latin American Research and Service Agency (LARASA) in Denver at the time of his death.

He planned the first Cinco de Mayo celebration and 16th de Septiembre events in Pueblo, as well as the first ceremony of Las Pasadas.

=== Personal life ===
Serna's first wife was Maria Subia, and they had a son Greg. They were high school sweethearts.

His second wife was Carmen Roybal Arteaga. They met when she was a student at Adams State College and worked with the Chicano movement in the San Luis Valley.

=== Death and legacy ===
He took his own life in 1978 at age 33, dying of carbon monoxide asphyxia in his Denver, Colorado home. Hundreds of people gathered for his funeral in Pueblo. Brown Berets in military uniform carried his coffin.

His name for the Pueblo Eastside community center, El Centro del Quinto Sol, has remained.

== See also ==
- Chicano movement
- Los Seis de Boulder
- Protests of 1968
