= Henry Grover =

American politician from Texas (1927–2005)

Henry Cushing "Hank" Grover
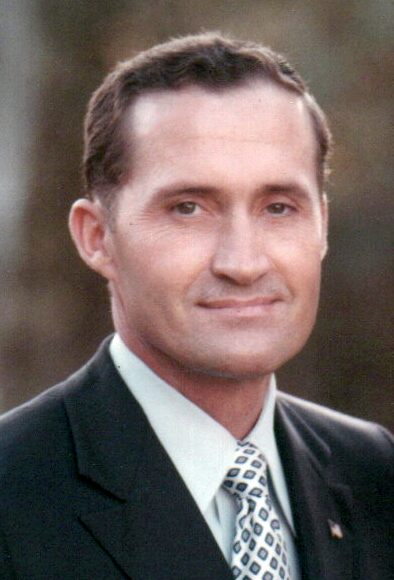
- Grover in 1971

Member of the Texas Senate from the 15th district
- In office January 10, 1967 – January 9, 1973
- Preceded by: Culp Krueger
- Succeeded by: Jack C. Ogg

Member of the Texas House of Representatives from the 23rd district
- In office January 10, 1961 – January 10, 1967
- Preceded by: Clyde Miller
- Succeeded by: Cletus A. "Cowboy" Davis

Personal details
- Born: April 1, 1927 Corpus Christi, Texas, U.S.
- Died: November 28, 2005 (aged 78) Houston, Texas, U.S.
- Party: Republican
- Other political affiliations: Democratic (until 1966)
- Spouse: Kathleen D. Grover (m. 1952)
- Children: 6
- Education: University of St. Thomas (BA); University of Houston (MA)
- Profession: Educator

Henry Cushing Grover (April 1, 1927 – November 28, 2005), usually known as Hank Grover, was an American politician from the U.S. state of Texas best known for his relatively narrow defeat in the 1972 Texas gubernatorial election. If elected, Grover would have been the first Republican and Catholic governor. He died on November 28, 2005, aged 78.

== Early life ==
Grover was born on April 1, 1927, in Corpus Christi. He attended St. Thomas High School in Houston. Grover received his bachelor's degree from Saint Thomas University and his master's degree from the University of Houston. Master of Arts degree in the same subjects from the University of Houston. His master's thesis was on Colonel Edward M. House of Houston, a Democrat active in the campaign to elect Woodrow Wilson as the U.S. president.

He was a high school history teacher at Lamar High School when he was elected to the Texas House of Representatives in 1960.

== Electoral history ==
Republican Party Primary Election, 1996: U.S. Senator (Class 2)
Party	Candidate	Votes	%
Republican	Phil Gramm	838,339	85.01
Republican	David Young	75,463	7.65
Republican	Henry Grover	72,400	7.34
Total votes		986,202	100.00

Texas general election, 1972: Governor
Party	Candidate	Votes	%
Democratic	Dolph Briscoe	1,633,493	47.91
Republican	Henry Grover	1,533,986	44.99
Raza Unida	Ramsey Muñiz	214,118	6.28
Total votes		3,409,591	100.00
Democratic hold			

Republican Party Primary Election, 1972: Governor
Party	Candidate	Votes	%
Republican	Henry Grover	37,118	32.56%
Republican	Albert B. Fay	24,329	21.34%
Republican	David Reagan	20,119	17.65%
Republican	Tom McElroy	19,559	17.16%
Republican	John A. Hall Sr.	8,018	7.03%
Republican	J. A. Jenkins	4,864	4.27%
Total votes		114,007	100.00%

== See also ==
- List of American politicians who switched parties in office

== Sources ==
- Congressional Quarterly's Guide to U.S. Elections
- http://www.legacy.com/NYTIMES/DeathNotices.asp?Page=LifeStory&PersonId=16149533

Texas House of Representatives
Preceded by Clyde Miller	Member of the Texas House of Representatives from District 22-3 (Houston); 1961–1967	Succeeded by Cletus A. "Cowboy" Davis
Texas Senate
Preceded by Culp Krueger	Texas State Senator from District 15 (Houston); 1967–1973	Succeeded by Jack C. Ogg
Party political offices
Preceded by Paul Walter Eggers	Republican gubernatorial nominee in Texas; 1972	Succeeded by Jim Granberry
