= Raza Unida Party =

Southwestern U.S. political party (1970–1978)

National Party of the United Race Partido Nacional de La Raza Unida
- Chairman: Xenaro Ayala
- Founder: José Ángel Gutiérrez; Mario Compean
- Founded: January 17, 1970
- Dissolved: 1978; 48 years ago (Note: After doing poorly in its final election of 1978, the party was dissolved as it lost its members and registration.)
- Ideology: Chicano nationalism Mexican American interests Left-wing nationalism
- Political position: Left-wing

Party flag
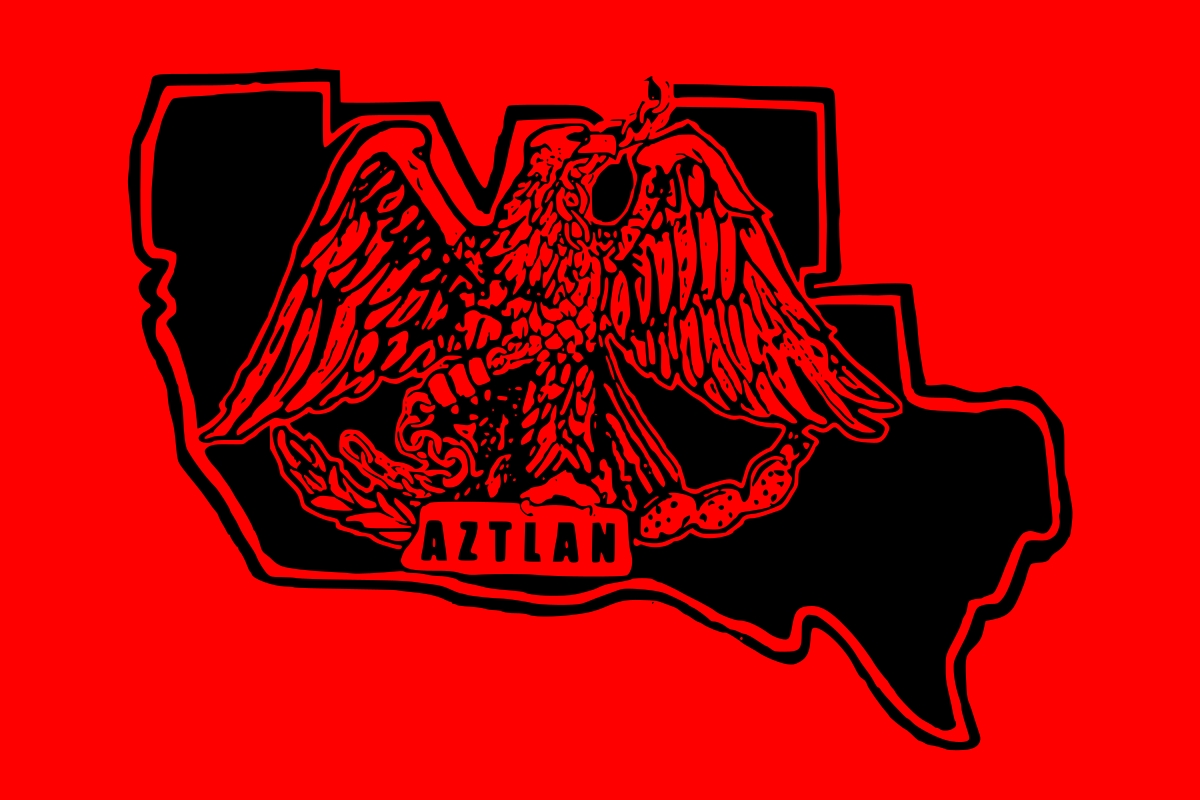

Partido Nacional de La Raza Unida (LRUP; National United Peoples Party or United Race Party) was a Hispanic political party centered on Chicano (Mexican-American) nationalism. It was created in 1970 and became prominent throughout Texas and Southern California. It was started to combat growing inequality and dissatisfaction with the Democratic Party that was typically supported by Mexican-American voters. After its establishment in Texas, the party launched electoral campaigns in Colorado, Arizona, New Mexico, and California, though it only secured official party status for statewide races in Texas. It did poorly in the 1978 Texas elections and dissolved when leaders and members dropped out.

La Raza, as it was usually known, experienced most of its success at the local level in southwest Texas when the party swept city council, school board, and mayoralty elections in Crystal City, Cotulla, and Carrizo Springs. Much of the success was attributed to aggressive grassroots organizing that was concentrated in cities with the lowest income and education levels.

== Platform ==
The Raza Unida Party stated four main goals in their preamble. They are:

- To uphold equal representation for all people by superseding existing systems
- To construct a new government that benefits the people while fulfilling the needs of the individual
- To dismantle the exploitation of future generations by “ending causes of poverty, misery, and injustice”
- To understand the need to negate racist practices in order to discontinue “physical and cultural genocidal practices”

The Raza Unida Party's ideology was based on Chicano nationalist ideas and some Marxist ideas. Their local platform in Crystal City supported farmers, students, and the working class. The stances they endorsed included multilingual instruction in school, farm subsidies, regulation of utilities, community-based organization of politics, and an impartial tax system.

In 1974, RUP developed a statewide platform in hopes to enlarge its appeal to voters in Texas. They endorsed an improved allocation of funds in public education, a revision and development of new methods of transportation, and a system that provided quality medical care. RUP also believed in the prosecution of industrial polluters, the conservation of “human and natural resources,” and the creation of resolutions to concerns exclusive to urban communities.

== Founding ==
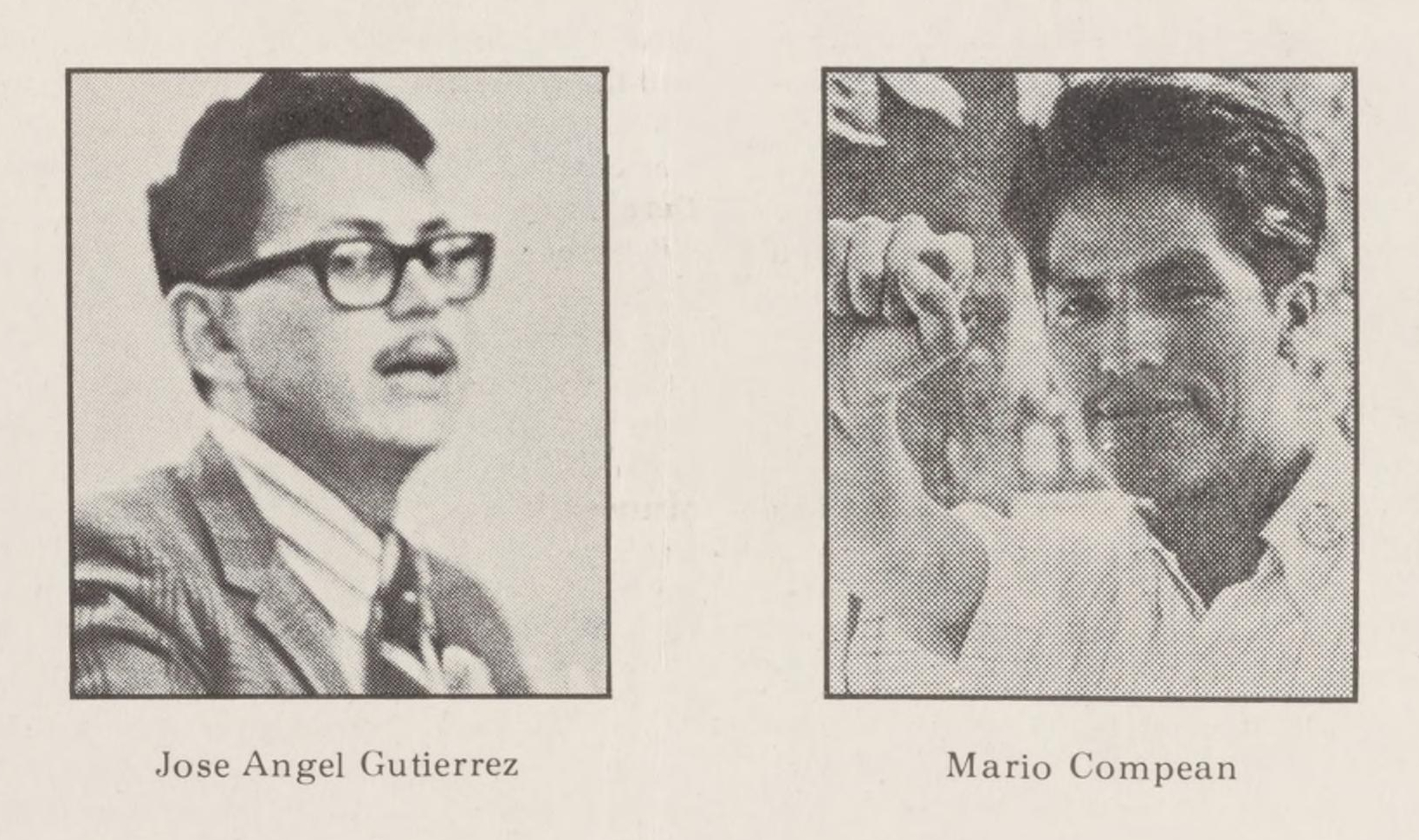
José Ángel Gutiérrez and Mario Compean c. 1970

The Mexican American Youth Organization (MAYO) was begun by five young men studying at St. Mary's University in 1967: Jose Angel Gutierrez, Mario Compean, Willie Velasquez, Ignacio Perez, and Juan Patlan. Jose Angel explained "All of us were the products of the traditional Mexican American organizations … All of us were very frustrated at the lack of political efficacy, at the lack of any broad based movement, and at the lack of expertise". Inspired by the Civil rights movement and by leaders like Martin Luther King Jr. and black nationalists like Malcolm X, they reached the conclusion that the actions being taken by the leaders of the Chicano Movement were not doing enough to get results. They decided that they would halt the current approach being utilized by groups like LULAC and the American G. I. Forum, "which by the 1960s relied on litigation and support from sympathetic Anglos to achieve their goals". The five men decided that their new tactics would be much more confrontational, utilizing civil disobedience tactics used in the Civil rights movement. They decided to incorporate Saul Alinsky's model of confrontation politics: "And we said that was going to be the strategy[…] use confrontational politics based on information[…] well researched, but also foregoing the use of nice language". MAYO became dedicated to creating meaningful social change by relying on abrasing confrontational (but nonviolent) measures. They protested, picketed, and spread their message through newspapers like El Deguello, El Azteca, and La Revolucion. Their tactics earned them criticisms from both white and Mexican American political figures who felt that they were being too abrasive in their tactics. Jose Angel became targeted especially after comments he made where he called to "eliminate the gringo". While he elaborated to say that by gringo he meant "a person or institution that has a certain policy or program, or attitudes that reflect bigotry, racism, discord, prejudice, and violence", the damage was done. Despite attacks on all sides, MAYO continued to organize protests and boycotts, which is what ultimately led them to Crystal City.

The La Raza Unida Party started with simultaneous efforts throughout the U.S. Southwest. The most widely known and accepted story is that the La Raza Unida Party was established on January 17, 1970, at a meeting of some 300 Mexican-Americans in Crystal City, Texas by José Ángel Gutiérrez and Mario Compean, who had also helped in the foundation of the Mexican American Youth Organization (MAYO) in 1967. In Lubbock, the youth organization was headed by the journalist Bidal Aguero, who later worked in the RUP. The party originated from the group Workmen of the World (WOW). Its original 13 members included Alfredo Zamora Jr., the first Chicano mayor of Cotulla, Texas, who unseated a member of the Cotulla family. A second Hispanic mayor followed, Arcenio A. Garcia, who was 24 at the time of his election, the youngest mayor then in Texas. Zamora left LaSalle County within two years and the next election in 1972 was won by Garcia under the RUP. Previously in December 1969, at the only national MAYO meeting, Chicano activists decided to form that third party, Raza Unida. This new party would focus on improving the economic, social and political aspects of the Chicano community throughout Texas. This party resulted in the election of the first two Mexican American Mayors in LaSalle County.

After the victory of the RUP in municipal elections in Crystal City and Cotulla, the party grew and expanded to other states, especially California and Colorado. In Colorado, the RUP worked closely with Rodolfo "Corky" Gonzales and the Crusade For Justice based out of Denver. In California, the RUP spread throughout the state and held strong ground in Los Angeles County, with as many as 20 chapters at one point.

The novice city council was not very effective in implementing its goals and damaged the party's reputation in the short term. However, RUP ran candidates for governor of Texas, Ramsey Muniz in 1972 and 1974 and Mario Compean of San Antonio in 1978. They petitioned the conservative Dr. Hector P. Garcia to run on the RUP ticket, but he declined. In 1972, they ran a candidate, Secundion Salazar, in a competitive U. S. Senate race in Colorado. Salazar received 1.4% of the vote, as victory went to the Democrat Floyd Haskell.

== 1972 Texas elections ==
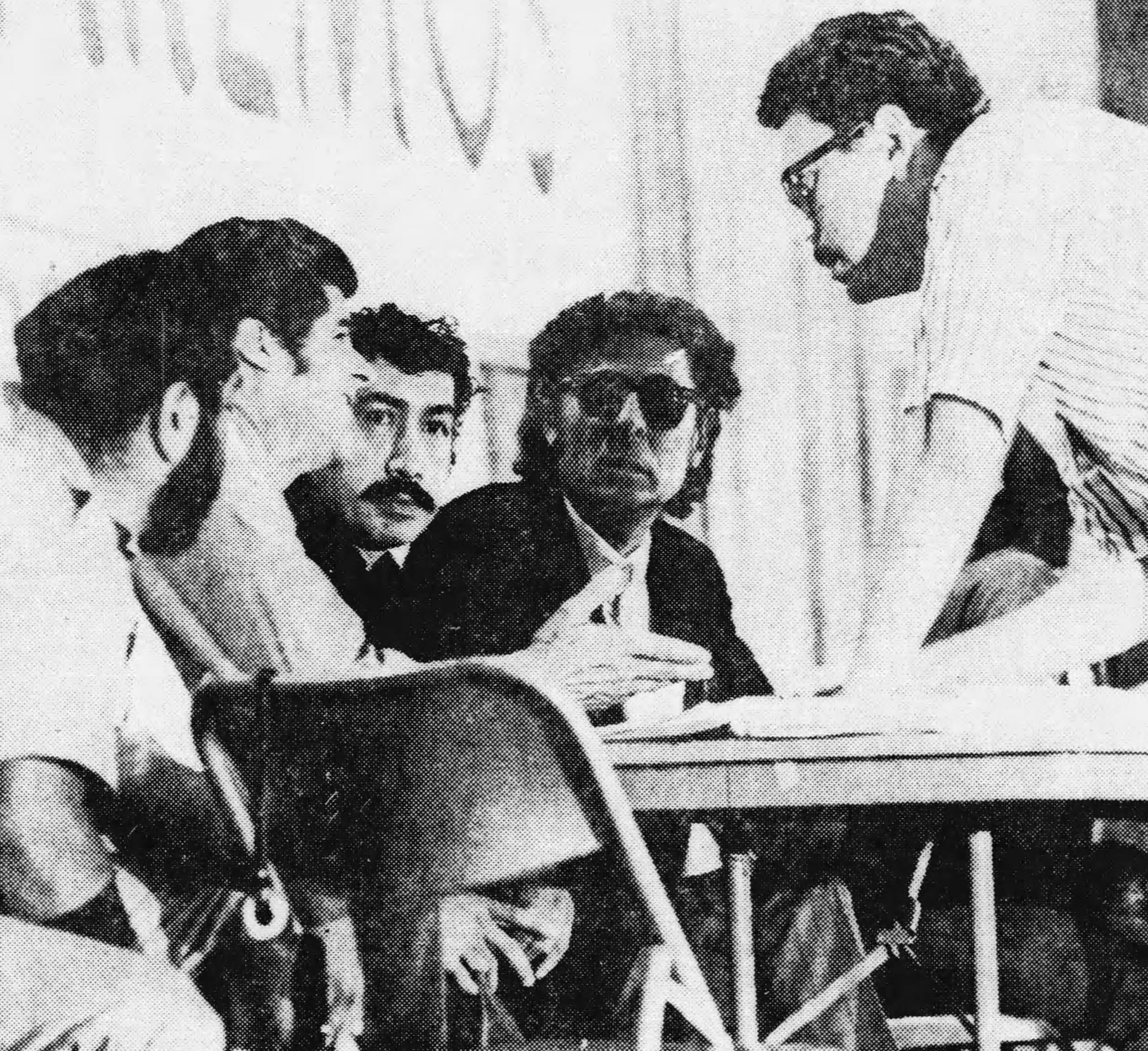
Three of the "Big Four" of the Chicano movement at the party's 1972 convention: Reies Lopez Tijerina, New Mexico (second from left), Rodolfo "Corky" Gonzales, Colorado (center), and José Ángel Gutiérrez, Texas (far right). Cesar Chavez, California, did not attend.

After initial successes where Chicanos were elected in the South Texas counties of Dimmit, La Salle, and Zavala, La Raza Unida Party decided to be more ambitious for the 1972 gubernatorial elections. Its campaign was extremely controversial because it was entirely racially based. The party leaders believed that change could only occur by appealing to the cultural and familial values shared by Mexican Americans. They also asserted that racism against Mexican Americans was so prolific that the entire political system would have to be reevaluated. Mario Compean, past spokesperson for La Raza Unida, said "Ours was a message of liberation from […] a corrupt political system anchored on the twin pillars of racism and discrimination, on the one hand, and social subordination imposed by capitalism on the other". The candidate endorsed by RUP was an ex-Baylor football-player-turned-lawyer named Ramsey Muñiz. He was, at the time, a political unknown, who had been involved with MAYO since 1968 but not distinguished himself.

Muñiz ran an aggressive campaign, "everywhere he went he hammered away at both parties, although the Democrats, who controlled the state legislature and the governor's mansion, received the brunt of the criticism". In a speech at Del Mar College in Corpus Christi, he said,

Ya basta. Raza Unida offers the people an alternative and the days of being led to the polls to vote straight ticket for these two other parties are over… if it is not done this year, it will come next year or the next… as long as there are Mexican Americans there will be persons to replace people like me"

Muñiz ran on a campaign devoted to improving education in Texas, developing multilingual and multicultural curriculums, equal funding for all school districts, for local school boards to proportionately reflect their communities, free early childhood education, and a number of other services. Despite his immense popularity and recognition in the state as one of the leading Mexican-American political figures, his fellow RUP candidates did not attain the same level of popularity. Despite obstacles, Muñiz campaigned tirelessly both in the state and outside – targeting areas with high numbers of migrant workers from Texas. Similar to campaigns run previously in Crystal City, La Raza Unida distributed massive amounts of buttons, stickers, and posters along with holding huge vote drives on election day in the barrios.

Ramsay Muñiz lost his bid for governor in the 1972 elections. He got 6.28% of the vote, Democrat Dolph Briscoe got 47.8%, and Republican Henry Grover got 45.08%. An estimated 18% of Mexican Americans who voted in the election voted for Ramsay Muñiz. He received very high voting rates in rural cities and counties with lower incomes[xiv]. He received 51% of the vote in Brooks County and 46% in Jim Hogg County. In the 15 Mexican American counties, he received 30,020 votes compared to Grover's 31,641, and the winning Democrat, Dolph Briscoe, who got 60,697 votes. While it lost the gubernatorial election, RUP won 15 local offices in several borderland counties: La Salle, Dimmit, Zavala, and Hidalgo. Despite this success in the 1972 election, it could not be replicated at the state level again. However, several counties in South Texas continued to see candidates elected by LRUP for years after the 1972 election, until 1978, when the party broke apart.

Political scientists have examined the 1972 gubernatorial race when RUP called for ethnic solidarity. There was deep alienation among Mexican Americans from Anglo-dominated politics. However, Mexican American support for RUP was uneven across Texas and reflected differing levels of economic attainment and incorporation.

== Electoral results ==
=== Gubernatorial ===
Year	Nominee	Votes	Percent
1972	Ramsey Muñiz	214,118	6.3%
1974	Ramsey Muñiz	93,295	5.6%
1978	Mario Compeán	14,213	0.6%

=== Class II Senate ===
Year	Nominee	Votes	Percent
1972	Flores Amaya	63,543	1.86%
1978	Luis Diaz de Leon	17,869	0.77%

=== U.S. House ===
Year	Seats Contested	Votes	Percent
1976	1	2,515	0.07%
1978	1	7,185	0.33%

== Women's involvement ==
Women played a growing role in the party in Texas in the 1970s, holding party offices at various levels and running as political candidates, as well as doing campaign work in many localities. Women wanted to become involved in the decision-making process in LRUP. Founding party member, Luz Gutierrez wanted to be involved in the political organization of the party. In an interview, she said,

[Women] actually had a walk-in to one of their meetings and said… “We really want to be part of the decision-making process." At that time, half the men broke off of Raza Unida, and they said they didn’t want to be a part of it if women were gonna be involved.

Women in RUP were not respected or recognized on the same level that the men were. Some believed it was “dangerous” for women to be further involved in the party. After the formation of Mujeres Por La Raza, some factions of LRUP did focus on challenging machismo and patriarchal practices within the party and society.

=== Mujeres Por La Raza ===
Mujeres Por La Raza is a women's caucus associated with the Raza Unida Party which developed in 1973. Its creation has been credited to three women: Evey Chapa, Ino Alvárez, and Marta Cotera. Mujeres Por La Raza was conceived in conjunction with the Chicana feminist movement of the 1970s. Many women were involved in the RUP since its creation in 1969. Regardless of their participation in the movement, women were sometimes referred to as “groupies” by men in the party.

Mujeres Por La Raza focused primarily on women and family life. They held many conferences with seminars that focused on community building and political organization. Mujeres Por La Raza had many local communities based in cities such as Houston, Dallas, Corpus Christi, Laredo, San Antonio, Crystal City, Mercedes, Austin, and Temple. Alma Canales, a member of the organization, received the endorsement from the Texas Women's Political Caucus (TWPC) on her 1972 campaign for lieutenant governor. However, the TWPC failed to commit on Canales's political campaign. A year later, Mujeres Por La Raza unanimously voted to remove themselves from the TWPC.

== Crystal City indictments ==
In 1976, 11 officials in Crystal City, Texas, were indicted on various counts. Angel Noe Gonzalez, the former Crystal City Independent School District superintendent who later worked in the United States Department of Education in Washington, D.C., upon his indictment retained the San Antonio lawyer and later mayor, Phil Hardberger. Gonzalez was charged with paying Adan Cantu for doing no work. However, Hardberger documented to the court specific duties that Cantu had performed and disputed all the witnesses called against Cantu. The jury acquitted Gonzalez. Many newspapers reported on the indictments but not on the acquittal. John Luke Hill, the 1978 Democratic gubernatorial nominee, had sought to weaken RUP so that he would not lose general election votes to a third-party candidate. However Victory went to his Republican rival, Bill Clements. Compean received only 15,000 votes, or 0.6%, just under Clements's 17,000-vote plurality over Hill.

== Final years ==
During the late 1970s, La Raza Unida Party decided to change tactics from a "get out the vote" organization to a more community-based, grassroots, revolutionary nationalist format seeking the unity of all Chicanos, other Latinos, and Native Americans in the American Southwest, commonly called Aztlán. Xenaro Ayala was voted in as the national party chairman in 1978. The party held a second national convention in which Juan Jose Pena was elected chairman in 1980. By the year 1974, Crystal City was the only city La Raza Unida Party still had political power in. In 1976, Ramsey Muniz pled guilty to one count of drug charges. He was apprehended and convicted to 15 years in prison. Mario Compean's 1978 gubernatorial campaign ended poorly, with only 15,000 votes in his favor. After these events, morale in RUP decreased. On election day in 1978, RUP was eliminated as a political party and lost its state funding. By 1981, the Democratic and Republican parties banned RUP from its ballot status.

Texas Gubernatorial Election Results by County, 1974 Raza Unida

== Legacy ==
The Raza Unida Party left many contributions to the political structure of the state of Texas. Some argue that this impact is also felt at a national level. Since the 1970s, RUP allowed Mexican Americans who are interested in politics to be involved in them. Chicano politicians who continued their political careers after the disbanding of RUP learned how to organize politically during the active years of the party. RUP established a Chicano platform within American politics from the local level to the national level. Some members of RUP were able to train as “election clerks, voter registrars, poll watchers, candidates, precinct chairs, and organizers.” The Raza Unida Party also allowed for over 2 million Latinos to register vote in the next 20 years. In that same time span, there would approximately be “5000 Latino elected officials in the United States.”

The Raza Unida Party allowed for the affirmation of Chicano rights throughout the 1970s. Some historians argue that RUP's creation in the 1970s was at the “right moment in Mexican-American history.” A reunion conference commemorating the 40th anniversary of the party was held from July 6 to 7, 2012, in the capital city of Austin. According to an organizer, the aging former members of the party wanted to get together for "el ultimo adios," or "one final goodbye". Attendees included José Ángel Gutiérrez and Mario Compean.

== Notable members ==
- Carmen Roybal Arteaga, activist
- Herman Baca (1943–present), activist
- Alma Canales (1947–present), candidate for lieutenant governor of Texas (1972)
- Eddie Canales (1948–2024), labor organizer
- Rosie Castro (1947–present), candidate for San Antonio City Council (1971) and mother of Democratic politicians Joaquin and Julian Castro
- Martha P. Cotera (1938–present), candidate for Texas State Board of Education (1972)
- Ricardo Cruz (1943–1993), activist and attorney
- Maria L. de Hernández (1896–1986), Mexican-American rights activist
- Deborah Mora Espinosa (1951–present), activist
- Ricardo Falcón (1945–1972), activist
- Rodolfo Gonzales (1928–2005), boxer, poet, political organizer, and activist
- Raúl Grijalva (1948–2025), Democratic representative in Congress from Arizona (2003–2025)
- Albert Gurule (1944–present), candidate for governor of Colorado (1970)
- José Ángel Gutiérrez (1944–present), co-founder, Zavala County Judge (1974–1981)
- Maria Martin (1951–2023), journalist
- José Montalvo (1946–1994), candidate for Texas House of Representatives (1974)
- Ramsey Muñiz (1942–2022), candidate for governor of Texas (1972, 1974)
- Aurora Estrada Orozco (1918–2011), activist
- Raul Ruiz (1940–2019), candidate for California State Assembly (1971, 1972)
- Manuela Solis Sager (1912–1996), labor organizer
- Martín Serna (1944–1978), candidate for Congress (1970)
- Reies Tijerina (1926–2015), activist
- Willie Velasquez (1944–1988), co-founder

== See also ==
- People's Constitutional Party
