= Los Seis de Boulder =

Chicano activists killed in Colorado car bombings

Los Seis de Boulder (transl. The Boulder Six) were six Chicano activists and students killed in two car bombings in Boulder, Colorado. The bombings occurred at the end of May 1974, with the name Los Seis de Boulder coined posthumously. The students were protesting the negative treatment of Mexican-American students at the University of Colorado (CU) Boulder at the time of their death. Memorials to the bombing victims have been installed on the University of Colorado campus and in Chautauqua Park.

== Involvement of Los Seis in student groups ==
Los Seis were active in the UMAS (United Mexican American Students) at the University of Colorado Boulder. At the time [1967-1979], Colorado was one of fewer than 10 U.S. states in which Chicanos (mid-20th century political/cultural term used by some Mexican Americans) were initiating the original MECha groups. As of 2012, there are over 500 chapters. Although these groups originally concentrated more on education issues, this led to participation in political campaigns and protests against widespread issues such as police brutality and the U.S. war in Southeast Asia. Outside of Colorado, the Brown Berets, a Chicano youth group which began in California, took on a more militant and nationalistic ideology. At the University of Colorado Boulder today, UMAS and MEChA have combined into a single coalition simply referred to as "UMAS y MEXA".

== Prior to the car bombings ==
The University of Maryland's Global Terrorism Database has information on other bombings in Boulder in 1974 suspected to involve the same "Chicano activists," and states that "The explosions came during a time of racial tensions in Colorado, especially in Denver and Boulder, where at least 10 bombings had occurred within the last year, primarily directed at public buildings such as schools, police stations, and courthouses." In March 1974, two months prior to the deaths of "Los Seis", a Boulder police station was bombed. There were no casualties, though $8,000 worth of damage was caused. Minutes later on the same day, the courthouse was bombed.

== Car bombings ==
=== First ===
In an article written for the Daily Camera, librarian and local historian Carol Taylor states that the first bombing took place on May 27, 1974, and

The blast on May 27, at Chautauqua Park, was heard all over Boulder. The three who died in the bombed car were Alamosa attorney and CU law school graduate Reyes Martinez, 26; Ignacio high school homecoming queen and CU junior Neva Romero, 21; and CU double major graduate Una Jaakola, 24, Martinez's girlfriend.

— Carol Taylor on History: 'Los Seis de Boulder' died in '74 car bombings,

=== Second ===
Then, on May 29, another bomb went off in a car in the Burger King parking lot on 28th Street, killing Florencio Granado, 31, who once attended CU; former CU student Heriberto Teran, 24; and Francisco Dougherty, 20, a pre-med student from Texas. One survivor, who was outside of the car at the time, lost a leg and suffered severe burns.

— Carol Taylor on History: 'Los Seis de Boulder' died in '74 car bombings,

=== Investigation ===
Due to the politicized nature of the activists work as members of UMAS and MEChA, focusing on fighting for Mexican American student rights at the University of Colorado Boulder as well as other institutions of higher education throughout the state, conspiratorial foul play has also been suspected as claimed by some involved in the Chicano community at that time.

The crimes have not yet been solved. The FBI and police found that the students themselves triggered bombs they were making to assault civic buildings and personnel. The active COINTELPRO program was a major factor in speculation of government involvement. Priscilla Falcon, professor of Hispanic Studies at the University of Northern Colorado, said in relation to the deaths of Los Seis “After that, many people became fearful that they could be the next target of the government,” and “So there were peaks and valleys in the movement. If you’re looking at the activism among the student population, I would definitely say that a peak was 1970, with the Chicano Moratorium in California, where 3,000 folks came, and after that I think we entered into a repressive period where there was a lot of COINTELPRO stuff going on.”

== In art and media ==
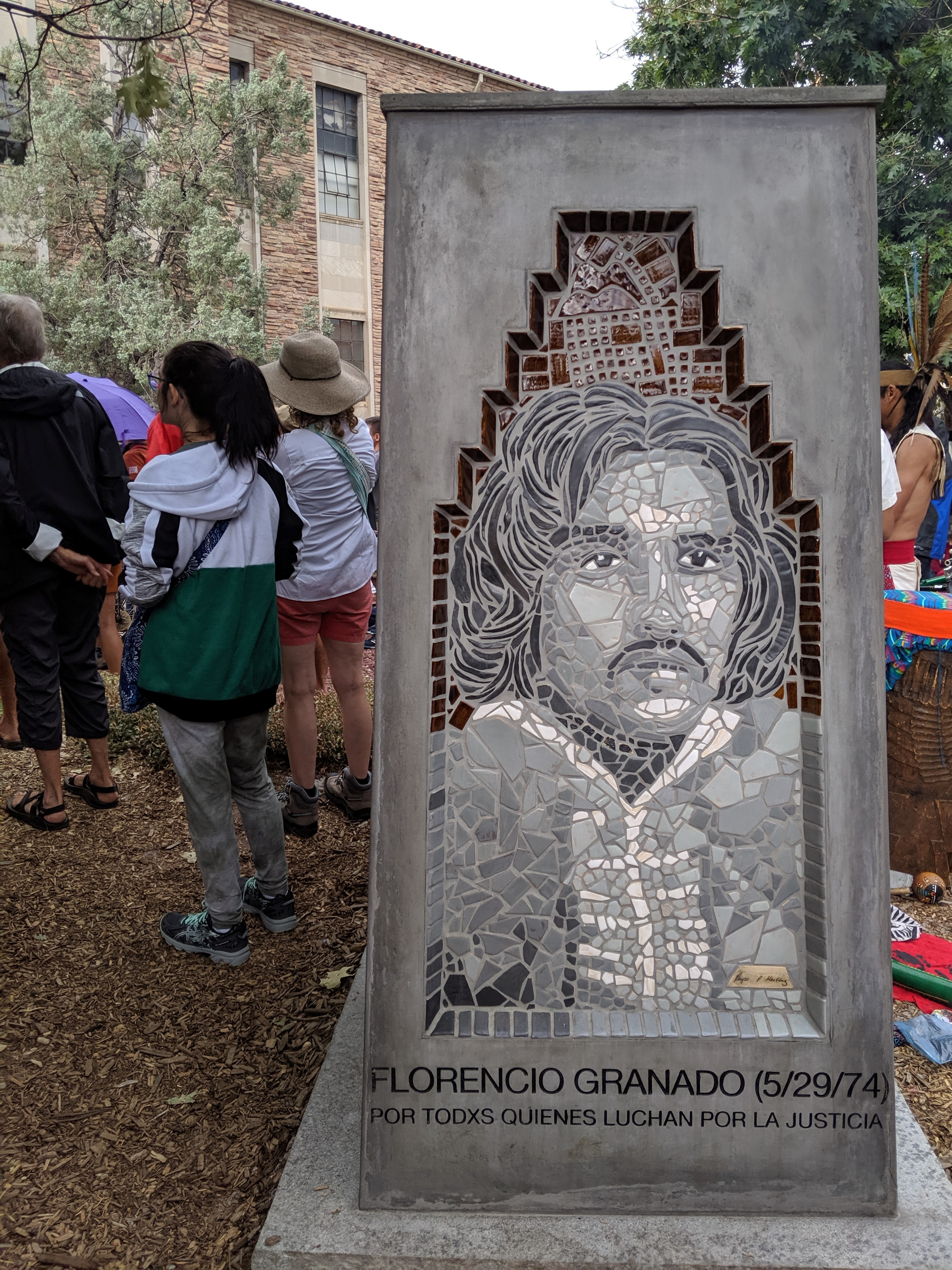
Los Seis de Boulder Memorial Sculpture on the University of Colorado Boulder campus.

Documentary films and live performances have featured the subject, including 2014's Symbols of Resistance and a 2017 entirely dedicated to the subject, "Neva Romero: Jamas Olvidados" by director Nicole Esquibel.

On May 31, 2014, Su Teatro, located in Denver's Art District on Santa Fe, which on its website claims it "has established a national reputation for homegrown productions that speak to the history and experience of Chicanos.", rented its theater to a coalition of groups and persons who organized and sponsored a 40th anniversary event commemorating the death of Los Seis.

"Los Seis de Boulder," a community-created sculpture designed by CU alumna Jasmine Baetz, was installed on campus in 2019. Baetz was assisted by three University of Colorado students (Gladys Preciado, Celina Jara Tovar, Lupe Avalos) and Community College of Denver student Ciprie Ramos.

CU students protested a campus decision not to make the art exhibit permanent. On September 16, 2020, CU officials announced that the sculpture would be made permanent as part of its library's Special Collections, Archives and Preservation department. Baetz described the decision as a good first step toward addressing equity issues facing Chicano, Latino and students of color at CU.

On April 25, 2025, the University of Colorado School of Law and the University of Colorado School of Education BUENO Center hosted an event "Homenaje al Lic. Reyes P. Martinez." Martinez was a 1973 CU Law graduate. The event marked the 51st anniversary of the deaths of Los Seis de Boulder+1. The +1 stands for Antonio Alcantar who died several years later from life-shortening injuries he suffered in the second of two May 1974 Boulder automobile explosions. The event was held before a full house composed Martinez's peers, his community, his family and a handful of Mexican dignitaries. The University of Colorado Los Seis de Boulder Endowed Scholarship was one focus of the event. A panel discussion highlighted the success of the Chicano Movement while also rallying support for immigrants and against Trump-era policies and practices. Big-money donors to CU Law have places named after them in the new law school building including the Judge's Chambers named after the disgraced chief judge of the Colorado federal district court, Fred Winner, who was forced to resign in 1981 after secretly meeting with the prosecution in the trial of Francisco "Kiko" Martinez. Winner secretly met with the prosecution in an effort to fabricate "a major obstruction of justice prosecution." In Winner's words, "We can get them all." See: La Cucaracha News online, May 3, 2025.
