= Shimon Prokupecz =

American journalist (born 1978)

- Born: February 4, 1978 (age 48)
- Education: Hunter College (B.A.)
- Occupation: Journalist

Shimon Prokupecz (born February 4, 1978) is an American journalist who works as the Senior Crime and Justice Correspondent for CNN.

== Life and career ==
Prokupecz immigrated from Russia as a child and was raised in Brooklyn, New York. He is a graduate of Hunter College. After school, he worked as a paralegal in the office of the Brooklyn District Attorney before working as an assignment editor at WABC-TV and then as a producer at WNBC.

In 2013, he joined CNN as their crime and justice producer based in Washington, D.C., and later New York City. In 2017, he returned to Washington, D.C., as a crime and justice reporter. Starting in May 2022, he has been covering the Robb Elementary School shooting in Texas, including the related first responder attack timeline controversy. In June 2022, Prokupecz had an altercation with Uvalde Independent School District Police Chief Pedro Arredondo over his decision to tell police officers to hold off on breaching the classroom where the perpetrator of the shooting killed all his victims. Prokupecz was threatened with charges of trespassing if he and his news crew did not leave the offices of the Uvalde school district where the altercation took place.

Prokupecz speaks Russian.

=== Accolades ===
Year	Award	Category	Nominee(s)	Result	Ref.
2022	Peabody Awards	News	Shimon Prokupecz: Unraveling Uvalde	Won	
