= Batesville, Texas =

- CDP
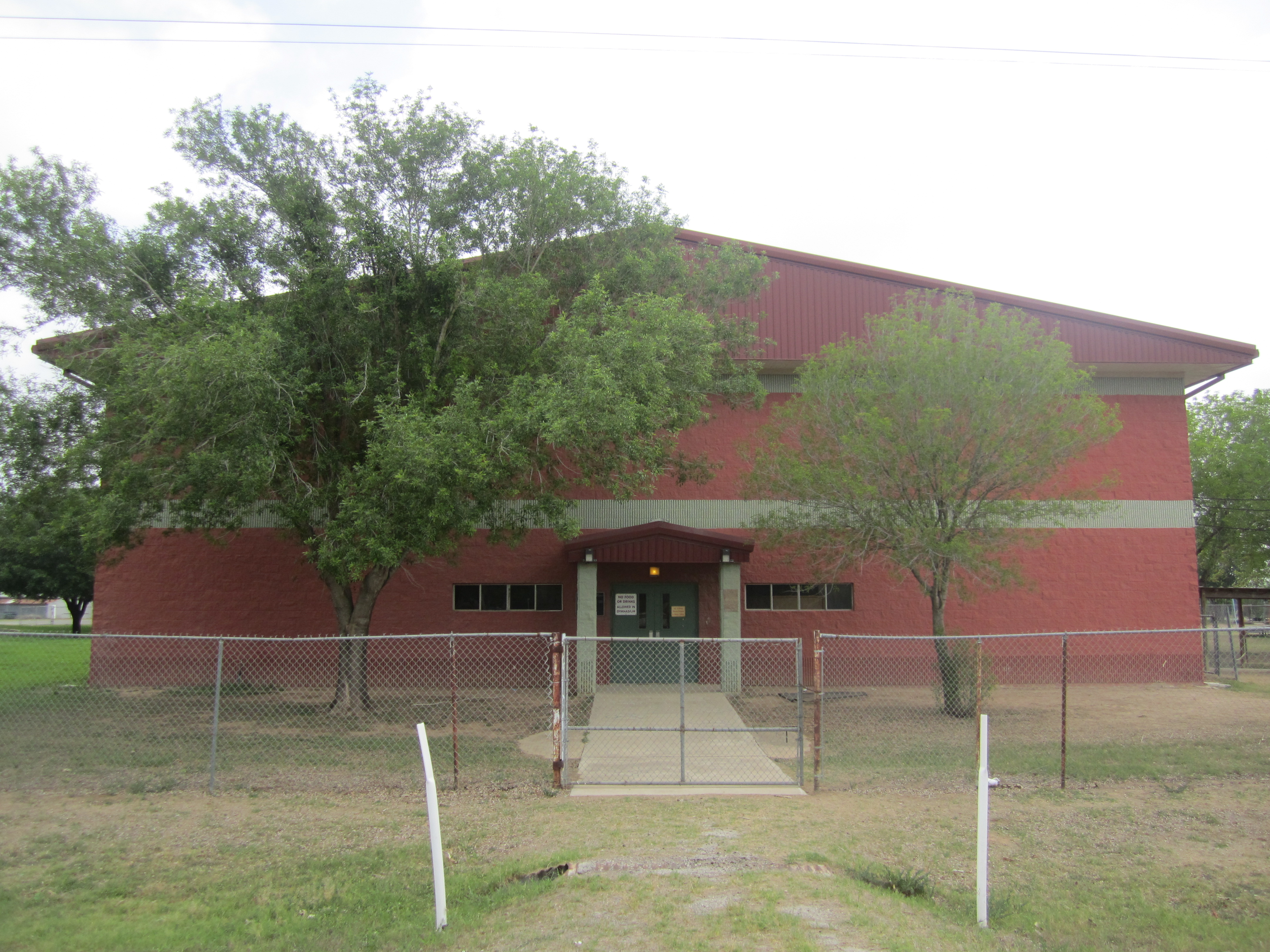
- Batesville School

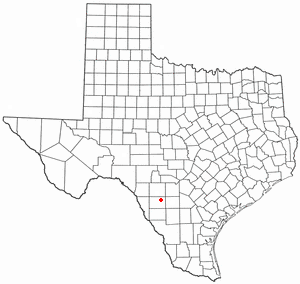
- Location of Batesville, Texas

- Coordinates: 28°57′9″N 99°37′46″W
- Country: United States
- State: Texas
- County: Zavala

Area
  - Total: 5.9 sq mi (15 km^{2})
  - Land: 5.9 sq mi (15 km^{2})
  - Water: 0.0 sq mi (0 km^{2})
- Elevation: 705 ft (215 m)

Population (2020)
  - Total: 787
  - Density: 130/sq mi (52/km^{2})
- Time zone: UTC-6 (Central (CST))
  - Summer (DST): UTC-5 (CDT)
- ZIP code: 78829
- Area code: 830
- FIPS code: 48-05924
- GNIS feature ID: 1351592

Batesville is a census-designated place (CDP) in Zavala County, Texas, United States. As of the 2020 census, Batesville had a population of 787.

== Geography ==
Batesville is located at 28°57′9″N 99°37′46″W (28.952424, -99.629311). The CDP had a total area of 11.6 square miles (30.0 km^{2}), all land. Prior to the 2010 census, the CDP lost area, reducing its total area to 5.9 square miles (15 km^{2}), all land, as before.

== Demographics ==
Historical population
Census	Pop.	Note	%±
1990	1,313		—
2000	1,298		−1.1%
2010	1,068		−17.7%
2020	787		−26.3%
U.S. Decennial Census; 1850–1900 1910; 1920 1930 1940; 1950 1960 1970; 1980 1990 2000; 2010 2020

Batesville first appeared as a census designated place in the 1990 U.S. census.

=== 2020 census ===
Batesville CDP, Texas – Racial and ethnic composition Note: the US Census treats Hispanic/Latino as an ethnic category. This table excludes Latinos from the racial categories and assigns them to a separate category. Hispanics/Latinos may be of any race.
Race / Ethnicity (NH = Non-Hispanic)	Pop 2000	Pop 2010	Pop 2020	% 2000	% 2010	% 2020
White alone (NH)	107	48	71	8.24%	4.49%	9.02%
Black or African American alone (NH)	0	0	0	0.00%	0.00%	0.00%
Native American or Alaska Native alone (NH)	1	0	0	0.08%	0.00%	0.00%
Asian alone (NH)	0	0	4	0.00%	0.00%	0.51%
Native Hawaiian or Pacific Islander alone (NH)	0	0	0	0.00%	0.00%	0.00%
Other race alone (NH)	1	0	0	0.08%	0.00%	0.00%
Mixed race or Multiracial (NH)	3	2	6	0.23%	0.19%	0.76%
Hispanic or Latino (any race)	1,186	1,018	706	91.37%	95.32%	89.71%
Total	1,298	1,068	787	100.00%	100.00%	100.00%

As of the 2020 United States census, there were 787 people, 323 households, and 255 families residing in the CDP.

=== 2000 Census ===
As of the census of 2000, there were 1,298 people, 370 households, and 318 families residing in the CDP. The population density was 112.1 inhabitants per square mile (43.3/km^{2}). There were 456 housing units at an average density of 39.4 per square mile (15.2/km^{2}). The racial makeup of the CDP was 50.15% White, 0.08% African American, 0.92% Native American, 45.30% from other races, and 3.54% from two or more races. Hispanic or Latino of any race were 91.37% of the population.

There were 370 households, out of which 45.7% had children under the age of 18 living with them, 55.9% were married couples living together, 22.2% had a female householder with no husband present, and 13.8% were non-families. 11.9% of all households were made up of individuals, and 4.6% had someone living alone who was 65 years of age or older. The average household size was 3.51 and the average family size was 3.80.

In the CDP, the population was spread out, with 35.0% under the age of 18, 11.0% from 18 to 24, 27.1% from 25 to 44, 19.1% from 45 to 64, and 7.8% who were 65 years of age or older. The median age was 28 years. For every 100 females, there were 97.9 males. For every 100 females age 18 and over, there were 94.0 males.

The median income for a household in the CDP was $17,448, and the median income for a family was $18,571. Males had a median income of $18,548 versus $13,333 for females. The per capita income for the CDP was $6,969. About 33.3% of families and 43.3% of the population were below the poverty line, including 52.6% of those under age 18 and 62.4% of those age 65 or over.

== Education ==
Batesville is served by the Uvalde Consolidated Independent School District. Residents attend the Batesville School (grades K-6), Morales Junior High School in Uvalde, and Uvalde High School.

The first school in Batesville opened in 1884. Originally students attended Batesville High School but in 1949 they began attending high school in Uvalde. The Batesville school district consolidated with Uvalde's in 1973.

== Notable person ==
- Tracy King, Texas state representative from District 80
