= Brooks Raley =

American baseball player (born 1988)

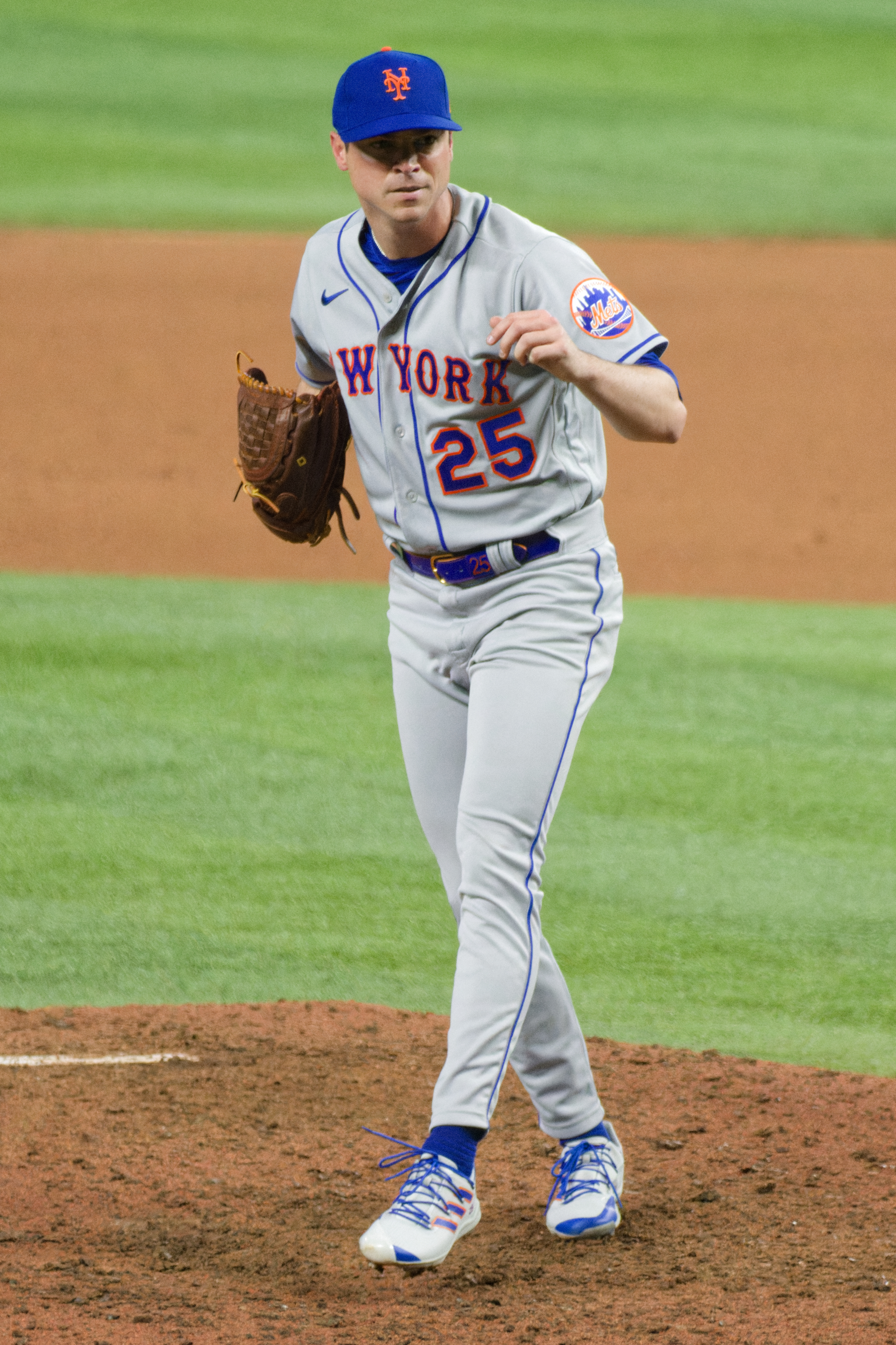
- Raley with the Mets in 2023

Free agent
- Pitcher
- Born: June 29, 1988 (age 38); San Antonio, Texas, U.S.
- Bats: Left Throws: Left

Professional debut
- MLB: August 7, 2012, for the Chicago Cubs
- KBO: March 28, 2015, for the Lotte Giants

MLB statistics (through 2026 season)
- Win–loss record: 14–18
- Earned run average: 3.77
- Strikeouts: 329

KBO statistics (through 2019 season)
- Win–loss record: 48–53
- Earned run average: 4.13
- Strikeouts: 755
- Stats at Baseball Reference

Teams
- Chicago Cubs (2012–2013); Lotte Giants (2015–2019); Cincinnati Reds (2020); Houston Astros (2020–2021); Tampa Bay Rays (2022); New York Mets (2023–2026); Philadelphia Phillies (2026)
Medals
Men's baseball
Representing United States
World Baseball Classic
Silver medal – second place	2023 Miami	Team

Brooks Lee Raley (born June 29, 1988) is an American professional baseball pitcher who is a free agent. He has played in Major League Baseball (MLB) for the Chicago Cubs, Cincinnati Reds, Houston Astros, Tampa Bay Rays, New York Mets, and Philadelphia Phillies, and in the KBO League for the Lotte Giants. Raley played college baseball for the Texas A&M Aggies. The Cubs selected Raley in the sixth round of the 2009 MLB draft, and he made his MLB debut with them in 2012.

== Career ==
=== Amateur career ===
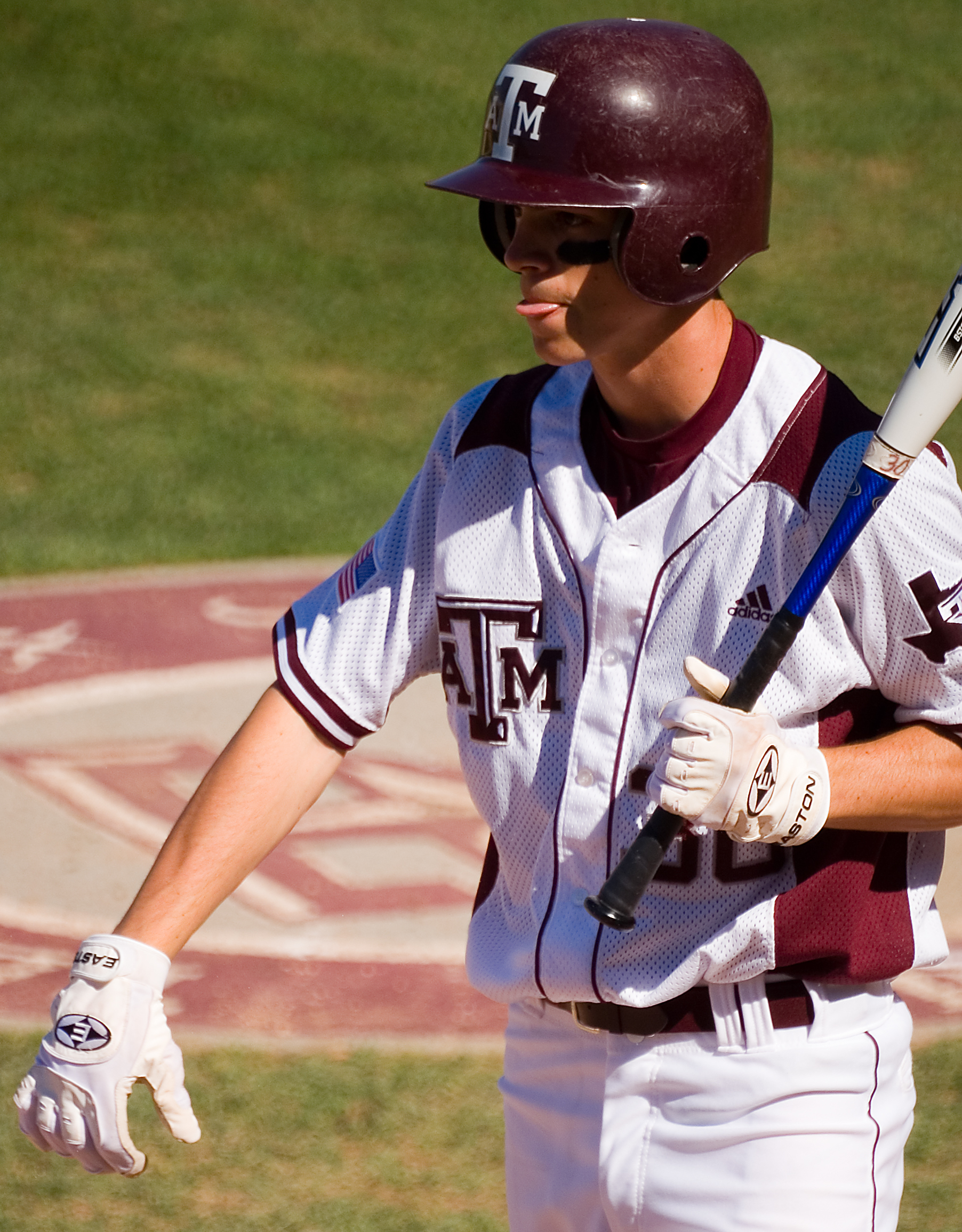
Raley playing for Texas A&M in 2008

Raley attended Uvalde High School in Uvalde, Texas, and Texas A&M University, where he played college baseball for the Texas A&M Aggies.

=== Chicago Cubs ===
The Chicago Cubs drafted Raley in the sixth round, with the 200th overall selection, of the 2009 Major League Baseball draft. He split his first professional season between the rookie-level Arizona League Cubs and Low-A Boise Hawks, posting a combined 0-1 record and 2.53 ERA with five strikeouts across 10 2/3 innings pitched.

Raley spent the 2010 season with the High-A Daytona Cubs, compiling an 8-6 record and 3.50 ERA with 97 strikeouts in 136 1/3 innings pitched across 27 starts. He made 26 appearances (25 starts) for the Double-A Tennessee Smokies in 2011, logging an 8-10 record and 4.22 ERA with 80 strikeouts across 136 1/3 innings pitched.

Raley began the 2012 season with Tennessee, later receiving a promotion to the Triple-A Iowa Cubs. On August 7, 2012, Raley was selected to the 40-man roster and promoted to the major leagues for the first time. He made five starts for Chicago during his rookie campaign, struggling to a 1-2 record and 8.14 ERA with 16 strikeouts across 24 1/3 innings pitched.

Raley spent the majority of the season with the Iowa Cubs of the Triple–A Pacific Coast League. In nine appearances for Chicago, Raley recorded a 5.14 ERA with 14 strikeouts over 14 innings of work.

=== Minnesota Twins ===
On February 12, 2014, Raley was claimed off waivers by the Minnesota Twins. In 8 games for the Triple–A Rochester Red Wings, Raley compiled a 3.68 ERA with 19 strikeouts across 14 2/3 innings pitched.

=== Los Angeles Angels of Anaheim ===
Raley was claimed off waivers by the Los Angeles Angels of Anaheim on May 8, 2014. On June 6, he was removed from the 40–man roster and sent outright to the Triple–A Salt Lake Bees. In 6 games (5 starts) for the Bees, Raley struggled to an 0–3 record and 10.57 ERA with 15 strikeouts across 23 innings pitched. He was released by the Angels organization on December 15.

=== Lotte Giants ===
On December 14, 2014, Raley signed a contract with the Lotte Giants, a team in the KBO League based in Busan. Raley remained with the Giants in 2016, and signed a one-year, $850,000 contract for the 2017 season on January 8, 2017. In five seasons with Lotte from 2015 through 2019, Raley produced a 48–53 record with a 4.13 ERA and 755 strikeouts over 910 2/3 innings.

=== Cincinnati Reds ===
On January 9, 2020, Raley signed a minor league contract with the Cincinnati Reds that included an invitation to spring training. He made the Reds' Opening Day roster. Raley pitched in four innings in four games for Cincinnati, marking his first MLB action since 2013 before being designated for assignment on August 6.

=== Houston Astros ===
On August 9, 2020, Raley was traded to the Houston Astros in exchange for a player to be named later, minor league pitcher Fredy Medina. In 2020 with Houston, Raley was 0–1 with one save and a 3.94 ERA in 16 innings in which he struck out 21 batters, over 17 relief appearances. On November 1, the Astros picked up Raley's $2 million option for the 2021 season.

In 2021, Raley was 2–3 with two saves and a 4.78 ERA. In 58 games he pitched 49.0 innings and struck out 65 batters. On November 3, 2021, Raley was declared a free agent.

=== Tampa Bay Rays ===
On November 30, 2021, Raley signed a two-year, $10 million contract with the Tampa Bay Rays. On June 4, 2022, Raley, along with four other Rays teammates, opted out of wearing a Rays team logo and cap in support of LGBTQ+ Pride, during the team's annual Pride Night celebration at Tropicana Field. In 60 appearances for the Rays, he compiled a 2.68 ERA with 61 strikeouts and 6 saves across 53 2/3 innings pitched.

=== New York Mets ===
On December 7, 2022, the Rays traded Raley to the New York Mets in exchange for Keyshawn Askew. In 2023, Raley made 66 appearances out of the bullpen for New York, compiling a 2.80 ERA with 61 strikeouts and 3 saves across 54 2/3 innings pitched.

Raley made eight scoreless appearances for the Mets in 2024 before going down with an elbow injury. On May 21, 2024, it was announced that Raley would undergo Tommy John surgery. After the season, he became a free agent.

On April 25, 2025, the Mets re-signed Raley to a one-year contract including a team option for 2026. He was transferred to the 60-day injured list on April 30, as he continued to recover from surgery. Raley was activated from the injured list on July 18.

=== Philadelphia Phillies ===
On August 3, 2026, the Mets traded Raley to the Philadelphia Phillies in exchange for Luke Gabrysh and John Spikerman.

== Personal life ==
Raley's parents are Terry and DeeAnna Raley. His father joined the Toronto Blue Jays organization after being selected in the 1981 Major League Baseball draft, and played for the Medicine Hat Blue Jays and the Kinston Blue Jays before ending his professional baseball career in 1982. Two of Raley's brothers have also played minor league baseball. Elder brother Russell was drafted by the New York Yankees in 2006. After his playing career ended in 2007, Russell became a coach. His younger brother Cory was chosen by the Cleveland Indians in 2012, and played his final season of minor league baseball in 2016.

Raley met Rachel Shipley at Texas A&M, where she played for the women's soccer team, and they later married. The couple have four children, three daughters and a son.
