= Uvalde Consolidated Independent School District =

School district in Texas, United States

Address
- 1000 North Getty Street Uvalde, Texas, 78801; United States
- Coordinates: 29.2221°N 99.7925°W

District information
- Superintendent: Hal Harrell
- Chair of the board: Luis Fernandez
- Governing agency: Texas Education Agency
- Schools: 8
- Budget: $46.74 million (2021-2022)
- NCES District ID: 4843720

Students and staff
- Students: 4150 (2020–2021)
- Teachers: 278.92 (on an FTE basis)
- Student–teacher ratio: 14.9 (2020–2021)

Other information
- Website: www.ucisd.net

Uvalde Consolidated Independent School District (UCISD) is a public school district based in Uvalde, Texas, US. Located in Uvalde County, the district extends into portions of Zavala and Real counties. In addition to Uvalde, the district serves the communities of Batesville in Zavala County, and Uvalde Estates in Uvalde County. The total land area of the district is 1,093 square miles (2,830 km^{2}).

On May 24, 2022, 19 students and 2 teachers were killed by a gunman at Robb Elementary School, a school in the UCISD district. The district was rated "academically acceptable" by the Texas Education Agency. The district superintendent is Ashley Chohlis.

== History ==
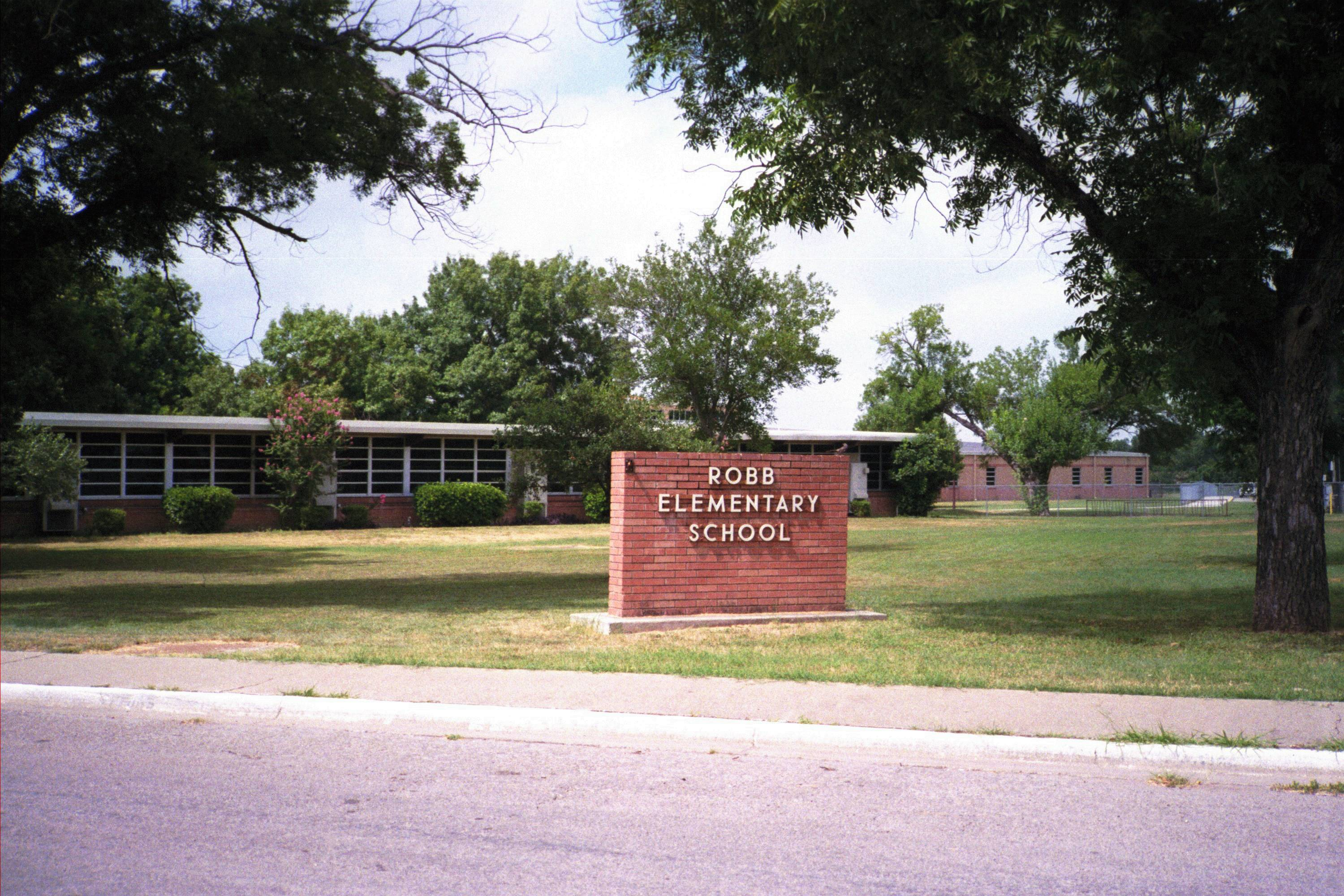
Robb Elementary School in 2015

In 1949, the Batesville Independent School District began sending its students to Uvalde High School.

In 1970, students held a strike and filed a lawsuit against the district's board of trustees, accusing the group of not responding to complaints filed by parents, who requested Spanish-language medium communications and giving appropriate accommodations to English as a second language learners instead of classifying them as having deficiencies in their intelligence. An employee also accused the school board of not hearing grievances.

In 1973, Batesville ISD merged into Uvalde CISD.

=== 2022 school shooting ===
On May 24, 2022, a gunman killed 19 students and two teachers and wounded 17 others at Robb Elementary School. On June 3, 2022, UCISD Superintendent Hal Harrel stated that Robb Elementary School would not be reopened and its building demolished, to avoid renewing traumas related to the shooting.

== Police department ==
The Uvalde Consolidated Independent School District Police Department is the police force with primary jurisdiction over Uvalde CISD property.

In February 2020, the district's Board of Trustees approved Pedro "Pete" Arredondo as new Chief of Police of the UCISD Police Department. As of 2022, Arredondo commanded a team of six officers.

Following the Robb Elementary School shooting on May 24, 2022, the Uvalde Consolidated Independent School District Police Department and other responding agencies were criticized for their responses to the incident.

In early July 2022, Chief of Police Pete Arredondo resigned from his city council position.

On August 24, 2022, the board of the school district fired Arredondo from his job as police chief by unanimous vote.

== List of schools ==
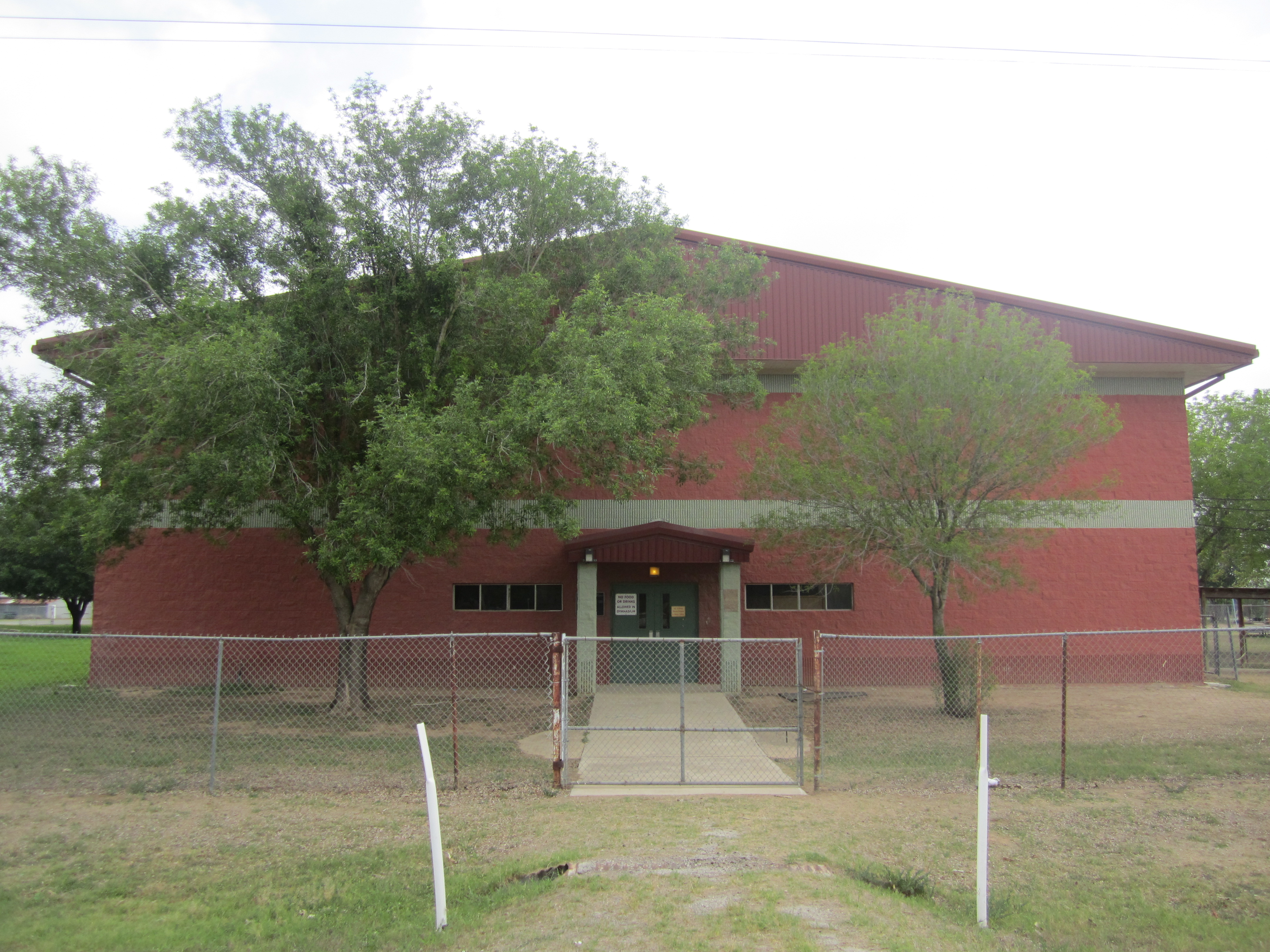
Batesville School

- Dalton Early Childhood Center (PK–2)
  - Historically Dalton School was the school for students of non-Hispanic white backgrounds.
- Uvalde Elementary (Grades 3–4) (former Benson complex)
- Flores Elementary (Grades 5–6)
- Batesville School (PK–7)
- Uvalde Dual Language Academy (Spanish: Academia de Lenguaje Dual de Uvalde, PK–6)
- Morales Junior High School (Grade 7–8)
- Uvalde Early College High School (Grades 9–12)
- Uvalde High School (Grades 9–12)
- Crossroads Academy (Grades 9–12)

In 2023, the district began construction of a new elementary school that is to operate in the place of Robb Elementary. The new school will have a library with a memorial tree that is in honor of the victims of the Robb massacre.

Former schools

- Robb Elementary School (last at Grades 2–4; permanently closed)
  - Historically Robb was a school for students of Mexican origins. However, before the 1970s the principal and almost all of the staff were non-Spanish speakers and were non-Hispanic white. Parents began to protest by withdrawing children from the school, in April 1970, after the school chose not to renew the contract of its only teacher of Mexican origins. By May 2022, because of a flight of non-Hispanic white residents, 90% of the school's students were Hispanic or Latino.
  - Site of the May 2022 Uvalde school shooting
- Anthon Elementary (Grades 1–2; defunct)
  - Historically Anthon Elementary was a school for students of Hispanic origins.
