= Uvalde High School =

Public school in Texas, United States

Location
- 1 Coyote Trail; Uvalde, Texas 78801; 29.21958351135254°N 99.7820816040039°W

Information
- Type: Public high school
- Motto: Loyal and True
- Established: 1885
- NCES District ID: 484372004971
- CEEB code: 447165
- Principal: Randy Harris
- Teaching staff: 86.66 (FTE)
- Grades: 9–12
- Enrollment: 1,242 (2023-24)
- Student to teacher ratio: 14.33
- Colors: Maroon and white
- Song: Loyal and True
- Mascot: Coyote/Lobo
- Nickname: Coyotes
- USNWR ranking: 13,383-17,843
- Yearbook: The Coyote
- Website: uhs.ucisd.net

Uvalde High School is a public high school for grades 9–12 in Uvalde, Texas, in the United States. It has a current enrollment of about 1,250 students. The school is part of the Uvalde Consolidated Independent School District. The school is 90.4% Hispanic as of the 2022-2023 school year.

== History ==
The first school in Uvalde was built in 1885. It initially served all grade levels. The school was expanded in 1891, but later burned down in 1898. A new school was built in its place in 1900. The current structure was built in 1908 following an increase in enrollment.

In 1949, the Batesville Independent School District began sending its students to Uvalde High School.

In 1970, a large group of Hispanic students boycotted their classes after the all-white school board declined to renew a Hispanic elementary school teacher's contract. The students also protested the lack of bilingual education. By the end of the year, the school board had not given in to their demands.

=== Connection to the Robb Elementary School shooting ===
The Uvalde School shooting was a mass shooting that occurred on May 24, 2022 at Robb Elementary school. The shooting resulted in the deaths of 19 students and two teachers. The perpetrator, Salvador Ramos, was a former student of Uvalde High School. He was withdrawn from the school by school officials on October 28, 2021 due to his poor attendance.

== Notable alumni ==
- Dolph Briscoe, governor of Texas
- Johnny Hatley, football player
- Brooks Raley, baseball player
- Matthew McConaughey, Oscar-winning actor

== See also ==
- List of high schools in Texas
