= Uvalde school shooting =

2022 mass shooting in Texas, U.S.

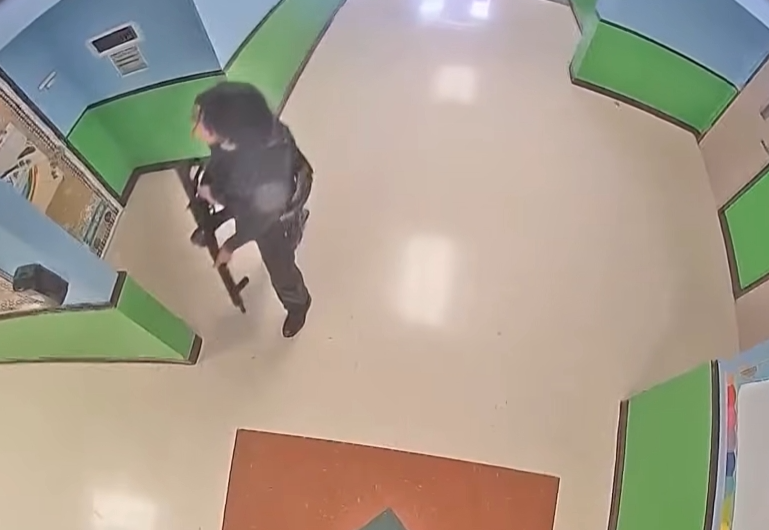
- A CCTV still of Ramos shortly after entering Robb Elementary
- Location of Robb Elementary School in Uvalde, Texas
- Location: 29°11′58″N 99°47′18″W; Robb Elementary School, 715 Old Carrizo Road; Uvalde, Texas, U.S.
- Date: May 24, 2022; 4 years ago 11:28 a.m. – 12:50 p.m. (CDT; UTC−05:00)
- Target: Students and staff at Robb Elementary School
- Attack type: Mass shooting; mass murder; school shooting; pedicide; shootout
- Weapons: 5.56 NATO Daniel Defense DDM4 V7 AR-15–style rifle; 5.56 NATO Smith & Wesson M&P15 Volunteer XV (unused; left in the truck)
- Deaths: 22 (including the perpetrator)
- Injuries: 21 (18 directly, including the perpetrator's grandmother at her home; 3 minor injuries during civilian conflicts with police)
- Perpetrator: Salvador Rolando Ramos
- Motive: Notoriety
- Accused: Responding police officer: Pedro Arredondo
- Charges: 10 counts of Felony abandoning or endangering a child
- Verdict: Responding police officer: Adrian Gonzales found not guilty of 29 counts of abandoning or endangering a child
- Convictions: 15-year-old girl in Germany convicted of neglecting to report planned crimes

On May 24, 2022, a mass shooting occurred at Robb Elementary School in Uvalde, Texas, United States. Salvador Ramos, an 18-year-old former student of the school, fatally shot 19 children and 2 teachers, while injuring 18 others. Ramos was shot and killed 77 minutes after entering the classroom by law enforcement officers.

It is the third deadliest shooting at an American school after the Virginia Tech shooting in 2007 and the Sandy Hook Elementary School shooting in 2012. It would also become the third deadliest mass shooting, and the deadliest school shooting in Texas history, surpassing the 1966 University of Texas Tower Shooting. After shooting and wounding his grandmother at their home, Ramos drove to Robb Elementary School, where he entered a classroom and shot his victims, having bypassed local and state officers who had been in the hallways. He remained in the classrooms for 1 hour and 14 minutes before members of the United States Border Patrol Tactical Unit breached the classroom and fatally shot him. Police officers did not breach the classroom, but cordoned off the school grounds, resulting in violent conflicts between police and civilians, including parents, who were attempting to enter the school to rescue children. As a consequence, law enforcement officials in Uvalde were criticized for their response, and their conduct was reviewed in separate investigations by the Texas Ranger Division and United States Department of Justice.

Texas Department of Public Safety (DPS) officials laid much of the responsibility for the police response on Uvalde Consolidated Independent School District Police Department (UCISD PD) Chief Pedro Arredondo, whom they identified as the incident commander. Arredondo disputed the characterization of his role as incident commander, but was fired by the Uvalde school board. A report by the Texas House of Representatives Investigative Committee attributed the fault more widely to "systemic failures and egregious poor decision making" by many authorities. It said, "At Robb Elementary, law enforcement responders failed to adhere to their active shooter training, and they failed to prioritize saving the lives of innocent victims over their own safety... there was an unacceptably long period of time before officers breached the classroom, neutralized the attacker, and began rescue efforts."

Shortly after the shooting, local and state officials gave inaccurate reports of the timeline of events and exaggerated police actions. The Texas Department of Public Safety acknowledged it was an error for law enforcement to delay an assault on Ramos' position in the student-filled classrooms, attributing this to the school district police chief's assessment of the situation as one with a "barricaded subject", instead of an "active shooter". Law enforcement was aware there were injured individuals in the school before they made their entrance. In June 2024, two officers, including Arredondo, were criminally indicted for allegedly mishandling the response to the shooting. On January 21, 2026, former Uvalde school officer Adrian Gonzalez was acquitted of 29 child endangerment charges. The trial of former Uvalde school police chief Pete Arredondo on 10 counts of "abandoning or endangering a child" has been scheduled for February 22, 2027.

Discussions ensued about American gun culture and violence, gridlock in politics, and law enforcement's failure to intervene during the attack. A month after the shooting, Congress passed the Bipartisan Safer Communities Act and President Joe Biden signed it into law; it was the most significant federal gun reform legislation since the Federal Assault Weapons Ban of 1994. Investigations revealed that Ramos was motivated to do the attack for infamy. After the shooting, Robb Elementary was permanently closed. The district plans to demolish it and build a replacement.

== Background ==
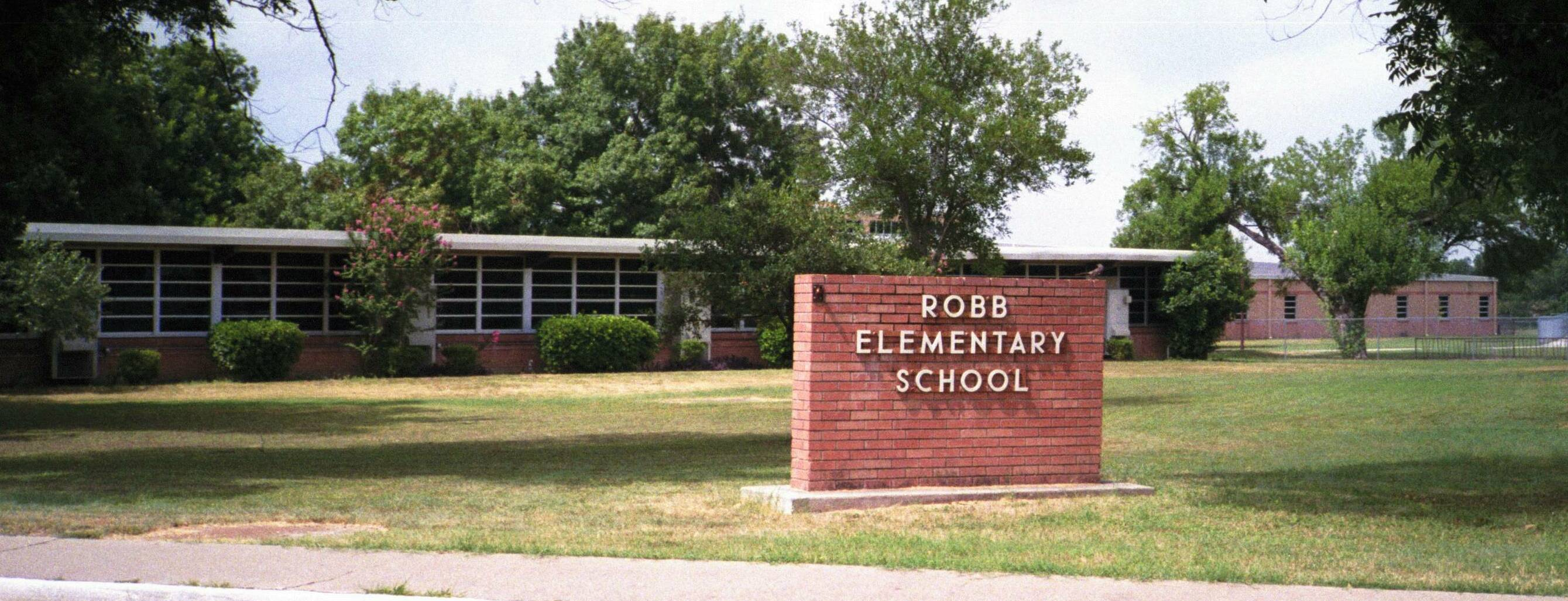
Robb Elementary School in 2015

Uvalde is a Hispanic-majority city of about 15,000 people in the South Texas region; it is located about 60 miles (97 km) east of the United States–Mexico border and about 85 miles (137 km) west of San Antonio. In 2022, about 90% of Robb Elementary School's 600 students in the second through fourth grades were Hispanic, and about 81% of the student population came from economically disadvantaged backgrounds. On the day of the shooting, there had been an awards ceremony at the school.

Ahead of the shooting, Ramos had purchased 1,657 total rounds of ammunition, which included 375 rounds of 5.56 NATO ammunition purchased on May 18, 2022. A total of 315 rounds were found inside the school, consisting of 142 spent cartridges and 173 live rounds. Additionally, a total of 922 rounds were found on school property outside the building, consisting of 22 spent cartridges and 900 live rounds. Overall, Ramos fired 142 rounds during the shooting. Police and Border Patrol officers fired a combined total of 35 rounds during the shooting: eight in the hallway and 27 in the classroom where Ramos was killed.

=== School security preparations ===
The city of Uvalde spent 40% of its municipal budget on its police department in the 2019–2020 fiscal year, and UCISD, the school district operating Robb Elementary School, had multiple security measures in place at the time of the shooting. The Uvalde Consolidated Independent School District Police Department (UCISD PD) had a six-officer police department responsible for security at the district's eight schools. It had also more than doubled its expenditures on security measures in the four years preceding the shooting, and in 2021, it expanded its police force from four officers to six officers. The state of Texas had given UCISD a $69,141 grant to improve security measures as part of a $100 million statewide allocation made after the 2018 Santa Fe High School shooting, in which ten people were killed. The district also had a security staff that patrolled door entrances and parking lots at secondary school campuses. Since 2020, Pedro "Pete" Arredondo had served as UCISD's police chief.

The school and school district had extensive security measures in place. The school used Social Sentinel, a software service that monitored the social media accounts of students and other Uvalde-affiliated people to identify threats made against students or staff. The district's written security plan noted the use of the Raptor Visitor Management System in schools to scan visitor identity documents and check them against watch-lists, as well as the use of two-way radios, fence enclosures around campus, school threat-assessment teams, and a policy of locking the doors of classrooms. According to a report released by the Texas House of Representatives on July 17, although the official school policy was for exterior and interior doors to remain locked, staff members would often unlock or open doors due to a lack of keys. Additionally, some employees were desensitized to the intruder alert system, as it was almost always used for incidents of an undocumented migrant in the area running from police.

UCISD held joint security training exercises in August 2020 along with the Uvalde Police Department, the Uvalde County Sheriff's Department, and other local law enforcement agencies. UCISD also hosted an active shooter scenario training exercise in March 2022, which covered a range of topics, such as solo responses to active shooters, first aid and evacuation, and scenarios enacted through role-playing. The exercise also covered the ability to compare and contrast an active shooter situation versus a barricaded subject or hostage crisis where an armed person isolates themselves with limited to no ability to harm others. The March 2022 training materials for UCISD said, "Time is the number-one enemy during active shooter response ... The best hope that innocent victims have is that officers immediately move into action to isolate, distract or neutralize the threat, even if that means one officer acting alone." The materials also put forth the position that a "first responder unwilling to place the lives of the innocent above their own safety should consider another career field".

== Events ==
=== Shooting ===
On May 24, 2022, Salvador Ramos and his 66-year-old grandmother had an argument over his failure to graduate from high school at their home in Uvalde, during which he shot her in the face, before taking her black 2008 Ford F-150. She survived and got help from neighbors while police officers were called in. She was then airlifted to a hospital in San Antonio in critical condition.

Ramos, using his Facebook account, sent three private messages to a 15-year-old girl from Germany whom he had met online prior to the shooting: the first to say that he was going to shoot his grandmother, the second to say that he had shot his grandmother, and the third – about 15 minutes before the shooting – to say that he was going to open fire at an elementary school. The girl replied, "cool". Later she faced trial in Frankfurt, Germany, and was found guilty of "failing to report planned crimes". She was issued a warning and was required to "undergo educational measures". A spokesperson for Meta, the parent company of Facebook, said the posts were "private one-to-one text messages" discovered after the shooting took place.

Ramos crashed his grandmother's truck through a barricade and into a concrete ditch outside Robb Elementary School at 11:28 a.m. CDT (UTC–5) and proceeded to scale a fence and enter the school grounds. According to police, he wore a tactical vest for carrying ammunition that did not include ballistic protection or armor insert panels, plus a backpack and all-black clothing, while carrying an AR-15–style rifle and seven 30-round magazines. He brought into the school only one of the two rifles that he had legally bought, and left the other in the crashed truck. A witness said he first fired at two people at a nearby funeral home who came to check on the car crash, both of whom escaped uninjured. Police reported receiving 9-1-1 calls about a vehicle having crashed near the school. After hearing of the 9-1-1 call, a school resource officer drove to the school's campus and pursued a teacher whom the officer erroneously believed to be the gunman, driving past the actual gunman in the process. A report released on July 6 found that an officer had aimed his rifle at Ramos before he entered the school, but did not fire because he was awaiting his supervisor's permission.

CCTV footage of the main hallway of Robb Elementary School during the shooting.

UCISD's police chief estimated that the shooting began at 11:32, according to a Facebook post by the school. At 11:40 a.m., a teacher in Room 102 reached a 9-1-1 dispatcher after having tried unsuccessfully to reach them on three occasions. The teacher told the dispatcher that she could hear gunshots in a nearby classroom. The school was placed in lockdown at 11:43 a.m. in response to gunshots heard in the vicinity. Ramos entered the school through its west-facing entrance door, which had been shut by a teacher who had seen him. The entrance door did not lock despite being designed to be locked when shut. After entering the building, Ramos walked down two short hallways and then entered a classroom that was internally connected to another classroom. All of the fatalities took place in these adjoining classrooms, 111 and 112. A survivor of the shooting said that, as teacher Irma Garcia attempted to lock the door to the classroom, he shot the door's window, then backed Garcia into the classroom, and said, "Goodnight", as he shot and killed her. Another survivor recounted that Ramos said, "You're all gonna die", after entering the classroom. He then opened fire on the rest of the students and another teacher in the room. According to a surviving student, Ramos played "sad music" during the massacre. After he killed his first set of victims, he scooped up their blood and wrote "LOL" on the chalkboard.

Most of the shooting occurred inside the building within the first few minutes; Ramos was inside the classroom for over an hour while armed police remained outside the classroom and building. Multiple students played dead while the shooting took place, including one student, 11-year-old Miah Cerrillo, who smeared herself with the blood of one of her dead classmates to give credence to the subterfuge. According to a student who hid in the adjoining classroom, Ramos came in and slightly crouched down saying, "It's time to die", before opening fire. Afterward, a responding officer called out, "Yell if you need help!" A girl in the adjoining classroom said, "Help." Ramos heard the girl, entered the classroom, and shot her. A student said that the officer then barged into the classroom, and Ramos fired at the officer, causing more officers to return fire.

Arnulfo Reyes, a teacher in classroom 111 who received multiple gunshot wounds, recalled he instructed his students to "get under the table and act like you're asleep". Ramos then arrived and shot him before firing indiscriminately around classroom 111. Reyes said he "didn't hear talk for a while", but later on, Ramos unleashed a second round of gunfire at students, and Reyes said, "If he didn't get them the first time, he got them the second time." All 11 students in classroom 111 during the shooting died. Reyes pretended to be unconscious on the floor, but Ramos then shot him again. Ramos would also torment Reyes while he was immobile on the floor. Reyes stated Ramos had picked up blood and threw it onto his face, and that Ramos picked up a thermos off of a kidney-shaped table and poured the water out on his back. Reyes also stated when he heard a phone start ringing, Ramos would pick up the phone and begin dropping it onto Reyes back and picking it back up again and again. Reyes additionally stated that Ramos, while inside the classroom, had stomped on his victims heads and arms, and had spat on them. According to Reyes, he heard law enforcement approach his classroom from what sounded like the hallway three times, but they did not enter; during one of these occasions, he heard a student from the adjoining classroom 112 saying, "Officer, we're in here. We're in here." As law enforcement had already left, Reyes said Ramos "walked over there, and he shot again". Reyes later heard law enforcement telling Ramos to come out of the classroom to talk, saying they did not want to hurt anyone. Separately, Reyes said in past security checks, the classroom 111 door that was meant to be locked during lessons remained unlocked because "the latch was stuck", and that he had told the principal about this issue.

A male student in classroom 109 said that around 15 minutes after the shooting began, the gunman approached classroom 109's door and pulled its handle, but his teacher had jammed the door after hearing gunfire. The gunman shot through the door's glass window, striking another student and a fourth grade teacher in classroom 109, then left. With a Texas official stating that the gunman had briefly returned into the hallway after entering classrooms 111 and 112 (without specifying what time this occurred), The Washington Post reported that "this is likely when those in Room 109 were shot at", before the gunman returned to classrooms 111 and 112.

Officers arrived three minutes after Ramos entered the school and approached rooms 111 and 112, but they retreated after Ramos fired at them, injuring two officers with grazing wounds to the head. Officers were not successful in establishing negotiations.

=== Additional emergency response ===
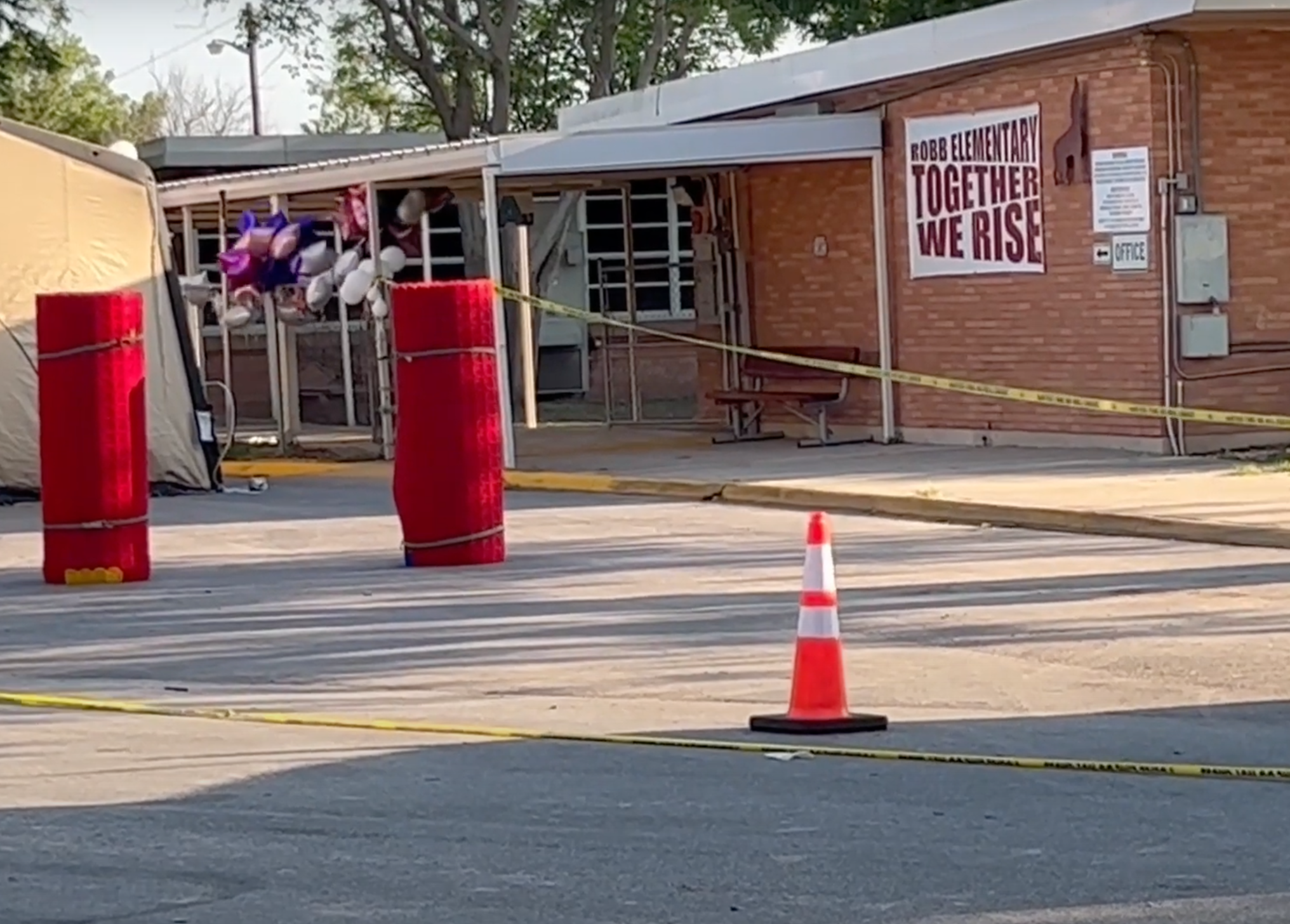
Police lines set up outside of Robb Elementary School

United States Marshals Service deputies drove nearly 70 miles (110 km) to the school and arrived at 12:10 p.m., where they helped officers initially confront the shooter, render first aid, and secure the perimeter. At 12:17, UCISD sent out a message on Twitter that there was an active shooter at the elementary school. The school district's police chief, Pedro Arredondo, erroneously determined that the situation had "transitioned from an active shooter to a barricaded subject" according to the Texas Department of Public Safety (DPS). With Ramos thought to be contained, officials believed they had bought enough time to bring in tactical units.

According to Uvalde County judge Bill Mitchell, teacher Eva Mireles, from inside the adjoining classrooms where the shooter was, called her husband, Ruben Ruiz, a Uvalde Consolidated Independent School District officer, who was outside the school. According to DPS Director Steven McCraw, during the call Mireles told Ruiz that she had been shot and was dying; when Ruiz "tried to move forward into the hallway, he was detained [by law enforcement] and they took his gun away from him and escorted him off the scene." Mireles eventually died from her gunshot wounds.

After the police cordoned off the outside of the school, parents pleaded with officers to enter the building. When they did not, parents offered to enter the building themselves. Officers held back and tackled parents who tried to enter the school, further warning that they would use tasers if the parents did not comply with directions. Video clips of these interactions were uploaded to social media, including one that depicted a parent being pinned to the ground. Police pepper-sprayed a parent trying to get to their child, and an officer tackled the father of another student. Police reportedly used a taser on a parent who approached a bus to get their child. A mother of two students at the school was placed in handcuffs by officers for attempting to enter the school. When released from the handcuffs, she jumped the fence and retrieved her children, exiting before police entered. A video clip showed parents questioning why police were not trying to save their children, to which an officer replies: "Because I'm having to deal with you!"

A United States Border Patrol Tactical Unit (BORTAC) agent rushed to the scene after receiving a text message from his wife, who was a teacher there. Prior to this, the agent had been off-duty. The agent immediately set out with a shotgun his barber had lent him and arrived on the scene approximately an hour after the first responders arrived. He then proceeded to help evacuate children. Contrary to online rumors and social media posts, he did not enter the school or kill the shooter. Additional BORTAC agents arrived, but they did not have a battering ram or other breaching tools, so a U.S. Marshal on the scene provided agents with a ballistic shield. Ramos stayed in the classroom for around one hour, hiding behind a steel door that officers said they could not open until they obtained a master key from the janitor. There is evidence that the door was never locked.

After the door was opened, a BORTAC agent entered the room holding the shield, followed by two other BORTAC agents, a Border Patrol Search, Trauma, and Rescue agent (BORSTAR), and at least one sheriff's deputy. Ramos reportedly opened fire at the group from a closet in the room before officials returned fire and killed him.

=== Account by Pedro Arredondo ===
In an interview by The Texas Tribune published on June 9, 2022, Uvalde School District Police Chief at the time, Pedro "Pete" Arredondo, said he arrived at the school thinking he was the first law enforcement officer on the scene. He claimed he abandoned his police and campus radios because he wanted his hands free to shoot the gunman, and stated he also thought the radios would slow him down. He said one radio's antenna would hit him when he ran, while the other radio was prone to falling off his belt when he ran, and that he knew from experience that the radios did not work in some school buildings. Arredondo said he was unaware of 9-1-1 calls being made from the classrooms the gunman was in because he did not have a radio and no one told him; the other officers in the school hallway were not in radio communication either.

In The Texas Tribune interview, Arredondo said that he did not consider himself as the incident commander for law enforcement; instead, his role was a frontline responder, with him assuming someone else was in command. The National Incident Management System, which guides all levels of government on how to respond to mass emergency events, says that the first person on scene is the incident commander. DPS officials have described Arredondo as the incident commander and identified him as giving the order to treat the situation as a barricaded subject. Arredondo said that he attempted to open the door to classroom 111, while a Uvalde Police Department officer tried the door to classroom 112, but both were locked. According to Arredondo, the classroom door had a steel jamb that prevented law enforcement from easily breaching it. Later reporting indicated these doors were not in fact locked.

Arredondo was aware the gunman was firing from within the classroom, and that some shots had grazed police officers. According to Arredondo, he and the officers in the school hallway did their best to remain quiet, only whispering to each other, fearing that if the gunman heard them, he would shoot at them. He spent over an hour in the hallway, of which he held back from the classroom doors for 40 minutes to avoid attracting gunfire. Arredondo said that during the wait for door breaching tools, he tried to talk to the gunman through the walls to establish rapport, but got no response.

Also in The Texas Tribune interview, Arredondo said he was provided with six keys, which he tried on a door adjacent to the room where the gunman was, but none opened that door. He stated he later received another 20–30 keys which also did not work, and that eventually, other officers called his cellphone to inform him they had obtained a suitable key. Arredondo denied cowardice and incompetence, stating that law enforcement's "objective was to save as many lives as we could, and the extraction of the students from the classrooms by all that were involved saved over 500 of our Uvalde students and teachers before we gained access to the shooter and eliminated the threat".

=== Timeline of events ===
Below is a timeline of events, according to law enforcement and other sources. This timeline is still under investigation. As of June 19, 2022, there are multiple disputes about the timeline.

Time	Event
Around 11:10 a.m.	Ramos shoots his grandmother. He then texts a 15-year-old online acquaintance in Germany, tells her that he shot his grandmother and is headed to attack a school. He takes his grandmother's truck and drives towards Robb Elementary School.
11:28 a.m.	Ramos crashes his grandmother's truck into a ditch near the school and exits the vehicle, armed, leaving one rifle by the truck. He begins firing shots at two men arriving on foot from a nearby funeral home. They run back to the funeral home uninjured.
11:30 a.m.	First 9-1-1 call placed by a teacher who saw Ramos, while the U.S. Marshals Service received a call for assistance from a Uvalde police officer. The teacher enters the school through its west entrance door, and shuts it. The door remains unlocked because it can only be locked from the outside.
11:31 a.m.	From outside the school, Ramos initiates gunfire, with some bullets penetrating classroom windows a minute later.
11:31 a.m.	A Uvalde Consolidated Independent School District (UCISD) officer arrives at the school, having heard the 9-1-1 call. He drives past the gunman, and misidentifies a teacher as the gunman.
11:33 a.m.	Ramos enters the school through its west entrance door, walks through the hallway and shoots into interconnected classrooms 111 and 112 from the hallway, then enters, exits and re-enters classrooms 111 and 112. He proceeds to fire over 100 rounds in four minutes within classrooms 111 and 112.
11:35 a.m.	Three UPD officers with two rifles enter the school from its west entrance door. They are followed eight seconds later by another three UPD officers and one UCISD officer.
11:36 a.m.	Within five seconds of the first three UPD officers' entry, UCISD Chief Arredondo, along with another UCISD officer and two UPD officers, enter the school through its south entrance door.
11:37 a.m.	Ramos' gunfire grazes two officers in the hallway.
11:40 a.m.	Arredondo calls the UPD landline, stating, "We have him in the room. He's got an AR-15. He's shot a lot ... we don't have firepower right now ... It's all pistols ... I don't have a radio ... I need you to bring a radio for me, and give me my radio for me ... I need to get one rifle ... I'm trying to set him up." At other times during the call, he says, "I need this building surrounded ... with as many AR-15s as possible," and asks for a police SWAT team to be set up on the south side of the school.
11:41 a.m.	While on the line with a dispatcher, a UPD officer says, "We believe that he is barricaded in one of the offices. There's still shooting." When asked if the room's door is locked, a UPD officer replies: "I am not sure but we have a Halligan to break it".
11:42 a.m.	A teacher reportedly texts someone to inform them of an active shooter on the school campus.
11:43 a.m.	The school announces their lockdown "due to gunshots in the area," via Facebook, adding, "students and staff are safe in the building."
11:44 a.m.	Officers request more resources, equipment, body armor, and negotiators; the evacuation of students begins.
11:52 a.m.	A ballistic shield is brought into the school from the west entrance door. A second, third, and fourth ballistic shield are brought into the school at 12:02 p.m., 12:03 p.m., and 12:20 p.m., respectively, from the west entrance door.
11:58 a.m.	A DPS special agent states, "If there's kids in there, we need to go in there," to which another law enforcement officer replies, "What's that?" "If there's kids in there, we need to go in there," the DPS special agent repeats. "Whoever is in charge will determine that," an unknown officer says. This recorded exchange is included in the released video.
12:03 p.m.	Nineteen law enforcement officers gather in the hallway to the classrooms but do not enter the classroom Ramos is in because the alleged incident commander, Pedro Arredondo, was treating the situation as one with a "barricaded subject" instead of an "active shooter". On June 10, 2022, Arredondo told CBS News that he did not know he was the incident commander at the time. It has been alleged that Arredondo believed no more lives were at risk and that he wanted more equipment and officers before conducting a tactical breach.
12:03 p.m.	A female student calls 9-1-1 from classroom 112, identifying herself and the classroom number; she ends the call after 1 minute 23 seconds.
12:10 p.m.	The first group of deputy U.S. Marshals arrives at the school to assist. The female student from classroom 112 calls 9-1-1 a second time.
12:12 p.m.	Uvalde Police Department's acting chief, Lieutenant Mariano Pargas, is told by an officer of his department that a "child called 911 saying the room's full of victims." Pargas then enters the school and tells officers there: "A child just called that they have victims in there," then leaves.
12:13 p.m.	The student in classroom 112 calls 9-1-1 a third time, reporting multiple people dead in the classroom.
12:14 p.m.	Arredondo instructs officers to position a sniper on the east roof.
12:15 p.m.	Some members of the Border Patrol Tactical Unit arrive at the school with tactical shields.
12:16 p.m.	The student in room 112 calls 9-1-1 for a fourth time, reporting that eight to nine students are still alive in the classroom.
12:16 p.m.	Pargas calls his department's dispatchers who tell him that a female student who has been calling from Room 112 said there are eight to nine students still alive in that room. Pargas responds: "OK, OK thanks." In the next four minutes, Pargas tells a Border Patrol officer about injured victims, then talks to a Texas Ranger without mentioning children in the classroom with the shooter. Pargas then leaves the school hallway and does not return.
12:17 p.m.	The school announces on its Facebook page that there is an active shooter on campus and authorities are on the scene.
12:17 p.m.	Arredondo can be heard on the body camera footage instructing officers, "Tell them to fucking wait. No one comes in."
12:19 p.m.	A student from classroom 111 calls 9-1-1 but hangs up when another student tells her to end the call.
12:21 p.m.	Four shots are heard from surveillance footage.
12:23 p.m.	Arredondo says, "We've lost two kids. These walls are thin. If he starts shooting, we're going to lose more kids. I hate to say we have to put those to the side right now."
12:24 p.m.	Arredondo tries to talk to the gunman through the wall of an adjacent room, speaking in English and then Spanish, to surrender. He does so again at 12:38 p.m. The gunman, Ramos, never responds.
12:27 p.m.	Arredondo says: "People are going to ask why we're taking so long. We're trying to preserve the rest of the life".
12:28 p.m.	Arredondo says: "There is a window over there obviously. The door is probably going to be locked. That is the nature of this place. I am going to get some more keys to test".
12:35 p.m.	A Halligan tool for breaching is brought into the school from the west entrance door.
12:36 p.m.	The student in room 112 calls 9-1-1 for a fifth time, reporting that Ramos has shot a door. She is instructed to stay on the line and be very quiet.
12:41 p.m.	Arredondo says: "Just so you understand, we think there are some injuries in there. And so you know what we did, we cleared off the rest of the building so we wouldn't have any more, besides what's already in there, obviously."
12:43 p.m.	A student in classroom 112 calls 9-1-1 and asks the operator to send the police now.
12:46 p.m.	The student in classroom 112 says she can hear the police next door.
12:46 p.m.	Arredondo says: "If y'all are ready to do it, you do it, but you should distract him out that window."
12:47 p.m.	The student in classroom 112 again asks the 9-1-1 operator to send the police immediately.
12:48 p.m.	DPS Captain Joel Betancourt, on police radio, gives a command to wait: "The team that's going to make breach needs to stand by. The team that's gonna breach needs to stand by".
12:50 p.m.	Off-duty Border Patrol officers use a janitor's master key to unlock the door Ramos has locked, and they enter the classroom while bypassing the UCISD officers. As of June 18, 2022, a conflicting investigative report now states that the door was always unlocked. Ramos, hiding in a closet, kicks the door open and starts shooting at the officers. The officers return fire and kill him.

== Victims ==
Nineteen students and two teachers were killed in the shooting:

- Teachers:
- Irma Linda Garcia, 48
- Eva Mireles, 44
- Students:
- Nevaeh Alyssa Bravo, 10
- Jacklyn Jaylen Cazares, 9
- Makenna Lee Elrod, 10
- Jose Manuel Flores Jr., 10
- Eliahna Amyah Garcia, 9
- Uziyah Sergio Garcia, 10
- Amerie Jo Garza, 10
- Xavier James Lopez, 10
- Jayce Carmelo Luevanos, 10
- Tess Marie Mata, 10
- Maranda Gail Mathis, 11
- Alithia Haven Ramirez, 10
- Annabell Guadalupe Rodriguez, 10
- Maite Yuleana Rodriguez, 10
- Alexandria Aniyah Rubio, 10
- Layla Marie Salazar, 11
- Jailah Nicole Silguero, 10
- Eliahna Cruz Torres, 10
- Rojelio Fernandez Torres, 10

The children were in the fourth grade. The teachers taught in the same fourth-grade classroom.

Eighteen people were injured: fourteen children, one teacher, the perpetrator's grandmother, and two police officers. Abbott said the two officers were struck by bullets but had no serious injuries. Several victims died in the ambulance on the way to the hospital, including Mireles. Uvalde Memorial Hospital's CEO reported that eleven children and three other people were admitted for emergency care following the shooting. Four were released, and two, described only as a male and a female, were dead upon arrival. Four other victims, the perpetrator's grandmother and three students, were taken to the University Hospital in San Antonio.

== Perpetrator ==
ID photo of Ramos

Salvador Rolando Ramos (May 16, 2004 – May 24, 2022) was born in Fargo, North Dakota, and moved to Uvalde at an early age. Ramos had an older sister and a mother. He was a resident of Uvalde from an early age and described in kindergarten report cards as "a remarkable little boy," "a sweet little boy," and "a very hard worker". He attended fourth grade at Robb Elementary School in the same classroom where he was killed.

Ramos was frequently bullied in school for having a speech disorder, his physical appearance, his clothes, and his family's financial situation. He also faced abusive treatment from his mother. Reports say a former girlfriend of Ramos told the FBI that Ramos might have been sexually assaulted by one of his mother's boyfriends when he was young, but when Ramos told his mother about the abuse, she did not believe him. Ramos's mother was a drug user and was reportedly in the process of being evicted from his grandmother's house due to her drug problems, just days before the shooting. Ramos's father was absent during his adolescence.

During his high school years, he reportedly engaged in self-harm behavior and received poor grades. He was a former student at Uvalde High School. School officials at Uvalde High School withdrew him from the school on October 28, 2021, due to his frequent absences. Lt. Chris Olivarez from Texas DPS claimed that Ramos had no friends. A senior at Uvalde High School said that she "knew people did not like him. People would make fun of him or want to fight with him", but she did not know why.

Ramos did not have a criminal record or any documented mental health issues. He recorded an eating disorder on his phone notes, identifying as anorexic and reporting self-induced vomiting. He had searched the term "sociopath" and received an email about possible treatment. Ramos' mother described her son as "not a monster" but admitted that he could "be aggressive". His grandfather said that his grandson did not have a driver's license and did not know how to drive. According to his father, Ramos had a girlfriend, who lived in San Antonio. Ramos had a close friend, and the two would sometimes play Xbox games.

=== Warning signs ===
Some of Ramos' social media acquaintances said he openly abused and killed animals such as cats, and would livestream the abuse on Yubo. Some said he would livestream himself threatening to kidnap and rape girls who used the app, as well as hinting at the idea of committing a school shooting. Some online acquaintances referred to him as "Yubo's school shooter". Ramos' account was reported to Yubo, but no action was taken.

Up until a month before the shooting, Ramos worked at a local Wendy's and had been employed there for at least a year. According to the store's night manager, he went out of his way to keep to himself. One of his coworkers said he was occasionally rude to his female coworkers, to whom he sent inappropriate text messages, and would intimidate coworkers at his job by asking them, "Do you know who I am?" Ramos' coworkers referred to him by names including "school shooter" because he had long hair and frequently wore black clothing. Ramos also previously worked at Whataburger, where a coworker said that "He always seemed to take his anger out on the most innocent person in the room." According to a friend of his, he would often drive around at night with another friend, shooting at strangers with a BB gun and egging cars.

According to a man who was in a relationship with Ramos' mother, Ramos moved out of his mother's house and into his grandparents' house two months before the shooting, after an argument broke out between him and his mother over Ramos turning off the Wi-Fi. Two months prior to the shooting, he posted a video of himself on Instagram aggressively arguing with his mother and referring to her as a "bitch". On May 14, Ramos sent a private Instagram message reading, "10 more days". A person responded, "Are you going to shoot up a school or something?" He replied, "No, stop asking dumb questions. You'll see."

A year before the shooting, Ramos started posting pictures to his Instagram account of semi-automatic rifles that were on his wish list. According to the Texas Department of Public Safety, in September 2021, Ramos asked his older sister to buy him a gun, but she refused. On May 17, 2022, a day after his 18th birthday, he legally purchased a Smith & Wesson semi automatic rifle from a local gun store. He then purchased another rifle three days later. Investigators later found that his gun had a "hellfire" trigger device, which decreases the time required for the trigger to reset, increasing the possible rate of fire. Ramos sent an Instagram message to an acquaintance he met through Yubo, which showed the receipt for an AR-15–style rifle purchased from Georgia-based online retailer Daniel Defense eight days before the shooting. He posted a picture of two rifles on his Instagram account three days before the shooting. He used the money that he had been saving up from his job at Wendy's to purchase these items. Ahead of the shooting, Ramos had purchased 1,657 total rounds of ammunition, which included 375 rounds of 5.56 NATO ammunition purchased on May 18, 2022.

=== Motive ===
The primary motive for the attack was identified by a 77-page Texas House of Representatives committee report as a wish to achieve "notoriety and fame". Ramos explicitly stated online days before the attack that he planned something to "put him all over the news" and expressed frustration over the low number of views on his social media accounts.

== Investigations ==
The Federal Bureau of Investigation (FBI) and the Bureau of Alcohol, Tobacco, Firearms and Explosives (ATF) are assisting local police in the investigation. Ramos' guns and magazines were recovered by law enforcement for analysis. Two days after the shooting, state officials said that the Texas Ranger Division was investigating local police's conduct during the incident. On May 29, the United States Department of Justice announced it would review the law enforcement response to the mass shooting at the request of Uvalde Mayor, Don McLaughlin.

After initially praising first responders, Governor Greg Abbott called for an investigation into the lack of initiative displayed by law enforcement. On May 27, Abbott said, "Bottom line would be why did they not choose the strategy that would have been best to get in there and to eliminate the killer and to rescue the children?" On June 1, ABC News, citing multiple unnamed law enforcement sources, reported that the Uvalde Police Department (UPD) and the UCISD police force had stopped cooperating with investigations soon after the DPS said on May 27 that police had erred in delaying entry into the classroom. The DPS responded that the UPD and UCISD police force "have been cooperating with investigators", while specifying that UCISD police chief Pedro Arredondo "provided an initial interview but has not responded to a request for a follow-up interview with the Texas Rangers that was made two days ago." Also on June 1, Arredondo told CNN that he was "in contact with DPS every day" and said he would not release further information about the events of the shooting while funerals are ongoing, citing respect for families: "Whenever this is done and the families quit grieving, then we'll do that obviously."

When Uvalde Police Department's acting chief Lieutenant Mariano Pargas was interviewed by authorities two days after the shooting, he did not mention that he had known at the time that there were children in the classroom with the shooter. Pargas said that he had officer Ruben Ruiz removed from the hallway after Ruiz said that Ruiz's wife was shot in her classroom, because "we were just afraid that he was gonna try to run in the classroom and try to do what I wanted to do if I could have done it". When Pargas was interviewed again in mid-June and asked about 911 calls made from inside the classroom, Pargas said he cannot remember, and does not mention that he had called his department's dispatchers, who told him about 911 calls from children inside the classroom. Instead, Pargas said: "The last thing we thought was that [the shooter] had actually shot the kids. We thought he had shot up in the air, broken the lights. We had no idea what was behind those doors."

=== Texas House Investigative Committee ===
On June 9, a committee of three started their investigations into the shooting on behalf of the Texas House of Representatives; the committee consisted of Representative Dustin Burrows (R-Lubbock), Representative Joe Moody (D-El Paso) and former Texas Supreme Court member Eva Guzman (R). That day, committee leader Burrows explained that the investigation would be done in private out of "respect for the process" and wanting to be "thorough" and "accurate" before revealing "any conclusions". On June 20, before the committee had a hearing at Uvalde City Hall, a fire marshal told parents, journalists, and a chaplain to leave the premises because "someone is intimidated".

=== Attempts to block release of police records ===
On June 16, the City of Uvalde through its attorneys cited several reasons to prevent the release of police records related to the shooting. The stated reasons include: information that "is not of legitimate concern to the public"; "highly embarrassing information" related to criminal history; potential revealing of police "methods, techniques, and strategies for preventing and predicting crime"; potentially distressing information; potentially exposing city employees or officers to "a substantial threat of physical harm"; privacy; and the "dead suspect loophole", where information is suppressed for crimes in which no one has been convicted, including in cases where the suspect is dead.

=== Hallway video ===
Freeman F. Martin, deputy director of Homeland Security Operations at the Texas DPS, informed Burrows that the district attorney of Uvalde County has objected to the release of a portion of a video taken in the hallway during the police response. The clip ended immediately before officers breached the classroom and did not show any images of children. Burrows, Martin, and Uvalde mayor Don McLaughlin believe that releasing the footage would be helpful to the public. On July 12, 2022, the Austin American-Statesman released 77 minutes of video composed of footage from hallway cameras and an officer's body worn camera. The released video was edited to obscure the identity of a student and to remove the sound of children screaming. The video was intended to be shown to the families of victims on Sunday, July 17, before it would be released publicly. The video was published early on July 12, which created anger amongst some of the victims' families.

The leaked video attracted further criticism and outrage, showing law enforcement to seemingly not understand the gravity of the situation, including one officer taking a pump of hand sanitizer from a dispenser, and two other officers exchanging a fist bump.

== Aftermath ==
UCISD asked parents not to pick up their children until all Robb Elementary School students were accounted for. At around 2:00 p.m., parents were notified to pick them up. All district and campus activities were canceled, and the parents of students at other schools were asked to pick up their children due to school bus cancelations. That night, UCISD's superintendent Hal Harrel announced in a letter sent to parents that the school year had concluded for the entire district, including the cancellation of a planned graduation ceremony. The school year had previously been scheduled to end two days later on Thursday. Some parents had to wait late into the night for final confirmation of their child's death, awaiting DNA identification.

On the day of the shooting, Uvalde Memorial Hospital held an emergency blood drive for the victims. The South Texas Blood and Tissue Center issued an urgent request for blood donations after the shooting, and it sent 15 units of blood to Uvalde via helicopter to be used in area hospitals. On May 27, the center reported that more than 2,000 people donated blood after the shooting.

Ramos's remains were held by the Uvalde County coroner for weeks after local funeral homes refused to arrange funeral services for him out of respect for his victims, before they were eventually cremated by Castle Ridge Mortuary in Crystal City.

=== Memorials and tributes ===
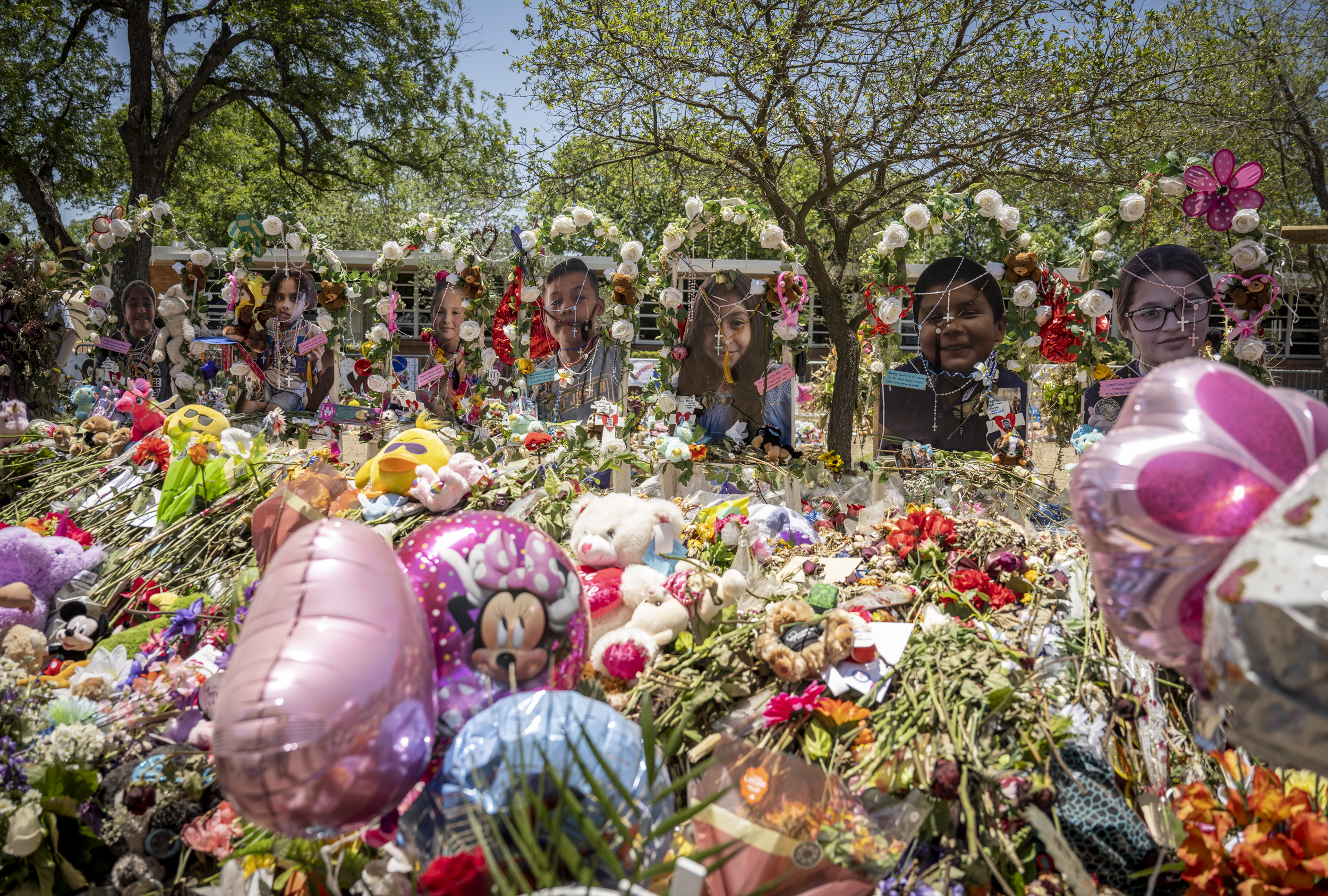
Community memorial site commemorating victims of the shooting

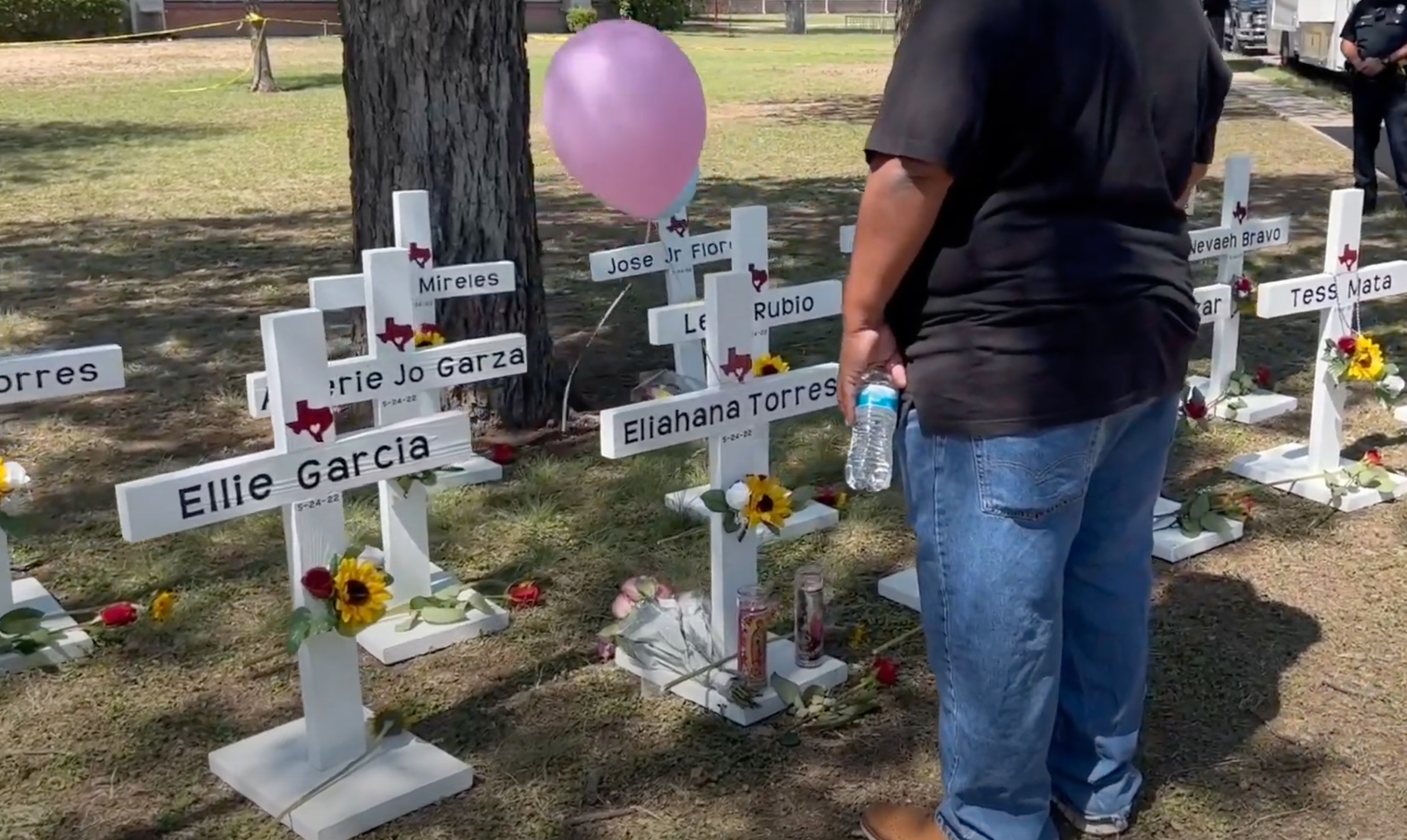
A memorial set up outside Robb Elementary school for the victims of the shooting

Shortly after the shooting, a memorial was created outside the school for the victims and survivors with balloons, candles, and crosses. A local man made 21 crosses, inscribed with the victims' names to be placed outside the school. Additional memorials were erected for the deceased victims throughout Uvalde by both locals and those who drove into the city to honor the victims. Other memorials and tributes were held throughout the country. Free headstones and funeral services were offered to the families of victims by local and state businesses. State and locally based food trucks and restaurant owners also traveled to Uvalde to offer food and supplies for families affected by the shooting. The San Antonio Zoo announced they would light up their parking garage red, Robb Elementary school's color for 21 days to honor each of the 21 victims.

Joe Garcia, the husband of Irma Garcia, one of the teachers murdered during the shooting, died two days after the shooting from a heart attack while attending a memorial. His family said the heart attack was tied to grief after losing his wife. They were survived by four of their children. UCISD created a fund through the First State Bank, with the money raised going to the families of the victims and survivors with donations accepted in person or by check. On May 27, it was announced that an anonymous donor had donated $175,000 to go towards the funerals of the victims. Fundraising was also seen on the crowdfunding platform GoFundMe, which set up a central hub for people looking to donate to help those affected by the shooting, in an effort to stop scammers from taking advantage of the shooting. As of May 27, about $7.5 million had been raised through the hub from donors across the U.S. and from over 91 countries. Additional fundraisers for the victims and their families were done through many avenues, such as item sales or proceeds from a barbecue.

Catholic Extension, a grant-giving nonprofit that finances impoverished parishes, announced it has endowed 30 full scholarships for students wounded in the Robb Elementary School mass shooting to attend Sacred Heart Catholic School, a private school in Uvalde.

=== Pedro Arredondo ===
Chief Pedro "Pete" Arredondo disputed being the incident commander for law enforcement responding to the shooting. By 12:46 p.m., Arredondo seemed to give his approval for officers to enter the room, the Times reported. "If y'all are ready to do it, you do it," he said, according to the transcript." He delivered two brief press statements on the day of the shooting (May 24) without answering any questions, then offered no public comments until June 1.

Arredondo had been elected to the Uvalde City Council on May 7, before the shooting occurred. On May 30, the mayor Don McLaughlin said that the "special City Council meeting" where Arredondo would have been sworn in as a City Council member "will not take place as scheduled", as the "focus on Tuesday is on our families who lost loved ones". McLaughlin commented that there is "nothing in the City Charter, Election Code, or Texas Constitution that prohibits [Arredondo] from taking the oath of office", and that he was "not aware of any investigation" of Arredondo. On May 31, McLaughlin revealed that Arredondo had personally visited City Hall that day and was sworn in as a City Council member, stating that the lack of a ceremony was done out of "respect for the families" whose children were killed in the shooting. Arredondo did not attend a City Council meeting on June 7; when mayor McLaughlin was questioned on Arredondo's absence, McLaughlin said he "can't answer that."

When journalists visited the UCISD headquarters, where Arredondo was, law enforcement ordered them to leave. A CNN journalist was given an initial warning, and was told that Uvalde Police were on their way and would charge journalists with criminal trespassing if they continued to remain at the headquarters. A San Antonio Express-News journalist was told by district officials that the headquarters are private property.

On June 3, UCISD's board held a meeting and decided not to take any disciplinary action against Arredondo at the time. He was put on administrative leave on June 22.

In an interview published June 9 in The Texas Tribune, Arredondo provided his first detailed public comments on the shooting. He said he did not speak out earlier to avoid blaming others or worsening the community's grief.

On July 2, Arredondo resigned from his position on the Uvalde city council. The Uvalde school board voted unanimously on August 24 to terminate Arredondo's contract as police chief. On November 14, 2023, Arredondo would also lose his honorary discharge status.

On June 27, 2024, Arredondo was indicted on charges of child endangerment by an Uvalde County grand jury. That day, Arredondo turned himself in Uvalde County Jail to be booked for 10 counts of child endangerment. Another former officer, Adrian Gonzales, was charged with 29 counts of child endangerment in a separate indictment on the same day.

=== Permanent closing of school ===
On June 3, UCISD's board held a meeting and decided that the Robb Elementary School building would no longer be used as a school, with students and staff moving to a new campus. Superintendent Harrel announced that Robb Elementary School would never be reopened, out of concern for the potential to re-traumatize surviving students and staff or the wider community.

On June 21, Mayor McLaughlin announced that the Robb Elementary School building would be demolished.

The UCISD board of trustees approved the plans for a new elementary school in April 2023, and construction began later that year. The new building is located adjacent to Dalton Elementary School in Uvalde which forms a campus that serves students from pre-K through fourth grade. The new school opened in fall 2025 under the name Legacy Elementary.

=== Potential copycat threats ===
In the wake of the shooting, Donna Independent School District, which serves Donna, Texas, an area approximately 234 miles (377 km) from Uvalde, received a "credible threat of violence". In response, the district canceled school while it investigated the threat. On June 7, the Department of Homeland Security warned, "Individuals in online forums that routinely promulgate domestic violent extremist and conspiracy theory-related content have praised [this shooting] and encouraged copycat attacks", while others tried to "spread disinformation and incite grievances, including claims it was a government-staged event meant to advance gun control measures". On August 8, 2023, a 17-year-old cousin of Salvador Ramos was arrested and charged with making a terroristic threat to the public for allegedly claiming to his sister that he was planning on "doing the same thing as his cousin". One of Ramos's girlfriends was arrested in 2023 for making repeated threats to the Uvalde community.

=== Departures of other officers ===
After the shooting, Texas state trooper Crimson Elizondo was investigated by her agency, the Texas Department of Public Safety, for actions during the shooting that were "inconsistent with training and Department requirements." In August 2022, Elizondo resigned from the Texas Department of Public Safety. On October 5, 2022, CNN reported that Elizondo had been hired as a UCISD police officer. CNN also reported on Elizondo's actions during the shooting, stating that she had been "one of the first officers to respond" to the scene, "but does not retrieve any tactical body armor or her long rifle, as officers are trained to do", and "walked inside the building briefly but mostly stood outside" during the shooting. CNN further cited that Elizondo is heard on body camera video telling other officers that: "If my son had been in there, I would not have been outside ... I promise you that." On October 6, 2022, Elizondo was fired from the UCISD, which cited that "Elizondo's statement in the audio is not consistent with the District's expectations."

In late October 2022, Texas state trooper Sergeant Juan Maldonado was fired from the Texas Department of Public Safety; CNN reported that he was one of the first responding law enforcement officers, having arrived on the scene within five minutes of the start of the mass shooting.

On November 14, 2022, CNN reported on audio and video of the actions of Uvalde Police Department's acting police chief, Lieutenant Mariano Pargas, during the shooting, stating that at 12:16 p.m. Pargas made a call and asked a dispatcher "how many are still alive" in Room 112, with the dispatcher telling him: "Eight to nine are still alive"; at 12:17 p.m. Pargas tells a Border Patrol officer that there are injured victims; at 12:18 p.m. Pargas does not mention children to a Texas Ranger discussing the flow of information. On November 17, 2022, Pargas retired from the Uvalde Police Department, two days before the Uvalde city council would discuss whether he should be fired.

In January 2023, Christopher Ryan Kindell was fired from the Texas Rangers due to failing to treat the gunman as an active shooter; Kindell has appealed the firing. In August 2024, the Texas Department of Public Safety reinstated Kindell to his previous duty.

In September 2023, the Texas Department of Public Safety stated that its internal investigation had concluded, and with no more officers to be punished.

=== Criticism of police ===
In January 2024, the Department of Justice released a report criticizing several failures of the Uvalde Police Department, including a failure to recognize the active shooter situation, a failure to take "courageous action", failure to secure the crime scene, failure to establish standard operating procedures and failure to communicate with families. One parent of a survivor of the shooting said that since the report had been released, his family and other families of victims and survivors had been harassed by Uvalde police, who would pull them over arbitrarily and were trying to make them leave town.

== Law enforcement failures and controversies ==
=== Confronting the shooter ===
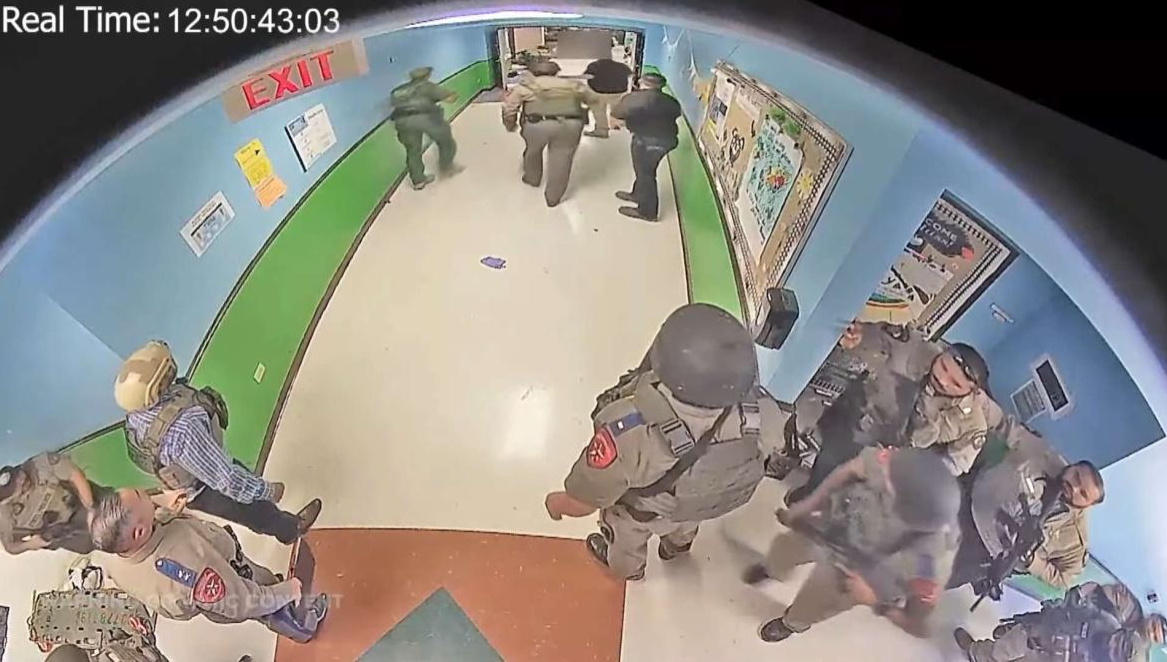
CCTV image of police officers in the hallway

Almost 400 law enforcement officers, including 150 U.S. Border Patrol agents and 91 Texas DPS officers, came to Uvalde during the shooting. Before tactical units arrived, police officers inside the school, who numbered at least 19, made "no effort" to breach the room where Ramos was located, according to the Texas Department of Public Safety (DPS). According to the DPS, the decision to wait for tactical units to arrive was based on the false belief that Ramos had been isolated to a classroom where he could do no more harm. This decision was made by the incident commander, identified as Pedro Arredondo, UCISD's chief of police.

Police arrested and handcuffed one mother who drove to the school after hearing about the shooting, which prevented her from trying to save her children. Body camera footage also shows one of the officers, Ruben Ruiz, being held back by other officers and prevented from rescuing his wife (a Robb Elementary teacher), who was inside one of the classrooms, dying of a gunshot wound. Ruiz later resigned from his position in the police department.

At a May 26 press conference, when asked whether first responders had erred in waiting for reinforcements, DPS official Victor Escalon said he did not "have enough information to answer that question yet". In a media interview on the same day, DPS spokesman Chris Olivarez said that if law enforcement "proceeded any further not knowing where the suspect was at, they could've been shot, they could've been killed, and that gunman would have had an opportunity to kill other people inside that school". Uvalde's police chief Daniel Rodriguez defended his officers in a May 26 statement, saying, "It is important for our community to know that our officers responded within minutes". Former Austin and Houston's police chief Art Acevedo tweeted, "We don't have all of the particulars right now, but when gunfire is ringing out with (sic), police are trained, expected, and required to engage, engage, engage. This is a moral and ethical obligation". On May 27, the DPS acknowledged several law enforcement errors that potentially led to greater bloodshed. At a news conference, Steven C. McCraw, the DPS director, said, "[With] the benefit of hindsight where I'm sitting now, of course it was not the right decision. It was the wrong decision. Period".

On June 2, Texas state senator Roland Gutierrez said that he heard from the Commission on State Emergency Communications that Arredondo did not know of 9-1-1 calls being made by children trapped in a classroom with Ramos. Gutierrez said the Uvalde Police Department was "receiving the 9-1-1 calls for 45 minutes ... while 19 officers were sitting in a hallway ... We don't know if it was being communicated to those people or not". On June 3, Gutierrez said that he heard from DPS that Arredondo had no radio during the shooting. On June 9, The New York Times determined through an investigative review that police officers were aware that there were injured individuals trapped inside classrooms before they decided to breach the entrance.

On June 18, San Antonio Express-News, citing a law enforcement source close to the investigation into the shooting, reported that surveillance video showed that law enforcement did not physically try to open the door to the classrooms Ramos was in for 77 minutes before law enforcement's eventual entry. The surveillance video showed Ramos firing inside classrooms 111 and 112, briefly returning into the hallway, and then going back into the classrooms, said the source; Ramos then shot through the closed door, prompting law enforcement to retreat. San Antonio Express-News reported that law enforcement "might have assumed the door was locked", while their source relayed investigators' belief that Ramos could not have locked the classroom door from the inside; investigators are still determining whether the classroom door was unlocked all along, which may have been caused by a lock malfunction. The source also said that law enforcement, for the entire time, possessed a Halligan tool that could have breached a locked classroom door. The source added that Pete Arredondo had tried various keys not on the classroom door to classrooms 111 and 112 where Ramos was in, but on other classrooms nearby in an attempt to identify a master key.

On June 21, Steve McCraw, Texas Department of Public Safety Director, testified during the Texas Senate Committee Meeting on the Uvalde School Shooting that the police response was an "abject failure and antithetical to everything we have learned over the past two decades" and that the police could have stopped the shooter in three minutes. His statements were the strongest condemnations by Texas state law enforcement of the police response at Uvalde thus far. In particular, McCraw singled out Uvalde school district police Chief Pete Arredondo, whom he identified as the on-scene commander at the incident. McCraw said, "The only thing stopping a hallway of dedicated officers from entering Room 111 and 112 was the on-scene commander who decided to place the lives of officers before the lives of children."

On July 17, the Texas House Investigative Committee released a 77-page report on "systemic failures and egregiously poor decision making" that exacerbated the shooting, and criticized state and federal officials and agencies in addition to local police. The report said a total of 376 law enforcement officials responded to the shooting, including 149 Border Patrol agents and 91 state police officers. According to The New York Times, the report found that the Uvalde Police chief knew that a child had made 911 calls from inside a classroom, but that "none of the officers who learned of the calls advocated for 'shifting to an active shooter-style response or otherwise acting more urgently to breach the classrooms.'"

=== Inaccurate initial statements by Texas authorities ===
Officials, including Texas Governor Greg Abbott and Texas DPS director Steve C. McCraw, gave inaccurate and incomplete initial accounts of the shooting. In many ways, new information from the authorities directly contradicted previous accounts from officials. On May 26, Representative Joaquin Castro of Texas said that state officials "provided conflicting accounts" that contradicted witnesses and called for the FBI to investigate and provide a full account of the incident.

On May 24, Abbott said Ramos had used a handgun and possibly a rifle during the shooting. The claim that Ramos used a handgun was inaccurate. On May 25, Abbott said only one rifle was used during the shooting. Meanwhile, DPS official Erick Estrada said on May 24 that Ramos had "body armor on", but he was later contradicted by DPS official Christopher Olivarez, who said that Ramos was wearing a tactical vest that typically carries magazines, but had no ballistic panels.

On May 25, two DPS officials, Olivarez and Travis Considine, separately said that a school police officer confronted Ramos outside the school, that the two exchanged gunfire, wounding the school police officer, and that Ramos then entered the school. Later on May 25, McCraw said that a school police officer "engaged" Ramos without firing any shots. On May 26, DPS official Victor Escalon said there had been no confrontation between Ramos and a school police officer, and that Ramos had "walked in [to the school] unobstructed", with no "readily available and armed" officer present. On May 27, McCraw said that the school police officer was not at the school when the incident started, but he drove there during the incident, "drove right by" Ramos, and mistakenly confronted a teacher.

On May 25, McCraw, without giving a specific timeline, said law enforcement "engaged immediately. They contained [the gunman] in the classroom, and put the tactical stack together in a very orderly way and breached". McCraw also said on that day that law enforcement "engaged the active shooter and continued to keep him pinned down in that location, until a tactical team" was assembled to breach the room to kill Ramos. On May 26, Escalon said law enforcement had delayed an assault on Ramos because they required "specialty equipment", "body armor", and "precision riflemen, negotiators". Escalon introduced the claim that there had been "negotiations", saying Ramos "did not respond" and "there wasn't much gunfire [during negotiations] other than trying to keep the officers at bay".

On May 26, McCraw claimed that Ramos entered the school from a door "propped open by a teacher". On May 31, a lawyer for the teacher said that the teacher had in fact closed the door after seeing Ramos, having pulled and held the door closed while telling 9-1-1 about the shooting; the teacher "thought the door would lock because that door is always supposed to be locked". Later on May 31, Considine acknowledged that the teacher had indeed closed the door before Ramos entered, but the door "did not lock as it should". On June 21, McCraw stated that the school entrance door could only be locked from the outside, and that the teacher was unaware of that.

On May 27, Abbott said at a press conference that he was "misled" and given "inaccurate" information by law enforcement agencies, adding, "I'm absolutely livid about that." CNN reported that Uvalde Mayor, Don McLaughlin, who sat by Abbott at the press conference, was "left as dumbfounded as the governor by the changing stories of law enforcement".

On June 21, McCraw stated that the classroom door had not been locked by the gunman; the classroom door could only be locked from the outside, not from the inside, and a teacher had reported before the shooting that the classroom door's lock was broken.

=== City Hall meeting with Steve McCraw on June 2 ===
On June 2, nine days after the mass shooting, there was a private meeting at Uvalde City Hall. The gathering was arranged by Governor Greg Abbott's office, due to "rising tensions between Uvalde officials." Abbott's general counsel and his chief of staff Luis Saenz were both in attendance as mediators. Various Uvalde civic leaders were also present, including mayor Don McLaughlin, county judge Bill Mitchell, local district attorney Christina Mitchell Busbee, county attorney John Dodson, local police officials, Uvalde assistant city manager Joe Cardenas, and Uvalde city attorney Paul Tarski.

During the meeting, a one-page document titled "narrative" was given to McCraw, the state's top police official. This was presented to him by city attorney Paul Tarski. Uvalde city officials then pressured McCraw to publicly endorse their storyline and hold a press conference in which he was asked to change his depiction of events into a version more favorable to their liking: one in which "the quick arrival of officers at the school" would be promoted, highlighting "their success in containing the gunman." The "narrative" document was made available to The New York Times following a public information request.

The city claimed, "There was zero hesitation on any of these officers' part, they moved directly toward the gunfire" and "The total number of persons saved by the heroes that are local law enforcement and the other assisting agencies is over 500." The document defended the delayed police response prior to final confrontation with the gunman, stating that time was "not wasted but each minute was used to save lives of children and teachers" and that "Absent the shields, every U.P.D. officer was of the opinion that breaching the door was suicide." According to The New York Times, "Some of the footage from the scene raises questions about the city's account. Video from the hallway of Robb Elementary ... made clear that shields began arriving in the hallway outside the classrooms long before the officers moved in."

The city's description of events also conflicted with McCraw's previous statements to the public, in which he portrayed a scene where officers had not adhered to standard training procedures. The hour-long meeting was "heated", and voices were raised. McCraw refused to endorse the city's narrative as presented to him, saying that he disagreed with their summary. District attorney Busbee also objected to the city's narrative and argued her point with the Uvalde city attorney, saying she was "concerned with the release of inaccurate or incomplete information."

== Responses ==
=== Ramos's parents ===
Ramos's mother said that she had no explanation for her son's attack on the school but that he "had his reasons for doing what he did and please don't judge him. I only want the innocent children who died to forgive me." His father apologized for his son's actions and said, "He should've just killed me, you know, instead of doing something like that."

=== Survivors and families ===
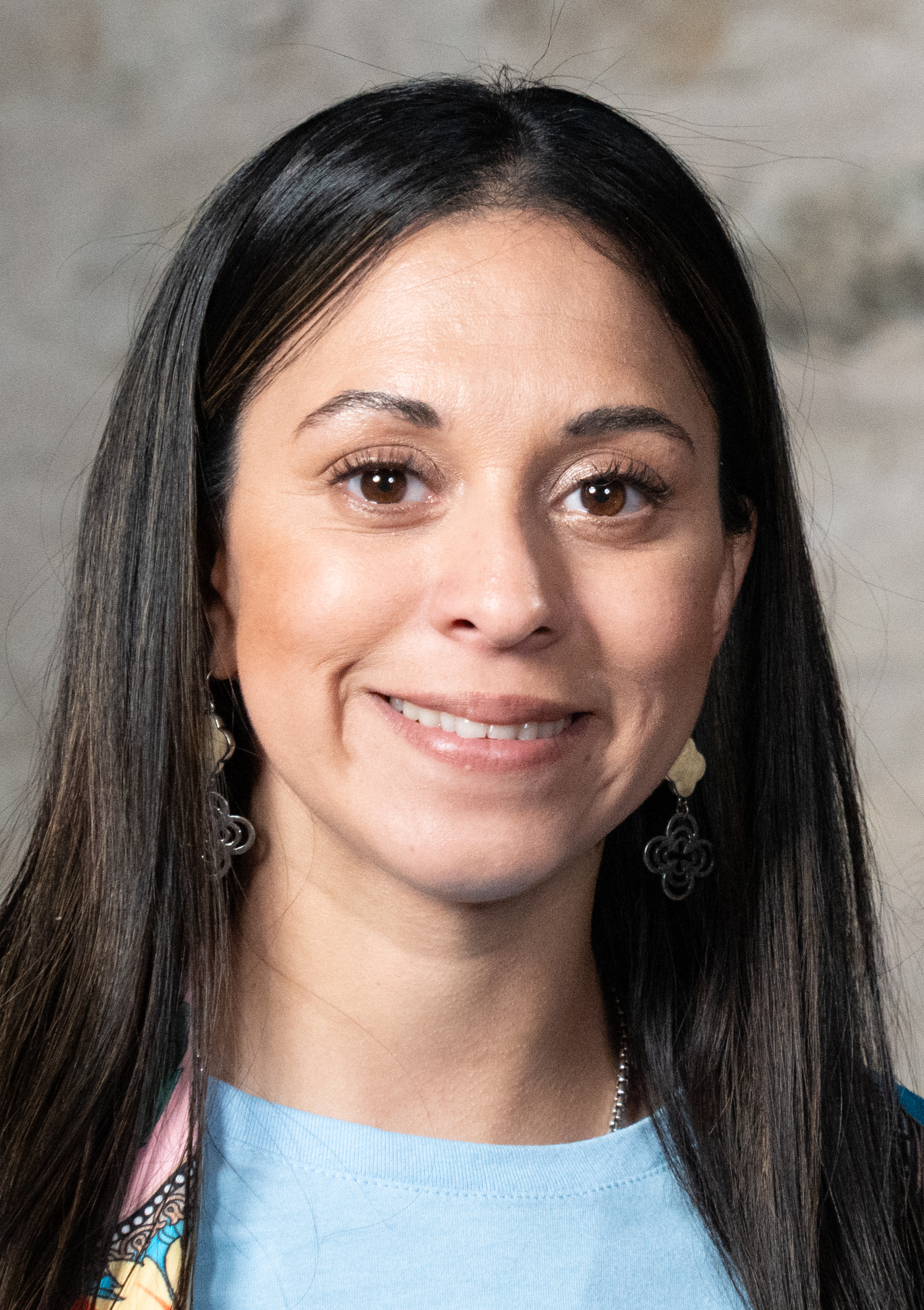
Gomez in 2025

Arnulfo Reyes, the teacher in classroom 111 who lost all 11 of his students present during the shooting, was shot in the arm, lung, and back. Reyes labeled law enforcement as "cowards" for their response during the shooting, saying: "They sit there and did nothing for our community. They took a long time to go in." He also said: "After everything, I get more angry because you [law enforcement] have a bulletproof vest, I have nothing." He commented that no training "gets you ready for this. We trained our kids to sit under the table... but we set them up to be like ducks... You can give us all the training you want, but gun laws have to change... I will go anywhere to the end of the world to not let my students die in vain... I will go to the end of the world to make sure things get changed."

Survivors, family members of survivors, and victims spoke to a Congressional panel, the United States House Committee on Oversight and Reform, about two weeks after the shooting. The testimony was done prior to the House debating a bill on June 8 that would raise the minimum age to 21 to purchase certain firearms and toughen prohibitions on untraceable guns. Multiple survivors from the shooting have expressed their fear of returning to school, and have spoken with media outlets to recount their experiences. Some gathered together and formed the organization "Lives Robbed", a non-profit organization that is aimed at bringing forward changes in gun legislation.

Angeli Gomez, who was handcuffed by police when she ran into the school to rescue her children, was later interviewed by CBS News. She said that she was on probation from charges from a decade prior, and that law enforcement contacted her after the shooting to warn her not to publicize her story because she could face charges for obstruction of justice. Her lawyer later said that she had been harassed by police in two instances, the first when police conducted a traffic stop on her vehicle and falsely accused her of harboring illegal immigrants in it, and the second when a police vehicle stopped outside her home for around 45 minutes and flashed its lights at her and her mother. A special report by the Uvalde Leader News reported that Gomez's claim of being handcuffed was false after an investigation into the actions of Gomez. Gomez has not responded to the news article.

=== Reactions from politicians ===
President Joe Biden addresses the nation about the shooting on May 24, 2022.

President Joe Biden ordered flags at federal buildings to be flown at half-staff. In a televised address to the nation on May 24, Biden highlighted that other countries have "mental health problems", "domestic disputes", and "people who are lost, but these kinds of mass shootings never happen with the kind of frequency they happen in America. Why? Why are we willing to live with this carnage?" Biden said that he was "sick and tired" of mass shootings, declaring "we have to act", and calling for "common sense" gun laws. Biden also spoke to Texas Governor Greg Abbott to offer assistance, according to Biden's communications director.

On May 25, Abbott held a press conference where he described the shooting as "evil", "intolerable", and "unacceptable". Abbott continued by saying the shooting "could have been worse" if not for the actions of law enforcement, who he described as having provided a "quick response" and showed "amazing courage by running toward gunfire". He proceeded to blame the shooting on "a problem with mental health illness" in the local community, while saying in the same speech that Ramos had no known criminal or mental health history. During the press conference, Beto O'Rourke, the Democratic nominee in the 2022 Texas gubernatorial election, confronted Abbott by telling him, "You said this was not predictable – this was totally predictable, and you choose not to do anything." Don McLaughlin, the Republican mayor of Uvalde since 2014, told O'Rourke to leave the press conference, calling him a "sick son of a bitch" who was making "a political issue", before O'Rourke was escorted out of the auditorium. O'Rourke later criticized Abbott for reducing mental health services in the state and expanding gun access to 18-year-olds.

The shooting was condemned by former presidents Bill Clinton, Barack Obama, and Donald Trump. Senator Susan Collins (R-ME) described the shooting as an "unbelievably tragic and horrible crime", and she expressed support for red flag laws that help restrict potentially violent individuals from accessing firearms. Senator Ted Cruz (R-TX) called the shooting "yet another act of evil and mass murder". He offered his prayers to the families and children affected by the shooting, and he said that the country has seen "too many of these shootings". Senator Ron Johnson (R-WI) reacted by blaming school shootings in the U.S. on "wokeness", "CRT", and "liberal indoctrination". Texas Attorney General Ken Paxton said that his message for grieving families in Uvalde was: "I believe God always has a plan. Life is short no matter what it is. And certainly, we're not going to make sense of [the killing of children]".

Partly based on a rumor started by an anonymous user on the /pol/ imageboard on 4chan, Representative Paul Gosar (R-AZ) made unsubstantiated claims, on Twitter the day after the shooting, that the perpetrator was a "transsexual leftist illegal alien"; the tweet was taken down within two hours. The false claims were further spread by Representative Marjorie Taylor Greene (R-GA) and other far-right House Republicans and conservative media figures and social media users, despite authorities identifying Ramos as an American citizen.

Internationally, the shooting was condemned by various governments and politicians, including by the government of Mexico, which said it was working with American authorities to identify Mexican victims. Mexican consul Ismail Naveja responded by going to Uvalde on the day of the shooting, and Mexico said it was providing consular assistance for Mexican nationals. President Andrés Manuel López Obrador commented on the Hispanic origin of the majority of the victims, noting, "Just look at the surnames; they are children, grandchildren of Mexicans... it hurts us a lot." British Prime Minister Boris Johnson and Leader of the Opposition Keir Starmer both paid tribute to the victims in the House of Commons of the United Kingdom.

The shooting was denounced, among others, by Australian Prime Minister Anthony Albanese, Canadian Prime Minister Justin Trudeau, Chinese diplomat Wang Wenbin, the European Union ambassador to the United States Stavros Lambrinidis, French President Emmanuel Macron, German Chancellor Olaf Scholz, Israeli Prime Minister Naftali Bennett, New Zealand Prime Minister Jacinda Ardern, Ukrainian President Volodymyr Zelenskyy, United Nations Secretary-General António Guterres, and Pope Francis. The human-rights group Amnesty International said, "Among wealthier, developed countries, the U.S. is an outlier when it comes to firearm violence. U.S. governments have allowed gun violence to become a human rights crisis." Gérard Araud, the former French ambassador to the United States during the Obama and Trump administrations, said it was a "craziness without any prospect of improvement".

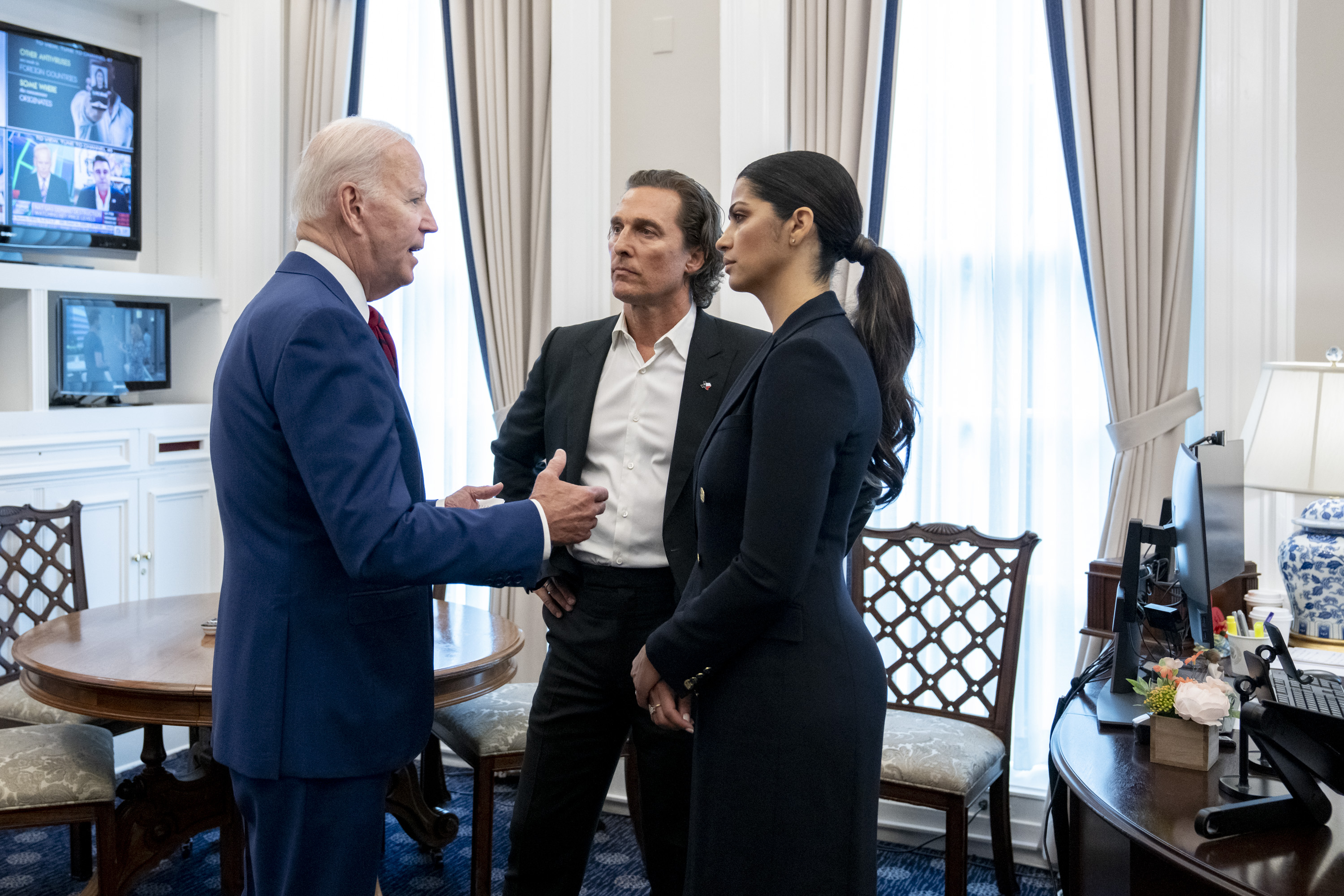
McConaughey and his wife Camila conversing with President Joe Biden at the White House on June 7, 2022

Actor Matthew McConaughey, who was born in Uvalde, has also expressed his sympathy towards the victims and families. After the incident, McConaughey visited the White House to push for stricter gun laws and mental health reform.

=== Resulting gun control discussions ===
==== Political ====
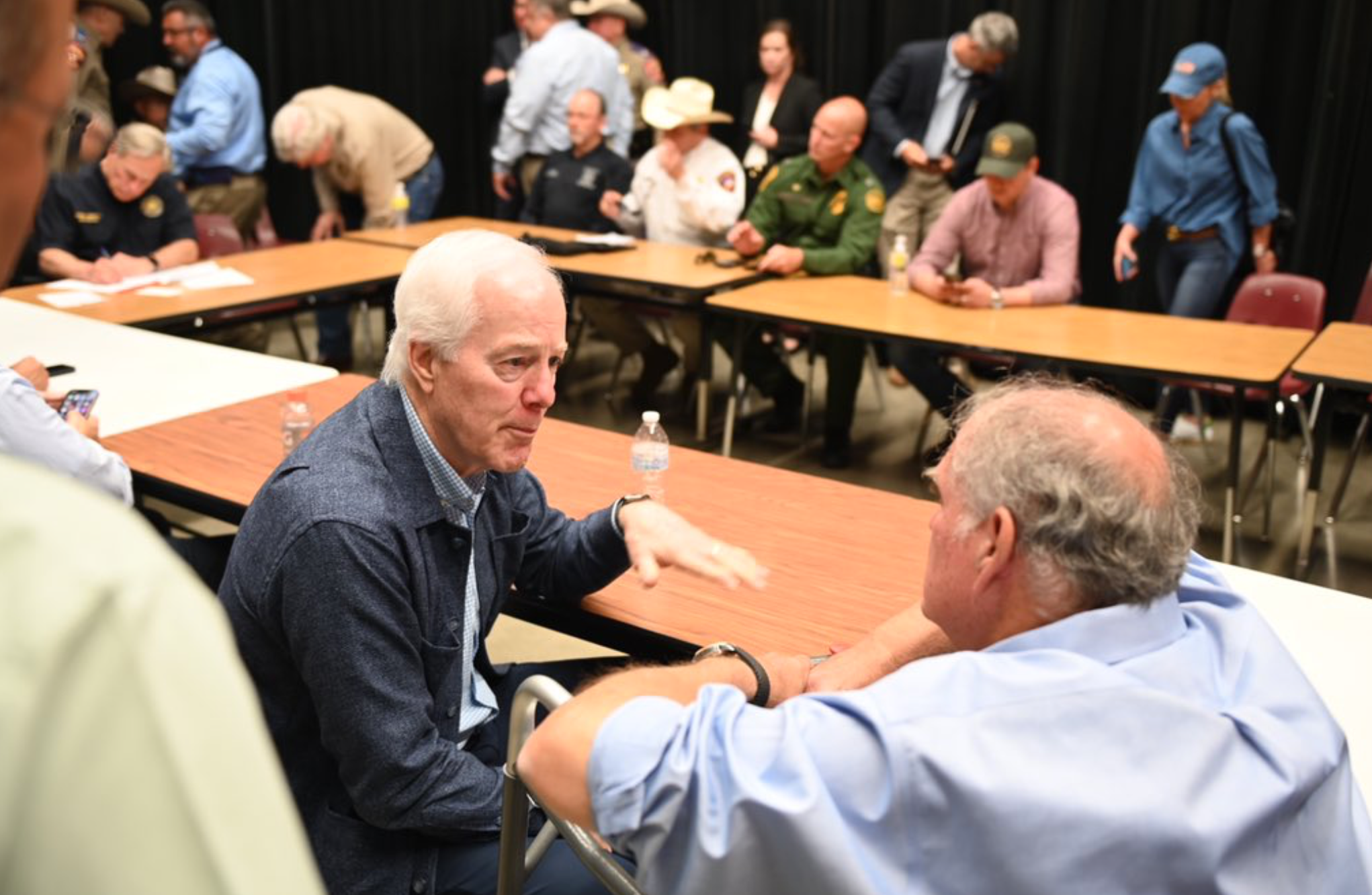
Texas Senator John Cornyn meeting with local Uvalde leaders

President Biden delivered a speech on the shooting and asked, "When in God's name are we going to stand up to the gun lobby?". His lack of a concrete plan attracted controversy from gun control activists. In a speech given on the night of the shooting, Vice President Kamala Harris reacted to the shooting by calling for policy changes to prevent similar shootings. Senate Majority Leader Chuck Schumer called for the U.S. to pass stricter gun control measures, and he urged Republican members of Congress to resist influence from the National Rifle Association of America (NRA), a gun-rights lobby that have long been blamed for USA lawmakers' resistance to supporting gun control.

Top Texas Republican officials, such as Abbott, Lieutenant Governor Dan Patrick, Texas House Speaker Dade Phelan of Beaumont, Attorney General Ken Paxton, Representative Tony Gonzales of San Antonio, and Senators Cornyn and Cruz, resisted the possibility of more comprehensive gun control measures. Abbott said that tougher gun regulations were "not a real solution". Instead of gun control, many Senate Republicans called for increasing security presence in schools, limiting entryways into schools, and arming teachers and other school officials.

Republican Senator Ron Johnson promoted the Luke and Alex Safety Act, a bill to create a national database of school safety practices, but was silent on whether he was receding from his longstanding opposition to universal background checks. Johnson's move to advance his bill by unanimous consent was blocked, with Schumer saying that the Senate was "going to vote on gun legislation" through consideration of the Domestic Terrorism Prevention Act, and that Johnson's proposal could be considered as part of that process. Senator Cruz said that some politicians would politicize the shooting to push for stricter gun reforms. Users on social media accused Cruz of hypocrisy for accepting money from gun interest groups, and for planning to speak at the NRA's annual meeting being held in Houston with Abbott and Cornyn.

==== NRA and Daniel Defense ====
The National Rifle Association Institute for Legislative Action (NRA-ILA) annual leadership forum on May 27 in Houston drew heavy criticism in light of the recent shooting. Former President Donald Trump, governors Kristi Noem and Greg Abbott, Texas Lieutenant Governor Dan Patrick, senators Ted Cruz and John Cornyn, and Representative Dan Crenshaw were previously scheduled to give remarks. Cornyn and Crenshaw subsequently canceled their attendances, and Abbott announced that he would instead appear at a news conference in Uvalde and send pre-recorded remarks to the NRA convention.

Daniel Defense, the manufacturer of a firearm used in the shooting, decided not to attend. At the event, Trump and other Republicans rejected gun reforms, with Senator Cruz blaming mass shootings in the U.S. on a "cultural sickness" based on fatherless children and an alleged link between violence and video games, and advocated for arming teachers and redesigning schools to have only one entrance and exit. Gun safety advocacy groups such as Moms Demand Action and March for Our Lives, as well as local teachers' unions, Black Lives Matter chapters, the Harris County Democratic Party, and Beto O'Rourke protested outside the convention.

Gun manufacturer Daniel Defense was the target of social media criticism in the wake of the shooting, including criticism of a since-deleted Twitter post made on May 16 depicting a child holding a Daniel Defense rifle, causing the company to make many of its social media accounts private.

==== Mass shooting survivors and families ====
Manuel Oliver, a gun control activist and the father of a Stoneman Douglas High School shooting victim, issued a statement expressing his outrage, and said that the families of the victims do not need the thoughts and prayers of politicians; instead, they "need their kids". Several families of the Sandy Hook Elementary School shooting victims spoke out, with several calling for stricter gun control. Fred Guttenberg, whose daughter was killed during the Stoneman Douglas High School shooting, also called for politicians to enact stricter gun control, and expressed support for the families of Robb Elementary School victims.

On June 11, March for Our Lives protests were held across the United States. Survivors of the 2021 Oxford High School shooting also expressed outrage.

==== Entertainment ====
In a press conference during the 2022 NBA playoffs, Golden State Warriors head coach Steve Kerr expressed his outrage at the refusal of American politicians to implement laws on gun control, while the Miami Heat urged their fans to contact state senators "demanding their support for common sense gun laws". The social media accounts for the New York Yankees and Tampa Bay Rays began posting facts about gun violence during a game in St. Petersburg, Florida.

The satirical newspaper The Onion republished their article " 'No Way to Prevent This,' Says Only Nation Where This Regularly Happens". This was the 21st time The Onion republished this article to its homepage, coincidentally the same number as the number of victims of the Uvalde shooting.

In the wake of the school shooting, CBS pulled the FBI season four finale, an episode titled "Prodigal Son" (which centered on an investigation into a school shooting plot), from the evening's planned airing, and replaced it with a rerun of an earlier Season 4 episode ("Under Pressure," which originally aired February 1) in its place. The episode would later air on October 4, as part of the show's fifth season.

Similarly, Lifetime announced that the airing of television movie, The Bad Seed Returns, which was scheduled to air on May 30, 2022 would be postponed following the shooting. The movie eventually aired on September 5, 2022.

MSNBC aired a special episode of The 11th Hour with Stephanie Ruhle titled "Enough Is Enough" that discussed gun culture in the United States three days after shooting.

=== Legal proceedings ===
==== Grand jury proceedings over law enforcement ====
In late 2023, Uvalde County District Attorney Christina Mitchell convened a grand jury to evaluate whether or not enforcement could be held criminally responsible for their response on the day of the shooting. One day after the release of the U.S. Department of Justice's report in January 2024, the grand jury began hearing testimony. Texas Department of Public Safety (DPS) Director Col. Steve McCraw testified before the grand jury in February. Multiple law enforcement officers, including officers from DPS, were also subpoenaed to testify. The jury also toured Robb Elementary School for about an hour in June. On June 27, 2024, the grand jury indicted first Uvalde school district police chief Pedro Arredondo and another former officer, Adrian Gonzales, on charges of child endangerment, a state felony. Arredono was charged with 10 counts of child endangerment, Gonzales with 29 counts. The same day, Arrendano was arrested and booked into the Uvalde jail, and was then released after posting a $10,000 surety bond and nine $10,000 personal recognizance bonds. On June 28, Gonzalez was arrested after turning himself in, and was then released after posting a $10,000 bail. Both officers faced up to two years in prison and a $10,000 fine if they were convicted.

On July 18, 2024, Arredondo pled not guilty to all 10 of his child endangerment charges. As of January 2026, Arredondo's trial still remains unscheduled, with his pretrial hearings also being paused after the prosecution was accused of withholding information following a key witness' decision to change their testimony. On July 25, 2024, Gonzalez pled not guilty to all 29 of his child endangerment counts as well. On January 21, 2026, Gonzales was acquitted of all 29 charges.

==== Lawsuits towards gun manufacturers and others ====
A Uvalde staff member filed a petition for information about Daniel Defense on June 2, attempting to make a prima facie case against the gunmaker for its marketing of the weapons. The staff member had been outside delivering food to the school for an end-of-year party when she witnessed a car crash. She then had gone inside to grab her cellphone to call 9-1-1 about the crash and had propped open a door to the school with a rock but had kicked the door shut when she ran inside after witnessing the shooter hopping a fence and coming towards the school. This was one part of the misrepresented details that were published after the shooting.

On June 3, a parent of one of the deceased victims filed a letter seeking documents and records from Daniel Defense through lawyers that had represented families of victims of the 2012 Sandy Hook Elementary School shooting against the manufacturer of the rifle used in the shooting. On June 7, attorney Thomas J. Henry filed a lawsuit, on behalf of four families of students injured in the shooting, against Ramos' estate and sought answers about how he had gained access to the school. Henry said that the initial lawsuit would allow them to discover evidence and potentially add other parties to the lawsuit, with the discovery process focused on the school system, law enforcement, social media, and the gun and ammunition manufacturers.

On November 28, 2022, the family of victim Eliahna Torres, including her mother, Sandra, filed a lawsuit alongside Everytown for Gun Safety against gun manufacturer Daniel Defense and gun store Oasis Outback, as well as two dozen additional people and entities. The lawsuit alleged that Daniel Defense markets its AR-15–style rifle by "using militaristic imagery and video game references, by marketing on various social media platforms, and by suggesting that its rifles can be used by civilians for offensive combat-style operations against non-combatants", as well as accusations of unfair marketing tactics and violation of the Federal Trade Commission Act. Oasis Outback, which delivered the rifle used in the attack to Ramos, was accused of negligent transfer of firearms as well as the fact that the store "had a duty not to sell weapons to the just-turned 18-year-old shooter, who it knew or reasonably should have known was likely to harm himself or others". Ramos was described by witnesses as "nervous" and "behaving suspiciously" while inside the store. Furthermore, the lawsuit filed charges on the accusation of a "failed law enforcement response", claiming that Eliahna's Fourth and Fourteenth Amendment rights were violated when she and her fellow students and teachers were involuntarily confined within their classrooms, accompanying additional unlawful seizure and lack of due process accusations towards the law enforcement defendants.

Families from the nineteen victims from the shootings filed three separate lawsuits in May 2024. One suit was seeking $500 million in damages from Texas state police officiers for their botched response to the shooting. The second suit was against Daniel Defense for the manufacturing of the gun used in the shooting. The third suit, filed in California, was against Meta Platforms and Activision Blizzard, claiming that Meta's Instagram and Activision's Call of Duty games had indoctrined the shooter towards gun violence.

=== Legislative action ===
==== Canada ====
Starting on May 26, Prime Minister Justin Trudeau and the Liberal Party of Canada took steps in proposing new firearms regulations, including a freeze on handgun sales on October 24.

==== United States ====
On June 6, the state of New York passed a new law raising the age from 18 to 21 for people to be able to buy semi-automatic weapons.

On May 19, 2023, Texas passed a law requiring members of law enforcement to undergo sixteen hours of training every two years on school shooting response.

==== Protecting Our Kids Act ====
On June 2, the United States House Committee on the Judiciary proposed the Protecting Our Kids Act. The bill notably excludes an assault weapons ban but includes other measures, such as banning those under 21 from purchasing semi-automatic rifles and the import, sale, manufacture, transfer, or possession of high-capacity magazines, requiring bump stocks to be registered under the National Firearms Act and banning them for civilian use. It also redefines receiver blanks to require background checks on all sales, strengthens federal offenses for gun trafficking and straw purchases, creates a compensated buyback program between local governments and individuals surrendering such magazines, along with a new tax credit for the sale of safe storage device at home, and penalizes violations of new safe storage requirements on residences. The House later passed the bill, but it then failed to pass the Senate. The International Association of Chiefs of Police and the Fraternal Order of Police wrote to congressional leadership offering to help work on gun measures.

==== Bipartisan Safer Communities Act ====
On June 23, the Senate passed the Bipartisan Safer Communities Act with bipartisan support in a 65–33 vote. 15 Senate Republicans voted to support it.

On June 24, the House of Representatives passed the Bipartisan Safer Communities Act with bipartisan support in a 234–193 vote. House Republican leaders opposed the bill and called for other House Republicans to similarly oppose, but 14 House Republicans still voted to support.

On June 25, President Joe Biden signed the Bipartisan Safer Communities Act into law. It was the most significant federal gun reform legislation in almost 30 years, since the Brady Bill of 1993 and the since-expired Federal Assault Weapons Ban of 1994.

==== School Safety Bill ====
On March 8, 2023, H.B. 3 was introduced to the Texas House of Representatives who passed the bill in a 119–25 vote on April 25, 2023. The following day, Senate received the bill and passed it on March 21, leading to its signing by Governor Abbot on June 14, 2023.

On September 1, 2023, the bill that focused on allocating funds toward school safety budgets/upgrades including the implementation of armed officers was made effective.

==== Uvalde Strong Act ====
On April 28, 2025, the Uvalde Strong Act that focused on enforcing training to improve police/EMS response to school shootings was passed in the house in a 147–0 vote after its proposal from a State Representative who was the mayor of Uvalde in years prior to and during the year of the shooting.

On May 19, 2025, the act was passed unanimously by the Senate after its proposal from the Uvalde Senate representative, leading to its intended signing by Governor Abbott.

==== United States legislative action table ====
Name	Passed House?	Passed Senate?	Year	Purpose
Protecting Our Kids Act (H.R. 7910)	Yes	No	2022	21+ firearm purchasing age restriction; increased firearm device regulation
Bipartisan Safer Communities Act (S.2938)	Yes	Yes	2022	mental health services funding; red flag program funding; school safety funding
School Safety Bill (H.B. 3)	Yes	Yes	2023	increase presence of school security officers; school security inspections
"Raise the Age" Bill (H.B. 2744)	No	No	2023	21+ semi-automatic rifle-purchasing age restriction
Uvalde Strong Act (H.B. 33)	Yes	Yes	2025	increase required training for response to school shootings, including but not limited to: emergency medical services/technicians, law enforcement, police departments, etc.

== Legacy ==
Multiple memorials were held in Uvalde and across Texas in commemoration for the victims for the one year anniversary of the shooting on May 24, 2023. Survivors, family members and supporters gathered for events such as a 77-minute vigil (the amount of time waited outside the classroom by authorities), candlelight vigils, butterfly release, and mariachi performances. President Biden spoke about the anniversary at the White House with 21 candles at the base of the White House Grand Staircase, and spoke about his frustration at a lack of change in gun policy. Similar frustration was echoed by survivors and family members who waited for investigations and legal cases to finish and policy to change, and many of these topics have caused anger and strife to be seen throughout Uvalde.

== Cultural depictions ==
In 2024, journalist Craig Garnett, publisher of the Uvalde Leader-News, released Uvalde's Darkest Hour through Texas A&M University Press. The book offers a detailed journalistic account of the events before, during, and after the shooting, as well as the local response and recovery efforts.

Another nonfiction volume, The School Shooting in Uvalde: Preventions, Interventions and Solutions (2024), edited by Terry C. Robinson, explores policy failures and psychological, educational, and sociopolitical aspects of school shootings.

== See also ==
- Assault weapons legislation in the United States
- Federal Assault Weapons Ban
- Gun culture in the United States
- Gun law in the United States
- Gun politics in the United States
- Gun violence in the United States

=== Lists ===
- List of attacks related to primary schools
- List of mass shootings in the United States in 2022
- List of rampage killers (school massacres)
- List of school massacres by death toll
- List of school shootings in the United States by death toll
- List of school shootings in the United States (2000–present)
- List of shootings in Texas
- List of filmed mass shootings
