= List of St. Mary's University, Texas alumni =

St. Mary's University, Texas is a Catholic university in San Antonio, Texas. Following are some of its notable alumni.

== Art ==
- Franco Mondini-Ruiz, artist

== Business ==
- Benjamin Biaggini, B.S. 1936 (deceased), former president of the Southern Pacific Company, the parent company of Southern Pacific Railroad
- William E. Greehey, B.S. 1960, founder of Valero Energy Corporation and NuStar Energy; Greehey School of Business was named in his honor in 2005
- Felix Stehling (deceased), co-founder of Taco Cabana

== Clergy ==
- Robert R. Brown, bishop of Arkansas in the Episcopal Church
- Michael Joseph Boulette, B.A. 1971, auxiliary bishop of San Antonio (2017–)
- J. Arturo Cepeda, M.A. 2001, auxiliary bishop of Detroit
- Virgilio Elizondo, Catholic priest and community activist
- Richard Gaillardetz, M.A. 1984, Joseph McCarthy Chair of Catholic Systematic Theology at Boston College
- Norma Pimentel, nun of the Missionaries of Jesus and the executive director of Catholic Charities of the Rio Grande Valley
- Bernard Ferdinand Popp, M.A. 1975, auxiliary bishop emeritus of San Antonio
- Raymond Roussin, S.M., B.A. 1960, first Marianist archbishop, archbishop of Vancouver 2004–09

== Education ==
- Theodore Albrecht, B.M.E. 1967, musicologist and faculty of Kent State University
- Max Castillo, president of the University of Houston–Downtown
- Robert Ekelund, economist and academic
- Mary Lynne Gasaway Hill, B.A. 1986, M.A. 1990, M.A. 1991, poet, writer, and professor
- Yvonne Gonzalez, former school superintendent
- José Ángel Gutiérrez 1968, attorney, co-founder of the Mexican American Youth Organization, president of Raza Unida Party, professor at the University of Texas at Arlington
- Ernest A. Raba, 1934, L.L.B. 1937 (deceased), former dean of the St. Mary's University School of Law

== Entertainment ==
- Charles Fincher, J.D. 1971, cartoonist (Thadeus & Weez)
- Larry Levinson, B.A. 1979, executive producer of more than 160 made-for-television movies
- Emilio Nicolas Sr., media executive credited with a major role in creating and developing Spanish-language television stations and networks in the United States
- Bobby Pulido, Class of 1995, Mexican-American Tejano music recording artist
- Eric Revis, jazz bassist and member of Branford Marsalis's ensemble
- John Santikos, B.A. 1949, movie theater entrepreneur

== Government and civil service ==
- Stuart Bowen, J.D. 1991, former Special Inspector General for Iraq Reconstruction (2004–2013)
- Leonel Castillo, B.A. 1961 (deceased), former Houston City comptroller, 1972, former Commissioner Immigration Naturalization Services, 1977
- Armando Falcon, former director of the Office of Federal Housing Enterprise Oversight

== Law ==
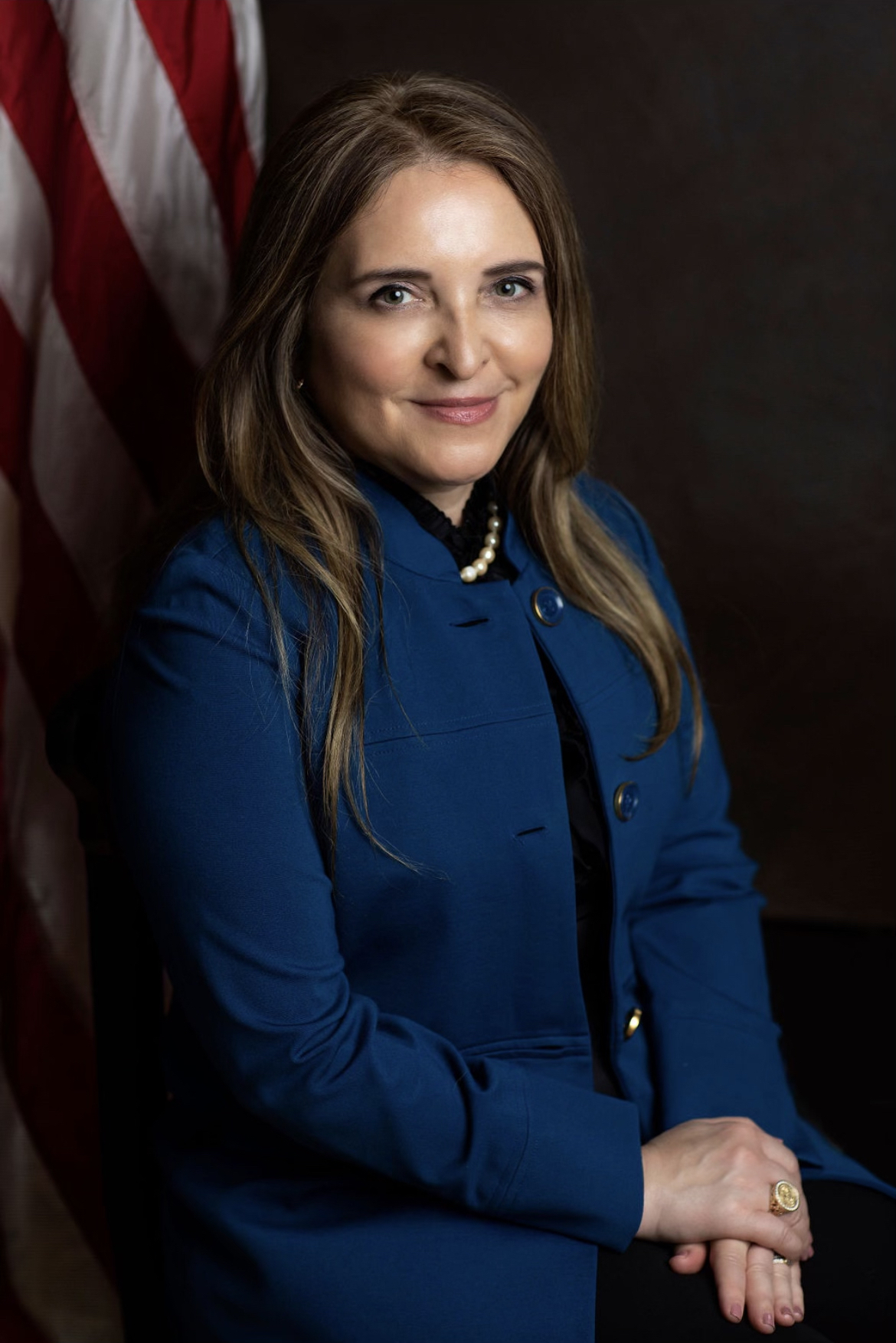
Judge Marina Marmolejo

- Hattie Elam Briscoe, LL.B. 1956 (deceased), attorney, first African American woman graduate of St. Mary's University School of Law
- David Alan Ezra, B.B.A. 1969, J.D., 1972, senior status judge, United States District Court for the Western District of Texas (by designation), former chief judge, United States District Court for the District of Hawaii
- Paul W. Green, J.D. 1977, former Texas Supreme Court justice (2004–2020)
- Thad Heartfield, B.A. 1962, J.D. 1965 (deceased), former chief judge for the United States District Court for the Eastern District of Texas (2003–2009)
- Nico LaHood, J.D. 2002, former district attorney of Bexar County, Texas (2015–2018)
- Marina Marmolejo, M.A., J.D. 1996, judge, United States District Court for the Southern District of Texas
- Mario G. Obledo, LL.B. 1960 (deceased), co-founder of the Mexican American Legal Defense and Education Fund
- Kevin Patrick Yeary, B.A. 1988, J.D. 1991, judge of the Texas Court of Criminal Appeals
- John H. Wood Jr., B.B.A 1935 (L.L.B. 1938 from the University of Texas School of Law) (deceased), former United States district judge of the United States District Court for the Western District of Texas

== Military ==
- Gabe Camarillo, under secretary of the Army and assistant secretary of the Air Force (Manpower & Reserve Affairs)
- James R. Clapper Jr., M.S. 1970, Political Science, retired lieutenant general in the United States Air Force and former director of National Intelligence
- Jon A. Hill, retired United States Navy vice admiral who last served as the director of the Missile Defense Agency
- John F. Regni retired United States Air Force lieutenant general who served as the 17th Superintendent of the United States Air Force Academy from 2005 to 2009.
- William H. Schneider, B.A. 1955 (deceased), former lieutenant general in the United States Army who served as deputy commander in chief of United States Pacific Command
- Alfred Valenzuela, B.A. 1970, M.A. 1979, United States Army major general
- Don S. Wenger, U.S. Air Force major general

== Politics ==
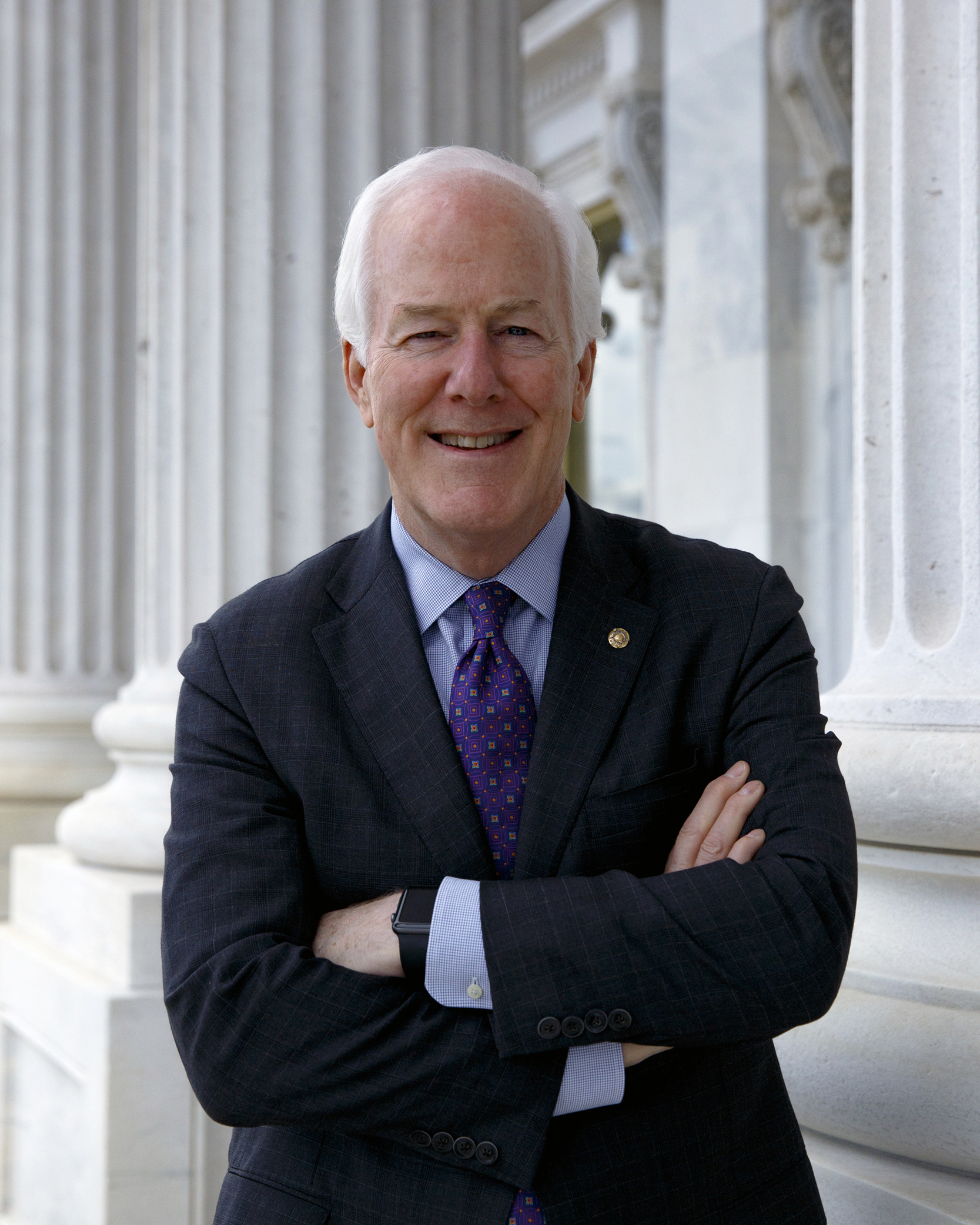
Senator John Cornyn

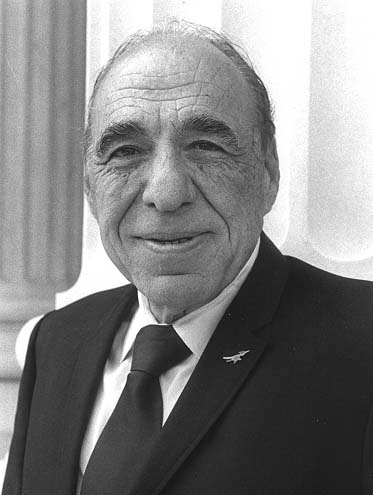
Former U.S. Congressman Henry B. Gonzalez

- Fernando Andrade, M.A. 1979, congressman at the Congress of the Republic of Peru (2011–2016) and former mayor of the Miraflores District, Lima (1996–1999 and 2003–2006)
- Tom Corbett, J.D. 1975, former governor of Pennsylvania and the state's former attorney general
- John Cornyn, J.D. 1977 (LL.M. 1995, University of Virginia School of Law), attorney, former associate justice on Texas Supreme Court, former attorney general of Texas, Republican senior United States senator from Texas, St. Mary's Distinguished Law School Graduate (1994)
- Rick Galindo, B.S. in Finance and Risk Management, c. 2003, Republican member of the Texas House of Representatives from District 117 in Bexar County
- Delia Garcia, M.A., 2004, first Latina elected to the Kansas House of Representatives, 2004, and Kansas Secretary of Labor.
- Charlie Gonzalez, J.D. 1972, former U.S. congressman (1999–2013)
- Henry B. Gonzalez, LL.B. 1943 (deceased), former U.S. congressman (1961–1999), longest serving Hispanic in Congress
- Rebecca Flores Harrington, labor activist, director of the Texas chapter of the United Farm Workers, and vice president of the national United Farm Workers
- Glenn Hegar, M.A., Texas Comptroller of Public Accounts (since 2014), former Texas state senator (2007–2014), former member of the Texas House (2003 to 2007)
- Patrick Hope, member of Virginia House of Delegates
- Peter Kinder, J.D. 1979, lieutenant governor of Missouri
- Severita Lara, Mexican-American political activist
- Robert Kennedy Lewis, member of the House of Assembly of Saint Lucia
- José Ramón Gómez Leal, Mexican politician and senator of the Republic
- Frank L. Madla, B.A. 1959, M.A. 1962, Texas state senator and representative
- Michael McCaul, J.D. 1987, U.S. congressman
- Scott McInnis, J.D. 1980, former U.S. congressman
- Rolando Pablos, former secretary of state of Texas (2017–2018)
- Ciro Rodriguez, former U.S. congressman
- Tony Sanchez, B.A. 1965, J.D. 1969, unsuccessful candidate for governor of Texas in 2002
- Frank M. Tejeda, B.A. 1970, Texas state representative, Texas state senator, U.S. congressman
- Willie Velasquez, B.A. civil rights activist, founder of Southwest Voter Registration Education Project, posthumously awarded Presidential Medal of Freedom in 1995
- Nelson Wolff, B.B.A. and J.D. 1966, Texas representative, senator, San Antonio mayor, Bexar County judge

== Science and medicine ==
- Jessica Esquivel, B.S. 2011, physicist and science communicator, working at the Muon g-2 particle physics experiment at Fermilab
- Giovanni Fazio, B.S., B.A. 1954, physicist at Harvard-Smithsonian Center for Astrophysics

== Sports ==
- Brian Anderson, broadcaster for the Milwaukee Brewers
- Ken Burmeister, college basketball coach
- Anson Dorrance, soccer coach
- Melvin Allys "Bert" Gallia, Class of 1911, former Major League Baseball pitcher for the Washington Senators, St. Louis Browns and Philadelphia Phillies
- Peter Hansen, basketball player
- Danny Heep, former Major League Baseball outfielder and 1988 World Series Champion
- Gordon Houston, minor league baseball player
- George Koch, professional football player
- Jeff Kubenka, B.A. 1996, former Major League Baseball pitcher
- Robert Reid, B.A. 1977, former National Basketball Association player for the Houston Rockets, Charlotte Hornets, Portland Trail Blazers, and Philadelphia 76ers
- Marcus Session, B.A. 2004, former National Basketball Association (pre-season) and International Basketball Federation player
- Ollie Wright, Portland Hearts of Pine, USL League One soccer player

== Writing and journalism ==
- Nick Carbó, writer, poet, essayist, and editor
- Rafael C. Castillo, editor of ViAztlan: an international journal of Arts and Letters
- Debra Dickerson, author, editor, writer, and contributing writer and blogger for Mother Jones magazine
- John Quiñones, B.A. 1974, ABC News correspondent and co-anchor of ABC News' Primetime
