= Moursund (surname) =

Moursund is a surname. Notable people with the surname include:

- Albert W. Moursund III (1919–2002), American lawyer and politician
- Albert Wadel Hansen Moursund (1845–1927), American judge and politician
- Anton N. Moursund (1877–1965), American judge and politician
- David Moursund (1936–2021), American mathematician, computer scientist, and educator
- James Moursund (b. 1994), American Catholic Seminarian and Classical Musician
- Kristian Moursund (1853–1892), Norwegian lawyer and politician
- Travis Bruce Moursund (1901–1959), American politician
