= Anton N. Moursund =

American politician

Anton Norwald Moursund (March 26, 1877 – July 21, 1965) served as a member of the Texas Legislature, was Associate Justice in the Texas Fourth Court of Civil Appeals, and the first Dean of St. Mary's University School of Law in San Antonio, Texas. His family included a number of prominent individuals. Among them were his brother, Walter Henrik Moursund (1884 – 1959), who was the Dean of Baylor College of Medicine and oversaw the school's move from Dallas to Houston. His nephew, Albert W. Moursund III (1919-2002), better known as “A.W.,” was an attorney and a county judge, served two terms in the Texas Legislature, and was a member of President Lyndon B. Johnson’s inner circle.

== Early life ==
Anton Norwald Moursund, born March 26, 1877, was the second of eight children born to Albert Wadel Hansen Moursund (1845 – 1927) and Henrikke Marion Mowinckle (1854 – 1942). A. W. H. Moursund (a.k.a. A. W. Moursund Sr.) immigrated from Norway to the U.S. in 1869. He located in Texas on the advice of his family physician, who believed the moderate climate would benefit his poor health. In 1874, he acquired his license to practice law, built a home in Blanco, Texas (36 miles west of Austin), and married.

In 1883 the Moursund family, which by then included Anton and three other sons, relocated to nearby Fredericksburg, Texas, where the elder Moursund set up a law practice in partnership with pioneer lawyer and judge A. O. Cooley. During the course of his career, in addition to practicing law, A. W. Moursund Sr. served as county judge, Texas legislator, district attorney, and district judge.

== Family life ==
About 1900, Anton Moursund married Elizabeth Patton (1878 – 1965), daughter of Albert L. Patton and Emma Wahrmund Patton of Fredericksburg. During the course of their marriage, the couple had four sons. Travis Bruce Moursund (1901 – 1959) and Henry Walter Moursund (1902 – 1964) joined their father in his law practice. Roy Lee Moursund (1906 – 1909) died of polio, and Myles Patton Moursund (1911 – 1982) took up residence in Houston.

== Career ==
In the early 1900s, Anton N. Moursund joined his father's law firm as partner, practicing in Fredericksburg and Mason, Texas. He was elected to the 27th Texas Legislature in 1901 as representative for Legislative District No. 98 (Blanco, Comal, Gillespie, and Hays Counties). He continued to practice law with his father until his appointment on February 1, 1912, to the bench of the Texas Fourth Court of Civil Appeals. In 1916, he was re-elected to that post for a six-year term, but resigned November 22, 1920, and set up a law practice in San Antonio. He was a member of the Texas State Board of Legal Examiners for 25 years, and its chairman for 12 years. In 1927, he was named the first Dean of San Antonio's St. Mary's University School of Law, a position he held until his retirement in 1938, when he was named Dean Emeritus.

== Death ==
Anton Norwald Moursund died July 21, 1965, in San Antonio.
