= List of Kappa Delta Chi chapters =

Kappa Delta Chi is an intercollegiate Latina service sorority founded at Texas Tech University in 1987. The sorority has collegiate, graduate, and alumni chapters. It also has colonies which it calls prospective chapters.

== Collegiate chapters ==
In the following list of collegiate chapters, active chapters are indicated in bold and inactive chapters are in italics.

Chapter	Charter date and range	Institution	Location	Status	Ref.
**Alpha**	April 6, 1987	Texas Tech University	Lubbock, Texas	Active	
**Beta**	1991– 20xx ?	Texas A&M University	College Station, Texas	Colony	
**Gamma**	1991	University of Texas at El Paso	El Paso, Texas	Active	
**Delta**	November 9, 1991	University of Arizona	Tucson, Arizona	Active	
**Epsilon**	September 6, 1992	University of Texas at Arlington	Arlington, Texas	Active	
Zeta	November 15, 1992 – 20xx ?	Sam Houston State University	Huntsville, Texas	Inactive	
Eta	1993 – xxxx ?	West Texas A&M University	Canyon, Texas	Inactive	
**Theta**	December 15, 1993	University of Houston	Houston, Texas	Active	
Iota	April 16, 1994 – xxxx ?	New Mexico State University	Las Cruces, New Mexico	Active	
**Kappa**	1994	Northern Arizona University	Flagstaff, Arizona	Active	
**Lambda**	December 4, 1994	Arizona State University	Tempe, Arizona	Active	
Mu	1995 – 20xx ?	Eastern New Mexico University	Portales, New Mexico	Inactive	
**Nu**	1995 – 20xx ?	Tarleton State University	Stephenville, Texas	Colony	
Xi	1998 ? – 20xx ?	Prairie View A&M University	Prairie View, Texas	Inactive	
**Omicron**	October 4, 1998	Texas State University	San Marcos, Texas	Active	
**Pi**	1998	University of Texas at Austin	Austin, Texas	Active	
**Rho**	March 27, 1999	Washington State University	Pullman, Washington	Active	
**Sigma**	February 7, 1999	University of Oklahoma	Norman, Oklahoma	Active	
Tau	December 1999 – 20xx ?	University of Wisconsin–Milwaukee	Milwaukee, Wisconsin	Inactive	
**Upsilon**	December 2, 2001	Southern Methodist University	Dallas, Texas	Active	
**Phi**	2000	Stephen F. Austin State University	Nacogdoches, Texas	Active	
**Chi**	May 7, 2000	University of Texas at San Antonio	San Antonio, Texas	Active	
**Psi**	May 7, 2000	Saint Mary's University	San Antonio, Texas	Active	
Omega				Memorial	
**Alpha Alpha**	September 24, 2000 – 20xx ?; December 5, 2015	Wichita State University	Wichita, Kansas	Active	
**Alpha Beta**	2002 – 20xx ?	University of Texas Rio Grande Valley	Edinburg, Texas	Active	
**Alpha Gamma**	March 30, 2003	California State University, Dominguez Hills	Carson, California	Active	
**Alpha Delta**	December 20, 2003	Texas A&M University–Kingsville	Kingsville, Texas	Active	
**Alpha Epsilon**	April 1, 2004	Baylor University	Waco, Texas	Active	(Note: This chapter originated as the BLISS Club, established in 2002.)
**Alpha Zeta**	2004	University of Nevada, Las Vegas	Paradise, Nevada	Active	
**Alpha Eta**	December 19, 2004	University of Nevada, Reno	Reno, Nevada	Active	
**Alpha Theta**	2004 – 20xx ?	University of Houston–Downtown	Houston, Texas	Active	
Alpha Iota	2005–20xx ?	Texas A&M International University	Laredo, Texas	Inactive	
**Alpha Kappa**	November 12, 2005	University of Wisconsin–Madison	Madison, Wisconsin	Active	
**Alpha Lambda**	December 4, 2005	Eastern Washington University	Cheney, Washington	Active	
Alpha Mu	2005 – 20xx ?	Texas Southern University	Houston, Texas	Inactive	
**Alpha Nu**	2006	Midwestern State University	Wichita Falls, Texas	Active	
**Alpha Xi**	November 17, 2006	East Texas A&M University	Commerce, Texas	Active	(Note: Texas A&M University at Commerce changed its name to East Texas A&M University on 7 November 2024.)
**Alpha Omicron**	May 27, 2007	University of New Mexico	Albuquerque, New Mexico	Active	
**Alpha Pi**	September 30, 2007	University of Washington	Seattle, Washington	Active	
Alpha Rho	April 27, 2008 – 20xx ?	Lamar University	Beaumont, Texas	Inactive	
**Alpha Sigma**	2009	Florida State University	Tallahassee, Florida	Active	
**Alpha Tau**	2010	Southwestern University	Georgetown, Texas	Active	
**Alpha Upsilon**	October 23, 2010	University of North Texas	Denton, Texas	Active	
**Alpha Phi**	March 19, 2011	California State University, Monterey Bay	Monterey County, California	Active	
**Alpha Chi**	April 9, 2011	University of Utah	Salt Lake City, Utah	Active	
**Alpha Psi**	March 3, 2012	Oregon State University	Corvallis, Oregon	Active	
**Alpha Omega**	June 22, 2012	Southern Illinois University Carbondale	Carbondale, Illinois	Active	
Beta Alpha	2011 – 20xx ?	University of Illinois Urbana-Champaign	Champaign and Urbana, Illinois	Inactive	
**Beta Beta**	2013	Clarkson University	Potsdam, New York	Active	
**Beta Gamma**	March 30, 2012	Our Lady of the Lake University	San Antonio, Texas	Active	
**Beta Delta**	2012	Western Oregon University	Monmouth, Oregon	Active	
**Beta Epsilon**	April 12, 2013	Michigan State University	East Lansing, Michigan	Active	
**Beta Zeta**	2013	University of Texas at Dallas	Richardson, Texas	Active	
**Beta Eta**	June 20, 2014	Colorado State University	Fort Collins, Colorado	Active	
Beta Theta	2013 – 20xx ?	Northeastern Illinois University	Chicago, Illinois	Inactive	
**Beta Iota**	July 10, 2015	Oklahoma State University–Stillwater	Stillwater, Oklahoma	Active	
**Beta Kappa**	2014 ? – 20xx ?	University of Central Oklahoma	Edmond, Oklahoma	Active	
**Beta Lambda**	June 10, 2016	University of California, Merced	Merced, California	Active	
**Beta Mu**	March 20, 2015	Portland State University	Portland, Oregon	Active	
**Beta Nu**	2016	Emporia State University	Emporia, Kansas	Active	
**Beta Xi**	2017	University of South Carolina	Columbia, South Carolina	Active	
**Beta Omicron**	November 28, 2015	Northwestern University	Evanston, Illinois	Active	
**Beta Pi**	2015	University of North Texas at Dallas	Dallas, Texas	Active	
Beta Rho	2017 – 20xx ?	California State University, Los Angeles	Los Angeles, California	Inactive	
**Beta Sigma**	2017	Heritage University	Toppenish, Washington	Active	
**Beta Tau**	July 14, 2017	California State University, San Bernardino	San Bernardino, California	Active	
**Beta Upsilon**	October 15, 2016	Northern Illinois University	DeKalb, Illinois	Active	
Beta Phi	November 25, 2016 – 2022	Auburn University	Auburn, Alabama	Inactive	
**Beta Chi**	2017	University of Idaho	Moscow, Idaho	Active	
**Beta Psi**	2017	University of West Florida	Pensacola, Florida	Active	
**Beta Omega**	2017	University of Southern California	Los Angeles, California	Active	
**Gamma Alpha**	2017	Texas A&M University–Corpus Christi	Corpus Christi, Texas	Active	
**Gamma Beta**	December 8, 2017	California State University, Sacramento	Sacramento, California	Active	
**Gamma Gamma**	December 8, 2017	Western Michigan University	Kalamazoo, Michigan	Active	
**Gamma Delta**	April 21, 2018	Kansas State University	Manhattan, Kansas	Active	
**Gamma Epsilon**	April 21, 2018	University of Northern Colorado	Greeley, Colorado	Active	
**Gamma Zeta**	December 1, 2018	University of Nebraska–Lincoln	Lincoln, Nebraska	Active	
**Gamma Eta**	December 8, 2018	University of Kansas	Lawrence, Kansas	Active	
**Gamma Theta**	2023	Texas Christian University	Fort Worth, Texas	Active	
		University of Colorado Boulder	Boulder, Colorado	Colony	(Note: Colony was established on December 3, 2023.)

== Graduate chapters ==
In the following list of graduate chapters, active chapters are indicated in bold and inactive chapters are in italics.

Chapter	Charter date and range	Location	Status	Ref.
**Delta Alpha Graduate Chapter**	August 1, 2011	Lubbock, Texas	Active	

== Alumnae chapters ==
KDChi has a National Alumnae Association with alumnae chapters and regions coast to coast. In the following list of chapters, active chapters are indicated in bold and inactive chapters are in italics.

Chapter	Charter date and range	Location	Status	Ref.
**Alamo Alumnae Chapter**		San Antonio, Texas	Active	
**Albuquerque Alumnae Chapter**		Albuquerque, New Mexico	Active	
Arlington Alumnae Chapter		Arlington, Texas	Inactive	
**Austin Alumnae Chapter**		Austin, Texas	Active	
Big Apple Alumnae Chapter		New York City, New York	Inactive	
**Bryan Alumnae Chapter**		Bryan, Texas	Active	
**Central Florida Alumnae Chapter**		Orlando, Florida	Active	
**Chicago Alumnae Chapter**		Chicago, Illinois	Active	
Coastal Bend Alumnae Chapter		Kingsville, Texas	Inactive	
**Dallas Alumnae Chapter**		Dallas, Texas	Active	
**DC Metro Alumnae Chapter**	2005	Washington, D.C.	Active	
**Eastern Nebraska Alumnae Chapter**		Lincoln, Nebraska	Active	
**Fort Worth Alumnae Chapter**		Fort Worth, Texas	Active	
**Houston Alumnae Chapter**	2010	Houston, Texas	Active	
Laredo Alumnae Chapter		Laredo, Texas	Inactive	
Lubbock Alumnae Chapter		Lubbock, Texas	Inactive	
Northern Florida Alumnae Chapter	July 15, 2013 – 202x ?	Tallahassee, Florida	Inactive	
Madison Alumnae Chapter		Madison, Wisconsin	Inactive	
New England Alumnae Chapter		Boston, Massachusetts	Inactive	
**NYC Alumnae Chapter**		New York City, New York	Active	
**Oklahoma City Alumnae Chapter**	July 2016	Oklahoma City, Oklahoma	Active	
Phoenix Metro Alumnae Chapter		Phoenix, Arizona	Inactive	
**Reno Alumnae Chapter**		Reno, Nevada	Active	
Rio Grande Valley Alumnae Chapter		McAllen, Texas	Inactive	
Salem Alumna Chapter		Salem, Oregon	Inactive	
Seattle Alumnae Chapter		Seattle, Washington	Inactive	
**Southern Arizona Alumnae Chapter**		Tucson, Arizona	Active	
**Southern California Alumnae Chapter**		Los Angeles, California	Active	
Southern Nevada Alumnae Chapter		Las Vegas, Nevada	Inactive	
**Sun City Alumnae Chapter**		El Paso, Texas	Active	
Tri-Cities Alumnae Chapter		Tri-Cities, Washington	Inactive	
**Wichita Alumnae Chapter**		Wichita, Kansas	Active	
Wisconsin Alumnae Chapter		Milwaukee, Wisconsin	Inactive	
