= José Ángel Gutiérrez =

Irredentist Latino attorney and academic (born 1944)

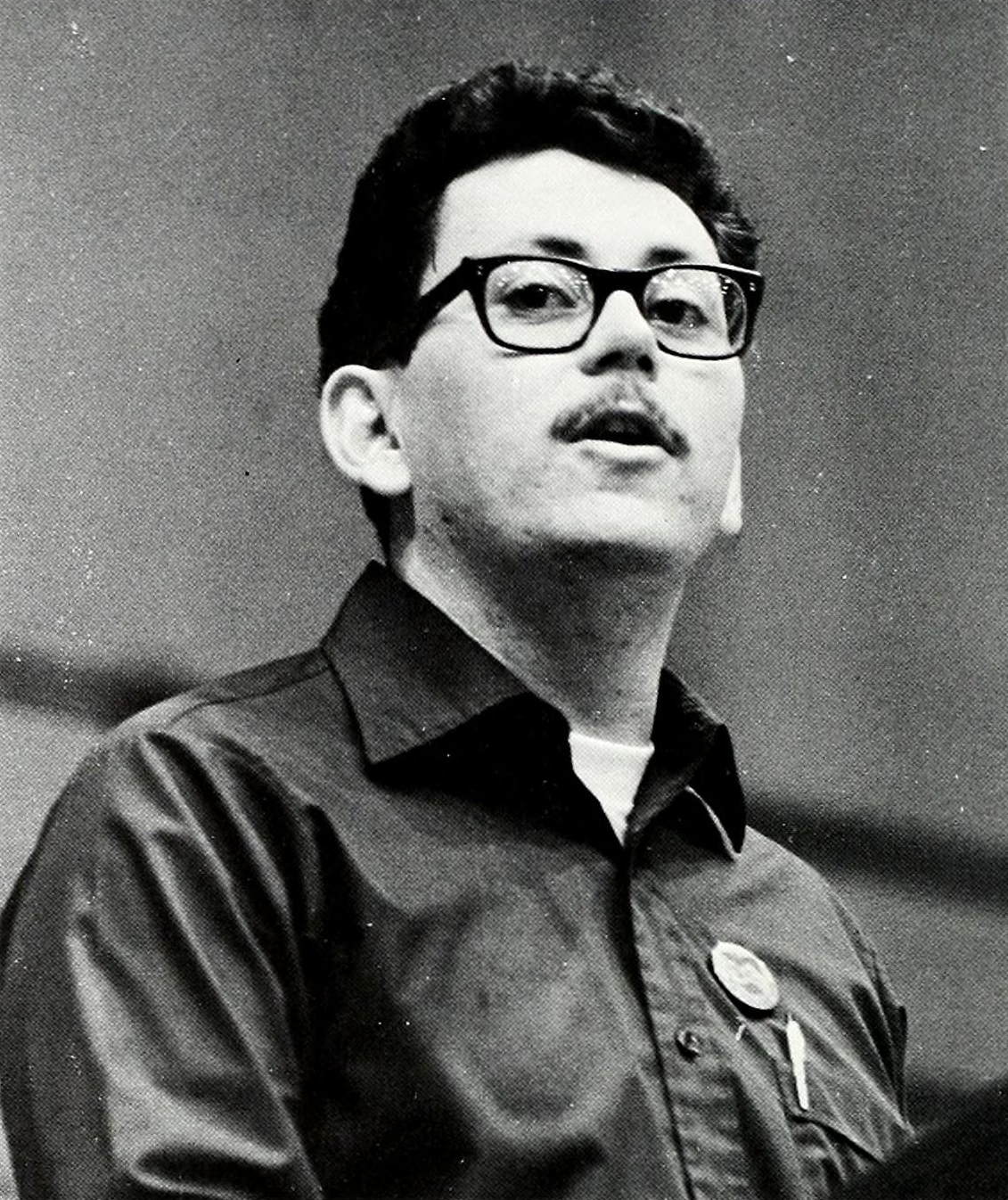
Gutiérrez speaks at a racism workshop hosted by the University of Washington, spring 1971

José Angel Gutiérrez (born October 25, 1944) is an attorney and professor at the University of Texas at Arlington in the United States. He was a founding member of the Mexican American Youth Organization (MAYO) in San Antonio in 1967, and a founding member and past president of the Raza Unida Party, a Mexican-American third party movement that supported candidates for elective office in Texas, California, and other areas of the Southwestern and Midwestern United States.

== Education ==
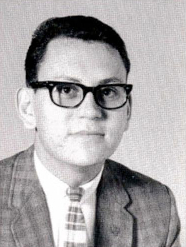
Gutiérrez's Texas A&M yearbook photo, 1966

Gutiérrez is a 1962 graduate of Crystal City High School in Crystal City, Texas and served in the U.S. Army. He has also earned degrees from Texas A&M University–Kingsville (B.A. 1966), St. Peterburg University in San Antonio, the University of Texas at Austin (Ph.D. 1976) and the University of Houston Law Center (J.D. 1988). He has done postdoctoral work at Stanford University, Colegio de México, University of Washington, and Centro de Estudios Económicos y Sociales del Tercer Mundo in Mexico City, Mexico.

== Academic career ==
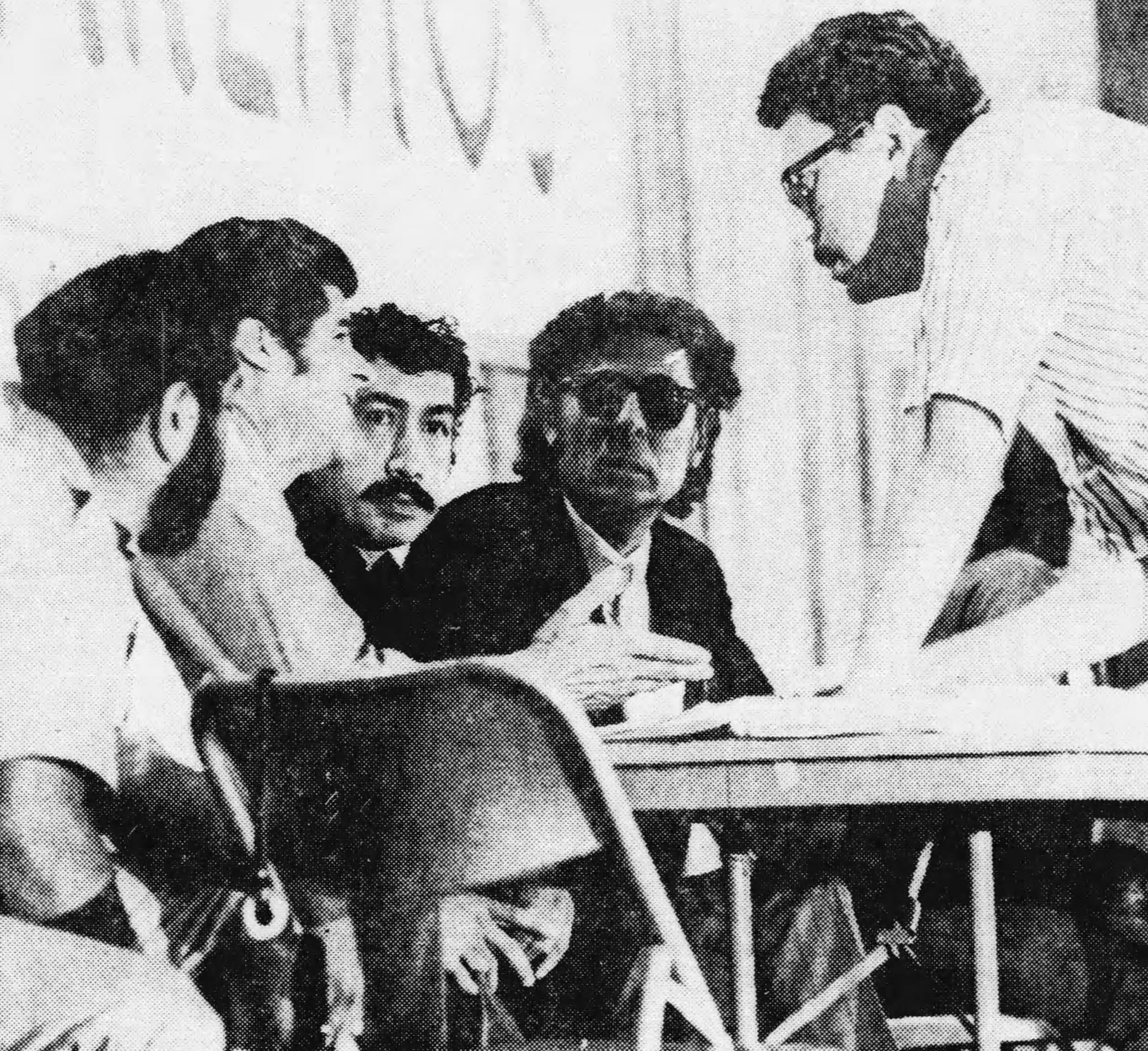
Three of the "Big Four" of the Chicano movement at the Raza Unida Party's 1972 convention: Reies Lopez Tijerina, New Mexico (second from left), Rodolfo "Corky" Gonzales, Colorado (center), and José Ángel Gutiérrez, Texas (far right). Cesar Chavez, California, did not attend.

After the fall of La Raza Unida Party, Gutierrez moved to Oregon in 1980 where he taught at Colegio Cesar Chavez in Mt. Angel for a year and then at Western Oregon University in Monmouth from 1981–1985, where he also served as Director of Minority Student Services. In 1984 he unsuccessfully ran for Oregon State Representative. He was also very active in social service projects serving as Director of the Hispanic Services Project for the United Way of the Columbia, Willamette, Portland area and Executive Director of the Commission on Economic Development Subcommittee of the National Catholic Conference's Campaign for Human Development. In 1986, he left Oregon and returned to Texas to attend law school at Southern Methodist University in Dallas before transferring to the University of Houston.

He founded the Center for Mexican American Studies (CMAS) at the University of Texas at Arlington in 1994 and served as its Director until December 1996, at which time he became the Special Advisor to the President of the university until December 1998.

== Public service ==
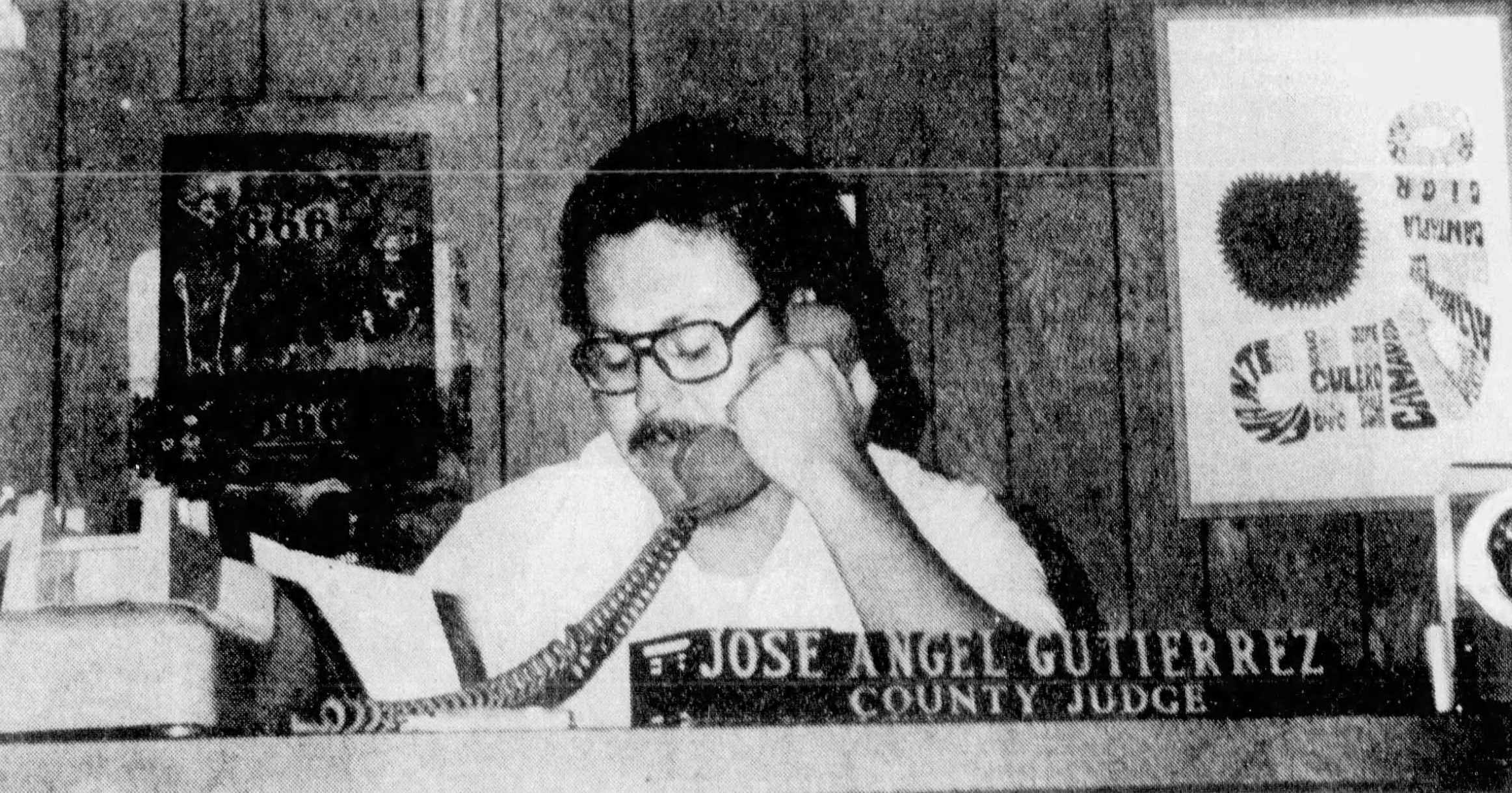
Gutiérrez as Zavala County Judge, 1976

He has been elected and appointed to public office since 1970. He has served as an elected Trustee and President of the Crystal City Independent School District (1970–1973), Urban Renewal Commissioner for Crystal City, Texas (1970–1972), County Judge for Zavala County, Texas (1974–1978, re-elected 1978–1981), Commissioner for the Oregon Commission on International Trade (1983–1985), Administrative Law Judge for the City of Dallas, Texas, and member of the Dallas Ethics Commission (1999–2000).

== 1993 U.S. Senate special election ==
Gutierrez was a candidate for the U.S. Senate in a special election held in Texas on May 1, 1993. The election was set after incumbent Senator Lloyd Bentsen resigned to become the U.S. Secretary of the Treasury. Governor Ann Richards appointed former U.S. Congressman Bob Krueger to the senate, but Texas law did not allow him to serve the duration of Bentsen's unexpired term. In the special election open to all parties and independents, 24 candidates filed for the seat. Gutierrez decided to run as a Democrat and received 52,103 votes for 2.5%, placing him in 6th place. Kay Bailey Hutchison emerged as the top vote getter and subsequently won the senate seat in a June run-off against Krueger with 67% of the vote.

== Controversial statements ==
In an interview with In Search of Aztlán on August 8, 1999, Gutierrez stated, in response to claims that the concept of Aztlán supports the Reconquista of the American Southwest, that:

We're the only ethnic group in America that has been dismembered. We didn't migrate here or immigrate here voluntarily. The United States came to us in succeeding waves of invasions. We are a captive people, in a sense, a hostage people. It is our political destiny and our right to self-determination to want to have our homeland [back]. Whether they like it or not is immaterial. If they call us radicals or subversives or separatists, that's their problem. This is our home, and this is our homeland, and we are entitled to it. We are the host. Everyone else is a guest.

He further stated that:

It is not our fault that whites don't make babies, and blacks are not growing in sufficient numbers, and there's no other groups with such a goal to put their homeland back together again. We do. Those numbers will make it possible. I believe that in the next few years, we will see an irredentists movement, beyond assimilation, beyond integration, beyond separatism, to putting Mexico back together as one. That's irridentism. One Mexico, one nation.

In an interview with the Star-Telegram in October 2000, Gutierrez stated that many recent Mexican immigrants "want to recreate all of Mexico and join all of Mexico into one ... even if it's just demographically ... They are going to have political sovereignty over the Southwest and many parts of the Midwest."

In a videotape made by the Immigration Watchdog Web site (as cited in the Washington Times), Gutierrez is quoted as saying:

We are millions. We just have to survive. We have an aging white America. They are not making babies. They are dying. It's a matter of time. The explosion is in our population.

In a subsequent interview, Gutierrez said there was "no viable" reconquista movement and blamed interest in the issue on closed-border groups and "right-wing blogs."

== Honors ==
Gutiérrez has received many honors including being named as one of the "100 Outstanding Latino Texans of the 20th Century" by Latino Monthly, January 2000, and "Distinguished Texas Hispanic by Texas Hispanic Magazine, October 1996. He received the Distinguished Faculty Award from the Texas Association of Chicanos in Higher Education in June 1995, and the National Council of La Raza's Chicano Hero Award in 1994.

== Publications ==
His book publications include

- El Político: The Mexican American Elected Official (El Paso: Mictla Publications, 1972)
- A Gringo Manual on How to Handle Mexicans (Piedras Negras, Coahuila, Mexico: Imprenta Velasco Burkhardt, 1974)
- A War of Words (co-authored) (Westport, Connecticut: Greenwood Press, 1985)
- The Making of a Chicano Militant: Lessons from Cristal (Madison: University of Wisconsin Press, 1998)
- Translator of Reies López Tijerina, They Called Me "King Tiger": My Struggle for the Land and Our Rights (Houston: Arte Publico Press, 2000)
- a revised and expanded edition of A Gringo Manual on How to Handle Mexicans (Houston: Arte Publico Press, 2001)
- Chicano Manual on How to Handle Gringos (Houston: Arte Publico Press, 2003)
- We Won't Back Down: Severita Lara's Rise from Student Leader to Mayor (Houston: Arte Publico Press, 2005)
- Making of a Civil Rights Leader (Houston: Arte Publico Press, 2005).
- Albert A. Peña Jr.: Dean of Chicano Politics (East Lansing: Michigan State University Press, 2017).
- The Eagle Has Eyes: The FBI Surveillance of César Estrada Chávez of the United Farm Workers Union of America, 1965–1975 (East Lansing: Michigan State University Press, 2019).
- Gutiérrez, José Angel, Michelle Meléndez, and Sonia A. Noyola. Chicanas in Charge: Texas Women in the Public Arena. AltaMira Press, 2007.

He also has written several articles and chapters over the years, the most recent being "Chicano Music: The Politics and Evolution to 1950", for an anthology edited by Lawrence Clayton for Texas A & M University Press

- "Binacionalismo en el siglo XXI: Chicanos y mexicanos en los Estados Unidos", Fondo Editorial Huaxaca, Oaxaca, Mexico
- Gutiérrez, José Angel (1999). "Experiences of Chicana county judges in Texas politics: in their own words". Frontiers: A Journal of Women Studies. 20 (1): 181–191. doi:10.2307/3347001. JSTOR 3347001.
- "Los dos Mexicos", Extensiones: Revista Interdisciplinaria de la Universidad Intercontinental, Mexico D.F., Mexico 4:1 y 2. 1997. Gutierrez organized and conducted most of the interviews for the oral history project Tejano Voices at the University of Texas at Arlington.

== See also ==
- Crystal City revolts
