= Moursund =

Moursund may refer to:

- Moursund (surname)
- Moursund, Texas
