= Crystal City revolts =

The Crystal City revolts were Chicano movements in Crystal City, Texas, which challenged the Anglo domination in government and education in the city. There were two "revolts," one in 1963 and another in 1969. The first revolt saw an electoral takeover of the Crystal City council and mayor's office by Mexican American candidates who became known as "Los Cincos." The second revolt took place over discrimination faced by Mexican American students in the city.

== History ==
In 1963, Juan Cornejo led a coalition formed by the Teamsters Union and members of the Political Association of Spanish-Speaking Organizations (PASSO) to take political power away from the Anglo domination of Crystal City, Texas. These activists saw Chrystal City as a way to show the power of Mexican American voters. The coalition helped voters pay the poll tax, and conducted their own voter registration drives to increase voter turnout. The group ran a slate of Hispanic politicians for city council on April 2, 1963. Texas Rangers were called in to "keep order" during the elections, but some Anglos asked them to "harass 'the greasers.'. Police brutality was common against Mexican Americans in Texas during this time period.

When the challenging coalition of Hispanic candidates won all five council seats, they were then able to appoint the mayor and other important offices in the city. This was the first time the city was not under Anglo control and was a "shocking upset." Texas newspapers called the win a "tragedy" or described the win as 'divisive.' Historian David Montejano described the election as a symbol of "the overthrow of Jim Crow."

After winning office, "Los Cincos" implemented a series of infrastructure projects and hired an engineer, George Ozuna Jr., as city manager. They also looked into allegations of discrimination in the city. Anglos called running the Mexican American slate of candidates "discrimination 'in reverse'" and denounced labor organizers as "communists." This election also inspired other places, like San Benito, Texas, to challenge local governments and run Hispanic candidates for office.

Just six months after the five new politicians began to work in Crystal City, it was reported that Anglo and "affluent" Mexican Americans felt the new government would bring "chaos" and ruin the city's credit rating. One city council member was fired from his original job and another had his "wages cut in half by his Anglo employer." Council members and Cornejo reported receiving telephoned and in-person threats, causing the FBI to investigate. Eventually, three of the council members resigned.

The coalition was weakened and faced a challenge from another group, the Citizens Association Serving All Americans (CASAA), in 1965. CASAA was made up of white Americans and more affluent Mexican Americans. This group successfully ousted the original Hispanic council in the 1965 elections. The new council was made up of two Anglos and three Hispanic members. Mexican Americans who joined with CASAA were known as "Tio Tacos" by the opposition.

=== El Paso conferences ===
The Crystal City revolt of 1963 received attention from nonprofits and also by politicians in Washington, D.C.President Lyndon B. Johnson held a 1967 conference on "Mexican American Problems." These events took place in El Paso, Texas. The events had more than 1,000 delegates from different Spanish-speaking organizations. Not all Chicano activists were satisfied with the official event and many groups held "alternative" conferences in El Paso neighborhoods.

=== 1969 revolt ===
The second revolt happened in 1969. Many young people had been radicalized by the 1963 Los Cincos takeover and activists had come back to Crystal City with a "more mature oppositional consciousness." The schools still harbored resentment against Mexican American students. Eventually, a conflict involving fairness in selecting cheerleaders at Crystal City High School caused another major conflict. The school board met with people who were unhappy about the "ethnicity of cheerleaders" and created a compromise that was ultimately not upheld. After the school board denied that they were discriminating against Mexican Americans, over 200 students at the school walked out. The action quickly spread and grew to other schools. "Boycott classes" were held at the city park and other spaces so that students would not get behind on their classwork. José Ángel Gutiérrez, a former member of the Mexican American Youth Organization (MAYO), was an unofficial leader of the student action. Some students were threatened with violence and mediators from the Justice Department came to Crystal City.

By January 1970, the Crystal City school board gave in to almost all of the student demands.
