= National Hispanic Institute =

International nonprofit organization

- Founded: 1979
- Founder: Ernesto Nieto
- Type: Non-profit education organization
- Purpose: Leadership and education
- Location: Maxwell, Texas, United States
- Region served: United States, Mexico, Panama, Puerto Rico, Dominican Republic
- Key people: Ernesto Nieto; Founder and President; Gloria De Leon; Co-founder and Senior Executive Vice President; Nicole Nieto; Senior Vice President; Julio Cotto; Senior Vice President; Chris Nieto; Senior Vice President; Efrain Cordova; Director of Business
- Revenue: $1,829,689 (2014)
- Expenses: $1,676,079 (2014)
- Website: Official website

The National Hispanic Institute (NHI) is an international nonprofit organization dedicated to serving the future leadership needs of the global Hispanic community. Founded in 1979 in the State of Texas with the mission of serving the future leadership needs of the United States via the Hispanic/Latino community, NHI became the largest Latino youth organization in the United States. NHI is now an international organization with over 85,000 alumni worldwide and a well-known consortium of notable colleges and universities.

To carry out its mission, NHI annually conducts independent research focused on leadership and educational development, collaborates with K-12 schools, colleges, and universities, and works with over 3,000 high-achieving youth and their families. According to its website, NHI has distinguished itself from other organizations by not focusing on civil rights, not pointing to existing social problems as the rallying call to civic involvement, or depicting Hispanics and Latinos as a community in urgent need in order to influence giving. NHI instead recognizes the talent of Hispanic and Latino youth, the potential they represent to the future of the Hispanic/Latino community and extended sectors of the American and global society. Based on this philosophy, NHI develops and conducts experiences through which students may become intellectually, culturally, and socially engaged in the life of their communities.

NHI utilizes a combination of community-based revenue generating strategies to fund its work. It relies neither on government nor private charity to support its efforts. NHI is headquartered in Maxwell, Texas (approximately 30 minutes southeast of Austin, Texas) and maintains its Leadership Service Center on the campus of Villanova University in Villanova, Pennsylvania (approximately 20 minutes west of Philadelphia, Pennsylvania), and its partnership with the Center for Hispanic Studies on the campus of Southwestern University in Georgetown, Texas.

== Work ==
=== Leadership and academic programs ===
Since its first program in 1981, the National Hispanic Institute has identified and selected high-ability youth to participate in its leadership and academic development experiences. These selected students are intellectually challenged to alter old, strident views that have historically framed their understanding of Hispanics and Latinos. According to its website, NHI's leadership programs pursue four key outcomes:

- Instead of continuing the popularly held social notions of a people at the bottom of the human scale, students are presented with a new view, one of an energetic, dynamic, and powerful intertwined culture of global dimensions and potential.
- Instead of perceiving their educational development as being driven by the need to champion the cause of downtrodden communities, students develop an appreciation for the roles that intellectually, socially, and culturally play in guiding and advancing the equity, wealth, and skill-building trajectory of the future of their community.
- Instead of viewing themselves as a collection of individuals from different nationalities, countries, and backgrounds, students are taught to embrace the concept of a world-wide culture of Latinos tied together by a commonality of historical events, experiences, and language.
- Instead of being guided by an urgency to avoid causing potential harm to the American and global quality of life, students’ calling to leadership is invigorated by the excitement of supplying new strength, vigor, and promise to the American and global experience.

NHI leadership programs are hosted on the campuses of notable universities that are members of the organization's consortium known as the NHI College Register (NHI CR). The leadership programs have historically been hosted on campuses in Texas, Arizona, Colorado, Illinois, Indiana, New Mexico, New York, Pennsylvania, and Washington State in the continental United States. They have also been hosted in Argentina, Mexico, Panama, Puerto Rico, and Spain.

==== The Great Debate ====
(for students between 9th and 10th grade)

Each Great Debate conference hosts between 150 and 300 students and discusses complex themes that are important to the growth and leadership supply of the Latino community. NHI's goal is for youth to increase their capacity to express thought, respond to intellectual challenges, work in organized endeavors, and compete against their top peers. Beyond learning about important community issues, participants gain a support network of NHI alumni, including education directors, mentors, and coaches. These volunteers are former participants of the Great Debate and other NHI leadership programs like the Lorenzo de Zavala Youth Legislative Session and Collegiate World Series. In addition, the university hosts/partners invest in supplying their campuses and facilities to support leadership development. A Great Debate student may receive other opportunities as well, like participation as a volunteer mentor, opportunities to win invitations to Celebración, future programs, and access to the NHI College Register network.

==== Lorenzo de Zavala Youth Legislative Session (LDZ) ====
(for students between 10th and 11th grade, or between 11th and 12th grade)

This experience is an opportunity for young people to learn how to navigate, manage, and create large organizations by taking charge of their own youth government and proposing future community policies and projects. Since the first project in Austin, Texas, in 1982, students from over 25 states and four Latin American nations have convened at one of six host sites to play this leadership game of vision, influence, and construction of communities of the future. Each host site serves between 150 and 200 students from throughout the United States and parts of Latin America.

Programs are staffed and supervised by fully certified NHI undergraduate senior counselors, graduate volunteers, and adult professionals who do an annual “Week of NHI Service” as Education Directors.

==== Collegiate World Series (CWS) ====
(for students between 11th and 12th grade)

NHI is familiar with the fact that, from one day to the next, high school seniors are expected to make the transition to independent adult life. The CWS prepares students for the emotional ups and downs of adapting to life away from their parents, making large financial investments, managing time effectively, understanding various cultures and lifestyles different from their own, and making critical decisions that eventually chart the course of their life journey.

For five days, the CWS shepherds students into the transition of going into independent mode – adulthood – and the responsibilities that come with it. Inquiry Based Learning (IBL) is the core methodology of this program, which engages students in an investigative and question-driven approach to mapping out the next 12 to 60 months of their lives.

Of NHI's three high school leadership programs, the CWS represents the most serious. It also tests students’ ability to transform challenges into working solutions.

==== Celebración ====
Celebración is the National Hispanic Institute's showcase event that annually invites its high school age and undergraduate students to participate in a four-day experience that introduces them to community social entrepreneurship as part of their continued involvement in leadership training.

Nearly 450 high school students and 100 undergraduate students attend this event, not to mention an additional 100 alumni who also convene to discuss ways of furthering the work and mission of the organization. Other features of Celebración include a private college fair, an alumni awards banquet, student entertainment, awards recognition, and opportunities for all participants to broaden their social networks and contacts among individuals who actively work to help change the lives of others.

==== John F. Lopez Fellowship (JFL) ====
(for college students)

The JFL Fellowship gives high-achieving college students the opportunity to develop their ability to mobilize communities and operate at executive levels and provides these students with a means to share their developing knowledge and expertise with others. As counselors, research specialists, trainers, and planners, fellows gain direct interactive experiences that enable them to critically examine the needs and capacities required for future leadership. Named in honor of NHI alumnus and board member, John F. Lopez, Jr., the JFL Fellowship is designed to elicit qualities of spirit, creativity, and talent.

==== Digital Leadership Experiences ====
Due to the 2020 coronavirus pandemic, NHI decided to launch digital versions of its Great Debate and CWS programs, branding the new online programs as the Digital Learning Experiences and the individual programs as GDx and CWSx respectively. The Digital Learning Experiences also included a symposium series for all students enrolled in 2020 summer programs, geared specifically for LDZ students. During the summer of 2020, students participated in three different GDx programs and two different CWSx programs.

=== Leadership and education research ===
NHI annually conducts independent research focused on leadership and educational development via its Collaborative Research Center (CRC), its Leadership Service Center (LSC) at Villanova University, and its newly formed partnership with the Center for Hispanic Studies at Southwestern University.

==== Collaborative Research Center ====
The Collaborative Research Center (CRC) allows NHI to carry out research in collaboration with diverse community partners. The research across several youth populations includes the study of Latinos from upwardly mobile families, urban settings, rural communities, and immigrant backgrounds. This research allows NHI to remain current regarding the thinking and trends of these different population groups from the perspective of their educational aspirations, career interests, income levels, parent backgrounds and perceptions, youth attitudes towards the Latino community, levels of community involvement, and a host of other activity areas that include political participation, generational dynamics, purchasing trends, etc.

CRC research is used primarily for internal use and study, however, more recently NHI research has been requested for various uses. NHI's CRC studies are currently aimed at assisting institutions of higher learning in their outreach and recruitment efforts, as well as improving their undergraduate retention rates. Additionally, the CRC is compiling and analyzing data regarding both the U.S. and global Latino communities' long-term capacities to maintain organizational effectiveness in an era of extreme population growth.

==== Partnership with Center for Hispanic Studies at Southwestern University ====
In February 2008, Southwestern University and NHI announced they would jointly launch a partnership with the Center for Hispanic Studies on the campus of Southwestern University. The partnership's intent is to research and evaluate college-readiness programs for Hispanic youth. Specifically, the center's intent is to open doors to conducting much-needed research on the impact of community intervention strategies via leadership and education, such as those offered by NHI. The partnership is expected to augment the capacity of NHI's ongoing research via its CRC.

=== College Register ===
NHI's College Register was founded and launched in 1989, as a consortium of select and notable post-secondary, four-year institutions that work closely with NHI to develop a new reservoir of Hispanic and Latino leaders that will make an impact on the global Latino community.

The College Register is committed to increasing the numbers of Latino students at notable 4-year institutions and to the advancement and development of the Hispanic/Latino college campus community. Since its inception, the College Register and NHI have developed programs that have created new market techniques for conducting outreach to Latino families, name-branded member institutions among the college bound Hispanic/Latino youth community, and cultivated strong and effective leadership among Hispanic/Latino campus leaders.

==== Member institutions ====
According to the NHI College Register directory, the following institutions are active members of NHI's consortium of notable colleges and universities:

- Adelphi University
- American University
- Arcadia University
- Arkansas State University Campus Querétaro
- Augustana College
- Austin College
- Baylor University
- Benedictine College
- Cabrini University
- Case Western Reserve University
- Claremont McKenna College
- Colby College
- Colorado State University
- Colorado State University–Pueblo
- Concordia University Texas
- Cornell University
- DePaul University
- Elizabethtown College
- Elmhurst University
- Emory & Henry College
- Emory University
- Florida International University
- George Washington University
- Indiana University Bloomington
- Iowa State University
- Macalester College
- Midwestern State University
- New York University
- Northwestern University
- Organization of Latino Actuaries
- Purdue University
- Rhodes College
- Schreiner University
- Southwestern University
- St. Edward’s University
- St. John's College
- St. Mary’s College of California
- St. Mary’s College of Maryland
- St. Mary’s University, Texas
- Stanford University
- Swarthmore College
- Texas A&M University – San Antonio
- Texas State University
- Texas Tech University
- The University of Iowa
- The University of Texas at Arlington
- The University of Texas at Austin
- Trinity College
- Trinity University
- University of Dayton
- University of Denver
- University of Findlay
- University of North Texas
- University of Northern Colorado
- University of Notre Dame
- University of Pittsburgh
- University of San Diego
- University of South Alabama
- University of South Florida
- University of the Incarnate Word
- Vanderbilt University
- Washington University in St. Louis
- Wheaton College
- Willamette University

== Achievements ==
- NHI students gain admission to 9 out of 10 schools.
- 98% of NHI students attend a four year university.
- 90% of NHI students graduate in 4 to 5 years.
- over 70% receive financial scholarships

NHI original logo

== History ==
- NHI was founded in 1979 by Ernesto Nieto and Gloria de Leon in Austin, Texas.
- The organization's main office was first located at Concordia University Texas.
- NHI created Young Leaders Conference (YLC) in 1981 at the Lyndon B. Johnson School of Public Affairs.
- NHI created Lorenzo de Zavala Youth Legislative Session (LDZ) in 1983 at Concordia University Texas.
- NHI's headquarters and administrative offices were moved to Maxwell, Texas, outside of Austin, in 1985.

- Nieto published his book Third Reality: Crafting a 21st Century Hispanic/Latino Agenda, in 2001.

- NHI celebrated its 25th anniversary in July 2001.
- NHI opened its Leadership Service Center and East Coast Outreach Office at Villanova University in October 2004.
- NHI announced its Center for Hispanic Studies at Southwestern University in February 2008.
- Alexandria Ocasio-Cortez held the position of Educational Director at NHI, according to her 2018 financial disclosures.

== Founders ==
Ernesto Nieto and Gloria de Leon are the co-founders of the National Hispanic Institute. Nieto has served as president since the organization's inception in 1979. He served in various management positions in both the state and federal governments. In 1979, he decided to leave his work in government to pursue his vision of creating a leadership institute for Hispanic/Latino youth.

Nieto has received the Eagle Leadership Award by the El Paso, Texas City Council, the Meritorious Service Award by Southwestern University, and an honorary Doctor of Humane Letters degree from Texas Wesleyan University in Fort Worth, Texas. He has also been honored as a "Distinguished Alumnus" of both Southwestern University and Jefferson Davis High School. Other awards include Southwestern University's Citation of Merit Award for Community Service and the Human Relations Award from the National Association for College Admissions Counseling.
