= Willie Velasquez =

American activist (1944–1988)

Willie Velasquez Jr.
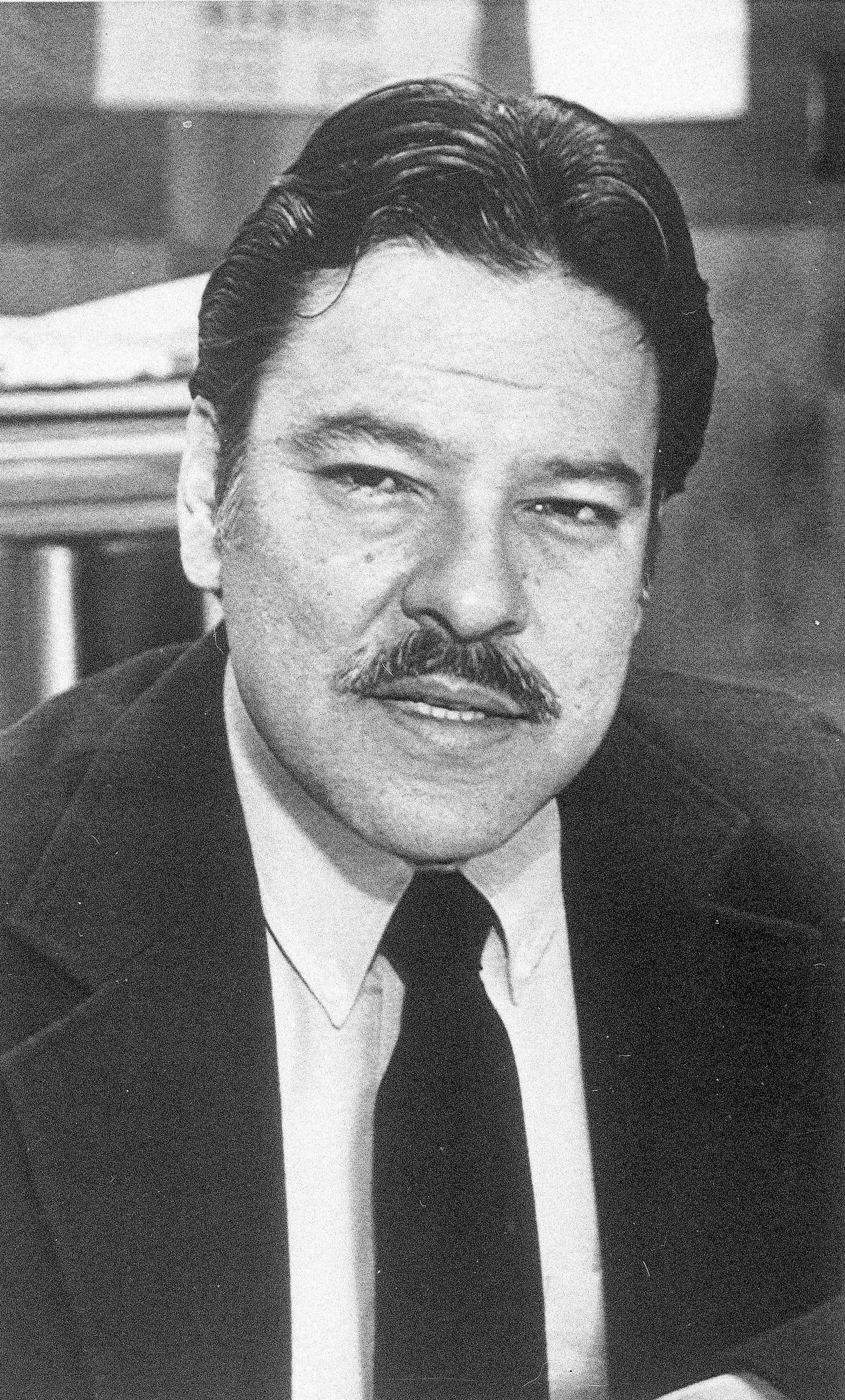
- Velasquez in 1984
- Born: William C. Velasquez Jr. May 9, 1944; Orlando, Florida, U.S.
- Died: June 15, 1988 (aged 44); San Antonio, Texas, U.S.
- Occupation: Social Activist
- Spouse: Janie Sarabia
- Children: 3

William C. Velasquez Jr. (May 9, 1944 – June 15, 1988) was an American social activist and vote organizer. He founded the Southwest Voter Registration Education Project, which worked to expand Latino and Hispanic American interest and participation in the voting process. His group popularized the motto Su Voto Es Su Voz (Your Vote is Your Voice).

== Biography ==
Velasquez was born to William and María Luisa (née Cardenas) Velásquez, who were Mexican Americans. His father was stationed in Florida during World War II where he worked as a union organizer. He attended St. Mary's University where in 1967, he helped form the Mexican American Youth Organization and later earned a B.A. in economics. Velasquez helped form the basis for Raza Unida Party as El Movimiento Social de La Raza Unida.

In 1968, Velasquez was boycott coordinator for United Farm Workers and organized strikes at the Rio Grande Valley. He founded the Mexican American Unity Council and then later on became field director for the Southwest Council of La Raza in 1970.

From 1972 to 1974, Velasquez started work on the Southwest Voter Registration Education Project which would have helped Latinos be given more involvement with the voting process. Velasquez also hoped that the democratic process was more aware of the Latino vote.

Velasquez would not live long enough to see his accomplishments flourish. He died in 1988 due to kidney cancer.

Velasquez was survived by his wife and three children.

In 1995, Velasquez was posthumously honored with the Presidential Medal of Freedom by President Bill Clinton.
