= Severita Lara =

Mexican-American political activist (born 1952)

Severita Lara (born February 6, 1952) is a Mexican-American political activist from Crystal City, Texas. She is known as a leader of the 1969 Crystal City High School student walkout. She ran for county judge in 1986 and was elected into the city council of Crystal City in 1992.

== Early life ==
Lara grew up speaking Spanish and was enrolled in a preschool program in which she had to write, speak, and read in Spanish. She attended Zavala Elementary School in a zero bola program, which was comparable to being in a grade below zero that was created for all Mexicans, regardless of their English proficiency. During her junior high school days, her father continued to object speaking Spanish in school, with the assistance of the principal, and was punished by being sent to the library. However, this helped develop a love for literature. Lara attended Crystal City High School, a school with a predominantly Chicano student body.

== Crystal City High School walkout ==
Despite the school having a majority Chicano population, students were aware of inequality in the school system such as segregation and under representation in the cheerleading squad. Alumni of Crystal City High School and Jose Angel Gutierrez, Mexican American Youth Organization (MAYO), attempted to present a list of demands by the students at a school board meeting; however, the school board did not listen and adjourned the meeting and did not listen. Lara drew up a petition to the school board with the support of students' parents, but the board failed to acknowledge their demands. This resulted in 500 students walking out of school the first day of the walkout and going upwards to 1,700 students ranging from elementary to high school participating in the walkout. In the end, the walkouts proved successful and the school board listened to the students' demands.

== Life after the walkout ==
Lara would later graduate high school and attend St. Mary's University obtaining her bachelor's degree i biology alongside majoring in Chemistry. Afterwards, obtained a scholarship from Becas de Aztlan and attended the medical school from Universidad Autónoma Metropolitana in Mexico City. She settled in Crystal City in 1984 obtaining a job within Crystal City High School teaching biology, chemistry, and physiology later becoming the school librarian.

== Political career ==
Lara ran for county judge in 1986 under the Democratic Party winning the runoff, but losing to the recount without appeal. She declined to run again when her health began to decline. Afterwards, she led a successful campaign to win a position in the city council of Crystal City and appointed mayor the following year. Her first priority was to create a recreation center called Mexico Chico. She would be unsuccessful in her recall election in 1996 declining to run for another term.

== Later life ==
Lara would retire from politics in order to obtain her master's degree. She created grants to fund the arts and recreations for children. As a teacher, Lara continued to teach students in Crystal City about the importance of the Chicano movement.
