= Ernest A. Raba =

Ernest A. Raba (December 1, 1912 in San Antonio, Texas – December 3, 2007 in San Antonio, Texas) was a dean of the St. Mary's University School of Law.

== Early life ==
Raba was born of immigrant parents. His father, Ernst W. Raba, was a well-known photographer and artist in San Antonio, Texas. He attended grammar school at St. Joseph Parochial School, then attended St. Mary’s Academy High School, the predecessor of Central Catholic.

== Early career ==
Raba graduated summa cum laude from St. Mary's University, Texas in 1934. He then received his law degree from St. Mary's University School of Law in 1937, graduating at the top of his class. After involvement in private practice, Raba taught as an Adjunct Law Professor at St. Mary's University School of Law. In 1942, he was inducted into the Army. Soon after, he was accepted into the first Judge Advocate General’s School for service members at the University of Michigan Law School.

Following the JAG program, Raba served in the JAGC 8th Service Command Headquarters in Dallas. He later served as Staff Judge Advocate at Fort Polk, Louisiana.

== Dean of St. Mary's Law ==
Shortly after his time in the service, Raba was appointed Dean of St. Mary's University School of Law in 1946. Raba oversaw the move of the law campus from downtown San Antonio to its current location at the St. Mary's University campus. Raba also helped the Law School achieve accreditation from two national accreditation bodies. In 1978, Raba retired as the longest tenured law school dean in the United States.

== Honors and awards ==
Among many other awards, Raba received the Distinguished Alumni Award (1977); Distinguished Law Graduate Award (1982); the St. Thomas More Award (1988); and the Lifetime Achievement Award (2005). Additionally, the main faculty building on the Law School campus is named after him.
