= Southwest Voter Registration Education Project =

Latino voter participation organization

- Founded: 1974
- Founder: William C. Velasquez
- Location: San Antonio, Texas
- Region served: Voting rights
- Key people: William C. Velasquez Jr., Founder and President from 1974-1984, Andrew Hernandez President from 1984-1994, Antonio Gonzalez, President 1994-2018, Legal Director Rolando l. Rios, Lydia Camarillo Current President
- Website: https://www.svrep.org

The Southwest Voter Registration Education Project (SVREP), founded in 1974, is the oldest and largest non-partisan Latino voter participation organization in the United States. SVREP was founded by William C. Velasquez Jr. SVREP has registered 2.6 million Latino voters, trained 150,000 leaders and encouraged thousands of individuals to volunteer in their communities. Their slogan is “Su Voto es Su Voz.”

== History ==
The mission of SVREP is to, “Empower Latinos and other minorities by increasing their participation in the American democratic process SVREP accomplishes this by strengthening the capacity, experience and skills of Latino leaders, networks, and organizations through programs that consistently train, organize, finance, develop, expand and mobilize Latino leaders and voters around an agenda that reflects their values. Thus, SVREP's motto is: "Su Voto Es Su Voz" (Your Vote is Your Voice).” SVREP founder William “Willie” C. Velasquez imagined a society that would allow Latinos to actively participate and lead in the democratic process.

SVREP has sponsored over 2,000 Voter Registration drives (registering 2.6 million voters) across the west, southwest and southeast states to register, educate, and promote voting in upcoming elections. SVREP also organizes phone banks and canvasses to remind people of upcoming election dates and assists in locating their local voting station. SVREP also sponsors voting rights lawsuits under the federal Voting Rights Act and the California Voting Rights Act. To date SVREP has prevailed in 87 out of 88 federal Voting Rights Act cases and over 70 California Voting Rights actions.

In 2016 SVREP Sued Bexar County in Texas for misinforming constituents about voter ID rules. SVREP argued that the voter ID laws were an attempt to curb and discourage minorities from participating in the electoral process.

Another key initiative that SVREP sponsors is their Latino Academy. Founded in 1997 the Latin Academy trains candidates, campaign workers, and community leaders/organizers on the how to run for elective office including voter targeting, social media, messaging, fundraising, campaign management, voter registration, and get out the vote; once leaders/organizers have completed the training tracks they are eligible to act as project coordinators, treasurers, and chairs for a voter registration project in their community. Once candidates complete the training they are urged to run for office -though nonpartisan SVREP does not endorse candidates. Through the Latino Academy individuals are exposed to grassroots organizing and voter registration and mobilization techniques.

SVREP partners with the William C. Velasquez Institute (WCVI) to run a "policy and governance" version of the Latino Academy which focuses on training elected officials on ethics and public policy options. www.wcvi.org. Founded by SVREP in 1985 as the Southwest Voter Research Institute-SVRI, WCVI was rechristened in 1997 to honor the late Willie Velasquez.

== See also ==
- Congressional Hispanic Caucus
- Latino
- NALEO
- NCLR
- American GI Forum
- LULAC
- MALDEF
