= Gloria DeLeon =

American organizational executive

Gloria De Leon
- Born: December 16, 1952 (age 73); McAllen, Texas
- Education: B.S. in Social Work; University of Texas Pan American Honorary Doctor of Humane Letters Degree; Texas Wesleyan University
- Occupations: Executive Vice President; National Hispanic Institute
- Known for: Work in Leadership, Education & Youth Development
- Predecessor: First Officeholder
- Awards: Human Relations Award; National Association of College Admissions Counselors Distinguished Alumnus Award; University of Texas Pan American
- Website: https://www.nationalhispanicinstitute.org/

Gloria De Leon (born December 16, 1952) has been involved with the National Hispanic Institute since its establishment and has served as the organization's Executive Vice President since 1982.

== Early life ==
Born in McAllen, Texas, De Leon attended McAllen High School and later entered the University of Texas Pan American where she received her Bachelor of Science in Social Work. After her undergraduate coursework, De Leon served in various management positions in both the state and federal government.

== Career ==
In 1983, Gloria De Leon decided to leave government to pursue the vision of creating a leadership institute for Latino youth with Ernesto Nieto, founder and current president of the National Hispanic Institute (NHI). Under the leadership of both De Leon and Nieto, the National Hispanic Institute has worked with over 120 institutions of higher education and 70,000 high-ability youth from across the nation.

== Awards & recognitions ==
Among her numerous recognitions, De Leon has received an Honorary Doctor of Humane Letters Degree from Texas Wesleyan University in Fort Worth, Texas and the Distinguished Alumnus Award from the University of Texas Pan American.

== Appearances in Published Works ==
De Leon has written extensively, via the NHI regarding the future leadership need of the Latino community both in the United States as well as globally. Additionally, she has been featured in the creative non-fiction book Chicanas in Charge: Texas Women in the Public Arena by Jose Angel Gutierrez (Author), Michelle Melendez (Author), Sonia A. Noyola (Author).

Additionally, De Leon plays a heavy role in Third Reality: Crafting a 21st Century Latino Agenda by Ernesto Nieto, her husband, and founder and current president of the National Hispanic Institute.

== Other work ==
De Leon continues her involvement in the community by serving as a consultant regarding leadership, education, & Latino youth development.

Preceded by First Officeholder	Executive Vice President; National Hispanic Institute (NHI); 1982 - Present	Succeeded by
