= Angela Salinas =

United States Marine Corps general

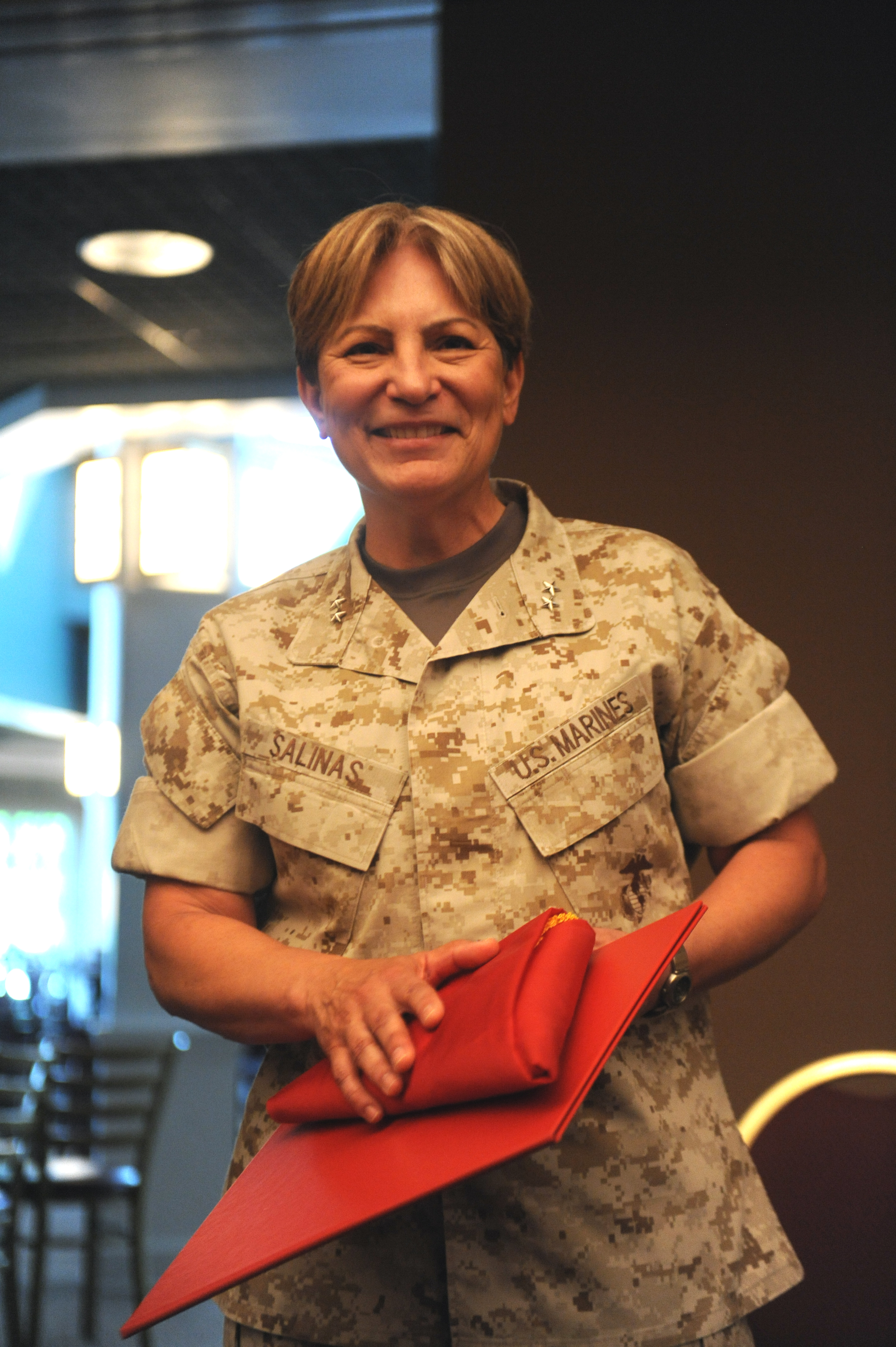
- Salinas at Quantico in May 2010
- Born: December 6, 1953 (age 72); Alice, Texas, U.S.
- Military career
- Allegiance: United States
- Branch: United States Marine Corps
- Service years: 1974–2013
- Rank: Major General
- Nickname: "Angie"
- Commands: Marine Corps Recruit Depot San Diego; 12th Marine Corps District; 4th Recruit Training Battalion; Recruiting Station Charleston
- Awards: Defense Superior Service Medal; Legion of Merit (2)

Angela Salinas (born December 6, 1953) is a retired major general in the United States Marine Corps. She was the first woman to command a Marine Corps Recruit Depot, and the first Hispanic woman to become a general in the Marines.

== Early life and education ==
Salinas was born on December 6, 1953, in Alice, Texas, the youngest of five children to Texan parents. She is a descendant of one of the first civilian settlers in Texas, granted a Porción by Spain in 1767.

== Military career ==
Salinas in 2013 interview

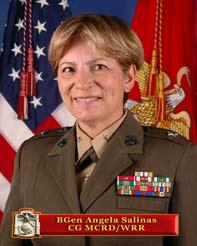
Salinas

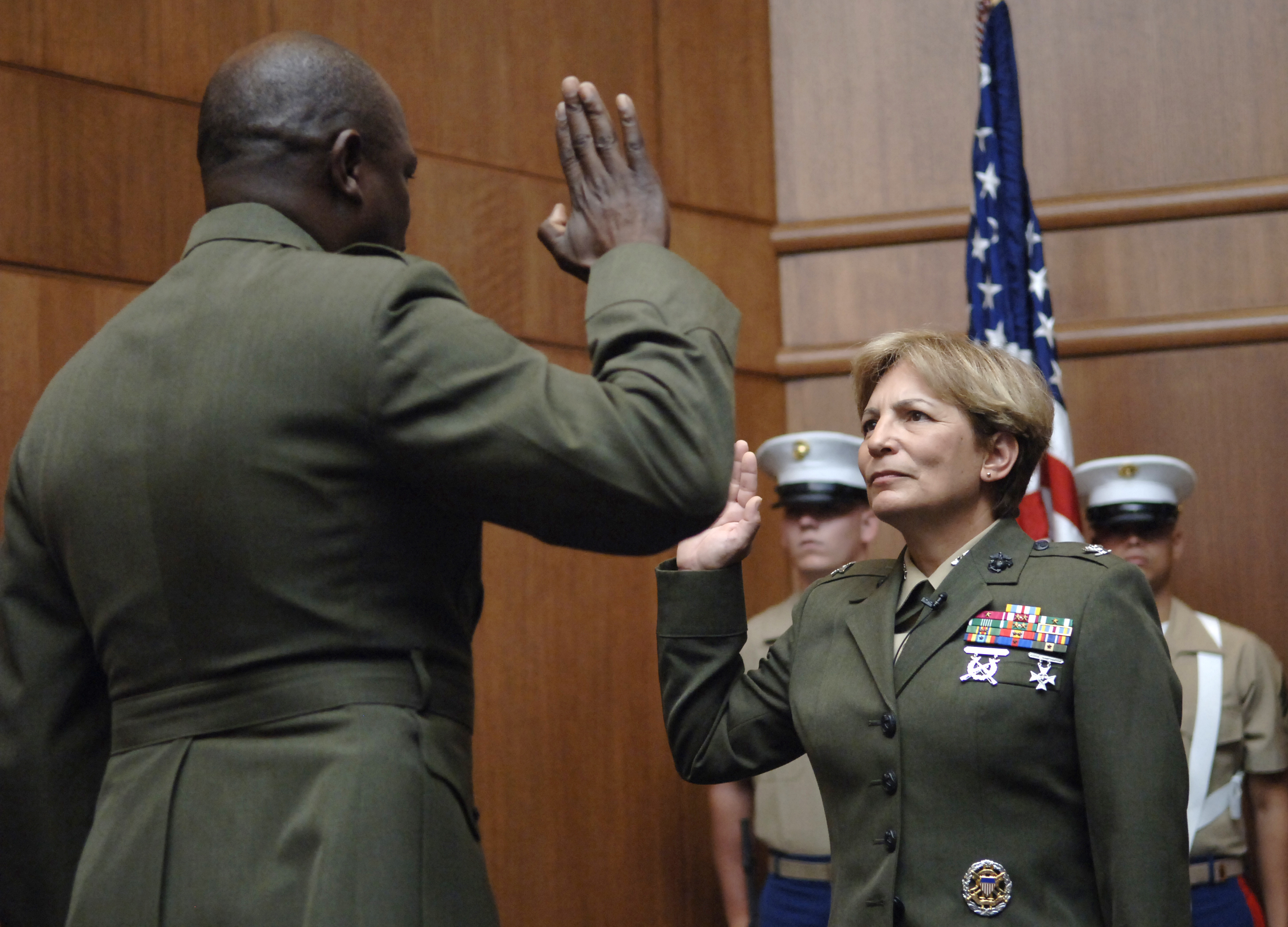
BGen Salinas restates her oath on promotion to the rank of Brigadier General.

Salinas began her military career at Parris Island after enlisting into the United States Marine Corps in May 1974. She was subsequently assigned as a legal services clerk (MOS 4421) at Marine Corps Base Camp Pendleton, the Marine Air Reserve Training Detachment in Alameda, and the inspector-instructor staff for 4th Reconnaissance Battalion in San Antonio.

In 1977, Salinas was selected for the Enlisted Commissioning Program, and commissioned as a second lieutenant after graduation from Dominican College of San Rafael with a Bachelor of Arts in history. She was subsequently assigned to the 2nd Marine Aircraft Wing at Marine Corps Air Station Cherry Point and served as a legal services officer. In 1980, she was assigned to Woman Recruit Training Command at Parris Island, where she served as a series commander, executive officer, and battalion operations officer.

In 1986, Salinas assumed command of Headquarters and Service Company, 1st Maintenance Battalion until 1987, when she became the deputy G-1, 1st Force Service Support Group, both at Camp Pendleton. In 1988, she was transferred to serve as the executive officer for Recruiting Station Charleston, then assumed command the following year. In 1992, she served as a combat service support ground monitor for the Manpower Management and Officer Assignments at Headquarters Marine Corps in Washington, D.C.

In 1993, Salinas became a Deputy, a Special Assistant for General/Flag Officer Matters, Office of the Director, Joint Staff at the Pentagon. In 1996, she assumed command of the 4th Recruit Training Battalion at Parris Island. In 1999, she served as the Assistant Chief of Staff, G-5, for III Marine Expeditionary Force, Okinawa, Japan. In 2001, she assumed command of the 12th Marine Corps District. From 2004 to 2006, Salinas served as Chief of Staff, Marine Corps Recruiting Command at Quantico.

On August 2, 2006, Salinas was promoted to the rank of brigadier general. On August 4, 2006, she assumed command of Marine Corps Recruit Depot San Diego. She transferred to direct the manpower management, Manpower and Reserve Affairs at Marine Corps Base Quantico in August 2009. In March 2010, she was selected for promotion to major general, and promoted on May 12.

Salinas holds a Bachelor of Arts in history from Dominican University of California and a master's degree from the Naval War College. She is a graduate of the Amphibious Warfare School, the Naval War College's Command and Staff College and the Army War College. Salinas accepted the invitation and became an honorary member of Kappa Delta Chi sorority on June 24, 2012, while attending/guest speaking at KDChi's 25th Anniversary Conference in Lubbock, Texas.

In 2013, Salinas retired after 39 years of military service as the highest ranking woman in the USMC, at the time of her retirement. Salinas currently resides in Texas.

On July 1, 2015, Salinas became the CEO of the Girl Scouts of Southwest Texas, overseeing business operations for the organization that includes 15,000 girls and adult leaders in a 21-county area with a $6.4 million budget.

== Awards and decorations ==

	Defense Superior Service Medal			Office of the Joint Chiefs of Staff Identification Badge
Legion of Merit w/ 1 award star	Meritorious Service Medal w/ 2 award stars	Navy and Marine Corps Commendation Medal w/ 1 award star	Army Commendation Medal	Office of the Joint Chiefs of Staff Identification Badge
Navy and Marine Corps Achievement Medal w/ 2 award stars	Joint Meritorious Unit Award	Navy Meritorious Unit Commendation w/ 2 service stars	National Defense Service Medal w/ 2 service stars	Office of the Joint Chiefs of Staff Identification Badge
Global War on Terrorism Service Medal	Navy Sea Service Deployment Ribbon w/ 1 service star	Marine Corps Recruiting Ribbon w/ 1 service star	Marine Corps Drill Instructor Ribbon w/ 1 service star	Office of the Joint Chiefs of Staff Identification Badge

== See also ==
- Hispanics in the United States Marine Corps
