= Rebecca Flores Harrington =

Labor activist

Rebecca Flores Harrington (born 1942 or 1943) is a labor activist from Texas. She was the director of the Texas chapter of the United Farm Workers labor union for several decades, and eventually became vice president of the nationwide organization.

== Early life and education ==
Flores was born in Atascosa County, Texas to a family of migrant workers. Flores' family has lived in Texas since the mid-1700s, and several ancestors were involved in prominent Texas historical events. She is one of five children. In 1957, Flores' family moved from the family farm and settled in San Antonio, where she attended and graduated from Fox Tech High School. After graduation, Flores was hired as a secretary for the Fourth Army Headquarters at Fort Sam Houston. After five years, she

== Career ==
Flores became the Director of the Texas chapter of the United Farm Workers (UFW) Union in 1975. At the time, a faction of the UFW led by Antonio Ordendain split to form the Texas Farm Workers Union. Flores had to direct an organization under pressures of sexism and racism, and had to compete with the TFWU in order to maintain a strong hold with the farm workers of Texas. Under her leadership, UFW expanded its reach through house meetings and adapted to the transient nature of Texas migrant farming by developing a network of colonia committees. Flores advocated for many issues surrounding the health, well-being, and civil rights of farm workers in Texas. Her successful advocacy led to the expansion of worker's compensation for injured and unemployed farm workers; led to a raise in the state's minimum wage; led to the availability of toilets and drinkable water to farm workers; led to the passage of a bill that protected farm worker's rights to know what pesticides they were exposed to.

By 1999, Flores was the vice president of the national UFW.

Flores became the Texas Director of the National AFL-CIO and remained her in position as a farm worker advocate and union employee until her retirement in 2005. Since 2014, she has become active as an advocate to change DHS policies surrounding detention of mothers and their children.

== Personal life ==
At her time with the University of Michigan, Flores began participating in boycotts across Detroit. Flores met her husband, Jim Harrington, when she was living in Detroit and married him in 1973, with the two of them settling in South Texas where he worked with the ACLU efforts on farm workers rights, and she volunteered at boycotts and organizing. They have three children.
