= Kappa Delta Chi =

American collegiate Latina sorority

- ΚΔΧ
- Founded: April 6, 1987; 38 years ago Texas Tech University
- Type: Service
- Affiliation: NALFO
- Status: Active
- Emphasis: Latina
- Scope: National
- Motto: "Leading with Integrity, United through Service"
- Pillars: Unity, Honesty, Integrity, and Leadership
- Colors: Pink and Maroon
- Flower: Pink Rose
- Jewel: Emerald
- Mascot: Penguin
- Publication: The Emerald
- Philanthropy: American Cancer Society
- Chapters: 79 active
- Colonies: 6
- Members: 8,100+ lifetime
- Nickname: KDChi
- Headquarters: P.O. Box 4317; Lubbock, Texas 79409; United States
- Website: www.kappadeltachi.org

Kappa Delta Chi Sorority, Inc. (ΚΔΧ), also known as K-D Chi (pronounced Kay-Dee-Kie), is a Greek letter, intercollegiate Latina service sorority founded at Texas Tech University in 1987. It is a member of the National Association of Latino Fraternal Organizations. It has chartered 85 chapters in the United States.

== Founding ==
Kappa Delta Chi Sorority was established at Texas Tech University in Lubbock, Texas in 1987. It was established by four friends: Cynthia Garza-Fleitman, Nellie Flores-Ledesmal, Irene Montoya, and Melissa Montoya. These founders recognized the need to unify and promote leadership amongst Hispanic women at the university.

The four founders began the steps to become recognized as an organization at the university, securing the help of Marlene Hernandez, the university's associate director of new student relations to be their adviser. The founders enlisted the aid of ten women to help promote the ideals and philosophy of the sorority to other Hispanic women at Texas Tech. These ten women are known as the charter members, including Rocio Briseno, Dahlia Cavazos, Melissa Chavez, Suzanna Cisneros, Mary Garza, Doris Mendiola, Maria Pando, Theresa Reyes, Christella Rivera, and Carline Soto.

Kappa Delta Chi was recognized as an official organization at Texas Tech University on April 6, 1987, now considered the sorority's founding date. It became a national sorority with the induction of the first chapter outside of Texas In 1991, it chartered its first chapter outside of Texas—Delta chapter at the University of Arizona. A chapter was established at the University of Texas at Arlington in 1992.

Kappa Delta Chi Sorority, Inc. was incorporated in the state of Texas as a community service-based, nonprofit corporation on September 25, 1997. The sorority established its National Alumnae Association in 1998. KDChi became a member of the National Association of Latino Fraternal Organizations (NALFO) in 2000.

As of the fall of 2007, the sorority had expanded to include more than thirty chapters in the United States, had initiated more than 2,000 members, and had raised more than $18,000 for scholarships and $15,000 for the American Cancer Society. Over the years, Kappa Delta Chi has grown to include women of various ethnicities and cultures and has inducted other chapters in eight states. As of 2025, it has initiated more than 3,500 members.

== Symbols ==
The official KDChi motto was chosen in 2008 and it is "Leading with Integrity, United through Service." Its principles or pillars are unity, honesty, integrity, and leadership.

The sorority's colors are pink and maroon. Its mascot is the penguin. Its flower is the pink rose. Its jewel is the emerald. Its nickname is KDChi.

== Philanthropy ==
Kappa Delta Chi is a service-based sorority. It supports two National Philanthropy endeavors, the Emerald Foundation for Kappa Delta Chi and the American Cancer Society. Undergraduate chapters hold an annual Bowl-A-Thon or KD Kickball event that funds the majority of the projects that the National Foundation sponsors. The Foundation receives, manages, and distributes scholarship funds, annual gifts, and other donations. It was formed in 1999.

== Governance ==
The sorority is governed by its board of directors, national administrative council, and a national council, composed of its alumnae. Annually, KDChi holds a national leadership conference. KDChi's national headquarters is in Lubbock, Texas.

== Chapters ==
KDChi has collegiate, graduate, and alumnae chapters across the United States. It has chartered 67 collegiate chapters.

== Notable members ==
- Natalia Anciso – Artist and educator
- Delia Garcia – Kansas Secretary of Labor
- Mary E. González – Texas State Representative
- Dolores Huerta (Honorary, Alpha Alpha chapter) – Civil and human rights activist
- Angela Salinas – Retired United States Marine Major General
- Gloria DeLeon – Co-Founder of the National Hispanic Institute

== See also ==
- List of social sororities and women's fraternities
- List of Latino fraternities and sororities
