= Ernesto Nieto =

- Born: October 6, 1940 (age 86); Houston, Texas
- Occupations: Founder & President; National Hispanic Institute; Writer
- Writing career
- Notable works: Third Reality: Crafting a 21st Century Latino Agenda; In the Midst of a Latino Leadership Crisis
- Notable awards: Honorary Doctor of Humane Letters Degree from Texas Wesleyan University; Meritorious Service Award & Distinguished Alumnus for Southwestern University,
- Website: www.nationalhispanicinstitute.org

Ernesto Nieto (born October 6, 1940) is the founder of the National Hispanic Institute and has served as President since the organization's inception in 1979. Born in Houston, Texas, Mr. Nieto attended Jefferson Davis High School and entered the University of Houston on an athletic scholarship. Nieto later transferred to Southwestern University in Georgetown, Texas, where he received his Bachelor of Arts degree in Education in 1964 with a specialization in special education. After working on his graduate degree at the University of Houston, he served in various management positions in both the state and federal government.

In 1979, Mr. Nieto left government to pursue his vision of creating a leadership institute for Latino youth. Thirty six years later, under his leadership, the National Hispanic Institute has worked with over 120 institutions of higher education and 70,000 high-ability youth from across the nation. In addition to his duties as chief executive officer of the National Hispanic Institute, Mr. Nieto serves on the Board of Trustees of Southwestern University as well as on the Board of Visitors. In 2001, he authored the book Third Reality: Crafting a 21st Century Latino Agenda.

== Awards & recognitions ==
Among his numerous recognitions, Ernesto Nieto has received the Eagle Leadership Award by the El Paso, Texas City Council, the Meritorious Service Award by Southwestern University, and honorary Doctor of Humane Letters degree from Texas Wesleyan University in Fort Worth, Texas. Mr. Nieto also has been honored as a "Distinguished Alumnus" of both Southwestern University and Jefferson Davis High School. Other awards include the Southwestern University's Citation of Merit Award for Community Service and the Human Relations Award from the National Association for College Admissions Counseling.

== Noted published works ==
Ernesto Nieto has written extensively, via the NHI regarding the future leadership need of the Latino community both in the United States as well as globally. His two most noted works are his creative non-fiction book Third Reality: Crafting a 21st Century Latino Agenda & In the Midst of a Latino Leadership Crisis published in Volume 19 2006- 2007 of the Harvard Journal of Hispanic Policy

=== Third Reality: Crafting a 21st Century Latino Agenda ===
In Third Reality: Crafting a 21st Century Latino Agenda, Ernesto Nieto chronicles the long and faith testing trials that he experienced during the early creation days of the National Hispanic Institute (NHI). Although the incorporation of NHI took place in 1979, Nieto refers to the true birth to have taken place sometime between 1903, the year of his father's birth, and 1940, the year Ernesto was born. He states in his book, "Third Reality is partly a confession to my father and mother, my way of admitting that the counsel they gave me as a young man growing up in Houston was correct in the final analysis. It's an account that's not unfamiliar to many of us as young Latinos growing up in the barrios back then thinking that having the opportunity to gain a little more education than our parents made us smarter, better prepared for life. Nothing could be farther from the truth", states Nieto (Third Reality Press). In essence, the National Hispanic Institute is the manifestation of the work laid out and lessons taught by his parents starting in the early 1940s, lessons which would not be fully realized and understood until later in his life.

Each chapter tells of how Ernesto, and Gloria de Leon, his lifelong friend, and wife, were forced to re-organize and discover their beliefs in order to create what we know today as NHI. How they went from struggling new non-profit to a nationally (internationally) recognized Institute; from 90 high school students per year to over 4,000 high school and college students a year.

The last chapter of the book, Ernesto discuss the process in which one begins to see one's community as a resource of immense equity, a place full of opportunity, what he calls the "Third Reality". He gives in detail his personal struggles to begin to re-construct his manner of thinking in order to begin the plan the principle the National Hispanic Institute has in the shaping of the Latino community.

=== In the midst of a Latino leadership crisis ===
In his article, Nieto outlines how all healthy, growing, and robust communities and organizations require ready access to a plentiful supply of skilled and educated leaders on whose shoulders invariably rest the future of others. He argues that the organized sectors that comprise U.S. Latino life, the availability of these individuals is not only in critically short supply, but is occurring during a modern, information-age that demands high accessibility to multidimensional talent in order to remain competitive.

== TV, news, and publication appearances ==
Nieto has appeared in publications and television broadcasts nationwide that include: The New York Times, Chicago Tribune, Houston Chronicle, Austin American-Statesman, ABC "World News Tonight", Austin Community College Spotlight, Univision, and Telemundo.

== Other work ==
Nieto continues his involvement in the community by serving as a consultant to colleges and universities regarding Latino student outreach and recruitment. He is also the founder of Third Reality Publications.

Preceded by First officeholder	President; National Hispanic Institute (NHI); 1979-present	Succeeded by
