= St. Mary's University School of Law =

Catholic law school in San Antonio, Texas, US

Coordinates: 29.460033°N 98.567329°W

- Parent school: St. Mary's University
- Established: 1927; 98 years ago
- School type: Private Catholic law school
- Dean: Patricia Roberts
- Location: San Antonio, Texas, US
- Enrollment: 773
- Faculty: 51 full-time, 53 part-time
- USNWR ranking: 148th (tie) (2025)
- Bar pass rate: 73.47% (2023 first-time takers)
- Website: law.stmarytx.edu
- ABA profile: St.Mary's

St. Mary's University School of Law is the law school of St. Mary's University, a private Society of Mary Catholic university in San Antonio, Texas.

== History ==
In October 1927, the San Antonio Bar Association established the San Antonio School of Law, which for seven years after its founding was administered by a board of governors under the control of the bar association. Until the School of Law became associated with a physical campus, classes were held at the Bexar County Courthouse. In an attempt to maximize the educational and material resources of the fledgling institution, the Board of Governors negotiated with St. Mary's University regarding a transfer of the School of Law's administrative control. The transfer was completed on October 1, 1934, and St. Mary's University School of Law was officially established.

The School of Law was then housed at St. Mary's University's original downtown campus at 112 College Street. Possessing several military bases, San Antonio experienced a surge of population and industry in the years immediately following the World War II. This exponential growth resulted in more law students. To meet these new demands adequately, the School of Law organized itself to meet the requirements of the American Bar Association and the Association of American Law Schools. It received accreditation from the ABA in February 1948 and became a member of the AALS in December 1949.

On December 19, 1967, the School of Law relocated from the College Street campus to join the main campus of St. Mary's, where an expansion project had provided for the addition of eight new buildings to the main University campus, including a lecture hall, law library, and faculty building comprising the Law Center.

- Arthur Yao, the first Chinese faculty member in the history of St. Mary's University School of Law.

== Academics ==
The School of Law has an enrollment of about 770 students, pursuing Juris Doctor (J.D.), Master of Laws (LL.M.), or Master of Jurisprudence (M.Jur.) degrees. The school has a fully online, part-time, 11-term, J.D. program accredited by the American Bar Association for a maximum of 25 students who have substantial outside responsibilities.

=== Admissions ===
For the class entering in 2023, the school accepted 819 (35.94%) of 2,279 applicants, with 281 of those accepted enrolling, a 34.31% yield rate. Three students were not included in the acceptance statistics. The class consists of 284 students. Of scores reported, the median LSAT score was 153 and the median undergraduate GPA was 3.38. Its 25th/75th percentile LSAT scores and GPA were 150/156 and 3.04/3.65. One student was not included in the LSAT calculation and four were not included in the GPA calculation.

=== Rankings ===
The 2024 Rankings by U.S. News & World Report place the school tied at No.153 of U.S. law schools, in the bottom 22%, and No.37 in part-time law.

== Bar examination passage ==
In 2023, the overall bar examination passage rate for the law school’s first-time examination takers was 73.47%. The Ultimate Bar Pass Rate, which the ABA defines as the passage rate for graduates who sat for bar examinations within two years of graduating, was 91.71% for the class of 2021.

== Employment ==
According to the schools's official ABA-required disclosures for 2022 graduates, within ten months after graduation 72.32% of the 224 graduating class was employed in full-time positions requiring bar passage (i.e. as attorneys), with 4.46% employed in full-time JD advantage positions. Positions were in various size law firms, most being in 1-10 attorney firms, two graduates obtained full-time local or state judicial clerkships, and 64 public interest, government, higher education, and business employment.

== Costs ==
The cost of full-time attendance (indicating the cost of tuition and fees) at St. Mary's for the 2023-24 academic year was $43,324. The 2023-24 cost for part-time attendance was $28,654.

== Centers ==
The Center for Terrorism Law aims to address "current and potential legal issues related to terrorism in light of the challenge of achieving and maintaining a proper balance between global security and civil justice." It recently secured a $1 million U.S. Department of Defense appropriation to study "Homeland Defense and Civil Support Threat Information Collection." This grant was conditioned upon "independent information gathering [by the Center] to compile and study all of the various state legislation that has been enacted (particularly since 9/11) related to how various state governments have chosen to balance the issue of increased security concerns and the protection of civil liberties." The Center is directed by Professor of Law Jeffrey Addicott .

The Center for International Legal Studies developed following the passage of the North American Free Trade Agreement (NAFTA) and the establishment of the North American Development Bank in San Antonio. The program was created to develop relationships with foreign universities and conduct public service outreach in the Mexico-U.S. border area. Through course offerings, overseas programs, faculty and student exchanges, and other activities, the Center offers extensive exposure to comparative and international law.

The Center for Legal and Social Justice permits students to act as the attorney of record for indigent clients who cannot find legal help elsewhere. It offers three clinical programs to students: the Civil Justice Clinic; the Immigration and Human Rights Clinic; the Criminal Justice Clinic. The center also houses the School of Law's pro bono program for which students may participate by volunteering in the community, including the Identification Recovery Program. Through the ID Recovery Program, students help those individuals without the means to obtain recovery of their identification credentials retrieve them—often at no cost to the individual. In addition, the Center for Legal and Social Justice recently partnered with the University of Texas School of Law Richard and Ginni Mithoff Pro Bono Program to launch the San Antonio Gender Affirmation Project. The inaugural clinic was held on April 20, 2019, at The Center — San Antonio Pride Center. Students from both of the law schools organized the clinic, with community stakeholders. The clinic was the culmination of the work of the volunteer attorneys, student attorney supervisors, local media, student volunteers, and the director of The Center, among others.

== Facilities ==
The Sarita Kenedy East Law Library, named after Sarita Kenedy East, is the largest legal information center in San Antonio and the surrounding area. A federal depository, the Library's collection consists of print, microfilm, and multimedia items totaling over 400,000 volumes (or equivalent). The facility includes two large reading rooms and shelving spaces, two computer labs, a Rare Book Room, an Alumni Room (for reading and receptions), 17 conference rooms (or group studies), 136 study carrels, three media/instruction classrooms, and three copy/printing centers. There is a popular reading area in the library with popular magazines and newspapers. There is also a student lounge for breaks and snacks. The library also houses the law review offices of the St. Mary's Law Journal and The Scholar. In addition, the library is home to the Office of Career Services.

In 2006, the Courtroom at St. Mary's underwent a $1 million renovation. The modernization project included the installation of information technology tools, which mirror that of the courtrooms in the Bexar County Courthouse. The Courtroom seats 300 and features interchangeable furniture and fixture configurations, suiting the needs of either appellate or trial proceedings. The full Texas Supreme Court, an en banc panel of Texas Courts of Appeals, and a panel of judges of the United States Court of Appeals for the Fifth Circuit has presided over mock proceedings in the Moot Courtroom.

== Publications ==
St. Mary's Law Journal
- Discipline: Law
- Language: English

Publication details
- History: 1969–present
- Publisher: St. Mary's University (United States)
- Frequency: Quarterly

Standard abbreviations
- Bluebook: St. Mary's L.J.
- ISO 4: St. Mary's Law J.

Indexing
- ISSN: 0581-3441
- LCCN: 70012297
- OCLC no.: 02643086

Links
- Journal homepage; Online archive

The School of Law is home to three legal periodicals: the St. Mary's Law Journal, St. Mary's Journal on Legal Malpractice & Ethics, and The Scholar: St. Mary's Law Review on Race and Social Justice.

- The Scholar: St. Mary's Law Review on Race and Social Justice focuses exclusively on legal issues that impact minorities across the world. The Scholar's inaugural issue was published in 1999.
- The St. Mary's Journal on Legal Malpractice & Ethics addresses legal malpractice and ethics issues that impact the daily work of legal practitioners.
- The St. Mary's Law Journal is produced by the students of St. Mary's University School of Law.

== Deans ==
Nine individuals have held the title of dean:

- 1927–1938, Anton N. Moursund
- 1938–1942, Henry B. Dielmann
- 1946–1978, Ernest A. Raba
- 1978–1989, James N. Castleberry Jr.
- 1989–1998, Barbara Bader Aldave
- 1998–2007, Robert William "Bill" Piatt
- 2007–2014, Charles E. Cantú
- 2014–2019, Stephen M. Sheppard
- 2019–2020, Vincent R. Johnson (interim)
- 2020–present, Patricia Roberts
