= Travis Bruce Moursund =

American politician (1901–1959)

Travis Bruce Moursund (July 9, 1901 – October 21, 1959) was an American politician.

Moursund served in the Texas House of Representatives from 1927 to 1929 and was a Democrat.
