= Albert Wadel Hansen Moursund =

American politician

Albert Wadel Hansen Moursund (May 13, 1845 – December 29, 1927) was an American judge and politician.

Moursund was born in Norway and emigrated to the United States in 1869. He settled in Austin, Texas. In 1873, Moursand was admitted to the Texas bar and practiced law in Blanco, Texas. He served in the Texas House of Representatives from 1881 to 1885 and was a Democrat. Moursund also served as Texas District Court judge. Morsrund was a Texas Ranger and fought in the Indian Wars. Moursund died at his home in Fredericksburg, Texas.
