= Albert W. Moursund III =

American lawyer and politician (1919–2002)

Albert W. Moursund
- Born: May 25, 1919
- Died: April 22, 2002 (aged 82)
- Citizenship: American
- Education: The University of Texas School of Law
- Notable work: lawyer and politician

Albert Wadel Moursund III (May 25, 1919 – April 22, 2002) was an American lawyer and politician.

== Biography ==
Moursund was born in Johnson City, Texas and graduated from Austin High School in Austin, Texas in 1936. In 1941, Moursund received his law degree from the University of Texas Law School and was admitted to the Texas bar. He practiced law in Johnson City, Texas. During World War II, Moursund served in the United States Army Air Forces and was commissioned a staff sergeant. Moursund served in the Texas House of Representatives from 1949 to 1953 and was a Democrat. He then served as county judge for Blanco County, Texas from 1953 to 1959. He was involved with the electric cooperative, insurance, abstract, and banking businesses. Moursund also owned several ranches. He was a friend and adviser to President Lyndon Johnson and his wife Lady Bird Johnson. Moursund died at his home in Round Mountain, Texas.
