= Mexican American Youth Organization =

Civil rights organization

The Mexican American Youth Organization (acronym MAYO, also described as the Mexican Youth Organization) is a civil rights organization formed in 1967 in San Antonio, Texas, USA to fight for Mexican-American rights. The creators of MAYO, Los Cinco (meaning "the five"), consisted of José Ángel Gutiérrez, Willie Velásquez, Mario Compean, Ignacio Pérez, and Juan Patlán. MAYO and its political organization, Raza Unida Party, played an important part in Texas history during the late 1960s and early 1970s. They were a part of the larger Chicano movement in the United States, and played a role in bringing about civil rights for Mexican-Americans.

== Formation ==
"The organization was born in March 1967 in San Antonio, where Méxicanos, who constituted some 40 percent of the population, were powerless and impoverished. It was the brain child of five young Chicano student activists-José Ángel Gutiérrez, Mario Compean, William "Willie" Velasquez, Ignacio Perez, and Juan Patlan. All were graduate or undergraduate students at Saint Mary's, a small liberal arts college in San Antonio (now Saint Mary's University). At the Fountain Room, a barseveral blocks form Saint Mary's, Los Cinco (as they became known), over the course of several weeks, met on a regular basis and held a number of study sessions, which culminated in MAYO."

== Activism ==
MAYO was involved in voter registration in South Texas. Founding member of MAYO Willie Velásquez was posthumously given the Presidential Medal of Freedom in 1995 by President Bill Clinton for his work with voter registration. MAYO did well at getting voters registered, but they were not successful in getting the Hispanic voters out to the polls to vote, especially in metropolitan areas.

School walkouts were a major part of MAYO’s approach to achieving equality for Mexican Americans. They staged walkouts at least 18 times, which helped enable Mexican Americans to take over seats on Texas school boards. The major walkouts were in Crystal City, Kingsville, Edgewood and Lanier High Schools in San Antonio. By becoming members of previously all-white school boards, MAYO was able to participate in deciding what was best for their own people.

MAYO led to the creation of Raza Unida Party (The Race United), a third party that found many of their first members in the ranks of MAYO, who played the central role in the creation of La Raza Unida Party, or RUP, which quickly spread to other states.

MAYO was later integrated into RUP and became the youth arm of the party. MAYO adopted a logo, appropriated from Aeronaves de México, an Aztec warrior inside a circle. It was later used in the Raza Unida Party logo as well. RUP candidates won elections in the 1970s.

The League of United Latin American Citizens (LULAC), one of the leading Hispanic groups in Texas, was considered by MAYO to be too soft in its approach to achieving equality for Mexican Americans.

Because of MAYO's tactics, which were diametrically opposed to LULAC's, it became known as the militant arm of the Chicano movement.

== Notes ==
Additional information on MAYO can be located at:

- The archives of the San Antonio Light and the Express News.
- The newspapers at Trinity University and at UTSA .
- The Institute of Texan Cultures and the Library at the University of Texas at Austin contain papers donated by José Angel Guitiérrez.
- The Handbook of Texas Online.
