= St. Mary's University, Texas =

Catholic university in San Antonio, Texas

St. Mary's University
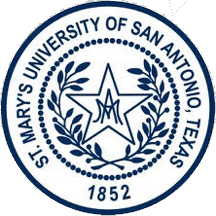
- Former names: St. Mary’s Institute (1852–1882); St. Mary's College (1882–1927); St. Louis College (1894–1923)
- Type: Private university
- Established: 1852; 174 years ago
- Religious affiliation: Roman Catholic (Marianist)
- Academic affiliations: ACCU; NAICU
- Endowment: $263 million (2024)
- President: Winston Erevelles
- Administrative staff: 212 full-time 147 part-time
- Undergraduates: 2,139
- Postgraduates: 1,319
- Location: San Antonio, Texas, U.S. 29.4531°N 98.5623°W
- Campus: Urban, 135 acres (55 ha)
- Colors: Gold and blue
- Nickname: Rattlers
- Sporting affiliations: NCAA Division II – Lone Star Conference
- Mascot: Rattler Man
- Website: www.stmarytx.edu

St. Mary's University is a private Catholic university in San Antonio, Texas, United States. Founded by the Society of Mary (Marianists) in 1852, St. Mary's is the oldest Catholic university in Texas and the American Southwest.

With a student population of nearly 4,000, St. Mary's is home to a College of Arts, Humanities and Social Sciences; School of Science, Engineering and Technology; the Greehey School of Business; and the St. Mary's University School of Law.

== History ==
Founded as St. Mary's Institute, the school opened on August 25, 1852, with a faculty of five and an enrollment of twelve boys. In 1921, all college classes were transferred from downtown to the St. Louis College campus. In 1923, St. Louis College became St. Mary's College with an enrollment of twelve in the freshman class. Grade school and high school students remained at the downtown school, which adopted the name St. Mary's Academy. The new St. Mary's College quickly gained senior college status and in 1927 the first class of bachelor's degree candidates graduated from the newly renamed St. Mary's University.

In 1932, the high school programs at St. Mary's Academy relocated from the College Street campus to become Central Catholic High School. After over a century as an all-male institution, St. Mary's opened its doors to female students in 1963 and became a coeducational university. In 1987, Polish-American silent film star Pola Negri left most of her estate to St. Mary's University, including a collection of memorabilia and several rare prints of her films. St. Mary's University also set up a scholarship in her name.

== Academics ==
Academic rankings

Master's
- Washington Monthly: 171

Regional
- U.S. News & World Report: 17 (West)

National
- Forbes: 561
- WSJ/College Pulse: 495 (tied)

St. Mary's is accredited by the Southern Association of Colleges and Schools. In addition, the Greehey School of Business is accredited by the Association to Advance Collegiate Schools of Business (AACSB). Electrical and industrial engineering programs in the School of Science, Engineering and Technology are recognized through accreditation by the Accreditation Board for Engineering and Technology (ABET). St. Mary’s has a student to faculty ratio of 11 to 1.

=== Admissions ===
In 2024, the university accepted 86.2% of applicants, with those admitted having an average 3.61 GPA. Submission of SAT or ACT scores is not required, St. Mary's University being a test optional school. Those submitting test scores had an average 1120 SAT or average 23 ACT score.

=== Rankings ===
For 2024, U.S. News & World Report ranked St. Mary's No.17 out of 118 Regional Universities West, No.1 in Regional Universities West Best Value Schools, tied for No.9 in Regional Universities West Top Performers on Social Mobility, No.12 in Regional Universities West Best Colleges for Veterans, and tied for No.131 in Best Undergraduate Engineering Programs at schools where a doctorate is not offered.

=== Law school ===
In October 1927, the San Antonio Bar Association established the San Antonio School of Law, and for seven years after its founding was administered by a board of governors under the control of the bar association. Until the School of Law became associated with a physical campus, classes were held at the Bexar County Courthouse. In an attempt to maximize educational and material resources of the fledgling institution, the Board of Governors negotiated with St. Mary's University regarding a transfer of the School of Law's administrative control. The transfer was completed on October 1, 1934, and St. Mary's University School of Law was officially established.

The School of Law was then housed at St. Mary's University's then downtown campus at 112 College Street, situated near the San Antonio River Walk. Possessing several military bases, San Antonio experienced a surge of population and industry in the years immediately following World War II. This exponential growth resulted in more law students. To meet these new demands adequately, the School of Law organized itself to meet the requirements of the American Bar Association and the Association of American Law Schools. It received accreditation from the ABA in February 1948 and became a member of the AALS in December 1949.

On December 19, 1967, the School of Law relocated from the College Street campus to join the main campus of St. Mary's. A multimillion-dollar expansion project had provided for the addition of eight new buildings to the main University campus, including a lecture hall, law library, and faculty building. The school held its first classes in January, 1968.

Since 1968, the school has had several structures rededicated, renovated, or expanded, including the Law Administration Building, housing the office of the dean; the Law Classroom Building; and the Sarita Kenedy East Law Library, named after Sarita Kenedy East and dedicated in 1984 after the John G. and Marie Stella Kenedy Memorial Foundation gave the School of Law $7.5 million to fund its construction in January 1982.

In 2024, the School of Law was ranked tied for 153rd out of 196 law schools by U.S. News & World Report.

== Athletics ==
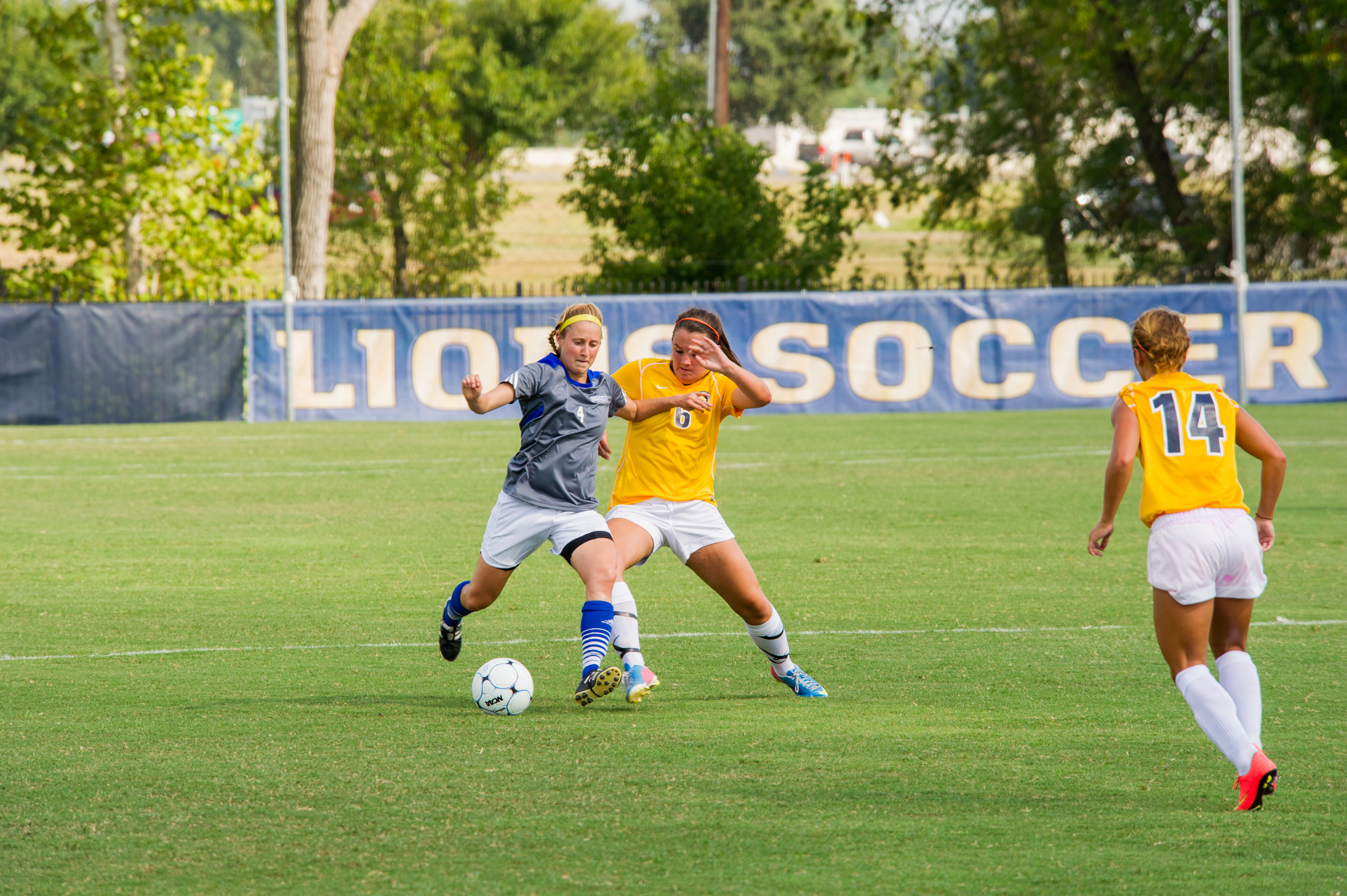
The Rattlers women's soccer team in action against the Texas A&M–Commerce Lions in 2014

St. Mary's University is a member of NCAA Division II and the Lone Star Conference and sponsors 12 men's and women's sports at the varsity level. St. Mary's has won four team national championships in men's basketball (1989), baseball (2001), softball (1986 and 2002), and one individual national title in men's golf (2006). In 2020, St. Mary's launched an E-Sports team.

== Student life ==
There are a total of 68 registered organizations. During the beginning of the semester, the Office of Resident Life, in cooperation with student organizations, hosts a "Rattler Round Up" for incoming freshmen and other students.

Most of the students live in one of the 13 residence halls. These halls are divided among upper and lower classmen with some being mixed, but no strict enforcement is placed upon the assignment of rooms.

=== Events ===
In April, St. Mary's University and the city of San Antonio plays host to Fiesta San Antonio. On campus, the university hosts Oyster Bake, a combination of concerts, food stalls, and carnival rides. The university has played host to the event since 1916 and it has since become a major event in the city culturally and economically. The event is open to students, who are also able to participate in "Rattler Fest" which is a exclusive festival for St. Mary's students prior to the larger Oyster Bake.

=== Greek life ===
St. Mary's University is home to ten Greek-Letter Organizations, no Greek organization is permitted to have a house due to a city ordinance preventing boarding homes. Every Friday Greek Life hosts Quad where every active social fraternity and sorority hangout behind St. Louis Hall on Fridays, and is a popular gather spot for the university community.

Many of the Greek Life events that are open to the university community are organized by the campus Fraternity and Sorority Life department.

Sororities on campus include:

- Alpha Sigma Tau
- Alpha Phi
- Sigma Sigma Sigma
- Delta Zeta
- Kappa Delta Chi

Fraternities campus include:

- Kappa Sigma
- Sigma Phi Epsilon
- Lambda Chi Alpha
- Sigma Lambda Beta
- Alpha Sigma Phi

== See also ==
- St. Mary's University School of Law
