= List of chief justices of the Supreme Court of Texas =

The Chief Justice of Texas presides at the Texas Supreme Court, which is the top appellate court for civil matters in the Texas court system. The chief justice (and all the justices) are elected statewide in partisan elections. The term of the chief justice is six years. The position was created in the Texas Constitution of 1876. The current chief justice is Jimmy Blacklock.

== Chief justices ==
| Name | Party | Term | Left office |
|---|---|---|---|
| George F. Moore | Democrat | 1878-1881 | Resigned |
| Robert S. Gould | Democrat | 1881-1882 | Defeated |
| Asa H. Willie | Democrat | 1882-1888 | Retired |
| John W. Stayton | Democrat | 1888-1894 | Died |
| Reuben R. Gaines | Democrat | 1894-1911 | Retired |
| Thomas J. Brown | Democrat | 1911-1915 | Died |
| Nelson Phillips | Democrat | 1915-1921 | Resigned |
| Calvin Maples Cureton | Democrat | 1921-1940 | Died |
| W.F. Moore | Democrat | 1940-1941 | Retired |
| James P. Alexander | Democrat | 1941-1948 | Died |
| J.E. Hickman | Democrat | 1948-1961 | Retired |
| Robert W. Calvert | Democrat | 1961-1972 | Retired |
| Joe R. Greenhill | Democrat | 1972-1982 | Retired |
| Jack Pope | Democrat | 1982-1985 | Retired |
| John L. Hill, Jr. | Democrat | 1985-1988 | Resigned |
| Thomas R. Phillips | Republican | 1988-2004 | Retired |
| Wallace B. Jefferson | Republican | 2004-2013 | Resigned |
| Nathan L. Hecht | Republican | 2013–2024 | Retired |
| Jimmy Blacklock | Republican | 2025–Present | Incumbent |
