= List of justices of the Supreme Court of Texas =

This is a list of the judges of the Texas Supreme Court.

== Justices of the Republic of Texas, 1836–1845 ==
The Constitution of the Republic of Texas provided for a Supreme Court to consist of a chief justice and associate justices. The associate justices were the judges of the eight district courts of Texas. The district judges, whose first session was January 13, 1840, served with the chief justice as associate justices from January 13, 1840 to December 29, 1845, when Texas was admitted into the United States:

=== Succession of seats ===
Chief Justice
Established by the Constitution of the Republic of Texas; Enabling Act, Dec. 15, 1836
Michael Jordan	1836–1838 (Note: Elected by Texas Congress, died in office, June 1838.)
George Floyd	1838 (Note: Appointed by President Sam Houston, the Senate would not ratify the appointment.)
Thomas Jefferson	1838–1840 (Note: Elected by Texas Congress, resigned May 1840.)
John Hemphill	1840–1845 (Note: Elected by Texas Congress.)

First District
Established by the Constitution of Republic of Texas; Enabling Act, Dec. 22, 1836
Shelby Corzine	1836–1839 (Note: Elected by Texas Congress, died in office, February 1839.)
Ezekiel Wimberly Cullen	1839 (Note: Appointed by President Mirabeau B. Lamar.)
Anthony B. Shelby	1839–1841 (Note: Elected by Texas Congress, resigned September 1841. Both Shelby and Johnson attempted to hold court at the same time)
Thomas Johnson (Texas jurist)	1841 (Note: Elected by Texas Congress, resigned September 1841.)
Richard Morris (Texas jurist)	1841–1844 (Note: Appointed, then elected by Texas Congress, died in office August 1844.)
John Baker Jones	1844–1845 (Note: Appointed, then elected by Texas Congress.)

Second District
Established by the Constitution of Republic of Texas; Enabling Act, Dec. 22, 1836
Benjamin Cromwell Franklin	1836–1839 (Note: Elected by Texas Congress, resigned February 1839.)
Henry W. Fontaine	1839 (Note: Appointed by President Lamar, resigned after one month.)
William Jefferson Jones	1840–1845 (Note: Elected by Texas Congress.)

Third District
Established by the Constitution of Republic of Texas; Enabling Act, Dec. 22, 1836
Robert McAlpin Williamson	1836–1839 (Note: Elected by Texas Congress, resigned January 1839.)
John T. Mills	1839–1840 (Note: Elected by Texas Congress, youngest member (21 at election). Later on court from 7th District.)
Robert Emmett Bledsoe Baylor	1841–1845 (Note: Elected by Texas Congress.)

Fourth District
Established by the Constitution of Republic of Texas; Enabling Act, Dec. 22, 1836
James W. Robinson	1836–1840 (Note: Elected by Texas Congress, resigned January 1839.)
John Hemphill	1840 (Note: Elected by Texas Congress, became Chief Justice December 1840.)
Anderson Hutchinson	1841–1843 (Note: Elected by Texas Congress, resigned June 1843.)
William E. Jones	1843–1845 (Note: Elected by Texas Congress.)

Fifth District
Established by the Constitution of Republic of Texas; Enabling Act, May 24, 1838
Edward Thomas Branch	1838–1840 (Note: Elected by Texas Congress, resigned June 1840.)
George Whitfield Terrell	1840–1842 (Note: Appointed by President Lamar, elected by Texas Congress the following year, resigned January 1842.)
William Beck Ochiltree	1842–1845 (Note: Elected by Texas Congress, resigned December 1844.)
Royall Tyler Wheeler	1845 (Note: Elected by Texas Congress.)

Sixth District
Established by the Constitution of Republic of Texas; Enabling Act, Jan. 29, 1840
Richardson A. Scurry	1840–1841 (Note: Elected by Texas Congress, resigned February 1841.)
Patrick Churchill Jack	1841–1844 (Note: Elected by Texas Congress, died in office.)
Milford Phillips Norton	1844–1845 (Note: Appointed by President Houston and elected by the Texas Congress.)

Seventh District
Established by the Constitution of Republic of Texas; Enabling Act, Jan. 29, 1840
John M. Hansford	1840–1842 (Note: Elected by Texas Congress, resigned before impeachment.)
John T. Mills	1843–1845 (Note: Elected by Texas Congress. Previously on court from 3rd District.)

== Justices 1845 to 1876 ==
=== Under the Constitutions of 1845 and 1861 ===
==== Chief justices ====
John Hemphill (March 1846 to October 1858)
Royall T. Wheeler (October 1858 to April 1864)
Oran M. Roberts (November 1864 to June 1866)

==== Associate justices ====
Abner S. Lipscomb (March 1846 to November 1856)
Oran M. Roberts (April 1857 to October 1862)
George F. Moore (October 1862 to June 1866)
Royall T. Wheeler (March 1846 to October 1858)
James H. Bell (October 1858 to August 1864)
Reuben A. Reeves (November 1864 to June 1866)

=== Under the Constitution of 1866 (1866 to 1870) ===
Removed by U.S. military authorities in 1867:

George F. Moore (Chief Justice, August 1866 to September 1867)
Richard Coke (August 1866 to September 1867)
S. P. Donley (October 1866 to September 1867)
Asa H. Willie (August 1866 to September 1867)
George W. Smith (August 1866 to September 1867)

Appointed by U.S. military authorities to replace them:

Amos Morrill (Chief Justice, September 1867 to July 1870)
Livingston Lindsay (September 1867 to July 1870)
Albert H. Latimer (September 1867 to November 1869)
James Denison (January 1870 to July 1870)
Colbert Caldwell (September 1867 to October 1869)
Chauncey Brewer Sabin (March 1870, no record of service)
Andrew J. Hamilton (November 1867 to October 1869)
Moses B. Walker (December 1869 to July 1870)

=== Under the Constitution of 1868 (1870 to 1876) ===
Three justices from July 5, 1870 to January 29, 1874

Lemuel D. Evans (Chief Justice, July 1870 to August 1873)
Wesley Ogden (July 1870 to August 1873; Chief Justice, August 1873 to January 1874)
Moses B. Walker (July 1870 to January 1874)
J. D. McAdoo (August 1873 to January 1874)

Five justices from January 29, 1874 to April 18, 1876

Oran M. Roberts (Chief Justice, January 1874 to April 1876)
Reuben A. Reeves (January 1874 to April 1876)
Thomas J. Devine (January 1874 to September 1875)
John Ireland (September 1875 to April 1876)
George F. Moore (February 1874 to April 1876)
William P. Ballinger (February 3, 1874, resigned same day)
Peter W. Gray (February 1874 to April 1876)
Robert S. Gould (May 1874 to April 1876)

== Justices under the Constitution of 1876 (1876 to present) ==
=== Justices 1876 to 1945 ===
==== Chief justices ====
George F. Moore (November 1878 to November 1881)
Robert S. Gould (November 1881 to December 1882)
Asa H. Willie (December 1882 to March 1888)
John W. Stayton (March 1888 to July 1894)
Reuben R. Gaines (July 1894 to January 1911)
Thomas J. Brown (January 1911 to May 1915)
Nelson Phillips (June 1915 to November 1921)
Calvin Maples Cureton (December 1921 to April 1940)
W. F. Moore (April 1940 to January 1941)
James P. Alexander (January 1941 to 1948)
J. E. Hickman (1948 to 1961)
Robert W. Calvert (1961 to 1972)
Joe R. Greenhill (1972 to 1982)
Jack Pope (1982 to 1985)
John L. Hill Jr. (1985 to 1988)
Thomas R. Phillips (January 4, 1988 to January 2004)
Wallace B. Jefferson (January 2004 to October 1, 2013)
Nathan L. Hecht (October 1, 2013 to December 31, 2024)
James D. Blacklock (January 2025 to present)

==== Associate justices ====
Robert S. Gould (April 1876 to November 1881)
John W. Stayton (November 1881 to March 1888)
A. S. Walker (April 1888 to January 1889)
J. L. Henry (January 1889 to May 1893)
Thomas J. Brown (May 1893 to January 1911)
William F. Ramsey (January 1911 to April 1912)
Nelson Phillips (April 1912 to June 1915)
James E. Yantis (June 1915 to March 1918)
Thomas B. Greenwood (April 1918 to December 1934)
John H. Sharp (December 1934 to September 1945)

George F. Moore (April 1876 to October 1878)
Micajah H. Bonner (November 1878 to December 1882)
Charles S. West (December 1882 to September 1885)
Sawnie Robertson (October 1885 to September 1886)
Reuben R. Gaines (September 1886 to July 1894)
Leroy G. Denman (July 1894 to May 1899)
F. A. Williams (May 1899 to April 1911)
Joseph Burton Dibrell Jr. (April 1911 to January 1913)
William E. Hawkins (January 1913 to January 1921)
William Pierson (judge) (January 1921 to April 1935)
Richard Critz (May 1935 to January 1945)
Gordon Simpson (January 1945 to September 1949)

=== Justices from 1945 ===
After 1945, Texas dispensed with the convention of referring to justices other than the chief justice as "associate justices", and simply referred to them as "justices".

==== Chief Justice, Place 1 ====
James P. Alexander (September 21, 1945 to January 1, 1948)
J. E. Hickman (January 7, 1948 to January 3, 1961)
Robert W. Calvert (January 3, 1961 to October 4, 1972)
Joe R. Greenhill (October 4, 1972 to October 25, 1982)
Jack Pope (November 29, 1982 to January 4, 1985)
John L. Hill Jr. (January 5, 1985 to January 4, 1988)
Thomas R. Phillips (January 4, 1988 to September 3, 2004)
Wallace B. Jefferson (September 20, 2004 to October 1, 2013)
Nathan Hecht (October 1, 2013 to December 31, 2024)
Jimmy Blacklock (January 2025 to present)

==== Justices, Place 2 ====
John H. Sharp (September 21, 1945 to December 31, 1952)
Frank P. Culver Jr. (January 1, 1953 to December 21, 1964)
Jack Pope (January 4, 1965 to November 29, 1982)
Ted Z. Robertson (December 2, 1982 to December 31, 1988)
Lloyd Doggett (January 1, 1989 to December 31, 1994)
Priscilla R. Owen (January 1, 1995 to June 6, 2005. Appointed as a judge on the United States Court of Appeals for the Fifth Circuit.)
Don Willett (August 24, 2005 to January 2, 2018. Appointed as a judge on the United States Court of Appeals for the Fifth Circuit.)
Jimmy Blacklock (January 2, 2018 to December 31, 2024.)

==== Justices, Place 3 ====
Gordon Simpson (September 21, 1945 to March 1, 1949)
R. H. Harvey (March 1, 1949 to September 8, 1950, died in office)
Robert W. Calvert (September 18, 1950 to January 3, 1961)
Zollie Steakley (January 3, 1961 to December 31, 1980)
James P. Wallace (January 1, 1981 to September 1, 1988)
Eugene A. Cook (September 1, 1988 to December 31, 1992)
Rose Spector (January 1, 1993 to December 31, 1998)
Harriet O'Neill (January 1, 1999 to June 20, 2010)
Debra Lehrmann (June 21, 2010 to present. Term ends December 31, 2028.)

==== Justices, Place 4 ====
Graham B. Smedley (September 21, 1945 to June 16, 1954)
Ruel C. Walker (October 19, 1954 to September 30, 1975)
Ross E. Doughty (October 1, 1975 to December 31, 1976)
Don Yarbrough (January 1, 1977 to July 1977)
Charles W. Barrow (July 25, 1977 to September 30, 1984)
Raul A. Gonzalez (October 8, 1984 to December 31, 1998)
Alberto R. Gonzales (January 14, 1999 to December 22, 2000. Resigned to become White House counsel to President George W. Bush.)
Wallace B. Jefferson (April 18, 2001 to September 20, 2004. Appointed chief justice in September 2004.)
David M. Medina (November 10, 2004 to December 31, 2012)
John P. Devine (January 2013 to present. Term ends December 31, 2024.)

==== Justices, Place 5 ====
William M. Taylor (September 21, 1945 to December 31, 1950)
Will Wilson (January 2, 1951 to June 1, 1956)
Abner V. McCall (June 15, 1956 to December 31, 1956)
James R. Norvell (January 1, 1957 to October 10, 1968)
Thomas M. Reavley (October 10, 1968 to October 1, 1977)
T. C. Chadick (October 5, 1977 to December 31, 1978)
Robert M. Campbell (December 1, 1978 to February 1, 1988)
Barbara Culver (February 1, 1988 to December 7, 1988)
Jack English Hightower (December 7, 1988 to January 1, 1996)
Greg Abbott (January 2, 1996 to June 6, 2001)
Xavier Rodriguez (September 7, 2001 to November 6, 2002)
Steven Wayne Smith (November 20, 2002 to December 31, 2004)
Paul W. Green (January 1, 2005 to August 31, 2020)
Rebeca Aizpuru Huddle (October 2020 to present. Term ends December 31, 2028.)

==== Justices, Place 6 ====
J. E. Hickman (September 21, 1945 to January 5, 1948)
W. St. John Garwood (January 14, 1948 to December 31, 1958)
Robert W. Hamilton (January 1, 1959 to December 31, 1970)
James G. Denton (January 1, 1971, to June 10, 1982, died in office.)
Ruby Kless Sondock (June 25, 1982 to December 31, 1982)
William W. Kilgarlin (January 1, 1983 to December 31, 1988)
Nathan L. Hecht (January 1, 1989 to October 1, 2013)
Jeff Brown (October 3, 2013 to September 4, 2019)
Jane Bland (September 4, 2019 to present. Term expires December 31, 2024.)

==== Justices, Place 7 ====
C. S. Slatton (September 21, 1945 to October 1, 1947)
James P. Hart (October 1, 1947 to November 15, 1950)
Clyde E. Smith (November 15, 1950 to December 31, 1970)
Price Daniel (January 1, 1971 to December 31, 1978)
Franklin S. Spears (January 1, 1979 to December 31, 1990)
John Cornyn (January 2, 1991 to October 18, 1997)
Deborah Hankinson (October 28, 1997 to December 31, 2002)
Dale Wainwright (January 1, 2003 to September 30, 2012)
Jeffrey S. Boyd (December 3, 2012 to September 1, 2025)
Kyle D. Hawkins (October 24, 2025 to present. Term expires December 31, 2026.)

==== Justices, Place 8 ====
Few Brewster (September 21, 1945 to September 20, 1957)
Joe R. Greenhill (October 1, 1957 to October 4, 1972
Hawthorne Phillips (October 4, 1972 to December 31, 1972)
Samuel D. Johnson Jr. (January 1, 1973 to October 16, 1979)
Will Garwood (November 15, 1979 to December 31, 1980)
C. L. Ray Jr. (November 25, 1980 to December 31, 1990)
Robert Gammage (January 1, 1991 to August 31, 1995)
James A. Baker (September 1, 1995 to August 31, 2002)
Michael H. Schneider (September 6, 2002 to September 20, 2004)
Phil Johnson (April 11, 2005 to December 31, 2018)
J. Brett Busby (March 20, 2019, to present. Term ends December 31, 2026)

==== Justices, Place 9 ====
A. J. Folley (September 21, 1945 to April 1, 1949)
Meade F. Griffin (April 1, 1949 to December 31, 1968)
Sears McGee (January 1, 1969 to December 31, 1986)
Oscar Mauzy (January 3, 1987 to December 31, 1993)
Craig T. Enoch (January 1, 1993 to October 1, 2003)
Scott A. Brister (November 21, 2003 to September 7, 2009)
Eva Guzman (October 8, 2009 to June 11, 2021)
Evan A. Young (November 2021 to present. Term ends December 31, 2028)
