= Justice Robertson =

Justice Robertson may refer to:

- Alexander George Morison Robertson (1867–1947), associate justice of the Supreme Court of Hawaii
- Edward D. Robertson Jr. (born 1952), chief justice of the Supreme Court of Missouri
- George Morison Robertson (1821–1867), associate justice of the Supreme Court of Hawaii
- James L. Robertson (Mississippi judge) (fl. 1960s–1990s), associate justice of the Supreme Court of Mississippi
- Sawnie Robertson (1850–1892), associate justice of the Texas Supreme Court
- Ted Z. Robertson (1921–2017), justice of the Texas Supreme Court
- William J. Robertson (1817–1898), chief justice of the Supreme Court of Virginia

== See also ==
- Judge Robertson (disambiguation)
