= Justice Bonner =

Justice Bonner may refer to:

- John W. Bonner (1902–1970), associate justice of the Montana Supreme Court
- Micajah H. Bonner (1828–1883), associate justice of the Texas Supreme Court
