= Justice Reeves =

Justice Reeves may refer to:

- John Reeves (judge) (born 1952), justice of the Supreme Court of the Northern Territory
- John Reeves (activist) (1752–1829), first Chief Justice of Newfoundland
- Reuben A. Reeves (1821–1908), justice of the Supreme Court of Texas

== See also ==
- Tamika Montgomery-Reeves (born 1981), associate justice of the Delaware Supreme Court
- Judge Reeves (disambiguation)
