= J. L. Henry =

American politician and judge (1831–1907)

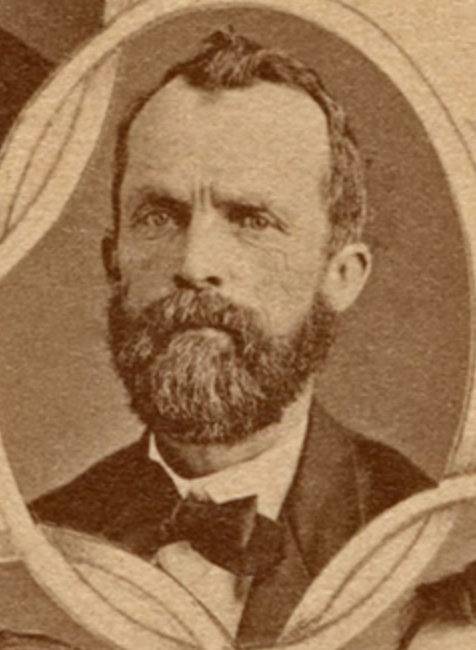
- Henry's portrait for the 13th Texas Legislature

Member of the Texas Senate from the 6th district
- In office January 14, 1873 – January 13, 1874
- Preceded by: James Postell Douglas
- Succeeded by: John Lafayette Camp

Associate Justice of the Supreme Court of Texas
- In office November 1888 – May 1893
- Preceded by: A. S. Walker
- Succeeded by: Thomas Jefferson Brown

Personal details
- Born: John Lane Henry; October 18, 1831 Culpeper County, Virginia, US
- Died: October 21, 1907 (aged 76) Dallas, Texas, US
- Resting place: Greenwood Cemetery
- Party: Democratic
- Occupation: Politician, judge

Military service
- Allegiance: Confederate States of America
- Branch/service: Confederate States Army
- Years of service: 1862–1865
- Unit: 20th Texas Infantry Regiment
- Battles/wars: American Civil War

John Lane Henry (October 18, 1831 – October 21, 1907) was an American politician and judge. A Democrat, he was a member of the Texas Senate from 1873 to 1874, and later was an Associate Justice of the Supreme Court of Texas from 1889 to 1893.

== Early life and education ==
Henry was born on October 18, 1831, in Culpeper County, Virginia. At age two of five, he and his parents moved to Mufreesboro, Tennessee. He studied at Union University. In 1852, he moved to Huntsville, Texas. He read law in 1854 and 1855, being admitted to the bar in 1855.

== Career ==
After being admitted to the bar, Henry began practicing law in Livingston in 1856. The Waco Times-Herald claims he then moved to Coke County, with him living there until 1876. (Note: Him having lived in Coke County is likely true. However, due to representing the 13th Senate district from 1873 to 1874, situated in East Texas, he could not have lived there until 1876.) In 1860, he was elected district attorney of Texas's 13th Judicial District. In 1862, during the American Civil War, he enlisted into the 20th Texas Infantry Regiment, of the Confederate States Army, serving until the end of the war defending the state's coastline.

In 1869, Henry moved to Tyler. In 1870, he was a United States Attorney pro tempore, representing the Western District of Texas. A Democrat, he was a member of the Texas Senate, serving from January 14, 1873, to January 13, 1874, representing the 6th district. While serving, he was chairman of the Committee on the Judiciary, and was a member of the Committees on Constitutional Amendments; and on the Land Office.

Henry practiced law in partnership with Stockton P. Donley, until Donley's death in 1871. He then partnered with Tignal W. Jones. He was a delegate to the 1875 Texas Constitutional Convention, serving on its judiciary committee; The Waco Times-Herald claims he was instead a delegate to the 1876 Convention. He was partnered with Jones until 1879 or 1880, when Henry moved to Dallas, where he joined Leake, Weilborn & Henry, working together until November 1888, when appointed to the Supreme Court of Texas.

In Dallas, Henry engaged in the politics of East Dallas, then a separate city, serving as its mayor and alderman, for two terms and one term, respectively. In 1885, he was director of the Dallas and Wichita Railway Company. From November 1888 to May 1893, he was an Associate Justice of the Supreme Court of Texas, having been appointed; the Tarlton Law Library claims his term began in 1889. He afterwards returned to private law practice.

== Personal life and death ==
On December 26, 1860, Henry married Cornelia Jameson (or Jamison), with whom he had five children. By 1905, he retired. He died on October 21, 1907, aged 76, in Dallas, following two months of illness. He was buried at Greenwood Cemetery, in Dallas.

== Notes ==
Political offices
Preceded by A. S. Walker	Justice of the Texas Supreme Court; 1889–1893	Succeeded by Thomas Jefferson Brown
Preceded by James Postell Douglas	Texas State Senator from District 6; 1874–1876	Succeeded by John Lafayette Camp
