= James H. Bell =

American judge (1825–1892)

James Hall Bell (January 21, 1825 – March 13, 1892) was a justice of the Supreme Court of Texas from October 1858 to August 1864).

== Biography ==
James Hall Bell was born in West Columbia, Texas on January 2, 1825. He graduated from Centre College and Harvard Law School.

He died in Austin in March 1892.

Political offices
Preceded by Royall T. Wheeler	Justice of the Texas Supreme Court; 1858–1864	Succeeded by Reuben A. Reeves
