= James E. Yantis =

American state supreme court justice (1856–1918)

James E. Yantis (April 13, 1856 – December 1, 1918) was a justice of the Texas Supreme Court from June 1915 to March 1918.

Born in Columbus, Kentucky, Yantis moved with his family moved to Texas in the early 1870s, settling in Collin County, Texas. After graduating from Sam Houston Normal School (now Sam Houston State University) in 1883, he read law in the office of John Church in McKinney, Texas, to gain admission to the bar in 1887. Yantis entered the practice of law in Sweetwater, Texas, moving to Waco, Texas in 1893. While practicing there, Yantis represented accused murderer Thomas J. Fulcher in a high-profile case. Fulcher had previously been convicted of the murder at issue, but the prior conviction had been set aside several years after the initial conviction; in the retrial, Yantis successfully persuaded the jury to convict Fulcher of a lesser offense of assault with intent to kill, and was then able to have the Texas Court of Appeals dismiss the conviction on the grounds that the statute of limitations for charging that crime had passed. In 1896, Yantis was elected to the Texas Senate, representing Texas Senate District 11. He resigned from that seat in 1897 to serve as assistant attorney general.

In 1915, Governor James E. Ferguson appointed Yantis to a seat on the Texas Supreme Court vacated by the elevation of Nelson Phillips to the office of Chief Justice following the death of the previous chief justice, Thomas Jefferson Brown. He was re-elected to the seat in 1916, serving until March 1918, when he resigned due to poor health. He died later that year, and was buried in Oakwood Cemetery.

Political offices
Preceded by Nelson Phillips	Justice of the Texas Supreme Court; 1915–1918	Succeeded by Thomas B. Greenwood
