= George Fleming Moore =

George Fleming Moore may refer to:

- George F. Moore (Texas judge) (1822–1883), American chief justice of the Supreme Court of Texas
- George F. Moore (United States Army officer) (1887–1949), American military officer
