= William Pierson (disambiguation) =

William Pierson (1926–2004) was an American television, motion picture and stage actor.

William Pierson may also refer to:

- William Pierson Jr. (1911–2008), American painter and historian
- William Pierson (baseball) (1899–1959), Major League pitcher
- William Pierson (judge) (1871–1935), Justice of the Supreme Court of Texas
