= Clyde E. Smith =

American judge (1897–1971)

Clyde Earl Smith (July 31, 1897 – May 22, 1971) was a justice of the Supreme Court of Texas from November 15, 1950 to December 31, 1970.

Political offices
Preceded by James P. Hart	Justice of the Texas Supreme Court; 1950–1970	Succeeded by Franklin S. Spears
