= Justice Harvey =

Justice Harvey may refer to:

- John Musgrave Harvey (1865–1940), justice and acting chief justice of the Supreme Court of New South Wales
- Lawson Harvey (1856–1920), associate justice of the Supreme Court of Indiana
- R. H. Harvey (1893–1950), justice of the Texas Supreme Court
- William West Harvey (1869–1958), associate justice of the Kansas Supreme Court

== See also ==
- Judge Harvey (disambiguation)
