= Justice Garwood =

Justice Garwood may refer to:

- William Lockhart Garwood (1931–2011), associate justice of the Supreme Court of Texas
- W. St. John Garwood (1896–1987), associate justice of the Supreme Court of Texas
