= Royall T. Wheeler =

Chief Justice of the Texas Supreme Court
- In office 1857–1864

Personal details
- Born: August 23, 1810 Vermont
- Died: April 8, 1864 (aged 53) Washington County, Texas

Royall Tyler Wheeler (or Royal; August 23, 1810 – April 8, 1864) was an American judge who served as Chief Justice of the Texas Supreme Court. Between 1857 and 1860, he was the first head of the Baylor Law School. He is the namesake of Wheeler County, Texas, and its county seat.

== Biography ==
Wheeler was born in Virginia and moved to Ohio before completing his legal preparation. He moved to Fayetteville, Arkansas, where he became a partner of Williamson S. Oldham in law practice. After marrying Emily Walker, he moved in 1839 to San Augustine, Texas, where he was in law practice with future Republic of Texas vice president Kenneth Lewis Anderson. By 1842, Wheeler became a district attorney in Texas, and he was named a district judge and associate judge on the Supreme Court of the Republic of Texas three years later. He remained on the Supreme Court as an Associate Justice when Texas was annexed by the United States in 1845, and he became a Chief Justice of the Supreme Court of Texas in 1857.

That same year, Wheeler was named the founding head of the first iteration of the Baylor Law School. At that time, Baylor was located in Independence, Texas. Fellow faculty members included Robert Emmett Bledsoe Baylor. Early graduates of the school included future Chief Justice of Texas Thomas J. Brown and future state penitentiary superintendent Thomas J. Goree. Wheeler was also on the law school faculty at Austin College.

In 1864, saddened by the impending defeat of the South in the Civil War, Wheeler committed suicide in Washington County, Texas. He was succeeded as Chief Justice by Oran Milo Roberts, who later became Governor of Texas. About 15 years after Wheeler's death, Wheeler County, Texas (and a town of the same name) were organized and named after him.
