= Judge Reeves =

Judge Reeves may refer to:

- Albert L. Reeves (1873–1971), judge of the United States District Court for the Western District of Missouri
- Carlton W. Reeves (born 1964), judge of the United States District Court for the Southern District of Mississippi
- Danny C. Reeves (born 1957), judge of the United States District Court for the Eastern District of Kentucky
- Pamela L. Reeves (1954–2020), judge of the United States District Court for the Eastern District of Tennessee

== See also ==
- Justice Reeves (disambiguation)
