= Graham B. Smedley =

American judge (1879–1954)

Graham Best Smedley (November 10, 1879 – June 16, 1954) was a justice of the Supreme Court of Texas from September 21, 1945 to June 16, 1954.

Political offices
Preceded by Newly created seat	Justice of the Texas Supreme Court; 1945–1954	Succeeded by Ruel C. Walker
