= Joseph Burton Dibrell Jr. =

American judge (1855–1934)

Joseph Burton Dibrell Jr. (December 1, 1855 – April 11, 1934) was a justice of the Supreme Court of Texas from April 1911 to January 1913.

Dibrell represented District 21 in the Texas Senate in the 24th, 25th, 26th, and 27th Texas legislatures. He was president pro tempore of the Texas Senate for the 25th Texas legislature from 1894 to 1902.

== Early life, education and political career. ==
Dibrell was born in Kentucky and moved to Seguin, Texas, in 1857. He completed school in Seguin and left for college, graduating college in Virginia in 1879. He then returned to Seguin, was a school teacher for 10 months and took private law studies with Harry M. Wurzbach. Admitted to the bar in 1882, he then began his law practice. Then was 21st District State Senator from 1894 to 1902, and president pro tem of the Senate in 1897. Also served as an associate justice of the Texas supreme court 1911 to 1913.

== Death ==
Dibrell died April 11, 1934, in Seguin. He was buried in the San Geronimo Cemetery.

Political offices
Preceded by F. A. Williams	Justice of the Texas Supreme Court; 1911–1913	Succeeded by William E. Hawkins
