= Thomas Morrow Reavley =

American judge (1921–2020)

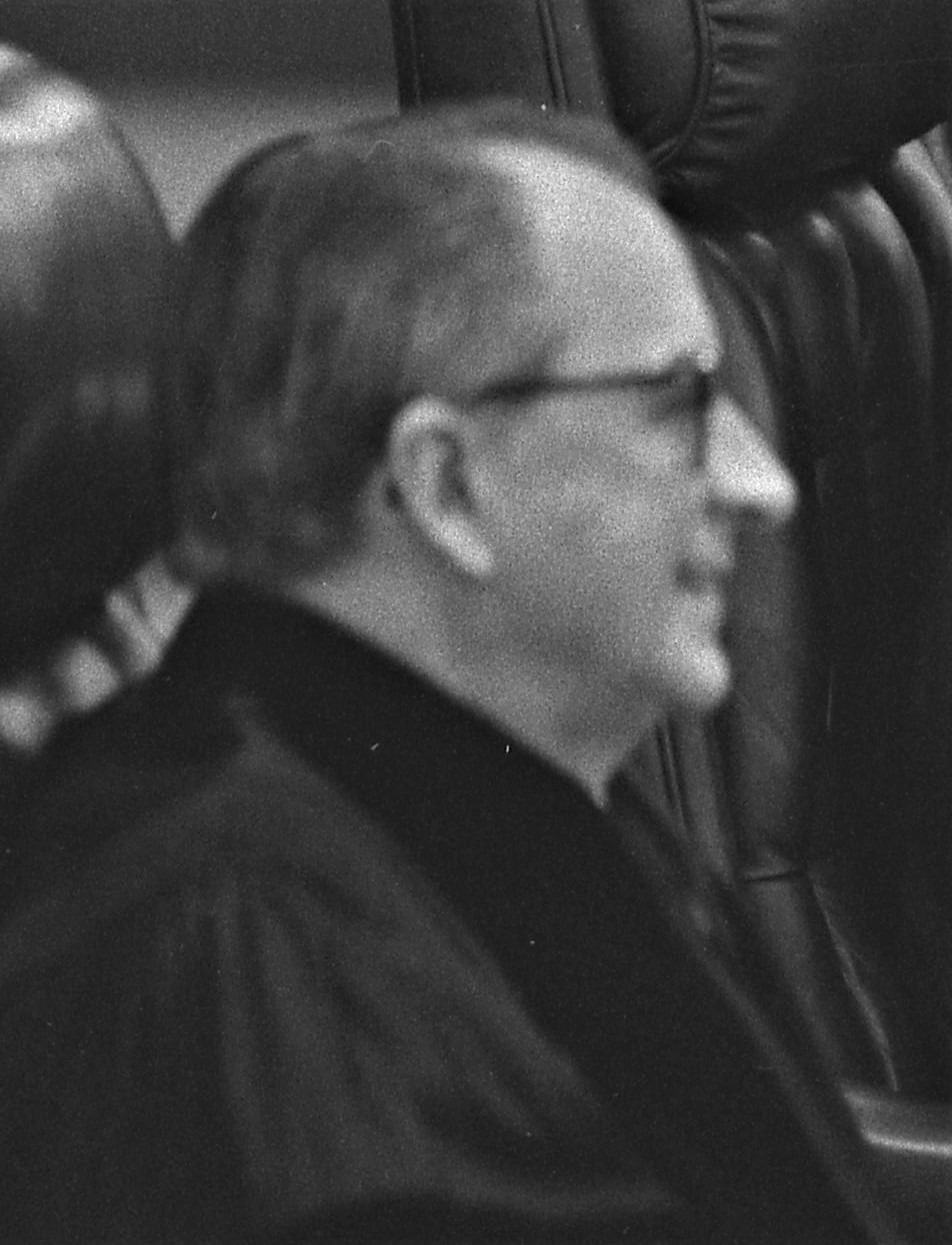
- Reavley in 1985

Senior Judge of the United States Court of Appeals for the Fifth Circuit
- In office August 1, 1990 – December 1, 2020

Judge of the United States Court of Appeals for the Fifth Circuit
- In office July 13, 1979 – August 1, 1990
- Appointed by: Jimmy Carter
- Preceded by: Seat established by 92 Stat. 1629
- Succeeded by: Emilio M. Garza

Texas Secretary of State
- In office November 1, 1955 – January 16, 1957
- Governor: Allan Shivers
- Preceded by: Al Muldrow
- Succeeded by: Zollie Steakley

Personal details
- Born: June 21, 1921 Quitman, Texas, U.S.
- Died: December 1, 2020 (aged 99) Houston, Texas, U.S.
- Spouse: Carolyn Dineen King (m. 2004)
- Education: University of Texas at Austin (BA); Harvard University (JD); University of Virginia (LLM)

Thomas Morrow Reavley (June 21, 1921 – December 1, 2020) was an American jurist who was a United States circuit judge of the United States Court of Appeals for the Fifth Circuit.

== Biography ==
Reavley was born in Quitman, Texas. He received a Bachelor of Arts degree from the University of Texas in 1942. While at the University of Texas, he was a member of the Tejas Club. He was in the United States Navy from 1942 to 1946. As a naval lieutenant, Reavley drove President Franklin Roosevelt to Roosevelt’s meeting with Winston Churchill and Joseph Stalin at the Yalta Conference.

After World War II, he received a Juris Doctor from Harvard Law School in 1948. He later received a Master of Laws from the University of Virginia School of Law in 1983.

He was an assistant district attorney of Dallas, Texas, from 1948 to 1949. He was in private practice of law in Nacogdoches, Texas from 1949 to 1951. He was a county attorney of Nacogdoches County, Texas in 1951. He was in private practice of law in Lufkin, Texas from 1951 to 1952. He was in private practice of law in Jasper, Texas from 1952 to 1955. He was Texas Secretary of State from 1955 to 1957. He was in private practice of law in Austin, Texas from 1957 to 1964. He was a Judge of the 167 Judicial District in Austin, Texas from 1964 to 1968. He was a justice of the Supreme Court of Texas from 1968 to 1977. He was in private practice of law in Austin from 1977 to 1979. He was a Special Judge of the Texas Court of Criminal Appeals in 1978.

== Federal judicial service ==
Reavley was nominated by President Jimmy Carter to the United States Court of Appeals for the Fifth Circuit on May 17, 1979, to a new seat created by 92 Stat.1629. He was confirmed by the United States Senate on July 12, 1979, and received commission on July 13, 1979. He assumed senior status on August 1, 1990.

== Notable cases ==
On October 24, 2017, Reavley ruled that a sheriff violated the Constitution when he held Jessica Jauch in jail for 96 days before she was brought before a judge. Undercover footage had shown that Jauch was innocent, and the charges against her were dropped after she saw a judge. The full court denied en banc on March 29, 2018. In March 2019, a jury awarded Jauch $250,000 in damages.

== Personal life ==
Reavley married fellow Fifth Circuit judge Carolyn Dineen King in August 2004. He died on December 1, 2020, at the age of 99.

== See also ==
- List of United States federal judges by longevity of service

== Sources ==
- University of Texas Law Library biography

Political offices
Preceded by Al Muldrow	Secretary of State of Texas; 1955-1957	Succeeded by Zollie Steakley
Legal offices
Preceded by Seat established by 92 Stat. 1629	Judge of the United States Court of Appeals for the Fifth Circuit; 1979–1990	Succeeded by Emilio M. Garza
