= Ross E. Doughty =

American judge (1910–2000)

Ross E. Doughty (June 27, 1910 – March 18, 2000) was a justice of the Supreme Court of Texas from October 1, 1975 to December 31, 1976.

Political offices
Preceded by Ruel C. Walker	Justice of the Texas Supreme Court; 1975–1976	Succeeded by Don Yarbrough
