= A. S. Walker =

American attorney, judge and newspaperman (1826–1896)

Justice of the Supreme Court of Texas
- In office March or April 1888 – January 1, 1889
- Preceded by: John W. Stayton
- Succeeded by: J. L. Henry

Personal details
- Born: Alexander Stuart Walker; August 18, 1826 Brownsburg, Virginia, US
- Died: August 14, 1896 (aged 69) Austin, Texas, US
- Party: Democratic
- Children: 2, including Alexander Jr.
- Occupation: Attorney, judge, newspaperman

Military service
- Branch/service: Confederate States Army
- Years of service: –1862
- Battles/wars: American Civil War

Alexander Stuart Walker (August 18, 1826 – August 14, 1896) was an American attorney, judge and newspaperman, who was justice of the Supreme Court of Texas from March or April 1888 to January 1, 1889.

== Early life and education ==
Walker was born on August 18, 1826, near Brownsburg, Virginia, to John Cowan and Virginia Walker (née Stuart). He studied at Wabash and South Hanover College, graduating in 1850 and moving to Shelby County, Kentucky, until 1852, moving to the Greater Houston.

A peer of future Texas governor J. Pinckney Henderson, Walker was licensed to practice law in January 1853. He later moved to Georgetown, Texas, and in July, R. E. B. Baylor appointed him as its district clerk. He later returned to South Hanover and received an M.A.

== Career ==
In 1858, Walker was elected to the Seventeenth Judicial District of Texas. A Democrat, he served in the Confederate States Army during the American Civil War, until 1862, when he won a race for a district judge role.

After the war, Walker moved to Austin in 1865, where in 1873, he became the first Editor-in-Chief of the Democratic Statesman—later became the Austin American-Statesman—which he helped found. He also continued his attorney career in Austin, such as when he partmered with Alexander W. Terrell, a partnership which held until Walker was appointed judge of the Sixteenth Judicial District of Texas in 1880, serving until 1884. He was then appointed by Oran Milo Roberts to the Supreme Court of Texas, serving from March or April 1888, until January 1, 1889. He became the court reporter in June.

== Personal life and death ==
Walker married twice. His first marriage was to Anna Jane Wilbarger, having two children—including Alexander Jr., who went on to become a lawyer. Following her death, he married Mary Maxwell Bowers, having no children together. He was also a Presbyterian and Freemason. He died on August 14, 1896, aged 69, in Austin, and was interred at Oakwood Cemetery.

Political offices
Preceded by John W. Stayton	Justice of the Texas Supreme Court; 1888–1889	Succeeded by J. L. Henry
