= W. St. John Garwood =

American judge

Wilmer St. John Garwood (December 15, 1896 – January 15, 1987) was an American lawyer and judge. He served as a justice of the Texas Supreme Court from January 14, 1948, to December 31, 1958.

== Early life and education ==
Born in Bastrop, Texas, his father was H. M. Garwood, a county judge who served in both houses of the state legislature. Garwood attended St. Thomas High School in Houston, Texas graduating in 1908.

He received a B.A. from Georgetown University in Washington, D.C. in 1917, and served stateside from the end of World War I in 1918 to 1923, as a first lieutenant in the Texas National Guard. He gained admission to the bar in Texas in 1919, and received an L.L.B. from Harvard University in 1922, also gaining admission to the New York Bar the following year.

== Legal career ==
Garwood began his legal career in New York City, as an attorney for Texaco from 1922 to 1923. He then worked for the law firm of Baker, Botts, Parker and Garwood in Houston from 1924 to 1928. The following year, he moved to Buenos Aires, Argentina to serve as resident American counsel for the Standard Oil Company of New Jersey until 1933. After returning to Texas, he joined the firm of Andrews, Kelley, Kurth and Campbell in Houston, from 1934 to 1941. At this point, World War II was underway, during which Garwood served in Naval Intelligence, achieving the rank of Lieutenant Commander. After the war, he returned to private practice in Houston, from 1945 to 1947.

In 1948, he was appointed to the Texas Supreme Court by Governor Beauford H. Jester, to fill the vacancy created by the elevation of Associate Justice J. E. Hickman, following the death of Chief Justice James P. Alexander. Garwood narrowly retained the seat in the general election later that year, and was again reelected in 1952. Garwood also served as acting Chief Justice at several points in his tenure, when the sitting Chief Justice was ill, and played a significant role in bringing about the construction of a new state supreme court building.

Garwood retired from the court in 1958, and became an attorney of counsel to the law firm of Graves, Dougherty, Hearon and Moody in Austin, Texas. He also taught as a visiting professor of law at Southern Methodist University and the University of Texas. In 1963, Governor John Connally sought to appoint Garwood to the Board of Regents of the University of Texas, but the nomination was rejected by the Texas Senate due to Garwood's perceived liberalism regarding racial segregation and certain international issues.

== Personal life ==
He married Ellen Clayton in 1927, with whom he had two sons.

He died following an illness, and was interred at Texas State Cemetery in Austin.

Political offices
| Preceded by J. E. Hickman | Justice of the Texas Supreme Court; 1948–1958 | Succeeded by Robert W. Hamilton |
