= Carolyn Dineen King =

American judge (born 1938)

Carolyn King
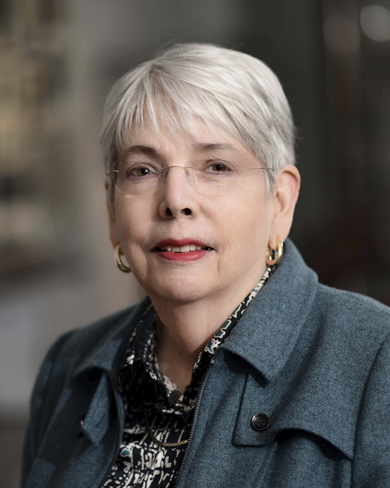

Senior Judge of the United States Court of Appeals for the Fifth Circuit
- Incumbent
- Assumed office December 31, 2013

Chief Judge of the United States Court of Appeals for the Fifth Circuit
- In office January 16, 1999 – January 30, 2006
- Preceded by: Henry Anthony Politz
- Succeeded by: Edith Jones

Judge of the United States Court of Appeals for the Fifth Circuit
- In office July 13, 1979 – December 31, 2013
- Appointed by: Jimmy Carter
- Preceded by: Seat established
- Succeeded by: James C. Ho

Personal details
- Born: January 30, 1938 (age 88) Syracuse, New York, U.S.
- Spouse: Thomas Reavley (m. 2004; died 2020)
- Education: Smith College (BA); Yale University (LLB)

Carolyn Dineen King (born January 30, 1938) is a Senior United States circuit judge of the United States Court of Appeals for the Fifth Circuit. Her chambers are in Houston, Texas.

== Education and career ==
Born in Syracuse, New York, King received a Bachelor of Arts degree in philosophy, summa cum laude, from Smith College in 1959. She received a Bachelor of Laws from Yale Law School in 1962. After the United States Attorney's office in Houston denied her a position as an Assistant United States Attorney—which she believes was because of her gender—she joined Fulbright & Jaworski as a corporate and securities lawyer. She was in private practice of law in Houston, Texas from 1962 to 1979.

== Federal judicial service ==
King was nominated by President Jimmy Carter on April 30, 1979, to the United States Court of Appeals for the Fifth Circuit, to a new seat created by 92 Stat. 1629. She was confirmed by the United States Senate on July 12, 1979, and received her commission on July 13, 1979. She served as the first female chief judge from 1999 to 2006. She assumed senior status on December 31, 2013. She was nominated and served until January 1, 1988, under the name Carolyn Dineen Randall. In 2002, at the request of Chief Justice William Rehnquist, she became the first woman to chair the executive committee of the Judicial Conference of the United States.

== Honors and awards ==
In 2007, King received the Edward J. Devitt Distinguished Service to Justice Award from the American Judicature Society. King is also a 1997 recipient of the Smith College Medal and the American Bar Association's Margaret Brent Award. In 2014, she was honored by the American College of Bankruptcy with its Distinguished Service award.

== Notable activities ==
King was elected to the American Law Institute in 1985 and was elected to the ALI Council in 1991. She served as ALI's Treasurer from May 2010 to May 2013.

== Personal life ==
King served under the name Carolyn Dineen Randall from 1979 to 1988. She married senior Fifth Circuit Judge Thomas Morrow Reavley in August 2004.

King is widely considered to be a political and judicial moderate.

== Notable case ==
On December 18, 2019, King dissented when the Fifth Circuit declared the Affordable Care Act's individual mandate unconstitutional.

== See also ==
- List of United States federal judges by longevity of service

Legal offices
New seat	Judge of the United States Court of Appeals for the Fifth Circuit; 1979–2013	Succeeded by James C. Ho
Preceded by Henry Anthony Politz	Chief Judge of the United States Court of Appeals for the Fifth Circuit; 1999–2006	Succeeded by Edith Jones
