= F. A. Williams =

American judge (1851–1945)

Frank Alvan Williams (October 6, 1851 – January 30, 1945) was a justice of the Supreme Court of Texas from May 1899 to April 1911.

Political offices
Preceded by Leroy G. Denman	Justice of the Texas Supreme Court; 1899–1911	Succeeded by Joseph Burton Dibrell Jr.
