= Few Brewster =

American judge (1889–1957)

Few Brewster (May 10, 1889 – October 12, 1957) was a justice of the Supreme Court of Texas from September 21, 1945, to September 20, 1957.

Political offices
Preceded by Newly created seat	Justice of the Texas Supreme Court; 1945–1957	Succeeded by Joe R. Greenhill
