= William F. Ramsey =

American judge (1855–1922)

Judge William F. Ramsey
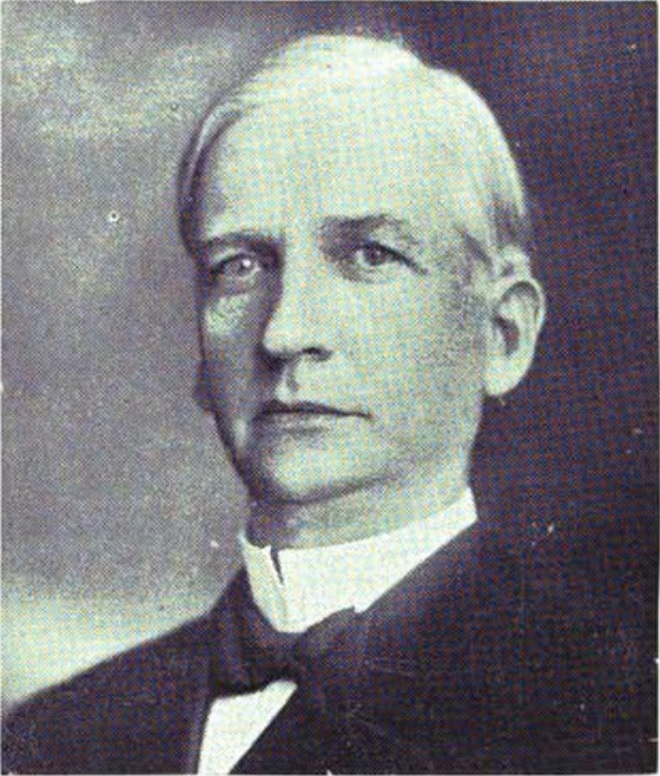
- William F. Ramsey, as shown in the Texas Bankers Record in 1916

Justice of the Supreme Court of Texas
- In office January 1911 – May 29, 1912
- Appointed by: Thomas Mitchell Campbell
- Preceded by: Thomas J. Brown
- Succeeded by: Nelson Phillips

Judge of the Texas Court of Criminal Appeals
- In office 1908 – January 1911
- Appointed by: Thomas Mitchell Campbell

Personal details
- Born: William Franklin Ramsey; October 25, 1855 Bell County, Texas, U.S.
- Died: October 27, 1922 (aged 67) Dallas, Texas, U.S.
- Children: 7
- Relatives: Ramsey Clark (grandson)
- Education: Trinity University (BA, LLB, MA)
- Occupation: Attorney, banker, and Texas Supreme Court judge

William Franklin Ramsey (October 25, 1855 – October 27, 1922) was an American attorney, banker, and justice of the Texas Supreme Court from 1911 to 1912.

== Early life and education ==
William Franklin Ramsey was born in Bell County, Texas. He attended the local schools of nearby Johnson County, Texas, where his father's mercantile business brought the family. Ramsey received all his degrees from Trinity University in Tehuacana, Texas: a B.A. in 1876, LL.B. in 1877, and an M.A. in 1883.

== Career ==
=== Legal and financial career ===
Ramsey entered the practice of law in 1877, maintaining a law practice in Cleburne from 1877 to 1909. Developing an interest in banking, he served as an officer and director of the Cleburne National Bank; he also became a stockholder in other banking institutions. Between 1900 and 1908, he was serving as president of three separate banks—the Cleburne National Bank, the First National Bank at Covington, Texas, and the Farmer and Trader's Bank at Rio Vista, Texas.

=== Judicial and political career ===
In 1907, Governor Thomas Mitchell Campbell appointed Ramsey to chair the board of commissioners of the Texas prison system, and in 1908, Campbell tapped Ramsey to fill a vacancy on the Texas Court of Criminal Appeals, in Austin, Texas. Ramsey won the election to that seat in November 1909, and served in that capacity until 1911, when he resigned to accept an appointment from Campbell to the Texas Supreme Court. Ramsey "served conspicuously on the bench, some of his rulings handed down in the higher courts of Texas attracting considerable attention". On May 29, 1912, Ramsey resigned from the Supreme Court to become a candidate for Governor of Texas, running for the Prohibition Party, but losing to the Democratic candidate, Oscar Branch Colquitt.

Ramsey remained in Austin, where he resumed the practice of law, in partnership with his son, S. D. Ramsey, until 1916, when he moved to Dallas, Texas to accept an appointment as Federal Reserve Agent of the Eleventh District, and chairman of the board of directors of the Federal Reserve Bank of Dallas.

== Personal life ==
Ramsey married his first wife in 1878; they had one son. After her death in 1885, he remarried in 1886 and had six more children. Ramsey died on October 27, 1922, in his home in Dallas.

One of Ramsey's children by his second wife was his daughter, Mary Jane Ramsey, who met Tom C. Clark while both were attending the University of Texas, and married Clark in 1924, two years after Ramsey's death. Clark went on to become Attorney General of the United States and a justice of the United States Supreme Court. Clark's son (and Ramsey's grandson) Ramsey Clark also served as Attorney General of the United States.

Political offices
| Preceded by Thomas J. Brown | Justice of the Texas Supreme Court; 1911–1912 | Succeeded by Nelson Phillips |
