= Robert W. Hamilton (judge) =

American judge (1899–1981)

Robert William Hamilton (March 24, 1899 – August 9, 1981) was a justice of the Supreme Court of Texas from January 1, 1959 to December 31, 1970.

Political offices
| Preceded by W. St. John Garwood | Justice of the Texas Supreme Court; 1959–1970 | Succeeded by James G. Denton |
