= William E. Hawkins =

American judge (1863–1937)

William E. Hawkins (September 23, 1863 – July 23, 1937) was a justice of the Supreme Court of Texas from January 1913 to January 1921. He was a candidate for the Democratic nomination for governor in the 1928 Texas gubernatorial election. He finished third of five candidates with 4% of the vote.

Political offices
Preceded by Joseph Burton Dibrell Jr.	Justice of the Texas Supreme Court; 1913–1921	Succeeded by William Pierson
