= Leroy G. Denman =

American judge (1855–1916)

Leroy Gilbert Denman (October 31, 1855 – September 14, 1916) was a justice of the Supreme Court of Texas from July 1894 to May 1899. Leesville, Texas, is majorly encompassed by his remaining landed estate and legacy.

Political offices
Preceded by Reuben R. Gaines	Justice of the Texas Supreme Court; 1894–1899	Succeeded by F. A. Williams
