= Judge Harvey =

Judge Harvey may refer to:

- Alexander Harvey II (1923–2017), judge of the United States District Court for the District of Maryland
- Matthew Harvey (1781–1866), judge of the United States District Court for the District of Massachusetts
- R. James Harvey (1922–2019), judge of the United States District Court for the Eastern District of Michigan

== See also ==
- Judge Steve Harvey, 2022 American arbitration-based reality court comedy show hosted by Steve Harvey
- Justice Harvey (disambiguation)
