= James P. Hart =

American judge (1904–1987)

James Pinckney Hart (November 11, 1904 – May 10, 1987) was a justice of the Supreme Court of Texas from October 1, 1947, to November 15, 1950. He was elected as the inaugural Chancellor of the University of Texas System on July 24, 1950, and served in the position until January 1, 1954. He graduated from the University of Texas at Austin and Harvard Law School.

Political offices
Preceded by C. S. Slatton	Justice of the Texas Supreme Court; 1947–1950	Succeeded by Clyde E. Smith
