= Ruel C. Walker =

American judge (1910–1998)

Ruel Carlile Walker (February 26, 1910 – May 9, 1998) was a justice of the Supreme Court of Texas from October 19, 1954 to September 30, 1975.

Born in Cleburne, Texas, Walker received a B.A. from the University of Texas at Austin in 1931 and an LL.B. from the University of Texas School of Law in 1934.

In 1954, Governor Allan Shivers appointed Walker to a seat on the Texas Supreme Court vacated by Graham B. Smedley.

Political offices
Preceded by Graham B. Smedley	Justice of the Texas Supreme Court; 1954–1975	Succeeded by Ross E. Doughty
