= Richard Critz =

American judge (1877–1959)

Richard Critz (October 16, 1877 – April 1, 1959) was a justice of the Supreme Court of Texas from May 1935 to January 1945.

Political offices
Preceded by William Pierson	Justice of the Texas Supreme Court; 1935–1945	Succeeded by Gordon Simpson
