= C. S. Slatton =

American judge (1895–1951)

Charles Stewart Slatton (March 13, 1895 – February 23, 1951) was a justice of the Supreme Court of Texas from September 21, 1945, to October 1, 1947.

Political offices
Preceded by Newly created seat	Justice of the Texas Supreme Court; 1945–1947	Succeeded by James P. Hart
