= Judge Robertson =

Judge Robertson may refer to:

- James Robertson (judge) (1938–2019), judge of the United States District Court for the District of Columbia
- Alexander George Morison Robertson (1867–1947), territorial United States district judge for Hawaii before serving as chief justice of the Supreme Court of Hawaii
- Thomas B. Robertson (1779–1828), judge of the United States District Courts for the Eastern and Western Districts of Louisiana

== See also ==
- Justice Robertson (disambiguation)
