= Gordon Simpson (judge) =

American judge (1894–1987)

Gordon Simpson (October 30, 1894 – February 13, 1987) was a justice of the Supreme Court of Texas from January 1945 to September 1949.

== Early life, education, and career ==
Born in Gilmer, Texas, Simpson attended Gilmer High School, graduating in 1911. After attending Baylor University from 1911 to 1913, he received a B.A. from the University of Texas at Austin in 1915. He served in the United States Army during World War I, from 1917 to 1918, achieving the rank of first lieutenant.

Simpson received an LL.B. from the University of Texas in 1919, and practiced law briefly in Pecos, Texas, then moved to Tyler, Texas, where he joined his father's law firm. Simpson remained in Tyler until 1942, serving in the Texas House of Representatives from 1923 to 1927, as a judge for the Seventh Judicial District in 1930, and as president of the State Bar of Texas from 1941 to 1943. He again served in the U.S. Army during World War II, from 1942 to 1944, in the judge advocate general's department. During this period, he attained the rank of lieutenant colonel.

== Judicial service and later life ==
Simpson won a seat on the Supreme Court of Texas in 1944, while still serving overseas. His name was placed on the ballot by Texas lawyers, and he was elected by a margin of 75,000 votes. In 1948, his supreme court service was interrupted by a return to Europe to participate in the review of Nazi war crime convictions, in the Dachau trials. In one case that he reviewed, he recommended life imprisonment rather than execution for twelve Germans convicted of killing 100 Americans during the Battle of the Bulge. He resigned from the supreme court the following year to take an executive role with the General American Oil Company (later Phillips Petroleum Company), of which he later served as president, from 1955 to 1960. After that, he associated with the law firm of Thompson & Knight until his death.

Simpson died from heart failure at Presbyterian Hospital at the age of 92.

Political offices
Preceded by Richard Critz	Justice of the Texas Supreme Court; 1945–1949	Succeeded by R. H. Harvey
