= Camp Cureton =

Confederate fortification in Texas, US

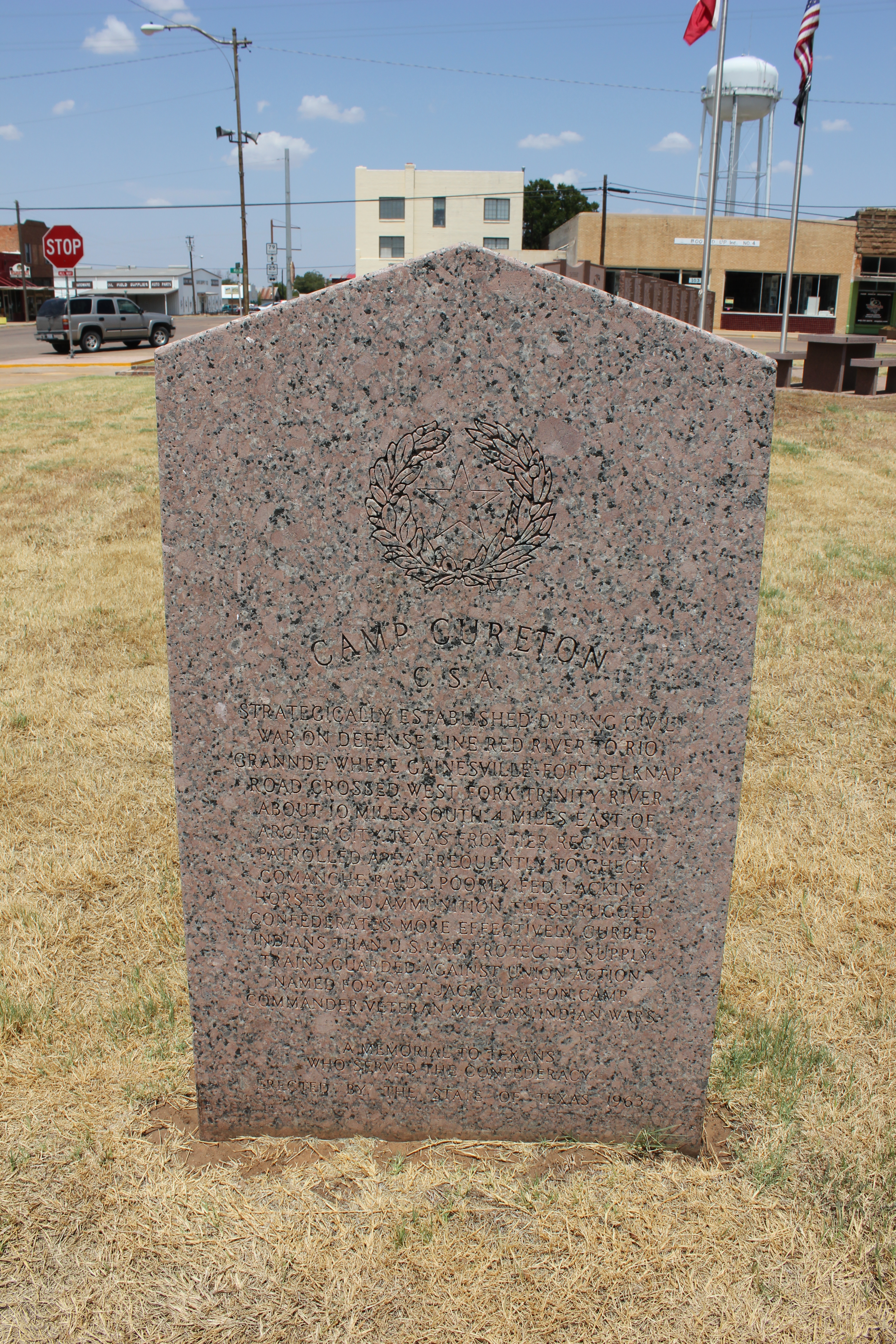
- Texas Historical Commission placard in Archer City, Texas, commemorating Camp Cureton

Site information
- Type: Fortress
- Controlled by: Confederate States Army

Site history
- Built: March 17, 1862

Camp Cureton was a Confederate fortification situated beside the Trinity River's west fork, near Archer City, Texas. Founded March 17, 1862, it was controlled by the Frontier Regiment to defend against attacks from Indian Territory fighters. The camp was named for J. J. Cureton (c. 1826–1881), who was a captain in the Confederate Army and previously a soldier in the Mexican–American War. He was also a grandfather a judge Calvin Maples Cureton. It was consolidated by Fort Belknap by March 1864, and by 1990, was mostly collapsed. In 1963, a historical marker outside Archer County Courthouse and Jail was installed, commemorating Camp Cureton.
