= Franklin S. Spears =

American judge (1931–1996)

Franklin Scott Spears (August 20, 1931 – April 10, 1996) was a justice of the Supreme Court of Texas from January 1, 1979 to December 31, 1990.

Political offices
| Preceded by Price Daniel | Justice of the Texas Supreme Court; 1979–1990 | Succeeded by John Cornyn |
