= Lloyd Doggett =

American politician and attorney (born 1946)

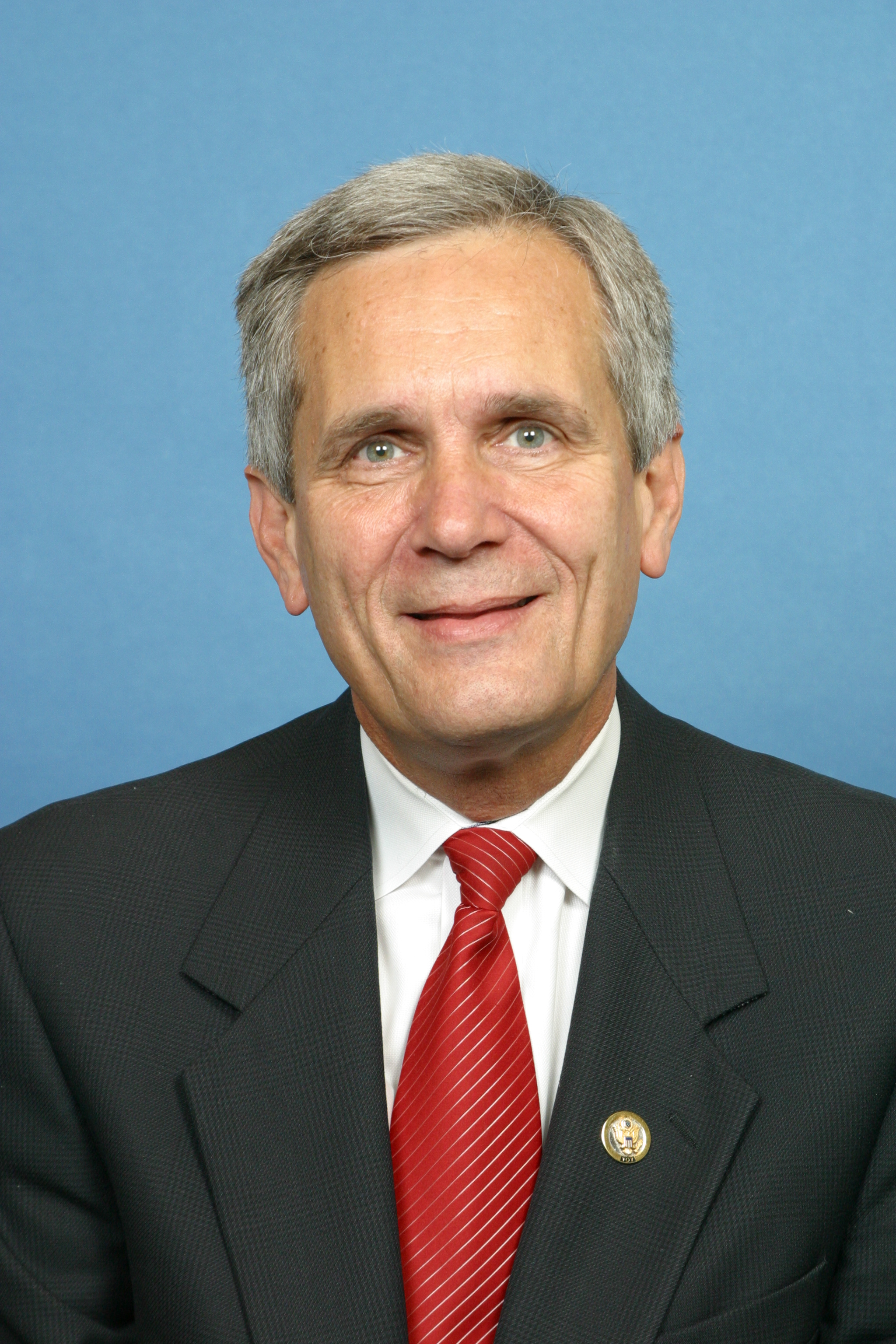
- Official portrait, 2004

Member of the U.S. House of Representatives from Texas
- Incumbent
- Assumed office January 3, 1995
- Preceded by: J. J. Pickle
- Constituency: 10th district (1995–2005); 25th district (2005–2013); 35th district (2013–2023); 37th district (2023–present)

Justice of the Texas Supreme Court
- In office January 1, 1989 – December 31, 1994
- Preceded by: Ted Robertson
- Succeeded by: Priscilla Owen

Member of the Texas Senate from the 14th district
- In office August 18, 1973 – January 8, 1985
- Preceded by: Charles Herring
- Succeeded by: Gonzalo Barrientos

Personal details
- Born: Lloyd Alton Doggett II; October 6, 1946 (age 80) Austin, Texas, U.S.
- Party: Democratic
- Spouse: Libby Belk (m. 1969)
- Children: 2
- Education: University of Texas, Austin (BA, JD)
- Website: House website
- Doggett's voice Doggett supporting the Promoting Adoption and Legal Guardianship for Children in Foster Care Act. Recorded October 22, 2013

Lloyd Alton Doggett II (born October 6, 1946) is an American lawyer and politician serving in the United States House of Representatives from Texas since 1995. A member of the Democratic Party, Doggett was a member of the Texas Senate from 1973 to 1985 and a justice of the Texas Supreme Court from 1989 to 1994. Doggett represents the same district President Lyndon B. Johnson once represented from 1937 until 1949.

He is the dean of Texas's congressional delegation; he previously shared the deanship with Sheila Jackson Lee until her death in 2024. Doggett was the first sitting Democratic congressperson after the CNN presidential debate to call on Joe Biden to drop out of the 2024 presidential race. On August 21, 2025, he announced that he would not run for re-election in 2026 if Texas's then-planned new congressional map was in effect for the 2026 elections.

== Early life and education ==
Doggett was born in Austin, Texas, the son of Alyce Paulin (Freydenfeldt) and Lloyd Alton Doggett. His maternal grandparents were Swedish. Doggett graduated Omicron Delta Kappa and received both a bachelor's degree in business administration and a Juris Doctor degree from the University of Texas at Austin, where he served as student body president his senior year. While attending the University of Texas at Austin, he also joined Lambda Chi Alpha fraternity.

== Early career ==
Doggett served as a member of the Texas Senate from 1973 to 1985. He gained attention in 1979 as a member of the "Killer Bees", a group of 12 Democratic state senators who opposed a plan to move the state's presidential primary to March 11. The intent was to give former Texas Governor John Connally a leg up on the 1980 Republican nomination. The Killer Bees wanted a closed primary. When this proposal was rejected, they walked out of the chamber and left the Senate two members short of a quorum. The bill was withdrawn five days later.

He was the Democratic nominee for the 1984 United States Senate election in Texas, losing to the Republican candidate, then-U.S. Representative Phil Gramm, by a wide margin. Doggett authored the bill creating the Texas Commission on Human Rights, as well as a law outlawing cop killer bullets and a sunset law requiring periodic review of government agencies.

In 1989, Doggett became both an Associate Justice of the Texas Supreme Court and an adjunct professor at the University of Texas School of Law.

== U.S. House of Representatives ==
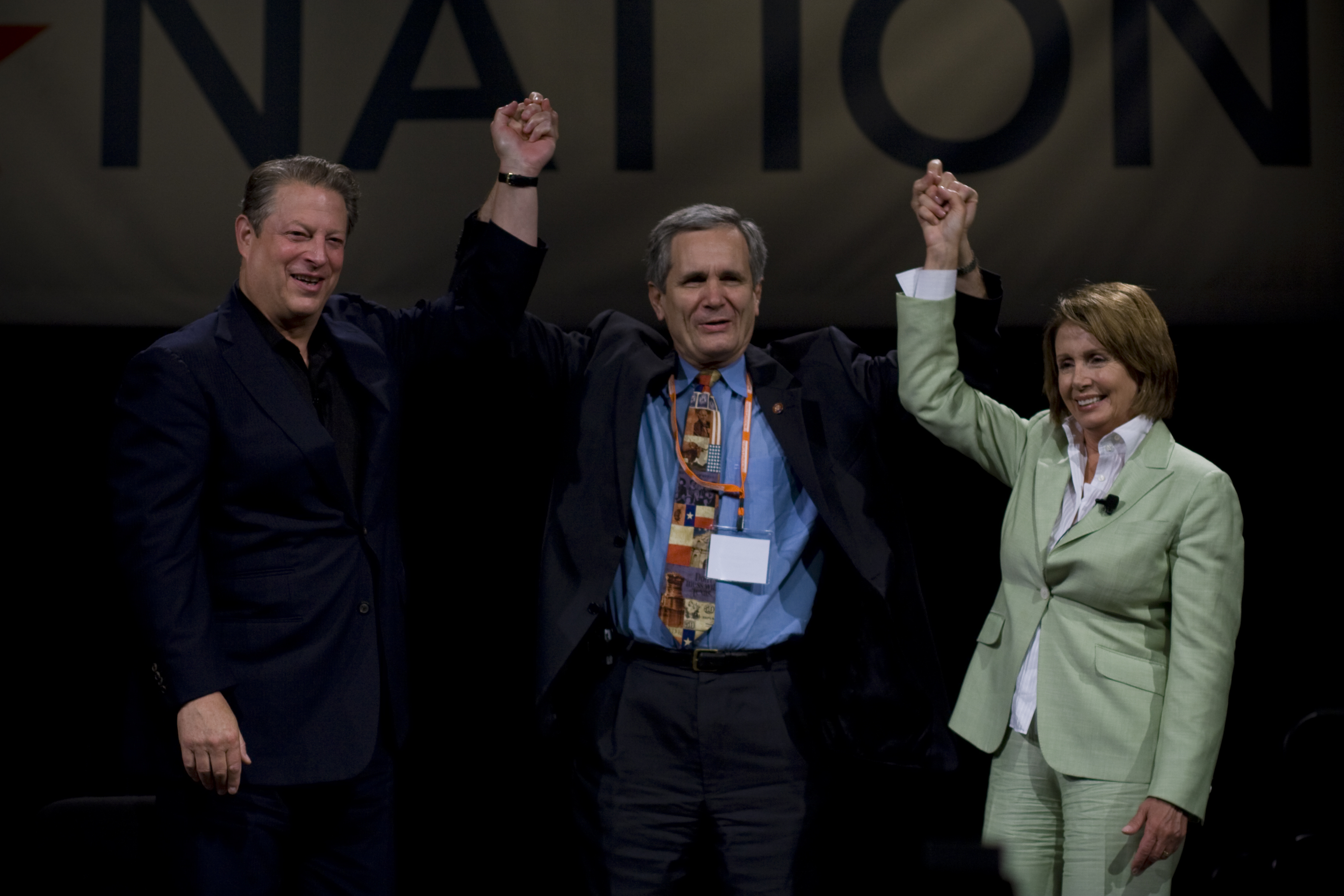
Doggett with Nancy Pelosi and Al Gore at Netroots Nation 2008

=== Elections ===
Before 2012

Doggett was elected to the House of Representatives in 1994 in what was then the 10th district after 32-year incumbent Jake Pickle retired. He was one of the few Democrats to win an open seat in that year's massive Republican landslide. Running for reelection in 1996, Doggett defeated Republican nominee Teresa Doggett, to whom he is no relation. It marked the second election in a row in which he defeated a black female Republican. In the years following his first reelection, Doggett consistently won around 85% of the vote, facing only Libertarian opponents. The 10th, which had once been represented by Lyndon Johnson, had long been a liberal Democratic bastion in increasingly Republican Texas.

Redistricting by the Texas Legislature in 2003 split Austin, which had been entirely or almost entirely in the 10th district for more than a century, into three districts. Through Republican gerrymandering, Doggett's home wound up in a new, heavily Republican 10th district stretching from north central Austin to the Houston suburbs. Most of his former territory wound up on the 25th district, which consisted of a long tendril stretching from Austin to McAllen on the Mexican border. It was called "the fajita strip" or "the bacon strip" because of its shape. Doggett moved to the newly configured 25th and entered the Democratic primary—the real contest in the heavily Democratic, majority-Hispanic district. He won the primary and the general election.

On June 28, 2006, the United States Supreme Court ruled that the nearby 23rd district's lines violated the rights of Latino voters. As part of the 2003 redistricting, heavily Democratic and majority-Latino Laredo had largely been cut out of the 23rd and replaced by several heavily Republican areas near San Antonio. The decision turned on the fact that the 23rd was a protected majority-Latino district—in other words, if the 23rd was ever redrawn to put Latinos in a minority, an acceptable majority-Latino district had to be created in its place. While the new 23rd was 55% Latino, only 46% of its voting population was Latino. The Court therefore found that the 23rd was not an acceptable Latino-majority district. It also found that the 25th was not compact enough to be an acceptable replacement because the two Latino communities in the district were more than 300 miles apart, creating the impression that it had been deliberately drawn to pick up as many Latinos as possible without regard to compactness.

Due to the 23rd's size, the ruling forced the redrawing of five districts between El Paso and San Antonio, including the 25th. For the 2006 election, Doggett regained most of his old base in Austin (though not the area around the University of Texas at Austin, which stayed in the 21st), and also picked up several suburbs southeast of the city. After skating to reelection in 2006 and 2008, he was held to only 52 percent of the vote in 2010—his closest race since 1996.

2012

It was reported that the new Congressional maps in Texas turned Doggett's district from a strongly Democratic district into a strongly Republican one. The new map split Doggett's old territory among five districts. His home was placed in a new, heavily Republican 25th district stretching from east Austin all the way to the fringes of Fort Worth. Much of his old base was placed in the newly created 35th district, a majority-Hispanic district stretching from San Antonio to eastern Austin. Doggett's home was approximately five blocks east of the 35th. It appeared that the Republican-controlled state legislature had gerrymandered the district by packing as many Democrats in the San Antonio-Austin corridor into it as possible.

Doggett accused the Republicans of wanting to make it difficult, if not impossible, for an Anglo Democrat to be elected to Congress from Texas, saying, "The Republican Party is determined to make the Democratic Party a party of minorities—that is what this is about, as well." He added that the Republicans were deliberately trying to reduce Austin's clout in Congress by "deny[ing] the capital city an opportunity to have a district that reflects the capital city." He was faced with the choice between running in the reconfigured 25th or moving, joking that he would live in a Winnebago to be able to run in the newly created 35th.

Doggett was set to face State Representative Joaquin Castro in the 35th district primary election. The race was described as the biggest threat to Doggett's survival yet, with Castro seen as a "rising star" in the Democratic party. Doggett accused Castro of working alongside Republicans throughout the redistricting process. The Republican House Redistricting Committee later said that any discussions with Castro took place after the area for the district was decided. Castro opted to run in the neighboring 20th district after its incumbent, Charlie Gonzalez, announced his retirement.

Doggett eventually decided to run in the 35th district, facing Bexar County assessor Sylvia Romo. Before the primary, he said that he would move into the district if he won. Political commentators suggested that Romo had the district numbers in her favor, but was attempting the difficult leap from local office to Congress, while Doggett had a huge amount of funding. Doggett stressed his long tenure as a progressive Democrat, saying he wanted to "stoutly defend Social Security, Medicare, and national health care", and also touted his strong support for higher education programs and public education. By contrast, Romo's campaign stressed her tax knowledge and CPA license, focusing on her potential to help with Congressional tax reform and economic growth.

Doggett won the primary with 73.2% of the vote. He performed strongly in San Antonio, an area he had never before represented. The district is so heavily Democratic that he was heavily favored to win the general election in November. He easily defeated Republican nominee, former San Marcos Mayor Susan Narvaiz, in the general election to become the first Anglo Democrat to represent a significant portion of San Antonio since Chick Kazen left office in 1985.

2016

Doggett won his 12th House term in 2016. With 124,612 votes (63.1%), he again defeated Narvaiz, who polled 62,384 (31.6%). Two other contenders held the remaining 5.4% of the vote.

2022

Texas's population growth resulted in its gaining two congressional seats after the 2020 census. In October 2021, Doggett announced he would run for reelection in the state's new 37th district rather than the 35th. Austin had been split between five districts on the previous congressional map, and Republican members of Congress who represented the area began facing closer reelection margins later in the decade due to the city's continued population growth and overwhelmingly Democratic voting patterns. Republican state legislators drew one of the new districts, the 37th, almost entirely within Travis County. They hoped to bolster Republican margins in surrounding districts by packing as many of Austin's Democrats into the 35th and 37th districts as possible. It closely resembles the area Doggett represented for his first five terms. Doggett's decision to run in the 37th district created a vacancy in the 35th, which runs along Interstate 35 from Austin to San Antonio. Both seats are overwhelmingly Democratic, and the winner of the Democratic primary in the 35th district, Greg Casar, was easily elected in the general election. Doggett won the 37th.

=== Tenure ===
Described as an "endangered species", Doggett was one of only three white male Democratic House members from Texas in the 113th Congress (the others being Gene Green and Beto O'Rourke) in a state with mostly Republicans and minority members of the Democratic Party. Since Green's and O'Rourke's retirements after the 2018 election, Doggett is the only white male Democrat representing Texas in Congress. He is one of the most liberal white Democrats from a Southern district, and one of the most liberal people ever to represent Texas in Congress. David Hawkings of Roll Call described his tax and environmental policies as "muscular progressivism".

Doggett was a frequent critic of former Speaker Newt Gingrich while allying with David Bonior, the Democratic whip, when Bonior was leading "an effort to diminish Gingrich's power by raising continual questions about his ethics." He has been a close ally of Nancy Pelosi. In 2002, he supported her successful bid for Democratic leader over fellow Texan Martin Frost, a more moderate candidate.

On the local level, Doggett helped ensure the development of the Austin Outpatient Clinic, which opened in 2011 as the largest veterans' clinic of its kind in the country. In 2014, he secured passage of legislation to expand the Missions National Park and supported it being named a UNESCO World Heritage Site.

Doggett has long supported more open government, and is also a leading advocate for campaign finance reform. On the Ways and Means Committee, he has sought to close many overseas tax shelters. Doggett has authored legislation to create tax incentives for plug-in hybrid electric vehicles and to create a nationwide Silver Alert system. From 2011 to 2016, he served as ranking member of the Human Resources Subcommittee and in 2017 became ranking member of the Tax Policy Subcommittee. His priorities there included education, health care, preventing child abuse, reducing prescription drug prices, fighting poverty, and eliminating multinational tax shelters and loopholes.

On July 2, 2024, Doggett became the first sitting Democrat in Congress to openly call for President Joe Biden to withdraw from the 2024 United States presidential election after the first presidential debate, in which many perceived Biden performed poorly in, causing many Democrats to start being concerned about Biden's age and cognitive ability. Before Doggett took this political risk he spoke with former House Speaker Nancy Pelosi of California and Democratic leader Hakeem Jeffries. He also huddled with Representative Steny Hoyer of Maryland and spoke with Representative Jim Clyburn of South Carolina, a close ally of Biden's, and "with every other (House) member I could find." Doggett's message was clear: "We must have another candidate." Democrats had become doubtful of Biden's ability to defeat former President Donald Trump in the general election.

After Trump's victory in the 2024 U.S. presidential election, regarding not calling on Biden to call it quits sooner, Doggett said, "I only regret I didn't do it earlier. I think it's unfortunate that he took three weeks to decide. I believe that the only person in our caucus who doesn't share some responsibility for the outcome is Dean Phillips, who came out early. I accept responsibility as well that there's more that we could have done."

In spite of calling for President Biden to step down due to age concerns, Representative Doggett himself declared his candidacy for his own re-election bid just months later. He will be 80 years old when the 2026 midterm elections take place. Ongoing efforts by the Texas State Legislature to gerrymander the state's congressional districts has raised speculation that he and fellow Democrat Greg Casar could be placed in the same district. In July 2025, Doggett reaffirmed his intent to seek re-election even if he were to challenge the 35-year old Casar, stating that "We do need young leaders, but we don't need everyone on our team to play the same position." However, on August 21, 2025, Doggett announced he would not seek reelection in Texas' 37th congressional district if Republican-backed redistricting maps are upheld, avoiding a potential primary against Representative Greg Casar.

=== Political positions ===
==== Abortion ====
Doggett supports legalization of abortion. In 2003, he voted against a bill that would have banned all late-term procedures called partial-birth abortions. He was given a 100% by the NARAL. He voted in favor of a bill to provide federal funding for embryonic stem cell research in 2007.

==== Environment ====
Doggett supports environmental preservation. He is one of the leading opponents in the House of drilling for oil in the Arctic National Wildlife Reserve in Alaska. The League of Conservation Voters gave Doggett a 100% rating, an indication that he supports the group's interpretation of environmental preservation. In the 110th Congress (2007–08), he wrote climate change legislation that would have gone further to reduce greenhouse gases than bills his party's leaders supported.

In June 2009, Doggett voted for the American Clean Energy and Security Act, a bill that would have established an emissions trading system for American producers of carbon dioxide. He said, "It has been a difficult and significant decision". "I just decided that I will have a better chance to make changes later in the process if I acted in good faith now. But don't think this means I'm signing off on the conference report", he added.

In 2018, Doggett was rated 100% by the group Clean Water Action.

==== Gay rights ====
Doggett voted against the Federal Marriage Amendment in the 109th Congress. He voted against HR 4380 and HR 2587, bills that would have banned adoption by same-sex couples. In 1996, Doggett voted for the Defense of Marriage Act (DOMA), but in 2011 he co-sponsored the Respect for Marriage Act, which would repeal DOMA.

==== Taxes ====
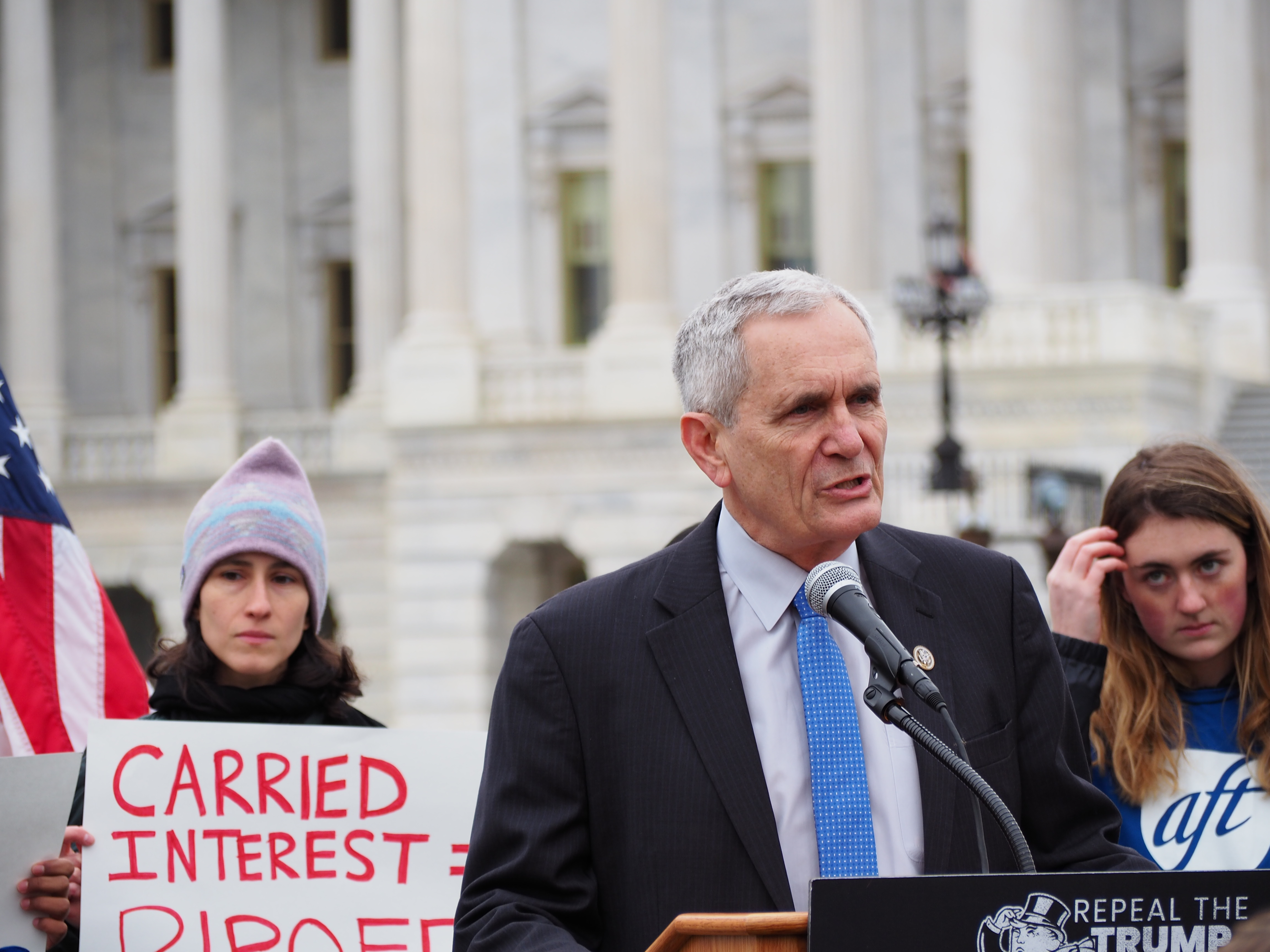
Doggett speaking at the 2018 Tax March.

Doggett introduced legislation that would restrict American companies from using overseas strategies to reduce their corporate tax rates. When Obama unveiled his plan in May 2009 to significantly change how U.S.-based multinationals are taxed, it included aspects of Doggett's proposals to crack down on tax dodgers. He voted against the 2010 tax compromise, criticizing the renewal of the Bush tax cuts, saying "This bill is largely a mishmash of rejected Republican ideas that cost too much to accomplish too little." He led a group of Democrats who "criticized the inclusion of a Social Security payroll tax reduction, saying it would endanger the soundness of the program."

In 2010, Doggett was responsible for an amendment to an education jobs bill that would mandate that Texas keep the same amount of education funding for three years in order to receive $832 million in federal money. Rick Perry called it "an unconstitutional anti-Texas amendment" and later filed a lawsuit after the Department of Education declined the application for funds.

In 2015, Doggett introduced legislation to close a loophole that allows tax writeoffs for senior executive bonuses, calling it "a perverse incentive for companies: the more you pay your executives, the less you'll pay in taxes."

==== Energy ====
Doggett has backed bills to reduce greenhouse gas emissions and supports cap-and-trade as well as clean technologies. He supported the 2009 climate-change bill, "despite claiming it didn't do enough to protect the environment." He said it stripped the EPA of too much power and was too beneficial to coal plants and "other polluters." Doggett supports auctioning carbon allowances, and has worked to make legislation usually associated with the House Ways and Means Committee to be associated with the Energy and Commerce Committee.

In June 2015, Doggett voted against fast-track Trade Promotion Authority, calling it a "charter for corporate America rather than a high-level trade agreement." He criticized the U.S. Trade Representative for failing to enforce labor and environmental standards. "Usually, the reason that USTR fails is that it doesn't really try," he said. 'Asleep at the Wheel' is a great Texas swing band, but it is a horrible philosophy for trade law enforcement."

In 2015, Doggett's continued interest in international affairs was reflected in his support for the Joint Comprehensive Plan of Action (JCPOA), the Iran nuclear deal. Together with Representatives David Price and Jan Schakowsky, Doggett organized a successful whip effort to ensure Congress did not obstruct nuclear negotiations with Iran.

==== Health care ====
In March 2010, Doggett voted for the Patient Protection and Affordable Care Act. Before his vote, he cited concerns that the bill did not include enough affordability, insurance competition provisions, and consumer protection provisions. Originally an advocate of a public option, he conceded the option in the final vote.

In 2015, Congress passed Doggett's NOTICE Act, which ensures that hospitalized seniors are notified whether they are in outpatient observation or inpatient care, saving them the sticker shock from realizing Medicare may not cover their skilled nursing facility care as expected. Doggett sponsored the Medicare Identity Theft Prevention Act, which was enacted in 2015 and protects seniors from identity theft by removing Social Security numbers from Medicare cards. Another of Doggett's sponsored bills, the Ensuring Access to Clinical Trials Act, was enacted that same year. It allows patients with rare diseases to receive some compensation for clinical trial participation, without that compensation counting toward income eligibility limits for Social Security income or Medicaid.

Doggett has said Republicans in Congress and "ideological groups that have never accepted the idea of social insurance" pose a greater threat to Social Security than the country's aging population.

Doggett founded the House Prescription Drug Task Force to tackle the cost of prescription drugs.

Doggett co-sponsored the Medicare for All Act of 2019.

==== Criticism of healthcare opponents ====
In August 2009, a "rally" against Obamacare broke out after Doggett said that he would support it even if his constituents opposed it. The protesters, who chanted "just say no", were later criticized by Doggett, who called them a "mob" and "extremists", and said the group was part of the "party of no." Of the situation, he said: "Their fanatical insistence on repealing Social Security and Medicare is not just about halting health care reform but rolling back 75 years of progress." Doggett said he was committed to individual choices.

Doggett reportedly tried to answer questions, but felt the demonstrators opposed all government programs, including Social Security and Medicare, in addition to the health care plan. He said that "[i]n Texas, not only with the weather but with the politics, it is pretty hardball around here ... I have a pretty thick skin about all of this. But this really goes over the line.'"

==== Immigration ====
Doggett supports a guest worker program for undocumented immigrants. In 2004, he voted against a bill that would have required hospitals to report undocumented immigrants who received hospital treatment to the Department of Justice. The Federation for American Immigration Reform (FAIR), an anti-immigration organization classified by the Southern Poverty Law Center as a hate group, gave Doggett a score of 0% – indicating the percentage of times he voted in favor of FAIR's positions – in 2003.

Doggett also supports the Deferred Action for Childhood Arrivals (DACA) program, which grants undocumented immigrants brought to the U.S. at a young age, known as "Dreamers", access to work permits and deportation relief.

==== Iraq ====
Doggett was one of the leading opponents of the authorization of the Iraq War in 2003 and called for a timetable for U.S. troops pulling out of Iraq. On May 24, 2007, he was one of 140 Democrats and two Republicans to vote against HR 2206, a bill that would provide emergency supplemental appropriations for funding the war, and in 2009 he was one of only 30 representatives to vote against HR 2346, which provided funding to continue war.

==== Education ====
In 2009, as part of the Obama administration's American Recovery and Reinvestment Act, Doggett authored the American Opportunity Tax Credit, which provides a refundable credit for some tuition and related expenses.

==== Other social service issues ====
In January 2013, Doggett passed a bill into law setting up a national commission to examine ways to reduce the number of children who die of abuse and neglect. More children die in Texas of abuse and neglect than in any other state. The tax and spending deal approved that month to avoid a so-called "fiscal cliff" included an extension of a higher-education tax credit he had proposed. He also worked with Representative Sam Johnson to pass a bill through the House in December 2012 to authorize the phased removal of Social Security numbers from Medicare cards to crack down on identity theft.

==== Trump administration ====
Doggett was a vocal critic of President Donald Trump, skipping his inauguration to speak at the Women's March at the State Capitol in Austin, which observers described as the largest protest in Texas history. He has played a leading role in seeking disclosure of Trump's tax returns and in opposing the repeal of the Affordable Health Care Act. Doggett also sponsored a resolution to formally censure Trump for his failure regarding violence at Charlottesville, Virginia.

==== Syria ====
In 2023, Doggett was among 56 Democrats to vote in favor of H.Con.Res. 21 which directed President Joe Biden to remove U.S. troops from Syria within 180 days.

==== Israel ====
Doggett voted to provide Israel with financial support in the Gaza war. He has since criticized Israel and U.S. policy for failing to protect civilians in Gaza.

=== Committee assignments ===
- Committee on Ways and Means
  - Subcommittee on Health (chair)
  - Select Revenue Measures Subcommittee
- Joint Committee on Taxation
- House Budget Committee

=== Caucus memberships ===
- Congressional Asian Pacific American Caucus
- House Songwriters Caucus (co-chair)
- Congressional Pediatric and Adult Hydrocephalus Caucus(co-chair)
- United States Congressional International Conservation Caucus
- Congressional Arts Caucus
- Congressional Equality Caucus
- Safe Climate Caucus
- Congressional Progressive Caucus
- House Baltic Caucus
- Afterschool Caucuses
- Congressional NextGen 9-1-1 Caucus
- Congressional Coalition on Adoption Caucus
- Congressional Caucus for the Equal Rights Amendment
- Congressional Ukraine Caucus
- Congressional Wildlife Refuge Caucus
- Rare Disease Caucus
- Congressional Caucus on Turkey and Turkish Americans
- Congressional Freethought Caucus

== Electoral history ==
Texas's 10th congressional district: Results 1994–2002
| Year | Subject | Party | Votes | % | Opponent | Party | Votes | % | Opponent | Party | Votes | % | Opponent | Party | Votes | % | Opponent | Party | Votes | % |
|---|---|---|---|---|---|---|---|---|---|---|---|---|---|---|---|---|---|---|---|---|
| 1994 | Lloyd Doggett | Democratic | 113,738 | 56.31 | Jo Baylor | Republican | 80,382 | 39.22 | Jeff Hill | Libertarian | 2,953 | 1.46 | Michael L. Brandes | Independent | 2,579 | 1.28 | Jeff Davis | Independent | 2,334 | 1.16 |
| 1996 | Lloyd Doggett | Democratic | 132,066 | 56.20 | Teresa Doggett | Republican | 97,204 | 41.36 | Gary Johnson | Libertarian | 3,950 | 1.68 | Steve Klayman | Natural Law | 1,771 | 0.75 | | | | |
| 1998 | Lloyd Doggett | Democratic | 116,127 | 85.21 | Vincent J. May | Libertarian | 20,155 | 14.79 | | | | | | | | | | | | |
| 2000 | Lloyd Doggett | Democratic | 203,628 | 84.55 | Michael Davis | Libertarian | 37,203 | 15.45 | | | | | | | | | | | | |
| 2002 | Lloyd Doggett | Democratic | 114,428 | 84.37 | Michele Messina | Libertarian | 21,196 | 15.63 | | | | | | | | | | | | |

Texas's 25th congressional district: Results 2004–2010
| Year | Subject | Party | Votes | % | Opponent | Party | Votes | % | Opponent | Party | Votes | % | Opponent | Party | Votes | % |
|---|---|---|---|---|---|---|---|---|---|---|---|---|---|---|---|---|
| 2004 | Lloyd Doggett | Democratic | 108,309 | 67.60 | Rebecca Klein | Republican | 49,252 | 30.74 | James Werner | Libertarian | 2,656 | 1.66 | | | | |
| 2006 | Lloyd Doggett | Democratic | 109,839 | 67.25 | Grant Rostig | Republican | 42,956 | 26.30 | Barbara Cunningham | Libertarian | 6,933 | 4.25 | Brian Parrett | Independent | 3,594 | 2.20 |
| 2008 | Lloyd Doggett | Democratic | 191,755 | 65.82 | George Morovich | Republican | 88,693 | 30.44 | Jim Stutsman | Libertarian | 10,848 | 3.72 | | | | |
| 2010 | Lloyd Doggett | Democratic | 99,967 | 52.82 | Donna Campbell | Republican | 84,849 | 44.83 | Jim Stutsman | Libertarian | 4,431 | 2.34 | | | | |

Texas's 35th congressional district: Results 2012–2020
| Year | Subject | Party | Votes | % | Opponent | Party | Votes | % | Opponent | Party | Votes | % | Opponent | Party | Votes | % |
|---|---|---|---|---|---|---|---|---|---|---|---|---|---|---|---|---|
| 2012 | Lloyd Doggett | Democratic | 105,626 | 63.96 | Susan Narvaiz | Republican | 52,894 | 32.03 | Ross Lynn Leone | Libertarian | 4,082 | 2.47 | Meghan Owen | Green | 2,540 | 1.54 |
| 2014 | Lloyd Doggett | Democratic | 60,124 | 62.48 | Susan Narvaiz | Republican | 32,040 | 33.30 | Cory W. Bruner | Libertarian | 2,767 | 2.88 | Kat Swift | Green | 1,294 | 1.34 |
| 2016 | Lloyd Doggett | Democratic | 124,612 | 63.07 | Susan Narvaiz | Republican | 62,384 | 31.57 | Rhett Rosenquest Smith | Libertarian | 6,504 | 3.29 | Scott Trimble | Green | 4,076 | 2.06 |
| 2018 | Lloyd Doggett | Democratic | 138,278 | 71.03 | David Smalling | Republican | 50,553 | 26.0 | Clark Patterson | Libertarian | 5,236 | 2.07 | | | | |
| 2020 | Lloyd Doggett | Democratic | 176,373 | 65.37 | Jenny Garcia Sharon | Republican | 80,795 | 29.95 | Mark Loewe | Libertarian | 7,393 | 2.74 | Jason Mata, Sr. | Independent | 5,236 | 1.94 |

Texas's 37th congressional district: Results 2022–
| Year | Subject | Party | Votes | % | Opponent | Party | Votes | % | Opponent | Party | Votes | % | Opponent | Party | Votes | % |
|---|---|---|---|---|---|---|---|---|---|---|---|---|---|---|---|---|
| 2022 | Lloyd Doggett | Democratic | 219,358 | 76.76 | Jenny Garcia Sharon | Republican | 59,923 | 20.97 | Clark Patterson | Libertarian | 6,332 | 2.22 | | | | |
| 2024 | Lloyd Doggett | Democratic | 252,980 | 74.22 | Jenny Garcia Sharon | Republican | 59,923 | 23.58 | Girish Alketar | Libertarian | 6,332 | 2.20 | | | | |

== Personal life ==
Doggett is married to Libby Doggett (née Belk), with whom he has two children.

The Sunlight Project estimates his average net worth in 2006 was over $13 million. In 2008, the Sunlight Foundation reported that of the 435 House members, Doggett has the 11th-highest amount of investment in oil stocks.

Doggett is a United Methodist.

Party political offices
| Preceded by Bob Krueger | Democratic nominee for U.S. Senator from Texas (Class 2); 1984 | Succeeded by Hugh Parmer |
Legal offices
| Preceded by Ted Robertson | Justice of the Texas Supreme Court; 1989–1994 | Succeeded by Priscilla Owen |
U.S. House of Representatives
| Preceded by J. J. Pickle | Member of the U.S. House of Representatives from Texas's 10th congressional district 1995–2005 | Succeeded by Michael McCaul |
| Preceded by Chris Bell | Member of the U.S. House of Representatives from Texas's 25th congressional district 2005–2013 | Succeeded by Roger Williams |
| New constituency | Member of the U.S. House of Representatives from Texas's 35th congressional district 2013–2023 | Succeeded by Greg Casar |
| New constituency | Member of the U.S. House of Representatives from Texas's 37th congressional district 2023–present | Incumbent |
U.S. order of precedence (ceremonial)
| Preceded by Frank Lucas | United States representatives by seniority 18th | Succeeded by Zoe Lofgren |
| Preceded by Frank Lucas | Order of precedence of the United States | Succeeded by Zoe Lofgren |
