= Nelson Phillips =

American lawyer and judge (1873–1939)

Nelson Phillips (May 3, 1873 – March 31, 1939) was an American lawyer and judge who served as justice of the Texas Supreme Court from April 1912 to November 1921, serving as chief justice from June 1915 to November 1921.

== Biography ==
Phillips was born on May 3, 1873, in Jefferson, Texas, to Edward—a Confederate veteran in the American Civil War— andJennie L. Phillips (née Arrington). The family moved to Hillsboro, Texas, where Phillips "attended local schools until the age of fifteen" before spending two years at Bingham Military School in Mebane, North Carolina. Employed at his father's bank, he read law nightly in the office of Thomas S. Smith in 1893, stopping in 1894 when he was admitted to the bar.

In 1904, Governor S. W. T. Lanham gave Phillips a two-year appointment to a seat on the Eighteenth Judicial District of Texas. After its expiration, Phillips moved to Dallas to practice law. He later served on the University of Texas board of regents. He married Susie McFadden on October 1, 1896, having one child together.

In 1911, Governor Oscar Branch Colquitt appointed Phillips to a seat on the Texas Supreme Court vacated by the resignation of William F. Ramsey. Phillips served as an associate justice from April 3, 1912, to November 1921, and then served as chief justice from June 1915 until his resignation in November 1921. Phillips then returned to private practice in Dallas until his death on March 31, 1939, aged 65, of heart disease. He was interred at the Sparkman-Hillcrest Memorial Park Cemetery.

Political offices
Preceded by William F. Ramsey	Justice of the Texas Supreme Court; 1912–1915	Succeeded by James E. Yantis
Preceded by Thomas J. Brown	Chief Justice of the Texas Supreme Court; 1915–1921	Succeeded by Calvin Maples Cureton
