= Reuben R. Gaines =

American judge (1836–1914)

Justice of the Supreme Court of Texas
- In office November 1886 – January 1911
- Preceded by: Sawnie Robertson
- Succeeded by: Leroy G. Denman

Chief Justice of the Supreme Court of Texas
- In office 1894 – January 5, 1911
- Preceded by: John W. Stayton
- Succeeded by: Thomas Jefferson Brown

Personal details
- Born: Reuben Reid Gaines; October 30, 1836 Sumter County, Alabama, US
- Died: October 13, 1914 (aged 77) Austin, Texas, US
- Education: University of Alabama; College of William & Mary; Cumberland University
- Occupation: Lawyer, judge

Military service
- Branch/service: Confederate States Army
- Battles/wars: American Civil War

Reuben Reid Gaines (October 30, 1836 – October 13, 1914) was a lawyer and judge who served as justice of the Supreme Court of Texas from November 1886 to January 1911. He served as the court's chief justice from 1894 until his retirement in 1911.

== Early life and education ==
Gaines was born on October 30, 1836, in Sumter County, Alabama, to Joab—a slaveowner—and Lucinda Gaines (née McDavid). Of an educated father, he himself studied law at the University of Alabama, graduating in 1855 with a Bachelor's, as well as attending the College of William & Mary and Cumberland University, graduating from the latter in 1857. He married Louisa Shortridge on March 30, 1859, having one child together. During the American Civil War, he served under Joseph E. Johnston and surrendered in May 1865.

== Legal career ==
Having practiced law in Alabama from 1858 to 1861, Gaines and his wife moved to Clarksville, Texas. There, he became an active Democrat and practiced law with Benjamin H. Epperson. He served as judge of the Sixth Judicial District of Texas from 1876 until his resignation in 1884.

He was appointed to the Supreme Court of Texas by John Ireland in November 1886—following a disputed election against Andrew Jackson Harris, and was then re-elected in 1888 and 1894. Succeeding John W. Stayton as Chief Justice in 1894 when appointed by Jim Hogg, he was re-elected as Chief Justice in 1900 and 1906, serving until his retirement January 5, 1911. He was known for his avoiding biases, and was said to speak for nobody, including himself.

After retiring, he moved into the Driskill Hotel in Austin, dying there on August 13, 1914, aged 77, of a stroke.

Political offices
Preceded by Sawnie Robertson	Justice of the Texas Supreme Court; 1886–1911	Succeeded by Leroy G. Denman
Preceded by John W. Stayton	Chief Justice of the Texas Supreme Court; 1894–1911	Succeeded by Thomas J. Brown
