= Calvin Maples Cureton =

American judge (1874–1940)

Calvin Maples Cureton (September 1, 1874 – April 8, 1940) was the chief justice of the Texas Supreme Court from 1921 to 1940.

== Biography ==
Born on September 1, 1874, near Walnut Springs, Texas, Cureton's father was a rancher and his grandfather was a pioneer soldier. His grandfather was a soldier and eponymous to Camp Cureton. After the death of his mother when he was five years old, Cureton was raised by his father and grandparents. He studied at the University of Virginia from 1892 to 1893, but a faltering economy forced his return to Texas, where he read law to gain admission to the bar in 1897.

He served in the Texas voluntary infantry during the Spanish–American War in 1898, and served in the Texas Legislature from 1909 to 1912, and as Texas Attorney General from 1918 to 1921. His service in that office ended when Governor Pat Morris Neff appointed Cureton to the position of Chief Justice of the Texas Supreme Court, the seat having been vacated by the resignation of Nelson Phillips. Cureton was re-elected to the position four times, the fourth time without opposition.

At the time of his death, he was the longest-serving Chief Justice in the history of the court.

He died on April 8, 1940, aged 65, from chronic heart disease.

Party political offices
Preceded by B. F. Looney	Democratic nominee for Texas Attorney General; 1920	Succeeded by Walter Angus Keeling
Political offices
Preceded by B. F. Looney	Attorney General of Texas; 1918–1921	Succeeded by Walter Angus Keeling
Preceded by Nelson Phillips	Justice of the Texas Supreme Court; 1921–1940	Succeeded by W. F. Moore
