= Ted Z. Robertson =

American judge

Theodore Zanderson Robertson (September 28, 1921 – October 13, 2017) was a justice of the Supreme Court of Texas from December 2, 1982 to December 31, 1988.

Roberson was born in San Antonio, Texas and went to the San Antonio public schools. He received his bachelor's degree from Texas A&M University. He served in the United States Coast Guard during World War II. In 1949, Robertson received his law degree from St. Mary's University School of Law and was admitted to the Texas bar. He practiced law in San Antonio, Texas and Dallas, Texas. In 1960, he served in the Dallas County, Texas District Attorney office. In 1965, Robertson was appointed to the Dallas County Probate Court. He was appointed to the Dallas County District Court in 1975 and the Dallas Court of Appeals in 1976. Robertson served on the Texas Supreme Court from 1982 to 1988. Robertson died at his home in Dallas, Texas, at the age of 96.

Political offices
Preceded by Jack Pope	Justice of the Texas Supreme Court; 1982–1988	Succeeded by Lloyd Doggett
