= Jack Pope =

American judge (1913–2017)

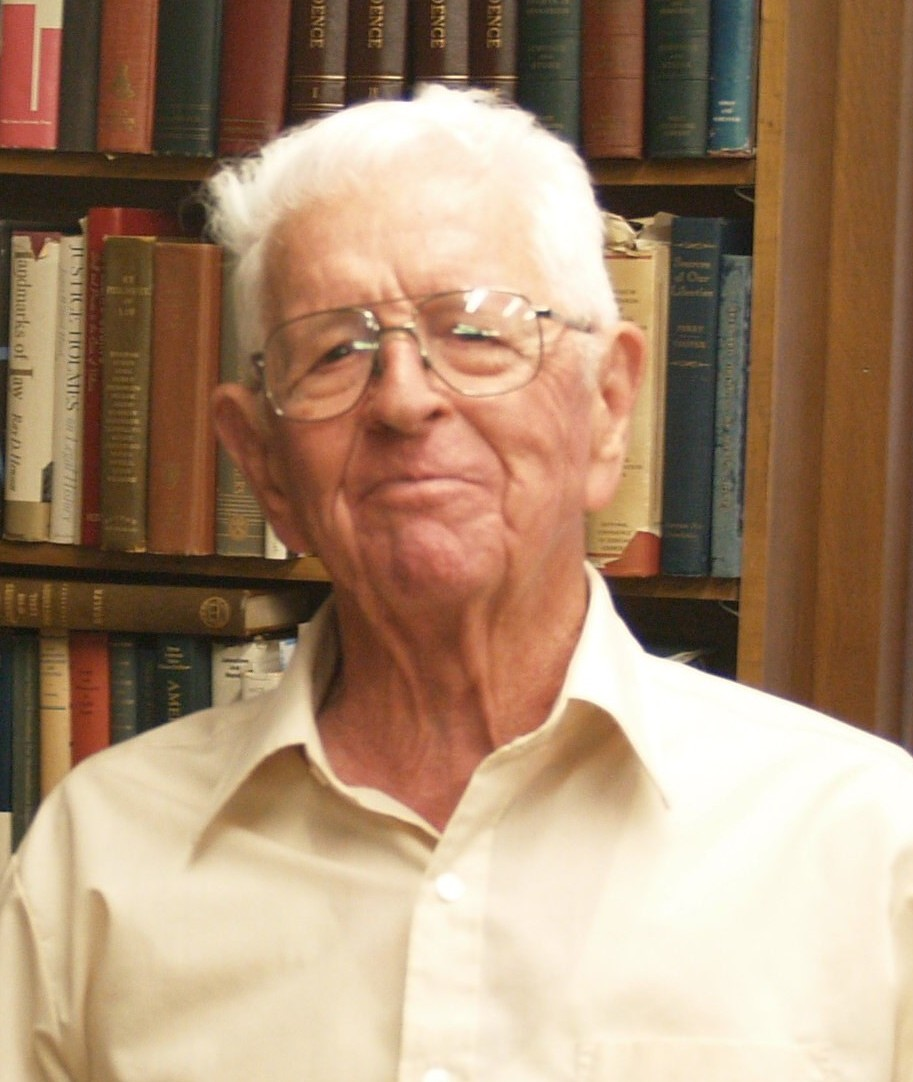
- Retired Texas Chief Justice Jack Pope, aged 97, in his home library, March 2011

Chief Justice of the Supreme Court of Texas
- In office November 29, 1982 – January 4, 1985
- Preceded by: Joe R. Greenhill
- Succeeded by: John Hill

Justice of the Supreme Court of Texas
- In office January 4, 1965 – November 29, 1982
- Preceded by: Frank P. Culver Jr.
- Succeeded by: Ted Z. Robertson

4th Court of Civil Appeals, Justice
- In office September 12, 1951 – 1964

94th District Court, District Judge
- In office December 16, 1946 – 1951

Personal details
- Born: Andrew Jackson Pope Jr. April 18, 1913 Abilene, Texas, U.S.
- Died: February 25, 2017 (aged 103) Austin, Texas, U.S.
- Resting place: Texas State Cemetery
- Party: Democratic
- Spouse: Allene Nichols (m. 1938; died 2004)
- Children: 2
- Education: Abilene Christian University (BA); University of Texas at Austin (LLB)
- Profession: Lawyer

Military service
- Allegiance: United States
- Branch/service: United States Navy; United States Naval Reserve
- Years of service: 1944–1946
- Battles/wars: World War II

Andrew Jackson Pope Jr., known as Jack Pope (April 18, 1913 – February 25, 2017), was an American judge, attorney, author and legal scholar who served as chief justice of the Supreme Court of Texas.

Pope previously held the record for the longest sitting justice in Texas Supreme Court history before current Chief Justice Nathan Hecht surpassed him. Altogether, Pope served on the bench for 38 years, including the District Court, Court of Appeals, and Supreme Court. At the time of his 100th birthday, he was the oldest living former Chief Justice of any supreme court in the United States, as well as the longest living chief justice of any supreme court of any state in United States history.

== Early life ==
Pope was born in Abilene, Texas to Dr. Andrew Jackson Pope Sr., a physician, and Ruth Adelia Taylor, a native of Nebraska. He is a descendant of Andrew Jackson Berry, who fought at the Battle of San Jacinto in the Texas Revolution. After completing high school in Abilene in 1930, he earned a Bachelor of Arts degree from Abilene Christian College (now Abilene Christian University) in 1934, where he had served as Students' Association President. Pope then served as a student editor of the Texas Law Review at the University of Texas School of Law, graduating with a Bachelor of Laws degree and in 1937 was licensed by the bar. In 1938, he married Allene Nichols, an elementary school teacher and graduate of the University of Texas whom he met while attending law school; the couple had two sons.

== Career ==
=== Early legal career ===
After obtaining his license to practice law in Texas in 1937, Pope "joined his uncle, former state representative Walter E. Pope," at his law firm in Corpus Christi. His practice consisted of both civil and criminal matters, such as creditors' rights, oil and gas, personal injury, and family law.

He went on to manage his uncle's business, the Highway Transportation Company, a passenger "bus line which operated between Houston, Corpus Christi, and San Antonio." During this time, he was engaged in the legal interpretation of the new transportation regulatory laws, as well as New Deal labor laws.

When the United States entered World War II, Pope joined the Naval Reserve in 1944. He served on the legal staff of the Naval Air Training Station in Corpus Christi, as well as on stations in Washington, D.C. and San Diego, until his discharge in 1946.

=== Judge and legal scholar ===
==== District Judge ====
In late 1946 Pope was appointed by Democratic Governor Coke R. Stevenson to fill the unexpired term of Judge Allen Wood of the 94th District Court. Governor Stevenson's successor, Beauford H. Jester, then appointed Pope to Judge Wood's four-year term, which began January 1, 1947.

He became Texas' youngest district judge at the time when he sat on the bench at 33 years of age. During his time on the district court bench, Pope began writing for and lecturing at legal institutes and before bar associations across South Texas. His concerns included legal ethics, trial administration, best practices for presenting and excluding evidence, and the Texas jury system. On several occasions he was appointed to other regional courts to assist when another judge was recused from presiding.

==== Court of Appeals Justice ====
In 1950 the Nueces County Bar Association prepared a resolution urging him to campaign for the 4th Court of Civil Appeals in San Antonio. Since 1892, of the fifteen judges who had served on that court, all but five had come from San Antonio. The legal community of Nueces County and the Rio Grande Valley counties hoped to change that trend by nominating and actively campaigning for the young judge., After winning the primary in July, Pope was appointed to the 4th Court of Appeals' bench by Governor Allan Shivers to replace Justice Lorenz Broeter, who had resigned. Pope sat on the court until 1950, whereupon he began serving his own six-year term, with voters subsequently re-electing him to an additional two terms, for a total of 14 years., In 1961 Pope's judicial review of water rights derived from Spanish and Mexican land grants in the case State v. Valmont Plantations set a legal precedent which would thereafter set the standard for the adjudication of Texas water law.

==== Supreme Court Justice ====
In December 1963, Pope declared his intention to run for a vacancy position on the Texas Supreme Court, after receiving 80 petitions from 55 Texas counties with over 2,000 signatures of attorneys pledging their support, and in 1964 he was elected an associate justice. During his tenure as an associate justice, he spearheaded an initiative with the State Bar of Texas to institute a program for continuing statewide judicial education, and to develop judicial ethics rules. His efforts resulted in both compulsory continuing judicial education and the Court's adoption of The Texas Code of Judicial Conduct in 1974. He was also directly involved in the creation of the Texas State Law Library in 1971, and served on the Friends of the State Law Library Board of Directors.

==== Supreme Court Chief Justice ====
When Joe R. Greenhill resigned as chief justice in October 1982, Governor William P. Clements appointed Pope to succeed Greenhill. As a Republican, Clements had crossed party lines to appoint Pope, a lifelong Democrat. However, when Democrat Mark White was elected governor that November, a group of 14 Democratic legislators in the Texas Senate publicly stated that they would "bust" all lame-duck appointments by the outgoing Republican governor regardless of qualifications. The Democratic senators attempted to negotiate terms to keep true to their statement of blocking all of the Republican's appointments, while also preserving the power of the Chief Justice position for the Democratic party. However, Pope refused to promise a retirement or interim-only judgeship, saying: "The citizens of Texas do not want their Chief Justice, or any judge, to make a deal to get a job. If he'll make a deal to get a job, he may keep on making deals to keep that job." At a news conference in early 1983, Governor White stated that he did not oppose Pope's confirmation; and in February the Senate voted 29–2 in approval.

After federal cuts to legal-assistance financing in the early 1980s, as Chief Justice he advocated a way for Texas to guarantee income to finance legal assistance for the poor by using pooled trust-account interest. This program, known as Interest on Lawyer Trust Accounts (IOLTA), is now used in every U.S. state.

== Later life and death ==
Upon his 1985 retirement Pope had written over 700 opinions for the Supreme Court, with an additional 500 opinions as a district judge and court of appeals justice. Although he had served as a judge for over 38 years, 21 of those years on the Texas Supreme Court, nearing the Court's mandatory retirement age in 1985 Chief Justice Pope wryly commented: "Just about the time I was getting the hang of being a judge, I had to retire."

In 1989 Abilene Christian University established the Jack Pope Fellows Program "to offer scholarships to ACU students pursuing public service careers." The interdisciplinary program gives students with "good minds and character" public service educational opportunities in and out of the classroom. Also in 1989, Pope co-founded the non-profit Texas Center for Legal Ethics with other former Chief Justices Joe R. Greenhill and Robert W. Calvert. Its mission is to promote the values contained in the Texas Lawyers’ Creed of Professionalism.

In 2011, at age ninety-eight, he wrote a memoir called My Little United Nations: A Team Approach to Growing Older and Wiser and Having Fun Along the Way— an account of staying physically and emotionally healthy, despite increasing age and the death of his wife in 2004, with the help of a diverse team of caregivers from around the world.

On May 28, 2013, Governor Rick Perry signed into law House Bill 1445, which raised the limit on civil penalties and restitution collected by the Attorney General's Office eligible for supporting legal assistance for the indigent to $50 million per year. The Legislature called the law the Chief Justice Jack Pope Act, in honor of his earlier work championing the IOLTA program which provides legal assistance for the poor. The Act came as a response to shrinking returns under that program.

Pope died on 25 February 2017 at the age of 103. He was survived by his two sons, three grandchildren and six great-grandchildren.

By the time of his retirement in 1985, Pope had written more than a thousand legal opinions. Upon Pope's passing, Texas Chief Justice Nathan Hecht, a Republican, called him "a judicial icon. His hard work, scholarship, common sense, humor, and integrity are legendary. No Texas judge has ever been more committed to serving the rule of law and the cause of justice. He was my mentor, role model, counselor, and most especially my friend. Texas has lost a great, great man."

== Awards ==
In 2009 he received the TCLE's inaugural Chief Justice Jack Pope Professionalism Award, "presented annually to both an appellate judge and an appellate lawyer who 'epitomize the highest level of professionalism and integrity.'" On September 22, 2010, the judicial section of the State Bar of Texas presented him with its inaugural Judicial Lifetime Achievement Award at its Annual Judicial Conference in Corpus Christi. On April 18, 2013 Pope was honored with a ceremony recognizing his 100th birthday in the Texas House of Representatives within the Texas State Capitol. The House passed a resolution in his honor and "heard words of praise from four U.S. presidents, as well as the nine U.S. Supreme Court justices."
