= Reuben A. Reeves =

American judge (1821–1908)

Reuben A. Reeves (August 9, 1821 – January 30, 1908) was a justice of the Supreme Court of Texas from November 1864 to June 1866, and again from January 1874 to April 1876.

In 1885, President Grover Cleveland appointed Reeves to the territorial New Mexico Supreme Court, where Reeves served until 1889.

Political offices
| Preceded by James H. Bell | Justice of the Texas Supreme Court; 1864–1866 | Succeeded by Court abolished |
| Preceded by Newly constituted court | Justice of the Texas Supreme Court; 1874–1876 | Succeeded by Court abolished |
