= Sawnie Robertson =

American judge (1850–1892)

Sawnie Robertson (October 5, 1850 – June 21, 1892) was a justice of the Supreme Court of Texas from October 1885 to September 1886.

Born in Chambers County, Alabama, to John C. Robertson and Sarah J. (Goodman) Robertson, the family moved to Texas in 1851, settling first in Jefferson and later in Henderson and Tyler. Robertson read law under Oran Milo Roberts, later governor of Texas and chief justice of the Texas Supreme Court. Robertson gained admission to the bar in Texas on December 29, 1870.

In 1885, at the age of 35, he was appointed by Governor John Ireland to a seat on the supreme bench vacated by the death of Justice Charles S. West. Robertson served for a year, and then resigned and returned to his law practice with Mr. Coke. Robertson remained in this partnership until his death, at age 41.

Political offices
Preceded by Charles S. West	Justice of the Texas Supreme Court; 1885–1886	Succeeded by Reuben R. Gaines
