= Robert S. Gould =

American judge (1826–1904)

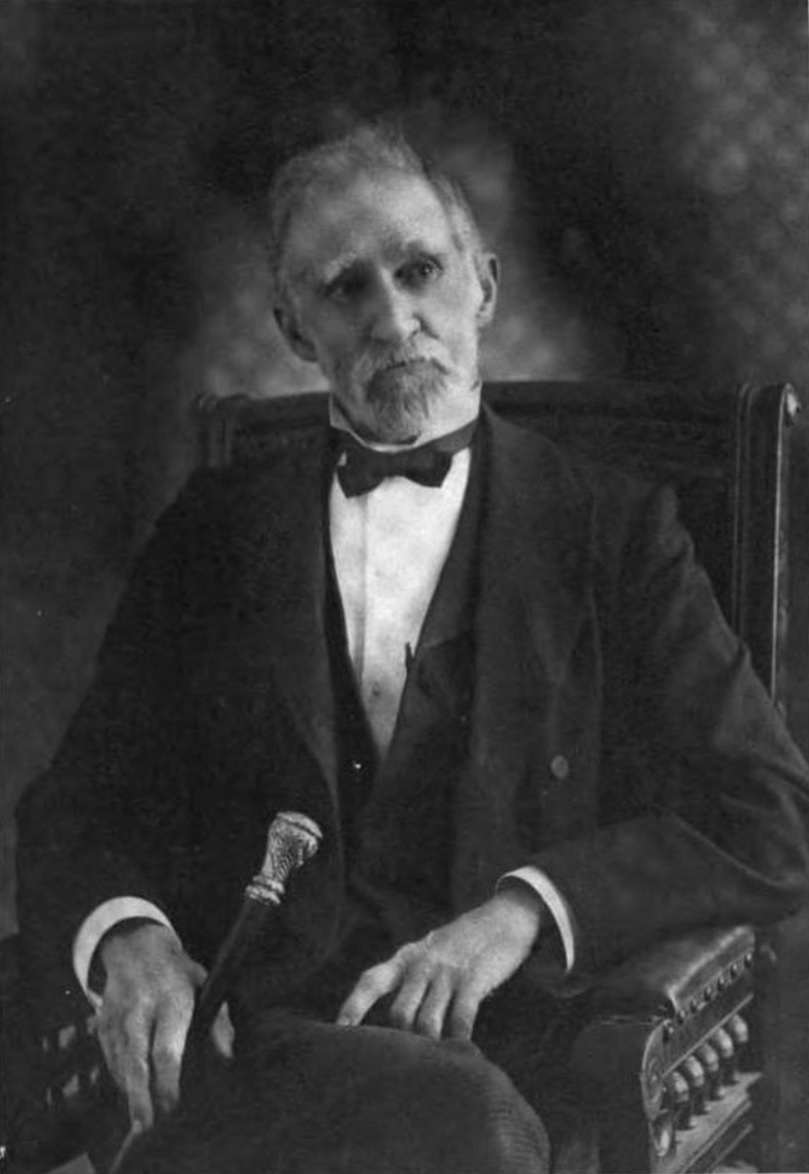
Robert S. Gould, Chief Justice of the Texas Supreme Court

Robert Simonton Gould (December 16, 1826 – June 30, 1904) was a justice of the Texas Supreme Court from May 1874 to December 1882, serving as chief justice from November 1881 to December 1882.

== Early life, education, and career ==
Born in Statesville, Iredell County, North Carolina, Gould's father Daniel Gould was a Presbyterian minister who died when Gould was seven years old. His mother, Zilpha Gould, moved to Tuscaloosa, Alabama, in 1837. Gould entered the University of Alabama at fourteen and graduated at age eighteen. He was shortly after appointed tutor of mathematics in the university and held the position for three years, receiving an A.M. degree in 1847. He was licensed to practice law in 1849, and moved to Macon, Mississippi, where he entered into practice in partnership with the Joshua Martin, a former Governor of Alabama. Gould moved to Texas in 1850, and having been admitted to practice in the courts of this State by Judge R. E. B. Baylor, settled at Centerville, Leon County. He was elected district attorney in 1853, and continued in that office until 1857. In 1861 he was elected district judge, resigning to enter the army during the American Civil War.

== Military service ==
Gould was a member of the Secession Convention of 1861. He raised a company of cavalry in Leon County for the Confederate service, of which he was elected captain, and this company being united with four others in a battalion, he was elected major-commanding. Gould's battalion was a part of Randle's brigade and of Walker's division. It participated in the battles of Mansfield, Pleasant Hill, and Jenkins' Ferry. At Jenkins' Ferry Gould was wounded and had his horse killed under him. Other companies being united with the battalion, Gould was promoted to colonel. At the close of the war Gould resumed the practice of law in Leon County. In 1866 he was elected district judge but was shortly afterward removed by general military order as an impediment to reconstruction.

== Legal practice and later life ==
In 1870, Gould moved to Galveston, Texas, where he practiced law in partnership with his nephew, Robert Gould Street, under the firm name of Gould & Street. In 1874 Gould was appointed, by Governor Richard Coke, Associate Justice of the Supreme Court, and in 1876 was elected to the same office, which position he held until 1881, when he was appointed Chief Justice, serving in that capacity until 1883. In 1883 he was elected, by the regents, Professor of Law in the University of Texas. He continued in this position until his death.

== Personal life ==
In 1855, Gould married Serena Barnes, a daughter of Dr. P. Barnes of Leon county. They had a son, Robert, who had four children of his own; Robert died young, and the children were raised by Gould and his wife, in Austin. Gould received an LL.D. from the Southwestern Presbyterian University at Clarksville, Tennessee, in 1886. He became a member of the First Presbyterian Church of Galveston on April 19, 1874, and later transferred to the Presbyterian church of Austin, remaining a consistent Christian until his death. Gould's funeral was "one of the largest attended" in the history of Austin to that date.

Political offices
Preceded by Peter W. Gray	Justice of the Texas Supreme Court; 1874–1882	Succeeded by John W. Stayton
Preceded by George F. Moore	Chief Justice of the Texas Supreme Court; 1881–1882	Succeeded by Asa H. Willie
