= William Pierson (judge) =

American judge (1871–1935)

William Pierson (March 12, 1871 – April 24, 1935) was a justice of the Supreme Court of Texas from January 1921 to April 1935.

Pierson, a native of Gilmer, Texas, and a graduate of Baylor University and the University of Texas, was elected to a seat on the Eighth Judicial District of Texas in 1912, serving until Governor Pat Morris Neff appointed to the state supreme court in 1921. He had previously served in the Texas House of Representatives. Married in 1901, he had three children. Judge Pierson and his wife, Lena, were murdered by their youngest child, Howard; the 21-year-old had suffered from mental illness for some time. The couple were buried in the Texas State Cemetery.

Political offices
Preceded by William E. Hawkins	Justice of the Texas Supreme Court; 1921–1935	Succeeded by Richard Critz
