= J. E. Hickman =

American judge (1883–1962)

John Edward Hickman (March 28, 1883 – April 26, 1962) was a justice of the Supreme Court of Texas from 1945 to 1948, and chief justice from 1948 to 1961.

Political offices
Preceded by Newly created seat	Justice of the Texas Supreme Court; 1945–1948	Succeeded by W. St. John Garwood
Preceded by James P. Alexander	Chief Justice of the Texas Supreme Court; 1948–1961	Succeeded by Robert W. Calvert
