= Stockton P. Donley =

American judge (1821–1871)

Stockton P. Donley (May 27, 1821 – February 17, 1871) was an attorney, and an associate justice of the Supreme Court of Texas from October 1866 to September 1867.

== Biography ==
Donley was born in Howard County, Missouri on May 27, 1821. He went to Transylvania University and was admitted to the bar in Kentucky. Donley moved to Clarksville, Texas, in 1846 and to Rusk, Texas, the following year. He was elected district attorney of the Sixth Judicial District in 1853.

Donley moved to Tyler in 1860. In the Civil War, Donley enlisted in the Seventh Regiment of Texas Volunteers under Colonel John Gregg. At Fort Donelson in 1862, Donley's regiment was captured. He was eventually released in an exchange due to failing health. In 1866, he was elected to the Supreme Court of Texas but was removed by the Reconstruction military government. Donley died in Kaufman in 1871.

Donley County, Texas is named for him.

Political offices
Preceded by Newly constituted court	Justice of the Texas Supreme Court; 1866–1867	Succeeded by Court abolished
