= W. F. Moore =

American judge (1868–1956)

William Folsom Moore (October 28, 1868 – November 3, 1956) was a justice of the Supreme Court of Texas from April 1940 to January 1941.

Political offices
Preceded by Calvin Maples Cureton	Justice of the Texas Supreme Court; 1940–1941	Succeeded by James P. Alexander
