= Robert W. Calvert =

American judge (1905–1994)

Robert Wilburn Calvert (February 22, 1905 – October 6, 1994) was a justice of the Supreme Court of Texas from September 18, 1950, to October 4, 1972, serving as chief justice from January 3, 1961, to October 4, 1972.

His father died when he was seven, and his destitute mother placed him in an orphanage, where he endured harsh conditions for ten years, including the death of his sister from the Spanish flu in 1918. He graduated as salutatorian of the State Orphans' Home high school 1923, and then studied law at the University of Texas at Austin. He was elected to the Texas House of Representatives in 1933, and was Speaker of the Texas House of Representatives from 1937 to 1939.

Political offices
Preceded by Coke R. Stevenson	Speaker of the Texas House of Representatives; 1937–1939	Succeeded by Robert Emmett Morse
Preceded by R. H. Harvey	Justice of the Texas Supreme Court; 1950–1961	Succeeded by Zollie Steakley
Preceded by J. E. Hickman	Chief Justice of the Texas Supreme Court; 1961–1972	Succeeded by Joe R. Greenhill
