= R. H. Harvey =

American judge (1893–1950)

Ralph Hicks Harvey (July 20, 1893 – September 8, 1950) was a justice of the Supreme Court of Texas from March 1, 1949, to September 8, 1950. He died in office.

Political offices
| Preceded by Gordon Simpson | Justice of the Texas Supreme Court; 1949–1950 | Succeeded by Robert W. Calvert |
