= John W. Stayton =

American lawyer and judge (1830–1894)

Justice of the Supreme Court of Texas
- In office November 2, 1881 – July 5, 1894
- Preceded by: Robert S. Gould
- Succeeded by: A. S. Walker

Chief Justice of the Supreme Court of Texas
- In office March 3, 1888 – July 5, 1894
- Preceded by: Asa H. Willie
- Succeeded by: Reuben R. Gaines

Personal details
- Born: Alexander Stuart Walker; December 24, 1830 Washington County, Kentucky, US
- Died: July 5, 1894 (aged 63) Tyler, Texas, US
- Relations: Henry Pirtle (uncle)
- Occupation: Attorney, judge

Military service
- Branch/service: Confederate States Army
- Battles/wars: American Civil War

John William Stayton (December 24, 1830 – July 5, 1894) was an American lawyer and judge who served as justice of the Supreme Court of Texas from November 1881 to July 1894, serving as chief justice from March 1888 to July 1894.

== Early life and education ==
Born on December 24, 1830, in Washington County, Kentucky, to Robert G. Harriet Stayton (née Pirtle). Slayton and his family moved to then-unsettled southwestern Kentucky in 1832. Orphaned by fourteen, he assisted with his grandfather's farming, before he left at seventeen and got work as a blacksmith. Using his blacksmithing salary, he paid for nighttime tutoring, which was most of his education, which evolved into the scholarliness of his adult life, reportedly reading 40 pages of law every day except Sundays, as well as owning one of the largest collections of Roman and Spanish lawbooks in Texas.

He became a school assistant in 1852, until by suggestion by his uncle, judge Henry Pirtle he began studying law at University of Louisville; he graduated in March 1856. In April, he married Eliza Jane Weldon, moving to La Grange, Texas in November 1857.

== Career ==
An admittee to the State Bar of Texas, Slayton moved to Pleasanton due to his financial situation. There, he practiced law and worked as a blacksmith, then serving as attorney of the Eighteenth Judicial District from 1858 to 1862. He served in the American Civil War, retiring ranked Captain. He taught in Clinton, DeWitt County after the war. In 1866, he formed a law partnership with Samuel Cabell Lackey, and a coparternship with Alexander H. Phillips which lasted until Phillips' retirement in 1878. The firm was renamed to Stayton, Lackey, and Kleberg following the partnership with Robert—Slayton's son— and Robert J. Kleberg. Slayton also attended the Constitutional Convention of 1875.

Following the vacancy of Robert S. Gould's seat in the Supreme Court of Texas, Stayton was appointed to the court by Oran Milo Roberts, on November 2, 1881, serving until July 1894. During his tenure, he was nominated to preside over the United States Court of Appeals for the Seventh Circuit in 1884, which he declined, possibly due to a petition from the State Bar of Texas suggesting he not. After Chief Justice Asa H. Willie resigned on March 3, 1888, Stayton was appointed to it by Lawrence Sullivan Ross. While in the Supreme Court, he helped legally define "community property" in Texas, expanded the rights of Texas employees and landowners, and made corporations liable of neglect.

== Death ==
He died in office on July 5, 1894, in Tyler, Texas, during a visit with his daughter. Following his death, the State Bar of Texas and the Supreme Court of Texas gathered for a special session to mourn him. He was described as calm and compotent at his job.

Political offices
Preceded by Robert S. Gould	Justice of the Texas Supreme Court; 1881–1894	Succeeded by A. S. Walker
Preceded by Asa H. Willie	Chief Justice of the Texas Supreme Court; 1888–1894	Succeeded by Reuben R. Gaines
