= Micajah H. Bonner =

American judge (1828–1883)

Micajah Hubbard Bonner (January 25, 1828 – November 28, 1883) was a justice of the Texas Supreme Court from November 1878 to December 1882.

Born in Greenville, Alabama, Bonner attended La Grange College in Kentucky, he gained admission to the bar in Mississippi in 1848. He then moved to Texas, practicing for a time with former governor James Pinckney Henderson.

Bonner was appointed by Governor Richard B. Hubbard to succeed Judge George F. Moore, who had been elected Chief Judge, and judges Bonner, Moore, and Gould constituted the Court for some time. Bonner declined to run for reelection in 1882.

Political offices
Preceded by George F. Moore	Justice of the Texas Supreme Court; 1878–1882	Succeeded by Charles S. West
