= Asa H. Willie =

American judge (1829–1899)

Chief Justice of the Supreme Court of Texas
- In office 1882–1888
- Preceded by: Robert S. Gould
- Succeeded by: John W. Stayton

Member of the U.S. House of Representatives from Texas's at-large district
- In office March 4, 1873 – March 3, 1875
- Preceded by: District established
- Succeeded by: Gustave Schleicher

Personal details
- Born: Asa Hoxie Willie; October 11, 1829 Washington, Georgia, US
- Died: March 16, 1899 (aged 69) Galveston, Texas, US
- Party: Democratic
- Relations: James Willie (brother)
- Profession: Lawyer, judge, politician

Asa Hoxie Willie (October 11, 1829 – March 16, 1899) was an American lawyer, judge and politician. He served as a United States representative representing Texas and chief justice of the Supreme Court of Texas. During the American Civil War, he served as a major in the Confederate Army. A Democrat, he served one term in Congress from 1873 to 1875 as an at-large member.

== Early life ==
Willie was born on October 11, 1829, in Washington, Georgia, to James and Caroline Willie (née Hoxie). He attended private schools in Wilkes County, Georgia until age 16, when he moved to Brenham, Texas in 1846 and studied law in the office of his older brother James. He was admitted to the bar in 1848 and commenced practice in Brenham. He was elected district attorney of the third judicial district of Texas from 1852 to 1854.

== Civil War ==
In 1858, Willie moved to Marshall, where he and Alexander Pope formed a law partnership. He married Bettie Johnson of Brandon, Mississippi in 1859. With the outbreak of the American Civil War, Willie was commissioned a major in the Seventh Texas Infantry of the Confederate Army on the staff of Colonel John Gregg. Willie was captured along with most of his troops at Fort Donelson in February 1862. The captured men were confined at Johnson's Island for nine months before the regiment was exchanged in time to take part in the Battle of Chickamauga in September 1863. Willie fought the rest of the battles of the Army of Tennessee until its surrender.

== Political and judicial career ==
After the Civil War, Willie moved to Galveston, Texas and in 1866 was elected Associate Justice of the Texas Supreme Court but was removed by Reconstruction military authorities in 1867. After his service on the court, he resumed the practice of law. After Reconstruction was complete and Texans resumed their rights under the U.S. Constitution, Texas received two additional congressional representatives through apportionment as a result of the 1870 census. The legislature did not redraw the state's 4 congressional districts and instead allowed two members to be elected in at-large districts. He was elected to Congress in 1872 and served for one term. He did not seek reelection in 1874 and returned to Galveston where he was elected city attorney in 1875 and 1876. In 1882, he was appointed Chief Justice of the Texas Supreme Court by Governor Oran Milo Roberts and served until his retirement in 1888.

Willie died in Galveston on March 16, 1899, and was interred at the Trinity Episcopal Church Cemetery in Galveston.

U.S. House of Representatives
Preceded by District established	Member of the U.S. House of Representatives from Texas's at-large congressional seat 1873–1875	Succeeded by Gustave Schleicher
Legal offices
Preceded by Robert S. Gould	Texas Supreme Court Justice, Chief Justice; 1882-1888	Succeeded by John W. Stayton
