= James P. Alexander =

American judge (1883–1948)

James Patterson Alexander (April 21, 1883 – January 1, 1948) was a justice of the Supreme Court of Texas from January 1941 to 1948, serving as chief justice from September 21, 1945 to January 1, 1948.

Political offices
Preceded by W. F. Moore	Chief Justice of the Texas Supreme Court; 1941–1948	Succeeded by J. E. Hickman
