= Zollie Steakley =

American judge

Zollie C. Steakley, Jr.

Secretary of State of Texas
- In office 1957–1961
- Appointed by: Price Daniel
- Preceded by: Tom Reavley
- Succeeded by: P. Frank Lake

Justice of the Supreme Court of Texas, Place 3
- In office 1961–1980

Personal details
- Born: August 29, 1908 Fisher County, Texas, U.S.
- Died: March 24, 1992 (aged 83) Austin, Texas, U.S.
- Party: Democratic
- Spouse: Ruth Butler Steakley

Zollie Coffer Steakley, Jr. (August 29, 1908 – March 24, 1992) was a Texas lawyer, politician, and judge who served as Secretary of State of Texas and as a justice of the Texas Supreme Court.

== Early years and education ==
Steakley was born in Rotan, Texas, and moved to Comanche County, Texas, as a young child where he grew up and attended school. He graduated as valedictorian from DeLeon High School in 1926, and earned a Bachelor of Arts degree from Simmons University (now Hardin-Simmons University) in Abilene in 1929. While at Simmons University, Steakley excelled in baseball and as a member of the debate team. Upon graduation, he declined a professional baseball contract to pursue a law degree. Steakley earned an LL.B. from The University of Texas School of Law in 1932, where he served as student editor of the Texas Law Review.

== Career ==
Steakley returned to West Texas shortly after graduating from law school in 1929. He practiced law throughout the 1930s in Sweetwater and assisted his father in his Chevrolet dealership business. In 1939, Texas attorney general, Gerald Mann, offered Steakley a position as assistant attorney general, and he returned to Austin. After serving as assistant attorney general for three years, Steakley joined the U.S. Navy after the Japanese attack on Pearl Harbor, serving from 1942 to 1945 in naval intelligence and earning the rank of lieutenant commander.

Following the war, Steakley returned to Austin and briefly served again as assistant attorney general under Grover Sellers. He then re-entered private practice, forming a partnership with the distinguished Austin lawyer, Herbert Smith, in September 1946. Steakley practiced law as a partner of this newly established firm, Smith and Steakley for over 10 years, when Senator Price Daniel offered him the position of secretary of state prior to Daniel's likely Gubernatorial victory in November 1956. Steakley served as Texas secretary of state from 1957 until 1961. As the secretary of state, Steakley played an influential role in liaising with the legislature to promote and ultimately pass Daniel's initiatives in numerous areas including the interstate gas tax and escheat law. Steakley ensured the 1960 election of President Kennedy and Vice President Johnson by certifying the narrow results in Texas and rejecting Republican claims of election fraud.

Gov. Price Daniel appointed Steakley to the Texas Supreme Court on January 1, 1961 to fill the vacancy created when Robert Calvert became chief justice. Steakley was subsequently elected to the position in November 1962, and reelected in 1968 and 1974. He retired from the court on December 31, 1980. During his tenure he authored an estimated 200 major opinions and was an authority in many areas of law. Following his retirement from the bench, Steakley served as special assistant to attorney general Mark White. When White was elected governor, Steakley became a special assistant in the governor's office of general counsel. He also assisted attorneys general Jim Mattox and Dan Morales.

== Legacy and death ==
In addition to his work as a lawyer and judge, Steakley was involved in numerous civic organizations throughout his lifetime to include the Boy Scouts, the Lions Club of Austin, and the Christian Education Commission. He served as the president of the Austin Lions Club and as district governor for Lions International. Steakley served as the director of the United Fund of Austin and as the chairman of the Baptist Commission of Texas. He taught a radio Bible class from Austin's Paramount Theater for forty-two years that reached a large audience in central and east Texas, and was regularly attended by Texas governors and other prominent politicians. In fact, Price Daniel and Ralph Yarborough, fierce rivals within the Texas Democratic Party, regularly attended Steakley's bible class and were both among his closest personal friends.

Steakley was widely respected among the Texas ruling elite throughout his years of public service. At a special session of the Texas Supreme Court to honor Steakley after his death, former chief justice Joe Greenhill stated "The State of Texas is a better place for free men and women to live because of his services on the Court. Those of us who were privileged to serve with him are richer for our association with him, and he deserves to be remembered as one of the ablest judges ever to site on this Court." Considered a gifted public speaker, Steakley was often invited to deliver commencements and speeches throughout his lifetime of public service, and President Lyndon Johnson once described Steakley as an "orator and advocate without peer".

Steakley served on the board of trustees of Hardin-Simmons University, his alma mater, for eighteen years. He died in his home in Austin at the age of eighty-three.

== See also ==
- Secretary of State of Texas

== Sources ==
- In Memoriam: Honorable Zollie Steakley. The Supreme Court of Texas, June 11, 1993. 879 S.W.2d XXXIX-XLIII (1993).
- Zollie Coffer Steakley, Jr. & Leona Ruth Butler: First 100 Years in Nolan County Texas (1985). http://www.rootsweb.com/~txnolan/nolan_co100yr/steakley_zollie_coffer.htm
- Zollie Coffer Steakley, 25:42 Forty Acres Facts: The Faculty and Staff Newsletter for Hardin –Simmons University, June 23, 2003, 1 & 3. https://web.archive.org/web/20060901185633/http://www.hsutx.edu/news/archive/20030623.pdf
- Oral Memoirs of Zollie Coffer Steakley, Baylor University Institute for Oral History. 1983.

Political offices
Preceded by Tom Reavley	Secretary of State of Texas; 1957–1962	Succeeded by P. Frank Lake
Legal offices
Preceded by Robert W. Calvert	Justice of the Supreme Court of Texas, Place 3; 1961–1980	Succeeded by James P. Wallace
