= George F. Moore (Texas judge) =

American lawyer and judge (1822–1883)

Chief Justice of the Supreme Court of Texas
- In office October 1862 – June 1866
- Preceded by: Oran M. Roberts
- Succeeded by: Court restructured
- In office November 1878 – November 1881
- Preceded by: Newly constituted court
- Succeeded by: Robert S. Gould

Chief Justice of the Supreme Court of Texas
- In office October 1862 – June 1866
- Preceded by: Newly constituted court
- Succeeded by: Micajah H. Bonner
- In office January 27, 1874 – April 1876
- Preceded by: Oran M. Roberts
- Succeeded by: Robert S. Gould

Personal details
- Born: George Fleming Moore; July 12, 1822 Elbert County, Georgia, US
- Died: August 30, 1883 (aged 61) Washington, D.C., US
- Occupation: Lawyer, judge

Military service
- Branch/service: Confederate States Army
- Years of service: –1862
- Rank: Colonel
- Battles/wars: American Civil War
- Regiment: Seventeenth Texas Cavalry Regiment

George Fleming Moore (July 17, 1822 – August 30, 1883) was an American lawyer and judge, who served as justice of the Supreme Court of Texas from October 1862 to June 1866, chief justice, August 1866 to September 1867, a justice again from January 1874 to April 1876, and chief justice again from November 1878 to November 1881.

== Early life and education ==
Moore was born on July 17, 1822, in Elbert County, Georgia, the seventh child of William H. and Mary Garland Moore (née Marks). His family moved to Alabama, and Moore attended University of Alabama, as well as the University of Virginia. He was admitted to the bar in 1844. He lived in Crockett, Texas from 1846 until returning to Alabama by 1849, where he married Susan Spyker, with whom he had seven children with. In 1854, they moved to Austin, then in 1856, to Nacogdoches.

== Legal career ==
In Texas, he became the third reporter for the Supreme Court of Texas, alongside Richard S. Walker. During the American Civil War, Moore enlisted to the Seventeenth Texas Cavalry Regiment, achieving the rank of colonel by the time he left in October 1862, when he was appointed a justice of the Supreme Court of Texas, serving until June 1866. During his tenure, he upheld Texas' right to draft soldiers. From August 1866 to September 1867, he was Chief Justice, but was removed by the United States military for his decisions to repeal Reconstruction.

Moore continued practicing law until, January 27, 1874, he was reappointed a justice by Richard Coke. Following the resignation of Oran Milo Roberts, he was elected Chief Justice in November 1878 after winning by over 100,000 votes; he served until resigning in November 1881. As opposed to his first tenure as Chief Justice, he was successful in his regressive decisions the second time, such as in Williamson v. Lane (1879)—a case over a contested election—where he ruled that the Supreme Court had no jurisdiction to rule over cases about elections, and that the decision of the lower court—which favored a Democratic victory—would be upheld.

Moore died on August 30, 1883, aged 61, in Washington, D.C., and was interred in Austin.

Political offices
| Preceded by Oran M. Roberts | Justice of the Texas Supreme Court; 1862–1866 | Succeeded by Court restructured |
| Preceded by Newly constituted court | Chief Justice of the Texas Supreme Court; 1866–1867 | Succeeded by Robert S. Gould |
| Preceded by Newly constituted court | Justice of the Texas Supreme Court; 1874–1878 | Succeeded by Micajah H. Bonner |
| Preceded by Oran M. Roberts | Chief Justice of the Texas Supreme Court; 1881–1881 | Succeeded by Robert S. Gould |
