= Thomas Jefferson Brown =

American judge (1836–1915)

Chief Justice of the Texas Supreme Court
- In office January 1911 – May 26, 1915
- Preceded by: Reuben R. Gaines
- Succeeded by: Nelson Phillips

Associate Justice of the Texas Supreme Court
- In office May 1893 – January 1911
- Preceded by: John L. Henry
- Succeeded by: William F. Ramsey

Member of the Texas House of Representatives from the 27th district
- In office January 9, 1889 – September 5, 1892 Serving with John Haywood Tolbert
- Preceded by: Fremont A. Utiger
- Succeeded by: Jeremiah Heath Long

Personal details
- Born: July 24, 1836 Jasper County, Georgia, U.S.
- Died: May 26, 1915 (aged 78) Greenville, Texas, U.S.
- Party: Democratic
- Spouse: Louisa T. Estes (m. 1859)
- Children: 7
- Education: Baylor University (LL.B)
- Profession: Jurist; military officer

Military service
- Allegiance: Confederate States
- Branch/service: Confederate States Army
- Rank: Captain
- Unit: 22nd Texas Cavalry Regiment
- Commands: Company E
- Battles/wars: American Civil War

Thomas Jefferson Brown (July 24, 1836 – May 26, 1915) was an American jurist and politician. He was a member of the Texas House of Representatives and represented the 27th district from 1889 until his resignation in 1892. He was a justice of the Supreme Court of Texas from May 1893 to May 1915, and was chief justice from January 1911 until his death on May 26, 1915.

== Early life ==
Thomas Jefferson Brown was born in Jasper County, Georgia, on July 24, 1836, as the son of Erwin and Mathilda (née Burdette) Brown. His father, Ervin Brown, was originally from North Carolina and moved to Jasper County, Georgia. His mother was from South Carolina, and was the daughter of Henry Burdette, who was a pioneer of Jasper County. Brown moved at the age of ten with his family to Washington County, Texas. He attended the public schools of Washington County and was among the first graduates of Baylor Law School, attaining a Bachelor of Laws degree. He passed the bar exam the following year. He had practiced law in a partnership with future governor James W. Throckmorton and Russell DeArmond. He was a second lieutenant, and later captain, of the Twenty-second Texas Cavalry Regiment in the American Civil War. He resigned before the end of the war due to failing health.

== Career ==
After the war, he returned to the practice of law and moved to Sherman in 1872. He served in the Twenty-first and Twenty-second Texas Legislature from 1888 until he resigned on September 5, 1892. He was the Chair of the House Committee on Internal Improvements in 1889 and 1891. While a legislator, Brown "focused his energies on establishing regulations to curb corporate aggression and led an effort that resulted in the creation of the Texas Railroad Commission".

He was a Texas district court judge for Grayson and Collin County from 1892 to 1893. In 1893, he became an associate justice of the Supreme Court of Texas, and held the position until January 1911, when Chief Justice Reuben Reid Gaines resigned and Brown was appointed chief justice.

In his later years, his eyesight began to fail. At night, he would often walk the grounds of the Texas Capitol with a tall staff similar to a shepherd's crook, with a light hung on the top. He died at Greenville, Texas, of stomach cancer.

Legal offices
Preceded by Reuben R. Gaines	Chief Justice of the Texas Supreme Court; 1911–1915	Succeeded by Nelson Phillips
Preceded by John L. Henry	Associate Justice of the Texas Supreme Court; 1893–1911	Succeeded by William F. Ramsey
Political offices
Preceded by Fremont A. Utiger	Member of the Texas House of Representatives from District 27 (Sherman); 1889–1892; With: John Haywood Tolbert	Succeeded by Jeremiah Heath Long
