= Joe R. Greenhill =

American judge

22nd Chief Justice of the Texas Supreme Court
- In office October 4, 1972 – October 25, 1982
- Appointed by: Preston Smith
- Preceded by: Robert W. Calvert
- Succeeded by: Jack Pope

Associate Justice of the Texas Supreme Court
- In office October 1, 1957 – October 4, 1972
- Appointed by: Price Daniel
- Preceded by: Few Brewster
- Succeeded by: Hawthorne Phillips

Personal details
- Born: Joe Robert Greenhill; June 14, 1914 Abilene, Texas, U.S.
- Died: February 11, 2011 (aged 96) Austin, Texas, U.S.
- Education: University of Texas (BA, BBA, LLB)

Military service
- Branch/service: United States Navy
- Battles/wars: World War II

Joe Robert Greenhill (July 14, 1914 – February 11, 2011) was an American attorney. He served on the Texas Supreme Court for 25 years, 10 of those as chief justice.

== Biography ==
Born in Houston, Texas, Greenhill attended the University of Texas, where he earned Bachelor of Arts and Bachelor of Business Administration degrees in 1936 and a Bachelor of Laws degree in 1939 where he was a member of the Texas Cowboys. During World War II, he served as junior officer in the United States Navy, first in intelligence and then as executive officer of a mine sweeper in the Pacific Theater. He became Assistant Attorney General of the State of Texas in 1948, co-founded Graves, Dougherty & Greenhill in 1950 and was appointed to the Texas Supreme Court in 1957, where he served until 1982. He received an honorary Doctor of Law degree from Southern Methodist University in 1977.

Greenhill was of counsel at Baker Botts.
