= 2022 Texas elections =

- November 8, 2022

Elections were held in Texas on November 8, 2022. Primary elections were held on March 1, with runoffs held on May 24 for primary candidates who did not receive a majority of the vote.

All of the states' executive offices were up for election, as well as all seats of the Texas Legislature and all 38 seats in the United States House of Representatives, an additional two of which were apportioned to the state following the 2020 redistricting cycle based on data from the 2020 census.

== Executive ==
=== Governor ===
Incumbent Republican governor Greg Abbott successfully ran for re-election to a third term. He was re-elected in 2018 with 55.8% of the vote.

Abbott faced a number of Republican challengers, including former party chair and ex-Florida congressman Allen West, former state senator Don Huffines, and political commentator Chad Prather, all of which have been vocal critics of Abbott due to his handling of the COVID-19 pandemic in Texas. Former U.S. representative and 2018 U.S. Senate nominee Beto O'Rourke won the Democratic primary.

2022 Texas gubernatorial election
Party	Candidate	Votes	%	±%
Republican	Greg Abbott (incumbent)	4,437,099	54.76%	−1.05%
Democratic	Beto O'Rourke	3,553,656	43.86%	+1.35%
Libertarian	Mark Tippetts	81,932	1.01%	−0.68%
Green	Delilah Barrios	28,584	0.35%	N/A
Write-in		1,637	0.02%	N/A
Total votes		8,102,908	100.0%	
Republican hold				

=== Lieutenant governor ===
Incumbent Republican lieutenant governor Dan Patrick successfully ran for re-election to a third term. He was re-elected in 2018 with 51.3% of the vote.

Republican candidates include activist Trayce Bradford and secessionist Daniel Miller Democratic candidates included 2018 nominee Mike Collier and state representative Michelle Beckley.

2022 Texas lieutenant gubernatorial election
Party	Candidate	Votes	%	±%
Republican	Dan Patrick (incumbent)	4,317,692	53.75%	+2.45%
Democratic	Mike Collier	3,492,544	43.48%	−3.01%
Libertarian	Shanna Steele	222,208	2.77%	+0.56%
Total votes		8,032,444	100.0%	
Republican hold				

=== Attorney general ===
Incumbent Republican attorney general Ken Paxton successfully ran for re-election to a third term. He was re-elected in 2018 with 50.6% of the vote.

Paxton was challenged by Land Commissioner George P. Bush, former Texas Supreme Court Justice Eva Guzman, and U.S. Representative Louie Gohmert in the Republican primary. Former Galveston mayor Joe Jaworski, Attorney Lee Merritt who dropped out and endorsed eventual primary nominee, ACLU attorney Rochelle Garza, were running in the Democratic primary.

2022 Texas Attorney General election
Party	Candidate	Votes	%	±%
Republican	Ken Paxton (incumbent)	4,278,986	53.42%	+2.85%
Democratic	Rochelle Garza	3,497,267	43.66%	−3.35%
Libertarian	Mark Ash	233,750	2.92%	+0.49%
Total votes		8,010,003	100.0%	
Republican hold				

=== Comptroller of Public Accounts ===
Incumbent Republican comptroller Glenn Hegar successfully ran for re-election to a third term. He was re-elected in 2018 with 53.2% of the vote.

Hegar's sole Republican challenger was businessman Mark Golby. Accountant Janet Dudding, attorney Tim Mahoney, and strategist Angel Luis Vega ran for the Democratic nomination.

2022 Texas Comptroller election
Party	Candidate	Votes	%	±%
Republican	Glenn Hegar (incumbent)	4,496,319	56.39%	+3.20%
Democratic	Janet Dudding	3,265,069	40.95%	−2.44%
Libertarian	Alonzo Echavarria-Garza	212,205	2.66%	−0.76%
Total votes		7,973,593	100.0%	
Republican hold				

=== Commissioner of the General Land Office ===
Incumbent Republican Land Commissioner George P. Bush retired to run for attorney general. He was re-elected in 2018 with 53.7% of the vote. He was replaced by fellow Republican Dawn Buckingham, who won with 56.2% of the vote.

2022 Texas Land Commissioner election
Party	Candidate	Votes	%	±%
Republican	Dawn Buckingham	4,463,452	56.15%	+2.47%
Democratic	Jay Kleberg	3,350,291	42.15%	−1.04%
Green	Alfred Molison Jr.	133,034	1.67%	N/A
Total votes		7,948,589	100.0%	
Republican hold				

=== Commissioner of Agriculture ===
2022 Texas Agriculture Commissioner election
- November 8, 2022
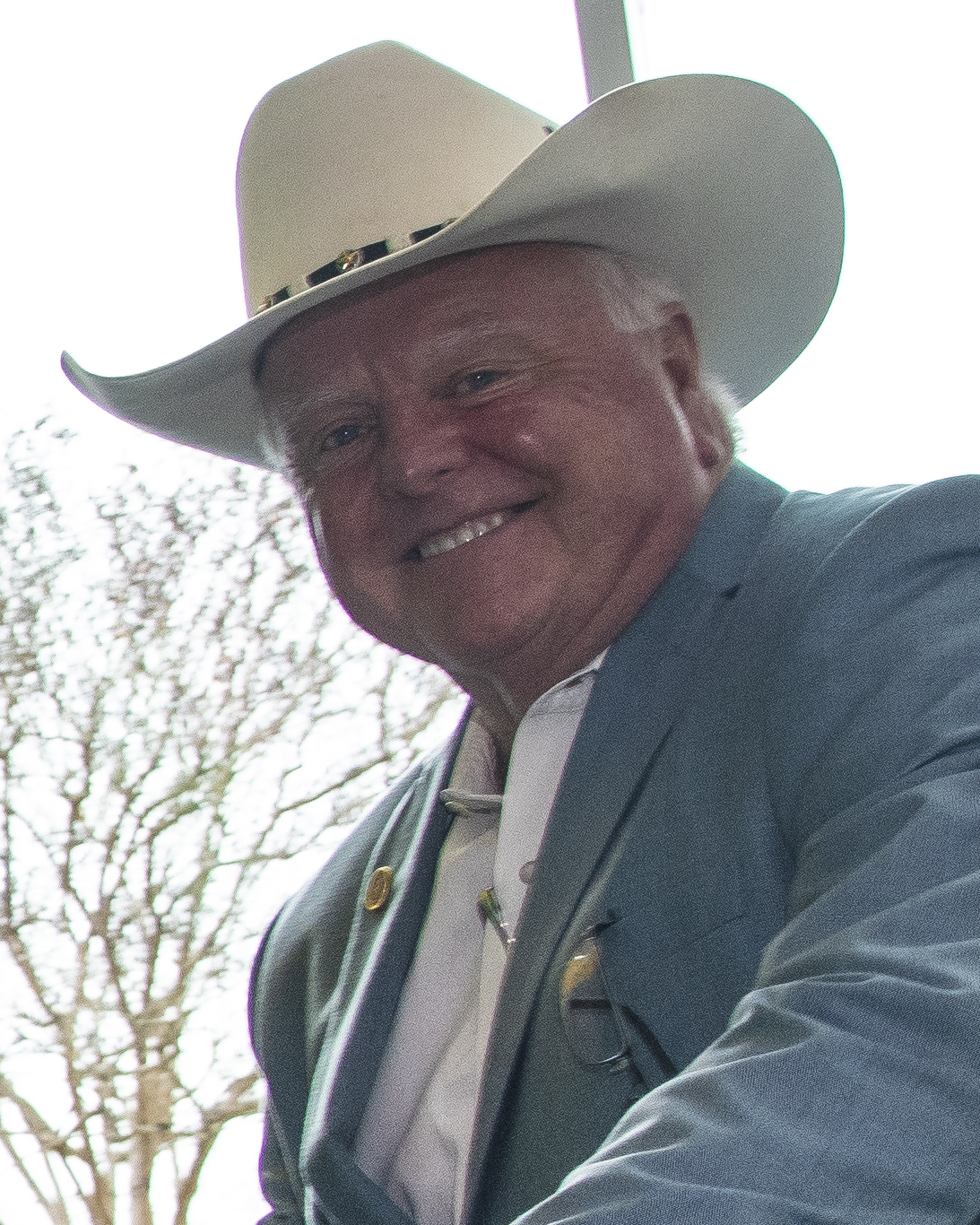

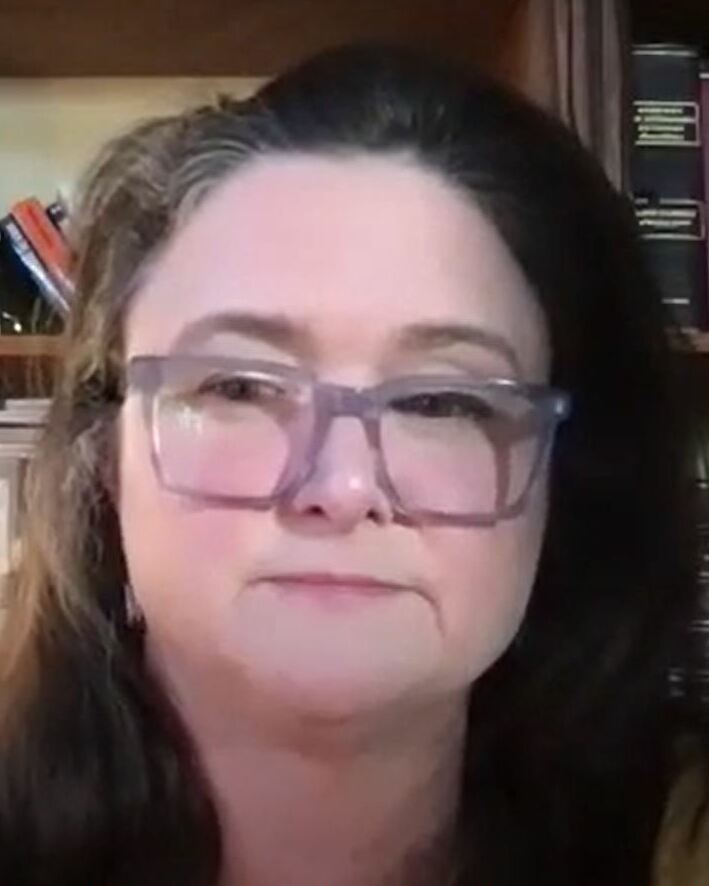
Nominee	Sid Miller	Susan Hays
Party	Republican	Democratic
Popular vote	4,480,186	3,473,603
Percentage	56.33%	43.67%
- Miller: 50–60% 60–70% 70–80% 80–90% >90% Hays: 50–60% 60–70% 70–80% 80–90% >90% Tie: 50% No votes
Agriculture Commissioner before election
Sid Miller
Republican
Elected Agriculture Commissioner
Sid Miller
Republican

Incumbent Republican Agriculture Commissioner Sid Miller ran for re-election to a third term. He was re-elected in 2018 with 51.3% of the vote. He was re-elected for a third term with 56.4% of the vote.

==== Republican primary ====
===== Candidates =====
- Sid Miller, incumbent agriculture commissioner

===== Eliminated in primary =====
- Carey A. Counsil, professor and rancher
- James White, state representative from the 19th District

===== Polling =====
Poll source	Date(s) administered	Sample size (Note: Key: A – all adults RV – registered voters LV – likely voters V – unclear)	Margin of error	Carey Counsil	Sid Miller	James White	Undecided
UT Tyler	February 8–15, 2022	577 (LV)	± 4.4%	6%	32%	14%	47%
UT Tyler	January 18–25, 2022	512 (LV)	± 5.1%	5%	25%	7%	63%
YouGov/UH	January 14–24, 2022	490 (LV)	± 3.7%	4%	34%	7%	55%
YouGov/TXHPF	October 14–27, 2021	405 (LV)	± 2.6%	2%	30%	5%	63%

===== Results =====
Republican primary results
Party	Candidate	Votes	%
Republican	Sid Miller (incumbent)	992,330	58.48%
Republican	James White	528,434	31.14%
Republican	Carey A. Counsil	176,083	10.38%
Total votes		1,696,847	100.0%

==== Democratic primary ====
===== Candidates =====
- Susan Hays, cannabis attorney

===== Eliminated in primary =====
- Ed Ireson, businessman

===== Endorsements =====
Susan Hays

Newspapers and other media

- The Austin Chronicle

Labor unions

- Texas AFL–CIO
- Texas Federation of Teachers

Organizations

- Planned Parenthood Texas Votes

===== Polling =====
Poll source	Date(s) administered	Sample size	Margin of error	Susan Hays	Ed Ireson	Undecided
YouGov/UH	January 14–24, 2022	616 (LV)	± 3.3%	27%	10%	63%

===== Results =====
Democratic primary results
Party	Candidate	Votes	%
Democratic	Susan Hays	814,283	82.77%
Democratic	Ed Ireson	169,503	17.23%
Total votes		983,786	100.0%

==== General election ====
===== Polling =====
Poll source	Date(s) administered	Sample size	Margin of error	Sid Miller (R)	Susan Hayes (D)	Undecided
ActiVote	June 23 – September 21, 2022	184 (LV)	± 7.0%	50%	50%	–
Texas Hispanic Policy Foundation	September 6–15, 2022	1,172 (LV)	± 2.9%	48%	41%	11%

===== Results =====
2022 Texas Agriculture Commissioner election
Party	Candidate	Votes	%	±%
Republican	Sid Miller (incumbent)	4,480,186	56.33%	+5.07%
Democratic	Susan Hays	3,473,603	43.67%	−2.74%
Total votes		7,953,789	100.0%	
Republican hold				

=== Railroad Commissioner ===
2022 Texas Railroad Commissioner election
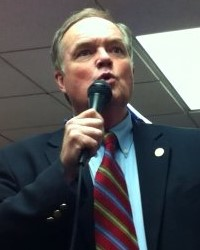

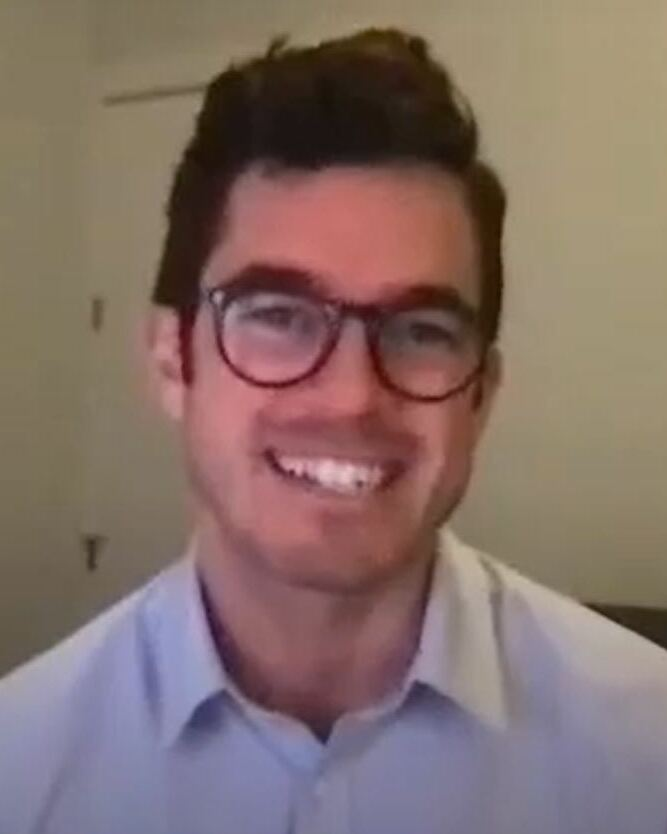
Nominee	Wayne Christian	Luke Warford
Party	Republican	Democratic
Popular vote	4,401,187	3,222,305
Percentage	55.4%	40.5%
- Christian: 40–50% 50–60% 60–70% 70–80% 80–90% >90% Warford: 40–50% 50–60% 60–70% 70–80% 80–90% >90% Tie: 40–50% 50% No votes
Railroad Commissioner before election
Wayne Christian
Republican
Elected Railroad Commissioner
Wayne Christian
Republican

Incumbent Republican Railroad Commissioner Wayne Christian ran for re-election to a second six-year term. He was first elected in 2016 with 53.1% of the vote. He was re-elected with 55.4% of the vote.

==== Republican primary ====
===== Candidates =====
- Wayne Christian, incumbent railroad commissioner

===== Eliminated in runoff =====
- Sarah Stogner, attorney

===== Eliminated in primary =====
- Tom Slocum Jr., engineering consultant
- Marvin Summers, lawyer
- Dawayne Tipton, project manager

===== Endorsements =====
Sarah Stogner

Newspaper and other media

- Austin American-Statesman
- Barstool Sports
- Fort Worth Star-Telegram
- Houston Chronicle
- San Antonio Express-News

===== Polling =====
Poll source	Date(s) administered	Sample size	Margin of error	Wayne Christian	Tom Slocum Jr.	Sarah Stogner	Marvin Summers	Dawayne Tipton	Undecided
YouGov/UH	January 14–24, 2022	490 (LV)	± 3.7%	9%	4%	5%	5%	3%	74%

===== Results =====
Republican primary results
Party	Candidate	Votes	%
Republican	Wayne Christian (incumbent)	775,679	47.37%
Republican	Sarah Stogner	244,949	14.96%
Republican	Tom Slocum Jr.	234,439	14.32%
Republican	Marvin "Sarge" Summers	194,099	11.85%
Republican	Dawayne Tipton	188,428	11.51%
Total votes		1,637,594	100.0%

===== Runoff =====
====== Polling ======
Poll source	Date(s) administered	Sample size	Margin of error	Wayne Christian	Sarah Stogner	Undecided
CWS Research (R) (Note: Poll sponsored by Defend Texas Liberty PAC)	May 4–10, 2022	992 (LV)	± 3.1%	46%	24%	30%
CWS Research (R)	March 29 – April 2, 2022	678 (LV)	± 3.8%	50%	24%	26%

====== Results ======
Republican primary runoff results
Party	Candidate	Votes	%
Republican	Wayne Christian (incumbent)	574,573	65.04%
Republican	Sarah Stogner	308,859	34.96%
Total votes		883,432	100.0%

==== Democratic primary ====
===== Candidates =====
- Luke Warford, former staffer for the Texas Democratic Party

===== Results =====
Democratic primary results
Party	Candidate	Votes	%
Democratic	Luke Warford	916,650	100.0%
Total votes		916,650	100.0%

==== Libertarian convention ====
===== Candidates =====
- Jaime Diez

==== Green convention ====
===== Candidates =====
- Hunter Crow

==== General election ====
===== Polling =====
Poll source	Date(s) administered	Sample size	Margin of error	Wayne Christian (R)	Luke Warford (D)	Other	Undecided
Texas Hispanic Policy Foundation	September 6–15, 2022	1,172 (LV)	± 2.9%	44%	37%	5% (Note: Díez with 4%; Crow with 1%)	14%
Data for Progress (D) (Note: This poll was sponsored by Warford's campaign)	August 17–22, 2022	636 (LV)	± 4.0%	48%	44%	–	10%

===== Results =====
2022 Texas Railroad Commissioner election
Party	Candidate	Votes	%	±%
Republican	Wayne Christian (incumbent)	4,401,187	55.37%	+2.30%
Democratic	Luke Warford	3,222,305	40.54%	+2.16%
Libertarian	Jaime Díez	239,489	3.01%	−2.27%
Green	Hunter Crow	85,570	1.08%	−2.20%
Total votes		7,948,551	100.0%	
Republican hold				

== Judicial ==
=== Supreme Court ===
Three of the nine positions of the Supreme Court of Texas were up for election. Justices are elected to six-year renewable terms with no term limit.

==== Place 3 ====
2022 Texas Supreme Court Place 3 election
- November 8, 2022
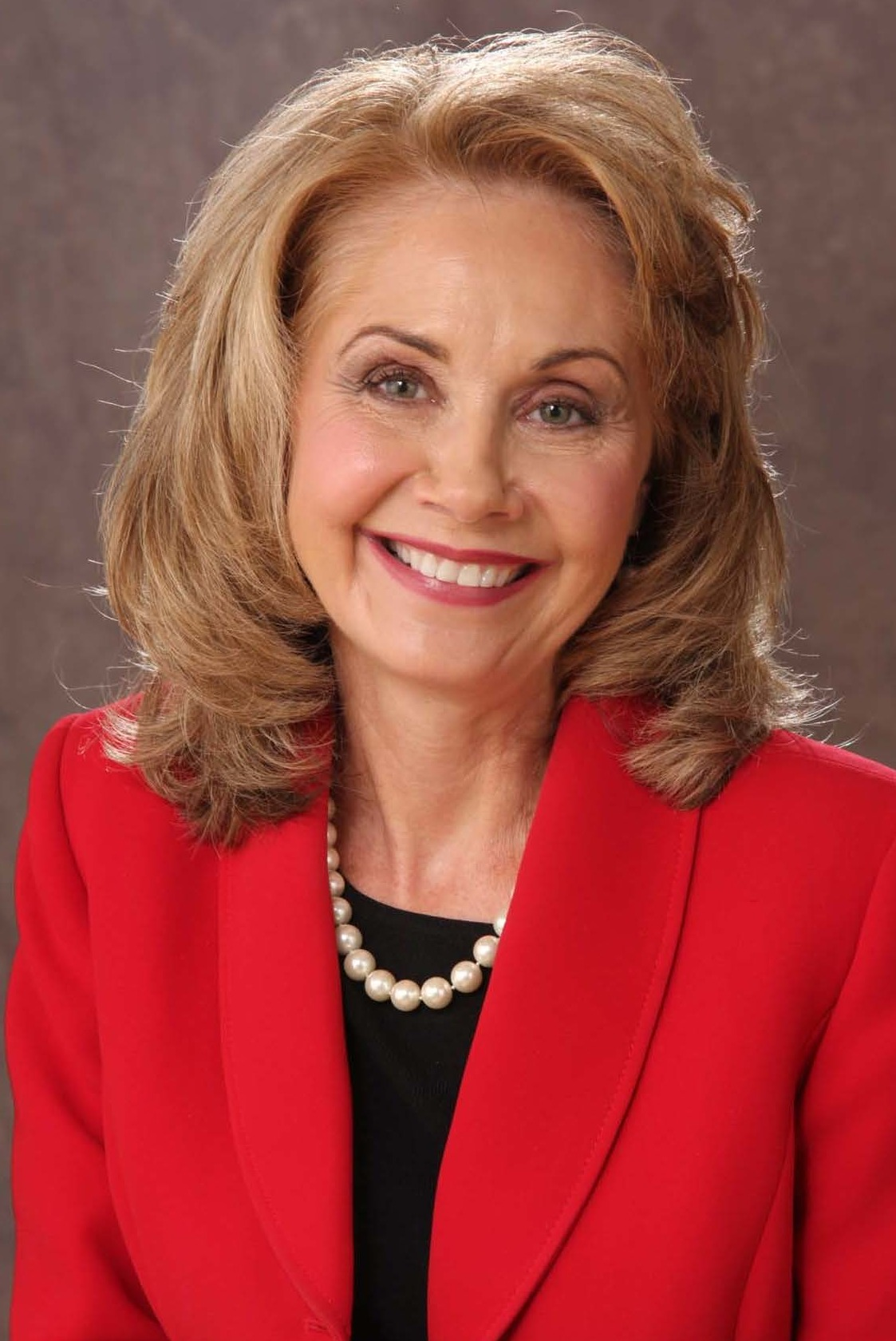

Nominee	Debra Lehrmann	Erin Nowell
Party	Republican	Democratic
Popular vote	4,475,136	3,330,529
Percentage	56.2%	41.8%
- Lehrmann: 40–50% 50–60% 60–70% 70–80% 80–90% >90% Nowell: 40–50% 50–60% 60–70% 70–80% 80–90% >90% Tie: 40–50% 50% No votes
Justice before election
Debra Lehrmann
Republican
Elected Justice
Debra Lehrmann
Republican

Incumbent Justice Debra Lehrmann ran for re-election to a third term. She was re-elected in 2016 with 53.1% of the vote.

===== Republican primary =====
====== Candidates ======
- Debra Lehrmann, incumbent Associate Justice

====== Results ======
Republican primary results
Party	Candidate	Votes	%
Republican	Debra Lehrmann (incumbent)	1,535,581	100.0%
Total votes		1,535,581	100.0%

===== Democratic primary =====
====== Candidates ======
- Erin A. Nowell, incumbent Associate Justice of the Fifth Court of Appeals of Texas

====== Results ======
Democratic primary results
Party	Candidate	Votes	%
Democratic	Erin A. Nowell	914,184	100.0%
Total votes		914,184	100.0%

===== General election =====
====== Results ======
2022 Texas Supreme Court Place 3 election
Party	Candidate	Votes	%	±%
Republican	Debra Lehrmann (incumbent)	4,475,136	56.17%	+3.10%
Democratic	Erin A. Nowell	3,330,529	41.80%	+3.42%
Libertarian	Tom Oxford	162,036	2.03%	−3.25%
Total votes		7,967,701	100.0%	
Republican hold				

==== Place 5 ====
2022 Texas Supreme Court Place 5 election
- November 8, 2022

Nominee	Rebeca Huddle	Amanda Reichek
Party	Republican	Democratic
Popular vote	4,530,668	3,406,054
Percentage	57.1%	42.9%
- Huddle: 50–60% 60–70% 70–80% 80–90% >90% Reichek: 50–60% 60–70% 70–80% 80–90% >90% Tie: 50% No votes
Justice before election
Rebeca Huddle
Republican
Elected Justice
Rebeca Huddle
Republican

Incumbent Justice Rebeca Huddle ran for election to a full term. She was appointed by Greg Abbott in 2020 to replace retiring justice Paul W. Green.

===== Republican primary =====
====== Candidates ======
- Rebeca Huddle, incumbent Associate Justice

====== Results ======
Republican primary results
Party	Candidate	Votes	%
Republican	Rebeca Huddle (incumbent)	1,519,069	100.0%
Total votes		1,519,069	100.0%

===== Democratic primary =====
====== Candidates ======
- Amanda Reichek, incumbent Associate Justice of the Fifth Court of Appeals of Texas

====== Results ======
Democratic primary results
Party	Candidate	Votes	%
Democratic	Amanda Reichek	913,836	100.0%
Total votes		913,836	100.0%

===== General election =====
====== Results ======
2022 Texas Supreme Court Place 5 election
Party	Candidate	Votes	%	±%
Republican	Rebeca Huddle (incumbent)	4,530,668	57.08%	+2.78%
Democratic	Amanda Reichek	3,406,054	42.92%	+1.74%
Total votes		7,936,722	100.0%	
Republican hold				

==== Place 9 ====
2022 Texas Supreme Court Place 9 election
- November 8, 2022

Nominee	Evan Young	Julia Maldonado
Party	Republican	Democratic
Popular vote	4,474,900	3,458,103
Percentage	56.4%	43.6%
- Young: 50–60% 60–70% 70–80% 80–90% >90% Maldonado: 50–60% 60–70% 70–80% 80–90% >90% Tie: 50% No votes
Justice before election
Evan Young
Republican
Elected Justice
Evan Young
Republican

Incumbent Republican justice Evan Young ran for election to a full term. He was appointed by Greg Abbott in 2021 to replace Justice Eva Guzman, who retired to run for attorney general.

===== Republican primary =====
====== Candidates ======
- David Schenck, incumbent Associate Justice of the Fifth Court of Appeals of Texas
- Evan A. Young, incumbent Associate Justice

====== Results ======
Republican primary results
Party	Candidate	Votes	%
Republican	Evan A. Young (incumbent)	860,852	54.86%
Republican	David Schenck	708,359	45.14%
Total votes		1,569,211	100.0%

===== Democratic primary =====
====== Candidates ======
- Julia Maldonado, Judge of the Harris County District Court (507th District)

====== Results ======
Democratic primary results
Party	Candidate	Votes	%
Democratic	Julia Maldonado	922,595	100.0%
Total votes		922,595	100.0%

===== General election =====
====== Results ======
2022 Texas Supreme Court Place 9 election
Party	Candidate	Votes	%	±%
Republican	Evan A. Young (incumbent)	4,474,900	56.41%	+0.61%
Democratic	Julia Maldonado	3,458,103	43.59%	+4.23%
Total votes		7,933,003	100.0%	
Republican hold				

=== Court of Criminal Appeals ===
Three of the nine positions of the Texas Court of Criminal Appeals were up for election. Justices are elected to six-year renewable terms with no term limit.

==== Place 2 ====
2022 Texas Court of Criminal Appeals Place 2 election
- November 8, 2022
Nominee	Mary Lou Keel
Party	Republican
Popular vote	Unopposed
Judge before election
Mary Lou Keel
Republican
Elected Judge
Mary Lou Keel
Republican

Incumbent Republican Judge Mary Lou Keel ran for re-election to a second term. She was first elected in 2016 with 54.9% of the vote.

===== Republican primary =====
====== Candidates ======
- Mary Lou Keel, incumbent Judge

====== Results ======
Republican primary results
Party	Candidate	Votes	%
Republican	Mary Lou Keel (incumbent)	1,485,583	100.0%
Total votes		1,485,583	100.0%

===== General election =====
====== Results ======
2022 Texas Court of Criminal Appeals Place 2 election
Party	Candidate	Votes	%	±%
Republican	Mary Lou Keel (incumbent)	Unopposed		
Total votes				
Republican hold				

==== Place 5 ====
2022 Texas Court of Criminal Appeals Place 5 election
- November 8, 2022

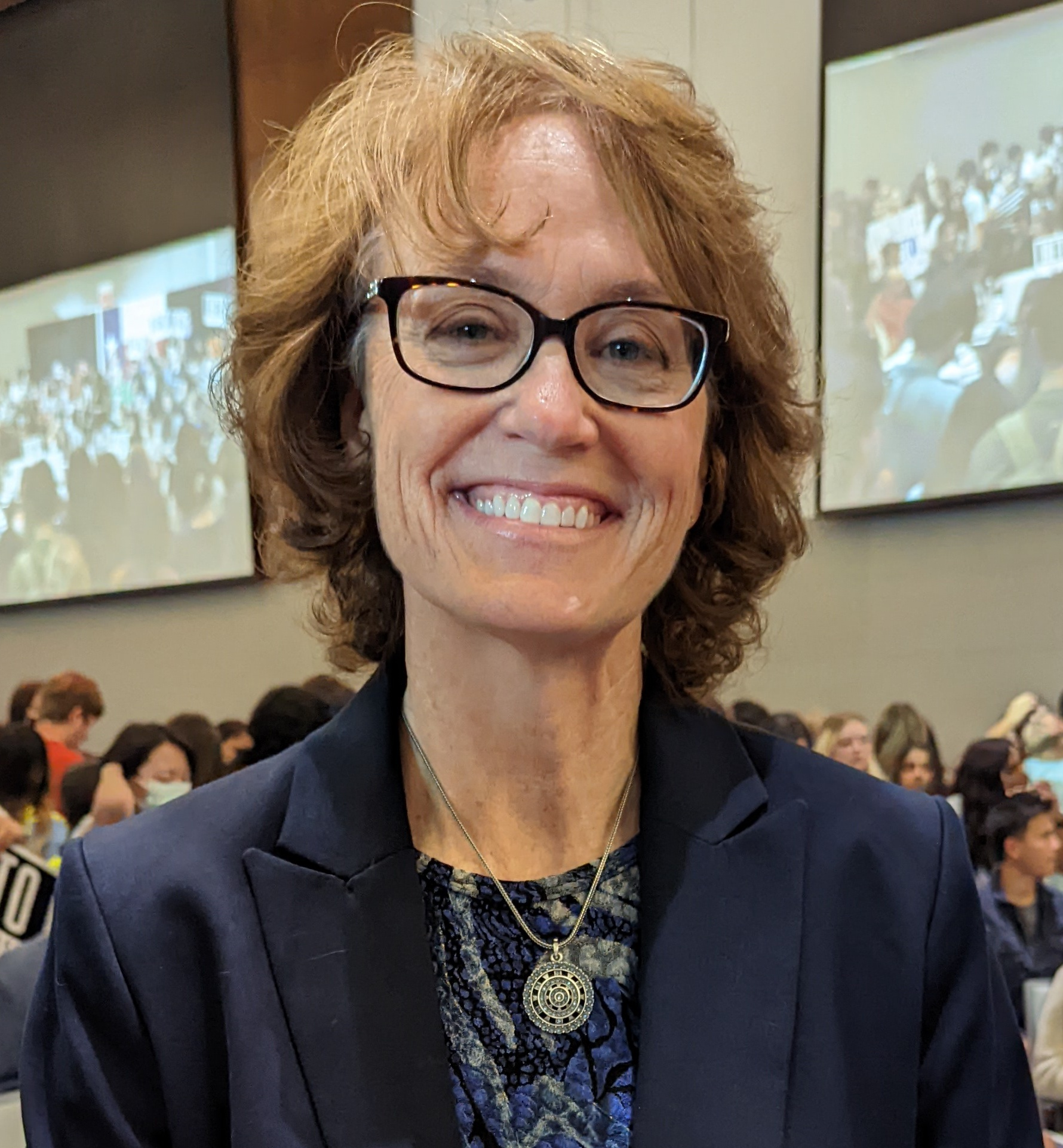
Nominee	Scott Walker	Dana Huffman
Party	Republican	Democratic
Popular vote	4,513,500	3,413,071
Percentage	56.9%	43.1%
- Walker: 50–60% 60–70% 70–80% 80–90% >90% Huffman: 50–60% 60–70% 70–80% 80–90% >90% Tie: 50% No votes
Judge before election
Scott Walker
Republican
Elected Judge
Scott Walker
Republican

Incumbent Republican Judge Scott Walker ran for re-election to a second term. He was first elected in 2016 with 54.7% of the vote.

===== Republican primary =====
====== Candidates ======
- Clint Morgan, Harris County assistant district attorney
- Scott Walker, incumbent Judge

====== Results ======
Republican primary results
Party	Candidate	Votes	%
Republican	Scott Walker (incumbent)	884,160	56.62%
Republican	Clint Morgan	677,504	43.38%
Total votes		1,561,664	100.0%

===== Democratic primary =====
====== Candidates ======
- Dana Huffman, Dallas County magistrate judge

====== Results ======
Democratic primary results
Party	Candidate	Votes	%
Democratic	Dana Huffman	911,472	100.0%
Total votes		911,472	100.0%

===== General election =====
====== Results ======
2022 Texas Court of Criminal Appeals Place 5 election
Party	Candidate	Votes	%	±%
Republican	Scott Walker (incumbent)	4,513,500	56.94%	+2.19%
Democratic	Dana Huffman	3,413,071	43.06%	+2.85%
Total votes		7,926,571	100.0%	
Republican hold				

==== Place 6 ====
2022 Texas Court of Criminal Appeals Place 6 election
- November 8, 2022

Nominee	Jesse McClure	Robert Johnson
Party	Republican	Democratic
Popular vote	4,526,307	3,383,705
Percentage	57.2%	42.8%
- McClure: 50–60% 60–70% 70–80% 80–90% >90% Johnson: 50–60% 60–70% 70–80% 80–90% >90% Tie: 50% No votes
Judge before election
Jesse McClure
Republican
Elected Judge
Jesse McClure
Republican

Incumbent Republican Judge Jesse McClure ran for election to a full term. He was appointed by Greg Abbott in 2021 to replace Michael Keasler, who reached mandatory retirement when he turned 75 years old in 2017.

===== Republican primary =====
====== Candidates ======
- Jesse McClure, incumbent Judge

====== Results ======
Republican primary results
Party	Candidate	Votes	%
Republican	Jesse McClure (incumbent)	1,474,886	100.0%
Total votes		1,474,886	100.0%

===== Democratic primary =====
====== Candidates ======
- Robert Johnson, Judge of the Harris County District Court (177th District)

====== Results ======
Democratic primary results
Party	Candidate	Votes	%
Democratic	Robert Johnson	906,119	100.0%
Total votes		906,119	100.0%

===== General election =====
====== Results ======
2022 Texas Court of Criminal Appeals Place 6 election
Party	Candidate	Votes	%	±%
Republican	Jesse McClure (incumbent)	4,526,307	57.22%	+2.24%
Democratic	Robert Johnson	3,383,705	42.78%	+1.89%
Total votes		7,910,012	100.0%	
Republican hold				

== Board of education ==
All fifteen seats of the Texas Board of Education were up for election to four-year terms. The board follows a 2-4-4 term system; members are elected to two-year terms at the beginning of each decade. Prior to the election, the board was made up of nine Republicans and six Democrats.

=== District 1 ===
==== Republican primary ====
Republican primary results
Party	Candidate	Votes	%
Republican	Michael Stevens	39,848	63.7
Republican	Lani Popp	22,686	36.3
Total votes		62,534	100.0

==== Democratic primary ====
Democratic primary results
Party	Candidate	Votes	%
Democratic	Melissa Ortega	42,212	46.1
Democratic	Laura Marquez	32,523	35.5
Democratic	Omar Yanar	16,817	18.4
Total votes		91,552	100.0

Democratic primary runoff results
Party	Candidate	Votes	%
Democratic	Melissa Ortega	31,583	57.5
Democratic	Laura Marquez	23,335	42.5
Total votes		54,918	100.0

==== General election ====
2022 Texas Board of Education 1st district election
Party	Candidate	Votes	%	±%
Democratic	Melissa Ortega	247,093	55.79%	+0.02
Republican	Michael Stevens	195,794	44.21%	−0.02
Total votes		442,887	100.00%	
Democratic hold				

=== District 2 ===
==== Republican primary ====
Republican primary results
Party	Candidate	Votes	%
Republican	LJ Francis	37,909	57.5
Republican	Hilda Garza-DeShazo	28,046	42.5
Total votes		65,955	100.0

==== Democratic primary ====
Democratic primary results
Party	Candidate	Votes	%
Democratic	Victor Perez	21,594	29.6
Democratic	Pete Garcia	17,767	24.4
Democratic	Thomas Garcia	15,216	20.9
Democratic	Michael Vargas	14,437	19.8
Democratic	Wayne Raasch	3,934	5.4
Total votes		72,948	100.0

Democratic primary runoff results
Party	Candidate	Votes	%
Democratic	Victor Perez	20,649	56.1
Democratic	Pete Garcia	16,150	43.9
Total votes		36,799	100.0

==== General election ====
2022 Texas Board of Education 2nd district election
Party	Candidate	Votes	%	±%
Republican	LJ Francis	194,976	50.18%	+3.78
Democratic	Victor Perez	193,578	49.82%	−3.78
Total votes		388,554	100.00%	
Republican gain from Democratic				

=== Member, District 3 ===
==== Republican primary ====
Republican primary results
Party	Candidate	Votes	%
Republican	Ken Morrow	42,267	55.9%
Republican	Lana Jean Holland	33,297	44.1%
Total votes		75,564	100%

==== Democratic primary ====
Democratic primary results
Party	Candidate	Votes	%
Democratic	Marisa Perez-Diaz (incumbent)	77,313	100%
Total votes		77,313	100%

==== General election ====
General election results
Party	Candidate	Votes	%	±%
Democratic	Marisa Perez-Diaz (incumbent)	258,122	54.92%	−45.08
Republican	Ken Morrow	211,906	45.08%	+45.08
Total votes		470,028	100.00%	

=== Member, District 4 ===
==== Democratic primary ====
Democratic primary results
Party	Candidate	Votes	%
Democratic	Caretta Mallet-Fontenot	26,418	38.7%
Democratic	Staci Childs	19,108	28.0%
Democratic	Marvin Johnson	10,231	15.0%
Democratic	Theldon Branch	7,415	10.9%
Democratic	Larry McKinzie	5,025	7.4%
Total votes		68,197	100%

Democratic primary runoff results
Party	Candidate	Votes	%
Democratic	Staci Childs	17,472	57.4%
Democratic	Coretta Mallet-Fontenot	12,980	42.6%
Total votes		30,452	100%

==== General election ====
General election results
Party	Candidate	Votes	%	±%
Democratic	Staci Childs		100%	
Total votes			100%	

=== Member, District 5 ===
==== Republican primary ====
Republican primary results
Party	Candidate	Votes	%
Republican	Mark Loewe	38,777	53.4%
Republican	Robert Morrow	33,775	46.6%
Total votes		72,552	100%

==== Democratic primary ====
Democratic primary results
Party	Candidate	Votes	%
Democratic	Rebecca Bell-Metereau (incumbent)	91,054	73.7%
Democratic	Juan Juárez	24,514	19.8%
Democratic	Kevin Guico	8,018	6.5%
Total votes		123,586	100%

==== General election ====
General election results
Party	Candidate	Votes	%	±%
Democratic	Rebecca Bell-Metereau (incumbent)	419,391	63.82%	+14.88
Republican	Mark Loewe	237,773	36.18%	–10.97
Total votes		657,164	100.00%	

=== Member, District 6 ===
==== Republican primary ====
Republican primary results
Party	Candidate	Votes	%
Republican	Will Hickman (incumbent)	71,825	65.8%
Republican	Mike Wolfe	37,336	34.2%
Total votes		109,161	100%

==== Democratic primary ====
Democratic primary results
Party	Candidate	Votes	%
Democratic	Michelle Palmer	51,360	100%
Total votes		51,360	100%

==== General election ====
General election results
Party	Candidate	Votes	%	±%
Republican	Will Hickman (incumbent)	364,447	60.25%	+10.49
Democratic	Michelle Palmer	240,384	39.74%	–7.64
Write-in		59	0.01%	N/A
Total votes		604,890	100%	

=== Member, District 7 ===
==== Republican primary ====
Republican primary results
Party	Candidate	Votes	%
Republican	Julie Pickren	66,229	50.52%
Republican	Michael Barton	41,349	31.54%
Republican	Danny Surman	19,096	14.57%
Republican	Abolaji Tijani "Ayo" Ayobami	4,415	3.37%
Total votes		131,089	100%

==== Democratic primary ====
Democratic primary results
Party	Candidate	Votes	%
Democratic	Dan Hochman	58,897	100%
Total votes		58,897	100%

==== General election ====
General election results
Party	Candidate	Votes	%	±%
Republican	Julie Pickren	346,419	60.56%	+1.11
Democratic	Dan Hochman	213,742	37.37%	–3.18
Libertarian	Rebekah Plourde	11,835	2.07%	N/A
Total votes		571,996	100%	

=== Member, District 8 ===
==== Republican primary ====
Republican primary results
Party	Candidate	Votes	%
Republican	Audrey Young (incumbent)	94,705	100%
Total votes		94,705	100%

==== General election ====
General election results
Party	Candidate	Votes	%	±%
Republican	Audrey Young (incumbent)	313,220	71.38%	–2.05
Libertarian	Rhett Rosenquest Smith	125,616	28.62%	+2.05
Total votes		438,836	100%	

=== Member, District 9 ===
==== Republican primary ====
Republican primary results
Party	Candidate	Votes	%
Republican	Keven Ellis	135,023	100%
Total votes		135,023	100%

==== General election ====
General election results
Party	Candidate	Votes	%
Republican	Keven Ellis (incumbent)		
Total votes			100%

=== Member, District 10 ===
==== Republican primary ====
Republican primary results
Party	Candidate	Votes	%
Republican	Tom Maynard (incumbent)	168,646	100%
Total votes		168,646	100%

==== General election ====
General election results
Party	Candidate	Votes	%
Republican	Tom Maynard (incumbent)		
Total votes			100%

==== Democratic primary ====
Democratic primary results
Party	Candidate	Votes	%
Democratic	Luis Miguel Sifuentes	25,401	47.24%
Democratic	James Whitfield	18,104	33.67%
Democratic	"DC" Caldwell I	10,261	19.08%
Total votes		53,766	100%

- James Whitfield dropped out of the primary runoff, allowing Sifuentes to become the nominee.

==== General election ====
General election results
Party	Candidate	Votes	%	±%
Republican	Patricia "Pat" Hardy (incumbent)	390,046	63.28%	+6.12
Democratic	Luis Miguel Sifuentes	226,183	36.69%	–3.77
Write-in		176	0.03%	N/A
Total votes		616,405	100%	

=== Member, District 12 ===
==== Republican primary ====
Republican primary results
Party	Candidate	Votes	%
Republican	Pam Little (incumbent)	121,622	100%
Total votes		121,622	100%

Democratic primary results
Party	Candidate	Votes	%
Democratic	Alex Cornwallis	28,985	51.4%
Democratic	Roberto Velasco	27,403	48.6%
Total votes		56,388	100%

==== General election ====
General election results
Party	Candidate	Votes	%	±%
Republican	Pam Little (incumbent)	400,089	61.03%	+11.60
Democratic	Alex Cornwallis	236,589	36.09%	–11.82
Libertarian	Christy Mowrey	18,671	2.85%	+0.19
Write-in		219	0.03%	N/A
Total votes		655,568	100%	

=== Member, District 13 ===
==== Democratic primary ====
Democratic primary results
Party	Candidate	Votes	%
Democratic	Aicha Davis (incumbent)	87,947	100%
Total votes		87,947	100%

==== Republican primary ====
Republican primary results
Party	Candidate	Votes	%
Republican	Kathryn Monette	9,111	30.00%
Republican	A. Denise Russell	8,910	29.34%
Republican	Natalie Kohn	7,082	23.32%
Republican	Ajua Mason	5,267	17.34%
Total votes		30,370	100%

Republican primary runoff results
Party	Candidate	Votes	%
Republican	Kathryn Monette	9,915	64.67%
Republican	A. Denise Russell	5,416	35.33%
Total votes		15,331	100%

==== General election ====
General election results
Party	Candidate	Votes	%	±%
Democratic	Aicha Davis (incumbent)	275,226	72.27%	–4.05
Republican	Kathryn Monette	105,595	27.73%	+4.05
Total votes		380,821	100%	

=== Member, District 14 ===
==== Republican primary ====
Republican primary results
Party	Candidate	Votes	%
Republican	Evelyn Brooks	77,805	57.22%
Republican	Sue Melton-Malone (incumbent)	58,161	42.78%
Total votes		135,966	100%

==== Democratic primary ====
Democratic primary results
Party	Candidate	Votes	%
Democratic	Tracy Fisher	40,860	100%
Total votes		40,860	100%

==== General election ====
General election results
Party	Candidate	Votes	%	±%
Republican	Evelyn Brooks	399,567	64.73%	–3.08
Democratic	Tracy Fisher	217,669	35.27%	+3.08
Total votes		617,236	100%	

=== Member, District 15 ===
==== Republican primary ====
Republican primary results
Party	Candidate	Votes	%
Republican	Aaron Kinsey	83,096	52.23%
Republican	Jay Johnson (incumbent)	75,997	47.77%
Total votes		159,093	100%

==== General election ====
General election results
Party	Candidate	Votes	%	±%
Republican	Aaron Kinsey		100%	
Total votes			100%	

== Legislature ==
All 150 seats of the Texas House of Representatives and all 31 seats of the Texas State Senate were up for election. The winners of this election served in the 88th Texas Legislature.

=== Senate ===
All 31 seats of the Texas Senate were up for election to two-year terms. Prior to the election, Republicans held a majority of 18 seats against the Democrats' 13 seats.

Texas Senate
Party	Leader	Before	After	Change
Republican	Donna Campbell	18	19	▲1
Democratic	John Whitmire	13	12	▼1
Total		31	31	

=== House of Representatives ===
All 150 seats of the Texas House of Representatives were up for election to two-year terms. Prior to the election, Republicans held a majority of 85 seats against the Democrats' 65 seats.

Texas House of Representatives
Party	Leader	Before	After	Change
Republican	Dade Phelan	85	86	▲1
Democratic	Chris Turner	65	64	▼1
Total		150	150	

== See also ==
- 2022 United States elections

== Notes ==
Partisan clients
