= Lists of law clerks of the Supreme Court of the United States =

The lists of law clerks of the Supreme Court of the United States cover the law clerks who have assisted the justices of the Supreme Court of the United States in various capacities since the first one was hired by Justice Horace Gray in 1882. The list is divided into separate lists for each position in the Supreme Court.

Each justice is permitted to have three or four law clerks per Court term. Most clerks are recent law school graduates, who have typically graduated at the top of their class and spent at least one year clerking for a lower federal judge. Among their many functions, clerks do legal research that assists justices in deciding what cases to accept and what questions to ask during oral arguments, prepare memoranda, and draft orders and opinions. Research suggests that clerks exert a moderate influence on how justices vote in cases, but have "substantial influence in cases that are high-profile, legally significant, or close decisions".

== Current justices ==
The justices as of 2023 with links to their past and present law clerks:

- John Roberts (clerks)
- Brett Kavanaugh (clerks)
- Ketanji Brown Jackson (clerks)
- Sonia Sotomayor (clerks)
- Elena Kagan (clerks)
- Amy Coney Barrett (clerks)
- Samuel Alito (clerks)
- Neil Gorsuch (clerks)
- Clarence Thomas (clerks)

== Lists by seat ==
- List of law clerks for the chief justice of the United States
  Clerks for chief justices:
Morrison Waite • Melville Fuller • Edward D. White • William H. Taft • Charles E. Hughes • Harlan F. Stone • Fred M. Vinson • Earl Warren • Warren Burger • William Rehnquist • John Roberts
- List of law clerks for the first seat of the Supreme Court of the United States
  Clerks for associate justices:
Samuel Blatchford • Edward D. White • Willis Van Devanter • Hugo Black • Lewis Powell • Anthony Kennedy • Brett Kavanaugh
- List of law clerks for the second seat of the Supreme Court of the United States
  Clerks for associate justices:
Horace Gray • Oliver W. Holmes • Benjamin Cardozo • Felix Frankfurter • Arthur Goldberg • Abe Fortas • Harry Blackmun • Stephen Breyer • Ketanji Brown Jackson
- List of law clerks for the third seat of the Supreme Court of the United States
  Clerks for associate justices:
William Woods • Lucius Lamar II • Howell Jackson • Rufus Peckham • Horace Lurton • James McReynolds • James Byrnes • Wiley Rutledge • Sherman Minton • William Brennan • David Souter • Sonia Sotomayor
- List of law clerks for the fourth seat of the Supreme Court of the United States
  Clerks for associate justices:
Samuel Miller • Henry Brown • William Moody • Joseph Lamar • Louis Brandeis • William O. Douglas • John P. Stevens • Elena Kagan
- List of law clerks for the sixth seat of the Supreme Court of the United States
  Clerks for associate justices:
Stanley Matthews • David Brewer • Charles E. Hughes • John Clarke • George Sutherland • Stanley Reed • Charles Whittaker • Byron White • Ruth Bader Ginsburg • Amy Coney Barrett
- List of law clerks for the eighth seat of the Supreme Court of the United States
  Clerks for associate justices:
John M. Harlan • Mahlon Pitney • Edward Sanford • Owen Roberts • Harold Burton • Potter Stewart • Sandra Day O'Connor • Samuel Alito
- List of law clerks for the ninth seat of the Supreme Court of the United States
  Clerks for associate justices:
Stephen Field • Joseph McKenna • Harlan Stone • Robert Jackson • John M. Harlan • William Rehnquist • Antonin Scalia • Neil Gorsuch
- List of law clerks for the tenth seat of the Supreme Court of the United States
  Clerks for associate justices:
Joseph Bradley • George Shiras • William Day • Pierce Butler • Frank Murphy • Tom Clark • Thurgood Marshall • Clarence Thomas

Note: There are no official numbers for the individual seats of associate justice. The numbering of associate justice seats 1–4 reflects the order of precedence of the inaugural justices to occupy those seats, which was based upon the seniority of their commission from President George Washington following their confirmation by the U.S. Senate. The fifth original associate justice seat, and the simultaneously created seventh and eighth seats, are numbered according to the order in which each seat's first occupant received their commission from the president following Senate confirmation. Seats six, nine, and 10 are numbered according to the order in which each was created by statute. Also, due to the several changes in the size of the Court since it was established in 1789, two seats have been abolished, both as a result of the Judicial Circuits Act of 1866 (and before the Court established the practice of hiring law clerks). Consequently, neither "seat 5" nor "seat 7" has a list article. Also, the seat numbers in these articles are not derived from official United States federal government sources, but are used as a way of organizing and detailing the succession of justices over the years since the first set of justices were confirmed by the United States Senate.

== Notable clerks ==
- First female: Lucile Lomen (1941) from 1944
- First Orthodox Jewish male: Louis Henkin in 1946
- First African American male: William Thaddeus Coleman Jr. in 1948
- First African American female: Karen Hastie Williams in 1974
- First Hispanic American female: Anna Durand in 1983
- First South Asian male: Vikram Amar in 1989
- First Hispanic American male (Chief Justice of the United States): Ted Cruz in 1996
- First Orthodox Jewish female: Rochelle Lee Shoretz in 1998
- First Vietnamese American male to clerk for two Justices: Joseph T. Thai in 2000
- First Asian American female: Neomi Rao in 2001
- First blind male: Isaac Lidsky in 2008
- First female of Native Hawaiian ancestry: Kamaile A. Nichols (Turčan) in 2016
- First Native American (Chickasaw): Tobi Merritt Edwards Young in 2018
- First blind female: Laura Wolk in 2019
