= Samuel S. Losh =

American singer

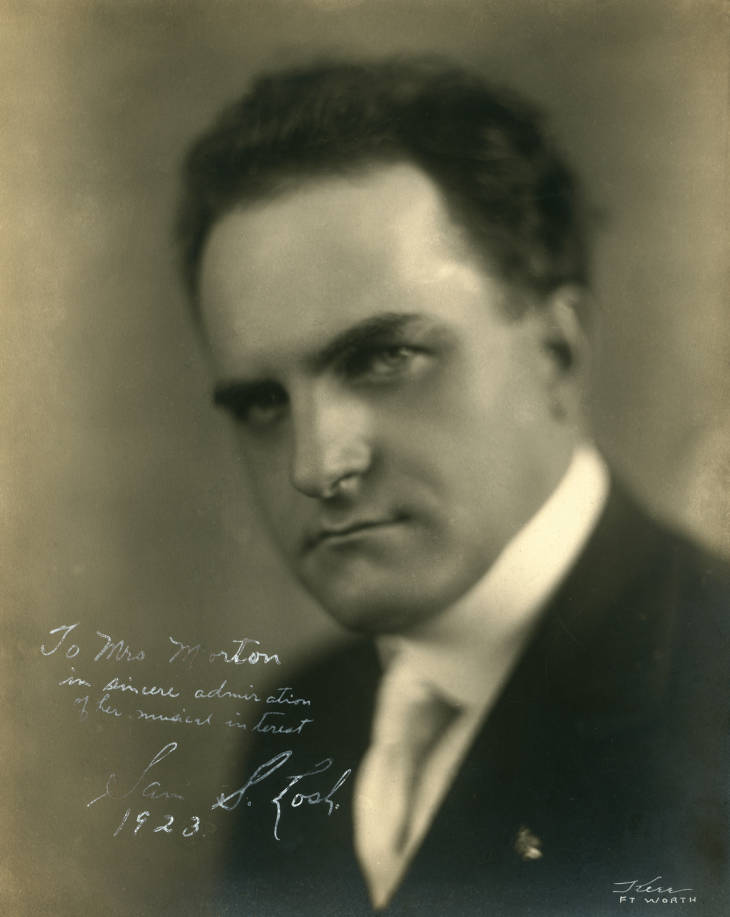
- Samuel S. Losh in 1923
- Born: October 4, 1884; Perry County, Pennsylvania
- Died: June 3, 1943 (aged 58); Fort Worth, Texas
- Burial place: Mount Olivet Cemetery (Fort Worth, Texas)
- Education: Leipzig Conservatory of Music
- Occupations: composer; vocalist; educator

Samuel S. Losh (1884–1943) was a vocalist, composer and music educator in Fort Worth, Texas.

== Biography ==
=== Early life and education ===
Samuel S. Losh was born in the community of Lebo in Perry County, Pennsylvania on October 4, 1884. His middle initial has been said to stand for various names including Stephen, Simpson, and even Socrates. He was one of five children born to Charles Silverius Losh (1852-before 1910) and Alice Tamar Wagner Losh (1861–1914), both natives of Pennsylvania. The family moved to Hagerstown, Maryland, where Losh graduated from high school in 1902. As a baritone and pianist, Losh moved to Germany to study at the Leipzig Conservatory of Music in 1904–1905.

=== Music career ===
Losh returned to the United States, working as director of music at Catawba College in Newton, North Carolina from 1905 to 1908. He relocated to Texas to teach music at Texas Christian University for the 1910–1911 academic year, when the school moved from Waco to Fort Worth; he stayed in Fort Worth for the remainder of his life, despite resigning from TCU after only one year. Despite receiving job offers from Catawba College, Baylor University, and Oklahoma Christian University, Losh began teaching private vocal and piano lessons and opened his own school, the Losh Institute of Music and Expression, in 1912. When Losh married, his wife also taught and helped run the school. It remained in operation until his death in 1943, with locations in the Continental Bank Building, the Mutual Home Building, and finally the Losh residence.

In 1915, Losh spoke at the first meeting of the Texas Music Teachers' Association in Dallas, and was elected to its executive board along with fellow Fort Worth musicians E. Clyde Whitlock and Andrew Hemphill. He also wrote about local music for the Fort Worth Star-Telegram newspaper.

In 1916, Losh began a long-running series of community singalong events for residents of Fort Worth and surrounding rural areas, saying that the events were community affairs and "the Fort Worth community does not stop at the city limits." Local Civil War veterans were invited to lead some of the songs, many of which were old Confederate songs with racist overtones. Promoting the community singalongs, Losh aimed at uniting local citizens, saying that, "A band is the greatest peace maker a city can possess."

Losh took his group singalong concept to the U.S. Army, which then operated Camp Bowie, a World War I training camp on the west side of Fort Worth. In 1917–18, Losh was appointed the camp's official song leader and vice chair of the War Service Board music committee by the War Department, providing vocal lessons to soldiers as an attempt to boost morale and keep troops fit for battle. Inmates of Camp Bowie's detention camp also had their own singalongs led by Losh, in addition to the inmates' jazz band. Losh led similar singing programs at other local military installations, including Love Field and Camp John Dick in Dallas. In 1917, Losh was mugged by hitchhiking soldiers he had picked up to drive back to Camp Bowie. In 1918, he organized drives to collect old sheet music for the soldiers in the camp.

Losh's singalong success in Fort Worth and at army camps led to larger events, some with attendance as high as 8,000, as well as singing engagements in at Texas Christian University, chambers of commerce, movie theaters, club meetings, and local department stores. In 1921, he became the director of the Trinity Episcopal Church choir; in 1922 he began a long-running series of performances broadcast nationally on Fort Worth's WBAP radio. His leadership of the Fort Worth Municipal Opera was widely praised, although short-lived as local productions ceased in 1929 due to the Great Depression.

=== Personal life ===
Losh's father died in Pennsylvania between 1900 and 1910, and his mother moved to Fort Worth in order to be near her family. She died in Fort Worth in 1914. Losh's brother, Seibert Losh, was a noted builder of pipe organs who lived in Hershey, Pennsylvania, known for building the pipe organs for the New York Hippodrome, the chapel at West Point, and the Philadelphia Opera House. A sister, Katharyn Losh, also lived in Fort Worth.

Samuel S. Losh married fellow music teacher Ada May Hogan in October 1923, surprising friends and family unaware of a courtship. The wedding, held at Broadway Presbyterian Church, included a performance of Losh's composition, "O Perfect Love," and a wedding march played by William J. Marsh, composer of the state song of Texas. The couple lived in Fort Worth's Oakhurst neighborhood from 1937 to Losh's death in 1943, and their former home still has a stained glass window reading "Losh."

Losh was involved in numerous civic groups and charities. He was a supporter of Fort Worth's Union Gospel Mission and served on the board of the Fort Worth Symphony Orchestra. He was a Rotarian and served as president of the Fort Worth Rotary Club for a number of years; he led members in a singalong at an international Rotary convention in Brussels. He also led the Moslah Shrine Chanters, a choir composed of Fort Worth Shriners, and served as president of the local Lions Club.

Losh was a longtime member of Hemphill Presbyterian Church. After suffering two heart attacks in rapid succession, Losh died at home on June 3, 1943 and was buried at Mount Olivet Cemetery in Fort Worth.
