= Charlie Baird =

American judge

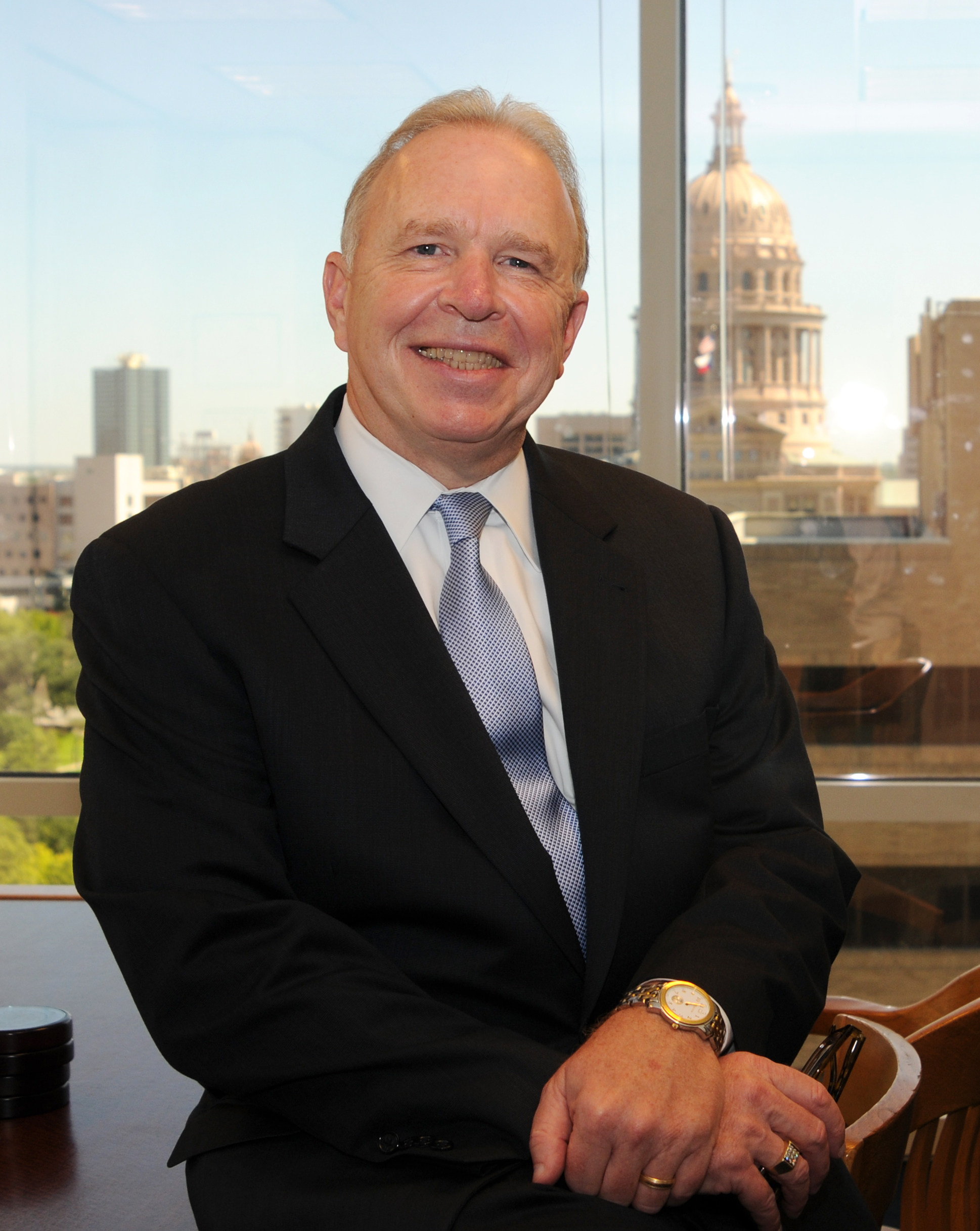
- Charlie Baird

Associate Judge of the Texas Court of Criminal Appeals
- In office January 2, 1991 – January 1, 1999
- Succeeded by: Michael Keasler

299th Criminal District Court Judge of Travis County, Texas
- In office January 1, 2007 – January 1, 2011
- Preceded by: Jon Wisser
- Succeeded by: Karen Sage

Personal details
- Born: 1955 (age 70–71) Gilmer, Texas, U.S.
- Party: Democratic
- Education: University Of Texas, South Texas College Of Law
- Occupation: Lawyer

Charlie Baird is an Austin, Texas criminal defense attorney and retired state district court and Texas Court of Criminal Appeals associate judge, is best known for his efforts at promoting restorative justice during his time on the bench. He is the only judge in the state of Texas to have exonerated a deceased individual, which he did in the case of Tim Cole.

== Early life ==
Charlie Baird was born and raised in Gilmer, Texas and is a 1973 graduate of Gilmer High School.

== Education ==
Baird attended Kilgore College, then transferred to The University of Texas, graduating in 1976 with a degree in business administration. After working for Congressman Ray Roberts, Baird returned to Houston and South Texas College of Law; he graduated in December 1980 and began practicing law the following spring.

Baird earned his Master of Laws in Judicial Process from The University of Virginia School of Law in 1995. In 1993, he was named the distinguished alumnus of South Texas College of Law.

== Texas Court of Criminal Appeals Service ==
After becoming disillusioned by what he viewed as a failure of some judges he practiced before to follow the law, read cases, and show some level of care about their work, Baird decided in 1989 to run for the Texas Court of Criminal Appeals in 1990.

Baird ran an aggressive statewide campaign, and was elected to the court the same year that Ann Richards defeated Clayton W. Williams, Jr., for governor.

During his two terms on the Court, Baird developed a reputation as an independent-minded jurist.

As the court began a rightward shift—first with the election of now-presiding judge Sharon Keller in 1994, Baird developed what the Austin Chronicle termed a "strong judicial voice" which increasingly became a voice of dissent during his latter years on the court.

Baird consistently wrote more opinions each year than any other judge on the court, and pushed the majority to address specific points of law through the crafting of strong and detailed opinions—often doing so even in instances where the majority would have preferred to address the cases without a written opinion.

=== Roy Criner case ===
In one of Baird's most famous dissents, he argued that Roy Criner, convicted of sexual assault in 1990, should be granted a new trial. The majority in the 5-3 decision did not favor a new trial for Criner in spite of the fact that DNA testing—newly available at the time—showed Criner was not a match for the semen found in the victim. Keller's majority opinion tried to downplay the evidence by claiming the victim may have been promiscuous and that Criner may have used a condom. Keller was forced to issue the opinion only because Baird dissented on the case, which the majority preferred to address without a written opinion.

== Interlude between judicial roles ==
After losing the 1998 General Election in a Republican landslide, Baird served as a visiting justice on the Thirteenth and Fourteenth Texas Courts of Appeals and as a judge on the criminal trial benches in Travis County. In addition, he was a visiting professor at Texas Tech University School of Law, Loyola University New Orleans School of Law, and his alma mater, South Texas College of Law where he received the Student Bar Association's Professor Excellence Award for 2004–2005 and 1999–2000. Judge Baird taught criminal law and procedure, criminal trial advocacy, capital punishment, and appellate and post-conviction remedies. And, while at Texas Tech, he supervised the students in the West Texas Innocence Project.

== 299th Criminal District Court ==
In 2005, Baird was approached by a group of Travis County attorneys encouraging him to run for the seat being vacated by Judge Jon Wisser. Baird entered and won the 2006 Democratic Party Primary and 2006 General Election in Travis County and was sworn in on January 1, 2006.

As a judge, Baird gained high marks from the press and the public for his efforts at working to rehabilitate non-violent offenders—a practice which sparked ire from the Travis County District Attorney's Office and former DA Ronnie Earle.

Baird became the first felony district judge in Travis County to use GPS tracking devices for defendants on bond awaiting trial for violent offenses, and took the lead in using alcohol-monitoring equipment for felony probationers. He worked diligently to establish relationships with businesses and job training programs to help defendants get better jobs.

=== Tim Cole case ===
In February 2009, Baird presided over hearings related to the case of Tim Cole, a Texas Tech University student convicted of raping a fellow student in 1985. The hearings in Baird's court were held after a Lubbock County judge rejected previous similar petitions in August 2008.

Cole was convicted by a jury of rape, primarily based on the testimony of the victim, Michele Mallin. He was sentenced to 25 years in prison. While incarcerated, Cole was offered parole if he would admit guilt, but he refused. Another man, Jerry Wayne Johnson, confessed to the rape in 1995. Further, Mallin later admitted that she was mistaken as to the identity of her attacker. She stated that investigators botched the gathering of evidence and withheld information from her, causing her to believe that Cole was the perpetrator. Mallin told police that the rapist smoked during the rape. However, Cole never smoked because of his severe asthma. DNA evidence later showed him to be innocent.

Cole died in prison on December 2, 1999, during an asthma attack. His family and the victim sought to clear his name.

In April 2009, Baird issued an exoneration order, noting, "to a 100 percent moral, factual and legal certainty" that Timothy Cole did not commit the rape. Baird reversed the conviction and ordered Cole's record expunged. It was the first posthumous DNA exoneration in the history of the state of Texas. Cole's exoneration led to numerous changes in Texas Law.

== Retirement and private practice ==
On January 1, 2011, Baird retired from the bench after deciding not to seek a second term on the 299th Criminal District Court and established the Criminal Law Section of the Fowler Law Firm, PC, a twenty-member firm dedicated to providing excellent representation in every area of the practice of law in Austin, Texas. In 2026, Baird was named to the Texas Criminal Defense Lawyer's Association Hall of Fame in recognition of his work.

== 2012 election ==
In June 2011, Baird told the Austin American-Statesman he was considering a run against Travis County District Attorney Rosemary Lehmberg in the 2012 Democratic Primary.

He formally launched his campaign for Travis County District Attorney on September 6, 2011, with a launch event in the theater of Austin's Millennium Youth Entertainment Complex. On Tuesday, October 25, Baird and incumbent Rosemary Lehmberg made their first joint debate appearance at the Central Texas Democratic Forum. Following the forum, the Austin Chronicle noted that the race was one of the "hottest" primary races in Travis County.

In the election in June 2012, Baird lost the primary election for Travis County District Attorney to Lehmberg, obtaining about 37% of the votes in the Democratic primary, which meant Lehmberg won re-election, since there was no Republican candidate.

== Electoral history ==
=== Democratic Primary election results ===
(Only contested primary results shown)

Primary election results 1992–2006
| Year | Democrat | Votes | Pct | Democrat | Votes | Pct |
|---|---|---|---|---|---|---|
| 1994 Democratic Primary Race For Presiding Judge, Texas Court of Criminal Appeals | Charles F. "Charlie" Baird | 375,346 | 45.47% | Mike McCormick | 450,116 | 54.52% |
| 2006 Democratic Primary Election, 299th Criminal District Court (Travis County) | Charlie Baird | 10,379 | 57.66% | Buddy Meyer | 7,620 | 42.33% |

=== General Election results ===
General Election results 1992–2006
| Year | Democrat | Votes | Pct | Republican | Votes | Pct |
|---|---|---|---|---|---|---|
| 1992 General Election, Texas Court of Criminal Appeals, Place 2 | Charlie Baird | 2,855,901 | 52.80% | Joseph A. (Joe) Devany | 2,552,601 | 47.19% |
| 1998 General Election, Texas Court of Criminal Appeals, Place 2 | Charlie Baird | 1,611,538 | 46.03% | Michael Keasler | 1,889,069 | 53.96% |
| 2006 General Election, 299th Criminal District Court (Travis County) | Charlie Baird | 134,466 | 63.26% | Madeleine Connor | 78,077 | 36.73% |
