= Helen Matusevich Oujesky =

American professor of microbiology

- Born: Helen Matusevich; August 14, 1930; Fort Worth, United States
- Died: February 1, 2010 (aged 79)
- Occupations: Teaching and research in microbiology
- Years active: 45
- Notable work: Research in the field of environmental pollution of soil and water

Helen Matusevich Oujesky (August 14, 1930 – February 1, 2010) was an American professor of microbiology at the University of Texas, San Antonio. In this capacity she actively pursued environmental research on pollution of soil and water, particularly of toxic wastes.

In her career span of 45 years in the field of education and research, Oujesky was the recipient of several awards such as from the National Science Foundation, Student Science Training Programs for High School Students, Minority Research Programs for Minority High School Students, and an Intervention Model Program for Girls Using Laboratory Activities in Science, Math and Engineering. On 30 January 1997, her name was incorporated in the Texas Women's Hall of Fame.

== Biography ==
Oujesky was born in Fort Worth, Texas on August 14, 1930. Her parents were Lilly (Krivanek) and Steve Matusevich. After her college graduation in 1951 with a bachelor's degree from the Texas State College for Women (now Texas Woman's University) she started her career as a teacher at Trimble Tech High School in Fort Worth and worked as a chemistry and biology teacher until 1963. She also pursued her higher education at Texas Christian University (TCU) and received a Master of Arts degree in 1965. She was awarded a doctoral degree from the Texas Woman's University (TWU) in 1968.

Oujesky then worked from 1963 to 1965 as a graduate teaching assistant at Texas Christian University in Fort Worth. From 1965 to 1968 she worked as graduate teacher at Texas Woman's University and as assistant professor from 1968 to 1973.

Oujesky joined the University of Texas at San Antonio in 1973 and retired as professor in 2001. She was also on the board of directors of the Texas Academy of Sciences from 1980.

Apart from presenting her research findings at various forums on applied microbial ecology and effects of environmental pollutants on microbial metabolism related to water and land pollution of toxic wastes, she has also lectured on the subject of educational equity for girls and women across the country. She gave a guest lecture at the 5th International Biodeterioration Symposium in Aberdeen, Scotland. She supported pre-college students presenting their scientific work at science fairs and junior science academies. She was also encouraged minority women to participate in the sciences.

== Family ==
Helen Matusevich married Frank Oujesky on 27 December 1951. They had three children – Michael Jerome, David Franklin, and Christopher Aaron. She was predeceased by Christopher and her husband, Frank. She died at the age of 79 on February 1, 2010, and was buried at Mount Olivet Cemetery.

== Membership ==
Oujesky was a member of the following institutions and societies at various stages of her career.

- President Altrusa Club San Antonio
- Member of board directors Alamo Regional Academy of Sciences & Engineering, San Antonio
- San Antonio Women's Celebration & Hall of Fame
- Fellow Texas Academy of Sciences
- Member American Association for the Advancement of Science
- American Association of University Women (as president from 1985 to 1987, and president Texas branch from 1994)
- American Society for Microbiology
- Society for Industrial Microbiology (on the Education committee from 1976)
- Sigma Xi (Alamo chapter president 1985–1986)
