= Michael Keasler =

American judge

Mike Keasler

Place 6 Judge of the Texas Court of Criminal Appeals
- In office January 1, 1999 – December 31, 2020
- Preceded by: Charlie Baird
- Succeeded by: Jesse McClure

Personal details
- Born: August 16, 1942 (age 84)
- Party: Republican
- Spouse: Nancy Lawson Keasler (m. 1969)
- Children: 1
- Education: University of Texas, Austin (B.A, J.D)

Michael Edward Keasler (born August 16, 1942), was a judge of the nine-member Texas Court of Criminal Appeals, the state court of last resort for criminal cases in Texas, from January 1999 to December 2020.

Keasler received a B.A. from the University of Texas at Austin, followed by an LL.B. from the University of Texas School of Law. He was assistant district attorney for Dallas County from 1969 to 1981, and thereafter judge of the 292nd District Court in Dallas, to which he was appointed by Governor Bill Clements in September 1981.

Keasler was elected to the Texas Court of Criminal Appeals as a Republican in 1998, and was re-elected in 2004 and 2010. Keasler was renominated in the Spring of 2016, and reelected to a fourth six-year term in the general election held on November 8, 2016. With 4,785,012 votes (55 percent), he defeated the Democrat Robert Burns, who polled 3,558,844 ballots (40.9 percent). The remaining 360,167 votes (4.1 percent) were secured by the Libertarian nominee, Mark W. Bennett. Burns had received 957,162 votes running unopposed in the Democratic primary on March 1. Keasler reached mandatory retirement on December 31, 2020.

Legal offices
Preceded by Charlie Baird	Judge of the Texas Court of Criminal Appeals; Place 6; 1999–2020	Succeeded by Jesse McClure
