= Tim Cole =

American victim of miscarriage of justice

- Cole's yearbook photo
- Born: Timothy Brian Cole; July 1, 1960; Brenham, Texas, U.S.
- Died: December 2, 1999 (aged 39); Brazoria, Texas, U.S.
- Resting place: Mount Olivet Cemetery (Fort Worth, Texas)
- Occupations: Military veteran University student
- Status: Died in prison (December 2, 1999); Conviction overturned (May 11, 2009)
- Conviction: Rape (posthumously overturned)
- Penalty: 25 years in prison (posthumously overturned)

Timothy Brian Cole (July 1, 1960 – December 2, 1999) was an American military veteran and a Texas Tech University student wrongfully convicted of raping a fellow student in 1985.

Cole attended two years of college followed by two years of service in the U.S. Army. After his Army service, he returned to college at Texas Tech in Lubbock. Cole died after serving 14 years in prison, but was posthumously pardoned.

== Crime and aftermath ==
On March 24, 1985, Michele Mallin, a student at Texas Tech University in Lubbock, had just parked her car when she was accosted by a man, forced back into the car, and raped. The rape was one of a number of similar attacks in the area at the time. Police showed photographs of potential suspects to Mallin, including one of Cole, another student at Texas Tech. She picked his photograph and later picked him out from a police lineup. Cole was convicted by a jury of rape, primarily based on the testimony of the victim. He was sentenced to 25 years in prison. While incarcerated, he was offered parole if he would admit guilt, but he refused. Cole died in prison on December 2, 1999, during an asthma attack. His family, later joined by the victim, sought to clear his name through the Innocence Project of Texas.

Another man, Jerry Wayne Johnson, confessed to the rape multiple times, starting in 1995. Further, Mallin later admitted that she was mistaken as to the identity of her attacker. Mallin told police that the rapist smoked during the rape. However, Cole never smoked because of his severe asthma. DNA evidence later showed him to be innocent. Johnson confirmed in court that he was the rapist and asked the victim and Cole's family to forgive him. "It's been on my heart to express my sincerest sorrow and regret and ask to be forgiven," said Johnson, who is serving life in prison for two other 1985 rapes. However, Johnson cannot be charged in the Mallin case because the statute of limitations has expired. On February 6, 2009, a Texas district court judge announced "to a 100 percent moral, factual and legal certainty" that Timothy Cole did not commit the rape. The judge, Charlie Baird, reversed the conviction and ordered Cole's record expunged. It was the first posthumous DNA exoneration in the history of the United States and the state of Texas. Cole's exoneration led to numerous changes in Texas law.

== Legislation ==
The Texas Senate passed legislation to exonerate Cole. The Texas House of Representatives bill passed through committee and then the full house. After that, it went to Governor Rick Perry to be signed into law. Another bill, named after Cole, was passed by the legislature and sent to the governor on May 11, 2009. It made those who are falsely convicted of a crime eligible for $160,000 for each year of incarceration—half paid as a lump sum, and half paid out over the claimant's lifetime as an annuity—and provide them with free college tuition.

Since the Tim Cole Act became law, Texas has paid $99.8 million in lump-sum payments to at least 93 people who were wrongfully convicted. The state currently pays close to $6 million per year in monthly annuity payments.

Texas law firm Glasheen, Valles & Inderman also worked with Texas Senator John Cornyn to convince the United States Internal Revenue Service that compensation for incarceration stemming from a wrongful conviction should not be treated as taxable income, that instead it should be treated the same as compensation for personal injuries which is not taxable income. This ultimately led to the passing of the Protecting Americans from Tax Hikes Act of 2015.

The bill also established the Timothy Cole Advisory Panel on Wrongful Convictions. A panel set up to study the causes of wrongful convictions and to devise ways of preventing them is to report to the Texas governor no later than 2011. While Perry stated he wanted to issue a pardon, he felt that he was not legally able to do so. However, on January 7, 2010, Texas Attorney General Greg Abbott issued an opinion which cleared the way for the governor to pardon Cole. On March 2, 2010, Governor Perry granted Timothy Cole the state's first posthumous pardon. On May 19, 2015, Governor Greg Abbott signed the Tim Cole Exoneration Review Commission into law. The Tim Cole Commission will review past exonerations and make recommendations to the Texas Legislature regarding criminal justice reform.

== Memorials and posthumous degree ==
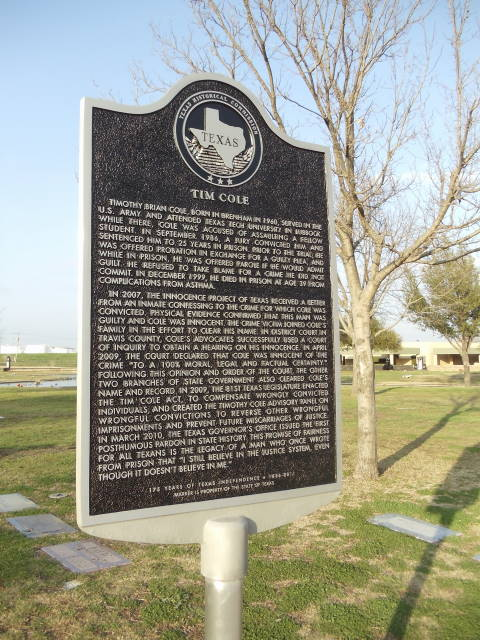
Historical marker at Cole's grave

On February 3, 2012, on the third anniversary of Cole's exoneration, the State of Texas unveiled a historical marker at his grave. In June 2012, the Lubbock City Council voted to honor Cole with a memorial. The statue, created by Lubbock-based sculptor Eddie Dixon, is the first of its kind to recognize a wrongfully convicted person. The $250,000, 19-foot (5.8 m) bronze and granite statue, paid for by local attorney Kevin Glasheen, is located at 2500 19 Street, and was unveiled in September 2014.

During the first week of March 2015, the Texas Tech University System Board of Regents approved for Cole an honorary degree in law and social justice. A ceremony was held on May 15, 2015.

== See also ==
- Innocent prisoner's dilemma
- List of wrongful convictions in the United States
