= Mary Lou Keel =

American judge

Judge of the Texas Court of Criminal Appeals
- Incumbent
- Assumed office January 1, 2017
- Preceded by: Larry Meyers

Personal details
- Party: Republican
- Spouse: Jim Hippard
- Children: 3
- Education: University of Texas, Austin (BA); University of Houston (JD)
- Website: Office website

Mary Lou Keel is an American attorney serving as a judge of the Texas Court of Criminal Appeals since 2017. A member of the Republican Party, she served as a judge for the 232nd District Court from 1995 to 2017.

She ran against incumbent Larry Meyers, who was expected to lose after he switched party allegiance to become a Democrat. In the Republican primary, she ran against Collin County District Judges Chris Oldner and Ray Wheless. Keel described Wheless as 'deceptive and inaccurate." When she ran she had 31 years of criminal legal experience.

In 2012 the Texas Department of Public Safety found out that an analyst at the Houston crime lab, Jonathan Salvador, had intentionally falsified lab results, calling into question the validity of nearly 5,000 drug cases. Four hundred of those cases were in Harris Country where Keel was serving as a State District Judge. The district attorney's office requested help from the Harris County Public Defender's Office to retry hundreds of cases, but a dispute arose between Judge Keel and the public defender's office. The Houston Press reports that the dispute was about "how, or even if, public defenders were allowed to help those 400 people get new trials."

Keel was unwilling to work with the public defenders after the dispute, and between 2014 and 2016 she appointed only one public defender in her court. On this issue she has said "They think 'oh we're doing all this great work, We're gonna be the hero [...] They certainly wanted to take on all these easy cases—it makes their stats look good. If they can get a bunch of these slam-dunk writs where almost everyone's going to be granted relief, yeah, they got carried away—but not out of the goodness of their heart." The public defender's office has denied this saying "If you talk to anyone at the DA's office, they'll say they asked us to do this."

In a second controversy it was discovered that hundreds of defendants had pleaded guilty to drug possession in order to get out of jail because of backlogs in drug testing at the Houston Police Department crime lab. Some of those drugs tests came back negative several months or years later. By the summer of 2016, it was estimated that nearly 300 people had been wrongly convicted. The public defender started filing writs of habeas corpus on behalf of the defendants in various courts, including Keel's. However, because public defenders are only appointed to represent defendants after a judge finds that the defendants are indigent, Keel's position was that the public defender had circumvented her judicial authority by not seeking permission or official appointment from the court before filing the writs. She said, "There was no authority whatsoever for them to take those cases[...]And this is the thing that kills me: They tried to double-talk their way out of it and pretend like there was some arrangement that gave them the authority. And they have still not come clean on it."

== Personal life ==
Keel is from a well-known Austin political family and has five brothers. She speaks Spanish and is a volunteer interpreter for Cuban dissidents on translatingcuba.com.
