= Scott Walker (judge) =

American jurist

Judge of the Texas Court of Criminal Appeals
- Incumbent
- Assumed office January 1, 2017
- Preceded by: Cheryl Johnson

Personal details
- Born: July 10, 1953 (age 73)
- Party: Republican
- Spouse: Pam
- Children: 2
- Education: Dallas Baptist University (BA); Baylor University (JD)
- Website: Office website

Richard Scott Walker (born July 10, 1953) is an American judge in the U.S. state of Texas.

== Early life and education ==
Walker was elected to the Texas Court of Criminal Appeals (CCA) in 2016. Walker graduated from Red Oak High School in 1971. He completed his undergraduate degree at Dallas Baptist University and received his J.D. degree from the Baylor Law School.

== Career ==
Prior to his election campaign, he was a defense attorney in Fort Worth, Texas. He was 63 years old when he ran for Place 5 of CCA. The Houston Chronicle described him as having a "politically famous name" (referring to the Governor of Wisconsin, who is also named Scott Walker). After his victory, he said that he had won not because of his recognizable name, but because of the amount of time he had spent campaigning. He had twenty years of experience in both trial and appellate level criminal defense work prior to his election, but had never taken a death penalty case. His opponent was Williamson County, Texas Assistant District Attorney Brent Webster.

While running for re-election in 2022, Walker refused to say whether he believed that Trump lost the 2020 election.

== Personal life ==
He and his wife, Pam, have been married since 1974; they have one son, one daughter and two grandchildren. Walker is a conservative Republican and an evangelical Christian.

== Election history ==
Texas Court of Criminal Appeals, Place 5, Republican Primary, 2016
| Party | Candidate | Votes | % |
|---|---|---|---|
| Republican | Scott Walker | 833,757 | 41.48 |
| Republican | Brent Webster | 411,119 | 20.45 |
| Republican | Steve Smith | 393,992 | 19.60 |
| Republican | Sid Harle | 371,303 | 18.47 |
| Total votes | | 2,010,171 | 100.0 |

Texas Court of Criminal Appeals, Place 5, Republican Primary runoff, 2016
| Party | Candidate | Votes | % |
|---|---|---|---|
| Republican | Scott Walker | 206,922 | 58.02 |
| Republican | Brent Webster | 149,714 | 41.98 |
| Total votes | | 356,636 | 100.0 |
