= Evan Young =

American judge (born 1976)

Justice of the Texas Supreme Court
- Incumbent
- Assumed office November 10, 2021
- Appointed by: Greg Abbott
- Preceded by: Eva Guzman

Personal details
- Born: Evan Andrew Young; September 14, 1976 (age 49)
- Party: Republican
- Spouse: Tobi Merritt Edwards
- Children: 1
- Education: Duke University (BA); Magdalen College, Oxford (BA); Yale University (JD)
- Website: Office website Campaign website

Evan Andrew Young (born September 14, 1976) is an American lawyer serving as a justice of the Supreme Court of Texas since 2021.

== Education and career ==
Young graduated from Tom C. Clark High School in San Antonio, and then earned a Bachelor of Arts in history from Duke University in 1999, where he graduated summa cum laude and was inducted into Phi Beta Kappa. He was also selected as a Marshall Scholar, and earned a Bachelor of Arts from Magdalen College, Oxford. He graduated from Yale Law School in 2004. Following law school, Young served as a law clerk to Judge J. Harvie Wilkinson III of the United States Court of Appeals for the Fourth Circuit and Associate Justice Antonin Scalia of the Supreme Court of the United States.

Young then served as counsel to the United States Attorney General during George W. Bush's second term, during which time he was detailed to Baghdad, Iraq as part of the U.S. Government’s Rule of Law mission. He later became a partner at Baker Botts, where he chaired the firm's Supreme Court and Constitutional Law practice group.

Young was a member of the Texas Judicial Council from 2017 to 2021. He has been an adjunct professor at the University of Texas School of Law and the University of Mississippi School of Law.

== Judicial service ==
Following Justice Eva Guzman's resignation, Governor Greg Abbott appointed Young to the Supreme Court of Texas on November 1, 2021. He took the oath of office on November 10, 2021, and was elected to a six-year term in 2022.

== Personal life ==
Young lives in Austin with his wife, Tobi Merritt Edwards Young, and their daughter. An enrolled citizen of the Chickasaw Nation, Tobi Young clerked for Justice Neil Gorsuch in 2018–19, and is believed to be the first member of a Native American tribe to serve as a U.S. Supreme Court law clerk.

== See also ==
- List of law clerks for the ninth seat of the Supreme Court of the United States

Legal offices
Preceded by Eva Guzman	Justice of the Texas Supreme Court; 2021–present	Incumbent
