= Jesse McClure =

American judge (born 1972)

Judge of the Texas Court of Criminal Appeals
- Incumbent
- Assumed office January 1, 2021
- Appointed by: Greg Abbott
- Preceded by: Michael Keasler

Personal details
- Born: 1972 (age 53–54) Sacramento, California, U.S.
- Party: Republican
- Education: University of North Carolina, Chapel Hill (BA); University of Texas, Austin (JD)
- Website: Office website Campaign website

Jesse F. McClure III (born 1972) is a Judge of the Texas Court of Criminal Appeals.

== Biography ==
McClure graduated from Marcos de Niza High School in Tempe, Arizona, received his Bachelor of Arts, with honors, from the University of North Carolina at Chapel Hill, and his Juris Doctor from the University of Texas School of Law. He spent the 1992–1993 academic year at the University of Sussex near Brighton, United Kingdom.

== Legal career ==
McClure began his career as an associate with Brown McCarroll and Oaks Hartline, and then served as an Assistant District Attorney for Tarrant County. He was briefly an attorney at the United States Department of Homeland Security, and then became a special prosecutor for the Texas Department of Insurance.

== State court service ==
In 2019, Governor Greg Abbott appointed McClure to the trial court bench in Harris County. He was elevated to the Texas Court of Criminal Appeals in December 2020. He is the first African American judge on the court since 1998, and the third African American judge on the court in Texas history. Judge McClure was elected to a full term in 2022, recording the largest margin of victory by percentage of any statewide candidate on the ballot.

McClure is also the sixth African American to hold statewide office in Texas overall following Louis Sturns, Morris Overstreet, Michael Williams, Wallace Jefferson and Dale Wainwright.

== See also ==
- List of African-American jurists
- List of University of North Carolina at Chapel Hill alumni

Legal offices
Preceded by Michael Keasler	Judge of the Texas Court of Criminal Appeals; 2021–present	Incumbent
