= Eva Guzman =

American judge (born 1961)

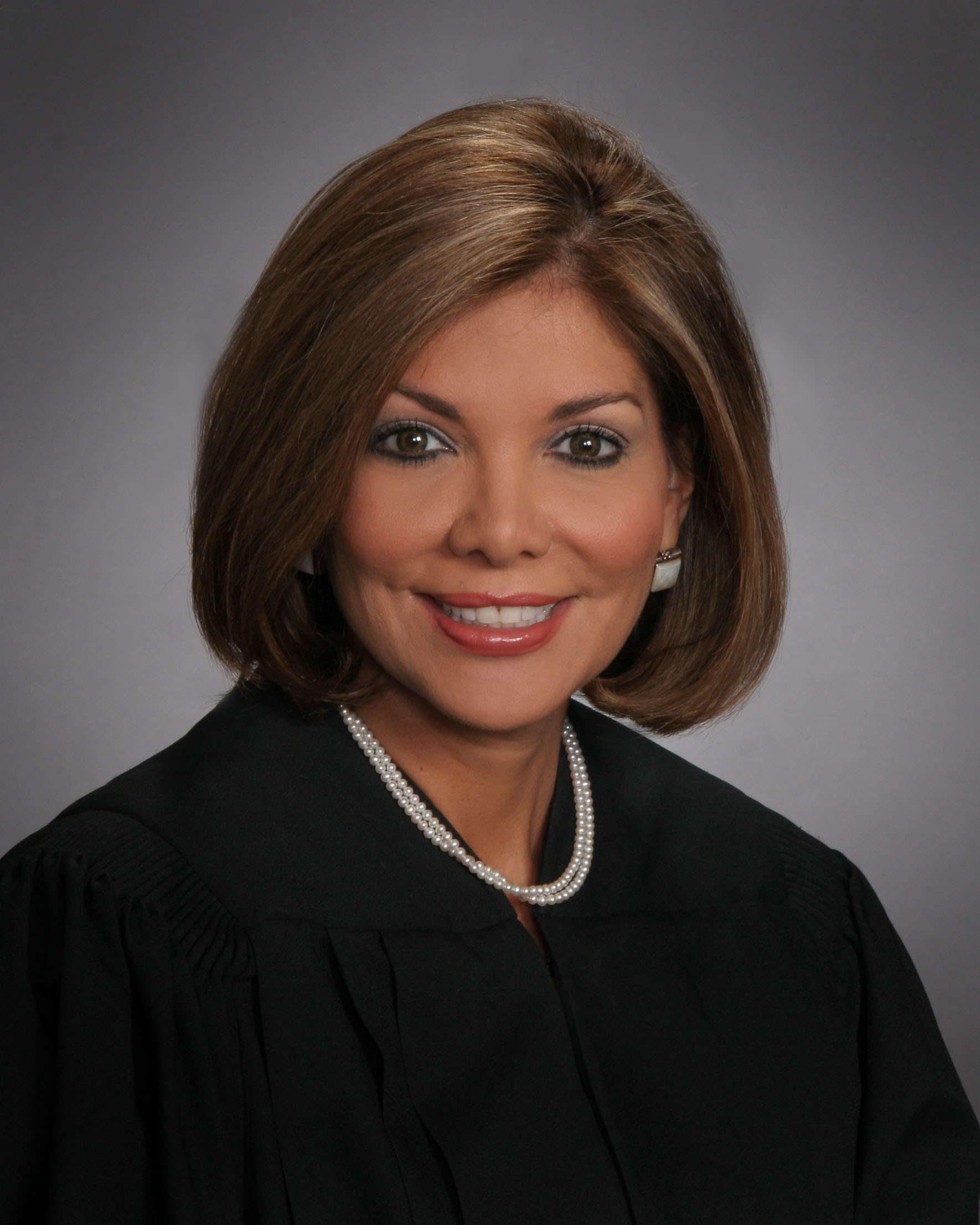

Justice of the Texas Supreme Court
- In office October 8, 2009 – June 11, 2021
- Appointed by: Rick Perry
- Preceded by: Scott Brister
- Succeeded by: Evan A. Young

Personal details
- Born: Eva Martinez; January 12, 1961 (age 65) Chicago, Illinois, U.S.
- Party: Republican
- Education: University of Houston (BA); South Texas College of Law Houston (JD); Duke University (LLM)

Eva Martinez Guzman (born January 16, 1963) is an American attorney, politician, and jurist who served as a member of the Texas Supreme Court from 2009 to 2021. In 2022, she became a partner at Wright Close & Barger, LLP in Houston, Texas.

Guzman was initially appointed to the court by then-Governor Rick Perry in 2009 to fill the seat vacated by Justice Scott Brister, who had resigned with more than a year left in his term.

In a June 7, 2021 letter to Governor Greg Abbott, Guzman announced her resignation effective by the end of the week. Guzman later announced a challenge to incumbent Attorney General Ken Paxton in the 2022 GOP primary.

== Early life and education ==
Guzman is one of seven children of Mexican immigrant parents. Born in Chicago, she was raised in Houston, where she graduated from the predominantly Hispanic Stephen F. Austin High School in 1979.

Guzman received a bachelor's degree from the University of Houston, a Juris Doctor from South Texas College of Law Houston and a Master of Laws from Duke University School of Law. She has been licensed to practice law in Texas since November 4, 1989.

== Career ==
Prior to her appointment to the state supreme court, Guzman was one of nine justices on the Fourteenth Court of Appeals in Houston, where she participated in deciding thousands of civil and criminal appeals and wrote hundreds of published opinions. She also served as an adjunct professor at the University of Houston Law Center. Before she was appointed to the appellate court, Guzman sat on a Family District Court bench in Harris County.

=== Texas Supreme Court ===
At the time of her appointment to the supreme court, then-Governor Perry called Guzman a "principled conservative with an "unmatched work ethic". Guzman won the GOP nomination for her seat in the primary election held on March 2, 2010. She defeated Judge Rose Vela of the 13th Court of Appeals 721,456 (65.3 percent) to 384,135 (34.7 percent). In the November 2 general election, Guzman defeated Democrat Blake H. Bailey.

In the Republican primary election held on March 1, 2016, Guzman won renomination for a second six-year term by defeating Joe Pool, the son of Joe R. Pool, a Democratic U.S. representative from Dallas who died in 1968. She received 1,269,231 votes (59.2 percent) to Pool's 874,128 (40.8 percent). In the November 8, 2016 general election, Guzman defeated her Democratic opponent, Savannah Robinson, with 4,884,441 votes (55.8 percent), to 3,445,959 (39.4 percent) for Robinson. Two other contenders, Don Fulton and Jim Chisholm of the Libertarian and Green parties, respectively, polled 304,587 votes (3.5 percent) and 119,022 (1.4 percent).

Guzman did not serve out her last term on the supreme court. In her June 7, 2021 resignation letter to Governor Greg Abbott, Guzman expressed gratitude for the opportunity to serve the people of Texas and highlighted her work on two supreme court commissions devoted to children in the legal system and access to justice for Texans of limited means. While Justice Guzman did not give a reason in her letter of resignation, within a couple of weeks she announced that she was running for Attorney General.

=== 2022 Texas attorney general election ===
Guzman formally announced on Monday, June 21, 2021 that she was running for the Republican nomination for attorney general. Guzman's announcement meant that the current incumbent, Ken Paxton, who is embroiled in multiple civil and criminal controversies, acquired a second high-profile challenger from within his own party. Texas Land Commissioner George P. Bush announced his bid to take on Paxton earlier in the year, a move under consideration since 2020 in light of the mounting ethics and public integrity issues surrounding Paxton. Also in November 2021, U.S. Representative Louie Gohmert announced his candidacy, making it a four way primary again.

Guzman subsequently came in 3rd in the Republican Primary, receiving 17.5% of the vote and failing to qualify for the subsequent runoff.

=== Return to private practice ===
In 2021, Guzman joined Chamberlain Hrdlicka as a shareholder, serving in the commercial litigation and appellate practices in the Houston and San Antonio Offices. Guzman then joined the Houston-based firm Wright, Close & Barger as a partner in 2022.

== Personal life ==
Guzman is married to retired Houston Police Sergeant Antonio Ray "Tony" Guzman (born 1958). The couple have one adult daughter. A resident of Cypress in Harris County, Guzman is the first Hispanic woman to serve on the Texas high court for civil appeals. Another Hispanic, David Medina, was elected to the court in 2006 and served until 2012, the year he was defeated by John P. Devine in the Republican primary run-off for re-nomination to his supreme court seat.

== Awards and honors ==
In 2025, Guzman was inducted into the Texas Women's Hall of Fame in recognition for her "devotion to the rule of law and improving outcomes for children in the child welfare system".

== See also ==
- List of Hispanic and Latino American jurists
- Hispanic and Latino conservatism in the United States

Legal offices
Preceded by Scott Brister	Justice of the Texas Supreme Court; 2009–2021	Succeeded by Evan A. Young
