= Tobi Merritt Edwards Young =

American lawyer

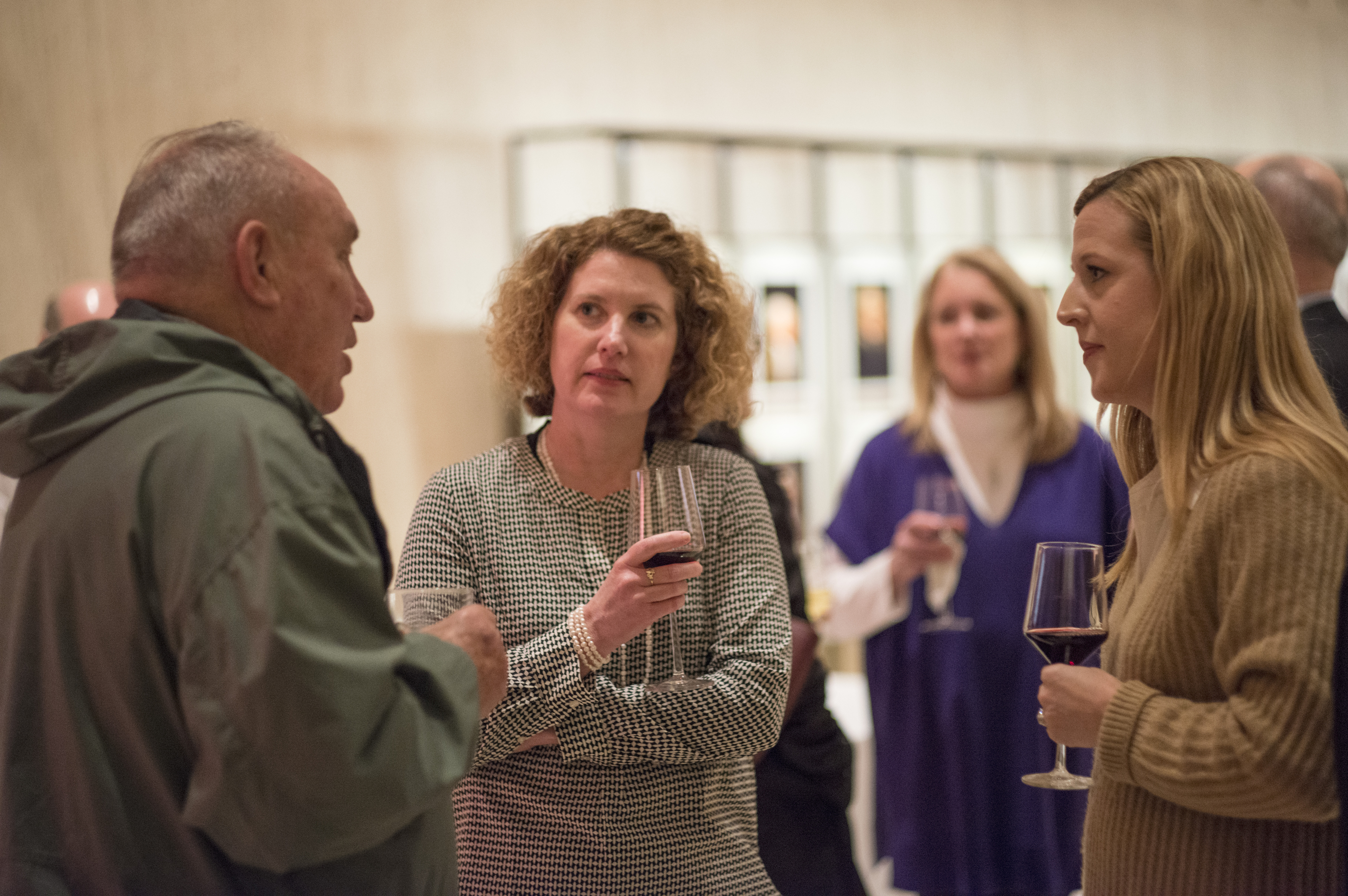
- Young (at right) in 2016
- Born: Tobi Lynn Merritt; Midwest City, Oklahoma, U.S.
- Education: Dartmouth College; George Washington University (BA); University of Mississippi (JD)
- Occupation: Corporate attorney
- Known for: Expert on civil rights law
- Spouse: Evan A. Young

Tobi Merritt Edwards Young is a Native American lawyer. An enrolled citizen of the Chickasaw Nation, Young is believed to be the first member of a Native American tribe to serve as a law clerk of the Supreme Court of the United States.

== Early life and education ==
A native of Midwest City, Oklahoma, Young is the daughter of Nancy Edwards and Rick Merritt. She briefly attended Dartmouth College and graduated from and George Washington University. In 2003, she received a JD degree from the University of Mississippi School of Law. Prior to attending law school, she was press secretary for U.S. Representative J. C. Watts.

== Career ==
After graduation, Young worked as a lawyer with the Civil Rights Division of the U.S. Department of Justice from 2003 to 2006. She worked on school desegregation issues, voter rights such as ensuring Choctaw tribe members received voting instructions in their native language, and was a delegate to Human Rights conventions on torture in Geneva, Switzerland. She then clerked for Judge Jerome A. Holmes of the United States Court of Appeals for the Tenth Circuit. She worked as associate counsel for President George W. Bush in the Office of the White House Counsel from 2007 to 2008, and was general counsel and board secretary for the George W. Bush Presidential Center from 2009 to 2018.

In 2018–19, Young served as a law clerk for Justice Neil Gorsuch of the Supreme Court of the United States. She is believed to be the first Native American tribal member to serve in that position. She first met Gorsuch when they were both working at the Justice Department. In September 2019, Young helped lead a public conversation with Justice Gorsuch at Pepperdine University School of Law.

Currently, she is the Senior Vice President of Legal and Chief Corporate and Regulatory Affairs Officer at Cognizant, a Fortune 250 technology services company.

She serves as the Chair of the Nominating and Governance Committee on the Halliburton Board of Directors.

== Personal life ==
She is married to Evan A. Young, an associate justice on the Supreme Court of Texas since 2021. He is a former law clerk for Justice Antonin Scalia.

== Selected publications ==
- Longwitz, Tobi Edwards (June 2003). "Indian Gaming: Making a New Bet on the Legislative and Executive Branches After the IGRA's Judicial Bust". Gaming Law Review. 7 (3): 197–204. doi:10.1089/109218803766651485.
