= Oakhurst Historic District =

Historic district in Texas, United States

- U.S. National Register of Historic Places
- U.S. Historic district
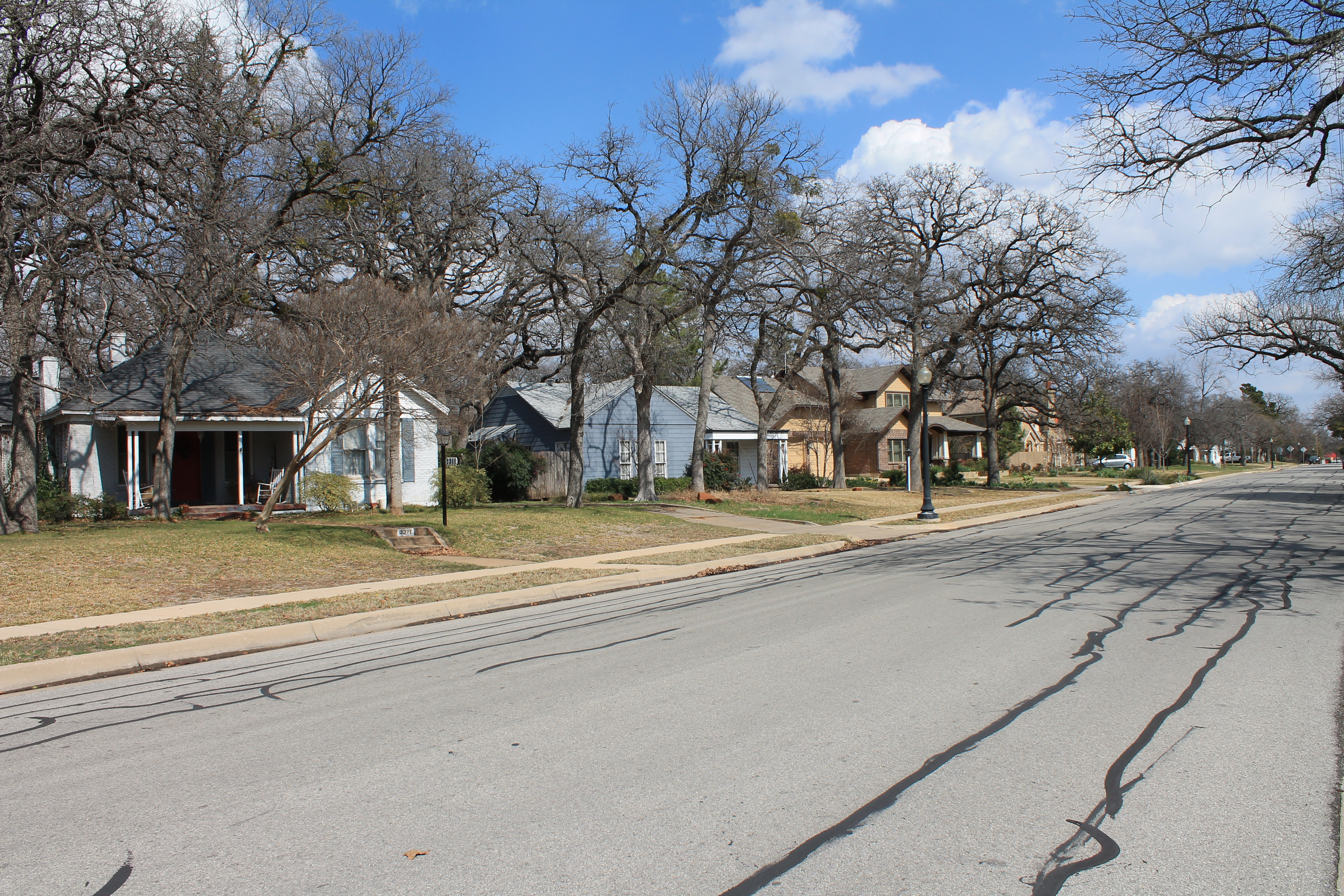
- Oakhurst District in 2013

- Location within Texas Location within the United States
- Location: Roughly bounded by Yucca Ave., Sylvania Ave., Watauga Ave., and Oakhurst Scenic Dr., Fort Worth, Texas
- Coordinates: 32°47′8″N 97°18′48″W
- Area: 253 acres (102 ha)
- Built: 1924
- Built by: Oakhurst Land Co.
- Architect: Hare & Hare
- Architectural style: Bungalow/Craftsman, Late 19th and 20th Century Revivals
- MPS: Historic Residential Suburbs in the United States, 1830-1960 MPS
- NRHP reference No.: 10000051
- Added to NRHP: February 24, 2010

The Oakhurst Historic District is a historic district in Fort Worth, Texas. It was added to the National Register of Historic Places on February 24, 2010.

== Photo gallery ==
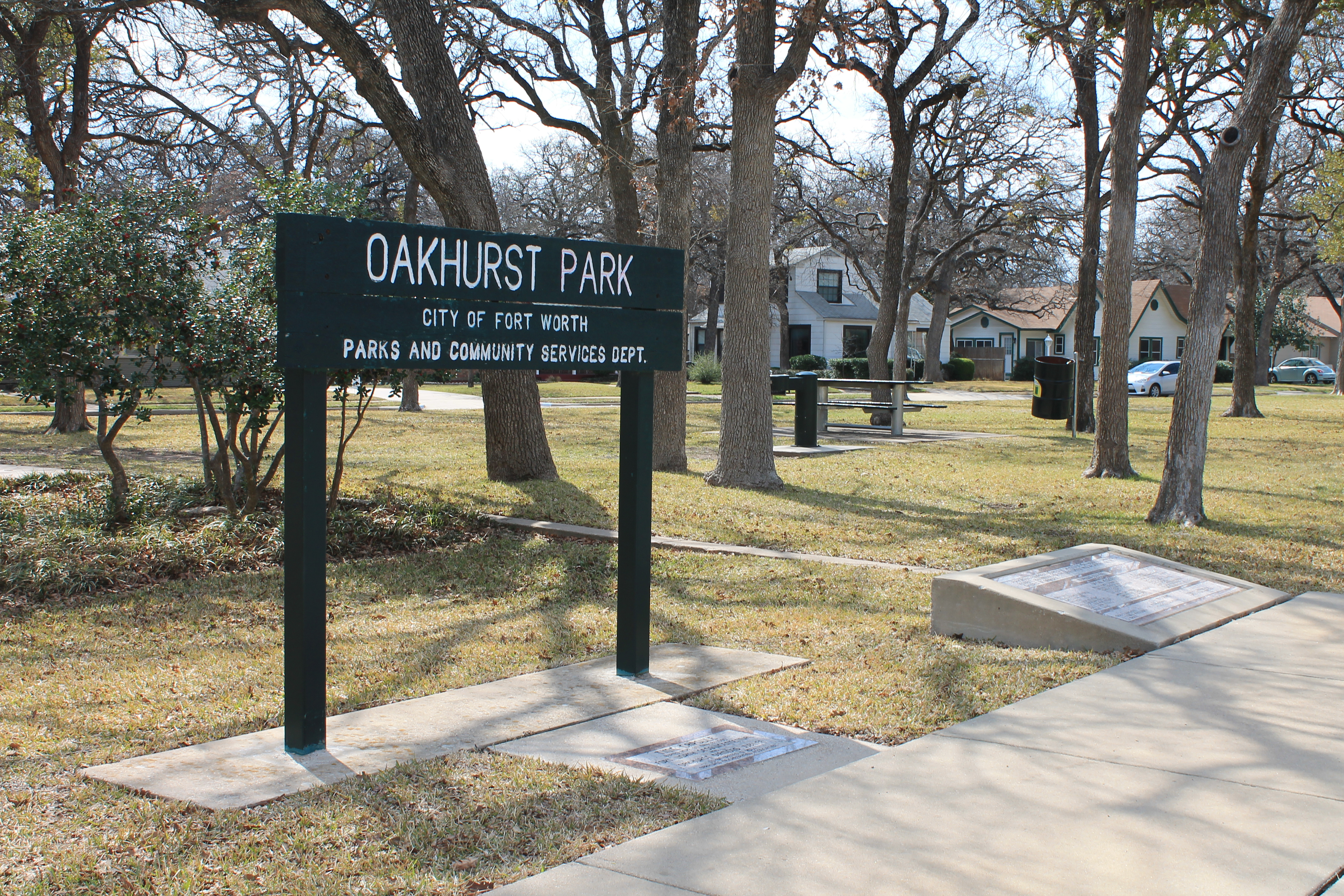

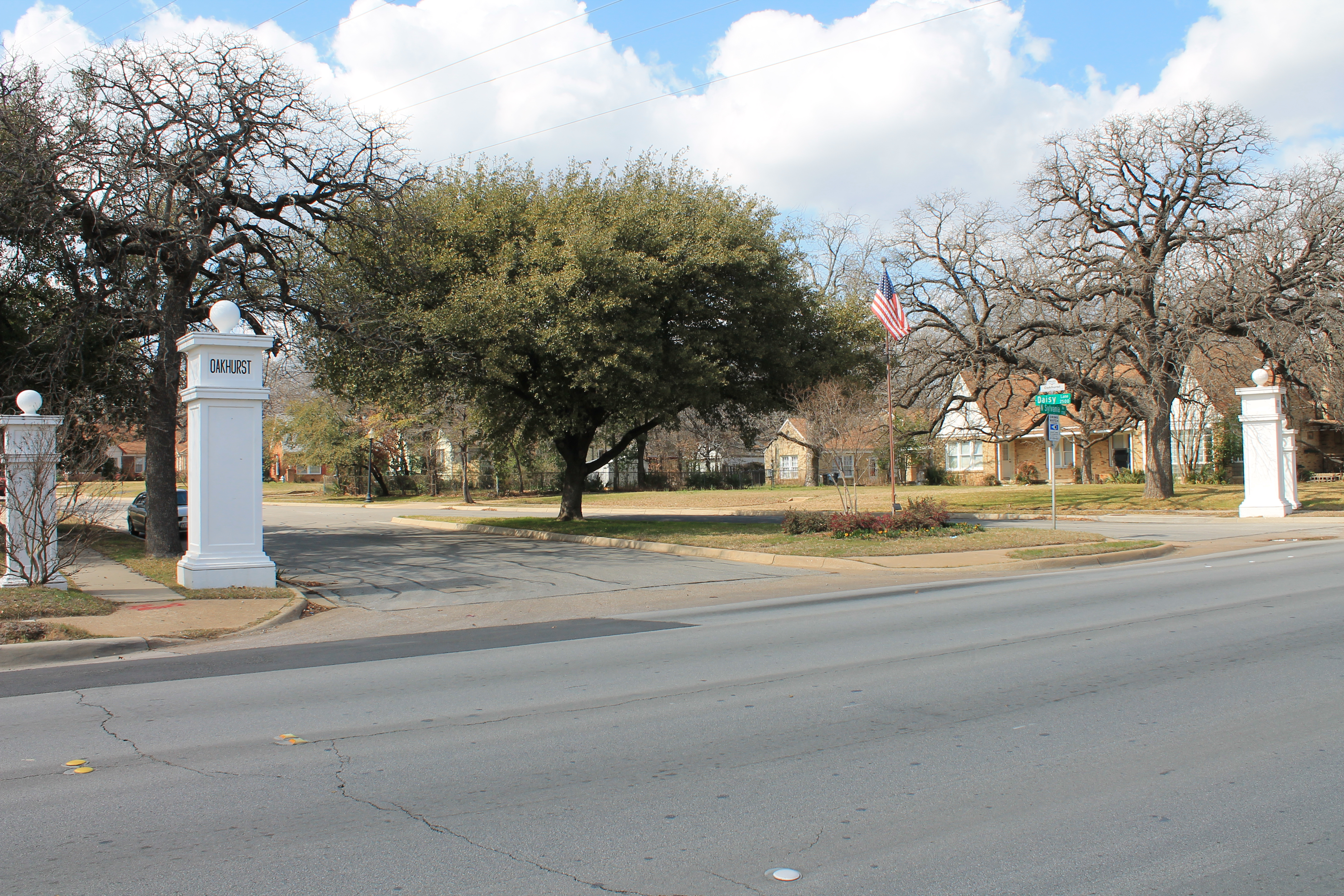

== See also ==
- National Register of Historic Places listings in Tarrant County, Texas
