= Texas Court of Criminal Appeals =

Highest court in the U.S. state of Texas for criminal matters

- Seal of the Texas Court of Criminal Appeals

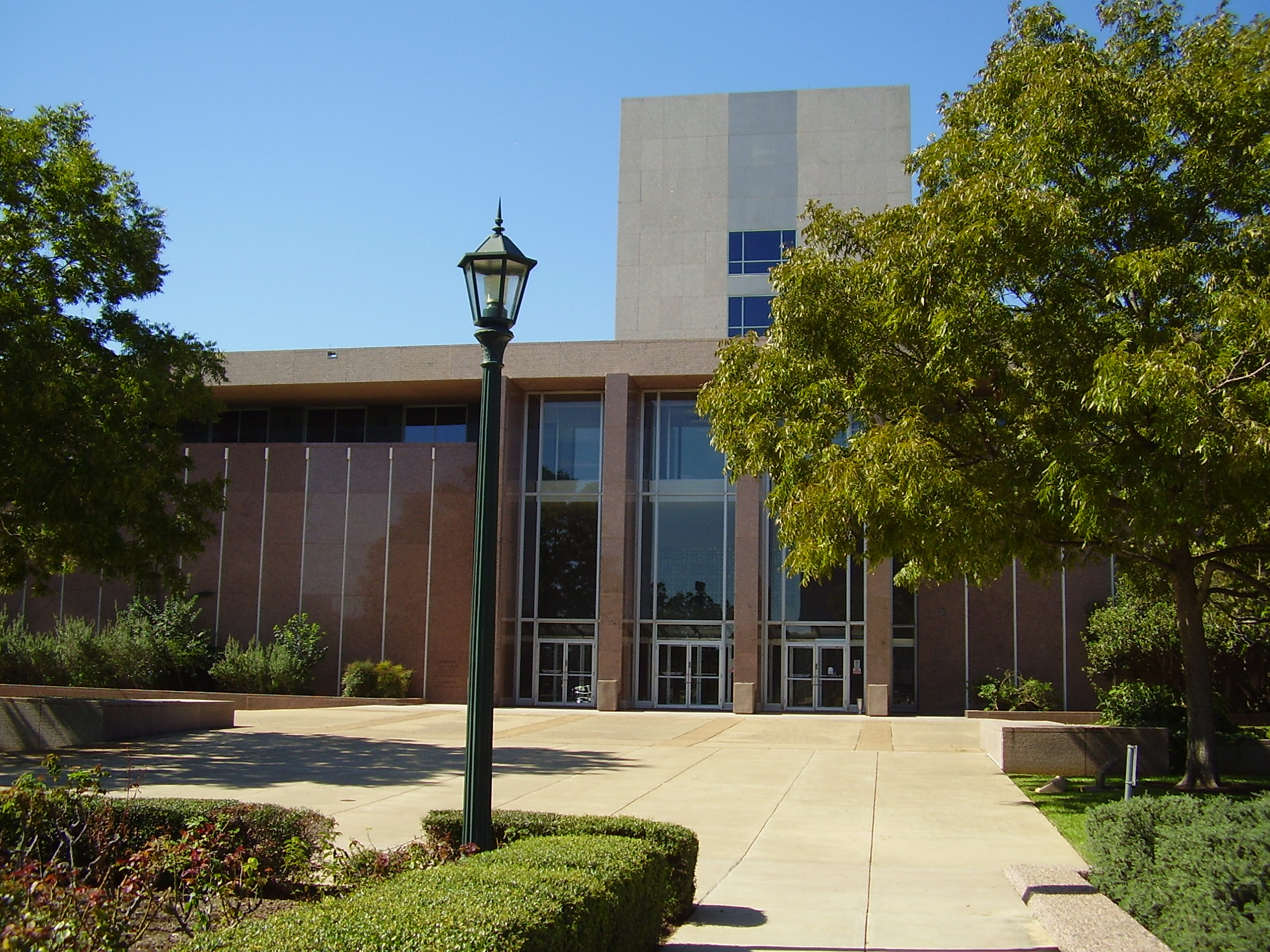
- Texas Supreme Court Building
- Interactive map of Texas Court of Criminal Appeals
- 30°16′34.76″N 97°44′28.56″W
- Established: 1891
- Jurisdiction: Texas
- Location: Austin, Texas
- Coordinates: 30°16′34.76″N 97°44′28.56″W
- Authorised by: Texas Constitution
- Appeals to: Supreme Court of the United States
- Website: Official website

The Texas Court of Criminal Appeals (CCA) is the court of last resort for all criminal matters in Texas. The Court, which is based in the Supreme Court Building in Downtown Austin, is composed of a presiding judge and eight judges.

Article V of the Texas Constitution vests the judicial power of the state and describes the Court's jurisdiction and sets rules for judicial eligibility, elections, and vacancies.

== Jurisdiction ==
In Texas, the Court of Criminal Appeals has final jurisdiction over all criminal matters except for juvenile proceedings, which are considered civil matters whereas the Texas Supreme Court is the last decision on all civil matters.

The Court of Criminal Appeals exercises discretionary review over criminal cases, which means that it may choose whether or not to review a case. The only cases that the Court must hear are those involving the sentencing of capital punishment or the denial of bail.

== Court composition ==
The Court is composed of a presiding judge and eight judges (unlike the Texas Supreme Court which is composed of a chief justice and eight justices). Each judge serves a six-year term beginning January 1 and ending December 31, and the judges are elected in staggered partisan elections. Although all nine seats are elected at large, the presiding judge seat is separately designated from the other seats.

In order to be a judge, a person must be at least 35 years of age, a United States and Texas citizen, licensed to practice law in Texas, and must have practiced law for at least 10 years. A person 75 years or older cannot run for a seat on the Court of Criminal Appeals. Judges who turn 75 during the term of office may serve until December 31 of the fourth year of their term. The Governor of Texas, subject to Senate confirmation, may appoint a judge to serve out the remainder of any unexpired term until the next general election.

=== Current judges ===
Place	Name	Born	Start	Term ends	Mandatory retirement (Note: Under Article 5 of the Texas Constitution, justices who reach the age of 75 during the first four years of their 6-year term, must retire by December 31st of the 4th year of their term. If justices reach the age of 75 during the 5th or 6th year of their term, they will be able to serve out the remainder of their term.)	Party	Appointer	Law school
1	David Schenk, Presiding Judge	September 6, 1967 (age 59)	January 1, 2025	2030	2042	Republican	—N/a (Note: Took office after being elected in a partisan election.)	Baylor
3	Bert Richardson	1956 (age 69–70)	January 1, 2015	2026	2032	Republican	—N/a	St. Mary's
4	Kevin Yeary	September 8, 1966 (age 60)	January 1, 2015	2026	2042	Republican	—N/a	St. Mary's
9	David Newell	June 9, 1971 (age 55)	January 1, 2015	2026	2048	Republican	—N/a	Texas
2	Mary Lou Keel	January 5, 1961 (age 65)	January 1, 2017	2028	2038	Republican	—N/a	Houston
5	Scott Walker	July 10, 1953 (age 73)	January 1, 2017	2028	2028	Republican	—N/a	Baylor
6	Jesse McClure	1972 (age 53–54)	January 1, 2021	2028	2050	Republican	Greg Abbott (R)	Texas
8	Lee Finley	July 19, 1970 (age 56)	January 1, 2025	2030	2046	Republican	—N/a	Texas
7	Gina Parker	November 30, 1961 (age 64)	January 1, 2025	2030	2040	Republican	—N/a	Baylor

=== Elected justices ===
Vacator	Reason	Start	Successor
Bert Richardson	Term expired	January 1, 2027	Okey Anyiam
Kevin Yeary	Defeated	January 1, 2027	Audra Riley
David Newell	Term expired	January 1, 2027	Holly E. Taylor

== Influential/notable cases ==
In 1952 Hernandez v. Texas changed the way most Mexican-Americans lived in Texas. This criminal court of appeals case, which failed to be appealed. Which eventually led to the case being taken to the United States supreme court later in 1954 and extending the 14th Amendment to recognize Mexican-Americans a distinct class protected under the 14th Amendment. The decision of the United States supreme court to extend the 14th Amendment to all Mexican-Americans did not in fact change the ruling of the case for Hernandez but laid down the foundation for equal representation for Mexican-Americans.

Ex parte Elizondo (1996) held that a “bare” claim of actual innocence could support post-conviction habeas corpus relief. Juan Elizondo had been convicted of sexual assault, but after the conviction, the complainant recanted her testimony. The trial court recommended relief, and the Texas Court of Criminal Appeals found that continued imprisonment is not justified where a person can show that no reasonable juror would have found them guilty in light of new evidence.This decision has since been cited as part of the standard governing actual innocence claims in Texas.

Ex parte Robbins (2014) granted habeas corpus relief based on advances in science that challenged the stability of evidence used at trial. Neal Robbins had been convicted of capital murder in the death of a 17-month-old child, based in part on the medical examiner’s testimony identifying the cause of death to be homicide. The medical examiner later changed her opinion about the cause of death, and the Texas Court of Criminal Appeals granted relief under a statute that allows courts to review cases when specific evidence is proven to be unreliable or outdated. This case is cited as an early use of Texas’s “junk science” law, which allows challenges to convictions based on outdated forensic evidence.

== History (1876-1986) ==
- 1876: Due to the tremendous backlog of cases the Texas Supreme Court had the Texas Constitution removed criminal jurisdiction from the Texas Supreme Court and created a three-judge Court of Appeals with exclusive criminal appellate authority.
- 1891–1892: A constitutional amendment, that was voted on by the general population and passed, created a separate Court of Criminal Appeals (three judges) as the state’s highest criminal court, beginning operation in 1892 with James Mann Hurt served as the first presiding judge
- 1925: A two-person Commission of Appeals was created to help handle the caseload which were appointed by the governor at the time, Miriam A. "Ma" Ferguson.
- 1934: Commissioners were selected by the court and their decisions became final with judicial approval.
- 1966–1967: A constitutional amendment increased the number of judges from three to five by converting the two commissioners into judges, lengthened the court’s annual session, and shifted selection of the presiding judge to voters.
- 1969–1971: The Commission of Appeals was reestablished to assist with workload; the first voter-elected presiding judge, John F. Onion, Jr., took office in 1971.
- 1977–1978: Another amendment expanded the court to nine judges and allowed it to sit in three-judge panels for non-capital punishment cases, while capital cases required the full court.
- 1980–1981: A major amendment eased the court’s workload by giving intermediate criminal appellate jurisdiction to the courts of appeals (previously named courts of civil appeals).
- Post-1981: The Court of Criminal Appeals continued to hear capital appeals directly and retained authority over habeas corpus petitions.
- 1986: The court gained power to establish evidentiary rules for criminal trials and appellate rules for criminal procedure.

== Capital punishment ==
According to a 2000 special article in the Chicago Tribune, from 1995 to 2000, records show that the court has granted new trials in capital cases eight times and new sentencing six times while affirming 270 capital convictions.

=== Selection of attorneys for indigent appellants ===
The appointment of attorneys for indigent defendants in capital cases is a source of controversy. District Court judges appoint lawyers for trial and a defendant's initial appeal. Of the 131 inmates executed under Governor George W. Bush, 43 were represented by an attorney who at some point has been disbarred, suspended or otherwise sanctioned.

The appointment of attorneys for an inmate's final appeals, which allow attorneys to move beyond what occurred at trial and investigate for new evidence, has also proved troublesome. Attorneys at this stage can argue, for instance, that prosecutors improperly concealed evidence favorable to the defendant.

Before 1995, appellants were not guaranteed an attorney for final appeals. In 1995, Texas revamped its system with a new law that collapsed the layers of appeal and set strict filing deadlines seeking to ensure that defendants received one full, fair set of appeals. The state agreed to pay for court-appointed attorneys to handle the final appeals for Death Row inmates. The Court of Criminal Appeals got the job of making these appointments. While assigning attorneys in about 300 cases, the Court of Criminal Appeals tapped some with questionable credentials or little experience.

For at least eight Death Row inmates, the court handpicked an attorney who previously had been sanctioned by the State Bar of Texas for misconduct, including one attorney who was still on probation. He was among four attorneys appointed by the court who had been disciplined more than once. In a ninth case, the attorney was sanctioned shortly after his appointment. The misconduct ranged from relatively minor infractions to serious violations. They included failing to show up in court, lying to the State Bar of Texas or to a judge, and dismissing a client's legal claim without the client's permission or knowledge.
