= 2026 Texas Supreme Court election =

- November 3, 2026

4 of 9 seats on the Supreme Court of Texas. 5 seats needed for a majority
	First party	Second party
Party	Republican	Democratic
Seats before	9	0
Seats after	5	4
Seat change	▼4	▲4

The 2026 Texas Supreme Court election were held on November 3, 2026, to elect four of nine justices to the Supreme Court of Texas. Primary elections were held on March 3.

== Chief Justice ==
2026 Texas Supreme Court Chief Justice election
- November 3, 2026

Nominee	Maggie Ellis	Jimmy Blacklock
Party	Democratic	Republican
Popular vote	5,102,288	4,625,886
Percentage	52.45%	47.55%
Chief Justice before election
Jimmy Blacklock
Republican
Elected Chief Justice
Maggie Ellis
Democratic

Chief justice Nathan Hecht retired at the end of 2024 due to the state's judicial age limit. Governor Greg Abbott appointed Supreme Court justice Jimmy Blacklock to the position on January 6, 2025.

Blacklock was originally appointed to Place 2 in early 2018 and was re-elected to the same place in November 2018 and 2024. Under Texas law, the terms of newly-appointed justices expire at the end of the next even-numbered year, thus triggering an election in 2026.

=== Republican primary ===
==== Candidates ====
===== Nominee =====
- Jimmy Blacklock, incumbent chief justice

===== Disqualified =====
- Steven Wayne Smith, former justice (2002–2005)

==== Results ====
Republican primary
Party	Candidate	Votes	%
Republican	Jimmy Blacklock (incumbent)	1,755,485	100.0
Total votes		1,755,485	100.0

=== Democratic primary ===
==== Candidates ====
===== Nominee =====
- Maggie Ellis, justice of the Third Court of Appeals of Texas (2025–present)

===== Eliminated in primary =====
- Cory Carlyle, former justice of Fifth Court of Appeals of Texas (2019–2024)

==== Endorsements ====
Cory Carlyle

Newspapers

- The Dallas Morning News
Maggie Ellis

Labor unions

- Texas AFL-CIO

Newspapers

- The Austin Chronicle
- Houston Chronicle
- San Antonio Express-News

Organizations

- EMILYs List

==== Results ====
Democratic primary
Party	Candidate	Votes	%
Democratic	Maggie Ellis	1,570,349	76.83
Democratic	Cory Carlyle	473,702	23.17
Total votes		2,044,051	100.0

=== General election ===
==== Endorsements ====
Jimmy Blacklock (R)

Newspapers

- The Dallas Morning News
Maggie Ellis (D)

Newspapers

- Houston Chronicle
- San Antonio Express-News

==== Results ====
2026 Texas Supreme Court Chief Justice election
Party	Candidate	Votes	%
Democratic	Maggie Ellis	5,102,288	52.45
Republican	Jimmy Blacklock (incumbent)	4,625,886	47.55
Total votes		9,728,174	100.0

== Place 2 ==
2026 Texas Supreme Court Place 2 election
- November 3, 2026

Nominee	Chari Kelly	James Sullivan
Party	Democratic	Republican
Popular vote	5,068,047	4,631,182
Percentage	52.25%	47.75%
Justice before election
James Sullivan
Republican
Elected Justice
Chari Kelly
Democratic

Concurrent with the appointment of Jimmy Blacklock to Chief Justice, governor Greg Abbott appointed James Sullivan to Place 2 on January 6, 2025. Under Texas law, the terms of newly-appointed justices expire at the end of the next even-numbered year, thus triggering an election in 2026.

=== Republican primary ===
==== Candidates ====
===== Nominee =====
- James Sullivan, incumbent justice and former general counsel to Greg Abbott

==== Results ====
Republican primary
Party	Candidate	Votes	%
Republican	James Sullivan (incumbent)	1,741,721	100.0
Total votes		1,741,721	100.0

=== Democratic primary ===
==== Candidates ====
===== Nominee =====
- Chari Kelly, justice of the Third Court of Appeals of Texas (2019–present)

==== Endorsements ====
Chari Kelly

Labor unions

- Texas AFL-CIO

==== Results ====
Democratic primary
Party	Candidate	Votes	%
Democratic	Chari Kelly	1,886,244	100.0
Total votes		1,886,244	100.0

=== General election ===
==== Endorsements ====
Chari Kelly (D)

Newspapers

- The Dallas Morning News
- Houston Chronicle
- San Antonio Express-News

==== Results ====
2026 Texas Supreme Court Place 2 election
Party	Candidate	Votes	%
Democratic	Chari Kelly	5,068,047	52.25
Republican	James Sullivan (incumbent)	4,631,182	47.75
Total votes		9,699,229	100.0

== Place 7 ==
2026 Texas Supreme Court Place 7 election
- November 3, 2026

Nominee	Kristen Hawkins	Kyle Hawkins
Party	Democratic	Republican
Popular vote	5,112,073	4,572,758
Percentage	52.78%	47.22%
Justice before election
Kyle Hawkins
Republican
Elected Justice
Kristen Hawkins
Democratic

Place 7 judge Jeffrey Boyd retired on September 1, 2025. Governor Greg Abbott appointed former Solicitor General of Texas Kyle Hawkins to the position on October 24, 2025. Under Texas law, the terms of newly-appointed justices expire at the end of the next even-numbered year, thus triggering an election in 2026.

=== Republican primary ===
==== Candidates ====
===== Nominee =====
- Kyle Hawkins, incumbent justice and former Solicitor General of Texas

===== Declined =====
- Jeff Boyd, former justice (2012–2025)

==== Results ====
Republican primary
Party	Candidate	Votes	%
Republican	Kyle Hawkins (incumbent)	1,728,132	100.0
Total votes		1,728,132	100.0

=== Democratic primary ===
==== Candidates ====
===== Nominee =====
- Kristen Hawkins, judge of the 11th Texas District Court (2017–present)

===== Eliminated in primary =====
- Gordon Goodman, former justice of the First Court of Appeals of Texas (2019–2024)

==== Endorsements ====
Gordon Goodman

Organizations

- University of Texas at Austin College Democrats
Kristen Hawkins

Newspapers

- The Austin Chronicle
- The Dallas Morning News
- Houston Chronicle
- San Antonio Express-News

Organizations

- EMILYs List

==== Results ====
Democratic primary
Party	Candidate	Votes	%
Democratic	Kristen Hawkins	1,528,221	75.62
Democratic	Gordon Goodman	492,589	24.38
Total votes		2,020,810	100.0

=== General election ===
Kristen Hawkins (D)

Newspapers

- The Dallas Morning News
- Houston Chronicle
- San Antonio Express-News

==== Results ====
2026 Texas Supreme Court Place 7 election
Party	Candidate	Votes	%
Democratic	Kristen Hawkins	5,112,073	52.78
Republican	Kyle Hawkins (incumbent)	4,572,758	47.22
Total votes		9,684,831	100.0

== Place 8 ==
2026 Texas Supreme Court Place 8 election
- November 3, 2026

Nominee	Gisela Triana	Brett Busby
Party	Democratic	Republican
Popular vote	5,033,586	4,643,375
Percentage	52.02%	47.98%
Justice before election
Brett Busby
Republican
Elected Justice
Gisela Triana
Democratic

Incumbent Brett Busby was running for a second six-year term. He was appointed by governor Greg Abbott to Place 8 in March 2019 and was elected to a full term in 2020.

=== Republican primary ===
==== Candidates ====
===== Nominee =====
- Brett Busby, incumbent justice

===== Disqualified =====
- David Rogers, Pflugerville city council member

==== Results ====
Republican primary
Party	Candidate	Votes	%
Republican	Brett Busby (incumbent)	1,719,374	100.0
Total votes		1,719,374	100.0

=== Democratic primary ===
==== Candidates ====
===== Nominee =====
- Gisela Triana, justice of the Third Court of Appeals of Texas (2019–present), nominee for Texas Supreme Court Place 8 in 2020

Democratic primary
Party	Candidate	Votes	%
Democratic	Gisela Triana	1,903,827	100.0
Total votes		1,903,827	100.0

=== General election ===
Brett Busby (R)

Newspapers

- The Dallas Morning News
- Houston Chronicle
Gisela Triana (D)

Newspapers

- San Antonio Express-News

==== Results ====
2026 Texas Supreme Court Place 8 election
Party	Candidate	Votes	%
Democratic	Gisela Triana	5,033,586	52.02
Republican	Brett Busby (incumbent)	4,643,375	47.98
Total votes		9,676,961	100.0
