= 2020 Texas elections =

- November 3, 2020

Elections were held in Texas on Tuesday, November 3, 2020. Its primaries were held on March 3, 2020, with runoffs taking place on July 14.

In addition to the U.S. presidential race, Texas voters elected the Class II U.S. senator from Texas, one of three members of the Texas Railroad Commission, eight of 15 members of the Texas Board of Education, all of its seats to the House of Representatives, four of nine seats on the Supreme Court of Texas, three of nine seats on the Texas Court of Criminal Appeals, 21 of 80 seats on the Texas Appellate Courts, all of the seats of the Texas House of Representatives and 17 of 34 seats in the Texas State Senate.

To vote by mail, registered Texas voters had to request a ballot by October 23, 2020. After the U.S. Supreme Court rejected a bid to expand eligibility for requesting postal ballots, postal ballots were available only to voters over 65, those sick or disabled, those who were out of their county on election day, and those who were in jail (and otherwise eligible to vote), as defined by Texas law.

In the primaries, Democratic voters outnumbered Republican voters. In the general election, no net changes occurred in any federal position, nor any statewide officer position, any legislative or judicial chamber, although Democrats gained District 5 on the State Board of Education.

== Federal ==
=== President of the United States ===
Texas has 38 electoral votes in the Electoral College.

=== United States House of Representatives ===
There were 36 U.S. Representatives in Texas up for election in addition to six open seats.

== Executive ==
=== Railroad Commissioner ===
2020 Texas Railroad Commissioner election
- November 3, 2020
Nominee	Jim Wright	Chrysta Castañeda
Party	Republican	Democratic
Popular vote	5,831,263	4,792,422
Percentage	53.0%	43.6%
- County results Wright: 40–50% 50–60% 60–70% 70–80% 80–90% 90–100% Castañeda: 40–50% 50–60% 60–70%
Railroad Commissioner before election
Ryan Sitton
Republican
Elected Railroad Commissioner
Jim Wright
Republican

==== Republican primary ====
===== Nominee =====
- Jim Wright, cattle rancher

===== Eliminated in primary =====
- Ryan Sitton, incumbent Railroad Commissioner

===== Primary results =====
Republican primary results
Party	Candidate	Votes	%
Republican	Jim Wright	991,593	55.29%
Republican	Ryan Sitton (incumbent)	801,904	44.71%
Total votes		1,793,497	100.0%

==== Democratic primary ====
===== Nominee =====
- Chrysta Castañeda, oil and energy industry attorney

===== Eliminated in runoff =====
- Roberto Alonzo, former state representative (2003–2019)

===== Eliminated in primary =====
- Kelly Stone, environmental activist
- Mark Watson, attorney

===== Primary results =====
Democratic primary results
Party	Candidate	Votes	%
Democratic	Chrysta Castañeda	598,638	33.85%
Democratic	Roberto Alonzo	506,748	28.65%
Democratic	Kelly Stone	383,453	21.68%
Democratic	Mark Watson	279,911	15.83%
Total votes		1,768,750	100.0%

===== Runoff results =====
Democratic primary runoff results
Party	Candidate	Votes	%
Democratic	Chrysta Castañeda	579,698	62.02%
Democratic	Roberto Alonzo	355,053	37.98%
Total votes		934,751	100.0%

==== General election ====
===== Polling =====
Poll source	Date(s) administered	Sample size (Note: Key: A – all adults RV – registered voters LV – likely voters V – unclear)	Margin of error	Jim Wright (R)	Chrysta Castañeda (D)	Other	Undecided
YouGov/University of Houston	October 13–20, 2020	1,000 (LV)	± 3.1%	47%	38%	4% (Note: Sterett (L) with 3%; Gruene (G) with 1%)	11%
Data for Progress (D)	August 20–25, 2020	2,295 (LV)	± 2.0%	39%	33%	–	25%
Global Strategy Group (D) (Note: Poll sponsored by Castañeda's campaign)	August 11–13, 2020	700 (LV)	± 3.7%	37%	31%	8% (Note: Sterett (L) with 8%)	24%

===== Results =====
2020 Texas Railroad Commissioner election
Party	Candidate	Votes	%	±%
Republican	Jim Wright	5,831,263	53.01%	−5.26%
Democratic	Chrysta Castañeda	4,792,422	43.56%	+7.04%
Libertarian	Matt Sterett	247,659	2.25%	−0.9%
Green	Katija "Kat" Gruene	129,638	1.18%	−0.86%
Total votes		11,000,982	100.0%	
Republican hold				

== State Board of Education ==
Eight of 15 seats of the Texas Board of Education were up for election. Before the election the composition of that board was:

Party	# of seats
Republican	10
Democratic	5
Total	15

=== Member, District 1 ===
==== Republican primary ====
Republican primary results
Party	Candidate	Votes	%
Republican	Jennifer Ivey	58,015	100%
Total votes		58,015	100%

==== Democratic primary ====
Democratic primary results
Party	Candidate	Votes	%
Democratic	Georgina C. Pérez (incumbent)	111,214	100%
Total votes		111,214	100%

==== General election ====
General election results
Party	Candidate	Votes	%
Democratic	Georgina C. Pérez (incumbent)	287,623	55.77%
Republican	Jennifer Ivey	228,140	44.23%
Total votes		515,763	100%

=== Member, District 5 ===
==== Republican primary ====
Republican primary results
Party	Candidate	Votes	%
Republican	Robert Morrow	54,460	40.0%
Republican	Lani Popp	46,276	33.99%
Republican	Inga Cotton	35,425	26.01%
Total votes		136,161	100%

Republican primary runoff results
Party	Candidate	Votes	%
Republican	Lani Popp	55,990	77.96%
Republican	Robert Morrow	15,827	22.04%
Total votes		71,817	100%

==== Democratic primary ====
Democratic primary results
Party	Candidate	Votes	%
Democratic	Rebecca Bell-Metereau	143,351	68.51%
Democratic	Letti Bresnahan	65,885	31.49%
Total votes		209,236	100%

==== Libertarian convention ====
Libertarian convention
Party	Candidate	Votes	%
Libertarian	Stephanie Berlin		
Total votes			100%

==== General election ====
General election results
Party	Candidate	Votes	%
Democratic	Rebecca Bell-Metereau	493,930	48.94%
Republican	Lani Popp	475,824	47.15%
Libertarian	Stephanie Berlin	39,456	3.91%
Total votes		1,009,210	100%
Democratic gain from Republican			

=== Member, District 6 ===
==== Republican primary ====
Republican primary results
Party	Candidate	Votes	%
Republican	Will Hickman	88,900	100%
Total votes		88,900	100%

==== Democratic primary ====
Democratic primary results
Party	Candidate	Votes	%
Democratic	Michelle Palmer	51,778	46.68%
Democratic	Kimberly McLeod	38,439	34.65%
Democratic	Debra Kerner	20,712	18.67%
Total votes		110,929	100%

Democratic primary runoff results
Party	Candidate	Votes	%
Democratic	Michelle Palmer	39,757	64.23%
Democratic	Kimberly McLeod	22,139	35.77%
Total votes		61,896	100%

==== Libertarian convention ====
Libertarian convention
Party	Candidate	Votes	%
Libertarian	Whitney Bilyeu		
Total votes			100%

==== General election ====
General election results
Party	Candidate	Votes	%
Republican	Will Hickman	371,958	49.76%
Democratic	Michelle Palmer	354,179	47.38%
Libertarian	Whitney Bilyeu	21,414	2.86%
Total votes		747,551	100%

=== Member, District 8 ===
==== Republican primary ====
Republican primary results
Party	Candidate	Votes	%
Republican	Audrey Young	143,209	100%
Total votes		143,209	100%

==== Libertarian convention ====
Libertarian convention
Party	Candidate	Votes	%
Libertarian	Audra Rose Berry		
Total votes			100%

==== General election ====
General election results
Party	Candidate	Votes	%
Republican	Audrey Young	567,058	73.4%
Libertarian	Audra Rose Berry	205,187	26.6%
Total votes		772,245	100%

=== Member, District 9 ===
==== Republican primary ====
Republican primary results
Party	Candidate	Votes	%
Republican	Keven Ellis	208,202	100%
Total votes		208,202	100%

==== Democratic primary ====
Democratic primary results
Party	Candidate	Votes	%
Democratic	Brenda Davis	62,632	100%
Total votes		62,632	100%

==== General election ====
General election results
Party	Candidate	Votes	%
Republican	Keven Ellis (incumbent)	571,322	74.7%
Democratic	Brenda Davis	193,364	25.3%
Total votes		764,686	100%

=== Member, District 10 ===
==== Republican primary ====
Republican primary results
Party	Candidate	Votes	%
Republican	Tom Maynard	134,760	100%
Total votes		134,760	100%

==== Democratic primary ====
Democratic primary results
Party	Candidate	Votes	%
Democratic	Marsha Burnett-Webster	133,862	84.5%
Democratic	Stephen Wyman	24,549	15.5%
Total votes		158,411	100%

==== Libertarian convention ====
Libertarian convention
Party	Candidate	Votes	%
Libertarian	Trip Seibold		
Total votes			100%

==== General election ====
General election results
Party	Candidate	Votes	%
Republican	Tom Maynard (incumbent)	441,700	50.8%
Democratic	Marsha Burnett-Webster	398,453	45.9%
Libertarian	Trip Seibold	28,603	3.3%
Total votes		868,756	100%

=== Member, District 14 ===
==== Republican primary ====
Republican primary results
Party	Candidate	Votes	%
Republican	Sue Melton-Malone	108,389	61.1%
Republican	Maria Berry	69,048	38.9%
Total votes		177,437	100%

==== Democratic primary ====
Democratic primary results
Party	Candidate	Votes	%
Democratic	Greg Alvord	81,833	100%
Total votes		81,833	100%

==== General election ====
General election results
Party	Candidate	Votes	%
Republican	Sue Melton-Malone (incumbent)	582,027	67.8%
Democratic	Greg Alvord	276,303	32.2%
Total votes		858,330	100%

=== Member, District 15 ===
==== Republican primary ====
Republican primary results
Party	Candidate	Votes	%
Republican	Jay Johnson	190,677	100%
Total votes		190,677	100%

==== Democratic primary ====
Democratic primary results
Party	Candidate	Votes	%
Democratic	John Betancourt	42,234	100%
Total votes		42,234	100%

==== General election ====
General election results
Party	Candidate	Votes	%
Republican	Jay Johnson	496,080	77.8%
Democratic	John Betancourt	141,675	22.2%
Total votes		637,755	100%

== Judicial ==
=== Supreme Court of Texas ===
==== Chief Justice ====
2020 Texas Supreme Court Chief Justice election
- November 3, 2020
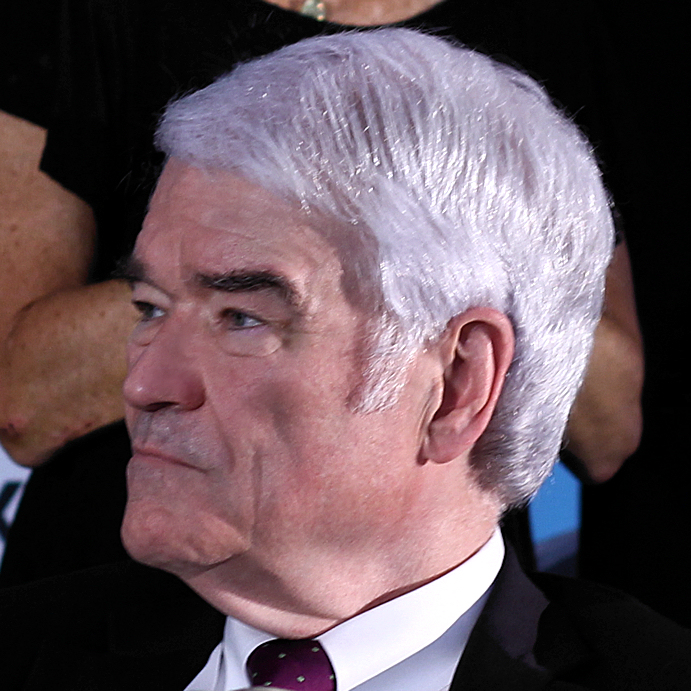

Nominee	Nathan Hecht	Amy Clark Meachum
Party	Republican	Democratic
Popular vote	5,827,085	4,893,402
Percentage	53.0%	44.5%
- Hecht: 40–50% 50–60% 60–70% 70–80% 80–90% 90–100% Meachum: 40–50% 50–60% 60–70% 70–80%
Chief Justice before election
Nathan Hecht
Republican
Elected Chief Justice
Nathan Hecht
Republican

Incumbent Chief Justice Nathan Hecht ran for re-election to his last term.

===== Republican primary =====
====== Candidates ======
- Nathan Hecht, incumbent Chief Justice

====== Results ======
Republican primary results
Party	Candidate	Votes	%
Republican	Nathan Hecht (incumbent)	1,718,096	100.0%
Total votes		1,718,096	100.0%

===== Democratic primary =====
====== Candidates ======
- Amy Clark Meachum, Judge of the Travis County District Court (201st District)
- Jerry Zimmerer, Associate Justice of the Fourteenth Court of Appeals of Texas

====== Results ======
Democratic primary results
Party	Candidate	Votes	%
Democratic	Amy Clark Meachum	1,434,175	80.51%
Democratic	Jerry Zimmerer	347,186	19.49%
Total votes		1,781,361	100.0%

===== General election =====
====== Polling ======
Poll source	Date(s) administered	Sample size	Margin of error	Nathan Hecht (R)	Amy Clark Meachum (D)	Other	Undecided
YouGov/University of Houston	October 13–20, 2020	1,000 (LV)	± 3.1%	48%	40%	3% (Note: Mark Ash (L) with 3%)	9%

====== Results ======
2020 Texas Supreme Court Chief Justice election
Party	Candidate	Votes	%	±%
Republican	Nathan Hecht (incumbent)	5,827,085	52.98%	−6.71%
Democratic	Amy Clark Meachum	4,893,402	44.49%	+7.24%
Libertarian	Mark Ash	277,491	2.52%	−0.54%
Total votes		10,997,978	100.0%	
Republican hold				

==== Place 6 ====
2020 Texas Supreme Court Place 6 election
- November 3, 2020

Nominee	Jane Bland	Kathy Cheng
Party	Republican	Democratic
Popular vote	6,050,534	4,903,527
Percentage	55.2%	44.8%
- Bland: 50–60% 60–70% 70–80% 80–90% 90–100% Cheng: 50–60% 60–70% 70–80%
Justice before election
Jane Bland
Republican
Elected Justice
Jane Bland
Republican

Incumbent Justice Jane Bland was appointed by Governor Abbott in 2019 to replace Jeff Brown. Justice Bland ran to finish the remainder of Brown's term ending in 2024.

===== Republican primary =====
====== Candidates ======
- Jane Bland, incumbent Associate Justice

====== Results ======
Republican primary results
Party	Candidate	Votes	%
Republican	Jane Bland (incumbent)	1,699,236	100.0%
Total votes		1,699,236	100.0%

===== Democratic primary =====
====== Candidates ======
- Kathy Cheng, civil and commercial litigation attorney
- Larry Praeger, family law attorney

====== Results ======
Democratic primary results
Party	Candidate	Votes	%
Democratic	Kathy Cheng	1,310,598	74.52%
Democratic	Larry Praeger	448,114	25.48%
Total votes		1,758,712	100.0%

===== General election =====
====== Polling ======
Poll source	Date(s) administered	Sample size	Margin of error	Jane Bland (R)	Kathy Cheng (D)	Undecided
YouGov/University of Houston	October 13–20, 2020	1,000 (LV)	± 3.1%	49%	40%	11%

====== Results ======
2020 Texas Supreme Court Place 6 election
Party	Candidate	Votes	%	±%
Republican	Jane Bland (incumbent)	6,050,534	55.24%	−5.08%
Democratic	Kathy Cheng	4,903,527	44.76%	+8.27%
Total votes		10,954,061	100.0%	
Republican hold				

==== Place 7 ====
2020 Texas Supreme Court Place 7 election
- November 3, 2020

Nominee	Jeff Boyd	Staci Williams
Party	Republican	Democratic
Popular vote	5,843,420	4,861,649
Percentage	53.3%	44.4%
- Boyd: 40–50% 50–60% 60–70% 70–80% 80–90% 90–100% Williams: 40–50% 50–60% 60–70% 70–80%
Justice before election
Jeff Boyd
Republican
Elected Justice
Jeff Boyd
Republican

Incumbent Justice Jeff Boyd ran for re-election to a second six-year term.

===== Republican primary =====
====== Candidates ======
- Jeff Boyd, incumbent Associate Justice

====== Results ======
Republican primary results
Party	Candidate	Votes	%
Republican	Jeff Boyd (incumbent)	1,702,071	100.0%
Total votes		1,702,071	100.0%

===== Democratic primary =====
====== Candidates ======
- Brandy Voss, McAllen-based appellate attorney
- Staci Williams, Judge of the Dallas County District Court (101st District)

====== Results ======
Democratic primary results
Party	Candidate	Votes	%
Democratic	Staci Williams	1,134,105	65.09%
Democratic	Brandy Voss	608,288	34.91%
Total votes		1,742,393	100.0%

===== General election =====
====== Results ======
2020 Texas Supreme Court Place 7 election
Party	Candidate	Votes	%	±%
Republican	Jeff Boyd (incumbent)	5,843,420	53.31%	−5.59%
Democratic	Staci Williams	4,861,649	44.35%	+6.75%
Libertarian	William Bryan Strange	256,742	2.34%	−0.41%
Total votes		10,961,811	100.0%	
Republican hold				

==== Place 8 ====
2020 Texas Supreme Court Place 8 election
- November 3, 2020

Nominee	Brett Busby	Gisela Triana
Party	Republican	Democratic
Popular vote	5,847,135	4,826,674
Percentage	53.4%	44.1%
- Busby: 40–50% 50–60% 60–70% 70–80% 80–90% 90–100% Triana: 40–50% 50–60% 60–70% 70–80%
Justice before election
Brett Busby
Republican
Elected Justice
Brett Busby
Republican

Incumbent Justice Brett Busby ran for a full six-year term after being appointed by Governor Abbott in 2019 due to the retirement of Phil Johnson.

==== Republican primary ====
===== Candidates =====
- Brett Busby, incumbent Associate Justice

====== Results ======
Republican primary results
Party	Candidate	Votes	%
Republican	Brett Busby (incumbent)	1,692,583	100.0%
Total votes		1,692,583	100.0%

==== Democratic primary ====
===== Candidates =====
- Peter Kelly, Associate Justice of the First Court of Appeals of Texas
- Gisela Triana, Associate Justice of the Third Court of Appeals of Texas

====== Results ======
Democratic primary results
Party	Candidate	Votes	%
Democratic	Gisela Triana	1,251,611	72.04%
Democratic	Peter Kelly	485,697	27.96%
Total votes		1,737,308	100.0%

==== General election ====
===== Results =====
2020 Texas Supreme Court Place 8 election
Party	Candidate	Votes	%	±%
Republican	Brett Busby (incumbent)	5,847,135	53.40%	−25.40%
Democratic	Gisela Triana	4,826,674	44.08%	N/A
Libertarian	Tom Oxford	274,959	2.51%	−6.73%
Total votes		10,948,768	100.0%	

=== Court of Criminal Appeals ===
==== Place 3 ====
2020 Texas Court of Criminal Appeals Place 3 election
- November 3, 2020

Nominee	Bert Richardson	Elizabeth Davis Frizell
Party	Republican	Democratic
Popular vote	5,953,924	4,964,460
Percentage	54.5%	45.5%
- County results Richardson: 50–60% 60–70% 70–80% 80–90% 90–100% Frizell: 50–60% 60–70% 70–80%
Judge before election
Bert Richardson
Republican
Elected Judge
Bert Richardson
Republican

Incumbent Judge Bert Richardson ran for re-election to a second six-year term.

===== Republican primary =====
====== Candidates ======
- Gina Parker, Waco-based criminal defense attorney, former Texas Department of Licensing and Regulation Commissioner
- Bert Richardson, incumbent judge

====== Results ======
Republican primary results
Party	Candidate	Votes	%
Republican	Bert Richardson (incumbent)	897,496	51.84%
Republican	Gina Parker	833,893	48.16%
Total votes		1,731,389	100.0%

===== Democratic primary =====
====== Candidates ======
- William Pieratt Demond, constitutional rights attorney
- Elizabeth Davis Frizell, former Judge of the Dallas County Criminal District Court (2007–2017)
- Dan Wood, Terrell-based appellate attorney

====== Results ======
Democratic primary results
Party	Candidate	Votes	%
Democratic	Elizabeth Davis Frizell	1,184,280	68.71%
Democratic	Dan Wood	331,715	19.24%
Democratic	William Pieratt Demond	207,651	12.05%
Total votes		1,723,646	100.0%

===== General election =====
====== Polling ======
Poll source	Date(s) administered	Sample size	Margin of error	Bert Richardson (R)	Elizabeth Davis Frizell (D)	Undecided
YouGov/University of Houston	October 13–20, 2020	1,000 (LV)	± 3.1%	48%	38%	14%

====== Results ======
2020 Texas Court of Criminal Appeals Place 3 election
Party	Candidate	Votes	%	±%
Republican	Bert Richardson (incumbent)	5,953,924	54.53%	−5.32%
Democratic	Elizabeth Davis Frizell	4,964,460	45.47%	+8.93%
Total votes		10,918,384	100.0%	
Republican hold				

==== Place 4 ====
2020 Texas Court of Criminal Appeals Place 4 election
- November 3, 2020

Nominee	Kevin Yeary	Tina Clinton
Party	Republican	Democratic
Popular vote	5,974,016	4,924,207
Percentage	54.8%	45.2%
- County results Yeary: 50–60% 60–70% 70–80% 80–90% 90–100% Clinton: 50–60% 60–70% 70–80%
Judge before election
Kevin Yeary
Republican
Elected Judge
Kevin Yeary
Republican

Incumbent Judge Kevin Yeary ran for re-election to a second six-year term.

===== Republican primary =====
====== Candidates ======
- Kevin Yeary, incumbent judge

====== Results ======
Republican primary results
Party	Candidate	Votes	%
Republican	Kevin Yeary (incumbent)	1,679,193	100.0%
Total votes		1,679,193	100.0%

===== Democratic primary =====
====== Candidates ======
- Tina Yoo Clinton, Judge of the Dallas County Criminal Court (No. 1)
- Steven Miears, Grapevine-based criminal appellate attorney

====== Results ======
Democratic primary results
Party	Candidate	Votes	%
Democratic	Tina Clinton	1,380,356	80.50%
Democratic	Steven Miears	334,474	19.50%
Total votes		1,714,830	100.0%

===== General election =====
====== Results ======
2020 Texas Court of Criminal Appeals Place 4 election
Party	Candidate	Votes	%	±%
Republican	Kevin Patrick Yeary (incumbent)	5,974,016	54.82%	−21.4%
Democratic	Tina Yoo Clinton	4,924,207	45.18%	N/A
Total votes		10,898,223	100.0%	
Republican hold				

==== Place 9 ====
2020 Texas Court of Criminal Appeals Place 9 election
- November 3, 2020

Nominee	David Newell	Brandon Birmingham
Party	Republican	Democratic
Popular vote	6,015,909	4,863,142
Percentage	55.3%	44.7%
- County results Newell: 50–60% 60–70% 70–80% 80–90% 90–100% Birmingham: 50–60% 60–70%
Judge before election
David Newell
Republican
Elected Judge
David Newell
Republican

Incumbent Judge David Newell ran for re-election to a second six-year term.

===== Republican primary =====
====== Candidates ======
- David Newell, incumbent judge

====== Results ======
Republican primary results
Party	Candidate	Votes	%
Republican	David Newell (incumbent)	1,676,841	100.0%
Total votes		1,676,841	100.0%

===== Democratic primary =====
====== Candidates ======
- Brandon Birmingham, Judge of the Dallas County District Court (292nd District)

====== Results ======
Democratic primary results
Party	Candidate	Votes	%
Democratic	Brandon Birmingham	1,570,444	100.0%
Total votes		1,570,444	100.0%

===== General election =====
====== Results ======
2020 Texas Court of Criminal Appeals Place 9 election
Party	Candidate	Votes	%	±%
Republican	David Newell (incumbent)	6,015,909	55.30%	−22.99%
Democratic	Brandon Birmingham	4,863,142	44.70%	N/A
Total votes		10,879,051	100.0%	
Republican hold				

== Legislature ==
All 150 seats of the Texas House of Representatives and 16 of 31 seats of the Texas State Senate were up for election.

=== Senate ===
Before the election, the composition of the state senate was:

Party	# of seats
Republican	19
Democratic	12
Total	31

After the election, the composition of the state senate was:

Party	# of seats
Republican	18
Democratic	13
Total	31

=== House of Representatives ===
Before and after the election, the composition of the state house was:

Party	# of seats
Republican	83
Democratic	67
Total	150

== See also ==
- Postal voting in the United States, 2020
- Bilingual elections requirement for Texas (per Voting Rights Act Amendments of 2006)

== Notes ==
Partisan clients
