= Hatton W. Sumners Foundation =

Nonprofit organization in Dallas, United States

The Hatton W. Sumners Foundation awards grants, scholarships, research and educational opportunities to students. It seeks to help students "grasp the fundamental principles of democracy and help shape governmental policies". The organization believes uninformed, inactive citizens are a threat to American liberty and emphasis must be placed on promoting the study and teaching of the science of self-government

== History ==
The Hatton W. Sumners Foundation was created in 1949 by a gift from former Congressman Hatton William Sumners (May 30, 1875 – April 19, 1962). A Democratic Congressman from the Dallas, Texas area, serving from 1913 to 1947, Sumners rose to become chairman of the powerful House Judiciary Committee. He stood against President Franklin Delano Roosevelt by introducing The 1937 Retirement Act to prevent Roosevelt from packing the Supreme Court with Justices that would support his New Deal programs.

In 2018, the Hatton W. Sumners Foundation approved $2,212,365 in grants to 35 non-profit organizations and educational institutions. In the history of the foundation, more than $81 million has been used to endow scholarship programs at Southern Methodist University Dedman School of Law, Oklahoma City University School of Law, Howard Payne University, Schreiner University, Texas Wesleyan University, and Austin College

== Scholarships ==
Scholarships are awarded based on merit and Sumners Scholars are selected based on academics, civic responsibility and leadership potential.

Scholars gain access to speakers at the Hatton W. Sumners Distinguished Lecture Series. Past speakers have included President Gerald Ford, George W. Bush, Queen Noor of Jordan, Supreme Court Justice Clarence Thomas, Israeli Prime Minister Benjamin Netanyahu, Senator Daniel Patrick Moynihan, Czech President Vaclav Klaus, John Stossel of ABC's 20/20, and Bill O'Reilly of Fox News.

== Sumners Scholars Alumni ==
- David Drumm, Partner, Carrington, Coleman, Sloman & Blumenthal, L.L.P
- Nathan Hecht, Chief Justice, Supreme Court of Texas
- Joseph Foran, Founder, chairman of the board, Matador Resources Company
- Lee Ann Dauphinot, Former Justice Texas Second District Court of Appeals
- Charles Moore, Esquire, Chancellor, Keleher & Mc Leod, P.A.
