= Yeary =

Yeary is a surname. Notable people with the surname include:

- Jimmy Yeary, American singer and songwriter
- Kevin Patrick Yeary (born 1966), American judge
- Mark Yeary, American engineer
