= Gina M. Benavides =

American judge

Texas Thirteenth Court of Appeals Justice
- In office January 1, 2007 – December 31, 2024

Personal details
- Born: December 6, 1962 (age 63) Laredo, Texas, U.S.
- Party: Democratic
- Education: Mary Carroll High School in Corpus Christi The University of Texas at Austin University of Houston Law Center
- Occupation: Attorney; Judge

Georgina "Gina" Martinez Benavides (born December 6, 1962) is an American attorney who served as a justice of the Texas Thirteenth Court of Appeals based in Corpus Christi and Edinburg. She was first elected in 2006, and re-elected in 2012 and 2018. Benavides sought election to the Thirteenth Court's Chief Justice position in 2024, and retired from the court after losing to the Republican candidate. Benavides is a member of the Democratic Party and resides in McAllen, Texas.

== Early life and education ==
Justice Benavides was born in Laredo, Texas, and grew up in Corpus Christi, Texas. She is a 1981 graduate of Mary Carroll High School. Upon graduation, Benavides attended the University of Texas at Austin, where she graduated in 1985 with a bachelor's degree in business administration. After receiving her undergraduate degree, Benavides enrolled at the University of Houston Law Center. During law school, Benavides was active in the Hispanic Law Students Association and the civil practice clinic. Benavides obtained her J.D. degree and law license in 1988.

== Private practice ==
Before joining the Thirteenth Court of Appeals, Justice Benavides was a litigator with over 17 years of courtroom experience. She began her legal career at the Adams & Graham Law Firm in Harlingen, Texas, in 1988. At this primarily defense firm, she tried over 30 cases throughout the state of Texas in the areas of toxic tort, products liability, commercial litigation, and personal injury. After 12 years, she joined the law firm of Gonzalez & Associates, P.C. in McAllen, Texas, where she continued to litigate but as a plaintiffs' lawyer. She also began an active appellate practice at this time.

As a private attorney, Justice Benavides was recognized in Texas Monthly as a Super Lawyer in 2003 and 2004 by her peers as one of the best lawyers in the state of Texas.

She also served as a minority director for the State Bar of Texas. She was president of the Mexican-American Bar Association of Texas and the Cameron County Bar Association, as well as a vice-president of the Texas Association of Defense Counsel. Her service also includes stints on numerous committees for the State Bar of Texas, including Continuing Legal Education and Law Focused Education.

== Judicial career ==
Justice Benavides was first elected to the Thirteenth Court of Appeals in 2006 and was re-elected in 2012 and 2018. Prior to her 2012 re-election, she was endorsed by the Corpus Christi Caller-Times. The newspaper's editorial highlighted Justice Benavides's experience, "folksy manner" and "impressive intellect."

After her first year on the Court, Justice Benavides was bestowed the honor of "Latina Judge of the Year" by the National Hispanic Bar Association at their annual meeting in Puerto Rico in 2007.

In 2008, she was appointed to serve on the Texas Center for the Judiciary Board of Directors (the "Texas Center"). The Texas Center was established in 1973 to provide continuing judicial education programs for the state's judiciary and support personnel. The Texas Center pursues its mission of judicial excellence through education by providing leadership education and training so that a qualified and a knowledgeable judiciary may administer justice with fairness, efficiency, and integrity. In 2010, she was elected Chair-Elect of the Texas Center by her fellow judges and became chair at the annual meeting in September 2011. The last time a judge from Region 5, which encompasses South Texas, held this position was in 1992. Justice Benavides is the first Hispanic woman to hold this position.

In 2010, the Texas Supreme Court appointed Justice Benavides to the Texas Access to Justice Commission. This commission was created by the Supreme Court of Texas in 2001 to develop and implement initiatives to expand access to, and enhance the quality of, justice in civil matters for low-income Texans.

In February 2012, the State Bar of Texas through President Bob Black appointed a new task force dubbed "Solutions 2012" to deal with decreasing funding for legal access and rising numbers of unrepresented (pro se) litigants, and the implications of these developments for the Texas legal system. He called upon Justice Benavides to serve on the committee.

Justice Benavides is frequently asked to serve as a speaker and presenter of papers throughout the State of Texas.

Justice Benavides was honored to be the keynote speaker at the Red Mass in Brownsville, Texas. The Red Mass is a mass celebrated annually for judges, attorneys, law school professors, students, government officials, and all those who seek justice. She has also spoken at several candlelight vigils against domestic violence and abuse.

Justice Benavides is committed to youth and youth education. She judges the annual "We the People" Constitution Competition, UIL Mock Trial and Moot Court competitions, and the Texas Young Lawyer's Association Moot Court Competition at the State Bar Annual Meeting. She is also a frequent career-day speaker.

Benavides is active in the National Association of Women Judges, (NAWJ) and served on the Judicial Independence Committee, Judicial Selection Committee, and Judicial Education Committee. She also continues to be involved in the Mexican-American Bar Association (MABA) of Texas, an organization she served as president when she was an attorney in private practice.

== Election results ==
Texas Thirteenth Court of Appeals: Place 5, 2012
| Party | Candidate | Votes | % |
|---|---|---|---|
| Democratic | Gina M. Benavides (Incumbent) | 249,698 | 57.51 |
| Republican | Doug Norman | 184,473 | 42.49 |
| Total votes | | 434,171 | 100.0 |

Texas Thirteenth Court of Appeals: Place 5, 2006
| Party | Candidate | Votes | % |
|---|---|---|---|
| Democratic | Gina M. Benavides | 158,938 | 100.00 |
| Total votes | | 158,938 | 100.0 |

== Texas Supreme Court Candidacy ==
In 2014, Justice Benavides was the Democratic candidate for Place 7 on the nine-member Texas Supreme Court. She ran against incumbent Jeff Boyd of Austin (Republican), Don Fulton of Fort Worth (Libertarian), and Charles Edwin Waterbury of Dallas (Green).

On February 12, 2014, the State Bar of Texas released the results of its 2014 Judicial Poll. Justice Benavides received the most votes in the supreme court race for Place 7 race with 4,039 votes. Additionally, she was the only non-incumbent candidate for the Texas Supreme Court to receive the most votes for each place on the ballot.

Benavides was defeated in the election by incumbent Jeff Boyd.

Supreme Court of Texas: Place 7, 2014
| Party | Candidate | Votes | % |
|---|---|---|---|
| Republican | Jeff Boyd (Incumbent) | 2,711,363 | 58.90 |
| Democratic | Gina M. Benavides | 1,731,031 | 37.60 |
| Libertarian | Don Fulton | 126,725 | 2.75 |
| Green | Charles E. Waterbury | 34,493 | 0.75 |
| Total votes | | 4,603,612 | 100.0 |
