= Deborah Hankinson =

American judge (born 1953)

Justice of the Supreme Court of Texas
- In office October 28, 1997 – December 31, 2002
- Preceded by: John Cornyn
- Succeeded by: Dale Wainwright

Personal details
- Born: February 3, 1953 (age 73)
- Party: Republican
- Education: University of Texas at Dallas; Southern Methodist University School of Law (JD)
- Profession: Attorney, judge

Deborah G. Hankinson (born February 3, 1953) is an American attorney who served as a justice of the Supreme Court of Texas from 1997 to 2002.

== Early life and career ==
Hankinson was born on February 3, 1953. She earned a special education degree from the University of Texas at Dallas in 1977, and initially worked as an educator for children with developmental disabilities. She later received her J.D. degree from Southern Methodist University Dedman School of Law. In 1995, Hankinson was appointed as a judge of the Fifth District Court of Appeals located in Dallas, Texas. On October 28, 1997, she was appointed by Governor George W. Bush as a justice of the Supreme Court of Texas. Hankinson remained on the bench until December 31, 2002. She returned to private practice and founded her own appellate law firm in Dallas.

== See also ==
- List of justices of the Texas Supreme Court

Political offices
Preceded by John Cornyn	Justice of the Texas Supreme Court; 1997–2002	Succeeded by Dale Wainwright
