= Kristen Hawkins =

Justice of the Texas Supreme Court
- Elect
- Assuming office January 2027
- Succeeding: Kyle D. Hawkins

Personal details
- Born: 1974 or 1975 (age 51–52)
- Party: Democratic
- Education: University of Texas, Austin (BA); South Texas College of Law (JD)
- Website: Campaign website

Kristen Brauchle Hawkins (born 1974/1975) is an American attorney and judge serving as a state district court judge in Harris County. On November 3, 2026, she was elected as a Justice of the Texas Supreme Court, defeating incumbent Kyle D. Hawkins. She is scheduled to take office in January 2027.

A member of the Democratic Party, Hawkins was elected to the 11th District Court in 2016. She was re-elected in 2020 and 2024.

== Early life and education ==
Hawkins grew up in Houston and graduated from Alief Hastings High School. She earned a bachelor's degree in government and Spanish from the University of Texas at Austin and a Juris Doctor from the South Texas College of Law. Hawkins was licensed by the State Bar of Texas in 1999 and is certified by the Texas Board of Legal Specialization in civil trial law, judicial administration, and personal injury trial law. She was named a Jurist of the Year by the Texas Chapter of the American Board of Trial Advocates in 2021.

Legal offices
Preceded by Kyle D. Hawkins	Justice of the Texas Supreme Court; Taking office 2027	Elect
