= Tom Price (judge) =

American judge

Thomas Brian "Tom" Price

Judge of the Texas Court of Criminal Appeals
- In office 1997–2015
- Preceded by: Frank Maloney
- Succeeded by: Bert Richardson

Personal details
- Born: 1945 (age 80–81) Des Moines, Iowa
- Party: Republican
- Children: Jan and Brian Price
- Education: East Texas State University; Baylor University Law School

Thomas Brian Price, known as Tom Price (born 1945), is a Texas lawyer who served as a judge of the Texas Court of Criminal Appeals from 1997 to 2015.

Born in Des Moines, Iowa, Price came to Texas as a child, graduated from Highland Park High School in University Park, Texas, and served in the United States Marine Corps early in the Vietnam War. He received his undergraduate degree from East Texas State University, and his Juris Doctor degree from Baylor University Law School in 1970.

Legal offices
Preceded by Frank Maloney	Judge of the Texas Court of Criminal Appeals; Place 3 1997–2015	Succeeded by Bert Richardson
