= Rebeca Huddle =

American judge (born 1973)

Justice of the Supreme Court of Texas
- Incumbent
- Assumed office October 30, 2020
- Appointed by: Greg Abbott
- Preceded by: Paul W. Green

Personal details
- Born: Rebeca Aizpuru Huddle; July 7, 1973 (age 53) El Paso, Texas, U.S.
- Party: Republican
- Education: Stanford University (BA); University of Texas at Austin (JD)
- Website: Office website Campaign website

Rebeca Aizpuru Huddle (born July 7, 1973) is an American lawyer who has been a justice of the Supreme Court of Texas since 2020. A member of the Republican Party, she served as a justice of the First Court of Appeals of Texas from 2011 to 2017.

On October 15, 2020, Governor Greg Abbott nominated Huddle to the Texas Supreme Court to replace Justice Paul W. Green, who retired from the court in August. Huddle was sworn into office on October 30, 2020.

== Biography ==
Huddle was born in El Paso, Texas and attended Austin High School in El Paso. She received a Bachelor of Arts in political science from Stanford University and her Juris Doctor from the University of Texas School of Law.

=== Private practice ===
After graduating law school, Huddle became a partner in Baker Botts LLP's trial department, focusing on civil litigation. She worked in that position until her appointment to the First Court of Appeals in Houston.

Once Huddle left the Court of Appeals, she returned to Baker Botts and became the partner-in-charge of their Houston office, focusing on commercial litigation and appeals. She left that position once she was appointed to the Texas Supreme Court.

=== State court service ===
In 2011, then-Texas Governor Rick Perry appointed Huddle to the nine-member First Court of Appeals, replacing Elsa Alcala, who had been elevated to the Texas Court of Criminal Appeals. The First and Fourteenth Court of Appeals, both based in Houston's 1910 Harris County Courthouse, divide the caseload of appeals from Harris County and nine surrounding counties. They hear both civil and criminal matters and each issue about 700 decisions per year. The term of the justice Huddle replaced expired at the end of 2012, so she chose to stand for election in November 2012 to a new six-year term. She won her election with 53.4% of the vote. Huddle left the court in June 2017 (before her term would have expired in 2018) and returned to private practice at Baker Botts.

Huddle is a member of the State Bar of Texas, Houston Bar Association, and the Mexican American Bar Association of Houston.

Legal offices
Preceded by Paul W. Green	Justice of the Supreme Court of Texas; 2020–present	Incumbent
