= J. Brett Busby =

American judge (born 1973)

Brett Busby

Justice of the Supreme Court of Texas
- Incumbent
- Assumed office March 20, 2019
- Appointed by: Greg Abbott
- Preceded by: Phil Johnson
- Succeeded by: Gisela Triana (elect)

Personal details
- Born: April 12, 1973 (age 53)
- Education: Duke University (BA); Columbia University (JD)
- Website: Official website; Campaign website

Justin Brett Busby (born April 12, 1973) is a current justice of the Supreme Court of Texas, having served since 2019. A member of the Republican Party, he served on the 14th Court of Appeals of Texas from 2013 to 2019.

On February 21, 2019, Texas Governor Greg Abbott nominated Busby to a vacancy on the Texas Supreme Court resulting from Justice Phil Johnson's retirement. Busby was unanimously confirmed by the Texas Senate on March 20 and sworn into office that same day.

== Biography ==
Busby received a Bachelor of Arts degree in public policy and international affairs from Duke University and his Juris Doctor from Columbia Law School.

Before entering private practice, Busby served as a law clerk to Judge Gerald Bard Tjoflat of the United States Court of Appeals for the Eleventh Circuit, to retired Associate Justice Byron White of the Supreme Court of the United States, and to Associate Justice John Paul Stevens.

== State court service ==
Before his appointment to the SCOTX in 2019, Busby served as a justice of the nine-member Fourteenth Court of Appeals in Houston from 2012 through December 31, 2018. The First and Fourteenth Court of Appeals are both housed in the 1910 Harris County Courthouse and divide the caseload of appeals from the ten surrounding counties, including Harris County, the State's most populous one. They hear both civil and criminal matters and each issue about 1,100 per year. Busby appreciated the variety of the caseload: “There are very few generalists left in the law these days, but appellate judges are some of them. I really do enjoy that.”

The Houston Courts of Appeals function as a stepping stone for service on the Texas Supreme Court. Supreme Court Justice Eva Guzman, like Busby, previously served as a member of the Fourteenth Court of Appeals. Justice Jane Bland came to the SCOTX from the First Court of Appeals, with a very brief interlude as an appellate lawyer in private practice with Vinson & Elkins. Her predecessor, Jeff Brown, also hails from Houston, and had previously served on a Harris County district court bench, as did Bland and Guzman. Democratic challengers in Texas Supreme Court races typically also hail from Harris County.

Busby ran for re-election in 2018, but was narrowly defeated by his Democratic opponent, Jerry Zimmerer. All of his Republican colleagues who were seeking re-election in Houston that year were also defeated.

Busby commented on his excitement having been nominated, since the Supreme Court had been “grading his papers” during his six years as a state appellate judge. Busby and Bland had an opportunity to double-check the work of the new arrivals on the Houston Court of Appeals, though not in cases that were before them in 2018, from which they had to stand recused.

Busby is Board Certified in Civil Appellate Law by the Texas Board of Legal Specialization and served as Chair of the Appellate Section of the State Bar of Texas.

== See also ==
- List of law clerks for the fourth seat of the Supreme Court of the United States
- List of law clerks for the sixth seat of the Supreme Court of the United States

Legal offices
Preceded by Phil Johnson	Justice of the Supreme Court of Texas; 2019–present	Incumbent
