= Paul W. Green =

American judge

Justice of the Supreme Court of Texas
- In office January 1, 2005 – August 31, 2020
- Preceded by: Steven Wayne Smith
- Succeeded by: Rebeca Huddle

Judge of the Fourth Court of Appeals of Texas
- In office January 1, 1995 – December 31, 2004

Personal details
- Born: March 6, 1952 (age 74) San Antonio, Texas, U.S.
- Party: Republican
- Education: Alamo Heights High School (1970) University of Texas at Austin (BA) (1974); St. Mary's University (JD) (1977)

Paul Warren Green (born March 6, 1952) is a former justice of the Supreme Court of Texas. He served on the court from November 2, 2004, to August 31, 2020.

== Background ==
Green graduated with a Bachelor of Arts degree in Business Administration in 1974 from the University of Texas at Austin and received his Juris Doctor in 1977 from St. Mary's University School of Law in San Antonio. Prior to joining the Supreme Court, Green was a justice for ten years on the Fourth Court of Appeals of Texas, based in San Antonio.

== 2004 election ==
Green won the Republican nomination to his seat on the Court in a contested primary against then-Justice Steven Wayne Smith. Smith, though a new member of the Court at the time, was opposed by then Texas Governor Rick Perry. U.S. Senator John Cornyn, a former Texas Supreme Court justice himself for seven years, also supported Green over Smith. In 2006, Smith sought to return to the Court by entering the primary contest against recent Perry appointee Don Willett, but Willett won the contested primary vote by a single percentage point.

== 2010 election ==
Green ran for re-election in 2010. With 60 percent of the vote, he defeated William Moody and Tom Oxford in the general election.

== 2016 election ==
Green won re-nomination in the Republican primary on March 1 against Rick Green (no relation), a former member of the Texas House of Representatives from Dripping Springs who is affiliated with David Barton in the group WallBuilders. Justice Green prevailed over Rick Green, 1,077,507 votes (52.1 percent) to 991,785 votes (47.9 percent). Green then defeated the Democrat Dori Contreras Garza in the November 8 general election, 4,758,334 (54.3 percent) to her 3,608,634 (41.2 percent). The Libertarian Party nominee, Tom Oxford, an earlier opponent of Justice Green, polled 288,504 votes (3.3 percent), and the Green candidate, Charles E. Waterbury received 107,731 (1.2 percent).

== Retirement ==
In July 2020, Green announced his retirement from the court, effective August 31, 2020.

Legal offices
Preceded by Steven Wayne Smith	Justice of the Texas Supreme Court; Place 5; 2005–2020	Succeeded by Rebeca Huddle
