= James P. Sullivan (judge) =

American judge

James Sullivan
- Sullivan in 2026

Justice of the Texas Supreme Court
- Incumbent
- Assumed office January 7, 2025
- Appointed by: Greg Abbott
- Preceded by: Jimmy Blacklock
- Succeeded by: Chari Kelly (elect)

Personal details
- Born: James Patrick Sullivan
- Party: Republican
- Education: Rice University (BA); Harvard University (JD)
- Website: Official website; Campaign website

James Patrick Sullivan (born 1980 or 1981) is an American attorney and judge serving as a justice of the Texas Supreme Court since 2025.

== Early life ==
Sullivan graduated from Rice University (BA) and Harvard Law School (JD). He was an editor on the Harvard Law Review.

== Career ==
Sullivan was a law clerk to Judge Thomas B. Griffith on the U.S. Court of Appeals for the D.C. Circuit, an adjunct professor at George Mason University, and an appellate litigator in private practice.

In 2021, Sullivan was appointed deputy counsel for Texas Governor Greg Abbott, having previously served under (then-Texas Attorney General) Abbott as assistant solicitor general.

In January 2025, he was appointed by the governor to fill a Texas Supreme Court vacancy, with the appointment set to expire December 31, 2026. Chief Justice Jimmy Blacklock said, "James Sullivan is a brilliant, hard-working lawyer who has served the People of Texas with distinction for many years. He will make an excellent addition to our state’s Supreme Court." Sullivan has often quoted comical fictional characters in his opinions, including The Big Lebowski and Saturday Night Live.

Sullivan ran to retain the seat in the 2026 Texas Supreme Court election, but was defeated in the November general election by Democratic challenger Chari Kelly, who received 52.3% of the vote to Sullivan's 47.7%.

On November 5, 2026, President Donald Trump announced that he would nominate Sullivan to serve on the United States District Court for the Western District of Texas.

On November 18, 2026, under questioning from Senator Chris Coons during his Senate confirmation hearing, Sullivan refused to answer whether the 22nd Amendment to the United States Constitution prevented Donald Trump from being elected to a third term as President of the United States. Senator John Kennedy accused Sullivan of "talking in circles" when pressed to explain whether his originalist judicial philosophy would allow ear cropping.

He is a member of the Federalist Society and the Teneo Network.

Legal offices
Preceded by Jimmy Blacklock	Justice of the Texas Supreme Court; 2025–present	Succeeded by Chari Kelly; Elect
