= Steven Wayne Smith =

American judge

Justice of the Supreme Court of Texas
- In office November 2002 – January 2005
- Preceded by: Xavier Rodriguez
- Succeeded by: Paul W. Green

Personal details
- Born: October 26, 1961 (age 64) Everman, Texas, U.S.
- Party: Republican
- Spouse: Susan Hunter Smith
- Children: 2
- Education: University of Texas at Arlington (BBA); University of Texas at Austin (JD)
- Occupation: Attorney, judge

Steven Wayne Smith (born October 26, 1961) is a Republican former Texas Supreme Court justice, who was defeated for renomination in 2004 through the active opposition of then-Governor Rick Perry. He was unseated by Paul W. Green. Smith again lost – very narrowly – a bid for nomination to the court in the March 7, 2006, GOP primary, when Perry again opposed his candidacy.

Smith served on the Texas high court from November 2002 through January 2005.

== Education and career ==
A fifth-generation Texan, Smith graduated from Everman High School, which is located in south Tarrant County. He attended the University of Texas at Arlington, where he received a bachelor of business administration degree in finance, the first member of his extended family to have graduated from college. Smith attended the University of Texas Law School, where he concentrated on federal law. He graduated with honors in 1986.

After graduation, Smith worked as a bill analyst for the Texas Senate and as a staff attorney, first for the Office of the Texas Secretary of State and then for the Texas Legislative Council. He spent three years at the legislative council and worked on redistricting issues and judicial selection. There, he met his wife, the former Susan Hunter, who was also on the legal staff.

"My judicial philosophy probably comes as much from working at the legislature as from anything. ... I developed a real appreciation for what goes into making public policy. The legislature is the policy-making branch. Courts should defer to the legislature, unless there's a clear constitutional reason" otherwise, said Smith.

While he was on the Supreme Court, Smith authored 16 published opinions, including the court's landmark decision in Texas Department of Protective and Regulatory Services v. Mega Child Care. His work was lauded by then Chief Justice Wallace Jefferson.

== Election history ==
=== Primary election of 1998 ===
In 1998, Smith ran for the Republican nomination for Place 4 on the Texas Supreme Court. He opposed the then=incumbent Deborah Hankinson, who had been appointed to the body in 1997 by then-Governor George W. Bush. In the Republican primary, Smith lost to Hankinson by 59.41 to 40.58% of the vote.

=== Election of 2002 ===
Smith was elected to the court in 2002 by first defeating Xavier Rodriguez, an appointee of Governor Rick Perry, in the Republican primary. Smith polled 306,730 votes (53.49%) to Rodriguez's 266,648 ballots (46.50%). Rodriguez spent $558,000, called himself a "moderate", and lost; Smith spent $9,500, called himself a "conservative", and won in an upset.

Smith defeated Democrat Margaret Mirabal in the November general election. He polled 2,331,140 votes (54.09%), to Mirabal's 1,978,081 ballots (45.90%).

The 2002 election was for the unexpired portion of a normal six-year term. The term began with the re-election of Greg Abbott to the seat in 1998. Under the Texas Constitution, after he resigned in 2001 to run for Texas attorney general, an election had to be scheduled for fall 2002 for the remaining two years of Abbott's original term. Thus, Smith had to run for re-election in 2004.

=== Primary election of 2004 ===
Perry and U.S. Senator John Cornyn opposed Smith's candidacy and he eventually lost the primary to Green. Green was unopposed in the 2004 general election. Green still holds this seat on the Supreme Court.

A controversial email that Smith sent out responding to Green's attack that Smith was short on credentials may have backfired and cost Smith some support. While touting his own academic achievements at the University of Texas School of Law, Smith disparaged Green's academic achievements, namely that Green had graduated from St. Mary's University School of Law in San Antonio, a smaller and less well-known law school. Senator John Cornyn is a St. Mary's alumnus. Dean Bill Piatt of St. Mary's blasted Smith, saying that it was inappropriate for a sitting Supreme Court justice to belittle one of the law schools in the State of Texas. Piatt widely distributed a letter that he had written to Smith to many alumni of St. Mary's and others in the legal community. Smith wrote a conciliatory response letter to Piatt, but did not publicize that letter.

=== Primary election of 2006 ===
On January 3, 2006, Smith announced that he would enter the March 7 Republican primary for Place 2 on the Texas Supreme Court. He opposed Justice Don Willett of Austin, a Baylor and Duke University Law School graduate who was appointed to the bench in fall 2005 by Governor Perry. Bush announced on January 19, 2006, that he was supporting Willett.

In 2004, Senator Kay Bailey Hutchison supported Smith's re-election, but she endorsed Willett in the 2006 race. Cornyn and Texas Attorney General Greg Abbott, himself a former Texas Supreme Court justice, also endorsed Willett. The San Antonio Express-News endorsed Willett, but the Fort Worth Star-Telegram backed Smith. Smith lost to Willett by 4,979 votes.

== Primary election of 2016 ==
Ten years after his last defeat for the state Supreme Court, Smith entered the Republican primary for the Place 5 seat on the Texas Court of Criminal Appeals being vacated by Republican Cheryl Johnson. He ran third among four candidates and finished with 393,458 votes (19.6%). The second-place candidate, Brent Webster of Williamson County, with 410,530 votes (20.5%), led Smith by 17,072 votes and secured the runoff berth against the top candidate, Scott Walker, who polled 832,685 (41.5%). Walker did virtually no campaigning, received no newspaper endorsements, funded no advertising, and entrusted his campaign to his son. He shares the name of the Republican governor of Wisconsin, who withdrew from the 2016 presidential election. Walker may have hence prevailed in the judicial race on the basis of a well-known name. Walker attributed his strong showing to divine intervention: "I spent a lot of time praying. God really blessed me with a great victory." In last place was Sid Harle, the former prosecutor in the Bexar County district attorney's office and a 27-year district court judge from San Antonio, who drew 370,766 votes (18.5%). Walker subsequently handily defeated Webster in their runoff contest, 207,195 (57.9%) to 150,722 (42.1%). The runoff attracted only 2.5% of all registered voters statewide. Walker now faces Dori Contreras Garza, who polled 1,020,753 primary votes running unopposed in the Democratic primary.

In his campaign, Smith had advocated consolidating the state Supreme Court with the Court of Criminal Appeals, both of which have nine members elected statewide, to reduce the number of judges required by the state. Smith is a former general counsel to the Texas Legal Foundation. In 2016, he was the editor of www.TexasLegalGuide.com.

Legal offices
Preceded by Xavier Rodriguez	Texas Supreme Court Justice, Place 5; 2002–2005	Succeeded by Paul W. Green
