= Maggie Ellis =

American attorney and judge

Chief Justice of the Texas Supreme Court
- Elect
- Assuming office January 2027
- Succeeding: Jimmy Blacklock

Personal details
- Born: 1967 or 1968 (age 58–59)
- Party: Democratic
- Education: Austin Community College (AA); University of Texas, Austin (BS); Baylor University (JD)
- Website: Campaign website

Maggie Jane Ellis (born 1967/1968) is an American attorney and judge serving as a justice on the Third Court of Appeals of Texas in Austin. On November 3, 2026, she was elected as Chief Justice of the Texas Supreme Court, defeating incumbent Jimmy Blacklock. She is the first openly LGBTQ+ person elected to statewide office in Texas, as well as the state's first elected woman chief justice. She is scheduled to take office in January 2027.

Ellis was elected to the Third Court of Appeals in 2024, becoming the first openly LGBTQ woman elected to a Texas appellate court.

== Early life and education ==
Ellis experienced homelessness as a child and attended numerous different elementary schools in three states. At one point, she was abandoned by her mother. Ellis has described her baby sister as having also been her daughter for the past 30+ years.

Ellis earned an Associate of Arts degree in Spanish from Austin Community College, a Bachelor of Science in Applied Learning and Development from the University of Texas at Austin, and a Juris Doctor (JD) from Baylor Law School. Ellis began attending UT and gave birth to her first child in 1988. She graduated after 16 years, citing that working with children in the classroom made her realize that she wanted to make a difference for children and families. She worked in the private practice before serving as a prosecutor for the Travis County District Attorney's Office and an administrative law judge at the State Office of Administrative Hearings.

Before earning her JD, Ellis was a public school teacher, child welfare advocate, and foster parent. While attending Baylor Law School, she drove from Austin to Waco every day as a single mother. Ellis is certified in juvenile law by the Texas Board of Legal Specialization and is a certified specialist in child welfare law by the National Association of Counsel for Children. She is also chair of the State Bar Juvenile Law Section Board.

Ellis is a self-described seventh-generation Texan. She is married.

== Judicial career ==
=== Third Court of Appeals ===
Ellis was elected to Place 2 of the Third Court of Appeals in November 2024 unseating incumbent Edward Smith by about 250 votes in Travis County. She assumed office in 2025. The court hears civil and criminal appeals from 24 Central Texas Counties. Before joining the court, she handled cases involving cases involving divorce, child custody, contract disputes, federal education law, violent felonies, and termination of parental rights

With Ellis' 2024 election, the Third Court of Appeals became composed entirely of women for the first time.

=== 2026 Texas Supreme Court election ===
Ellis challenged and won against incumbent Republican Chief Justice Jimmy Blacklock in the November 3, 2026, general election. She received approximately 52.4% of the vote to Blacklock's 47.6%. Democrats won all four Supreme Court seats on the ballot, with Republicans keeping a 5–4 majority. Ellis is scheduled to assume office in January 2027.

Ellis stated that her motivation for running for Chief Justice of the Texas Supreme Court was the October 2025 amendment to the Code of Judicial Conduct letting judges decline to perform weddings on religious grounds.

== See also ==
- List of LGBTQ judges in the United States

Legal offices
Preceded by Jimmy Blacklock	Chief Justice of the Texas Supreme Court; Taking office 2027	Elect
