= Mary Carroll High School =

Location
- 3202 Saratoga Boulevard; Corpus Christi, Texas
- Coordinates: 27.7182°N 97.4021°W

Information
- Type: Public high school
- Established: 1957
- School district: Corpus Christi Independent School District
- Principal: Robert Arredondo
- Staff: 82.44 (FTE)
- Grades: 9-12
- Enrollment: 1,415 (2019–20)
- Student to teacher ratio: 17.16
- Campus: Urban
- Colors: Navy, Columbia blue, and white
- Athletics conference: District 28-5A (UIL)
- Mascot: Tiger
- Website: carroll.ccisd.us

Mary Carroll High School, often referred to as Carroll, is one of six high schools that are part of the Corpus Christi Independent School District.

== History ==
Opened in 1957, Mary Carroll High School is currently the second largest and third oldest school in the Corpus Christi Independent School District. The school is named for the Corpus Christi Independent School District's first female superintendent. Carroll has moved to a new site and opened a new campus as of August, 2022.

School Motto
Educandi fortitudo. Eliminare infirmitate.

== Administrative ==
Carroll's operating budget for the 2009–2010 school year was $13,557,830.00. Their attendance rate for 2008-2009 was 94.0%.

== Ethnicity ==
Mary Carroll's ethnicity distribution for the 2009–2010 school year was 64.7% Hispanic, 25.0% White, 6.7% African-American, 3.2% Asian/Pacific Islander, and .4% Native American.

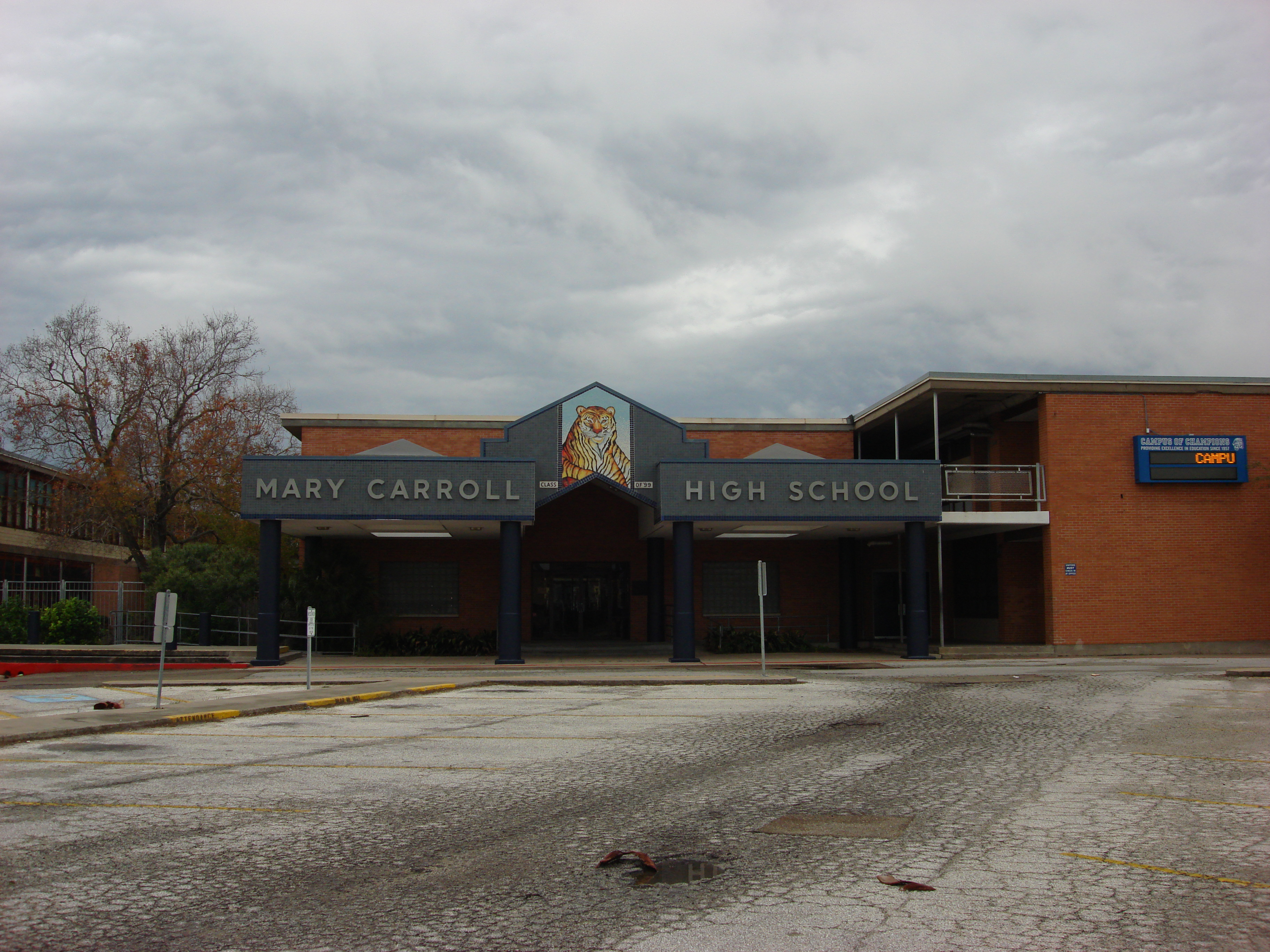
Carroll front parking lot (Main Entrance), mainly used by teachers.

== Notable alumni ==
- Cliff Pennington, Major League infielder for the Los Angeles Angels of Anaheim
- Jeremy Jordan, Broadway actor, nominated for a Tony Award for his role in Newsies
- Gina M. Benavides, Justice, Texas Thirteenth Court of Appeals
- Brooks Kieschnick, an American baseball player
- Terry Labonte, an American NASCAR driver
- Bobby Labonte, an American NASCAR driver
- Chris Richardson, a former member of the Harlem Globetrotters
- Paula DeAnda, an American musician
- Mando Saenz, an American singer and songwriter
- Phil Blackmar, professional golfer on PGA Tour
- Carl Greenwood, professional football player in NFL
