= Dale Wainwright =

American judge

Judge J. Dale Wainwright
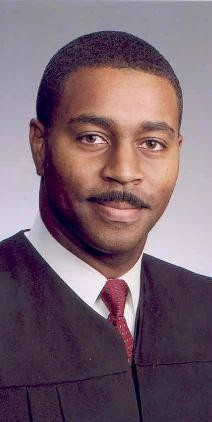

Justice of the Texas Supreme Court, Place 7
- In office January 7, 2003 – September 30, 2012
- Preceded by: Deborah Hankinson
- Succeeded by: Jeffrey S. Boyd

District Judge of the 334th Civil Court of Harris County, Texas
- In office 1999–2003

Personal details
- Born: June 19, 1961 (age 65) Mt. Juliet, Tennessee, U.S.
- Party: Republican
- Spouse: Debra Wainwright
- Children: 4
- Education: Howard University (B.A.); University of Chicago Law School (J.D.)
- Occupation: attorney, former jurist

J. Dale Wainwright (born June 19, 1961 in Mt. Juliet, Tennessee) is a former associate justice of the Texas Supreme Court, now in private practice with Greenberg Traurig, LLP in Austin, Texas.

Wainwright was initially elected to a six-year term, in November 2002, to replace Deborah Hankinson. In 2008, he was re-elected to a second term that would have ended in December 2014.

On September 30, 2012, Wainwright officially resigned from the Texas Supreme Court after nearly a decade of service. He subsequently joined the Austin office of the law firm Bracewell and Giuliani. His successor on the court, effective December 3, 2012, was Jeffrey S. Boyd, a former chief of staff of then Texas Governor Rick Perry. Boyd was appointed by Perry to serve for the remainder of Wainwright's term.

== Early education and career ==
Wainwright graduated summa cum laude with a major in economics from Howard University, studied at the London School of Economics as a Luard Scholar during his junior year, and received his J.D. from the University of Chicago Law School in 1988.

In 1999 Wainwright was appointed by then Texas Governor George W. Bush to the 334th District Court in Harris County, where he served until his election to the supreme court.

== Elections ==
=== 2002 election ===
Wainwright and Wallace B. Jefferson were the first African Americans to be elected to the Texas Supreme Court. Jefferson was initially appointed by Perry in 2001, and won his seat in 2002, in the same election in which Wainwright was elected to an open seat on the court. Like all justices on the state supreme court, Wainwright was a Republican.

=== 2008 election ===
In 2008, Wainwright sought his first reelection to the court. His main opponent was Democratic lawyer Sam Houston. Wainwright was reelected to a new six-year term with 51 percent of the vote to Houston's 45 percent. Libertarian candidate David G. Smith received 3 percent.

== Personal life ==
Wainwright and his wife, Debbie, have three sons, Jeremy, Phillip, and Joshua Wainwright.

== See also ==
- Black conservatism in the United States

Political offices
Preceded by Deborah Hankinson	Texas Supreme Court Justice, Place 7; 2003–2012	Succeeded by Jeffrey S. Boyd
