= Jimmy Blacklock =

American judge (born 1980)

Chief Justice of the Texas Supreme Court
- Incumbent
- Assumed office January 7, 2025
- Appointed by: Greg Abbott
- Preceded by: Nathan Hecht
- Succeeded by: Maggie Ellis (elect)

Justice of the Texas Supreme Court
- In office January 2, 2018 – January 7, 2025
- Appointed by: Greg Abbott
- Preceded by: Don Willett
- Succeeded by: James Sullivan

Personal details
- Born: August 28, 1980 (age 46) Missouri City, Texas, U.S.
- Party: Republican
- Education: University of Texas, Austin (BA); Yale University (JD)
- Website: Official website; Campaign website

Jimmy Blacklock (born August 28, 1980) is an American lawyer serving as the chief justice of the Texas Supreme Court since 2025. A member of the Republican Party, he previously served as a justice of the same court from 2018 to 2025.

== Background ==
Blacklock was born in Houston, Texas. His family moved to Missouri City, Texas, where he attended public school in Fort Bend County, graduating from Elkins High School. He graduated with highest honors from the University of Texas at Austin before attending Yale Law School, where he was a member of the Federalist Society and the President of the Yale Law Republicans. After graduation, He clerked for Judge Jerry Edwin Smith of the United States Court of Appeals for the Fifth Circuit.

== Career ==
After clerking for Judge Smith, Blacklock worked in Vinson & Elkins (V&E) in Houston and Austin. He also served briefly in the United States Department of Justice under President George W. Bush. Blacklock left V&E to work for Texas Attorney General Greg Abbott. Under Abbott’s leadership, Blacklock defended the State of Texas’s Voter ID laws, its abortion laws, its heterosexual marriage laws, and its 2011 redistricting maps. Blacklock advocated in court for religious liberty and gun rights. He also served as Deputy Attorney General, a role that included management of the Opinions, Open Records, and Public Finance divisions of the Attorney General’s Office.

In 2015, Blacklock followed Abbott to the Governor’s office, where he served as Abbott’s general counsel. He continued to represent the State in court while also coordinating the Governor’s oversight of executions and advising the Governor on legislation and other matters. Governor Abbott announced Blacklock’s appointment to the Texas Supreme Court in November 2017, and Blacklock was sworn in on January 2, 2018

== Electoral history ==
Blacklock was up for election for the first time on November 6, 2018. He did not have an opponent in the Republican primary. In the general election, he defeated Democratic challenger Steven Kirkland, a district court judge in Harris County (Houston), with 53.16% of the statewide votes. The statewide turnout in this race was 51.74%.

Blacklock ran successfully for re-election in 2024. Once again, he was not challenged in the primary. In the general election, he defeated DeSean Jones, a district court judge in Harris County, with 58.3% of the statewide votes. Blacklock’s 16.6% margin was the highest margin for a Texas Supreme Court candidate since 2014.

Blacklock ran for re-election as chief justice of the Texas Supreme Court in 2026 seeking a second term. He was defeated by Democratic challenger Maggie Ellis, a justice on the Texas Third Court of Appeals, ending his tenure as chief justice. Blacklock had served in this position since his appointment by Governor Abbott in January 2025.

== Judicial career ==
In May 2020, Blacklock wrote a concurring opinion calling into question the constitutionality of the government’s response to COVID-19, writing, "If we tolerate unconstitutional government orders during an emergency, whether out of expediency or fear, we abandon the Constitution at the moment we need it most." Blacklock was the first Justice to publicly dissent from the Texas Supreme Court's emergency orders closing courthouses throughout Texas because of COVID-19. In February 2021, Blacklock delivered a speech at the University of Chicago Law School, entitled "The Constitution After Covid," in which he again expressed skepticism regarding the constitutionality of various COVID-era government measures.

In August 2021, Blacklock, writing for the Texas Supreme Court, ruled that the Texas Constitution "authorizes each legislative chamber to compel the attendance of absent members, by physical compulsion if necessary." The ruling was in response to Texas House Democrats fleeing the state to deny the chamber the quorum needed to vote on a controversial election bill.

In February 2022, Governor Abbott ordered the Texas Department of Family and Protective Services (DFPS) to investigate child abuse claims filed against parents who might be providing their transgender children with gender-transition procedures. After the ensuing legal battle, Blacklock wrote for a unanimous Court to strike down a state-wide injunction issued by a lower court judge blocking investigation into parents of transgender youths, but he also ruled that the governor did not have the authority to order such investigations. However, Blacklock and two other justices dissented from the Court's decision to block investigation into Doe's family, who had initiated the lawsuit against Abbott.

In February 2023, Blacklock wrote the Court's opinion holding that local government officials in Texas lacked the authority to implement COVID-related emergency orders that were more restrictive than Governor Abbott's more lenient COVID policies.

In June 2024, Blacklock wrote an opinion concurring in the Court’s decision to uphold Texas's ban on transgender medical treatments for minors. Blacklock's opinion criticized Bostock v. Clayton County, the case in which the U.S. Supreme Court extended employment discrimination protections to transgender people. According to Blacklock, the Texas litigation "asks whether the sovereign People of Texas have the power, through their representatives in the Legislature, to answer moral and political questions about childhood transgender therapy in accordance with the Traditional Vision of what it means to be human, male and female. The answer is yes." He continued, "Only by commandeering the Constitution in service of the Transgender Vision, a moral vision that has never once—from 1836 to 2024—obtained the consent of the People of Texas, could any court give the plaintiffs what they seek." Blacklock's contrast between the "Traditional Vision" of human nature and the "Transgender Vision" has been widely commented upon and has been employed by advocates defending bans on transgender treatments for minors.

== Personal life ==
Blacklock lives in Austin with his wife and their three daughters, where they are members of Tarrytown Christian Church.

Legal offices
Preceded by Don Willett	Justice of the Texas Supreme Court; 2018–2025	Succeeded by James Sullivan
Preceded by Nathan Hecht	Chief Justice of the Texas Supreme Court; 2025–present	Succeeded by Maggie Ellis; Elect
