= Bert Richardson (judge) =

American judge

Judge of the Texas Court of Criminal Appeals
- Incumbent
- Assumed office January 1, 2015
- Preceded by: Tom Price
- Succeeded by: Okey Anyiam (elect)

Personal details
- Born: Robert Carl Richardson; 1956 (age 69–70) San Antonio, Texas, U.S.
- Party: Republican
- Children: 1
- Education: Brigham Young University (BA); St. Mary's University, Texas (JD)
- Website: Official website; Campaign website

Robert Carl "Bert" Richardson (born 1956) is an American lawyer who has been a judge of the Texas Court of Criminal Appeals since 2015.

== Early life ==
Born in San Antonio, Richardson's father was a United States Air Force fighter pilot, and the family moved frequently, living for periods in Argentina and in Europe. Richardson graduated from Judson High School in Converse, Texas, and received a B.A. from Brigham Young University, followed by a J.D. degree from St. Mary's University School of Law in San Antonio.

== Legal work ==
Richardson became an Assistant District Attorney in the Bexar County district attorney's office in 1988, and in 1998 became an Assistant U.S. Attorney for the Western District of Texas in San Antonio.

== Judicial work ==
In 1999, Governor George W. Bush appointed Richardson to a seat on the 379th District Court. He remained on that office until 2008, when he lost a bid for reelection to a Democrat, Ron Rangel.

In 2014, Richardson presided as a special judge on call over the 2014 indictment of Governor Rick Perry for alleged abuse of office. During the course of the proceedings, Richardson was elected to the Court of Criminal Appeals, and thereafter denied the motion to dismiss the case against the governor. Richardson won reelection in 2020. In 2025, Richardson decided not to run for reelection to the Texas Court of Criminal Appeals, but instead decided to run for Chief Justice of the Texas 4th Court of Appeals in San Antonio.

Legal offices
Preceded by Tom Price	Judge of the Texas Court of Criminal Appeals; 2015–present	Succeeded by Okey Anyiam; Elect
