= Mark Yeary =

Engineer, IEEE Fellow

Mark Yeary is an engineer at the University of Oklahoma in Norman. He was named a Fellow of the Institute of Electrical and Electronics Engineers (IEEE) in 2016 for his contributions to radar systems in meteorology.
