= Phil Johnson (judge) =

American judge

Justice of the Supreme Court of Texas
- In office March 15, 2005 – December 31, 2018
- Appointed by: Rick Perry
- Preceded by: Michael H. Schneider
- Succeeded by: J. Brett Busby

Chief Justice of the 7th Court of Appeals of Texas
- In office 2002 – March 15, 2005

Associate Justice of the 7th Court of Appeals of Texas
- In office 1999–2002

Personal details
- Born: Philip Wayne Johnson; October 24, 1944 (age 81)
- Party: Republican
- Spouse: Carla Jean Johnson
- Children: 5
- Education: Texas Tech University School of Law
- Occupation: Attorney; Judge
- Awards: Silver Star; Distinguished Flying Cross; Vietnamese Cross of Gallantry; Air Medal

Military service
- Allegiance: United States of America
- Branch/service: United States Air Force
- Years of service: 1965-1972
- Battles/wars: Vietnam War

Philip Wayne Johnson (born October 24, 1944), is a former justice of the Supreme Court of Texas, serving from 2005 to 2018.

Legal offices
Preceded by Michael H. Schneider	Texas Supreme Court Justice, Place 8; 2005–2018	Succeeded by J. Brett Busby
