= Jane Bland =

American judge (born 1965)

Justice of the Supreme Court of Texas
- Incumbent
- Assumed office September 4, 2019
- Appointed by: Greg Abbott
- Preceded by: Jeff Brown

Personal details
- Born: June 1, 1965 (age 61)
- Education: University of Texas at Austin (BBA, JD)
- Website: Office website Campaign website

Jane Nenninger Bland (born June 1, 1965) is an American lawyer and judge from Texas. She is a justice of the Supreme Court of Texas.

== Early life ==
Bland was born June 1, 1965. She received her Bachelor of Business Administration and Juris Doctor from the University of Texas at Austin. While in law school she was vice-chancellor, an editor of the Texas Law Review and a member of the Order of the Coif.

== Career ==
From 1990 to 1991, she clerked for Judge Thomas Gibbs Gee of the United States Court of Appeals for the Fifth Circuit. She then went on to practice law with Baker Botts from 1991 to 1997, focusing on civil trial and appellate work.

=== State judicial service ===
Bland served as the judge of the 281st Judicial District Court in the civil trial division of Harris County, Texas, having initially been appointed by then–Governor George W. Bush in 1997. In 2003, she was appointed to the First Court of Appeals by then-Governor Rick Perry. Bland sat as an appellate justice for 15 years, winning elections in 2004 (to complete the unexpired term), 2006, and 2012. Along with many other Republican incumbents on the court (located in heavily Democratic Harris County), she lost her re-election bid in 2018, and returned to private practice.

=== Texas Supreme Court ===
On August 26, 2019, Governor Greg Abbott announced his intention to appoint Bland to the Supreme Court of Texas to replace Justice Jeff Brown, who had been confirmed by the United States Senate as a District Judge for the U.S. District Court for the Southern District of Texas. She assumed office on September 4, 2019, when Brown was commissioned as a federal district judge. She was sworn in on September 11, 2019.

In 2020 Bland stood for re-election to a full six-year term, defeating Democrat Kathy Cheng in a record-setting performance: the 6,015,699 votes cast for Bland were the most cast for any candidate in Texas history.

== Awards ==
The Texas Association of Civil Trial and Appellate Specialists (TACTAS) recognized Bland as Trial Judge of the Year in 2003 and Appellate Justice of the Year in 2007 and 2015.

In November 2010, U.S. Supreme Court Chief Justice John Roberts presented Bland with the William H. Rehnquist Award, which is given annually by the National Center for State Courts to a state court judge who exemplifies the highest level of judicial excellence, integrity, fairness, and professional ethics.

Legal offices
Preceded by Jeff Brown	Justice of the Supreme Court of Texas; 2019–present	Incumbent
