= Kyle D. Hawkins =

American lawyer

Kyle Hawkins

Justice of the Texas Supreme Court
- Incumbent
- Assumed office October 24, 2025
- Preceded by: Jeffrey S. Boyd
- Succeeded by: Kristen Hawkins (elect)

7th Solicitor General of Texas
- In office September 10, 2018 – February 1, 2021
- Governor: Greg Abbott
- Preceded by: Scott A. Keller
- Succeeded by: Judd E. Stone II

Personal details
- Born: Kyle Douglas Hawkins; May 6, 1980 (age 46) Johannesburg, South Africa
- Party: Republican
- Education: Harvard University (BA); University of Minnesota (JD)
- Website: Official website; Campaign website

Kyle Douglas Hawkins (born May 6, 1980) is a South African-born American attorney and professor serving as a justice of the Texas Supreme Court since 2025. A member of the Republican Party, he served as the Solicitor General of Texas from 2018 to 2021. As of 2024, Hawkins serves as adjunct professor at the University of Texas at Austin's law school.

== Early life and education ==
Hawkins was born in Johannesburg, South Africa and immigrated to the United States with his family in 1986. He graduated from Edina High School in Edina, Minnesota in 1998, and then attended Harvard University, where he received a bachelor's degree magna cum laude in 2002. He then worked as a management consultant in Chicago for two years, before moving to Japan for another two years to teach English. In 2006, Hawkins returned to Minnesota to attend the University of Minnesota Law School where he served as the editor-in-chief of the Minnesota Law Review and graduated summa cum laude in 2009 with a Juris Doctor degree.

== Legal career ==
After law school, Hawkins worked briefly at Faegre Baker Daniels before serving as a law clerk for Judge Edith Jones on the United States Court of Appeals for the Fifth Circuit in 2010. Following this clerkship, he worked for Gibson, Dunn & Crutcher in Washington, D.C. before serving as a law clerk for Justice Samuel Alito of the United States Supreme Court during the 2013–14 term. He then rejoined Gibson, Dunn & Crutcher, where he practiced law through their Dallas, Texas office before joining the Texas Attorney General's office in 2017, as an assistant solicitor general. In September 2018, he was appointed Solicitor General of Texas by Texas Attorney General Ken Paxton to succeed Scott A. Keller.

In his role as the state's solicitor general, Hawkins represented Texas in cases before state and federal appellate courts, including the U.S. Supreme Court. In 2018, Hawkins argued on behalf of 36 states seeking to uphold the separate sovereignty exception in Gamble v. United States. A 2020 speech he gave at Stanford University Law School regarding the legality of the federal Deferred Action for Childhood Arrivals policy was the subject of a student walk-out. Hawkins notably refused to join Ken Paxton's attempt to overturn the 2020 U.S. presidential election in Texas v. Pennsylvania.

Following this, Hawkins resigned from office effective February 1, 2021, and was succeeded by Judd E. Stone II. He then rejoined Gibson, Dunn & Crutcher as a partner in its Houston, Texas office.

== Texas Supreme Court ==
On October 24, 2025, Governor Greg Abbott appointed Hawkins to the Texas Supreme Court to replace Jeffrey S. Boyd. He would later lose re-election in 2026 to Kristen Hawkins, whom he had no relation to.

== See also ==
- List of law clerks for the eighth seat of the Supreme Court of the United States
- List of Justices of the Texas Supreme Court

Legal offices
Preceded by Jeffrey S. Boyd	Justice of the Texas Supreme Court; 2025–present	Succeeded by Kristen Hawkins; Elect
