= Chari Kelly =

Justice of the Texas Supreme Court (2027-)

Justice of the Texas Supreme Court
- Elect
- Assuming office December 2026
- Succeeding: James Sullivan

Personal details
- Born: 1976 or 1977 (age 49–50)
- Party: Democratic
- Education: University of Florida (BA); University of Texas, Austin (JD)

Chari Kelly (born 1976/1977) is an American attorney, veteran, and judge who is currently a Justice-elect of the Texas Supreme Court. She previously served as a judge on Texas's Third Court of Appeals before unseating incumbent justice James P. Sullivan in the 2026 Texas elections.

== Biography ==
Kelly attended Spruce Creek High School before attending the University of Florida, from where she earned a BA in political science and criminology in 1999. She went on to earn her JD from the University of Texas at Austin, graduating in 2002. She also worked as a paratrooper.

She subsequently served for four years in the Judge Advocate General's Corps at Fort Hood, where she rose to the rank of Captain. She has since worked as a law clerk at the Texas Court of Criminal Appeals and a research attorney at the same location and a prosecutor in Cornal County and Travis County. In 2018, she was named best prosecutor in Travis County by Mothers Against Drunk Driving. She was also an assistant attorney general, where one of her focuses was on stopping companies from committing Medicaid fraud.

She ran for the Texas Third Court of Appeals in 2018, and expressed confidence that she would win and that there would be a blue wave, stating "If not now, when?" She ultimately did win that year, unseating incumbent Judge Scott Field, and she assumed office in 2019. She also worked as a lecturer at the University of Texas School of Law.

While an appellate justice, she ran for Texas Supreme Court Place 2 in 2026, and received the endorsement of the Houston Chronicle. During the blue wave of that year's elections in Texas, she unseated incumbent justice James P. Sullivan. She will assume office in 2026 or 2027.

Legal offices
Preceded by James Sullivan	Justice of the Texas Supreme Court; Taking office 2026	Elect
