= Gisela Triana =

American judge

Justice of the Texas Supreme Court
- Elect
- Assuming office January 2027
- Succeeding: J. Brett Busby

Personal details
- Born: 1965 or 1966 (age 60–61)
- Party: Democratic
- Education: University of Texas, San Antonio (BA); University of Texas, Austin (JD)

Gisela Triana (born 1965/1966) is an American judge. She was a municipal, county, and district judge in Travis County before becoming a justice on the Third Court of Appeals of Texas in 2018. She is a Democratic justice-elect of the Texas Supreme Court, defeating J. Brett Busby in the 2026 Texas Supreme Court election after losing to him in 2020.

== Biography ==
=== Early life and career ===
Triana was born in 1966 or 1967. She was raised in San Antonio, where she attended Ursuline Academy before graduating from Tom C. Clark High School. She obtained her BA magna cum laude from University of Texas at San Antonio in 1985 and her JD from University of Texas at Austin School of Law in 1988.

=== Legal career ===
Triana originally joined the Travis County Attorney's Office as a prosecutor before becoming trial division director there, and also joined the Secretary of State of Texas's election division as a staff attorney. She also serves in private practice as operator of a law firm named Hanko & Triana. She has also taught foreign jurists in UT Austin's International Office.

Triana served on the City of Austin Municipal Court (1994-1998) and Travis County Court at Law (2000-2004), as well as a Travis County justice of the peace (1999). In 2005, she became a justice on the 200th Judicial District Court in Travis County, serving until 2018. In 2018, she ran for justice in the Third Court of Appeals of Texas; after winning the Democratic primary unopposed, she won the general election, defeating Michael Toth 54.4% to 45.4%. Legal 500 remarked that "few Texas judges have seen the courtroom from as many perspectives" as Triana.

In July 2012, Triana wrote a ruling classifying clean air as a public trust, counter to the Texas Commission on Environmental Quality's findings limiting that to water alone. In December 2020, Triana wrote the opinion blocking the state government's attempted takeover of Houston Independent School District. In April 2021, when the court dismissed Attorney General Ken Paxton's case lawsuit challenge New Years' curfews issued by Travis County and Austin, Traina cited the past nature of the events in contrast to the lawsuit relying on future and uncertain ones as the reason for voiding the appeal.

=== Texas Supreme Court ===
Triana ran in the 2020 Texas Supreme Court election against Republican incumbent J. Brett Busby. She criticized the Republican governors' involvement in appointing Supreme Court justices for "ma[king] the Court result-oriented and beholden to special interests and political contributors", and cited equality, access to justice, and fairness as priorities. After defeating Peter M. Kelly in the Democratic primary 72% to 28%, she lost to Busby 44.1% to 53.4%.

Triana was a Democratic candidate in the 2026 Texas Supreme Court election, again running against Busby. She was endorsed by the Texas AFL-CIO and several Democratic groups. Her campaign had $128,786 on hand by June 2026, with $9,425 raised in the first half of 2026, and she received three donations of $2,000 or $2,500 from state-based law firms. Triana won the election, defeating Busby 52% to 48%.

=== Personal life ===
On March 21, 2015, Triana was arrested on suspicion of drunk driving after police pulled her over for speeding; in June 2015, Travis County Attorney David Escamilla declined to prosecute due to a lack of evidence, with her blood alcohol level 0.04 below the state's legal limit. Five yars later, Triana reflected on that experience: "We all have our implicit, if not explicit, biases. It is easy to assume that someone who has been arrested is guilty. However, we have seen, time and time again, exceptions to that assumption. I am a more open-minded and fair judge because of the experience."

Triana has five children.

Legal offices
Preceded by J. Brett Busby	Justice of the Texas Supreme Court; Taking office 2027	Elect
