= Texas Board of Legal Specialization =

Regulatory body for attorneys in Texas, United States

The Texas Board of Legal Specialization (TBLS) was established on July 16, 1974, by the State Bar of Texas. TBLS oversees the recognition and regulation of attorneys who specialize in particular areas of law in the state of Texas. Today, the organization certifies attorneys in 24 different specialty areas and paralegals in six specialty areas.

== Purpose ==
The TBLS' purpose is to advance the standards of the legal profession and support the availability, accessibility and quality of services provided by Texas attorneys to the public in selected areas of law.

== Governance ==
The TBLS is overseen by twelve members who are appointed by the President of the State Bar of Texas and approved by its Board of Directors. It has authority over all matters relating legal specialization in Texas and is subject to ongoing jurisdiction by the Supreme Court of Texas.

== Specialty areas ==
The Texas Board of Legal Specialization certifies attorneys in the following selected areas of Texas law:

- Administrative
- Bankruptcy – Business and consumer
- Civil appellate
- Civil trial
- Consumer and commercial
- Criminal
- Estate planning and probate
- Family
- Health
- Immigration and nationality
- Juvenile
- Labor and employment
- Oil, gas, and mineral
- Personal injury trial
- Real estate – commercial, farm & ranch, property owners association, residential
- Tax
- Workers' compensation
- Criminal appellate
- Child welfare
- Construction

== See also ==
- State Bar of Texas
- American Bar Association
- Texas Supreme Court
- Professional certification
- National Board of Legal Specialty Certification
- Attorneys in the United States
