= Jeff Brown (judge) =

American judge (born 1970)

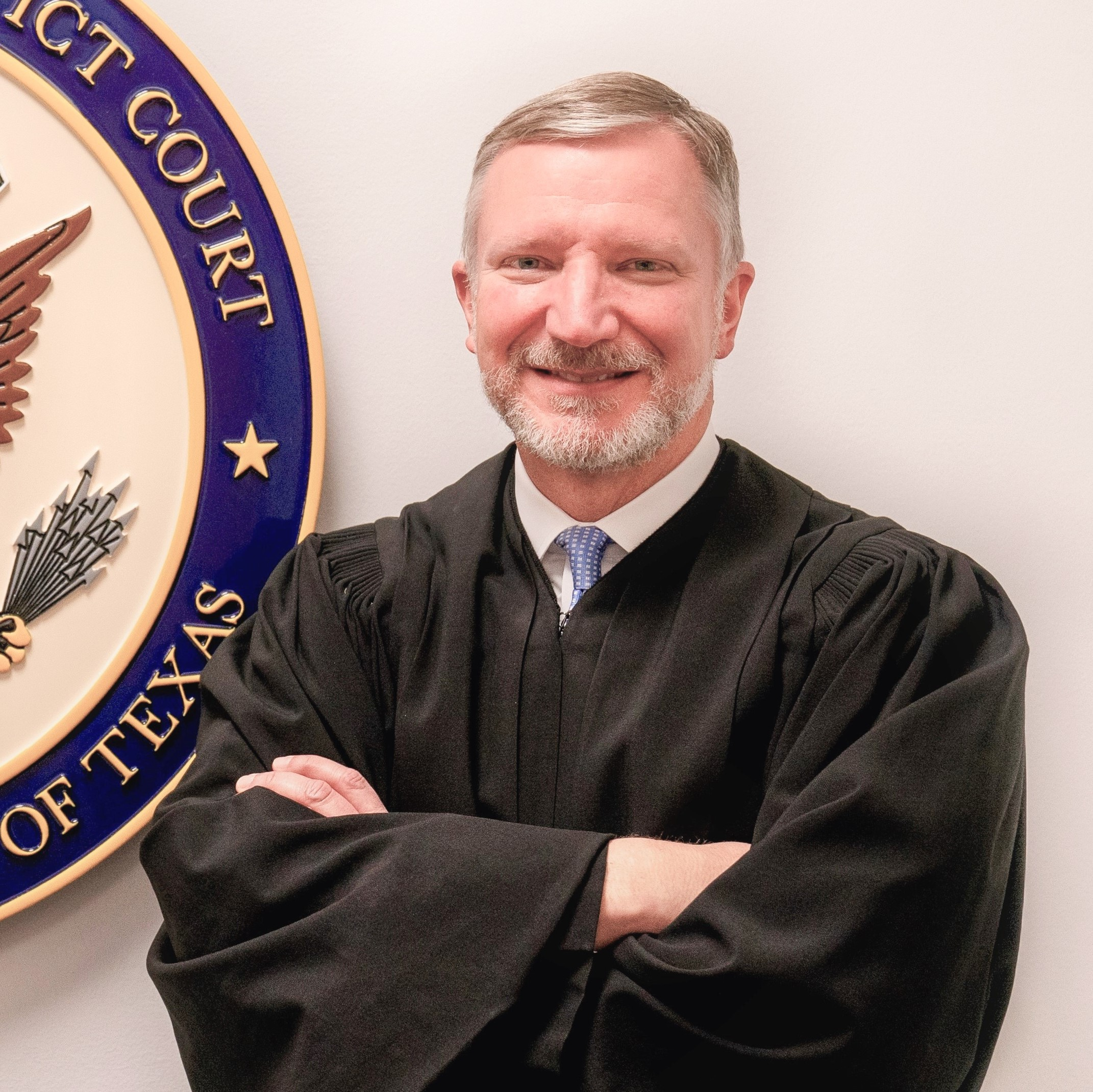

Judge of the United States District Court for the Southern District of Texas
- Incumbent
- Assumed office September 4, 2019
- Appointed by: Donald Trump
- Preceded by: Melinda Harmon

Justice of the Supreme Court of Texas
- In office October 3, 2013 – September 4, 2019
- Appointed by: Rick Perry
- Preceded by: Nathan Hecht
- Succeeded by: Jane Bland

Associate Justice of the 14th Court of Appeals of Texas
- In office 2007 – October 3, 2013

Judge of the 55th District Court of Texas
- In office 2001–2007

Personal details
- Born: March 27, 1970 (age 56) Dallas, Texas, U.S.
- Party: Republican
- Spouse: Susannah Brown
- Children: 3
- Education: University of Texas (BA); University of Houston (JD)

Jeffrey Vincent Brown (born March 27, 1970) is a United States district judge for the United States District Court for the Southern District of Texas and a former justice of the Texas Supreme Court. He was appointed to the U.S. District Court by President Donald Trump.

== Early life and education ==
Brown's father was a police officer. In 1988, Brown graduated from Bishop Lynch High School in Dallas, Texas. He earned his bachelor's degree in English from the University of Texas and his Juris Doctorate, magna cum laude, from the University of Houston Law Center at which he served as one of the editors of the Houston Law Review. He served as a law clerk to Texas Supreme Court Justices Jack Hightower and Greg Abbott, the subsequent governor of Texas. He became certified in civil trial law and practiced with the Houston firm of Baker Botts L.L.P.

== Judicial career ==
From 2001 to 2007, Judge Brown served as a judge of the 55th Texas State District Court in Harris County, Texas. Judge Jeff Brown was appointed to the trial court by Governor Rick Perry in December 2001, won an opposed election to that bench in November 2002, and won re-election in 2006.

From 2007 to 2013, he served as a justice on Texas Fourteenth District Court of Appeals. Governor Perry appointed Brown to the Court in 2007, and he won election to the seat in 2008 and 2012. In 2013, Brown became interim Chief Justice of the court. In 2011, Judge Brown was named Appellate Judge of the Year by the Texas Association of Civil Trial & Appellate Specialists.

On September 26, 2013, Governor Perry appointed Brown to the Texas Supreme Court to fill the seat of Nathan Hecht, who was elevated to chief justice. Brown was elected to the Court on November 4, 2014, and re-elected on November 6, 2018.

In the 2014 Republican primary election, Brown defeated an intraparty challenge from Joe Richard Pool Jr., son of the late U.S. Representative Joe R. Pool, who in the 1960s held Texas' 3rd congressional district seat. Brown received 820,582 votes (71.9 percent) to Pool's 320,558 (28.1 percent). In the November 4, 2014, general election, Brown defeated the Republican-turned-Democrat Lawrence E. Meyers. Brown polled 2,772,056 votes (60.3 percent) to Meyers's 1,677,341 (36.5 percent). Another 146,511 votes (3.2 percent) went to the Libertarian Party nominee, Mark Ash.

Brown again won election to a full term on the Texas Supreme Court in 2018. With 4,388,052 votes (53.7 percent), he defeated Democrat Kathy Cheng, who polled 3,777,468 (46.3 percent).

His service on the Texas Supreme Court ended on September 4, 2019, when he was commissioned as a federal district judge.

=== Federal judicial service ===
On March 8, 2019, President Donald Trump announced his intent to nominate Brown to serve as a United States district judge of the United States District Court for the Southern District of Texas. On March 11, 2019, President Trump nominated Brown to the seat vacated by Judge Melinda Harmon, who assumed senior status on March 31, 2018. On April 10, 2019, a hearing on his nomination was held before the Senate Judiciary Committee. The American Bar Association unanimously rated Brown well qualified for the position. On May 9, 2019, his nomination was reported out of committee by a 12–10 vote. On July 30, 2019, the United States Senate invoked cloture on his nomination by a 51–37 vote. On July 31, 2019, his nomination was confirmed by a 50–40 vote. He received his judicial commission on September 4, 2019. He was sworn into office on September 11, 2019.

==== Notable rulings ====
In January 2022, Brown enjoined enforcement of a COVID-19 vaccine mandate for federal employees that President Biden's administration had implemented. Noting his belief that people should get vaccinated against COVID-19, Brown explained that the case turned on the question of "whether the President can, with the stroke of a pen and without the input of Congress, require millions of federal employees to undergo a medical procedure as a condition of their employment." In April 2022, two judges on a three-judge panel of the United States Court of Appeals for the Fifth Circuit vacated Brown's ruling, but in June a majority of active Fifth Circuit judges voted to rehear the cause en banc, thereby vacating the April panel opinion. In March 2023, the Fifth Circuit, sitting en banc, affirmed Brown's nationwide injunction; Judge Andrew Oldham wrote the opinion for a ten-member majority.

In October 2023, in what was the first Voting Rights Act case decided since Allen v Milligan, Brown ruled that a newly adopted map for local elections in Galveston County, Texas, violated § 2 of the VRA by eliminating the county's one majority-minority precinct and thereby making less likely the election of a candidate preferred by a majority of Black and Latino voters. In November 2023, a unanimous Fifth Circuit panel affirmed Brown's judgment, holding that he had faithfully applied binding circuit precedent. But "the members of th[e] panel agree[d] that th[e] court’s precedent permitting aggregation" of "distinct minority groups like blacks and Hispanics . . . for purposes of vote-dilution claims under Section 2" "should be overturned." The panel "therefore call[ed] for th[e] case to be reheard en banc." Later that month, a majority of active Fifth Circuit judges voted to rehear the case en banc.

In November 2025, Brown ruled, along with Judge David C. Guaderrama that the 2025 Texas redistricting maps were likely racial gerrymandering and were thus unconstitutional. Circuit judge Jerry Smith's dissenting opinion excoriated Brown in unusually personal terms, accusing him of "pernicious judicial misbehavior" for allegedly rushing out the injunction without allowing time for a dissent.

== Personal life ==
Brown and his wife, Susannah, a former schoolteacher, have three children. They reside in Galveston.

In 2016, he was awarded the Outstanding Eagle Scout Award by the National Eagle Scout Association.

== See also ==
- List of justices of the Texas Supreme Court

Political offices
Preceded by Nathan Hecht	Texas Supreme Court Justice, Place 6; 2013–2019	Succeeded by Jane Bland
Preceded by Melinda Harmon	Judge of the United States District Court for the Southern District of Texas; 2019–present	Incumbent
