= Kevin Yeary =

American attorney

Judge of the Texas Court of Criminal Appeals
- Incumbent
- Assumed office January 1, 2015
- Preceded by: Paul Womack
- Succeeded by: Audra Riley (elect)

Personal details
- Born: Kevin Patrick Yeary; September 8, 1966 (age 60)
- Party: Republican
- Education: St. Mary's University, Texas (BA, JD)
- Website: Official website; Campaign website

Kevin Patrick Yeary is an American attorney and jurist serving as a judge of the Texas Court of Criminal Appeals since 2015.

== Background ==
Yeary has a Bachelors of Arts in English communication from St. Mary's University. He also has his Juris Doctor from St. Mary's University.

Following law school, Yeary was a briefing attorney for Judge Bill White, a former judge of the Texas Court of Criminal Appeals. From 1992 to 1995, Yeary worked as an associate attorney for Hedges & Walsh. However, he left private practice to become an assistant district attorney, where he worked in Dallas County, Harris County, and Bexar County.

== Judgeship ==
In 2014, Yeary was elected to Place 4 on the Texas Court of Criminal Appeals as a Republican in a partisan election. According to an analysis done by Ballotpedia to determine judge partisan behavior, Yeary was labeled a "mild Republican". Texas Attorney General Ken Paxton has criticized every member of the Texas Court of Criminal Appeals except Yeary because he was the lone dissenter in a case that prohibited the state attorney general from having unilateral power to prosecute voter fraud.

Legal offices
Preceded by Paul Womack	Judge of the Texas Court of Criminal Appeals; 2015–present	Succeeded by Audra Riley; Elect
