= Jeffrey S. Boyd =

American judge (born 1961)

Jeff Boyd
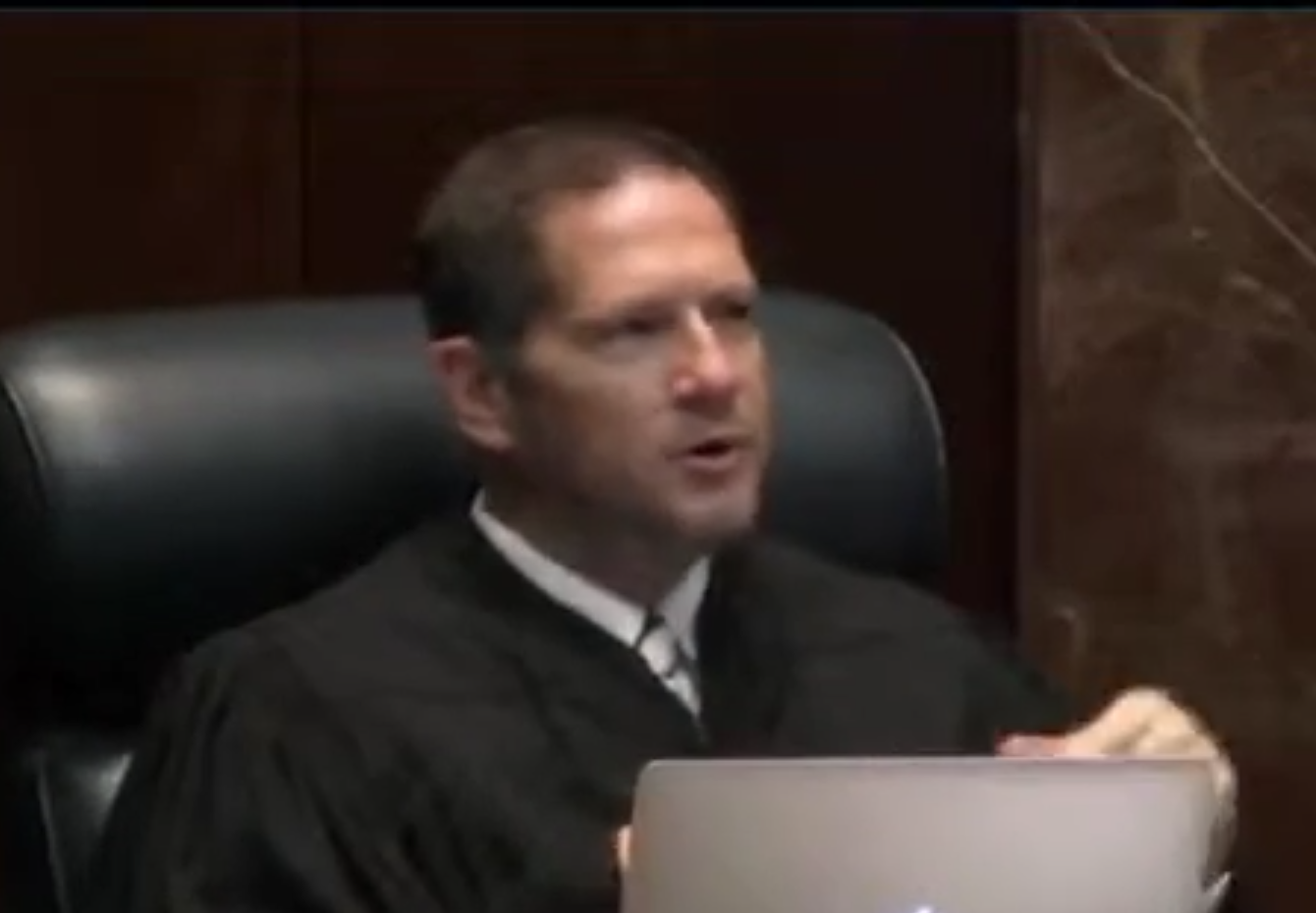

Justice of the Texas Supreme Court
- In office December 3, 2012 – September 1, 2025
- Appointed by: Rick Perry
- Preceded by: Dale Wainwright
- Succeeded by: Kyle D. Hawkins

Personal details
- Born: Jeffrey Scott Boyd; 1961 (age 64–65) Biloxi, Mississippi, U.S.
- Party: Republican
- Spouse: Jackie Tubbs
- Children: 3
- Education: Abilene Christian University (BA); Pepperdine University (JD)
- Website: justicejeffboyd.com

Jeffrey Scott Boyd (born 1961) is an American lawyer who served as a justice of the Texas Supreme Court from 2012 to 2025. He was appointed to Place 7 on the court by Governor Rick Perry in the fall of 2012 to fill the seat vacated by Justice Dale Wainwright, and he won a full six-year term on the court in the 2014 election.

== Early life ==
The third of four children of a military family, Boyd grew up living on or near numerous United States Air Force bases around the world. He transferred from Germany to Austin, Texas, just before his senior year of high school. He graduated in 1979 from Round Rock High School in Round Rock in Williamson County north of Austin. He received his undergraduate degree in Biblical studies from Abilene Christian University in Abilene, Texas in 1983. He then served as youth and family minister for the Brentwood Oaks Church of Christ in Austin for five years before beginning law school. He served as editor-in-chief of the Pepperdine Law Review and received his Juris Doctor summa cum laude from Pepperdine University School of Law in Malibu, California, second in his class.

== Career ==
From 1991 to 1992, Boyd served as law clerk for Judge Thomas Morrow Reavley on the United States Court of Appeals for the Fifth Circuit. In 1992, Boyd joined the Austin office of Thompson & Knight LLP as a civil trial associate, and became a partner on his first year of eligibility in 1998. In 2000, Boyd left the firm to accept an appointment as deputy Attorney General for Civil Litigation in the office of John Cornyn, the Attorney General of Texas who in 2002 was elected to the U.S. Senate. In this position, Boyd managed more than three hundred litigators in eleven divisions and oversaw all civil litigation involving the State of Texas, its agencies, and its officials. After Cornyn assumed his U.S. Senate seat, Boyd continued until August 2003 in the deputy attorney general position under Cornyn's successor as Attorney General, Greg Abbott, who has served as governor of Texas since 2015. Boyd then returned to Thompson & Knight as a senior partner and served as practice leader for the firm's government litigation group. In January 2011, Boyd left the firm to accept a position as General Counsel for the office of then-Governor Rick Perry. After eight months in that role, Governor Perry appointed him as his chief of staff, a position that Boyd filled until Perry appointed him to the Texas Supreme Court in December 2012.

Although four of the court's justices were on the ballot in 2014, Boyd was the only one—and in fact the only statewide Texas candidate—who was unopposed in the Republican primary election held on March 4, 2014. In the November 4 general election, he defeated the Democratic candidate, Gina M. Benavides, a justice on the Thirteenth Court of Appeals, with 2,711,363 (58.9 percent) of the votes to 1,731,031 (37.6 percent).

Boyd retired from the court in September 2025. In October 2025, Governor Greg Abbott appointed former Texas Solicitor General Kyle D. Hawkins to succeed him.

== Personal life ==
Boyd resides in Austin with his wife, the former Jackie Tubbs, who has served since 2005 as director of children's ministries at the Brentwood Oaks Church of Christ. Their twin daughters, Hanna and Abbie, both graduated from Abilene Christian University, and their son graduated from Savannah College of Art and Design in Savannah, Georgia.

Legal offices
Preceded by Dale Wainwright	Justice of the Texas Supreme Court; 2012–2025	Succeeded by Kyle D. Hawkins
