= Nathan Hecht =

American judge (born 1949)

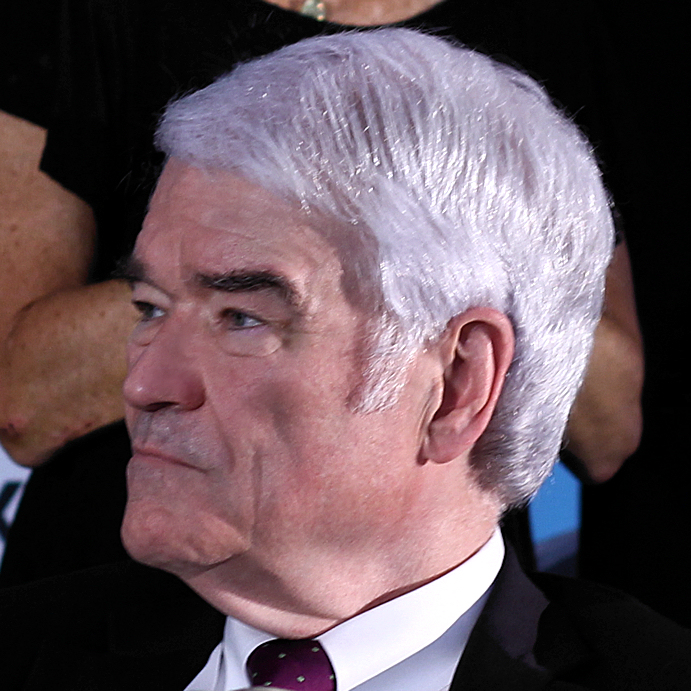

Chief Justice of the Supreme Court of Texas
- In office October 1, 2013 – December 31, 2024
- Appointed by: Rick Perry
- Preceded by: Wallace B. Jefferson
- Succeeded by: Jimmy Blacklock

Justice of the Supreme Court of Texas
- In office January 1, 1989 – October 1, 2013
- Appointed by: Bill Clements
- Preceded by: William Kilgarin
- Succeeded by: Jeff Brown

Personal details
- Born: Nathan Lincoln Hecht; August 15, 1949 (age 77) Clovis, New Mexico, U.S.
- Party: Republican
- Spouse: Priscilla Richman (m. 2022)
- Education: Yale University (BA); Southern Methodist University (JD)

Military service
- Allegiance: United States
- Branch/service: United States Navy
- Rank: Lieutenant
- Unit: United States Navy Reserve

Nathan Lincoln Hecht (born August 15, 1949) is an American lawyer who served as the chief justice of the Supreme Court of Texas from 2013 to 2024. A Republican from Dallas, Hecht was first elected to the Supreme Court in 1988 and is the longest tenured Supreme Court justice in Texas history. He won six re-elections, heard over 2,700 oral arguments, and authored more than 7,000 pages of opinions during his time as a Supreme Court justice.

== Early life and educataion ==
Nathan Hecht was born in Clovis, New Mexico to a farming family, and graduated from Clovis public schools. He earned his Bachelor of Arts from Yale University in New Haven, Connecticut, with honors in Philosophy and graduated thereafter cum laude from the Southern Methodist University Dedman School of Law.

== Career ==
Upon his graduation, Hecht began working a law clerk to Judge Roger Robb of the United States Court of Appeals for the District of Columbia Circuit. He served as a lieutenant in the U.S. Naval Reserve. He practiced law in the area of general litigation with the Dallas firm of Locke Purnell Boren Laney & Neely, and was a shareholder in that firm prior to his appointment to the bench.

While on the district court, Hecht was the local administrative judge, presiding over all county and district judges in Dallas County and representing them before other branches of government.

He began his judicial service on the 95th District Court of Dallas County, to which he was appointed by Governor Bill Clements, on September 1, 1981, elected in 1982, and re-elected in 1984. In 1986, he was elected to the Texas Court of Appeals for the Fifth District of Texas at Dallas, where he served until his election to the Supreme Court of Texas.

=== Harriet Miers nomination ===
In the days after the October 3, 2005, nomination of Harriet Miers to be an associate justice of the United States Supreme Court, Hecht became nationally known as a strong supporter of White House Counsel Miers based upon his long friendship with her. According to Hecht, he and Miers dated in the past and were members of the same church. Hecht gave 120 interviews in support of the eventually-unsuccessful nomination.

The New York Times has reported that, on the day of Miers' nomination, Hecht participated in a conference call with the Arlington Group, a coalition of Christian conservatives, assuring them of her pro-life views.

In May 2006, Hecht was admonished by the Texas State Commission on Judicial Conduct for "an improper use of his office and position to promote Miers's private interest" during the nomination; a three-judge panel exonerated Hecht of the charge after he appealed the decision.

In March 2007, Hecht said that he had asked then Texas State Representative Tony Goolsby to propose a bill that would make the state reimburse his $340,000 legal fees acquired from the case before the Texas State Commission on Judicial Conduct. His lawyers had discounted his fees by $167,500. Goolsby withdrew the bill after learning that Hecht had already been reimbursed for the bill through "donations." Hecht defended his position by saying, "Here is the problem: If judges are sanctioned like this and it's unjust and it's wrong and they want to prove it, they can represent themselves or hire a lawyer that you can't pay for on a judge's salary." He is paid $152,500.

In December 2008, he was fined $29,000 by the Texas Ethics Commission in connection with the discount, which the Commission ruled was an improper political contribution. Hecht filed an appeal of the decision in Travis County District Court, which removed the fine. The appeal was filed in January 2009 and it began the whole process over again. After nearly eight years, in August 2016 the Texas Ethics Commission and Hecht settled the case. Neither side was deemed to have prevailed, but Hecht did agree to pay a $1,000 fine.

=== Election of 2012 ===
In the November 6 general election, Hecht polled 4,116,102 votes (53.7%), compared to 3,208,479 (41.9%) for the Democrat Michele Petty. Two minor candidates held the remaining 4.4% of the ballots. Hecht lost his own county of Dallas, in which he polled 273,105 votes (40.2 percent), compared to Petty's 382,140 (56.2 percent). However, he won neighboring Tarrant County, which includes Fort Worth.

=== Election of 2014 ===
Hecht, backed by U.S. Senator Ted Cruz, easily won re-nomination as chief justice in the Republican primary election held on March 4, 2014. He polled 707,692 (60.5 percent); his challenger, former State Representative Robert Talton of Pasadena in Harris County, received 462,273 votes (39.5 percent).

In the November 4 general election, Justice Hecht defeated William Moody, who ran unopposed in the Democratic party primary. With 426,898 primary votes, Moody ran 281,000 below Hecht's Republican primary total.

Though Hecht himself has benefited from straight ticket voting for his court position, the justice has called for abolition of master levers for political parties on voting machines in Texas. According to Hecht, on November 8, 2016,

Many good judges [such as Laura Parker in Bexar County) lost solely because voters in their districts preferred a presidential candidate (Hillary Rodham Clinton carried Bexar County.) in the other party. These kinds of partisan sweeps are common, with judicial candidates at the mercy of the top of the ticket. Such partisan sweeps are demoralizing to judges and disruptive to the legal system. But worse than that, when partisan politics is the driving force, and the political climate is as harsh as ours has become, judicial elections make judges more political, and judicial independence is the casualty.

Former Chief Justices Wallace Jefferson, Thomas R. Phillips, and John Luke Hill, the last Democrat in the position, have also called for reforms in the selection of judges. Joe Straus, the former Moderate Republican Speaker of the Texas House of Representatives has urged that straight ticket voting be abolished for all elections, not just judicial ones.

Hecht was appointed chief justice by Governor Rick Perry on September 10, 2013, and was sworn into that position by retiring Chief Justice Wallace B. Jefferson on October 1, 2013.

In 2024, the Texas Constitution prevented Hecht's re-election, as his age required he retire by the end of the year.

== Personal life ==
In April 2022, Hecht married Priscilla Richman, who has served as a circuit judge on the United States Court of Appeals for the Fifth Circuit since 2005. Hecht has played the organ for his non-denominational Christian church.

Hecht is a member of the American Law Institute, a member of the Texas Philosophical Society, and a fellow of the Texas and American Bar Foundations. He is on the advisory board of the S.M.U. Law Review and was named Outstanding Young Lawyer in 1984 by the Dallas Association of Young Lawyers.

Legal offices
Preceded by William Kilgarin	Justice of the Texas Supreme Court; 1989–2013	Succeeded by Jeff Brown
Preceded by Wallace B. Jefferson	Chief Justice of the Texas Supreme Court; 2013–2024	Succeeded by Jimmy Blacklock
