= Supreme Court of Texas =

Highest court in the U.S. state of Texas for civil appeals

- Seal of the Supreme Court

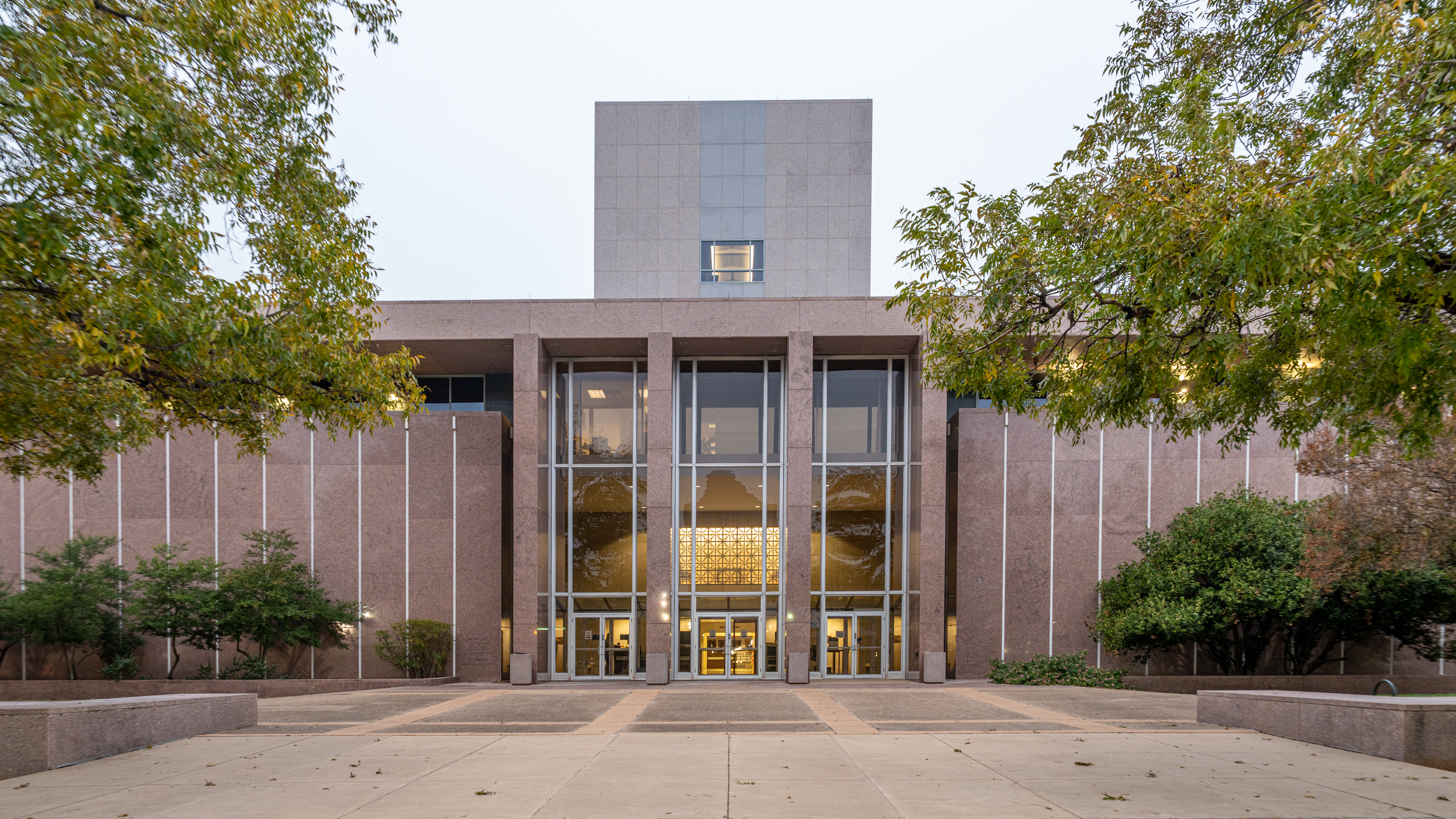
- Texas Supreme Court Building
- Interactive map of Supreme Court of Texas
- 30°16′33″N 97°44′28″W
- Established: February 19, 1846
- Jurisdiction: Texas, United States
- Location: Austin, Texas
- Coordinates: 30°16′33″N 97°44′28″W
- Composition method: Partisan election
- Authorized by: Constitution of Texas
- Appeals to: Supreme Court of the United States
- Judge term length: 6 years; renewable
- Number of positions: 9
- Website: Official website

Chief Justice
- Currently: Jimmy Blacklock
- Since: January 7, 2025

The Supreme Court of Texas (SCOTX) is the court of last resort for civil matters (including juvenile delinquency cases, which are categorized as civil under the Texas Family Code) in the U.S. state of Texas. A different court, the Texas Court of Criminal Appeals, is the court of last resort in criminal matters. They operate separately because it allows each court to focus on certain issues and allows faster resolution of cases. Texas is one of only two states that has different courts of last resort for different cases (the other being Oklahoma).

The Court has its seat at the Supreme Court Building on the State Capitol grounds in Austin, Texas. It was established in 1846 to replace the Supreme Court of the Republic of Texas.

The Texas Supreme Court consists of a chief justice and eight justices. All nine positions are elected, with a term of office of six years and no term limit.

== Regulation of the practice of law in Texas courts ==
By statute, the Texas Supreme Court has administrative control over the State Bar of Texas, an agency of the judiciary. The Texas Supreme Court has the sole authority to license attorneys in Texas. It also appoints the members of the Board of Law Examiners which, under instructions of the Supreme Court, administers the Texas bar exam. The Court has the last word in attorney disciplinary proceedings brought by the Commission for Lawyer Discipline, a committee of the State Bar of Texas, but rarely exercises discretionary review in such cases. The Supreme Court accepts fewer than 100 cases per year to be decided on the merits. In addition to its adjudicatory and administrative functions, the Supreme Court promulgates, and occasionally revises, court rules of procedure, which include the Texas Rules of Civil Procedure (TRCP), the Texas Rules of Evidence (TRE), and the Texas Rules of Appellate Procedure (TRAP).

== Unique procedural aspects ==
The Texas Supreme Court is the only state supreme court in the United States where the manner in which it denies discretionary review can actually imply approval or disapproval of the merits of the lower court's decision and in turn may affect the geographic extent of the precedential effect of that decision. In March 1927, the Texas Legislature enacted a law directing the Texas Supreme Court to summarily refuse to hear applications for writs of error when it believed the Court of Appeals opinion correctly stated the law. Thus, since June 1927, over 4,100 decisions of the Texas Courts of Appeals have become valid binding precedent of the Texas Supreme Court itself because the high court refused applications for writ of error rather than denying them and thereby signaled that it approved of their holdings as the law of the state.

While Texas's unique practice saved the state supreme court from having to hear relatively minor cases just to create uniform statewide precedents on those issues, it also makes for lengthy citations to the opinions of the Courts of Appeals, since the subsequent writ history of the case must always be noted (e.g., no writ, writ refused, writ denied, etc.) in order for the reader to determine at a glance whether the cited opinion is binding precedent only in the district of the Court of Appeals in which it was decided, or binding precedent for the entire state. Citations to cases from the Houston-based Courts of Appeals are also longer than others because they require identification of the appellate district number -- [1st Dist.] or [14th Dist.] -- in addition to the name of the city.

== Structure of the court and membership ==
The Texas Supreme Court consists of a chief justice and eight justices. All positions are elective. While the chief has special administrative responsibilities, each member has one vote and may issue a dissenting or concurring opinion. Granted cases are assigned to justices' chambers for opinion authorship by draw. Grants require four votes. Judgments are rendered by majority vote. Per curiam opinions may be issued if at least six justices agree. Petitions for review are automatically denied after 30 days unless at least one justice pulls them off the metaphorical conveyor belt.

To serve on the court, a candidate must be at least 35 years of age, a citizen of Texas, licensed to practice law in Texas, and must have practiced law (or have been a lawyer and a judge of a court of record together) for at least ten years. The clerk of the Court, currently Blake A. Hawthorne, is appointed by the justices and serves a four-year term, which is renewable.

All members of the Texas Supreme Court typically belong to the same party because all are elected in statewide races, rather than by the electorates of smaller appellate districts, as the justices on the intermediate appellate courts are. Although there are fourteen such courts, the state is geographically divided into thirteen. Two appellate courts (the 1st and the 14th, sitting in Houston) serve coextensive districts covering ten counties, including Harris County. Recent proposals to reorganize the Texas appellate court system by consolidating districts, and creating a specialty court of appeals for government-entity cases, failed in the Texas legislature's 2021 regular session.

=== Judicial selection: appointments and elections ===
All members of the court are elected to six-year terms in statewide partisan elections. Because terms are staggered, only some justices face re-election in any one election cycle. When a vacancy arises, the governor of Texas appoints a replacement, subject to Senate confirmation, to serve out the unexpired term until December 31 after the next general election. The initial term of tenure is therefore often less than six years.

Like the Texas Court of Criminal Appeals, the Texas Supreme Court is composed entirely of Republicans. In the November 2026 elections, however, four Democrats—Maggie Ellis, Chari Kelly, Kristen Hawkins, and Gisela Triana—were elected to the court, reducing the Republican majority to 5–4 when their terms begin in January 2027.

=== Position designations and seniority ===
The position of chief justice is designated Place 1 and is held by Jimmy Blacklock. The other eight position numbers have no special significance except for identification purposes on the ballot. Informally, justices are ranked by seniority, and their profiles appear on the Court's website in that order. Unlike their counterparts on the U.S. Supreme Court, the official title of incumbents holding Place 2 through Place 9 is justice, rather than associate justice. Their counterparts on the Court of Criminal Appeals, however, use the title Judge.

=== Women on the Court ===
Hortense Sparks Ward, who became the first woman to pass the Texas bar examination in 1910, was appointed chief justice of a special all-woman Texas Supreme Court in 1925. The court was convened to hear Johnson v. Darr, a case involving the Woodmen of the World, a fraternal insurance organization to which the court's male justices belonged. After difficulties finding eligible male replacements, Governor Pat Neff appointed Ward, Hattie Leah Henenberg, and Ruth Virginia Brazzil to hear the case. The special court ultimately ruled in favor of Woodmen of the World.

Ruby Kless Sondock became the first woman to serve as a regular justice of the Texas Supreme Court in July 1982, following the death of Justice James G. Denton. She served until the end of his term in December of that year. In 1992, Rose Spector became the first woman elected to the court.

In the November 2026 elections, four women—Chari Kelly, Maggie Ellis, Kristen Hawkins, and Gisela Triana—won seats on the court. When their terms begin in January 2027, women will constitute a majority of the nine-member court for the first time in its history.

=== Current justices ===
Place	Name	Born	Start	Term ends	Mandatory retirement (Note: Under Article 5 of the Texas Constitution, justices who reach the age of 75 during the first four years of their 6-year term, must retire by December 31 of the fourth year of their term. If justices reach the age of 75 during the fifth or sixth year of their term, they will be able to serve out the remainder of their term.)	Party	Appointer	Law school
1	Jimmy Blacklock, Chief Justice	August 28, 1980 (age 46)	January 2, 2018 (Note: Took office as Chief Justice on January 7, 2025.)	2026	2056	Republican	Greg Abbott (R)	Yale
3	Debra Lehrmann	November 16, 1956 (age 70)	June 21, 2010	2028	2032	Republican	Rick Perry (R)	Texas
4	John P. Devine	October 3, 1958 (age 68)	January 1, 2013	2030	2034	Republican	—N/a (Note: Took office after being elected in a partisan election.)	South Texas
8	J. Brett Busby	April 12, 1973 (age 53)	February 21, 2019	2026	2048	Republican	Greg Abbott (R)	Columbia
6	Jane Bland	June 1, 1965 (age 61)	September 4, 2019	2030	2040	Republican	Greg Abbott (R)	Texas
5	Rebeca Huddle	July 7, 1973 (age 53)	October 30, 2020	2028	2048	Republican	Greg Abbott (R)	Texas
9	Evan Young	September 14, 1976 (age 50)	November 10, 2021	2028	2052	Republican	Greg Abbott (R)	Yale
2	James P. Sullivan	May 4, 1981 (age 45)	January 7, 2025	2026	2058	Republican	Greg Abbott (R)	Harvard
7	Kyle D. Hawkins	May 6, 1980 (age 46)	October 24, 2025	2026	2056	Republican	Greg Abbott (R)	Minnesota

=== Elected justices ===
Vacator	Reason	Start	Successor
Jimmy Blacklock	Defeated	January 2027	Maggie Ellis
Kyle D. Hawkins	Defeated	January 2027	Kristen Hawkins
James P. Sullivan	Defeated	December 2026	Chari Kelly
J. Brett Busby	Defeated	January 2027	Gisela Triana

=== Succession of seats ===
Chief Justice (Place 1)
Established by the Texas Constitution of 1876
G. Moore	Democratic	1878–1881
Gould	Democratic	1881–1882
Willie	Democratic	1882–1888
Stayton	Democratic	1888–1894
Gaines	Democratic	1894–1911
Brown	Democratic	1911–1915
N. Phillips	Democratic	1915–1921
Cureton	Democratic	1921–1940
W.F. Moore	Democratic	1940–1941
Alexander	Democratic	1941–1948
Hickman	Democratic	1948–1961
Calvert	Democratic	1961–1972
Greenhill	Democratic	1972–1982
Pope	Democratic	1982–1985
Hill	Democratic	1985–1988
Phillips	Republican	1988–2004
Jefferson	Republican	2004–2013
Hecht	Republican	2013–2024
Blacklock	Republican	2025–present

Place 2
Established by the Texas Constitution of 1876
Gould	Democratic	1876–1881
Stayton	Democratic	1881–1888
Walker	Democratic	1888–1889
Henry	Democratic	1889–1893
Brown	Democratic	1893–1911
Ramsey	Democratic	1911–1912
N. Phillips	Democratic	1912–1915
Yantis	Democratic	1915–1918
Greenwood	Democratic	1918–1934
Sharp	Democratic	1934–1952
Culver	Democratic	1953–1965
Pope	Democratic	1964–1982
T. Robertson	Democratic	1982–1988
Doggett	Democratic	1989–1994
Owen	Republican	1995–2005
Willett	Republican	2005–2018
Blacklock	Republican	2018–2025
Sullivan	Republican	2025–present

Place 3
Established by the Texas Constitution of 1876
G. Moore	Democratic	1876–1878
Bonner	Democratic	1878–1882
West	Democratic	1882–1885
S. Robertson	Democratic	1885–1886
Gaines	Democratic	1886–1894
Denman	Democratic	1894–1899
Williams	Democratic	1899–1911
Bibrell	Democratic	1911–1913
Hawkins	Democratic	1913–1921
Pierson	Democratic	1921–1935
Critz	Democratic	1935–1945
Simpson	Democratic	1945–1949
Harvey	Democratic	1949–1950
Calvert	Democratic	1950–1961
Steakley	Democratic	1961–1980
Wallace	Democratic	1981–1988
Cook	Republican	1988–1992
Spector	Democratic	1993–1998
O'Neill	Republican	1999–2010
Lehrmann	Republican	2010–present

Place 4
Established in 1918 as Commissioner, Section B
Made a Supreme Court judgeship in 1945
Sadler	Democratic	1918–1920
Powell	Democratic	1920–1927
Leddy	Democratic	1927–1933
Smedley	Democratic	1933–1954
Walker	Democratic	1954–1975
Doughty	Democratic	1975–1976
Yarbrough	Democratic	1976–1977
Barrow	Democratic	1977–1984
Gonzalez	Democratic	1984–1998
Gonzales	Republican	1999–2000
Jefferson	Republican	2001–2004
Medina	Republican	2004–2012
Devine	Republican	2013–present

Place 5
Established in 1918 as Commissioner, Section B
Made a Supreme Court judgeship in 1945
Montgomery	Democratic	1918–1919
Kittrell	Democratic	1919–1921
Hamilton	Democratic	1921
Short	Democratic	1925–1934
Taylor	Democratic	1935–1950
Wilson	Democratic	1950–1956
McCall	Democratic	1956
Norvell	Democratic	1957–1968
Reavley	Democratic	1968–1977
Chadick	Democratic	1977–1978
Campbell	Democratic	1978–1988
Culver	Republican	1988
Hightower	Democratic	1988–1996
Abbott	Republican	1996–2001
Rodriguez	Republican	2001–2002
Smith	Republican	2002–2004
Green	Republican	2005–2020
Huddle	Republican	2020–present

Place 6
Established in 1918 as Commissioner, Section A
Made a Supreme Court judgeship in 1945
Taylor	Democratic	1919–1921
Randolph	Democratic	1921–1923
Bishop	Democratic	1923–1927
Critz	Democratic	1927–1935
Hickman	Democratic	1935–1948
Garwood	Democratic	1948–1958
Hamilton	Democratic	1959–1970
Denton	Democratic	1971–1982
Sondock	Democratic	1982
Kilgarlin	Democratic	1983–1988
Hecht	Republican	1989–2013
Brown	Republican	2013–2019
Bland	Republican	2019–present

Place 7
Established in 1918 as Commissioner, Section B
Made a Supreme Court judgeship in 1945
McClendon	Democratic	1918–1923
Stayton	Democratic	1923–1925
Speer	Democratic	1925–1929
Ryan	Democratic	1929–1937
Martin	Democratic	1937–1939
Slatton	Democratic	1939–1947
Hart	Democratic	1947–1950
Smith	Democratic	1950–1970
Daniel	Democratic	1971–1978
Spears	Democratic	1979–1990
Cornyn	Republican	1991–1997
Hankinson	Republican	1997–2002
Wainwright	Republican	2002–2012
Boyd	Republican	2012–2025
Hawkins	Republican	2025-present

Place 8
Established in 1918 as Commissioner, Section A
Made a Supreme Court judgeship in 1945
Sonfield	Democratic	1918–1921
Gallagher	Democratic	1921–1923
Blanks	Democratic	1923–1924
Chapman	Democratic	1924–1925
Nickels	Democratic	1925–1929
Sharp	Democratic	1929–1934
German	Democratic	1935–1941
Brewster	Democratic	1941–1957
Greenhill	Democratic	1957–1972
H. Phillips	Democratic	1972
S. Johnson	Democratic	1973–1979
Garwood	Republican	1978–1980
Ray	Democratic	1980–1990
Gammage	Democratic	1990–1995
Baker	Republican	1995–2002
Schneider	Republican	2002–2004
P. Johnson	Republican	2004–2018
Busby	Republican	2019–present

Place 9
Established in 1918 as Commissioner, Section A
Made a Supreme Court judgeship in 1945
Strong	Democratic	1918–1920
Spencer	Democratic	1920–1923
German	Democratic	1923–1925
Harvey	Democratic	1925–1943
Folley	Democratic	1943–1949
Griffin	Democratic	1949–1968
McGee	Democratic	1969–1986
Mauzy	Democratic	1987–1992
Enoch	Republican	1993–2003
Brister	Republican	2003–2009
Guzman	Republican	2009–2021
Young	Republican	2021–present

== Supreme Court committees ==
Judicial Committee on Information Technology

The Judicial Committee on Information Technology (JCIT), established in 1997, advises the Supreme Court of Texas on the use of technology in the state's judicial system. Its responsibilities include developing recommendations concerning electronic filing, court case management systems, and standards for sharing information among courts and judicial agencies.
