= Women in Texas government =

Women have been underrepresented in all three branches of Texas state government. Texas has elected only three female governors, Miriam Ferguson, Ann Richards and Gina Hinojosa, in over 175 years since statehood, and many executive positions - such as Lieutenant Governor - have not once been filled by a woman. While the percentage of women in the Texas Legislature has increased over the past few legislative sessions, as of 2025, women in the Texas Legislature hold 61 out of 181 seats in the Texas House and Senate, making 33.7% of the Texas Legislature. The state's highest courts – the Supreme Court of Texas and the Texas Court of Criminal Appeals – have seen similarly low numbers of female justices, making up 33.3%. Women continue to make progress in the Legislature by running government agencies.Throughout this article, we will learn about some of the women in Texas Government. As well as how they have helped contribute to the Executive, Legislative, and Judicial Branch.

== Executive Branch ==
Women have been most present in the Texas executive branch as part of the State Board of Education. The first woman ever elected to statewide office in Texas was elected as Superintendent of Public Instruction (this position no longer exists; the duties of the former Superintendent of Public Instruction are now carried out by the appointed Commissioner of Education). At the urging of Texas suffragists, Annie Webb Blanton successfully ran for the position of Superintendent of Public Instruction in 1918. She won reelection in 1920 but did not seek a third term in 1922. After Blanton, several more women served as Superintendent of Public Instruction and on the State Board of Education once it was established in 1928. Currently, eight of the 15 members of the State Board of Education are women, including the board's secretary.

Outside of the State Board of Education, only ten women have held statewide executive office in Texas, either by election or appointment. Women have held the title of Governor, State Treasurer or Comptroller of Public Accounts (the State Treasurer position was officially abolished in 1996, at which point the Comptroller of Public Accounts assumed many of the duties formerly held by the State Treasurer), Railroad Commissioner, Land Commissioner, and Agriculture Commissioner. Women have most commonly been elected to the positions of State Treasurer or Comptroller of Public Accounts, sometimes using these positions as springboards to other elected executive offices. So far, no woman has acted as Lieutenant Governor or Attorney General. Although currently there still has yet to be a woman appointed as Attorney General there has been a woman who has served as an interim. Angela Colmenero, who has served in the Texas Attorney General's office since September 2018, was granted this interim opportunity in lieu of Ken Paxton's suspension.

Women elected to Texas executive office outside the State Board of Education
Name	Position	Term
Miriam Ferguson	Governor	1925–1927; 1933–1934
Ann Richards	State Treasurer Governor	1983–1990 1991–1994
Lena Guerrero	Railroad Commissioner	1991–1992
Kay Bailey Hutchison	State Treasurer	1991–1993
Martha Whitehead	State Treasurer	1993–1996
Carole Keeton Strayhorn	Railroad Commissioner Comptroller of Public Accounts	1994–1998 1999–2006
Elizabeth Ames Jones	Railroad Commissioner	2005–2012
Susan Combs	Comptroller of Public Accounts Agriculture Commissioner	2007–2014 1999–2006
Christi Craddick	Railroad Commissioner	2013–present
Jane Nelson	Secretary of State of Texas	2023–present
Dawn Buckingham	Land Commissioner	2023–present

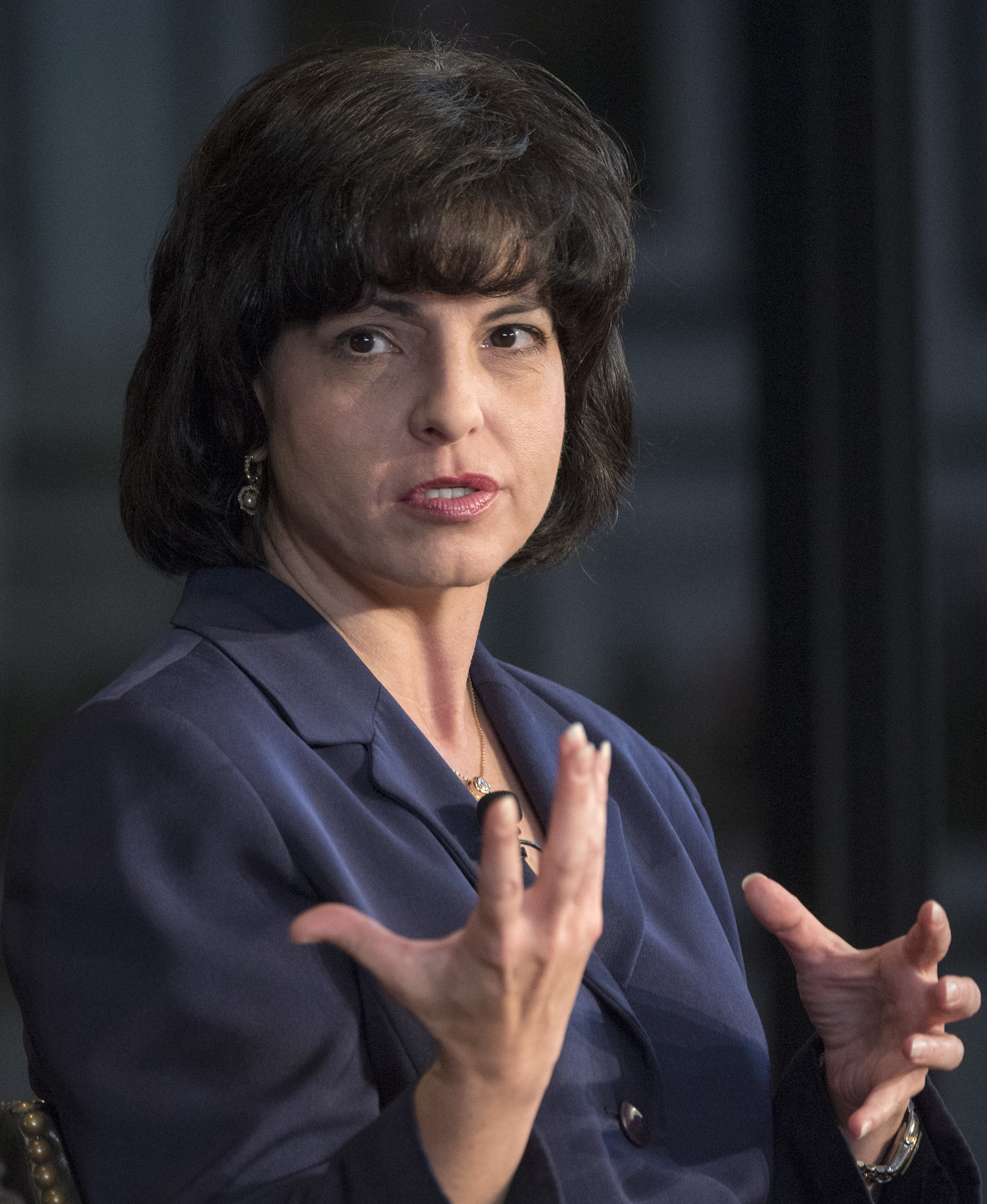
Currently, two women serve in statewide executive office outside the State Board of Education: Railroad Commissioner Christi Craddick and Land Commissioner Dawn Buckingham.

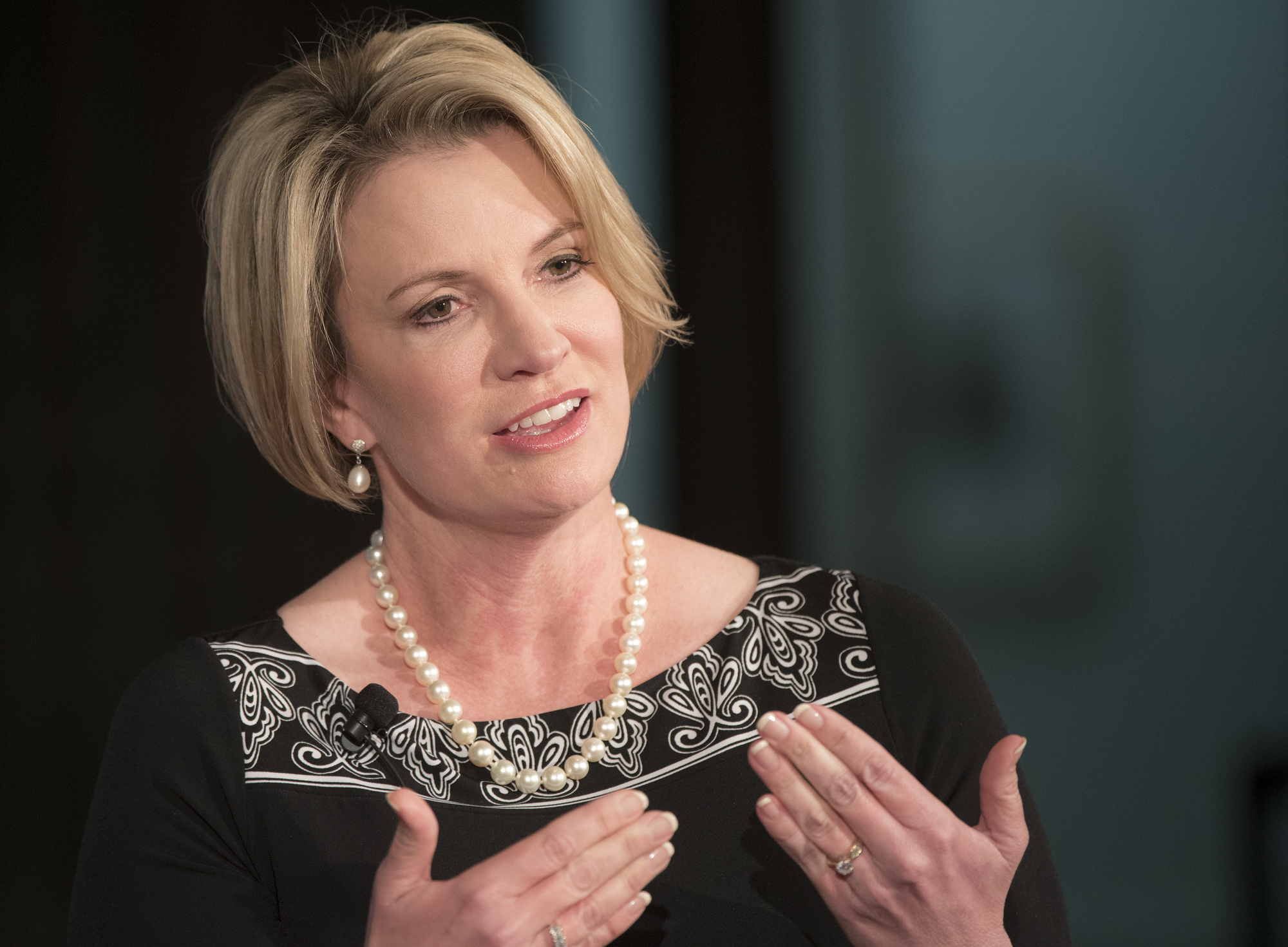
Dawn Buckingham

Texas has had only two female governors in its history. Miriam Ferguson (Democrat) became the state's first female governor in 1924. Her husband, James Ferguson (Democrat), had previously served as Texas governor but was unable to secure his place on the ballot in the 1924 election after being impeached in his last term. Instead, Miriam entered the race and ultimately won, carrying out her first term from 1925 to 1927. Scandals in her first administration caused Ferguson to lose her party's nomination in the 1926 election. Ferguson did not run in 1928. She did run in 1930 after the Supreme Court of Texas again denied her husband's petition to enter the race, but as in 1926, she failed to earn the Democratic Party nomination. In 1932, Ferguson ultimately won her bid for a second gubernatorial term and served this term from 1933 to 1935. In 1934, Ferguson temporarily retired from public office, only returning in 1940 for a final unsuccessful gubernatorial race. After Ferguson, Texas did not elect another female governor until Ann Richards (Democrat) over fifty years later in 1990. Richard first entered Texas local politics in 1976 as a Travis County Commissioner. She entered Texas state politics in 1982 when she won her first of two terms as Texas State Treasurer. Richards served only one term as governor from 1991 to 1995, losing her 1994 reelection bid.

While there have not been any female governors of Texas since Ann Richards, the number of women elected in the executive branch has increased since her election. Prior to 1990, Texans elected only two women to executive office outside the State Board of Education. The two women who were added in were Miriam "Ma" Ferguson, who held the office from 1925 to 1927 and again from 1933 to 1935; and Ann Richards, a Democrat, who served from 1991 to 1995. After 1990, Texans began regularly electing women to executive offices outside the State Board of Education, and a woman has consistently held at least one executive position since 1991.

== Legislative Branch ==
A total of 192 women have been elected to the Texas Legislature. One hundred sixty-one women have been elected to the Texas House of Representatives, and 23 women have been elected to the Texas Senate. The Texas House did not have more than two female representatives until the 41st Legislature in 1929. The 41st Legislature marked the first time more than one woman served in the House. It was not until the 46th Legislature in 1939 that women were regularly elected to the Texas House each session. No woman was elected to the Texas Senate until the 40th Legislature in 1927 when Margie E. Neal was elected for her first of four terms. Barbara Jordan became the first Black and queer woman elected to the Texas senate in 1966. After, Jordan served as a U.S. Representative, becoming known for her work as an author and educator. The Senate regularly had one female senator each session from the 50th Legislature in 1947 to the 67th Legislature 1981. In the 68th Legislature of 1983, no women were elected to the Texas Senate. It was not until the 69th Legislature in 1985 that the Senate began regularly electing women each session, and it was not until the 70th Session in 1987 that more than one woman was first elected to the Texas Senate.

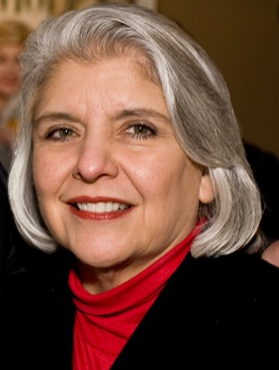
Judith Zaffirini is the longest serving woman in the Texas Senate. She has served from 1987 to the present.

Two of the longest-serving and highest-ranking women in the Texas Legislative Branch are Judith Zaffirini (Democrat) and Senfronia Thompson (Democrat). Zaffirini is the longest-serving and highest-ranking female and Hispanic senator. She has served 19 sessions in the Texas Senate, first winning election as the District 21 senator to the 1987 70th Legislature. She was the first Mexican American woman to be elected to the Senate and to serve as President Pro Tempore of the Senate, and she is currently the second-highest-ranking senator overall. In the House of Representatives, Senfronia Thompson is the longest-serving woman and African American legislator in the history of the Texas Legislature. Thompson first won election to the 63rd Legislature in 1972 and has served a total of 25 terms in office. She currently represents northeast Houston in District 141 and is Dean of the House of Representatives.

Zaffirini in particular has gained recognition for being a particularly effective legislator during her long tenure. Zaffirini has cast more consecutive votes than any other state or national legislator in America. In 2017, she was recognized for casting her 60,000th consecutive vote during the 85th Texas Legislature, and as of 2021, she has cast 67,923 votes. Zaffirini has a 100% perfect attendance record for Senate votes other than when she joined the Democratic Party's attempt to break Senate quorum in 2003 and refused to vote on a redistricting bill. In addition to casting the most votes of any Texas legislator, Zaffirini has also passed the most bills of any Texas legislator in state history. As of the end of the 87th Legislature in 2021, she has passed a total of 1,262 bills and 38 substantive resolutions. In the 85th Legislature, Zaffirini passed a personal record high 108 bills, despite serving in a Republican-majority chamber and needing signatures from a Republican governor. In the 87th Legislature, Zaffirini passed 106 bills, making her the legislator with the most bills passed for the fourth consecutive session.

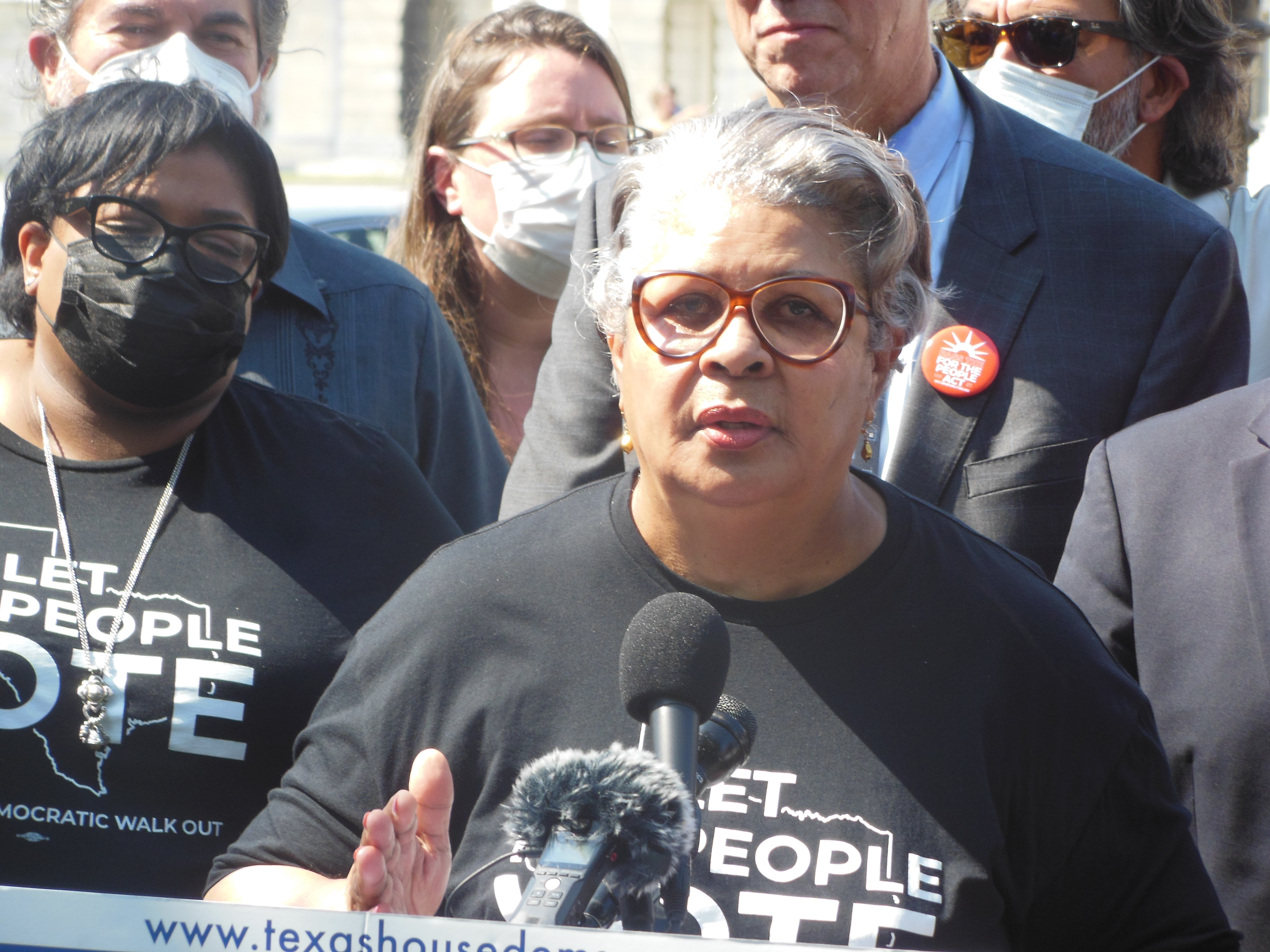
Senfronia Thompson is the longest serving woman in the Texas House of Representatives. She has served from 1973 to the present.

Despite the presence of notable women in office, according to the Center for American Women and Politics, Texas has consistently ranked in the bottom half of American states for its percentage of female state legislators. Between 1975 and 2021, Texas has had on average the 35th most female legislators of any state. Texas reached a high of 25th in the nation for percentage of female legislators in 2009 and 2010 - the only two years the state has been in the top half of states - and a low of 43rd in 1983 and 1984. Since women were first elected to the Texas Legislature in the 38th Session, women have comprised on average 8.5% of the Texas Legislature, with a low of 0.5% in 1923 and 1927 (excluding 1925 and 1937 when no women were elected to either chamber) and a high of 33.7% in 2025. Since the 38th Session, 8.7% of the House's 150 members have been female, while the Senate has averaged 7.5% female senators out of its 31 members. In any given session where at least one woman was elected, the House has had a maximum of 25.1% female members and a minimum of 0.6% female members, while the Senate has had a maximum of 32.3% female members and a minimum of 3.2% female members.

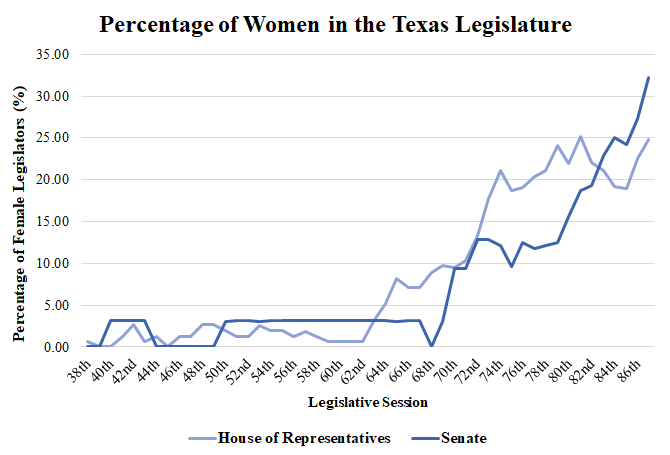
This graph shows the percentage of women in the Texas House of Representatives and the Texas Senate each legislative session. The graph begins with the 38th Legislature in 1923 because prior to this session, no women were elected to either chamber of the Texas Legislature. This graph reflects the percentage of the total number of representatives and senators who served in each legislative session. While at any given time the Texas House has no more than 150 members and the Texas Senate has no more than 31 members, the total number of members for the entire session may be slightly higher as certain legislators may serve for only part of the session.

== Judicial Branch ==
Only fourteen women have been elected to Texas's highest state courts - the Supreme Court of Texas (highest court for civil matters) and the Texas Court of Criminal Appeals (highest court for criminal matters). Additional women have served on these courts via gubernatorial appointment but have not been elected by voters to serve on the courts. Some women have begun their career on the courts through a governor's appointment but have then won subsequent election campaigns to serve new terms.

A key milestone for women's representation on the Supreme Court of Texas was the Texas All-Women Supreme Court of 1925. The All-Women Supreme Court was a special session of the Supreme Court of Texas in which Texas Governor Pat Morris Neff appointed three female justices to serve on the court to preside over a case in which all the court's male justices possessed a conflict of interest. The case involved a politically influential fraternal association known as the Woodmen of the World. At the time of the case, almost all Texas elected officials and lawyers were a part of the association. Realizing any male he could appoint would also likely have ties to the organization, Governor Neff resolved to appoint an all-female court. Neff appointed Hortense Sparks Ward to serve as the special court's Special Chief Justice. Ward had been the first woman to pass the Texas state bar exam, as well as the first Texas woman admitted to practice before the United States Supreme Court. Neff appointed Hattie Leah Henenberg and Ruth Virginia Brazzil to fill the remaining two spots. The All-Women Supreme Court met from January to May 1925 and was the first all-female court in the United States.

Despite the success of the All-Women Supreme Court, it would be another almost 60 years before women served on the Supreme Court of Texas again. In 1982, Ruby Kless Sondock became the first woman appointed as a regular justice on the Supreme Court of Texas. Governor William P. Clements appointed Sondock to serve out the remainder of the term of another justice who died in office. Once this initial term ended, Sondock did not seek election to the court. It would be another ten years before Texans would elect the first of six women to the Supreme Court of Texas. In 1992, Rose Spector became the first woman elected to the Supreme Court of Texas after previously serving as an elected county court judge and one of the first females elected to countywide office in Bexar County. Spector served only one term on the Supreme Court of Texas, while subsequent women have served up to two terms on the court. Currently, three elected women are serving on the Supreme Court of Texas, comprising a minority of the court's nine-justice membership. No woman has ever been elected Chief Justice of the Supreme Court of Texas.

Another major influence of specifically Latina women in history was Eva Guzman. She achieved a major milestone for representation by becoming the first Latina elected to a statewide office in Texas. She served with distinction on the Supreme Court of Texas for over a decade.

Women elected to the Supreme Court of Texas
Name	Term	Additional details
Rose Spector	1993–1998	
Priscilla R. Owen	1995–2005	
Deborah Hankinson	1999–2002	Appointed 1997
Harriet O'Neill	1999–2010	
Eva Guzman	2009–2021	Appointed 2009
Debra Lehrmann	2010–present	Appointed 2010
Jane Bland	2019–present	
Rebeca Huddle	2020–present	

In Texas Court of Criminal Appeals women have had increasing representation. Nine women have been elected to serve on the court, and four of the nine judges are currently women. These judges have contributed to the shaping of statewide criminal procedure. Sharon Keller was the first woman elected to the Texas Court of Criminal Appeals in 1994 and became a presiding judge 2001. Keller is also the only woman to hold that position until 2024, making her one of the longest-serving presiding judges in the court's history.

Women elected to the Texas Court of Criminal Appeals
Name	Term	Additional details
Sharon Keller	2001–2024	Judge: 1995–2000 Presiding Judge: 2001–2024
Verla Sue Holland	1997–2001	
Cheryl Johnson	1999–2016	
Barbara Hervey	2001–2024	
Cathy Cochran	2003–2014	Appointed 2001
Elsa Alcala	2013–2018	Appointed 2011
Michelle Slaughter	2019–2024	
Mary Lou Keel	2017–present	
Gina G. Parker	2025–present	Elected to Texas Court of Criminal Appeals in 2024.

== Qualifications and Requirements ==
Regardless of whether it's a male or female, to effectively serve in Texas government, representatives in certain positions have to meet different, but similar, requirements and qualifications. Firstly, to run for any general government position you must be a U.S. citizen and eighteen years of age or older. However, depending on how high the position is, the age requirements vary. For example, according to the Texas Constitution Article 4, to be a governor the person must be at least 30 and be a resident of Texas for five years or more before the election; additionally, the Lieutenant Governor holds the same qualifications.

Moreover, the Texas Legislative Branch also consists of Senators that must be 26 years old, a resident of Texas for five years, and a U.S. citizen that is qualified to vote. State Representatives follow a similar layout but are just required to be 21 years old and a resident for two years, as stated in Article 3 of The Texas Constitution.

The Texas Judicial Branch includes multiple courts, each with their own specific qualifications that judges must meet in order to serve their two, four, or six year terms. Starting with the Justice and Municipal Courts, there is no specific law or constitution that lists the requirements and are determined by the governing body of the city. Moving on to the County-Level Courts, the Constitutional County Courts do not require judges to hold a law license but they must still be well informed in the law of Texas. Judges part of the Statutory County Courts must be a U.S. citizen, a resident of Texas for at least two years, 25 years of age or older, and must be a licensed attorney who has practiced law or served as a judge for four years. Similarly, Statutory Probate Court Judges must meet the same qualifications as Statutory County Court Judges, except that they must have five years of judicial experience rather than four. Next, the Business Court requires the person to be age 35 or older, a U.S. and Texas citizen, a five-year Texas resident, and either a lawyer with ten years of experience in complex civil business litigation or transactional law, a judge of a court with civil jurisdiction, or a combination of both. Comparatively, District Courts follow the same qualifications of being a Texas and U.S. citizen but diff by only having to be 25-74 years old, resident of the district for 2 years, and a practice of being a lawyer or judge or both for eight years. Penultimate, 15th Court of Appeals and 1-14th Courts of Appeals both require U.S. and Texan citizenship, people 35-74 years of age, and be a "practicing lawyer, or lawyer and judge of court of record together, for at least 10 years." Lastly, the qualifications for Supreme Courts and Court of Criminal Appeals are: U.S. and Texan citizenship, age 35 to 74, an experienced lawyer, or lawyer and judge of court of record together, for at least 10 years.

In Texas, serving in the government requires meeting specific qualifications that vary depending on branch and office. Whether you are a male or female, all positions in the Executive, Legislative, and Judicial branches ensure that officials are U.S. and Texas citizens, have the legal knowledge and experience necessary to serve the people of Texas effectively.

== Women's contributions outside of the three branches ==
Historically, most positions in Texas and the federal government have been held and favored by men, and women have faced several challenges in voicing their political beliefs. Notably, Texas has only elected two female governors throughout its history. Women were not elected to the Texas Legislature until towards the end of the Progressive Era in 1923, when the state government elected its first female representative, Edith Wilmans. Wilmans represented District 50 (Dallas County) in the Texas House for one term during the 38th Legislature in 1923. Typically, women are often put at a disadvantage due to their restrictions in the past, where men have always had rights and assumed leadership. However, this doesn't exactly mean they are completely shut out of politics. Women have and still are helping out with government agencies outside of the legislature.

Although women have a history of being outsiders in Texas Government, they have made notable contributions to the state through government agencies, one including the Texas Alliance of Child and Family Services. Lesley Guthrie, a state director of community relations and business development, has helped the Texas Alliance of Child and Family Services for more than two decades, bringing awareness to women's health issues and their need for employment. Unlike the House of Representatives, women like Lesley account for nearly half of the Texas Workforce Commission (TWC) today, where they help provide workforce development to employers and job seekers in Texas.

A 2020 study funded by the Jane Nelson Institute for Women's Leadership was conducted to observe the representation of women in elected office in 2020, where comparisons showed that women are still underrepresented in Texas government, accounting for only 32% of Texas elected officials. Texas Women's University (TWU) used this research project to advocate for increasing the representation of women in Texas government in 2020 by supporting progress in education, politics, and society.

The Texas Department of Criminal Justice (TDJC) is the publisher of 'The Victim's Informer', a quarterly newsletter of the TDJC Victim Services Division, Texas Crime Victim Clearinghouse. Each year, Governor Greg Abbott's Commission for Women, which focuses on promoting opportunities for women in Texas, tasks the State Agency Council to recognize the professional efforts of individuals by presenting them with the Outstanding Women in Texas Government Award. Angie McCowen was the 2024 recipient of the award. The agency who presents this award was established in 1983 by Governor Mark White. This award is a biennial award given to those women who have stood out in Texas government and who have helped contribute to the agencies they serve in.

Executive Women in Texas Government (EWTG) is a nonpartisan organization that was founded in 1984 by six women who believed that supporting the development of future women is important to place them in high-level positions of Texas government. EWTG offers scholarships to its members to further their education, organizes events to network and receive peer support, and hosts professional development conferences every year.

The Texas Executive Women (TEW) nonprofit organization was founded in 1979 by female executive professionals from all industries and professions, as a sponsorship for women through program creation and support. The Women on the Move (WOM) event, hosted by TEW in 1985, as a celebration of professional achievement. The success of the inaugural event led to the organization forming the 501 (c) (3), Texas Executive Women's Scholarship Fund, where proceeds from each annual WOM luncheon are reserved for educating women.

Five women, the largest number ever, were elected to the state house of representatives, including Sarah Weddington, the plaintiff's lawyer in Roe v. Wade. The visibility of Hispanic women at the state level was limited before the rise of the Raza Unida party (1970). Although active in organizations such as the League of United Latin American Citizens, they had no influence in mainstream state politics. In 1972 Alma Canales ran for lieutenant governor, thus becoming the first Hispanic woman to seek high state office; though she lost, Hispanic women in Crystal City, the birthplace of La Raza Unida, won county offices. Mujeres por la Raza groups, organized by Martha P. Cotera, encouraged more Hispanic women to seek office; two ran unsuccessfully for the legislature in 1974, and in 1976 Irma Rangel became the first to win a seat in the house.

Another educator and attorney was Irma Rangel. She was the first Hispanic woman elected into the Texas House of Representatives in 1976. She is now the face of Irma Lerma Rangel College of Pharmacy at Texas A&M.
