= All-Woman Supreme Court =

1925 special session of the Texas Supreme Court

The All-Woman Supreme Court refers to a special session of the Supreme Court of Texas which met in 1925. The court consisted of Hortense Sparks Ward, who was appointed special chief justice, Hattie Leah Henenberg, and Ruth Virginia Brazzil. It sat for five months, ruling on the case Johnson v. Darr, and was the first all-female supreme court in the history of the United States.

== Background ==
The roots of the All-Woman Supreme Court lay in a lawsuit which originated in El Paso and reached the state supreme court in 1924. The case, styled Johnson v. Darr (114 Tex. 516), involved a so-called "secret trust" under which the Woodmen of the World were claiming ownership of two tracts of land in the city. The high court was asked to review the decision made by the El Paso Court of Civil Appeals in the case.

The case involved a lien on two tracts of land owned by the Woodmen in El Paso. A group of trustees from the group deeded both pieces to F. P. Jones, and the deed was properly recorded. That same day, Jones signed an agreement to hold the property in trust for the trustees and deed it back upon request. This was not recorded. Jones's creditors, including W. T. Johnson, claimed the land as payment for debts, whereupon the trustees brought suit to establish the agreement and prevent a transfer of the land. The trial court held for the defendants on one piece of property, and for the plaintiffs on the other. The El Paso Court of Civil Appeals held for the Woodmen on both.

The Woodmen of the World were very influential in Texas politics, and nearly all of the state's elected officials were members, as were most lawyers. Consequently, most of the state's judges and attorneys had enough personal interest in cases involving the organization that they would have to recuse themselves. The state supreme court was no exception, and on March 8, 1924, Chief Justice Calvin Maples Cureton indicated to Governor of Texas Pat Morris Neff that he and associate justices Thomas B. Greenwood and William Pierson were members of the Woodmen, and as such would have to recuse themselves from the case.

Texas law indicated that in instances such as this, the governor should act immediately and as quickly as possible to find replacements for the justices in question. Even so, the longtime Deputy Clerk of the Supreme Court, H. L. Clamp, later recorded that Governor Neff tried for ten months to find male judges or lawyers to sit on the court, but to no avail; every one approached responded that he, too, was a member of the Woodmen and could not sit on the court. Not until the first day of 1925 – one week before the case was to be heard – did he hit upon a solution; as the Woodmen were a fraternal organization, and accepted no female members, he would appoint a court made up of only women. Discreet inquiries revealed that as long as the women were eligible under Texas law to serve in the position, there should be no barrier to their appointment.

Neff's choice was particularly appropriate given the fact that he was the first Texas governor with a female private secretary and his record of appointing women to all state boards and commissions throughout his term of office. Furthermore, women were gaining more power in Texas politics throughout the decade; the state's first female governor, Miriam A. Ferguson, was scheduled to be inaugurated later in the month, and it was seven years both since Texas women had gained suffrage and since the first woman, Annie Webb Blanton, was elected to statewide office. Furthermore, in 1922 Edith Wilmans had become the first woman elected to the Texas House of Representatives. Even so, there was little precedent for such an action, and the governor is often said to have taken it only after all other avenues had been exhausted.

== Court ==
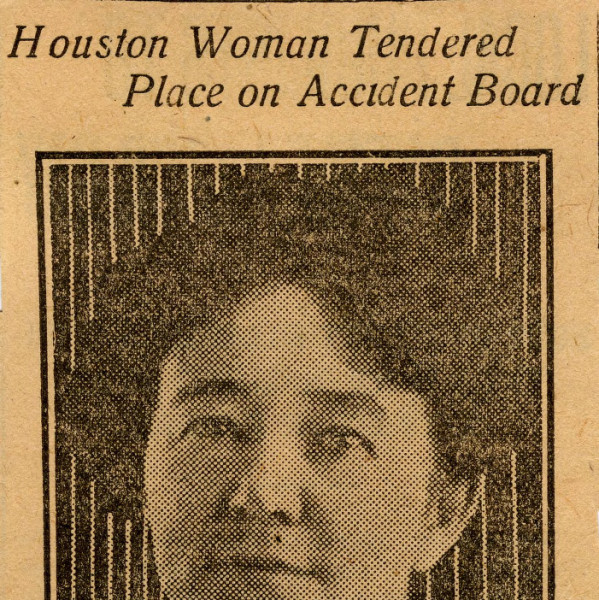
Hortense Sparks Ward

The first three women appointed to the court were Wilmans, a lawyer in practice in Dallas; Nellie Gray Robertson of Granbury, county attorney of Hood County; and Hortense Sparks Ward of Houston, also in private practice. Robertson was designated chief justice. Problems soon appeared in the composition of the court. First, on January 5, Wilmans announced her resignation; she lacked by two months the required seven years' experience practicing law in the state. She was replaced by another woman from Dallas, Hattie Leah Henenberg. Next, Robertson also announced that she had to step down, having only practiced law in Texas for six years and nine months. She was replaced by Ruth Virginia Brazzil of Galveston only one day before the case was to be heard. Ward was appointed special chief justice. Neff was lucky that the appointments stuck, as he had only about two dozen other women licensed to practice before the state from whom he could choose.

The court sat for five months, during which time the three male justices conducted all other business as usual. Its first meeting, on January 8, was noted in that morning's edition of The New York Times. Chief Justice Cureton administered the oath to the three justices; the ceremony was attended by the other associates, Attorney General of Texas Dan Moody, Clerk of Court Fred Connerly, and several journalists. No women were among the crowd. The chief justice indicated that there were three possible dispositions in the case; either the court could refuse to grant a writ of error or affirm the decision of the local court, in effect refusing to hear the appeal, or it could grant the writ and hear the appeal. The writ was granted, and Ward announced that the appeal would be heard on January 30.

Ultimately, the question which had to be decided concerned recording of the trust agreement, and whether or not it should be noted down prior to the lodging of the creditors' claim. At the time, trust agreements did not need to be recorded for them to be legally binding, and the court had to decide whether or not placing a trust on record can keep it from being called in as debt payment.

== Decision and aftermath ==
The special court handed down its unanimous decision, in favor of the Woodmen, on May 23, 1925. Ward wrote the majority opinion, in support of the decision by the El Paso Court of Appeals; concurring opinions were written by associate justices Brazzil and Henenberg. The decision was based mainly on an upholding of the state law regarding secret trusts and deeds. Thereafter the court disbanded.

It would be thirty years before women were legally allowed to serve on juries in the state of Texas. Furthermore, women would not serve on the state supreme court again until 1982, when on July 25 Ruby Kless Sondock became the court's first regular female justice, when she was appointed to replace Associate Justice James G. Denton who had died of a heart attack. Sondock served the remainder of Denton's term, which ended on December 31, 1982, but did not seek election to the Supreme Court in her own right. Rose Spector became the first woman elected to the court in 1992 and served until 1998 when she was defeated by Harriet O'Neill. It would be 66 years (2015) before another state high court, this time the Minnesota Supreme Court, contained more women than men.

Johnson v. Darr has since its decision been cited as legal precedent for over thirty cases. In only one of those citations was the gender of the court even mentioned.
