= Nellie Gray Robertson =

American politician

Nellie Gray Robertson (February 28, 1894 – May 20, 1955) was a lawyer and jurist in Texas. She was nominated to the All-Woman Supreme Court of 1925, though she did not serve in the position. She was the first female county attorney in the state.

== Life and career ==
Robertson was a native of Granbury, and was the youngest of six children of William Jarrett and Arminda Barton Robertson. Her father left the family soon after her birth, and her mother struggled with poverty as he drifted in and out of her life for some years before dying in Louisiana in 1910. Nellie's elder brothers provided for the family; her mother was eligible for a Confederate widow's pension, but she did not begin to get money from it until 1937.

Robertson graduated from Granbury High School in 1912 and, determined to study law, enrolled in the University of Texas at Austin that fall; women in Texas would not begin to be licensed as attorneys until the following year. She graduated in 1918. That year she became the state's first female county attorney; she had run unopposed in the Democratic Party primary in July, and in November received 446 out of 448 votes cast. She ran again in 1920, prevailing over her primary opponent and running unopposed in the general election. As the role of county attorney was only a part-time one, in 1921 Robertson opened the Hood County Abstract Company, whose owner and operator she remained until 1925. She ran for county judge in the 1922 primary, but lost; she was reappointed to her old position in 1923, when the new county attorney resigned his post, and was reelected once more in 1924. Besides serving the county, Robertson was an officer of the Texas District & County Attorneys Association, being elected its secretary and treasurer in 1921. She was appointed a district judge in 1922 when the regular local judge was disqualified on a case. She contemplated for a time running for the Texas State Legislature, but retired from public life in 1926 instead.

When, in 1924, a case involving the Woodmen of the World came up before the Supreme Court of Texas, all three justices were required to recuse themselves due to their ties with the organization; many other male attorneys and jurists in the state had similar ties, and a new Court could not be empaneled. After deliberation, Governor of Texas Pat M. Neff hit upon a solution to the problem: he would name three women to the special court instead, as the Woodmen were a fraternal organization and so had no female members. Robertson was chosen as acting chief justice; the associate justices were Edith Wilmans and Hortense Sparks Ward. In the end, neither Robertson nor Wilmans proved to be eligible, as neither had the required seven years' experience practicing law in Texas; Robertson missed the qualification by three months. Both women were replaced on the court, by Hattie Leah Henenberg and Ruth Virginia Brazzil. Robertson proved sanguine about her position; when asked how she felt about missing the chance to be remembered as the first female chief justice on a United States high court, she responded simply, "It is what it is."

After leaving office Robertson moved to New York City, where she worked writing law books for Doubleday Publishing. By 1930 she had returned to her home state, soon operating Stewart Title in Beaumont; also in that town she practiced law as a member of the firm of Stewart, Burgess, Morris & Robertson. She was an associate lay leader for the local district of the Central Texas Methodist Conference, and a grand matron of the Order of the Eastern Star as well. In her private life she was known for her skill at poker.

Robertson never married. She retired in 1954 and died the next year of complications from diabetes; she is interred in the Granbury Cemetery. She had died in Granbury while visiting from Beaumont. In 2015 a Texas Historical Commission marker was erected in her honor in her hometown, before the courthouse where she had practiced and had her office.
