= Eugene Cook =

Eugene Cook may refer to:

- Eugene A. Cook, Associate Justice of the Texas Supreme Court
- Eugene Cook (musician), leader of the band Synco Six, one-time band of musician Alphonse Trent
- Eugene Cook (Georgia judge), Associate Justice of the Supreme Court of Georgia

== See also ==
- Gene Cook, American football player
