= William W. Kilgarlin =

American judge (1932–2012)

William Wayne Kilgarlin (November 29, 1932 – November 5, 2012) was a justice of the Supreme Court of Texas from January 1, 1983 to December 31, 1988.

Political offices
Preceded by Ruby Kless Sondock	Justice of the Texas Supreme Court; 1983–1988	Succeeded by Nathan Hecht
