= Vertical Limit =

2000 film by Martin Campbell

- Theatrical release poster
- Directed by: Martin Campbell
- Screenplay by: Robert King; Terry Hayes
- Story by: Robert King
- Produced by: Martin Campbell; Robert King; Marcia Nasatir; Lloyd Phillips
- Starring: Chris O'Donnell; Bill Paxton; Robin Tunney; Scott Glenn; Izabella Scorupco; Temuera Morrison
- Cinematography: David Tattersall
- Edited by: Thom Noble
- Music by: James Newton Howard
- Production company: Columbia Pictures
- Distributed by: Sony Pictures Releasing
- Release date: December 8, 2000
- Running time: 124 minutes
- Country: United States
- Language: English
- Budget: $75 million
- Box office: $215.7 million

Vertical Limit is a 2000 American survival thriller film directed by Martin Campbell, written by Robert King, and starring Chris O'Donnell, Bill Paxton, Robin Tunney, and Scott Glenn. The film was released on December 8, 2000, in the United States by Columbia Pictures, receiving mixed reviews and grossed $215 million at the box office.

The plot follows a rescue attempt on K2, the second-highest mountain in the world, after a team of climbers are trapped in a crevasse.

The film was the third collaboration between Campbell and actor Stuart Wilson, after No Escape (1994) and The Mask of Zorro (1998).

== Plot ==
While rock climbing in Monument Valley, a freak accident puts adult siblings Peter and Annie and their father Royce Garrett in a deadly situation. Royce verbally pushes Peter that, to save his sister, he must cut Royce's safety rope, causing Royce to fall to his death.

Three years later, Peter has retired from climbing and works for National Geographic, while Annie has become a renowned mountaineer. Their relationship is strained, as Annie blames Peter for their father's death. Peter reunites with Annie at the K2 base camp, where she is planning a summit attempt, as part of an expedition funded by billionaire Elliot Vaughn. He has paid renowned climber Tom McLaren a staggering $1 million to lead the team.

The night before the climb, Vaughn throws a massive party, where he is criticized by respected climber Montgomery Wick. It's later revealed that Wick's wife, an expedition guide, died during Vaughn's previous expedition. Vaughn claims they were hit by a storm and Wick's wife died of pulmonary edema because her supply of dexamethasone (or "dex") was swept away. Wick doesn't believe that story and has been trying to find his wife's body.

Vaughn's team begins their K2 summit attempt but are warned of an approaching storm. McLaren wants to turn back, but Vaughn threatens to ruin him if they don't continue. An avalanche traps Annie, Vaughn and McLaren in a crevasse, while the other two people in their group are killed. Radio contact is lost, but Annie uses Morse code through static to signal that the trio are alive. Peter assembles a rescue team of climbers, split into three pairs: himself and Wick; Kareem, a cousin of one of the summit team, and Malcolm, one of two brothers to have summited before and hang around base camp; and Monique, base camp’s nurse who joins for the monetary reward, and Cyril, Malcolm’s brother. After a treacherous helicopter drop-off, each pair takes a different path to increase the chances of success. They also carry canisters of explosive nitroglycerine, donated by the Pakistani army, to clear the entrance to the crevasse.

When Cyril loses his balance at the edge of a cliff, Monique attempts to rescue him. Their nitro canister falls over the cliff and explodes, causing another avalanche and killing Cyril. At the military station, the nitroglycerine canisters are exposed to sunlight and also explode. Base camp tells the rescue teams to get their cases of nitro into the shade, which Kareem and Malcolm do, but their canister leaks fluid and explodes anyway, killing them both. Monique then joins Peter and Wick's team.

Underground, McLaren is severely injured and has lost his supply of dex. Annie wants to share her supply with McLaren, but Vaughn discourages her in the belief they will need it for themselves and McLaren will die regardless. Annie risks her life to retrieve a backpack across the crevasse and obtains more dexamethasone, which she administers to McLaren and herself, as they are both suffering from pulmonary edema.

Wick finally discovers his wife's body and an empty dex container nearby suggests that Vaughn stole hers, ensuring his own survival while leaving her to die. Monique, Peter and Wick camp for the night, but Peter is wary of Wick, who seems focused on taking revenge. Wick awakens to find that Peter and Monique have left him.

In the crevasse, Annie falls asleep and Vaughn kills McLaren to avoid having to give him more dex. Annie and Vaughn mark the crevasse entrance by detonating a flare inside a bag of McLaren's blood, which explodes over the snow. Peter and Monique see the marker and use nitro to blast a hole, enabling access to the survivors. They drop a rope and Vaughn harnesses Annie.

Wick arrives, descends into the cave and attaches a clip to Vaughn. Monique and Peter attempt to pull Annie out of the crevasse, but an ice boulder falls, knocking Wick and Vaughn from the ledge in the crevasse and pulling Annie and Peter down. Monique alone remains on the ledge holding the rope from which the other four are dangling. This creates a scenario similar to the opening scene. To save Annie and Peter and to take revenge against Vaughn, Wick cuts his rope and he and Vaughn fall to their deaths bringing the toll to six (including Royce) for Peter to repeatedly save Annie.

Recovering at base camp, Annie reconciles with Peter, who pays his respects at a makeshift memorial for climbers who have died on the mountain.

== Cast ==
- Chris O'Donnell as Peter Garrett
- Bill Paxton as Elliot Vaughn
- Robin Tunney as Annie Garrett
- Scott Glenn as Montgomery Wick
- Izabella Scorupco as Monique Aubertine
- Temuera Morrison as Major Rasul
- Stuart Wilson as Royce Garrett
- Nicholas Lea as Tom McLaren
- Alexander Siddig as Kareem Nazir
- Robert Taylor as Skip Taylor
- Roshan Seth as Colonel Amir Salim
- David Hayman as Frank "Chainsaw" Williams
- Ben Mendelsohn as Malcolm Bench
- Steve Le Marquand as Cyril Bench

In addition, mountaineer Ed Viesturs has a cameo as himself.

== Production ==
In the summer of 1996, Phoenix Pictures purchased Vertical Limit for $1 million, an action drama about a group of mountain climbers who must scale K2 on a rescue mission to save other climbers, from Robert King for development. In May 1997, it was reported Stuart Baird had signed on to direct Vertical Limit as a potential project once he was done directing U.S. Marshals. In March 1998, Roger Spottiswoode was signed to direct the film with TriStar Pictures committed to financing and distributing. In February 1999, Martin Campbell was in final negotiations to direct, with TriStar's sister studio Columbia Pictures replacing TriStar as distributor.

Vertical Limit was filmed on location in Pakistan (location of K2), Queenstown, New Zealand and the United States.

Bell 212 helicopters contracted from Hevilift Australia were painted in a khaki green colour to represent the Pakistani Army.

== Reception ==
=== Box office ===
Vertical Limit grossed $69.2 million domestically and $215.7 million worldwide, becoming the 17th-highest-grossing film of 2000. Against a budget of $75 million, the film was a success.

In the United States, the film opened at No.1 during its first day of release, December 8, earning an estimated $5.1 million and overtaking How the Grinch Stole Christmas, which had been No.1 since November 17. On its opening weekend, the film finished second at the box office, with $15.5 million.

=== Critical reception ===
Vertical Limit received mixed reviews from critics, as the film holds a 49% rating on Rotten Tomatoes based on 111 reviews, with an average rating of 5.2/10. The website's critical consensus reads: "The plot in Vertical Limit is ludicrously contrived and clichéd. Meanwhile, the action sequences are so over-the-top and piled one on top of another, they lessen the impact on the viewer". On Metacritic, the film has a weighted average score of 48 out of 100, based on 29 critics, indicating "mixed or average reviews". The movie has the rating of on Allmovie.com. According to free-soloing legend Alex Honnold, the unrealistic opening scene is "horrendous and probably the worst scene in all of Hollywood climbing". Audiences polled by CinemaScore gave the film an average grade of "B" on an A+ to F scale.

Roger Ebert gave the film three stars out of four, commenting, "It's made from obvious formulas and pulp novel conflicts, but strongly acted and well crafted... 'Vertical Limit' delivers with efficiency and craft, and there are times, when the characters are dangling over a drop of a mile, when we don't even mind how it's manipulating us." James DiGiovanna of Tucson Weekly called Vertical Limit "the best mountain-climbing movie starring Chris O'Donnell to come out this week." Philip French of The Guardian mentioned, "Campbell sustains the tension pretty well and the settings are spectacular. More interesting than the characters, however, are two aspects of the dramatic background. The first is an isolated army post on a mountain peak from which ill-equipped Pakistani soldiers fire an artillery barrage every afternoon in the direction of India as an absurd daily ritual. David Ansen of Newsweek wrote, "Vertical Limit produces a decidedly split reaction in an audience. You gasp at the action sequences, then giggle at the drama, then gasp, then giggle until finally the filmmakers pile on one cliffhanger too many. By that point, the gasps have become muted by sheer disbelief... Alternately generating adrenaline and ennui, Vertical Limit battles itself to a hard-earned draw."

== Novelization ==
A novelization of the film was released in paperback in 2000 written with the assistance of the screenplay authors.
