= Marcia Nasatir =

American film producer (1926–2021)

- Marcia Nasatir, from a 1977 newspaper photo
- Born: Marcia Birenberg; May 8, 1926; Brooklyn, New York
- Died: August 3, 2021 (aged 95); Woodland Hills, California
- Occupations: Film producer, studio executive
- Relatives: Rose Spector (sister)

Marcia Nasatir (May 8, 1926 – August 3, 2021) was an American film producer and studio executive. She was the first female vice-president of a major movie studio, when she became a vice-president at United Artists in 1974.

== Early life ==
Marcia Birenberg was born in Brooklyn and raised in San Antonio, Texas, the daughter of Jack Birenberg and Sophie Weprinsky Birenberg. Her parents were both Russian Jewish immigrants; her father was in the garment trade. Birenberg graduated from Thomas Jefferson High School in 1943. She attended Northwestern University and the University of Texas at Austin, but did not earn a degree at either school. Her sister Rose Spector was a judge, and the first woman elected to the Texas Supreme Court.

== Career ==
Nasatir was a divorced mother of two young sons in 1955, when she took a secretarial job with Grey Advertising in New York. "I didn’t need to watch Mad Men — I lived it", she later quipped. She worked as an editor at Dell Publishing and Bantam Books, and as a literary agent with the Ziegler Diskant Agency, where she represented screenwriters including Robert Towne and William Goldman.

Nasatir became a story editor at United Artists (UA) in 1974, with the title of vice-president of West Coast Development. Nasatir was the first female vice-president of a major film studio. Among the films she developed at UA were Rocky (1976), Carrie (1976), and F.I.S.T. (1978). In 1978, when Mike Medavoy, Arthur Krim, and three other partners left UA to form Orion Pictures, she became a vice-president at Orion.

At Carson Entertainment and later as an independent producer, Nasatir was one of the executive producers of The Big Chill (1983), Vertical Limit (2000), Death Defying Acts (2007), and the documentary Elle (2013), and a producer of Hamburger Hill (1987) and Ironweed (1987). She produced a number of television movies, including Stormy Weathers (1992), The Spider and the Fly (1994), The Courtyard (1995), The Ultimate Lie (1996), A Match Made in Heaven (1997), She made two on-screen film cameos, in Heart Beat (1980) and The Mummy: Tomb of the Dragon Emperor (2008), and appeared in several documentaries, including The Big Chill: A Reunion (1999), The Human Face of Big Data (2014), Reel Herstory: The Real Story of Reel Women (2014), A Classy Broad: Marcia's Adventures in Hollywood (2016), and What She Said: The Art of Pauline Kael (2018).

In 2008, Nasatir found a new audience on YouTube, in Reel Geezers, a film criticism web series, co-starring with her friend, screenwriter Lorenzo Semple Jr. From 2013 to 2017, she served on the board of the SAG-AFTRA Foundation.

== Personal life ==
Marcia married music industry executive Mort L. Nasatir in 1947. They had two sons, Mark and Seth, before they divorced in 1953. She died in 2021, aged 95 years, in Woodland Hills, California. Her papers are archived in the Margaret Herrick Library, Academy of Motion Picture Arts and Sciences.
