= James P. Wallace =

American judge (1928–2017)

James Price Wallace (April 8, 1928 – April 17, 2017) was a justice of the Supreme Court of Texas from January 1, 1981 to September 1, 1988.

Political offices
Preceded by Zollie Steakley	Justice of the Texas Supreme Court; 1981–1988	Succeeded by Eugene A. Cook
