= Government of Texas =

Government of the U.S. state of Texas

- Seal of Texas
- Part of: United States of America
- Constitution: Constitution of Texas

Legislative branch
- Name: Legislature
- Type: Bicameral
- Meeting place: Texas State Capitol
- Upper house
- Name: Senate
- Presiding officer: Dan Patrick, President
- Lower house
- Name: House of Representatives
- Presiding officer: Dustin Burrows, Speaker

Executive branch
- Head of state and government
- Title: Governor
- Currently: Greg Abbott
- Appointer: Election
- Cabinet
- Leader: Governor
- Deputy leader: Lieutenant Governor
- Headquarters: Texas State Capitol

Judicial branch
- Name: Judiciary of Texas
- Courts: Courts of Texas
- Supreme Court of Texas
- Chief judge: Jimmy Blacklock
- Seat: Austin

The government of Texas operates under the Constitution of Texas and consists of a unitary democratic state government operating under a presidential system that uses the Dillon Rule, as well as governments at the county and municipal levels.

Austin is the capital of Texas. The State Capitol resembles the United States Capitol in Washington, D.C., but is faced in Texas pink granite and is topped by a statue of the "Goddess of Liberty" holding aloft a five-point Texas star. The capitol is also notable for purposely being built seven feet taller than the U.S. national capitol.

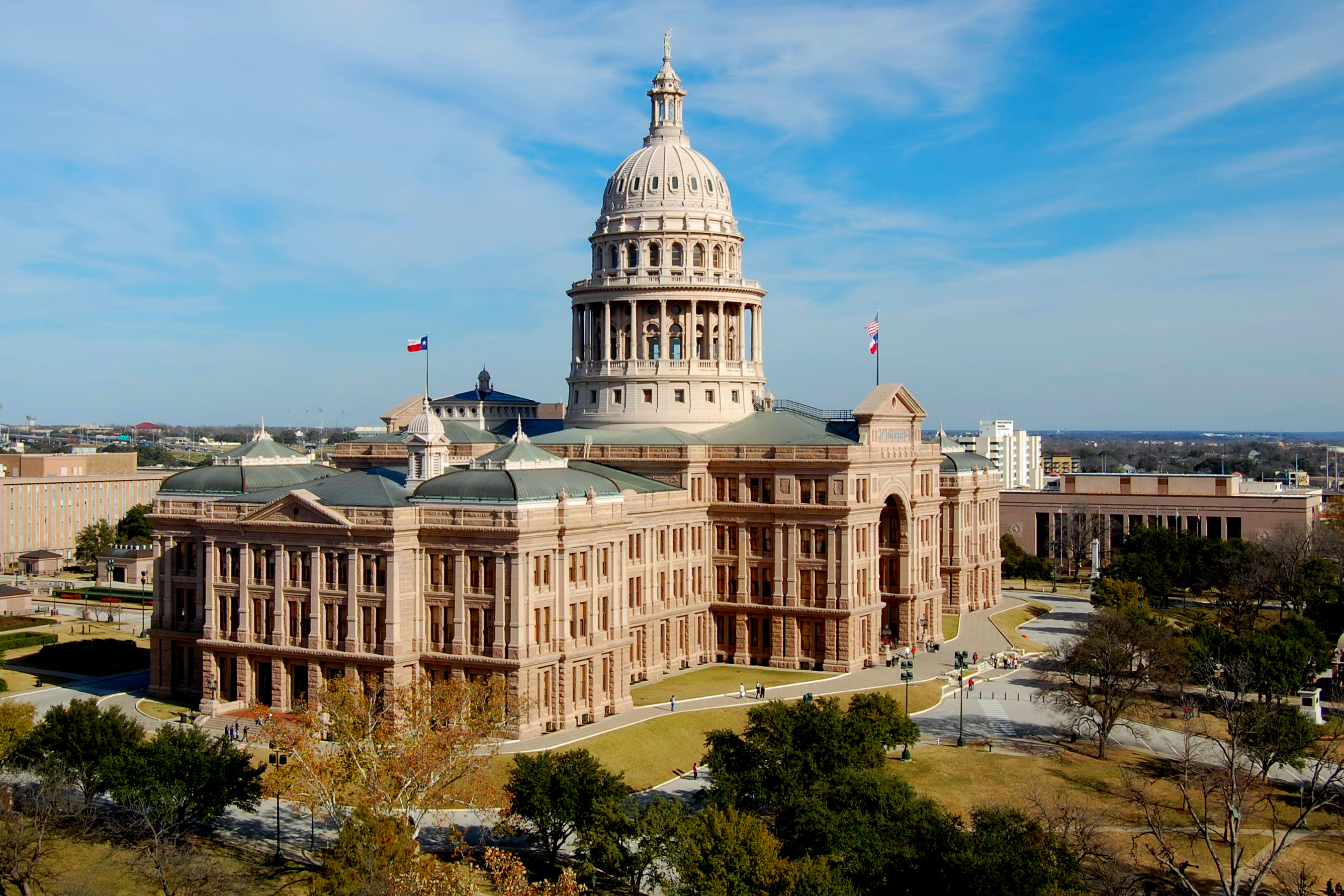
Texas State Capitol

== Executive ==
The statewide elected officials are:

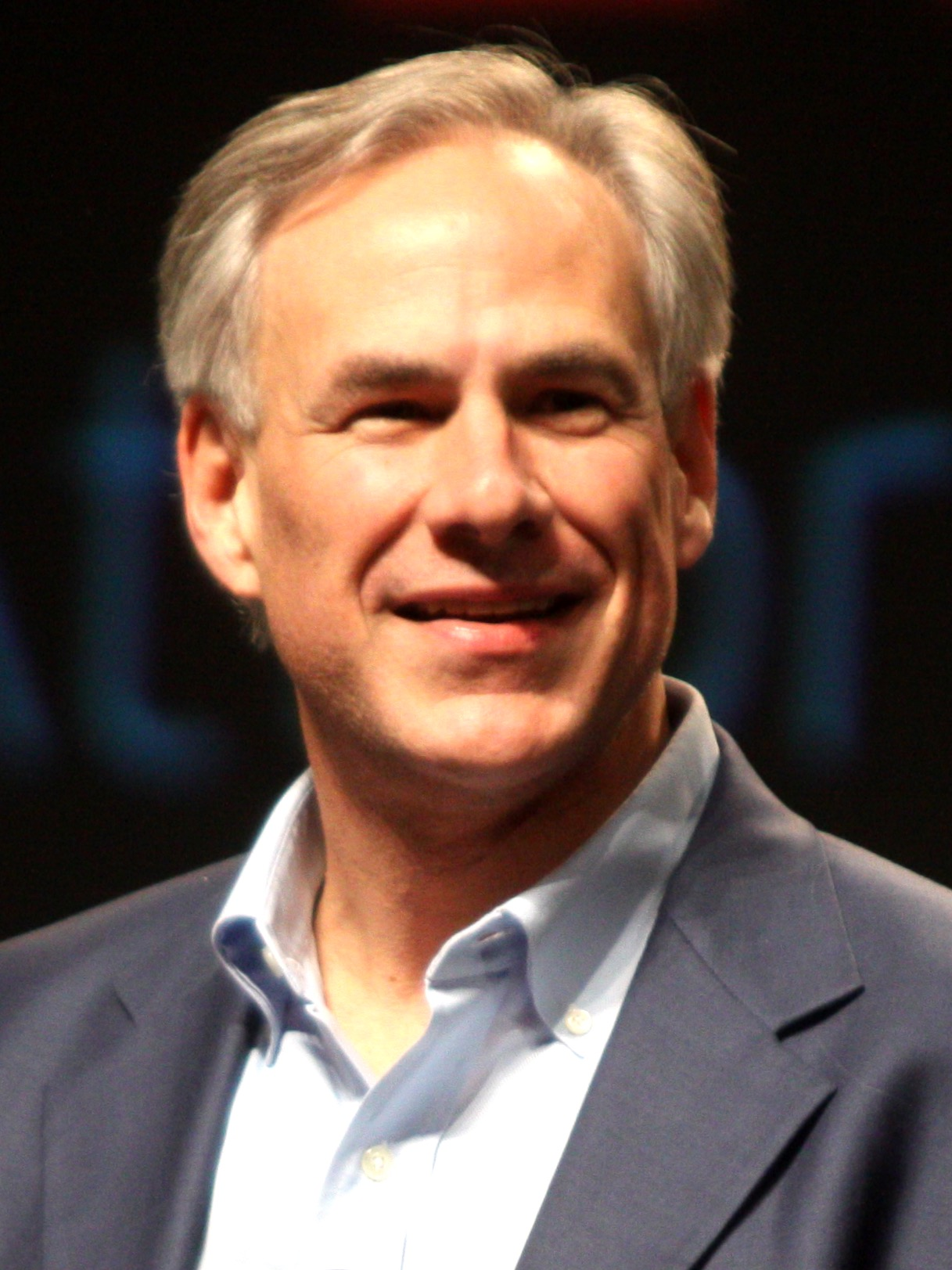
Greg Abbott (R)
Governor

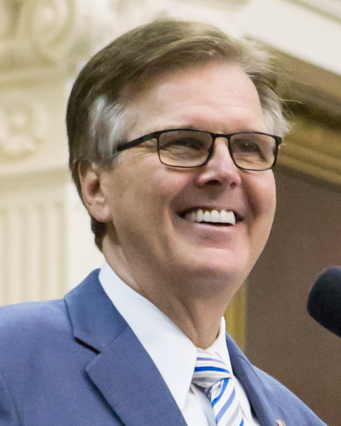
Dan Patrick (R)
Lieutenant Governor

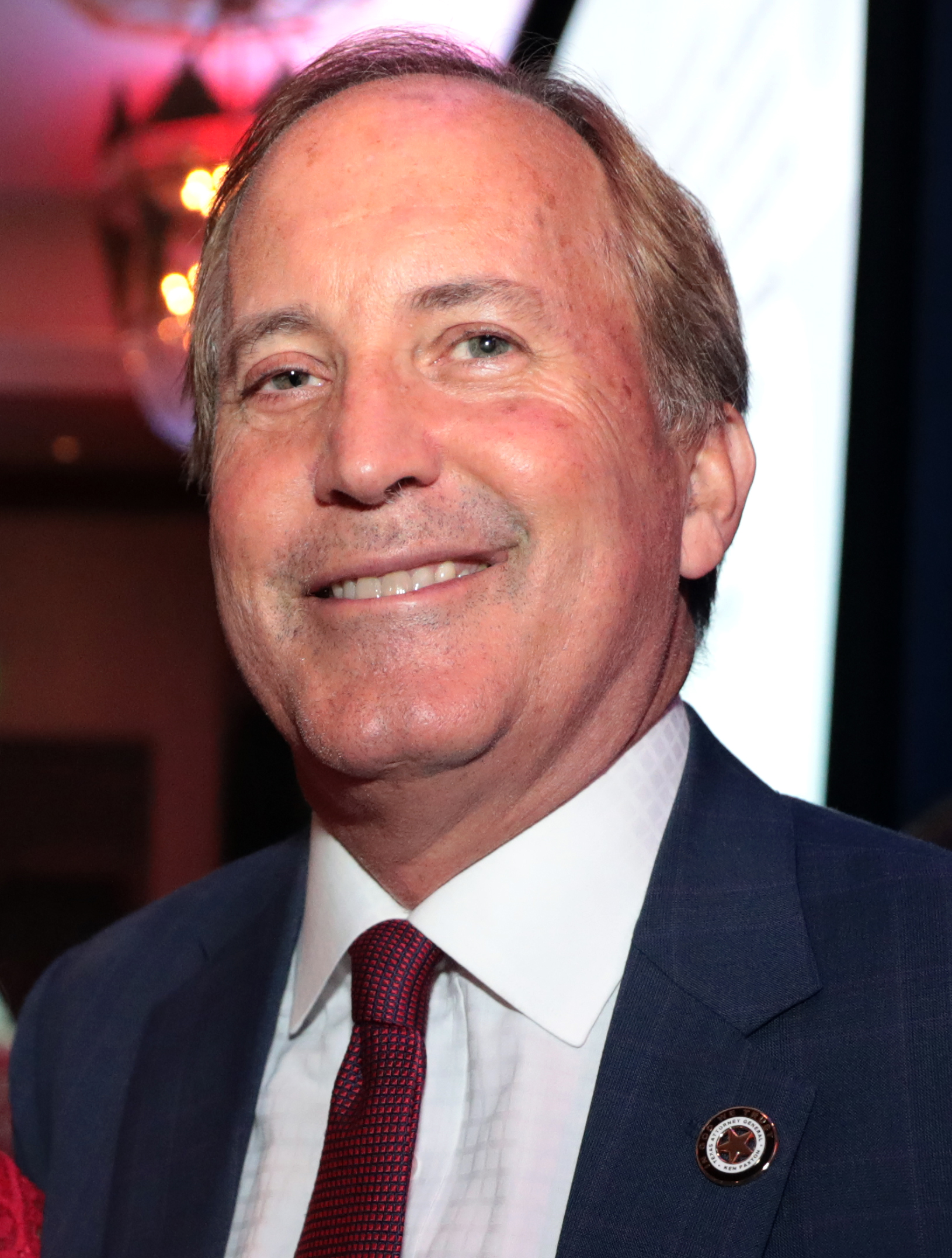
Ken Paxton (R)
Attorney General

Don Huffines (R) (acting)
Comptroller

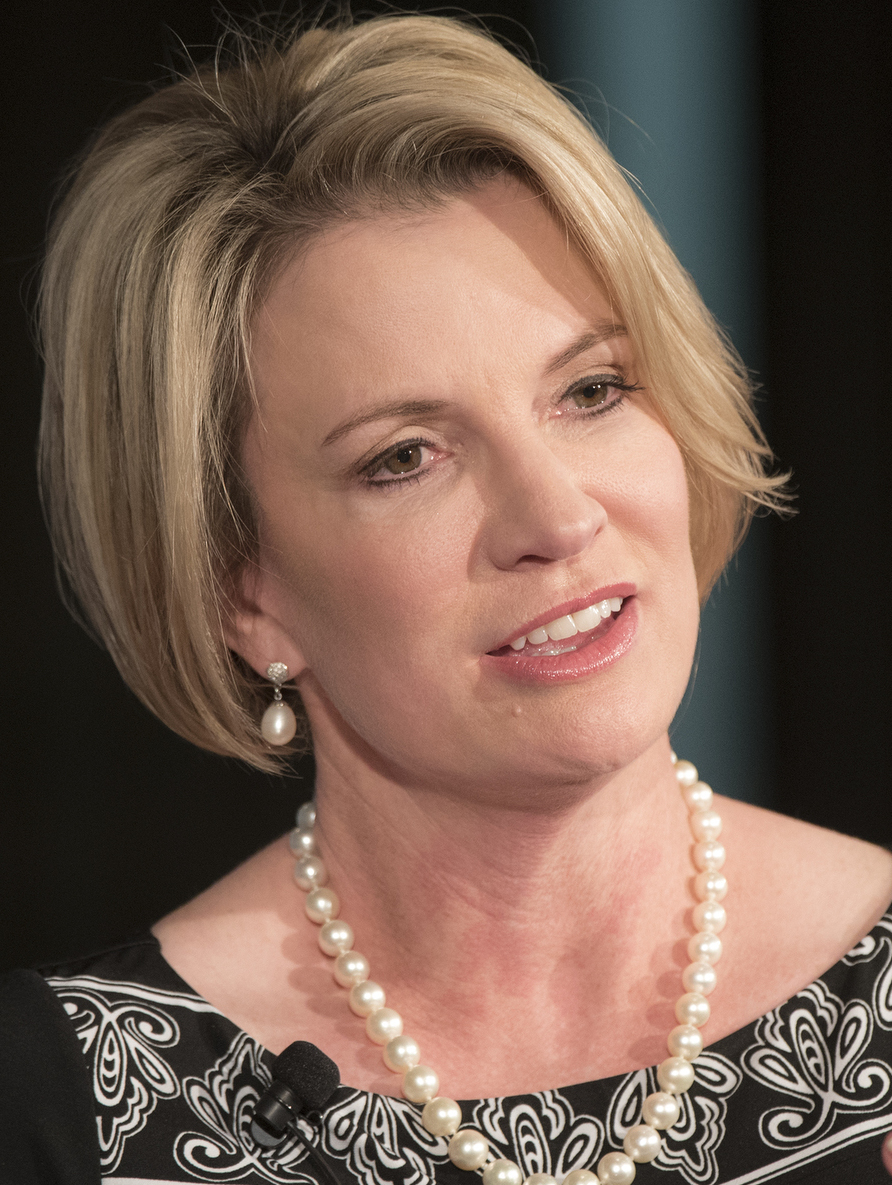
Dawn Buckingham (R)
Land Commissioner

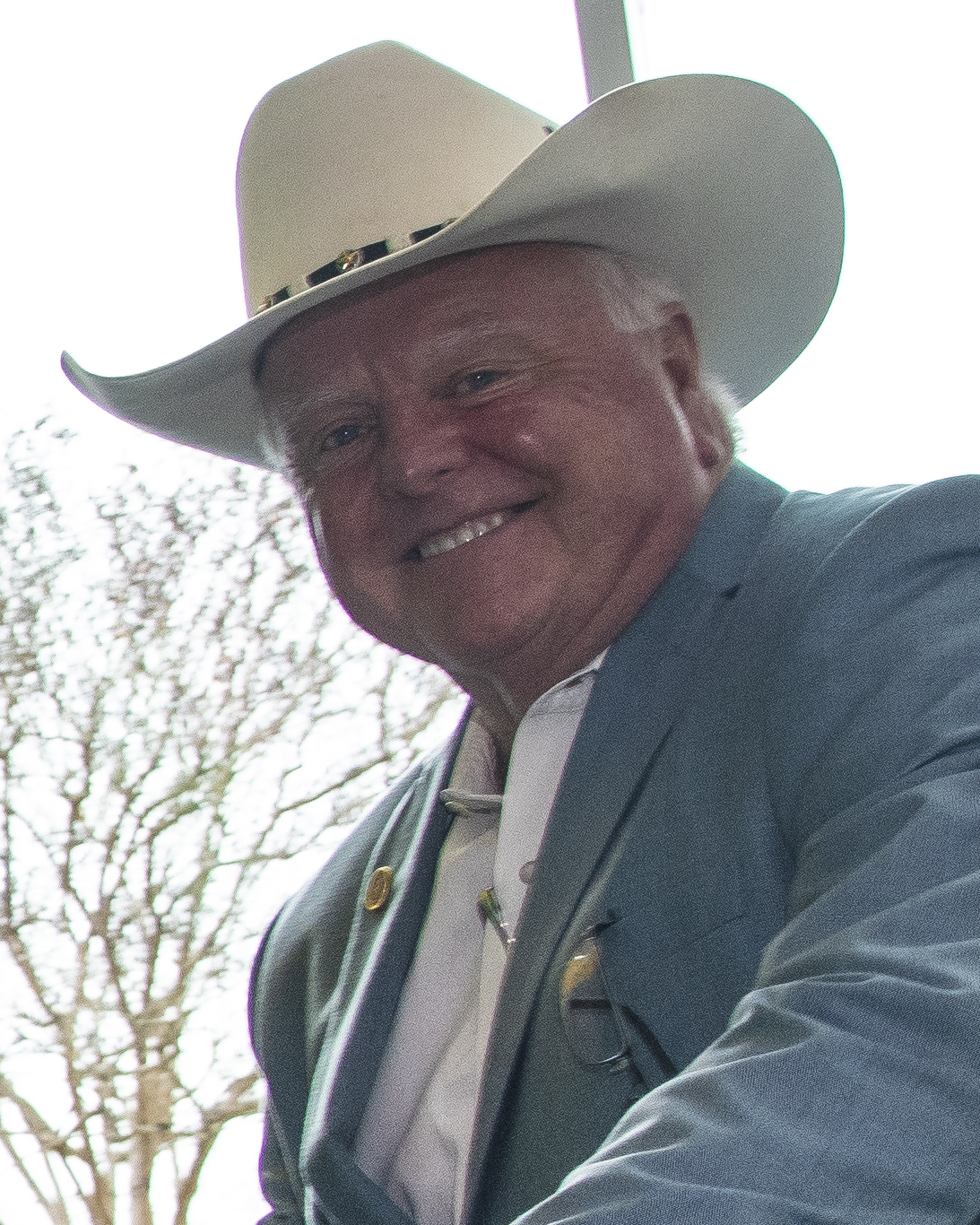
Sid Miller (R)
Agriculture Commissioner

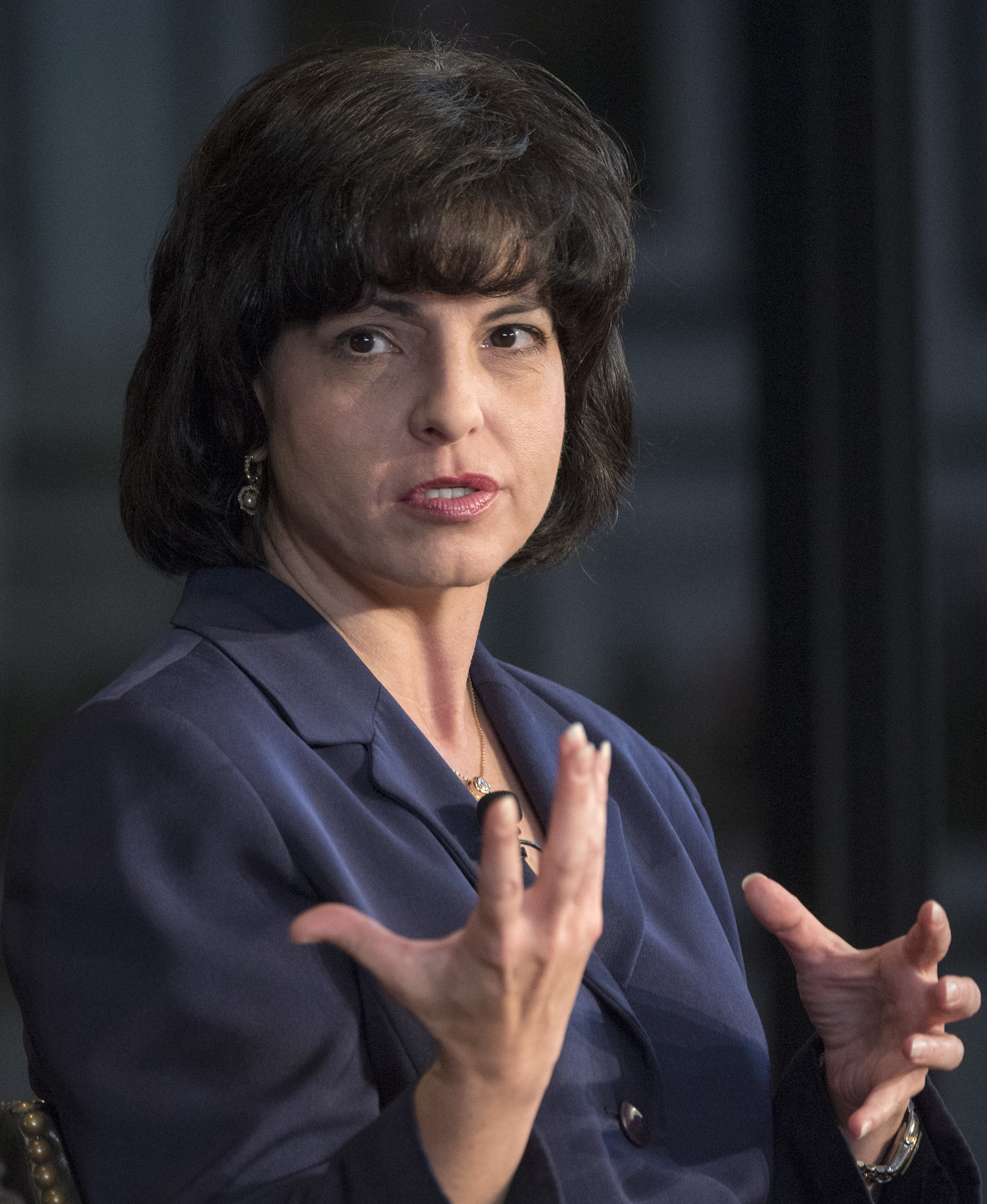
Christi Craddick (R)
Railroad Commissioner

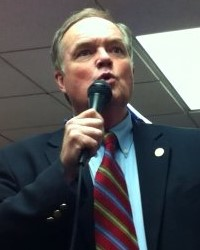
Wayne Christian (R)
Railroad Commissioner

Jim Wright (R)
Railroad Commissioner

The executive department consists of the Governor, Lieutenant Governor, Secretary of State, Comptroller of Public Accounts, Commissioner of the General Land Office, and Attorney General. Texas has a plural executive branch system which limits the power of the Governor. Except for the Secretary of State, all executive officers are elected independently, making them directly answerable to the public, not the Governor. Although elected statewide, the executive department does not include Railroad Commissioners nor the Agriculture Commissioner.

Partly because of many elected officials, the governor's powers are quite limited in comparison to other state governors or the U.S. President. In popular lore and belief the lieutenant governor, who heads the Senate and appoints its committees, has more power than the governor. The governor commands the state militia and can veto bills passed by the Legislature and call special sessions of the Legislature (this power is exclusive to the governor and can be exercised as often as desired). The governor also appoints members of various executive boards and fills judicial vacancies between elections. All members of the executive branch are elected statewide except for the Secretary of State (appointed).

=== State agencies ===
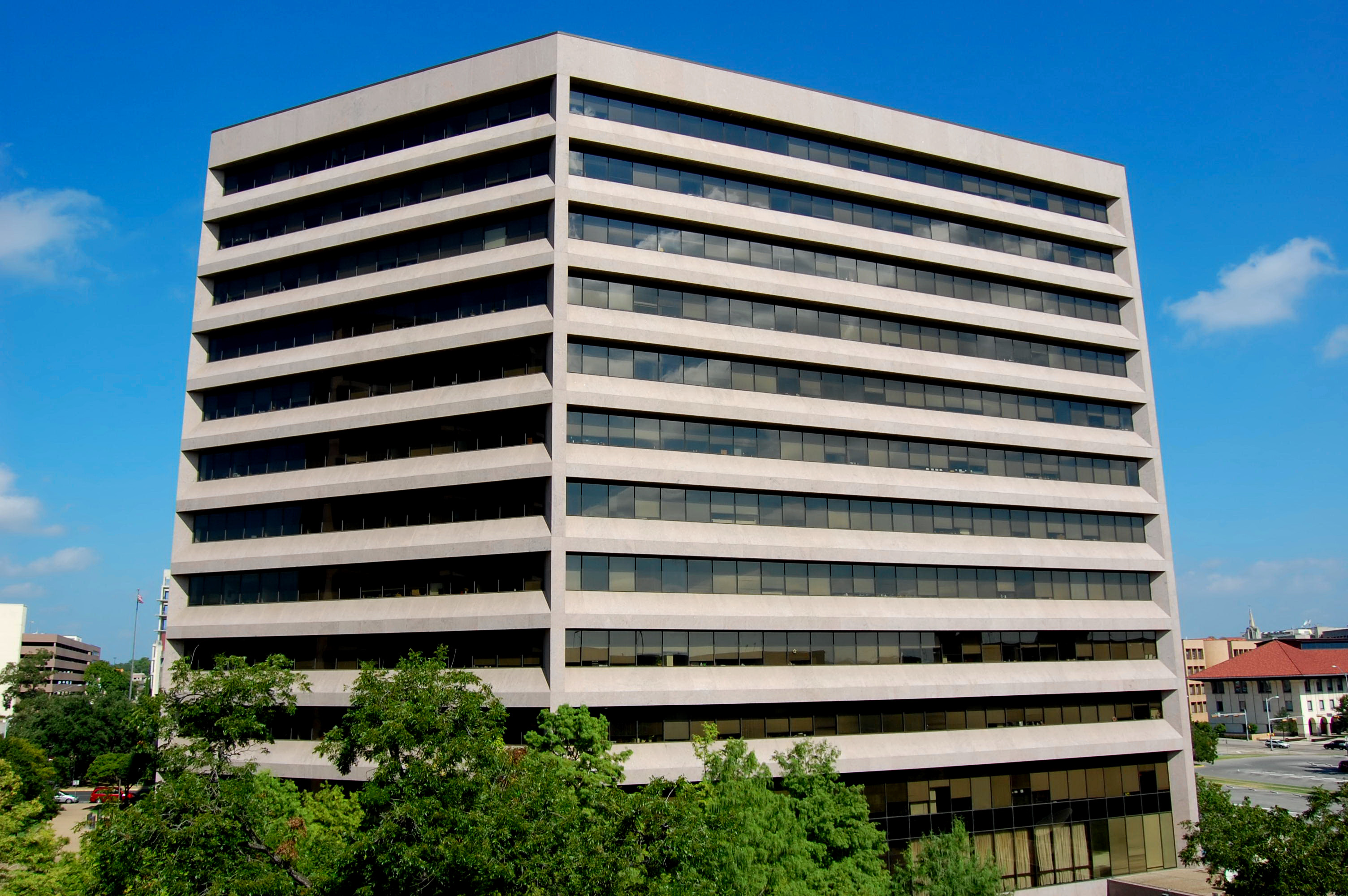
The William B. Travis State Office Building in Downtown Austin

The executive branch also includes several boards and commissions that are constituted through a mixture of elections and gubernatorial appointments confirmed by the Senate. Even with the Governor appointing several members of boards and commissions, the overall effect is a sprawling network of administrative bodies that neither the Governor nor the Legislature are able to coordinate or completely control. The Governor appoints the directors of a handful of state agencies, and the Governor exercises direct authority over these offices. Most state agencies are headquartered in Austin.

The Texas Administrative Code contains the compiled and indexed regulations of Texas state agencies and is published yearly by the Secretary of State. The Texas Register contains proposed rules, notices, executive orders, and other information of general use to the public and is published weekly by the Secretary of State.

== Legislature ==
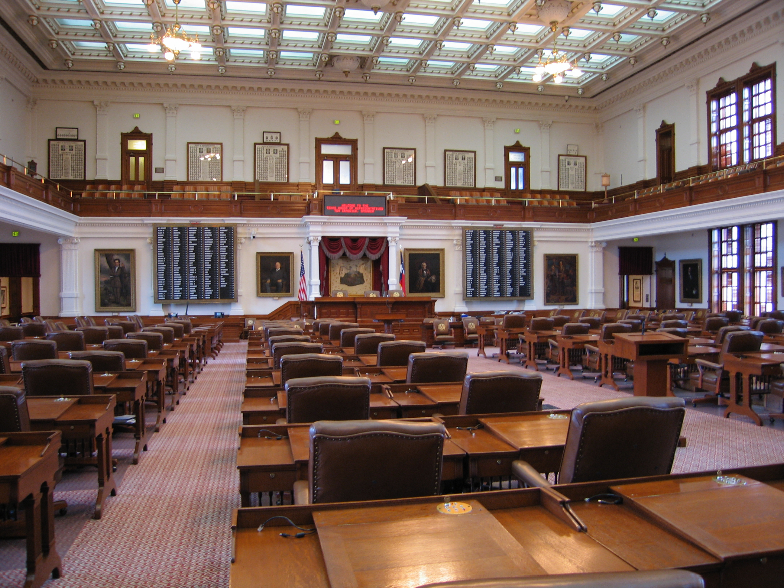
The House of Representatives Chamber in the Texas State Capitol

The Texas Legislature is bicameral, which signifies, having two separate chambers or houses, which in this case, the purpose is to provide checks and balances within the legislature, motivate careful lawmaking, representing different interests. The Texas House of Representatives has 150 members, while the Texas Senate has 31. The Speaker of the House presides over the House, and the Lieutenant Governor presides over the Senate. It is a powerful arm of the Texas government not only because of its power of the purse to control and direct the activities of state government and the strong constitutional connections between it and the Lieutenant Governor, but also due to Texas's plural executive.

The legislature convenes its regular sessions at noon on the second Tuesday in January of odd-numbered years. The maximum duration of a regular session is 140 days. The Governor is given authority under the state constitution to convene the legislature at other times during the biennium. Such sessions are called special sessions and are reserved for legislation that the Governor deems critically important in the conduct of state affairs. Called sessions are limited to a period of 30 days, during which the legislature is permitted to pass laws only on subjects submitted by the governor in calling for the session. Unlike other states, only the Governor may call the Legislature into special sessions (and may do so as often as desired); the Legislature lacks the power to call itself into special session.

Its session laws are published in the official General and Special Laws; most, but not all, of these statutes are codified in the Revised Civil Statutes, Penal Code, and Code of Criminal Procedure (sometimes referred to as the Texas Statutes).

== Judiciary ==
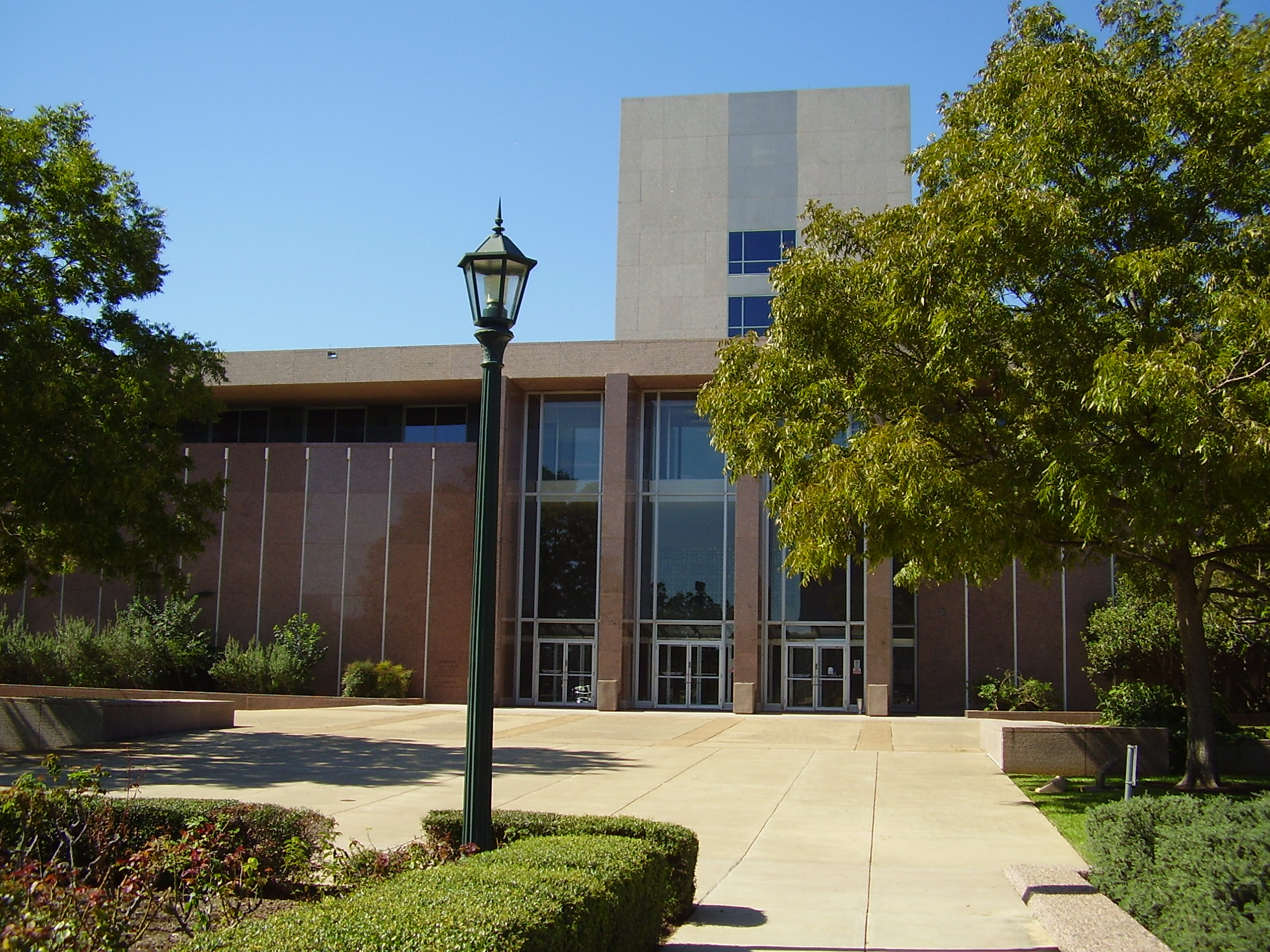
The Supreme Court building

The judicial system of Texas has a reputation as one of the most complex in the United States, with many layers and many overlapping jurisdictions.

Texas has two courts of last resort: the Texas Supreme Court, which hears civil cases, and the Texas Court of Criminal Appeals. Except in the case of some municipal benches, partisan elections choose all of the judges at all levels of the judiciary; the governor fills vacancies by appointment. All members of the Texas Supreme Court and the Texas Court of Criminal Appeals are elected statewide.

The Municipal Courts are the most active courts, with the County and District Courts handling most other cases and often sharing the same buildings. Administration is the responsibility of the Supreme Court, which is aided by the Texas Office of Court Administration, the Texas Judicial Council and the State Bar of Texas (the Texas Bar).

== Local government ==
=== County ===
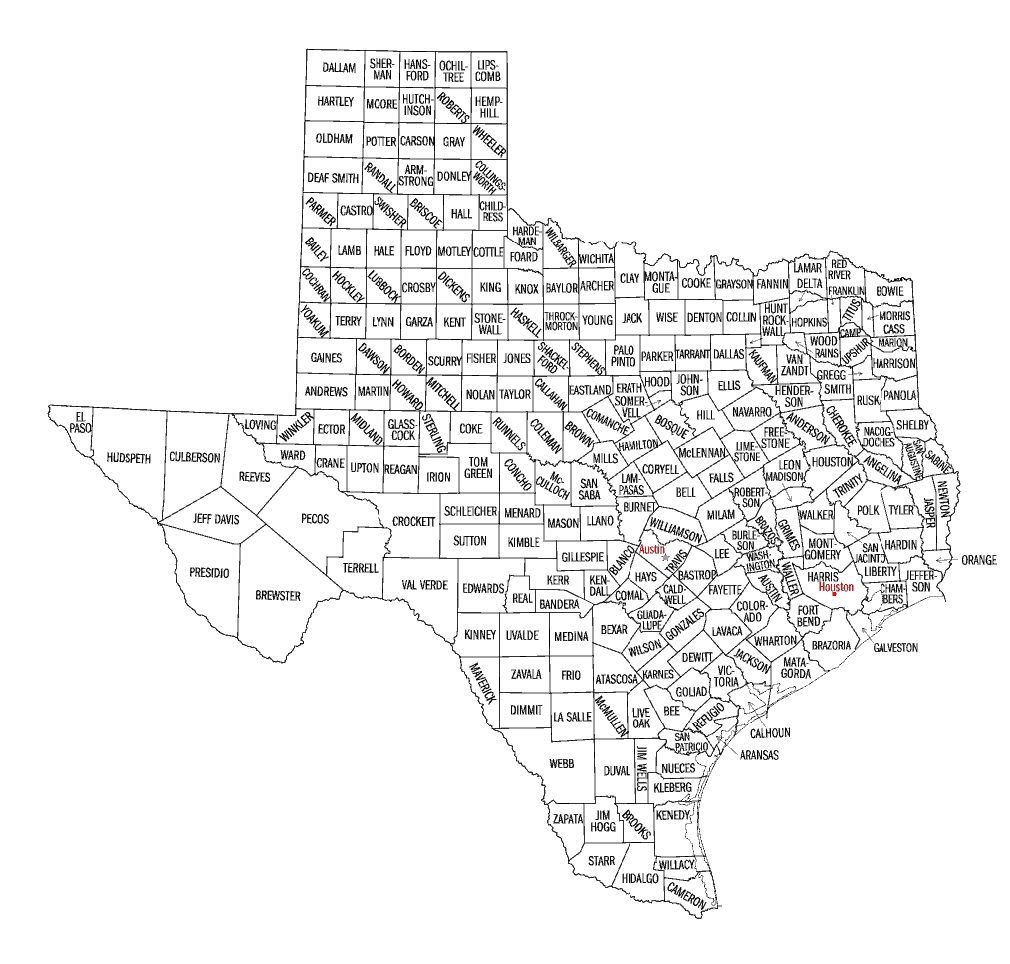
A map of the 254 counties of Texas

Texas has a total of 254 counties, by far the largest number of counties of any state.

Each county is run by a five-member Commissioners' Court consisting of four commissioners elected from single-member districts (called commissioner precincts) and a county judge elected at-large. The county judge does not have authority to veto a decision of the commissioners court; the judge votes along with the commissioners (being the tie-breaker in close calls). In smaller counties, the county judge actually does perform judicial duties, but in larger counties the judge's role is limited to serving on the commissioners court and certifying elections. Certain officials, such as the sheriff and tax collector, are elected separately by the voters, but the commissioners court determines their office budgets, and sets overall county policy. All county elections are partisan. The Commissioners Courts in Texas are served and provided continued education by the County Judges and Commissioners Association events and the official association publication County Progress.

Counties in Texas have limited regulatory (ordinance) authority. Counties in Texas do not have zoning power (except for limited instances). However, counties can collect a small portion of property tax and spend it to provide residents with needed services or to employ the power of eminent domain.

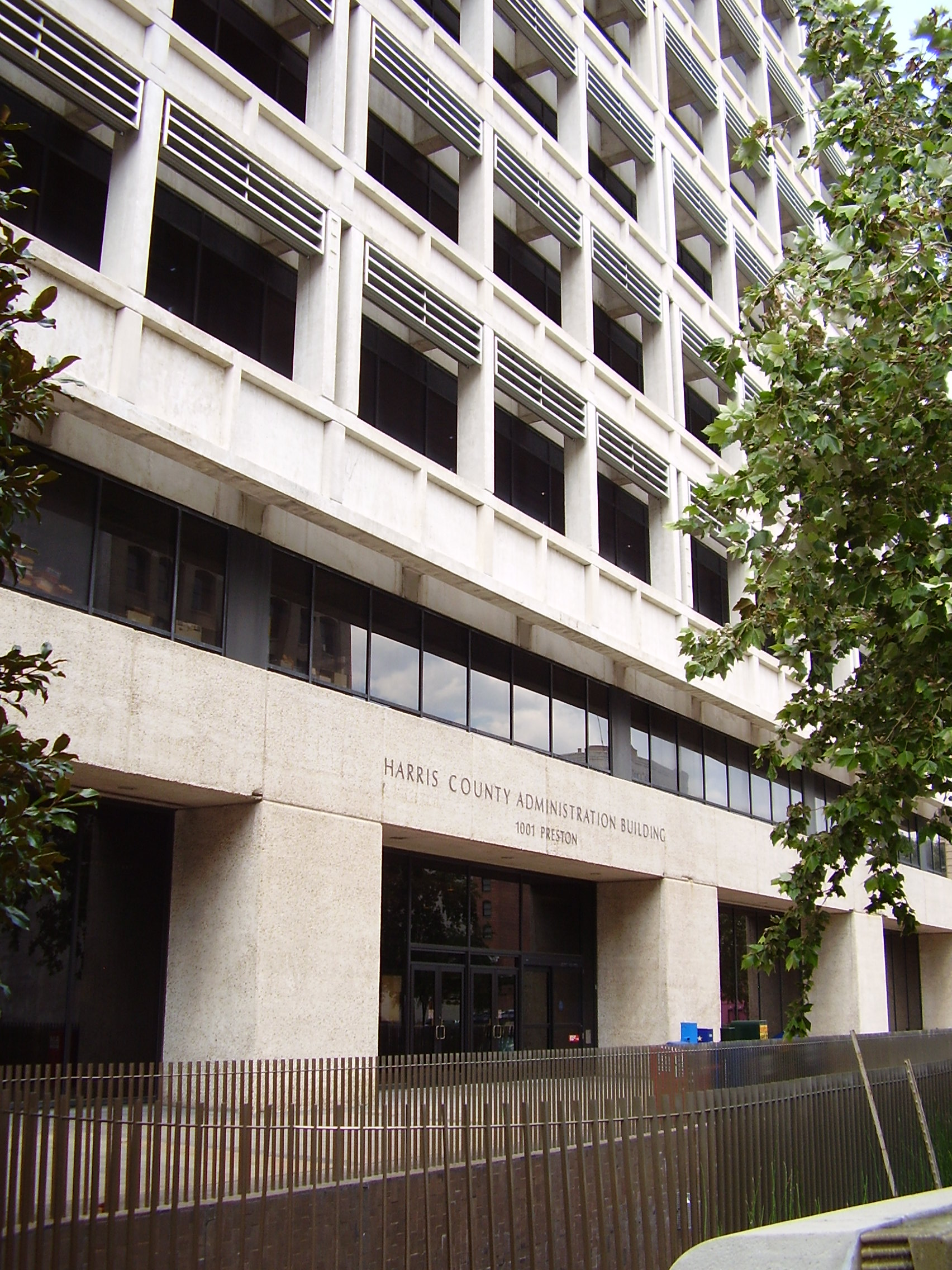
The Harris County Administration Building

Unlike other states, Texas does not allow for consolidated city-county governments. Cities and counties (as well as other political entities) are permitted to enter "interlocal agreements" to share services (for instance, a city and a school district may enter into agreements with the county whereby the county bills for and collects property taxes for the city and school district).

=== Municipal ===
Texas does not have townships; areas within a county are either incorporated or unincorporated. Incorporated areas are part of a city, though the city may contract with the county for needed services. Unincorporated areas are not part of a city; in these areas the county has authority for law enforcement and road maintenance. Their local ordinances, rules, and police regulations are usually codified in a "code of ordinances".

Cities are classified as either "general law" or "home rule". A city may elect home rule status (i.e., draft an independent city charter) once it exceeds 5,000 population and the voters agree to home rule. Otherwise, it is classified as general law and has very limited powers. Larger cities (those exceeding 225,000) have a unique authority: that of "limited annexation", whereby an adjoining area may be annexed for purposes of imposing city ordinances related to safety and building codes. The residents can vote for mayor and council races but cannot vote in bond elections (and, consequently, the city cannot directly collect city sales tax from businesses or city property tax from owners).

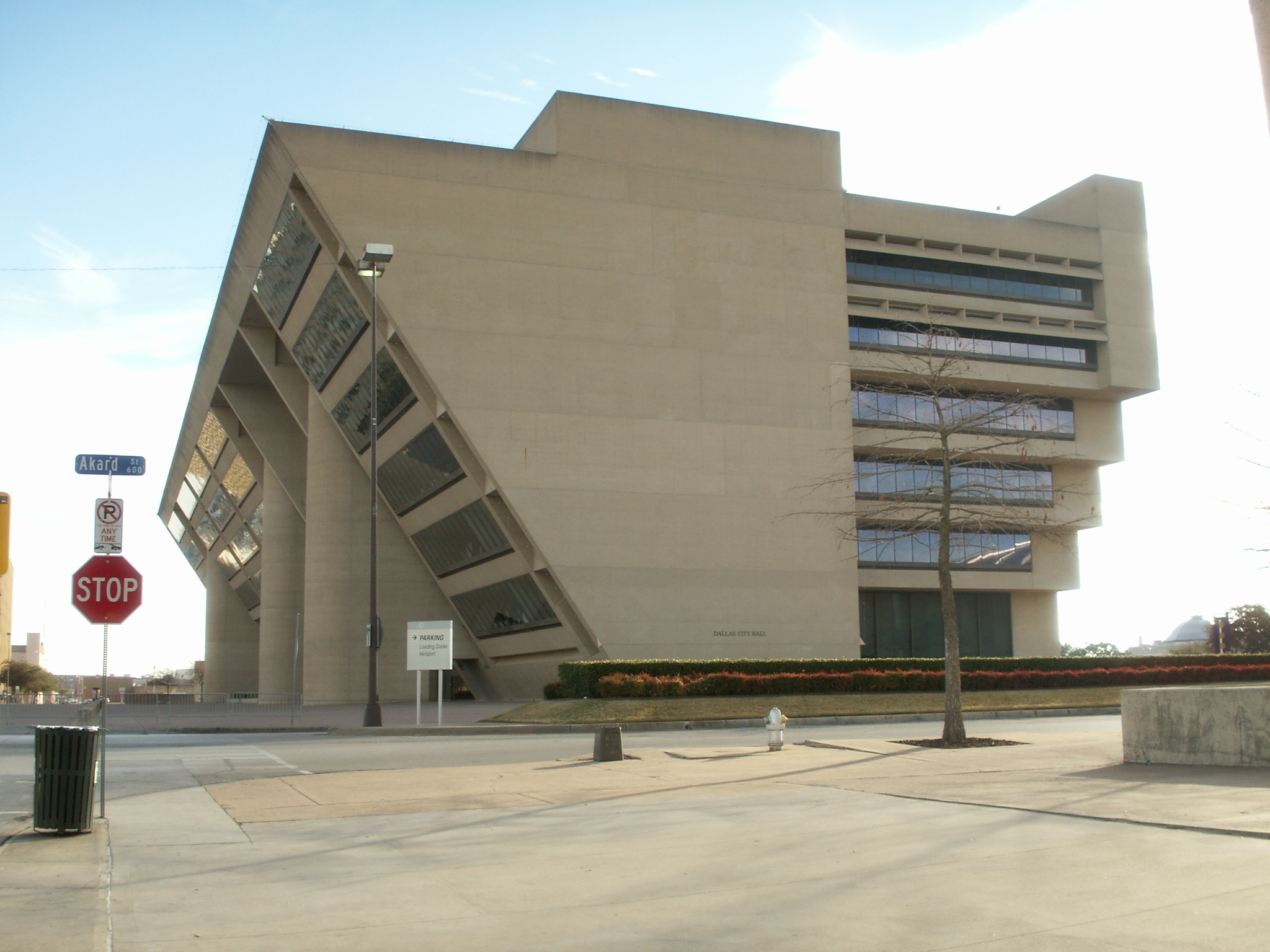
Dallas City Hall

Municipal elections in Texas are nonpartisan in the sense that candidates do not appear on the ballot on party lines, and do not run as party tickets. However, a candidate's party affiliation is usually known or can be discerned with minimal effort (as the candidate most likely has supported other candidates on partisan tickets).

=== Special districts ===
In addition to cities and counties, Texas has numerous special districts. As with municipal elections in Texas, board members or trustees are elected on a nonpartisan basis or may be appointed.

The most common is the independent school district, which (with one exception) has a board of trustees that is independent of any other governing authority. School district boundaries are not generally aligned with city or county boundaries; it is common for a school district to cover one or more counties or for a large city to be served by several school districts. The Texas Education Agency governs public education in Texas.

Other special districts include Groundwater Conservation Districts (regulatory agencies), river authorities, water supply districts (for irrigation or municipal supply), public hospitals, road districts and community colleges.

== See also ==
- Elections in Texas
- Law of Texas
- Politics of Texas
- Texas's congressional delegations
- Women in Texas government
