= Edith Wilmans =

American politician (1882-1966)

- Born: December 21, 1882
- Died: March 21, 1966
- Occupations: Lawyer, politician

Edith Eunice Therrel Wilmans (December 21, 1882 – March 21, 1966) was a Texas lawyer and politician. She was the first woman elected to the Texas State Legislature, in 1922.

== Life and career ==
Born in 1882 Edith Eunice Therrel was a native of Lake Providence, Louisiana, the daughter of Benjamin Franklin and Mary Elizabeth Grier (Therrel). At the age of three, she moved with her family to Dallas, Texas, where she was raised and attended public schools. On Christmas Day 1900 she married Jacob Hall Wilmans, with whom she had three daughters.

Wilmans was quite active in Dallas civic affairs; in 1914 she assisted in the organization of the Dallas Equal Suffrage Association, and later helped create the Dallas Housewives League and the Democratic Women of Dallas County; she also served as president of the Democratic Women's Association of Texas. Known as well for her work in the Woman's Christian Temperance Union and the League of Business and Professional Women, Wilmans was active in her daughters' Parent-Teacher Association, and in her church . She was a member of two anti--communist groups, Minute Women of the U.S.A. and the Paul Revere Club. Interested in learning more about legal matters and improving women's status, Wilmans studied law and was admitted to the bar in 1918.

Wilmans was elected to the Thirty-eighth Texas Legislature in 1922; representing District 50, of Dallas County. She was one of eight women who ran for the legislature that year, but was the only one to win her race. She gained attention by unseating a long-time male incumbent, John E. Davis of Mesquite. She is said to have been assisted by the Ku Klux Klan, who supported her because of her anti-communist position. Her attitude toward the Klan is not known.

She took her seat in 1923, the same year her husband died. While in Austin she supported legislation for the support and care of children, and pressed to establish the Dallas County District Court of Domestic Relations; she also championed a bill which would require compulsory education for all Texas children under the age of fourteen. Only one of her five bills passed; two passed the House but were killed in the Senate, and one made it out of committee but was not considered by the House as a whole. Wilmans served on a number of committees, including Common Carriers; Counties; Education, Oil, Gas and Mining; and Public Health. She was the first woman to preside as Speaker of the House, although it appears to have been an honorary appointment only.

Wilmans served one term; her predecessor unseated her in the following election. She twice ran unsuccessfully for Governor of Texas in 1926 and 1928 but while incumbent governor Miriam A. Ferguson, also a Democrat, was seen as a surrogate for her corrupt husband, Wilmans was too liberal a choice for much of the electorate. She had supported Ferguson in 1924, likely wanting to support another woman as governor. Her campaign platforms included both campaign and prison reform. She also pledged not to marry while in office, saying that a woman should be independent of any man in such a position. In 1925 Wilmans was appointed by Governor Pat M. Neff to the All-Woman Supreme Court alongside Nellie Gray Robertson and Hortense Sparks Ward. She was forced to resign when it was learned that she, along with Robertson, lacked a few months of the required seven years' experience practicing law in the state. These two women were replaced by appointees Ruth Virginia Brazzil and Hattie Leah Henenberg.

Wilmans was endorsed by the National Woman's Party as a candidate for Vice-President of the United States in the 1928 presidential election, but refused to run. She married again in 1929; her new husband was Henry A. Born of Chicago. The abusive marriage ended in divorce, and she returned to Dallas, resuming a practice.

In 1935 Wilmans ran again for the legislature and was defeated; that year she bought a farm near Vineyard, in Jack County. She challenged her sister in another election for her old seat, again losing. Moving to the farm in Vineyard to raise goats and cattle, she ran in 1948 and 1951, in a special election, for the Thirteenth District seat in the United States Congress, but was defeated both times. She continued the practice of law until her retirement in 1958. In that year she broke her hip and returned to Dallas to live with her eldest daughter. She died in Dallas eight years later. She was buried in Hillcrest Memorial Park in the city. Her papers are held by the Texas State Archive.

== See also ==
- Margie Neal, first woman elected to the Texas State Senate
