= Eugene A. Cook =

American judge (1938–2020)

Justice of the Supreme Court of Texas, Place 3
- In office September 1, 1988 – December 31, 1992
- Appointed by: Bill Clements
- Preceded by: James P. Wallace
- Succeeded by: Rose Spector

Personal details
- Born: Eugene Augustus Cook III; May 2, 1938 Houston, Texas
- Died: August 23, 2020 (aged 82)
- Party: Republican
- Spouse: Sondra Attaway
- Children: 1 son, 1 daughter
- Education: University of Houston (B.A., J.D.); University of Virginia (LL.M)

Eugene Augustus Cook III (May 2, 1938 – August 23, 2020) was a justice of the Supreme Court of Texas from September 1, 1988 to December 31, 1992.

== Early life, education, and career ==
Born in Houston, Texas to Eugene A. Cook Jr. and Estelle Mary Cook, he attended Milby High School, and received a B.A. in accounting from the University of Houston in 1961, followed by a J.D. from the University of Houston Law Center in 1966. He married Sondra Attaway in 1968, and they had two children. Following his admission to the bar, he joined the firm of Butler and Binion, of which he became a partner from 1973 until he left in 1985 to start his own firm, Cook, Davis & McFall.

== Judicial service ==
On August 19, 1988, Governor Bill Clements appointed Cook to a seat on the Texas Supreme Court. He was sworn in on September 1, 1988, and was elected to a full term on the Court in November.

While serving on the court, Cook chaired the Committee on Professionalism, which drafted The Texas Lawyer's Creed – A Mandate for Professionalism, a code of professionalism for the state, of which Cook "was the principal architect". Cook was named a Distinguished Alumnus of the Houston Law Center in 1990, and received an LL.M. from the University of Virginia School of Law in 1992. He also served as the president of the Houston Bar Association from 1989 to 1990, and was awarded the Most Outstanding Attorney award from the State Bar of Texas in 1989. In 1992, he received the Lewis F. Powell Jr. Award for exemplary service to the legal profession from the American Inns of Court.

== Post-judicial service ==
Cook ran for reelection to the court in 1992, but was defeated by Rose Spector, who became the first woman elected to the court. Cook thereafter returned to Houston to serve as senior partner and head of the appellate group at Bracewell & Giuliani. Cook retired from that position in 2002. On November 12, 2011, Cook was honored by the Freedoms Foundation for his "outstanding work in promoting good citizenship principles".

== Electoral history ==
1988 General Election: Supreme Court of Texas, Place 3
Party	Candidate	Votes	%
Republican	Eugene Cook	2,537,129	51.7
Democratic	Karl Bayer	2,368,634	48.3

1992 General Election: Supreme Court of Texas, Place 3
Party	Candidate	Votes	%
Democratic	Rose Spector	2,948,377	52.2
Republican	Eugene Cook	2,697,017	47.8

Political offices
Preceded by James P. Wallace	Justice of the Texas Supreme Court; 1988–1992	Succeeded by Rose Spector
