= Ruth Virginia Brazzil =

American judge (1889–1976)

Ruth Virginia Brazzil, sometimes known as Ruth Brazzil Roome (September 12, 1889 – May 22, 1976) was a Texas lawyer and jurist. She was a member of the All-Woman Supreme Court of 1925.

== Life and career ==
Brazzil was the eldest child of William N. and Winnie Shelman Brazzil, and was a native of Tyler, Texas. At least part of her early education was spent in Wharton, Texas; she then attended the University of Texas as a special student, studying law. Admitted to the Texas Bar in 1912, she then began work in Austin for a member of the state legislature. She had a business interest in real estate as well, and worked for the Wharton County Abstract Company in Wharton while in her twenties. She also became assistant general manager and assistant treasurer of Galveston's American National Life Insurance Company. Unlike the other two women with whom she would serve on the court, Brazzil is said to have been an opponent of women's suffrage and participation in politics.

Brazzil was the last of three members appointed to the special all-female session of the Supreme Court of Texas by Governor of Texas Pat M. Neff in 1925; she was nominated only one day before the court was required to begin session. Unlike Edith Wilmans and Nellie Gray Robertson, both of whom had been previously appointed and required to step aside, she had the required seven years' experience practicing law in the state, and she had a familiarity with property law, which would be useful for the case at hand, as it involved property rights. It also involved the Woodmen of the World, which meant that her work in the insurance industry would also be of some assistance. She sat as an associate justice of the court alongside Hattie Leah Henenberg; Hortense Sparks Ward was acting chief justice. The court met twice before delivering its judgement in the case and disbanding in May 1925.

Brazzil left Galveston in the 1920s and moved to Wharton County, where she married rice farmer Roy Roome in December 1927. She divorced him within two weeks, but kept her married name. She appears to have given up the practice of law at this time, moving to the Texas Hill Country sometime late in the 1920s or early in the 1930s. For a time she lived in Bandera, where she served as postmistress, and Center Point. She collaborated with friends on a number of writing projects, and engaged in travel and genealogical research.

Brazzil moved to Kerrville on her retirement in 1966 and lived there until her death a decade later. She was buried in the town's Garden of Memories Perpetual Care Cemetery.

A Texas Historical Marker in Wharton, describing the history of the Wharton County Abstract Company, notes Brazzil's participation in the All-Woman Supreme Court.
