= Harriet O'Neill =

American judge (born 1957)

Harriet Smith O'Neill

Justice of the Texas Supreme Court
- In office January 1, 1999 – June 20, 2010
- Preceded by: Rose Spector
- Succeeded by: Debra Lehrmann

Judge of the Fourteenth Court of Appeals of Texas
- In office 1995–1998
- Appointed by: George W. Bush

Judge of the Texas 152 District Court
- In office 1993–1995

Personal details
- Born: April 20, 1957 (age 69)
- Party: Republican
- Education: Converse College; University of South Carolina
- Occupation: Attorney; Judge

Harriet Smith O'Neill (born April 20, 1957) is a retired justice of the Supreme Court of Texas. A Republican, O'Neill represented Place 3 of the nine positions on the court. O'Neill's term was to expire on December 31, 2010, and she declined to seek re-election to a third full six-year term. In the April 13 runoff election, Judge Debra Lehrmann, a family court judge from Fort Worth, won the Republican primary to succeed O'Neill. O'Neill subsequently decided to leave the court early and vacated the seat on June 20, 2010. Lehrmann was appointed by Governor Rick Perry to fill out O'Neill's term.

== Education and legal career ==
O'Neill completed her undergraduate studies at Converse College and she received her J.D. from the University of South Carolina School of Law in 1982. Prior to joining the bench, O'Neill was in private practice in Houston. She practiced law with the firms of Porter & Clements, Morris & Campbell, and then opened her own practice. Throughout those ten years, O'Neill practiced mostly complex business and commercial litigation.

== Judicial career ==
O'Neill was first elected to the Texas Supreme Court in 1998. Previously, O'Neill had been a justice of the Fourteenth Court of Appeals of Texas since 1995, when then-Governor George W. Bush appointed her. Prior to that, O'Neill had been a trial judge for the 152nd District Court, located in Houston, to which she was elected in 1992.

Legal offices
Preceded by Rose Spector	Justice of the Supreme Court of Texas, Place 3; 1999–2010	Succeeded by Debra Lehrmann
