= James G. Denton =

American judge (1917–1982)

James Gray Denton (May 27, 1917 – June 10, 1982) was a justice of the Supreme Court of Texas from January 1, 1971 to June 10, 1982, died in office.

Political offices
Preceded by Robert W. Hamilton	Justice of the Texas Supreme Court; 1971–1982	Succeeded by Ruby Kless Sondock
