= Hattie Leah Henenberg =

American judge (1893–1974)

Hattie Leah Henenberg (February 16, 1893 – November 28, 1974) was a lawyer from Texas. She was a member of the All-Woman Supreme Court convened in 1925, the first all-female high court in the United States.

== Life and career ==
Henenberg was born in Ennis, Texas to a Hungarian-born mother and an American-born father. With her parents, Samuel and Rosa (née Trebitsch), and six siblings she moved to Dallas in 1904, where the family helped her ailing grandfather Lazar in the running of his pawn shop; there she attended the public schools. She found work as a stenographer while taking night classes at the Dallas School of Law, an affiliate of Southern Methodist University. She obtained her law license in 1916, and would go on to practice law in Dallas for fifty years.

Henenberg was always interested in social causes. During World War I she served on the Legal Advisory Board helping men complete draft registration forms. She founded the Free Legal Aid Bureau of the Dallas Bar Association in 1924. She was also interested in the welfare of children, serving on the child welfare committee of the State Bar of Texas and creating a toy-lending library for poor youth. She also served in varying capacities with a number of civic organizations, such as Zonta International, for which she served as Dallas president; she was also a member of the Order of Eastern Star, Business and Professional Women's Club, and Temple Emanu-El of Dallas.

In 1924, a case involving the Woodmen of the World came before the Supreme Court of Texas, all of whose members were affiliated with the organization. To hear the case Governor of Texas Pat M. Neff hit upon the solution of an all-female court, as women were not eligible for membership in the Woodmen and so would not have a conflict of interest. Unlike Edith Wilmans and Nellie Gray Robertson, both of whom had been previously appointed and required to step aside, Henenberg had the required seven years' experience practicing law in the state She was one of two associate justices ultimately chosen, along with Ruth Virginia Brazzil; Hortense Sparks Ward was chosen special chief justice. The court served for five months and met twice before disbanding.

Following her judicial service, in 1928 Henenberg became a member of the executive committee of the state Democratic Party. She took active leadership positions, both at the state and regional levels, in the 1932 presidential campaign of Franklin D. Roosevelt and John Nance Garner, gaining much support from members of Business and Professional Women's Clubs nationwide. From 1929 to 1931 she served as an assistant attorney general for the state of Texas; in 1934 she was made a special assistant to the Attorney General of the United States. She was a delegate to the 1932 Democratic National Convention. From 1941 to 1947 she was an assistant district attorney for Dallas County, specializing in domestic-relations matters; during her time in the position she created a unit especially to jail fathers who were delinquent in paying child support. Later in her life Henenberg discontinued her activism so that she could care for her sister. She died in Dallas in 1974 and was buried in Restland Memorial Park.

Henenberg remained observant of Jewish practice for much of her life; a member of the Dallas Reform synagogue Temple Emanu-El, she refused to marry a non-Jew, and did not eat pork. She was listed in Who's Who in Jewry for 1928.

== See also ==
- List of Jewish American jurists
