= Debra Lehrmann =

American judge (born 1956)

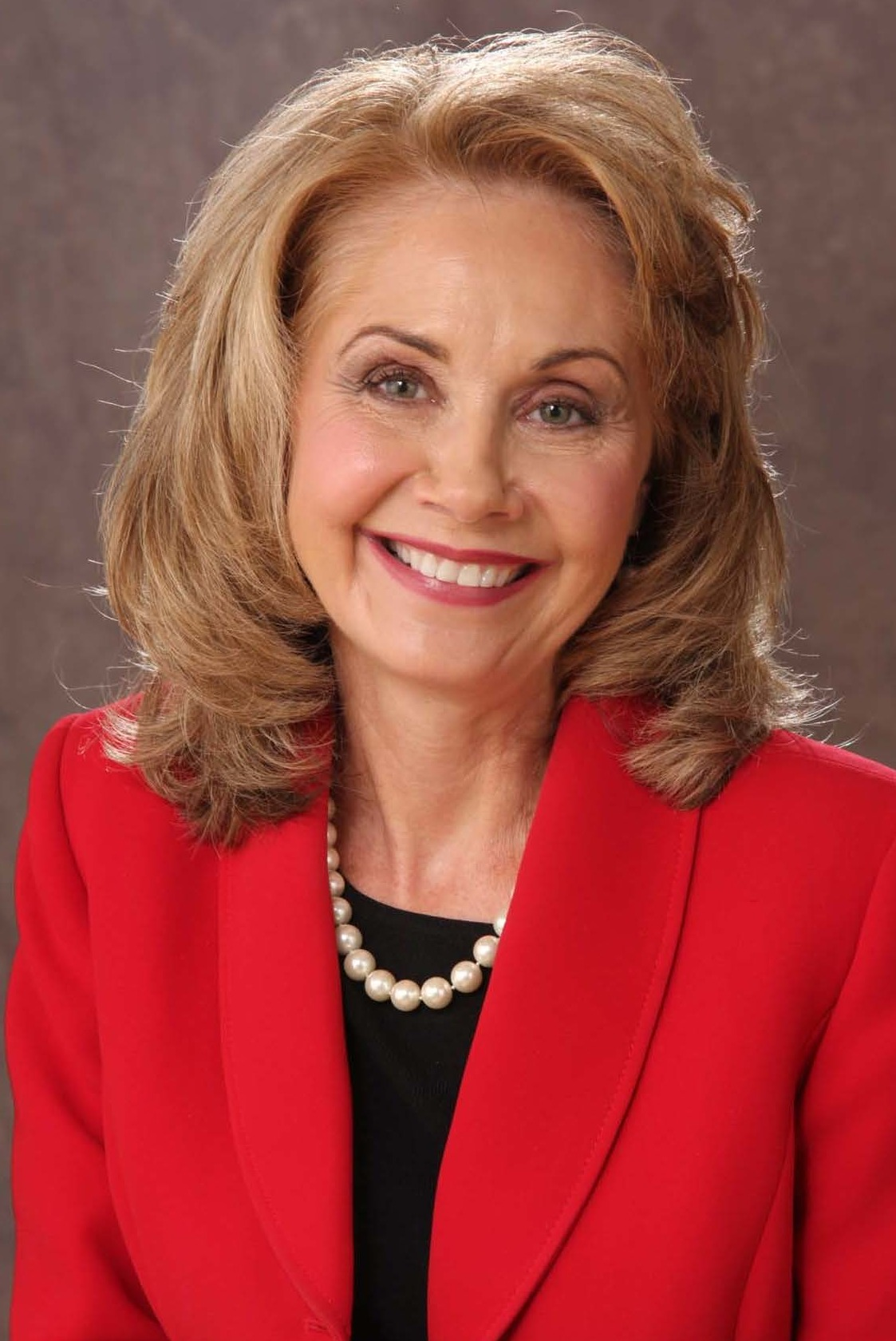
- Lehrmann in 2011

Justice of the Supreme Court of Texas
- Incumbent
- Assumed office June 21, 2010
- Appointed by: Rick Perry
- Preceded by: Harriet O'Neill

Personal details
- Born: Debra Ann Herman; November 16, 1956 (age 69) Harris County, Texas, U.S.
- Party: Republican
- Spouse: Greg Lehrmann
- Children: 2
- Education: University of Texas, Austin (BA, JD)
- Website: Office website Campaign website

Debra Ann H. Lehrmann (born November 16, 1956) is a justice of the Texas Supreme Court. She is a former judge of the 360th Judicial District Court in Fort Worth.

== Background ==
Debra Lehrmann (née Herman) is a native of Harris County and was raised in Baytown, Texas. An active member of the Family Law Section of the American Bar Association (ABA), she served as chair of the Section in 2010-2011 and as the Judicial Liaison to the Judicial Division of the ABA. She previously served on the Executive Committee of the Section Officers Conference of the ABA. Lehrmann served on the drafting committee for the ABA Standards of Practice for Lawyers Representing a Child in Abuse and Neglect Cases. She also serves as a representative of the State of Texas on the Uniform Law Commission, which drafts uniform laws for states to consider enacting.

On May 21, 2020, she disclosed via Twitter that she and her husband tested positive for COVID-19. On June 17, 2020 she disclosed via Twitter that she and her husband had both recovered, now tested negative, and would be donating their plasma.

== Political life ==
Lehrmann won renomination to a second term in the Republican primary on March 1, 2016.

With Republican primary turnout reaching a record level, Lehrmann won over contender Massengale by nearly 100,000 votes, winning 1,130,137 (52.2%) to 1,034,609 (47.8%).

Legal offices
Preceded by Harriet O'Neill	Justice of the Texas Supreme Court; 2010–present	Incumbent
