= Ruby Kless Sondock =

American judge (1926–2026)

Associate Justice of the Supreme Court of Texas
- In office June 25, 1982 – December 31, 1982
- Appointed by: Bill Clements
- Preceded by: James G. Denton
- Succeeded by: William W. Kilgarlin

Personal details
- Born: April 26, 1926 Houston, Texas, U.S.
- Died: July 21, 2026 (aged 100)
- Party: Democratic
- Education: Cottey College (A.A.); University of Houston (B.A., LL.B.)

Ruby Kless Sondock (April 26, 1926 – July 21, 2026) was an American judge who was an Associate Justice of the Texas Supreme Court. She was the first woman to serve on the Texas Supreme Court.

== Life and career ==
Sondock initially attended the University of Houston Law Center in order to become a legal secretary, but she was admitted to the state bar a year before her graduation as valedictorian of her class (1962). Sondock was appointed to the Harris County Domestic Relations Court No. 5 in 1973 and to the 234th District Court in 1977. Sondock was the first woman to be appointed a State District Judge in Harris County, Texas.

She was appointed to the Texas Supreme Court following the death of Associate Justice James G. Denton on June 10, 1982. Sondock served from June 25 to December 31 of that year, completing Denton's term. Sondock declined to seek election to the Supreme Court and instead ran successfully for reelection to her District Court seat the following year. Sondock was the court's first female justice, with the exception of a special all-woman court convened in 1925 to hear a single case. Sondock formed part of the majority of the Texas Supreme Court in the landmark case of Helicopteros Nacionales de Colombia, S. A. v. Hall.

A distinguished legal mind, Sondock has received a number of accolades, including an annual lecture series on legal ethics. Former speakers at the Sondock Lecture on Legal Ethics at the University of Houston Law Center include U.S. Senator Orrin Hatch and Helen Thomas. On November 11, 2015, the Litigation Section of the State Bar of Texas inducted Sondock as a "Texas Legal Legend."

Sondock died on July 21, 2026, at the age of 100.

== See also ==
- List of female state supreme court justices

Legal offices
Preceded by James G. Denton	Justice of the Supreme Court of Texas; 1982	Succeeded by William W. Kilgarlin
