= Hortense Sparks Ward =

American judge (1872–1944)

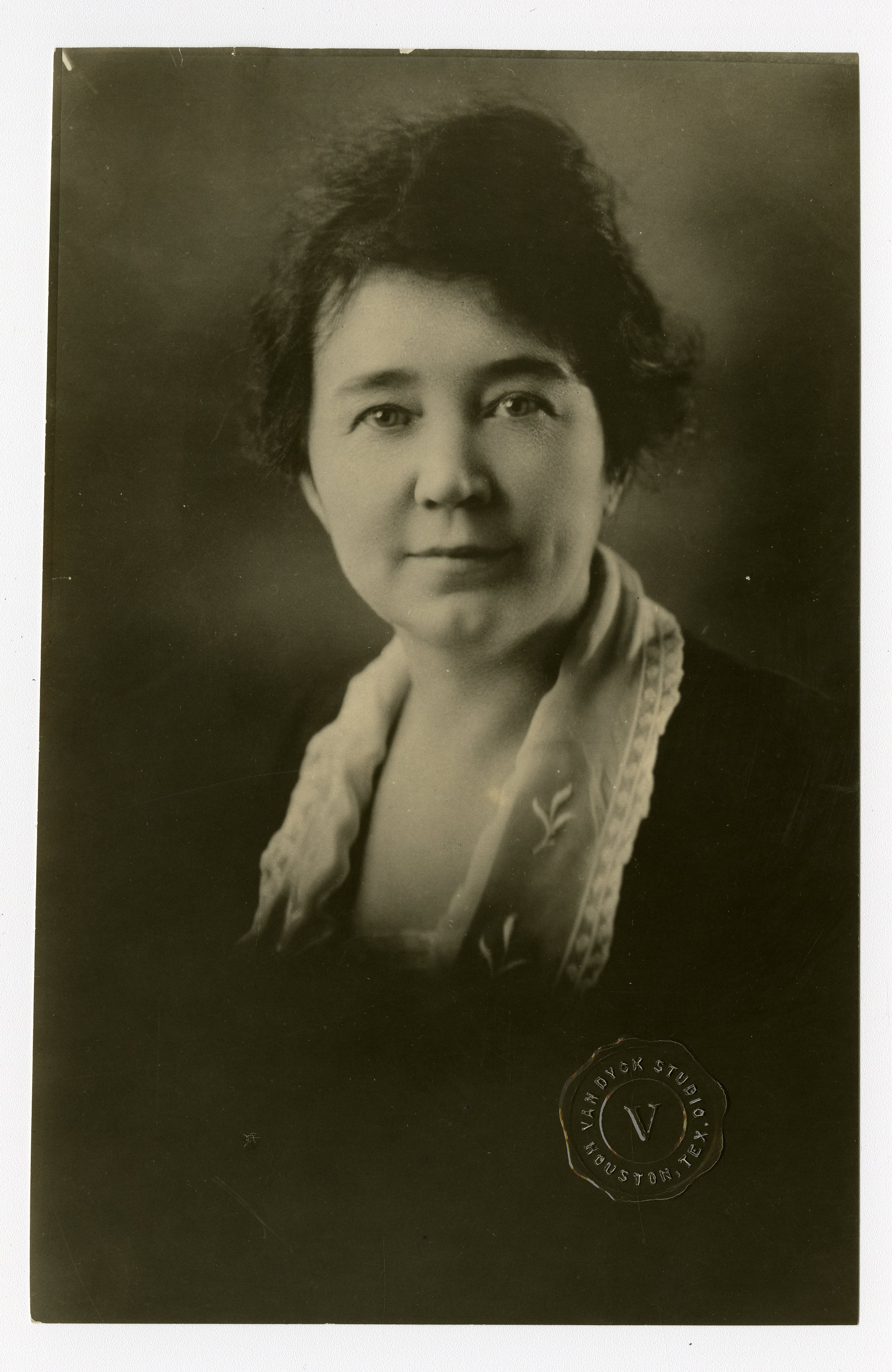
- Born: Hortense Sparks; July 21, 1872; Matagorda County, Texas
- Died: December 5, 1944 (aged 72); Houston, Texas
- Occupations: Attorney, Judge, Suffragist
- Known for: first Texas woman to practice before the United States Supreme Court.
- Spouses: Albert Malsch (m. 1891; div. 1906) William Henry Ward (m. 1908)

Hortense Sparks Ward (July 21, 1872 – December 5, 1944) was a pioneering Texas lawyer and women's rights activist.

== Biography ==
Born Hortense Sparks in Matagorda County, Texas, Ward grew up in Edna, Texas and attended Nazareth Academy, a convent school. Ward taught school in Edna starting in 1890 and married her first husband Albert Malsch a year later. The family moved to Houston in 1903, where Ward worked as a court reporter. Hortense and Albert divorced in 1906 and she married her second husband, attorney William Henry Ward two years later.

Ward became the first woman to pass the Texas State Bar Exam in 1910 and soon after began practicing law with her husband. Ward chose to work behind the scenes rather than in court out of fear that all-male juries might react poorly to a female lawyer. In 1915, Ward became the first Texas woman to practice before the United States Supreme Court. Ward was also a founder of the Houston Heights Woman's Club, which is still in existence today. Every year the club gives an award honoring her to a woman who is a law student that exemplifies the spirit of public service exhibited by Ward.

Ward was a prominent campaigner for women's suffrage and women's rights. She wrote pamphlets and newspaper articles and personally exhorted elected officials to vote for bills promoting women's legal rights. Ward led a successful 1918 campaign to allow women the right to vote in Texas primary elections and, on June 27 of that year, she became the first woman in Harris County, Texas to register to vote.

Ward was appointed Special Chief Justice of a special all-female Texas Supreme Court in 1925. All of the court's male justices recused themselves from a case involving the Woodmen of the World fraternal organization, and, since nearly every member of the Texas Bar was a member of that organization and received insurance benefits from it, no male judges or attorneys could be found to hear the case. After ten months of searching for suitable male replacements, Governor Pat Neff decided to appoint a special court composed of three women to decide the case. This court, consisting of Ward, Hattie Leah Henenberg, and Ruth Virginia Brazzil, met for five months and ultimately ruled in favor of Woodmen of the World.

Ward died in Houston on December 5, 1944.

== See also ==
- List of first women lawyers and judges in Texas
