= Rose Spector =

American judge

Rose Spector (born July 9, 1933) is a lawyer and judge based in Texas. In 1992, she became the first woman to be elected to the state's highest court. Until 2026, she was the last Democrat to win a non-incumbent statewide race in Texas

== Early life and education ==
Spector was born in San Antonio, Texas, the daughter of Jack Birenberg and Sophie Weprinsky Birenberg. Her family was Jewish; her father was in the garment trade. She attended Barnard College of Columbia University in New York, receiving her B.A. in 1954. She attended St. Mary's University School of Law, receiving her J.D., magna cum laude, in 1965 and was admitted to the Texas bar. Her older sister, Marcia Nasatir, was a film producer and vice-president of United Artists.

== Career as judge ==
Spector became a judge on the Municipal Court of the city of Olmos Park, Texas, in 1969 and of the Bexar County Court of Law in 1975. She served as District Judge of the 131st Judicial District of Texas from 1981 to 1992. She was elected Justice of the Texas Supreme Court in 1992 and served from 1993 until 1998. She was the first woman to be elected to the state's highest court. She served until 1998, when she lost her re-election during a sweep of judicial elections in Texas by Republican candidates. Alongside Raul A. Gonzalez, whose term also expired in 1998, Spector is one of the last two Democrats to have served as a Texas Supreme Court Justice.

Among her many judicial opinions, her dissent in Twyman v. Twyman is often studied in family law. In that case, the majority opinion was authored by then-justice John Cornyn, adopting the Restatement of Torts standard for intentional infliction of emotional distress, but Justice Spector dissenting, arguing that in this case, award of damages to the wife for the proven abuse of the wife by her husband should be upheld under the standards for negligent infliction of emotional distress that had been thought to apply at the time of the lower court's verdict.

== Sources ==
- Twyman v. Twyman, 855 S.W.2d 619 (Texas 1993).
- An Unusual History of Women Serving on the Texas Supreme Court
- Interview with Rose Spector, UTSA Oral History Project
- Cossman's The Story of Twyman v. Twyman: Politics, Tort Reform, and Emotional Distress in a Texas Divorce, in Carol Sanger, Family Law Stories
