= 2026 in Texas =

- Decades: 2000s; 2010s; 2020s
- See also: History of Texas; Historical outline of Texas; List of years in Texas; 2026 in the United States

The following is a list of events of the year 2026 in the U.S. state of Texas.

== Incumbents ==
=== State government ===
- Governor: Greg Abbott (R)
- Lieutenant Governor: Dan Patrick (R)
- Attorney General: Ken Paxton (R)
- Comptroller: Kelly Hancock (acting) (R)
- Land Commissioner: Dawn Buckingham (R)
- Agriculture Commissioner: Sid Miller (R)
- Railroad Commissioners: Christi Craddick (R), Wayne Christian (R), and Jim Wright (R)

== Events ==
=== January ===
- January 3 – Cuban national Geraldo Lunas Campos dies while being restrained by immigration agents at Camp East Montana in El Paso. His death is ruled a homicide. A witness to his death says Lunas Campos repeatedly said "I can't breathe" in Spanish while he was restrained.
- January 21 – Former Uvalde CISD Police officer Adrian Gonzales is acquitted of child abandonment and endangerment for his part in the response to the Robb Elementary School shooting that killed 19 in 2022. Gonzales was accused of abandoning his training and not confronting the gunman before he entered the school.
- January 24–27 – January 2026 North American winter storm: 6 people die across Texas due to snowstorms, including three young brothers who fall through an ice pond in Bonham.
- January 28 – Charles Victor Thompson is executed at the Huntsville Unit state prison for the murder of his former girlfriend and her new boyfriend in 1998. He is the first person to be executed in the U.S. in 2026.
- January 31
  - In an upset, Democrat Taylor Rehmet wins a special election in the Texas Senate District 9 special election, beating Leigh Wambsganss with 57.2% of the vote. The district had favored President Trump by 17 points in the 2024 presidential election.
  - 2025–26 Texas's 18th congressional district special election: Former Harris County Attorney Christian Menefee wins the special election run-off for the seat held by Sylvester Turner, who died in March 2025. Menefee beat former Houston City Councilmember Amanda Edwards.

=== February ===
- February 10–11 – The Federal Aviation Administration (FAA) abruptly closes the airspace above El Paso International Airport. Though the restrictions are initially announced to last until February 20, they are lifted the morning of February 11. It is later announced that the shutdown occurred after Customs and Border Protection (CBP) used an anti-drone laser to shoot down what turned out to be party balloons.
- February 21 – 25-year-old Joshua Orta dies in a car crash in San Antonio. Orta witnessed the ICE killing of his friend, American citizen Ruben Ray Martinez, on South Padre Island in March 2025. ICE's involvement in Martinez's killing had been disclosed to the public a week prior to Orta's death.
- February 26 – A Department of Defense anti-drone laser system shoots down a CBP drone near Fort Hancock.
- February 28 – Four people are killed and two are injured in a shooting in Edinburg. The Hidalgo County Sheriff says the shooting is connected to a road rage incident and dispute between neighbors.

=== March ===
- March 1 – A gunman kills three people and injures 15 outside a bar in Downtown Austin before being killed by police.
- March 3
  - Camp East Montana is closed to visitors due to a measles outbreak.
  - Primary Elections for various races in Texas are held.
    - U.S. Senate Election in Texas: State Representative James Talarico wins the Democratic primary, beating incumbent U.S. Representative Jasmine Crockett.
    - U.S. House Election, Texas District 2: State Representative Steve Toth wins the Republican primary, beating incumbent U.S. Representative Dan Crenshaw.
- March 5 – U.S. House Election, Texas District 23: Incumbent U.S. Representative Tony Gonzales drops out of his re-election campaign, following his admission that he had an affair with an aide who committed suicide by self-immolation. Brandon Herrera, a YouTuber and gun manufacturer, presumptively becomes the Republican nominee.
- March 5–17 – The 2026 World Baseball Classic is held at several locations, including Daikin Park in Houston.
- March 22 – Two unrelated mass shootings occur in Amarillo. A 40-year-old man is arrested for shooting five people at a home, killing two. A 41-year-old man kills two people at a storage facility, then kills two people and four others at a home.
- March 23
  - Immigration and Customs Enforcement agents are deployed to 14 airports nationwide, including William P. Hobby Airport and George Bush Intercontinental Airport.
  - A large explosion occurs at a Valero Energy oil refinery in Port Arthur. No injuries are reported.
- March 25–28 – The 2026 Conservative Political Action Conference is held at the Gaylord Texan Resort Hotel & Convention Center in Grapevine.
- March 27 – ESPN reports that the Connecticut Sun of the WNBA will be sold to the Fertitta family and relocated to Houston, where the Fertitta-owned Houston Rockets play.
- March 30 – A high school student shoots a teacher in Bulverde before killing himself.

=== April ===
- April 1 – The Texas Department of Criminal Justice implements a policy prohibiting prisoners from receiving donated hardcover books after many were found containing synthetic drugs.
- April 13 – Representative Tony Gonzales says he will resign from Congress on Tuesday after admitting to having an affair with a staff member.
- April 21 – An appeals court rules in favor of Texas Senate Bill 10, which requires public schools to display the Ten Commandments in classrooms.
- April 22 – The city of Houston amends an ordinance that limited police cooperation with ICE, following a threat by Governor Abbott to revoke funding.
- April 24 – A judge rules in favor of a 2023 state law that allows state police to arrest people suspected of being in the country illegally.
- April 25 – Two people are killed by tornados in north Texas, one in Runaway Bay and another near Springtown.
- April 27 – The Supreme Court rules 6–3 in favor of the state of Texas's redistricted House map that was designed to favor Republicans.
- April 30 – A plane carrying members of an Amarillo pickleball club crashes in Wimberley, killing five people.

=== May ===
- May 2 – Two people are killed and ten injured in a shooting at an apartment party in Amarillo.
- May 10 – Six people are found dead in a train boxcar in Laredo. A seventh person is found dead in San Antonio the next day, and their death is believed to be connected. Officials say the victims may have been smuggled into the United States from Mexico, and that they likely died of hyperthermia.
- May 15 – Texas Children's Hospital in Houston reach a settlement with Attorney General Paxton to open the country's first detransition clinic following a lawsuit over its staff providing gender-affirming care to minors.
- May 16–17 – Four people are injured in a series of shootings in South Austin. During the shooting spree, two firehouses are shot at, and four cars are stolen. Three teenagers are arrested.
- May 18 – The Texas A&M Aggies beat the Auburn Tigers to win the NCAA Division I women's tennis tournament.
- May 21 – Texas' first case of West Nile virus in 2026 is reported in Harris County.
- May 28 – A fire destroys a two-story apartment building in Dallas. Three people are killed and five are injured.

=== June ===
- June 1 – Artist Robert Wyland files a lawsuit against FIFA and others over the removal of his Whaling Wall mural in Dallas. The mural was painted over in May and replaced with art promoting the 2026 FIFA World Cup. Wyland's lawsuit accuses the World Cup organizers of violating a 1990 law that requires artists to be notified before painting over their murals.
- June 3 – The USDA confirms the presence of New World screwworm in Zavala County.
- June 4 – In college softball, the Texas Longhorns defeats the Texas Tech Red Raiders 4–1 in Game 2 of the Women's College World Series finals to win the 2026 NCAA Division I softball tournament, their back-to-back title.
- June 6 – The Sheraton Arlington Hotel in Arlington is being imploded ahead of the 2026 FIFA World Cup to make way for the new $500 million Loews resort, known as The Americana.
- June 9 – Karmelo Anthony, who stabbed Austin Metcalf at a high school track meet in Frisco in 2025, is convicted of murder.
- June 11–July 19 – The United States hosts the 2026 FIFA World Cup, with a number of matches being held in AT&T Stadium in Arlington and NRG Stadium in Houston.
- June 12 – A man fires at bystanders and barricades himself in an abandoned veterinary clinic in Midland. One person is killed and ten are injured. Following a standoff, police kill the man, who was already being sought for shooting a police officer days earlier.
- June 13 – James Harden is arrested in Harris County and charged with misdemeanor unlawful carrying of weapons.
- June 18 – In United States v. Hemani, the Supreme Court rules that a law banning users of controlled substances from possessing firearms is partly illegal. The case centered on Ali Hemani, who was charged for possessing firearms as a casual marijuana user.
- June 23 – Eight people convicted in connection to the shooting of a police officer near an ICE facility in Alvarado are sentenced, ranging from 30 to 100 years in prison. Benjamin Song, who was convicted of shooting the officer, is sentenced to 100 years in prison.
- June 24 – Camp Mystic, which was severely damaged in the July 2025 Central Texas floods that killed 28 people from the camp, files for bankruptcy.
- June 26 – The Texas State Board of Education approves a proposal that would require public school students to read Bible verses.
- June 28 – ICE agents detain a nun while she is walking to a church for Mass in McAllen. She is later released.

=== July ===
- July 1 – Universal Kids Resort opens in Frisco, Texas.
- July 7 – ICE agents fatally shoot Mexican national Lorenzo Salgado Araujo during a traffic stop in Houston, saying he attempted to ram agents.
- July 9 – The Tormenta Rampaging Run Dive roller coaster opens at Six Flags Over Texas, making it the tallest Dive Coaster and the first to exceed 300 feet as a height.
- July 15 – Floods strikes parts of Texas, including Uvalde and Kerrville. Two people are killed, one in Kerr County and another in Uvalde.

=== August ===
- August 7 – The Corpus Christi City Council votes to suspend Mayor Paulette Guajardo over a finding she committed "misconduct, malfeasance, incompetence, or inability or willful neglect of performance" related to a tax incentive agreement for a hotel project.
- August 9 – The former Electronic Data Systems (EDS) headquarters building is imploded in Plano, clearing the way for a new $1.3 billion AT&T global campus.
- August 12 – Two Fort Hood soldiers are killed in a helicopter crash near Salado.
- August 17 – The Trump administration pauses construction of a border wall project in Big Bend National Park.
- August 22 – A judge denies Karmelo Anthony's appeal for a new trial for the murder of Austin Metcalf, who Anthony stabbed to death at a Frisco track meet in 2025.
- August 25 – A federal judge strikes down a Texas law that banned drag shows in places where children may be present, saying it violates the First Amendment.
- August 28 – Three students are injured in a stabbing at Americas High School in El Paso. A 14-year-old is arrested.

=== September ===
- September 9-10 – The 2026 Republican National Convention was held, at the American Airlines Center in Dallas, Texas, ahead of the 2026 United States midterm elections.
- September 9 – The Texas Commission on Law Enforcement orders the Trinidad Police Department to disband following an investigation that found it did not meet the minimum requirements. The investigation was ordered after a woman was arrested by Trinidad Police for making a Facebook post criticizing the town's poor-quality water.
- September 18 – The Trump administration resumes construction of a border wall in the Big Bend area.
- September 19 – A man claiming to be a border wall contractor detains an activist and two journalists from the Big Bend Sentinel, blocking them from using a road.
- September 20 – An ICE agent shoots and injures Venezuelan national Wilber Rafael Garcés Pérez in Austin.
- September 26 – Misael Ramos, a candidate for city council in Austin, is arrested and charged with misdemeanor riot participation for alleged actions during a September 20 protest against the shooting of Wilber Garcés Pérez. Authorities accuse Ramos of moving barricades and sandbags to block traffic.
- September 30 – The Neiman Marcus flagship store in Downtown Dallas closes permanently.

=== October ===
- October 1 – Amber Guyger, a former Dallas Police officer who murdered her neighbor Botham Jean in his apartment in 2018, is granted parole.
- October 5 – President Trump approves the firing squad execution of Nidal Hasan, who committed a mass shooting at Fort Hood in 2009. The U.S. military has not carried out the death penalty since 1961.
- October 7
  - Trump holds a rally at Freeman Coliseum in San Antonio to support senate candidate Ken Paxton. At least 18 hecklers are removed during the rally.
  - The state of Texas executes Jamaal Howard, who killed a convenience store clerk in Silsbee in 2000. He is the first person to be executed in the United States since the failed execution of Christa Pike, who survived two injections of pentobarbital in Tennessee. Pentobarbital is the same substance used in Howard's execution.
- October 8 – The Pentagon says Nidal Hasan's execution will be live-streamed.
- October 10 – An ICE vehicle strikes a Mexican national who is fleeing on foot in Houston.
- October 15 – Trump announces Nidal Hasan's execution will no longer be live-streamed.
- October 17 – Ahead of a football game between the UTSA Roadrunners and Navy Midshipmen at the Alamodome, a service member falls while descending from the roof during a pregame demonstration. He is taken to the hospital, where he later dies. The game is still held as scheduled.
- October 23 – The Dallas Cowboys Cheerleaders announce they have unionized. The Dallas Cowboys announce they will recognize the new union.

=== November ===
- November 3 – 2026 Texas elections:
  - 2026 Texas gubernatorial election: State Representative Gina Hinojosa beats incumbent Governor Greg Abbott. She is the first Latina governor of Texas and first Democrat to win since Ann Richards in 1990.
  - 2026 Texas Attorney General election: In an upset, State Senator Nathan M. Johnson beats State Senator Mayes Middleton.
  - 2026 United States Senate election in Texas: State Representative James Talarico beats Texas Attorney General Ken Paxton. He is the first Democrat to win a senate race in Texas since 1988.
- November 15 – Boxer Jorge Linares, a Venezualan national, is detained by ICE at El Paso International Airport.

== Scheduled ==
- December 3 – Nidal Hasan will be executed by firing squad at Fort Hood.

== Deaths ==
- August 2 – Kay Granger, 83, U.S. Representative for TX-12 (1997–2025).

== See also ==
- 2026 in the United States
