= 2021 in Texas =

- Decades: 2000s; 2010s; 2020s
- See also: History of Texas; Historical outline of Texas; List of years in Texas; 2021 in the United States

The following is a list of events of the year 2021 in Texas.

== Incumbents ==
=== State government ===
- Governor: Greg Abbott (R)
- Lieutenant Governor: Dan Patrick (R)
- Attorney General: Ken Paxton (R)
- Comptroller: Glenn Hegar (R)
- Land Commissioner: George P. Bush (R)
- Agriculture Commissioner: Sid Miller (R)
- Railroad Commissioners: Christi Craddick (R), Wayne Christian (R), and Jim Wright (R)

=== City governments ===
- Mayor of Houston: Sylvester Turner (D)
- Mayor of San Antonio: Ron Nirenberg (I)
- Mayor of Dallas: Eric Johnson (R)
- Mayor of Austin: Steve Adler (D)
- Mayor of Fort Worth: Betsy Price (R) (until 15 July), Mattie Parker (R) (starting 15 July)
- Mayor of El Paso: Dee Margo (R) (until 26 June), Oscar Leeser (starting 26 June)
- Mayor of Arlington: Jim Ross (N/A)
- Mayor of Corpus Christi: Joe McComb then Paulette Guajardo (D)
- Mayor of Plano: Harry LaRosiliere (R) then John B. Muns (R)
- Mayor of Lubbock: Daniel Manning Pope (R)

== Events ==
- January 7 – Texas health officials report the state's first case of a new variant of SARS-CoV-2 in a resident of Harris County with no travel history.
- January 14 – Texas surpasses two million cases of COVID-19, becoming the second state to do so after California.
- January 23 – Garret Miller, a Texas man who participated in the storming of the United States Capitol, is charged for threatening to assassinate U.S. Rep. Alexandria Ocasio-Cortez.
- February – 2021 Texas power crisis, when cold weather and power outages affected millions of Texans
- February 3 – Disappearance of Cynthia Bah-Traore from Grandview, Texas.
- March 11 – Texas state Rep. Bryan Slaton introduced a bill that would abolish abortion and make it a criminal act, whereby women and physicians who received and performed abortions, respectively, could receive the death penalty.
- May – Lubbock, Texas, with a population of less than 270,000, voted to ban abortion with the "sanctuary city for the unborn ordinance", becoming the largest city in the U.S. to ban abortion.
- October 6 –
  - United States federal judge Robert L. Pitman issues an order to block the Texas Heartbeat Act.
  - Four people are wounded as a gunman opens fire at a high school in Arlington, Texas after a fight. The suspected attacker escaped from the scene, but was arrested several hours later.
- October 11 – Governor Greg Abbott signs an executive order prohibiting all entities in the state, including private companies, from enacting vaccine mandates.
- October 13 – Blue Origin NS-18:Blue Origin launches four crew into sub-orbit on a New Shepard rocket from its Corn Ranch spaceport in Van Horn, Texas. The crew includes Blue Origin Vice President Audrey Powers, NASA engineer Chris Boshuizen, space tourist Glen de Vries, and actor William Shatner. Shatner, best known for his portrayal of Captain Kirk in the Star Trek media franchise, becomes the oldest ever person in space at the age of 90.
- October 18 – Citing Roe v. Wade, the United States Department of Justice requests the Supreme Court to vacate the mandate of the Court of Appeals for the Fifth Circuit on allowing the Texas Heartbeat Act to remain in effect, thereby blocking the law.
- November 5 – Astroworld Festival crowd crush: Eight people are dead and hundreds more are injured during a stampede and crowd crush at the Astroworld Music Festival in Houston.
- December 20 – The United States reports its first confirmed death related to the Omicron variant in an unvaccinated man in his 50s in Harris County, who had underlying health issues.

== See also ==
- 2021 in the United States
- COVID-19 pandemic in Texas
