= 2022 in Texas =

- Decades: 2000s; 2010s; 2020s
- See also: History of Texas; Historical outline of Texas; List of years in Texas; 2022 in the United States

The following is a list of events of the year 2022 in Texas.

== Incumbents ==
=== State government ===
- Governor: Greg Abbott (R)
- Lieutenant Governor: Dan Patrick (R)
- Attorney General: Ken Paxton
- Comptroller: Glenn Hegar (R)
- Land Commissioner: George P. Bush (R)
- Agriculture Commissioner: Sid Miller (R)
- Railroad Commissioners: Christi Craddick (R), Wayne Christian (R), and Jim Wright (R)

=== City governments ===
- Mayor of Houston: Sylvester Turner (D)
- Mayor of San Antonio: Ron Nirenberg (I)
- Mayor of Dallas: Eric Johnson (R)
- Mayor of Austin: Steve Adler (D)
- Mayor of Fort Worth: Mattie Parker (R)
- Mayor of El Paso: Oscar Leeser (D)
- Mayor of Arlington: Jim Ross (N/A)
- Mayor of Corpus Christi: Paulette Guajardo (D)
- Mayor of Plano: John B. Muns (R)
- Mayor of Lubbock: Daniel Manning Pope (R) (until May), Trey Payne (R) (from May)

== Events ==
- January 15 – A gunman takes multiple people hostage at Congregation Beth Israel, a Jewish synagogue in Colleyville, Texas. He is later shot and killed by police, with no other fatalities and all four hostages being rescued.
- April 7 – Governor Abbott announced in a press conference a plan to direct the Texas Division of Emergency Management to bus illegal immigrants with 900 charter buses from Texas to Washington D.C, citing the potential surge of immigrants who would cross the border after Title 42 provisions regarding communicable disease were set to be rolled back by President Biden the next month.
  - April 13 – The first bus, carrying 24 immigrants, arrived in Washington D.C after 30 hours. A second bus arrived the next day.
- May 7 – Austin voters approve Proposition A by a 85–15 margin to prevent the enforcement of cannabis laws in most circumstances in the city (though police can still confiscate the drug).
- May 24 – In one of the deadliest school shootings in American history, nineteen children and two adults are killed in a shooting at Robb Elementary School in Uvalde, Texas. The 18-year-old shooter is killed at the scene in a shootout with police.
- May 27 – The National Rifle Association of America holds its annual convention in Houston, Texas. In the wake of the shooting at Robb Elementary School three days earlier, the pro-gun convention is met with protests from local residents.
- June 6 – Attorney Thomas J. Henry files a lawsuit in a Texas district court on behalf of four families of victims in the Robb Elementary School shooting. Levied against the estate of the suspected gunman, the lawsuit is a part of the investigation into the massacre.
- June 19 – The Republican Party of Texas holds its party's convention in Houston. Attendees approved many controversial resolutions, including the assertion that President Joe Biden "was not legitimately elected", calling for the full repeal of the Voting Rights Act of 1965, declaring homosexuality as "an abnormal lifestyle choice", as well as promoting Texan secession from the union.
- July 6 – The Department of Justice reports that it is investigating potential violations of civil rights by the state of Texas in its multi-billion dollar border mission.
- July 14 – Texas attorney general Ken Paxton sues the Department of Health and Human Services to prevent it from mandating that hospitals must perform abortions when the life of the mother is at risk, even if state law does not allow for such exception.
- August 30 – Texas reports an immunocompromised patient has suffered the first US death in the monkeypox outbreak.
- November 8 – The 2022 Texas gubernatorial election is held. Republican governor Greg Abbott is reelected.
- November 9 – Voters approve measures to decriminalize possession of small amounts of cannabis in the cities of San Marcos, Denton, Killeen, Elgin, and Harker Heights.

== See also ==
- 2022 in the United States
