= 2020 in Texas =

- Decades: 2000s; 2010s; 2020s
- See also: History of Texas; Historical outline of Texas; List of years in Texas; 2020 in the United States

The following is a list of events of the year 2020 in Texas.

== Incumbents ==
=== State government ===
- Governor: Greg Abbott (R)
- Lieutenant Governor: Dan Patrick (R)
- Attorney General: Ken Paxton (R)
- Comptroller: Glenn Hegar (R)
- Land Commissioner: George P. Bush (R)
- Agriculture Commissioner: Sid Miller (R)
- Railroad Commissioners: Christi Craddick (R), Wayne Christian (R), and Ryan Sitton (R)

=== City governments ===
- Mayor of Houston: Sylvester Turner (D)
- Mayor of San Antonio: Ron Nirenberg (I)
- Mayor of Dallas: Eric Johnson (R)
- Mayor of Austin: Steve Adler (D)
- Mayor of Fort Worth: Betsy Price (R) (until 15 July), Mattie Parker (R) (starting 15 July)
- Mayor of El Paso: Dee Margo (R)
- Mayor of Arlington: Jim Ross (N/A)
- Mayor of Corpus Christi: Joe McComb
- Mayor of Plano: Harry LaRosiliere (R)
- Mayor of Lubbock: Daniel Manning Pope (R)

== Events ==
- January 16 – Killer nurse Genene Jones is sentenced to life in prison for the murder of a baby boy in San Antonio in 1981. The new conviction came as a result of attempts to prevent Jones from leaving prison.
- January 17 – Winter Storm Jacob: Widespread snowfall and freezing rain across the Midwest leads to travel disruption, with rare snowfall being recorded on the Texas Panhandle.
- January 24 – 2020 Houston explosion: Two people are killed and 18 injured in a warehouse explosion in Houston.
- February 3 – A shooting at a dormitory at Texas A&M University–Commerce, leaves two dead and one wounded.
- February 5 – Winter Storm Kade brings heavy snowfall to much of the United States, with 14 inches of snow recorded as far south as Texas.
- April 26 – A survivor of the terrorist mass shooting that occurred at El Paso in August 2019 dies after nine months of hospitalization, raising the death toll to 23.
- May 21 – Naval Air Station Corpus Christi attack: A motorist opens fire and attempts to breach the perimeter of Naval Air Station Corpus Christi, injuring a security guard, before being shot and killed. FBI officials determine the incident to be terrorism-related and say a second person of interest may be at large. The shooter is later identified as a Syria-born man who expressed support for ISIS and Al-Qaeda in the Arabian Peninsula.
- May 29 –
  - In Houston, at least 137 people are arrested, eight police officers are hospitalized, and 16 police vehicles are vandalized in a riot.
  - A SpaceX Starship prototype (SN4) is destroyed in a large explosion during static fire testing at the SpaceX South Texas Launch Site.
- June 3 – Texas State University President Denise Trauth announces on social media that a 20-year-old African-American student protestor, Justin Howell, had been critically injured by a bean bag round fired by Austin police on Sunday. Police maintain that Howell was not the intended target.
- September 4 – Five people die in Texas during Hurricane Laura.
- September 17 – Texas governor Greg Abbott eases COVID-19 restrictions on retail stores, gyms, and restaurants. Bars, however, remain closed.
- October 10 – Over 700,000 power outages are reported in the U.S. states of Louisiana, Texas, and Mississippi due to Hurricane Delta.

== See also ==
- 2020 in the United States
- COVID-19 pandemic in Texas
