= 2027 in Texas =

- Decades: 2000s; 2010s; 2020s
- See also: History of Texas; Historical outline of Texas; List of years in Texas; 2027 in the United States

The following is a list of events of the year 2027 in Texas.

== Events ==
=== Planned or predicted ===
- January 1 - 2027 Cotton Bowl Classic
- January 2 - 2027 First Responder Bowl
- February 6 - First race of the Austin ePrix
