= 2019 in Texas =

- Decades: 1990s; 2000s; 2010s; 2020s
- See also: History of Texas; Historical outline of Texas; List of years in Texas; 2019 in the United States

The following is a list of events of the year 2019 in Texas.

== Incumbents ==
=== State government ===
- Governor: Greg Abbott (R)
- Lieutenant Governor: Dan Patrick (R)
- Attorney General: Ken Paxton (R)
- Comptroller: Glenn Hegar (R)
- Land Commissioner: George P. Bush (R)
- Agriculture Commissioner: Sid Miller (R)
- Railroad Commissioners: Christi Craddick (R), Wayne Christian (R), and Ryan Sitton (R)

=== City governments ===
- Mayor of Houston: Sylvester Turner (D)
- Mayor of San Antonio: Ron Nirenberg (I)
- Mayor of Dallas: Eric Johnson (R)
- Mayor of Austin: Steve Adler (D)
- Mayor of Fort Worth: Betsy Price (R) (until 15 July), Mattie Parker (R) (starting 15 July)
- Mayor of El Paso: Dee Margo (R)
- Mayor of Arlington: Jim Ross (N/A)
- Mayor of Corpus Christi: Joe McComb
- Mayor of Plano: Harry LaRosiliere (R)
- Mayor of Lubbock: Daniel Manning Pope (R)

== Events ==
- January 3 – A man shoots three children to death and wounds a woman in Texas City.
- January 23 – Blue Origin successfully launches its New Shepard 3 rocket and completes the tenth sub-orbital test flight, reaching an altitude of 106.9 km (351,000 ft), carrying its crew capsule and making a controlled upright landing in West Texas.
- January 28 – Pecan Park raid: Texas Police shoot and kill two homeowners after invading their house. 5 officers were injured in a substantial shootout in Harris County near Houston. Reports later indicated one of the officers lied that drugs were in the house.
- March 14 – former U.S. representative Beto O'Rourke announces he is running for the Democratic Party's nomination for President of the United States in the 2020 election.
- April 24 – John William King is executed by lethal injection by the state of Texas, 21 years after the murder of James Byrd Jr., for which he was sentenced.
- April 25 –
  - Tornadoes spawned by severe weather in Texas and Louisiana cause at least five deaths and over 17,000 power outages.
  - A Texas semi truck driver with no criminal record is arrested and faces 4 counts of vehicular homicide after he told police his brakes were failing on I-70 as it descended from the mountains in Colorado and caused a 28 vehicle crash.
- June 9 – At least one person is killed and six others are injured after a crane collapses onto an apartment building in Dallas amid severe weather.
- June 30 – Ten people are killed when a Beechcraft BE-350 King Air crashes into a hangar at Addison Airport in Addison.
- July 13 – U.S. Vice President Mike Pence says the conditions under which asylum seekers are being held in facilities along the U.S. border with Mexico are unacceptable, after visiting two federal detention centers in Texas, remaining the highest-ranking member of the Trump administration to say so. He calls upon the U.S. Congress to act.
- July 30 – Federal agents join the investigation of a fire that destroys a 125-year-old landmark Catholic Church of the Visitation in Westphalia. After storms destroyed two earlier church structures in the 1880s, the Church of Visitation was completed in February 1895 and dedicated on May 23, 1895.
- July 31 – An explosion at an ExxonMobil oil refinery in Baytown hospitalizes 66 people.
- August 3 – 2019 El Paso shooting: At least 22 people are killed and 24 others injured in a mass shooting at a Walmart in El Paso. A suspect Patrick Crusius of Allen, was captured alive. The case is being investigated as domestic terrorism given that Patrick Crusius had posted a 4-page white nationalist manifesto titled The Inconvenient Truth on 8chan where he cited a supposed "Hispanic invasion of Texas" and "Simply trying to defend my country from cultural and ethnic replacement" as motivation for the shooting. The suspect was also inspired by Brenton Tarrant, the perpetrator of the Christchurch mosque shooting in New Zealand.
- August 6 – Scientists at the Spring, Arch Mission Foundation confirm that tardigrades in a cryptobiotic state were added to the payload of the failed SpaceIL Beresheet lander that crashed on the Moon on 11 April 2019, and may have survived the crash.
- August 20 – The Texas Department of Information Resources reports that the computer systems of 23 towns in the state were hit by a ransomware attack on August 16. "One single threat actor" is suspected.
- August 31 – Midland–Odessa shootings: At least seven people are killed and 21 others wounded in a mass shooting in West Texas, between the cities of Midland and Odessa. The shooter is shot and killed in Odessa.
- September 1 – New laws come into effect in the state of Texas that allow for less restrictions on the carrying of guns in "schools, places of worship, foster homes where children live and apartments".
- September 3 – Walmart announces it will stop selling ammunition for handguns and some assault weapons in all of its American stores in response to a shooting that killed 22 and injured 24 at one of its El Paso, stores the month prior. It and Kroger also ask customers not to bring guns into the stores.
- September 12 – The third major Democratic Party televised debate takes place at the Health and Physical Education Arena in Houston, with a focus on health care in the United States.
- September 17 – Tropical Storm Imelda makes landfall in Texas, threatening severe flash flooding throughout Eastern Texas and the Houston area.
- September 21 – Authorities in Texas report a fifth death from Tropical Storm Imelda.
- October 12 – Killing of Atatiana Jefferson: In Fort Worth, a woman is shot dead in her bedroom by a policeman sent to check on her welfare.
- October 14 – Aaron Dean, the Fort Worth police officer who shot a woman to death in her bedroom during what was intended to be a welfare check, resigns his position, and later that day is arrested and formally charged with murder in the case.
- October 20 – Tornadoes strike North Texas as part of an outbreak.
- October 27 – Two men die and ten others are injured in a mass shooting at a Halloween party in Greenville.
- November 1 – Former Texas representative Beto O'Rourke drops out of the presidential primaries.
- November 27 – A chemical plant producing butadiene in Port Neches explodes and burns. It damages thousands of buildings over several square miles and sending three workers to the hospital.
- December 1 – Three people are killed in a plane crash in San Antonio.
- December 29 – West Freeway Church of Christ shooting: A man kills two people and injures another at a church in White Settlement before being killed by a security guard and a civilian.

== See also ==
- 2019 in the United States
