= 1845 in Texas =

- Decades: 1820s; 1830s; 1840s; 1850s; 1860s
- See also: History of Texas (1845–1860); Historical outline of Texas; List of years in Texas; 1845 in the United States

The following is a list of events of the year 1845 in Texas.

== Incumbents ==
- President: Anson Jones (until December 29)
- Vice President: Kenneth L. Anderson (until July 3), vacant (July 3-December 29)

== Events ==
- December 15 – 1845 Texas gubernatorial election: J. Pinckney Henderson is elected as the first governor of the state of Texas, with his term beginning the following year.
- December 29 – The Republic of Texas is annexed, and admitted to the union of the United States, officially establishing the State of Texas.

== See also ==
- 1845 in the United States
