= 2023 in Texas =

- Decades: 2000s; 2010s; 2020s
- See also: History of Texas; Historical outline of Texas; List of years in Texas; 2023 in the United States

The following is a list of events of the year 2023 in Texas.

== Incumbents ==
=== State government ===
- Governor: Greg Abbott (R)
- Lieutenant Governor: Dan Patrick (R)
- Attorney General: Ken Paxton (R) (suspended May 27 to September 16)
- Comptroller: Glenn Hegar (R)
- Land Commissioner: George P. Bush (R) (until January 10), Dawn Buckingham (R) (since January 10)
- Agriculture Commissioner: Sid Miller (R)
- Railroad Commissioners: Christi Craddick (R), Wayne Christian (R), and Jim Wright (R)

=== City governments ===
- Mayor of Houston: Sylvester Turner (D)
- Mayor of San Antonio: Ron Nirenberg (I)
- Mayor of Dallas: Eric Johnson (R)
- Mayor of Austin: Steve Adler (D)
- Mayor of Fort Worth: Mattie Parker (R)
- Mayor of El Paso: Oscar Leeser (D)
- Mayor of Arlington: Jim Ross (N/A)
- Mayor of Corpus Christi: Paulette Guajardo (D)
- Mayor of Plano: John B. Muns (R)
- Mayor of Lubbock: Trey Payne (R)

== Elections ==
Elections were held on November 7, 2023. The only statewide election was a vote on 14 proposed amendments to the Texas Constitution. A special election took place to fill the vacancy from Texas's 2nd House of Representatives district, which was followed by a runoff on January 30, 2024. In addition, Texas counties, cities, and school and other special districts had local elections and other ballot issues, such as bond proposals.

== Events ==
- January 10 – The 88th Texas Legislature convenes at noon (CST) following the 2022 Texas elections.
- January 24 – A large and intense EF3 tornado tears through the Houston metropolitan area, which causes the National Weather Service in Houston to issue their first tornado emergency.
- March 6 – State representative Bryan Slaton introduces the Texas Independence Referendum Act which, if passed, would call for a state referendum on the secession of Texas from the United States. The bill would later fail to get out of committee before the end of the regular session.
- April 1 – Federal judge Robert L. Pitman orders that twelve books containing LGBT and racial content which were banned by Llano County school officials must be returned to school shelves.
- April 18 – 18-year-old Payton Washington is shot and critically wounded in an H-E-B parking lot after a friend mistakenly opened the door to the wrong vehicle in the wake of similar incidents in Missouri, New York, and North Carolina.
- April 20
  - SpaceX's Starship rocket, the largest and most powerful rocket ever built, launches for the first time in a test flight from SpaceX Starbase in Boca Chica. It explodes four minutes after launch.
  - The Texas Senate passes a bill that would require that the Ten Commandments be displayed in every classroom of every public school. The bill would later fail to pass the Texas House of Representatives.
- April 28 – A shooting occurs in Cleveland killing five, and the suspect is caught after four days.
- May 6 – Nine people are killed, including the perpetrator, after a mass shooting at a mall in Allen.
- May 7 – Eight people are killed after a vehicle drives into pedestrians outside a migrant center in Brownsville.
- May 9 – The Texas House of Representatives votes unanimously to expel Bryan Slaton from House District 2 following an investigation that determined he had engaged in inappropriate sexual conduct with an aide.
- May 27 – In a 121-23 vote, the Texas House of Representatives votes to impeach Attorney General Ken Paxton, the third impeachment in the state's history.
- May 29 – The 88th Texas Legislature adjourns, and its 1st special session convenes.
- June 27 – The 1st special session of the 88th Texas Legislature adjourns, and its 2nd special session convenes.
- August 22 – Tropical Storm Harold makes landfall in South Texas, causing flash flooding, power outages, and tornado warnings.
- August 28 – Katy Independent School District board members, in a 4–3 vote, enact a four-page gender identity policy, including a requirement for district employees to inform parents if a student requests the use of different pronouns or identifies as transgender.
- October 6 – Jonathan Stickland, former Republican Texas politician and president of the Defend Texas Liberty PAC, meets with white nationalist Nick Fuentes for several hours. Stickland was later replaced as president of the PAC following the meeting.
- October 9 – The 3rd special session of the 88th Texas Legislature convenes.
- November 7
  - The 2023 Texas elections are held. Voters approve 13 out of 14 amendments in the constitutional amendment election. A special election is held to fill the vacancy in Texas's 2nd House of Representatives district, which will be followed by a runoff on January 30, 2024.
  - The 4th special session of the 88th Texas Legislature convenes.
- December 18 – Abbott signs Texas Senate Bill 4 into law. The bill allows state officials to arrest and deport migrants who enter the state illegally.

== See also ==
- 2023 in the United States
