= 2025 in Texas =

- Decades: 2000s; 2010s; 2020s
- See also: History of Texas; Historical outline of Texas; List of years in Texas; 2025 in the United States

The following is a list of events of the year 2025 in the U.S. state of Texas.

== Incumbents ==
=== State government ===
- Governor: Greg Abbott (R)
- Lieutenant Governor: Dan Patrick (R)
- Attorney General: Ken Paxton (R)
- Comptroller: Glenn Hegar (R) (until July 1), Kelly Hancock (acting) (R) (starting July 1)
- Land Commissioner: Dawn Buckingham (R)
- Agriculture Commissioner: Sid Miller (R)
- Railroad Commissioners: Christi Craddick (R), Wayne Christian (R), and Jim Wright (R)

=== City governments ===
- Mayor of Austin: Kirk Watson (D)
- Mayor of Dallas: Eric Johnson (R)
- Mayor of El Paso: Oscar Leeser (D) (until January 6), Renard Johnson (D) (since January 6)
- Mayor of Fort Worth: Mattie Parker (R)
- Mayor of Houston: John Whitmire (D)
- Mayor of Lubbock: Mark McBrayer (R)
- Mayor of San Antonio: Ron Nirenberg (I) (until June 18), Gina Ortiz Jones (D) (since June 18)

== Events ==
=== January ===
- January 16 – SpaceX launches its seventh test flight of the Starship launch vehicle, with an improved second stage out of its Starbase launch site in Boca Chica. The company catches the first stage but the second stage breaks up shortly before engine shutdown.

=== February ===
- February 24 – The Department of State Health Services in Texas places several major cities in the state on high alert due to a measles outbreak that spreads to 99 people in Texas and New Mexico, the third-largest outbreak since it was considered eliminated in the U.S. in 2000.
- February 25 – The Texas Department of State Health Services reports the first death in the ongoing measles outbreak. The decedent is a child who died in a hospital in Lubbock.
- February 27 – Two people are killed when a Robinson R44 helicopter crashes on a private property in Uvalde.
- February 28 – The number of measles cases in Texas increases to 146 with 20 people hospitalized, spanning nine counties.

=== March ===
- March 4 – Strong storms and tornados cause damage across North Texas, with thousands losing power in the Dallas-Fort Worth metroplex.
- March 15 – An Immigration and Customs Enforcement agent kills American citizen Ruben Ray Martinez during a stop in South Padre Island, with ICE claiming he hit an officer with his car. ICE's involvement in the shooting is not disclosed until February 2026.

=== April ===
- April 2 – 17-year-old Austin Metcalf is stabbed to death at a track meet in Frisco. Another 17-year-old is charged with murder.

=== May ===
- May 3 – Voters, largely employees of SpaceX, approve a measure to incorporate the space of Cameron County that SpaceX occupies into the city of Starbase.
- May 4 – One person is killed and 13 injured in a mass shooting at a family party in southeast Houston.
- May 25 – The Texas House of Representatives passes a bill that would require the Ten Commandments to be posted in every public school classroom in Texas.
- May 28 – The Texas Senate passes the Ten Commandments bill.

=== June ===
- June 6 – Texas beats Texas Tech to win the 2025 NCAA Division I softball tournament, their first title.

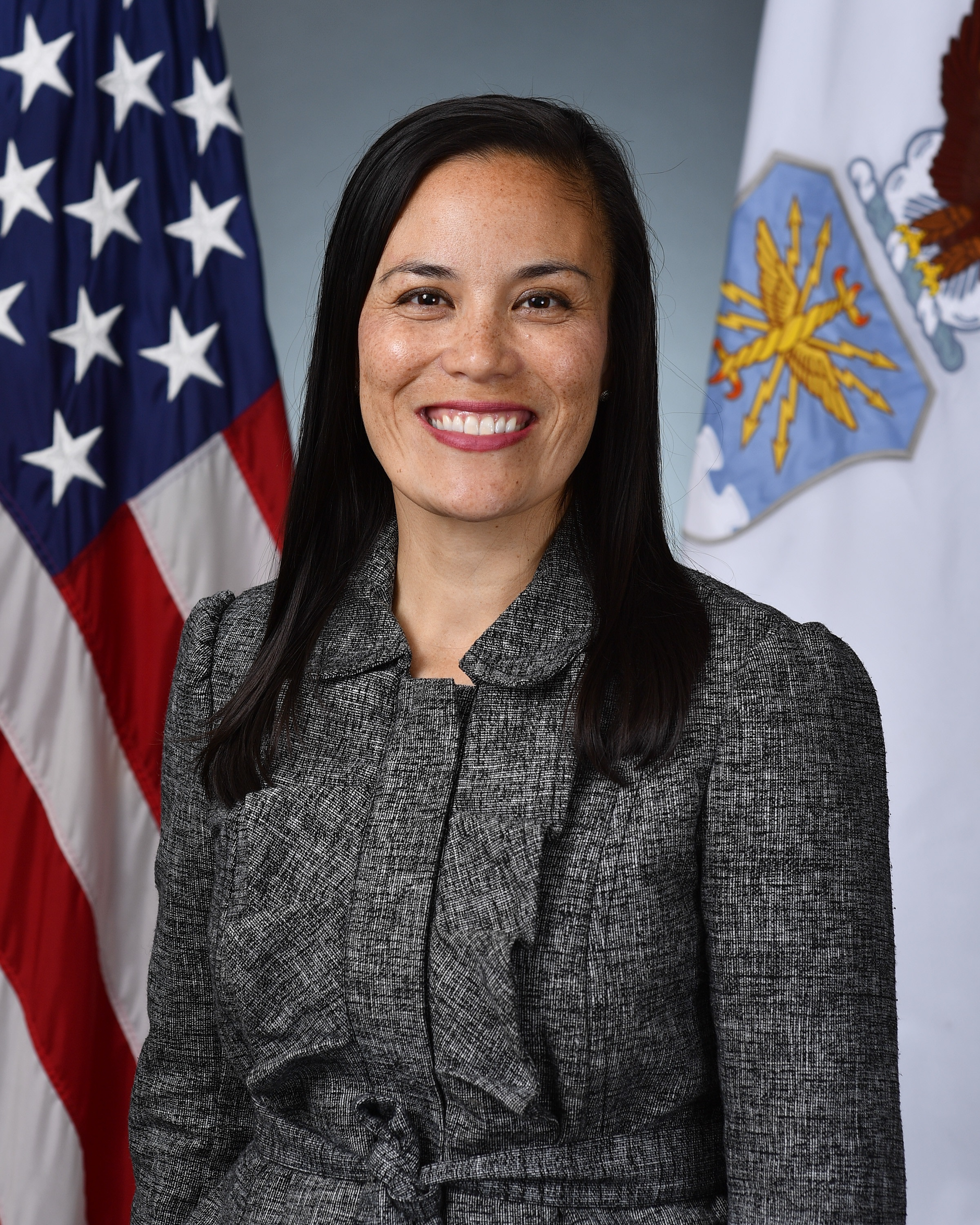
June 7: Gina Ortiz Jones (pictured) is elected mayor of San Antonio.

- June 7 — 2025 San Antonio mayoral election: In San Antonio, Gina Ortiz Jones is elected mayor. She is the city's first lesbian mayor and the first female Asian American mayor of a major city in Texas.
- June 12 – At least thirteen people are killed by flooding in San Antonio.
- June 20 – Texas' Supreme Court rules that Southwest Airlines pilots can sue Boeing over 737 MAX crashes.
- June 21 – Governor Abbott signs a law that will require all public schools to display the Ten Commandments in their classrooms. A similar law was blocked by a federal court in Louisiana the previous day.
- June 27 – The Supreme Court upholds the Texas law requiring age verification for accessing pornographic websites.

=== July ===
- July 3 – Over a hundred people are killed by flooding in central Texas, with Kerr County hit the hardest. Multiple summer camps, including Camp Mystic, are hit by floods, and the casualties include campers, staff, and camp directors.

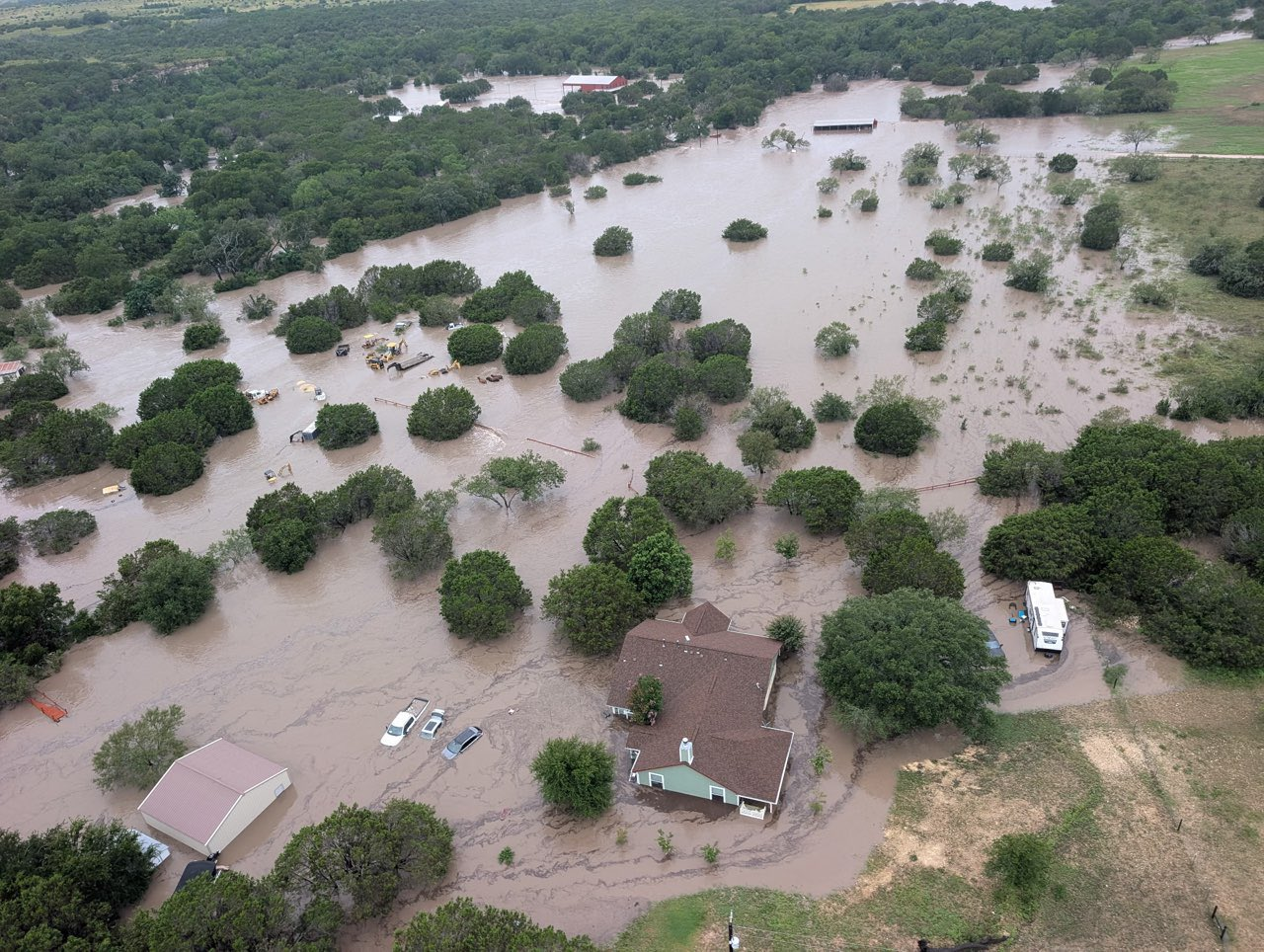
July 5: Aftermath of severe floods in Kerrville.

- July 4 – 2025 Alvarado ICE facility attack: An Alvarado Police Department officer is shot in the neck while responding to vandalism of and the use of fireworks outside a Immigration and Customs Enforcement facility in Alvarado.
- July 7 – A U.S. Customs and Border Protection station in McAllen is attacked by a 27-year-old gunman who injures a McAllen Police Department officer before he is fatally shot by local police and Border Patrol officers.
- July 18 – At least four people are killed and over a dozen others are injured in a multiple-vehicle collision on Interstate 35 in San Antonio.
- July 21 – A construction worker is killed when he is crushed by falling materials. The accident occurs at the site of Camp East Montana, an immigration detention center in El Paso.

=== August ===
- August 1 - Ghislaine Maxwell transferred to minimum security prison in Bryan, Texas
- August 3 – At least 51 Democratic members of the Texas House of Representatives leave the state in a bid to prevent the house from voting on a proposed congressional map that was deliberately drawn to yield more Republican representatives in the U.S. House of Representatives. At least 100 of the 150 members of the Texas House are required to be in the state for a vote to proceed.
- August 4 – The Texas House votes to issue civil arrest warrants for the Democrats who left the state. The civil arrest warrants only apply in Texas and are largely symbolic.
- August 11 – Three people are fatally shot in the parking lot of a Target store in Austin. A suspect is arrested in another part of the city.
- August 17 – An ICE detention center dubbed the "Lone Star Lockup" opens at Fort Bliss in El Paso. The Trump administration says it is the largest federal detention center in history.
- August 18 – The Democrats who left Texas return to the state. After returning, those who left are required to sign a form requiring Texas Department of Public Safety escorts. One representative, Nicole Collier, refuses to sign the slip and remains in the House chambers until August 20.
- August 29 – Governor Greg Abbott signs a new congressional map into law.

=== September ===
- September 10 – Motel owner Chandra Nagamallaiah is killed and decapitated at his motel in Dallas. A motel employee is arrested and charged with murder.

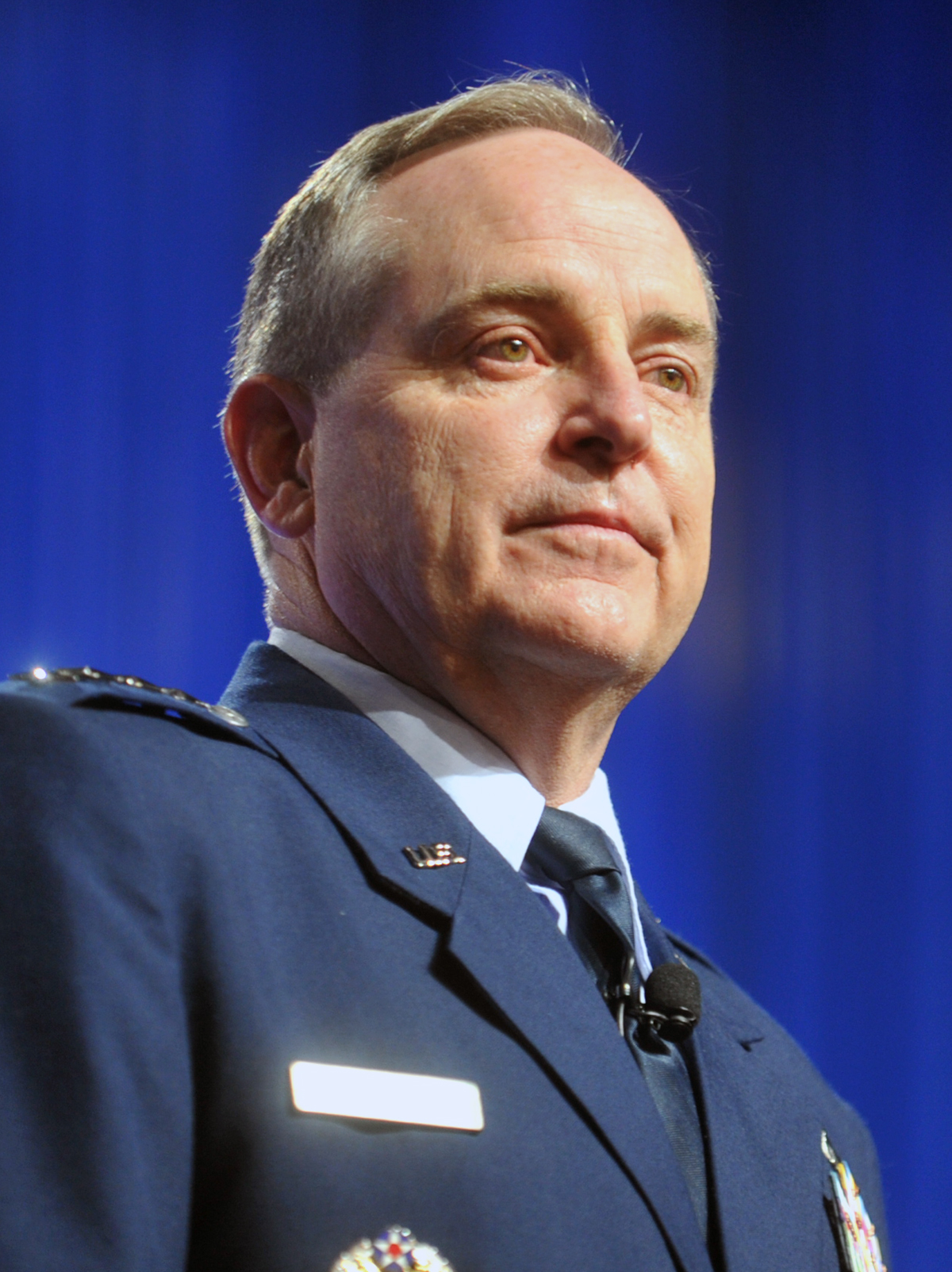
September 18: Texas A&M President Mark A. Welsh III (pictured) resigns his position.

- September 18 – Texas A&M University President Mark A. Welsh III resigns following pressure over a video of a student confronting a professor for having gender-related content in a course on children's literature. Welsh initially refused to fire the professor, but did so a day later.
- September 24 – Three detainees are shot at an ICE field office in Dallas. The shooter dies by suicide.
- September 26 – Authorities in Austin announce they have identified serial killer Robert Eugene Brashers as the suspect behind the 1991 murders of four employees at a yogurt shop.
- September 27 – Two people are killed and five injured in a shooting at the Lucky Eagle Casino on the Kickapoo reservation. A suspect is arrested.

=== October ===
- October 4 – Four children are shot in Angleton, two fatally. The mother of the children is charged with murder.
- October 5 – Governor Abbott says Trump will send 400 members of the Texas National Guard to Chicago, Illinois and Portland, Oregon.
- October 26 – A group of Buddhist monks begin a long-distance pilgrimage from Fort Worth, setting out to reach Washington, D.C. to promote peace and unity.

=== November ===
- November 4 – Governor Abbott jokes that he would impose a 100% tariff on New Yorkers moving to Texas following the 2025 New York City mayoral election, despite states not having the ability to issue tariffs. He would later clarify that he was only joking.
- November 5 – Dallas Cowboys defensive end Marshawn Kneeland commits suicide following a police pursuit in Frisco.
- November 8 – An employee at a San Antonio landscaping supply company kills three co-workers in a workplace shooting before killing himself.
- November 18
  - A panel of five judges blocks Texas's new congressional map, saying it appears to be an illegal race-based gerrymander.
  - Governor Abbott declares the Council on American-Islamic Relations a terrorist group.
- November 19 – Two monks involved in the Walk for Peace that began in October are injured when their escort vehicle is struck by another vehicle near Dayton.

=== December ===
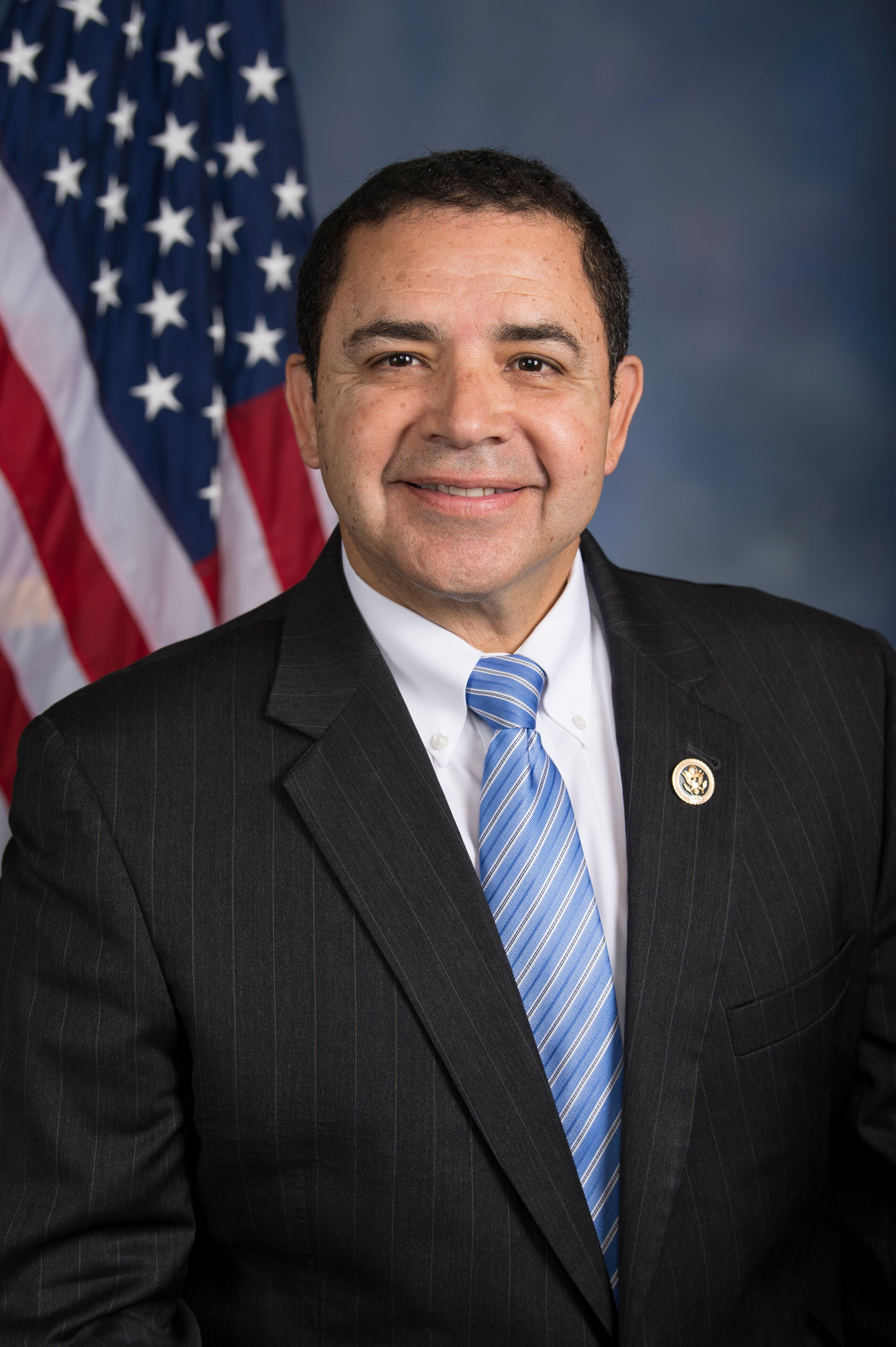
December 3: President Trump pardons Henry Cuellar (pictured) and his wife.

- December 3 – President Trump pardons Representative Henry Cuellar (D) and his wife, who were under indictment for multiple charges including bribery.
- December 4 – The Supreme Court overturns a lower court decision that blocked Texas's new congressional map.
- December 21 – The Texas A&M Aggies beat the Kentucky Wildcats 3–0 to win the 2025 NCAA Division I women's volleyball tournament, the first title for the Aggies.
- December 31 – 2025 Cotton Bowl Classic (December): In an upset, the 10-seed Miami Hurricanes beat the Ohio State Buckeyes 24–14 to advance to the national semifinals of the College Football Playoff.

== See also ==
- 2025 in the United States
