= 1986 in Texas =

- Decades: 1960s; 1970s; 1980s; 1990s; 2000s
- See also: History of Texas; Historical outline of Texas; List of years in Texas; 1986 in the United States

The following is a list of events of the year 1986 in Texas.

== Events ==
- November 4 - 1986 Texas Gubernatorial election
- Texas Sesquicentennial

== Births ==
- June 24 - Solange Knowles
- June 26 - Brittney Karbowski
- December 4 - Koby Clemens

== Deaths ==
- February 2 - Gino Hernandez
- September 14 - Gordon McLendon
- December 1 - Bobby Layne
