= 2024 in Texas =

- Decades: 2000s; 2010s; 2020s
- See also: History of Texas; Historical outline of Texas; List of years in Texas; 2024 in the United States

The following is a list of events of the year 2024 in Texas. Texas is estimated to have a population of roughly 31,000,000 in 2024.

== Incumbents ==
=== State government ===
- Governor: Greg Abbott (R)
- Lieutenant Governor: Dan Patrick (R)
- Attorney General: Ken Paxton (R)
- Comptroller: Glenn Hegar (R)
- Land Commissioner: Dawn Buckingham (R)
- Agriculture Commissioner: Sid Miller (R)
- Railroad Commissioners: Christi Craddick (R), Wayne Christian (R), and Jim Wright (R)

=== City governments ===
- Mayor of Houston: John Whitmire (D)
- Mayor of San Antonio: Ron Nirenberg (I)
- Mayor of Dallas: Eric Johnson (R)
- Mayor of Austin: Kirk Watson (D)
- Mayor of Fort Worth: Mattie Parker (R)
- Mayor of El Paso: Oscar Leeser (D)
- Mayor of Arlington: Jim Ross (N/A)
- Mayor of Corpus Christi: Paulette Guajardo (D)
- Mayor of Plano: John B. Muns (R)
- Mayor of Lubbock: Trey Payne (R) (until May 4), Mark McBrayer (R) (since May 4)

== Elections ==
Elections are scheduled to be held on November 5, 2024. Seats up for election will be all seats of the Texas Legislature, all 38 seats in the United States House of Representatives, and the Class I seat to the United States Senate, for which two-term incumbent Republican Senator Ted Cruz is running for re-election. Texas will have 40 electoral votes in the Electoral College in the federal presidential election. In addition, Texas counties, cities, and school and other special districts may have local elections and other ballot issues, such as bond proposals.

== Events ==
=== January ===
- January 5 – Governor Greg Abbott makes controversial comments about Texas shooting migrants who cross the Mexico–United States border on a Dana Loesch Show which leads to condemnations from Democratic party members and Mexico.
- January 11 – The start of the Standoff at Eagle Pass. The Texas National Guard took control over Shelby Park, a 47-acre (19 ha) area of parkland in the town of Eagle Pass, situated along the Rio Grande river that separates the Mexico–United States border, after Texas Governor Greg Abbott signed an emergency declaration to close down the park. Abbott cited the Mexico–United States border crisis and the need to secure the Mexican-American border in his declaration. The Texas National Guard blocked U.S. Border Patrol agents from patrolling the area.
- January 22 – The Supreme Court of the United States issued an order to vacate an injunction by the 5th U.S. Circuit Court of Appeals that prevented Border Patrol agents from cutting Concertina wire, which the National Guard has been using to make a fence in Shelby Park. On January 24, Abbott released a statement in defiance of the Court, stating that Texas would refuse to let federal authorities access the park, vowing to "protect the sovereignty of our state."
- January 30 – A runoff of the special election for Texas's 2nd House of Representatives district is held between Brent Money and Jill Dutton. Jill Dutton wins by 111 votes.
- January 31 – Attorney General Ken Paxton launches lawsuits against the cities of Austin, San Marcos, Killeen, Elgin, and Denton to block voter-approved ordinances (adopted in 2022) instructing local police not to enforce state laws against possession and distribution of cannabis.

=== February ===
- February 12 – A shooting occurs at Lakewood Church in Houston, injuring two. The perpetrator was killed by off duty police.

=== March ===
- March 19 – In United States v. Texas, the U.S. Supreme Court declines to block a Texas Senate bill allowing officials to arrest and deport migrants.

=== April ===
- April 8 – A total solar eclipse is viewable in Central and North Texas, with the path of total eclipse over the Dallas–Fort Worth metroplex and parts of Greater Austin and Greater San Antonio.
- April 12 – 2024 Texas Department of Public Safety building truck crash: A man crashes a semi-trailer truck into a Texas Department of Public Safety building, killing one person and injuring thirteen others.
- April 24 – Police arrest dozens of pro-Palestinian protesters at the University of Texas at Austin.
- April 29 – Gov. Abbott sends a letter to the Texas Education Agency instructing it to ignore U.S. President Joe Biden's revisions to Title IX adding protections for LGBTQ+ students.

=== May ===
- May 6
  - 2024 East Texas floods: Gov. Abbott confirms three deaths related to storms causing flooding in East Texas and Greater Houston since late April.
  - The U.S. Department of Education’s Office for Civil Rights opens an investigation into Katy Independent School District's gender identity policy, which board members passed on August 28, 2023 and requires district employees to disclose to parents if a student requests the use of different pronouns or identifies as transgender.
- May 8
  - University of Houston campus police dismantle pro-Palestinian encampments and arrest two students.
  - Following the April 29 letter to the Texas Education Agency, Gov. Abbott sends a letter to Texas public university systems and community colleges directing them not to comply with U.S. President Joe Biden's revisions to Title IX adding protections for LGBTQ+ students.
- May 14 – The Subcommittee on Higher Education of the Texas Senate holds a hearing to gather testimony from students and university leaders on issues concerning universities, including anti-Semitism, pro-Palestine protests, free speech, and to ensure universities have complied with Senate Bill 17 banning diversity, equity and inclusion (DEI) offices.
- May 16 – Abbott pardons Daniel Perry, who was sentenced to 25 years in prison for killing a man at a Black Lives Matter protest in 2020.
- May 22
  - Uvalde school shooting: The city of Uvalde, Texas, reaches a $2 million settlement with the families of the victims of the shooting.
  - Attorney General Ken Paxton files a lawsuit against the Equal Employment Opportunity Commission and members of the Biden administration to contest EEOC guidance stating that denying employees accommodations for their gender identity is workplace harassment.
- May 23 – The Republican Party of Texas begins its biennial convention. Several Republican officials including Attorney General Ken Paxton, Lt. Gov Dan Patrick, and Party Chair Matt Rinaldi criticize Texas House Speaker Dade Phelan for not being conservative enough, intensifying the Texas GOP civil war.
- May 24
  - The Republican Party of Texas elects Abraham George as the next chair.
  - Aftermath of the Uvalde school shooting: The families in Uvalde, Texas file a lawsuit against Daniel Defense and Activision Blizzard for creating the DDM4 V7 gun and promoting the weapon through the game Call of Duty. They also filed a lawsuit against Meta Platforms's social media site Instagram, a product used by the gunman.

=== June ===
- June 21 – Shortly after Louisiana passed a bill into law that makes Louisiana the first state to mandate the Ten Commandments in every public school classroom, Lieutenant Governor Dan Patrick stated that he would pass a similar bill requiring the Ten Commandments in schools in the next legislative session, known as Senate Bill 1515. He criticized Speaker of the Texas House of Representatives Dade Phelan for failing to put the bill to a vote on the floor in the last legislative session on Twitter.
- June 28 – The Supreme Court of Texas upholds Senate Bill 14 of the 88th Texas Legislature, which prohibits doctors from prescribing gender-affirming care to transgender minors.

=== July ===
- July 8 – Effects of Hurricane Beryl in Texas: Three people are killed in Houston, Texas, as Hurricane Beryl makes landfall in Texas as a Category 1 hurricane.
- July 25 – Ismael "El Mayo" Zambada, leader of Mexico's Sinaloa Cartel, and Joaquín Guzmán López, son of Joaquín "El Chapo" Guzmán, are arrested by US Federal Agents shortly after landing at a private airfield outside El Paso.

=== October ===
- October 13 – SpaceX completes its fifth test flight of the Starship spacecraft, successfully catching the rocket booster with the arms of the launch tower at Starbase, and with the spacecraft landing in the Indian Ocean.
- October 20 – Four people are killed when a helicopter crashes into a radio tower in Houston.

=== December ===
- December 26 – Tornado outbreak of December 26–29, 2024

== See also ==
- 2024 in the United States
