= Lorraine Birabil =

American attorney and politician

Member of the Texas House of Representatives from the 100th district
- In office January 28, 2020 – January 12, 2021
- Preceded by: Eric Johnson
- Succeeded by: Jasmine Crockett

Personal details
- Born: North Texas, U.S.
- Party: Democratic
- Education: University of North Texas (BS, BA); Texas A&M University (JD)

Lorraine Birabil is an American attorney and politician who served briefly as a member of the Texas House of Representatives from the 100th district.

== Early life and education ==
Born and raised in North Texas, Birabil earned a Bachelor of Science in biology and Bachelor of Arts in political science from the University of North Texas. She then earned a Juris Doctor from the Texas A&M University School of Law.

== Career ==
A Democrat, she was elected to the House in a 2019–20 special election, succeeding Eric Johnson, who had been elected mayor of Dallas. In the July 2020 Democratic primary for a full term in the Texas House of Representatives, Birabil was narrowly defeated by Jasmine Crockett. She left office in January 2021 and declined to run again when Crockett vacated the seat to run for Congress.
