= Venton Jones =

American politician

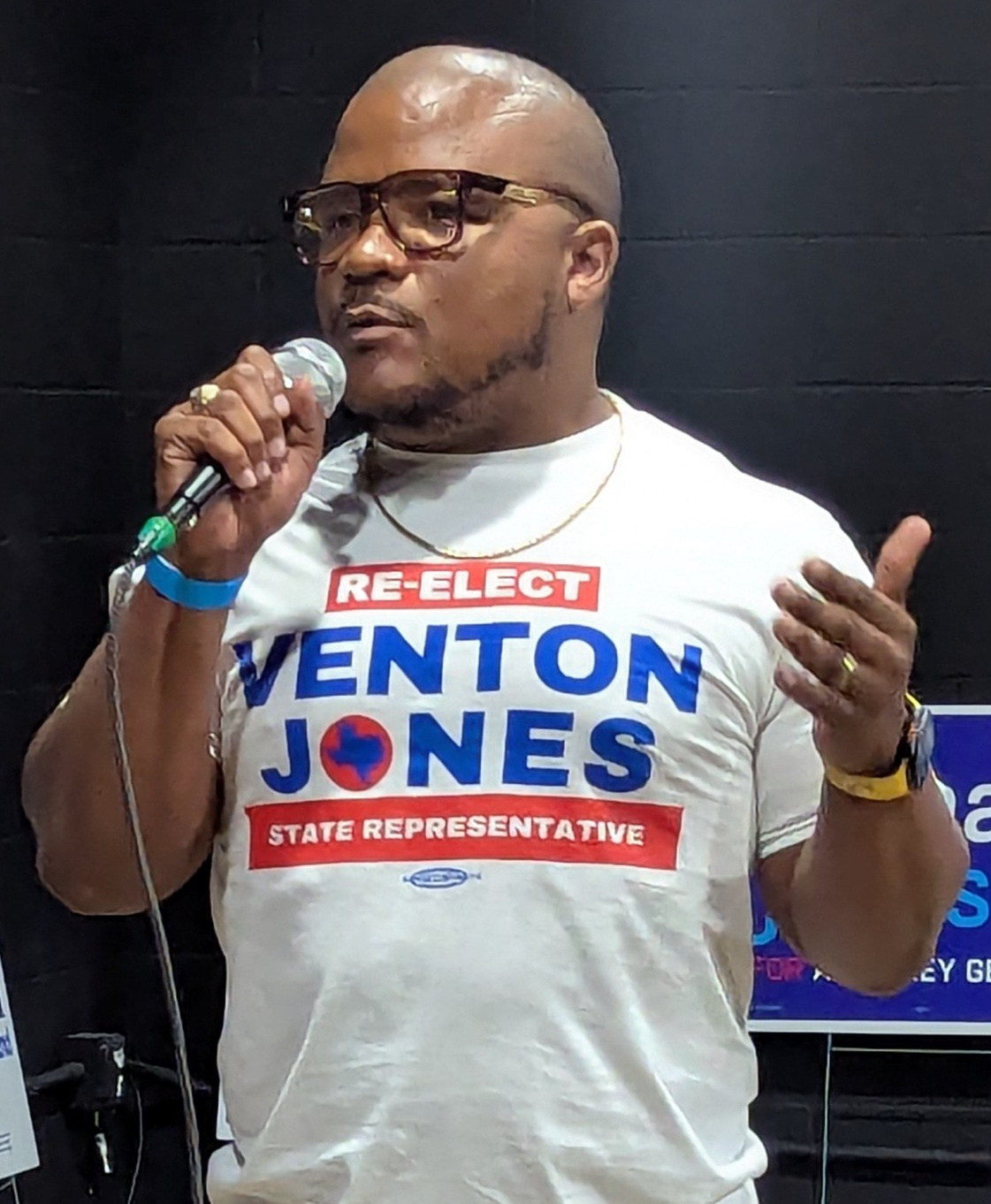
- Jones in 2026

Member of the Texas House of Representatives from the 100th district
- Incumbent
- Assumed office January 10, 2023
- Preceded by: Jasmine Crockett

Personal details
- Born: Dallas, Texas, U.S.
- Party: Democratic
- Education: Texas A&M University (BS); University of Texas, Arlington (MS)
- Website: Campaign website

Venton C. Jones Jr. is an American politician and non-profit CEO serving as the representative for the Texas State House's 100th district since 2023. Known for his advocacy for black gay men and those with HIV, he was elected to the Texas House of Representatives in 2022 to represent the central Dallas County district. A member of the Democratic Party, Jones is the first HIV-positive member of the Texas Legislature.

== Early life and education ==
Jones was born and raised in Dallas, Texas. He received his Bachelor of Science degree in Community Health at Texas A&M University and his Master of Science degree in Health Care Administration form the University of Texas at Arlington.

== Career ==
After graduating, Jones worked as the Dallas team leader for United Black Ellument, an HIV prevention and intervention project. In 2010, Jones began to work as the communications and education director at the National Black Gay Men's Advocacy Coalition. A year later, in 2011, President Obama officially recognized him for his efforts in HIV and public health advocacy.

== Texas House of Representatives ==
Jones launched his campaign for the Texas House after incumbent state legislator Jasmine Crockett announced that she would run for the Texas 30th Congressional district. In March, 2022, Jones defeated Daniel Clayton and Marquis Hawkins in the Democratic primary election along with Sandra Crenshaw. In May 2022, Jones defeated Crenshaw in the Democratic runoff election. In November 2022, Jones defeated Joe Roberts in the general election, winning 85 percent of the votes. He assumed office in 2023.

In June 2023, Jones announced he would be running for reelection. After a winning a close primary with just over 50 percent of the votes, Jones ran unopposed in the general election.

In 2025, Jones was the author of a bill that would repeal the state law that banned "homosexual conduct". While the law was ruled unconstitutional by the United States Supreme Court decision in Lawrence v. Texas, the statute had remained in Texas code though it was unenforced. The bill narrowly passed the Texas House on a bipartisan vote, but failed to receive a vote in the state senate. Jones had introduced the same bill during the previous session as well, but it failed to reach a legislative deadline to make it to a floor vote.

=== Committee assignments ===
During the 89th legislative session, Jones served as Vice-Chair of the House Committee on Corrections and on the Appropriations Committee. He previously served on the Public Health Committee.

== Personal life ==
Soon after graduating university in 2006, Jones went on to graduate school. In 2025, on the first day of the legislative session Jones proposed to his partner, Gregory Scott Jr., on the floor of the Texas House of Representatives.
