= Dallas City Council =

City council; lawmaking body of Dallas, Texas, US

City Council of the City of Dallas

Type
- Type: Full-time Council-Manager
- Houses: Unicameral

Leadership
- Mayor: Eric Johnson since 2019
- Mayor pro tempore: Jesse Moreno since 2025
- Deputy Mayor pro tempore: Gay Donnell Willis since 2025

Structure
- Seats: 14
- Committees: List: Economic Development; Housing & Homelessness; Government Performance and Financial Management; Quality of Life; Arts and Culture; Public Safety and Criminal Justice; Transportation & Infrastructure; Environment & Sustainability; Workforce; Ad Hoc Legislative; Ad Hoc Judicial Nominations
- Length of term: 2 years, renewable thrice

Elections
- Voting system: Majoritarian by District
- Redistricting: Decennial

Meeting place

Website
- dallascityhall.com/government/Pages/city-council.aspx

Constitution
- City Codes City Council Rules

The Dallas City Council serves as the legislative body in the City of Dallas. It consists of 14 members. City council members are chosen by majority elections in each of fourteen districts. The city operates under a council-manager system of local governance.

== Current membership ==
The current members of the city council are:

District	Name	Took office	Committee Chairship	Party
1	Chad West	2019		Nonpartisan
2	Jesse Moreno†	2021		Nonpartisan
3	Zarin Gracey	2023		Nonpartisan
4	Maxie Johnson	2025		Nonpartisan
5	Jaime Resendez	2019		Nonpartisan
6	Laura Cadena	2025		Nonpartisan
7	Adam Bazaldua	2019		Nonpartisan
8	Lorie Blair	2025		Nonpartisan
9	Paula Blackmon	2019		Nonpartisan
10	Kathy Stewart	2023	Parks, Trails and the Environment	Nonpartisan
11	Bill Roth	2025		Nonpartisan
12	Cara Mendelsohn	2019	Government Performance and Financial Management	Nonpartisan
13	Gay Donnell Willis‡	2021		Nonpartisan
14	Paul E. Ridley	2021		Nonpartisan

† Mayor pro tem

‡ Deputy Mayor pro tem
