= Jasmine Crockett =

American politician (born 1981)

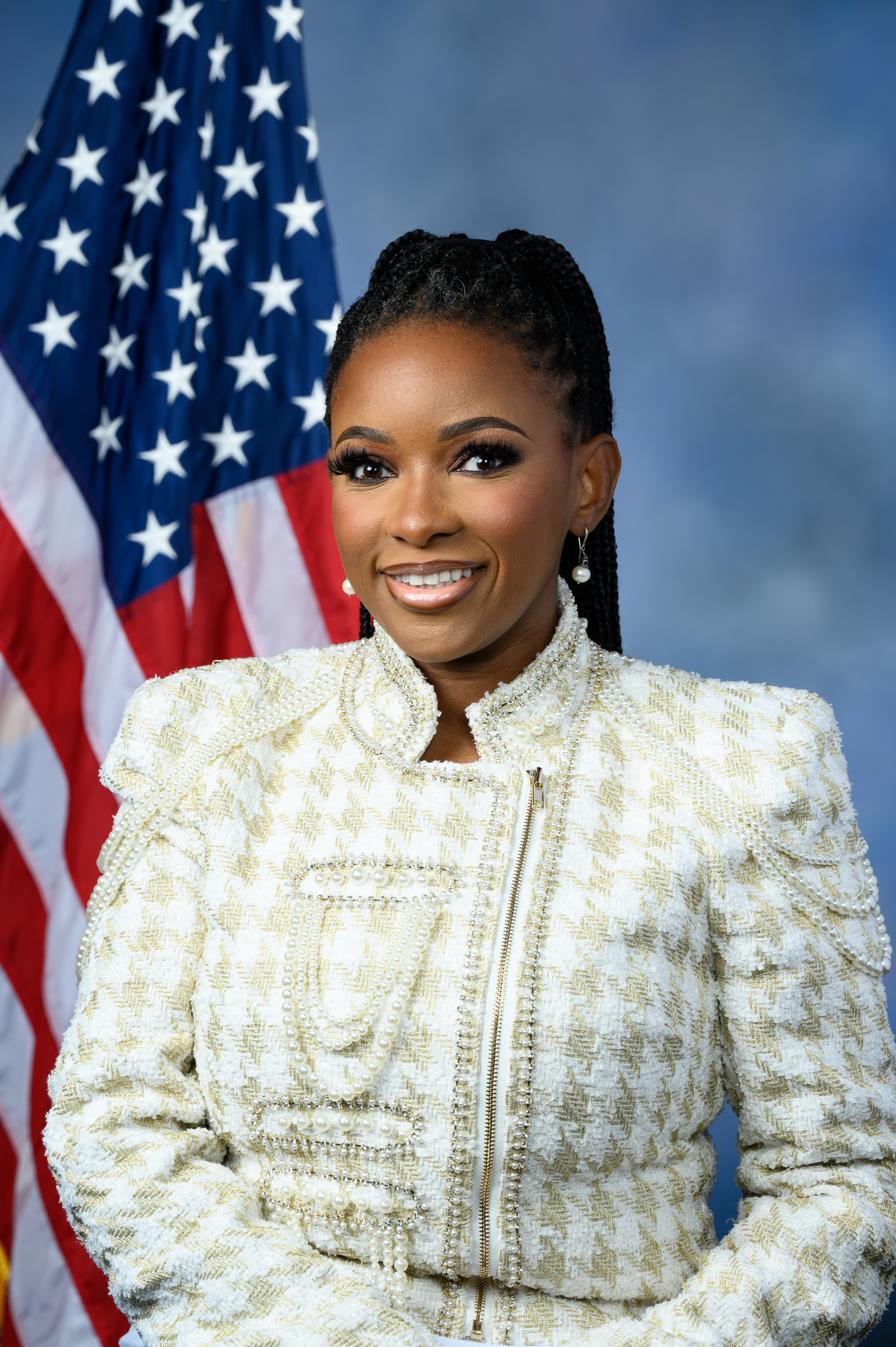
- Official portrait, 2022

Member of the U.S. House of Representatives from Texas's 30th district
- Incumbent
- Assumed office January 3, 2023
- Preceded by: Eddie Bernice Johnson

Member of the Texas House of Representatives from the 100th district
- In office January 12, 2021 – January 3, 2023
- Preceded by: Lorraine Birabil
- Succeeded by: Venton Jones

Personal details
- Born: Jasmine Felicia Crockett; March 29, 1981 (age 45) St. Louis, Missouri, U.S.
- Party: Democratic
- Education: Rhodes College (BA); Texas Southern University (attended); University of Houston (JD)
- Website: House website Campaign website
- Crockett's voice Crockett on the 2023 Allen, Texas, mall shooting Recorded May 11, 2023

Jasmine Felicia Crockett (born March 29, 1981) is an American politician serving as the U.S. representative for Texas's 30th congressional district since 2023. A member of the Democratic Party, she represented the 100th district in the Texas House of Representatives from 2021 to 2023.

Born in St. Louis, Missouri, Crockett graduated from Rhodes College with a Bachelor of Arts and from the University of Houston Law Center with a Juris Doctor. Afterward, she was a public defender in Bowie County, Texas, and later formed her own law firm. She was elected to the Texas House in 2020, succeeding Lorraine Birabil. In 2026, Crockett was a candidate in the U.S. Senate election in Texas, losing the Democratic primary to state representative James Talarico.

== Early life and education ==
Crockett was born in St. Louis to Rev. Joseph Crockett and Gwen Crockett. She attended Mary Institute and St. Louis Country Day School and Rosati-Kain Academy. She graduated in 2003 with a Bachelor of Arts in business administration from Rhodes College. She attended Thurgood Marshall School of Law at Texas Southern University prior to graduating from the University of Houston Law Center in 2006 with a Juris Doctor.

== Early career ==
From 2007 to 2010, Jasmine Crockett was an attorney for the Bowie County Public Defender's Office. In 2010, Crockett ran in the Bowie County district attorney race and lost. She was later elected to chair Bowie County's Democratic Party. In 2010, Crockett started her own law firm, Crockett Law PLLC, which operated until 2022. Her law firm represented victims of alleged police brutality.

== Texas House of Representatives (2021–2023) ==
In 2019, after Eric Johnson vacated his seat in the Texas House to become mayor of Dallas, a special election was held on November 5 with a runoff on January 28, 2020, for the remainder of his term. Lorraine Birabil won. Crockett challenged Birabil in the 2020 Democratic primary. She narrowly defeated Birabil in a primary runoff, advancing to the November 2020 general election, which she won unopposed. She assumed office in January 2021.

In the summer of 2021, Democrats in the Texas House of Representatives, including Crockett, organized a quorum-bust in an attempt to stop the passage of legislation they saw as restricting voting rights in the state. These representatives flew to Washington, D.C. to lobby the United States Senate to pass the John Lewis Voting Rights Act and the For the People Act. Crockett supported maintaining the quorum break, but she returned to the state once quorum was reestablished and the legislation stalled in the Senate.

Three bills she co-authored became law. These included legislation that eliminated or had the effect of eliminating certain in-court fees for recently incarcerated persons and also criminalized financial abuse of the elderly.

== U.S. House of Representatives (2023–present) ==
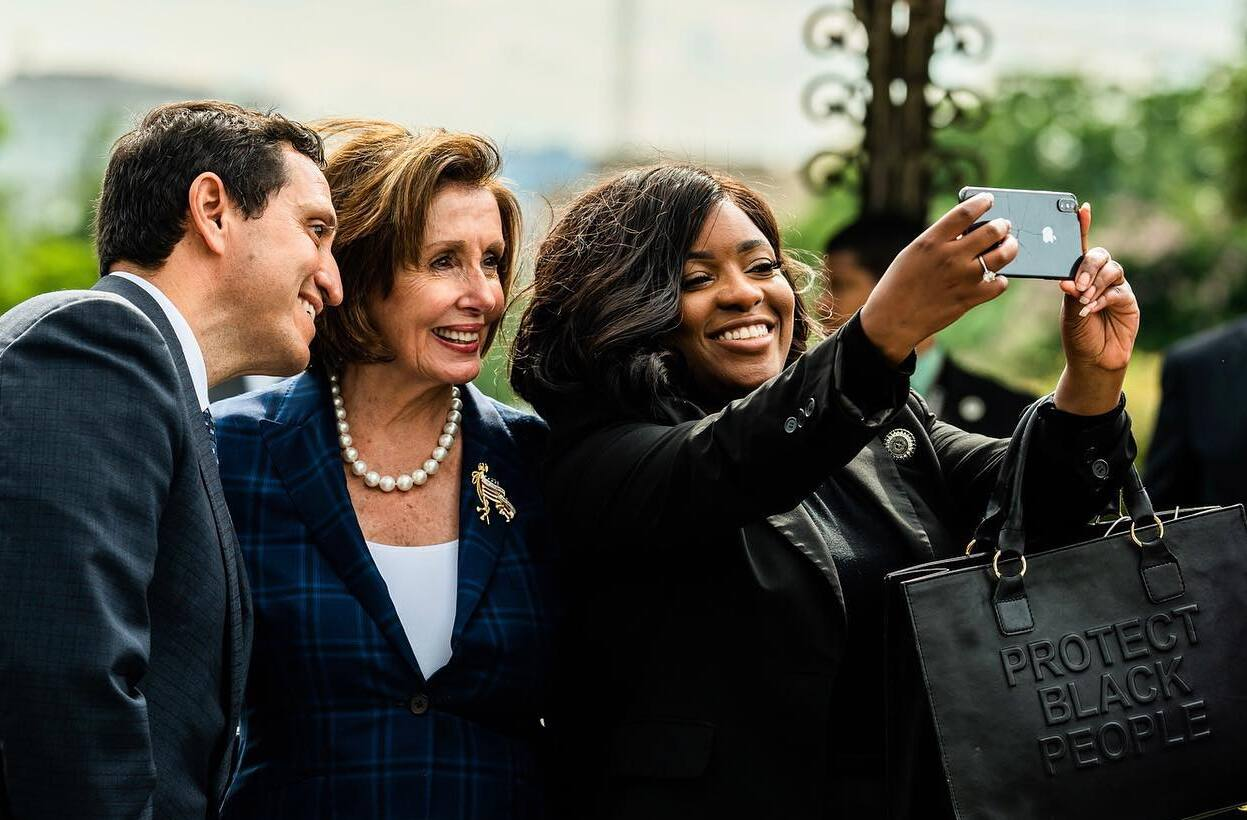
Texas State Representative Trey Martinez Fischer, U.S. House speaker Nancy Pelosi, and Crockett in 2021

=== Elections ===
==== 2022 ====
On November 20, 2021, incumbent representative Eddie Bernice Johnson of Texas's 30th congressional district announced she would not seek reelection in 2022. Four days later, Crockett declared her candidacy for the seat. Johnson simultaneously announced that she was backing Crockett. Crockett received $2 million in financial support from Super PACs aligned with the cryptocurrency industry, with Sam Bankman-Fried's Protect Our Future PAC, and Web3 Forward giving $1 million each in support of her campaign. In the Democratic primary election, Crockett and Jane Hope Hamilton, an aide to U.S. representative Marc Veasey, advanced to a runoff election, which Crockett won. She then won the general election on November 8.

=== Tenure ===
Early in her term, Crockett served as the representative for the 35 newly-elected Democratic members and acted as a liaison between them and the House Democratic leadership. Through the Infrastructure Investment and Jobs Act signed by President Joe Biden, Crockett secured $510,000 in federal funding for infrastructure projects in Glenn Heights.

Crockett has sponsored and co-sponsored legislation aimed at legalizing fentanyl testing strips, and offering additional employment protections for military spouses. She also introduced legislation to improve access to rural housing assistance and has supported proposals affecting Texas’s independent power grid.

In a 2023 impeachment hearing for President Joe Biden, Crockett accused fellow Congresswoman Marjorie Taylor Greene and other Republicans of hypocrisy. She claimed that those launching the impeachment inquiry, and those who brought forth charges against Biden, were ignoring documented evidence of President Donald Trump's own criminal offenses; she displayed photos from the FBI search of Mar-a-Lago, depicting Trump storing classified documents inside a bathroom, to which she remarked, "These are our national secrets—looks like in the shitter to me."

Crockett also served as a national co-chair of the 2024 Harris–Walz campaign.

In 2025, she was appointed to the House Judiciary Committee.

She later referred to Texas Governor Greg Abbott as "Governor Hot Wheels" and a "Hot Ass Mess" during a speech at a Human Rights Campaign event. Crockett denied that the comment had to do with Abbott's condition, instead saying that it referenced the "planes, trains, and automobiles" he used to transfer migrants to Democratic communities. Representative Randy Weber filed a resolution to censure her.

=== Caucus memberships ===
- Black Maternal Health Caucus
- Congressional Black Caucus
- Congressional Equality Caucus
- Congressional Progressive Caucus
- Congressional Caucus for the Equal Rights Amendment
- Congressional Ukraine Caucus
- Future Forum

=== Committee assignments ===
Current

- Committee on the Judiciary (2025–present)
  - Subcommittee on Oversight (ranking member)
- Committee on Oversight and Government Reform (2023–present; vice ranking member, 2025–present)
  - Subcommittee on Delivering on Government Efficiency (2025–present)
  - Subcommittee on Government Operations and the Federal Workforce (2023–2025)

Past

- Committee on Agriculture (2023–2025)
  - Subcommittee on Commodity Markets, Digital Assets, and Rural Development
  - Subcommittee on General Farm Commodities, Risk Management, and Credit
  - Subcommittee on Nutrition, Foreign Agriculture, and Horticulture
- Select Subcommittee on the Weaponization of the Federal Government (2023–2025)

== 2026 U.S. Senate election in Texas ==
In December 2025, Crockett announced her bid for U.S. Senate in Texas in the 2026 election. In the Democratic primary, she faced state representative James Talarico and perennial candidate Ahmad Hassan. In February 2026, Crockett was criticized for seemingly using AI in a Super Bowl campaign advertisement, to generate a crowd of supporters. The criticism was first raised by Democratic strategist Keith Edwards, who claimed to have found a SynthID watermark in the ad, indicating the use of Google Gemini. Crockett's team did not confirm or deny the allegations. Former Vice President Kamala Harris endorsed Crockett.

On March 3, 2026, she lost the Texas Senate Democratic primary to Talarico. After her concession, Crockett released a statement calling for unity: "Texas is primed to turn blue and we must remain united because this is bigger than any one person. This is about the future of all 30 million Texans and getting America back on track. With the primary behind us, Democrats must rally around our nominees and win."

== Political positions ==
Crockett has been labeled as a progressive Democrat; however, she has personally distanced herself from the label, calling her positions "common sense".

=== Abortion ===
Crockett has voted against rescinding Title IX protections, limits on abortion-related coverage for service members, and funding for anti-abortion centers.

=== Congressional reform ===
Crockett supports reform to the current filibuster rules in the Senate, including creating carve-outs for certain categories of legislation like voting rights.

=== Criminal justice ===
As a Texas state representative, Crockett proposed a law that would allow people facing nonviolent misdemeanors to receive citations instead of jail time. She also filed bills that she said would minimize police contact with Black and brown people and save them from "unreasonable uses of force".

=== Economy ===
Crockett supports raising the national minimum wage of $7.25. She supported the GENIUS Act, a cryptocurrency regulation bill that "gave the industry long-sought legitimacy".

=== Gun rights ===
Crockett owns a firearm, is licensed to carry, and supports a ban on assault weapons. She has said that private individuals owning assault weapons is "the equivalent of some of these people having a cannon... People literally have almost no chance of surviving when some of these weapons are used."

=== Immigration and ICE enforcement ===
In 2026, Crockett voted against funding the Department of Homeland Security and voiced support for impeaching Homeland Security Secretary Kristi Noem.

=== Israeli–Palestinian conflict ===
Crockett has faced criticism for voting in support of funding military aid to Israel and for her trip to Israel with the American Israel Public Affairs Committee (AIPAC) and the Israel Defense Forces during her first term.

=== Supreme Court ===
Crockett supports expanding the number of justices on the court and the adoption of an enforceable code of ethics for the justices.

=== Voting rights ===
In 2023, Crockett reintroduced the Democracy Restoration Act in the house, which would restore voting rights to millions of convicts who have been released from prison. Crockett said that only federal legislation can prevent millions of Texans from being disenfranchised and warned the changes could affect upcoming midterm elections, including Governor Abbott's re-election race.

== Electoral history ==
2020 Texas's 100th state house district Democratic primary
Party	Candidate	Votes	%
Democratic	Lorraine Birabil (incumbent)	4,566	29.3
Democratic	Jasmine Crockett	4,030	25.9
Democratic	Sandra Crenshaw	2,944	18.9
Democratic	Daniel Davis Clayton	1,665	10.9
Democratic	James Armstrong III	1,315	8.5
Democratic	Paul Stafford	1,046	6.7
Total votes		15,566	100.0

2020 Texas's 100th state house district Democratic primary runoff
Party	Candidate	Votes	%
Democratic	Jasmine Crockett	5,171	50.4
Democratic	Lorraine Birabil (incumbent)	5,081	49.6
Total votes		10,252	100.0

2020 Texas's 100th state house district election
Party	Candidate	Votes	%
Democratic	Jasmine Crockett	45,550	100.0
Total votes		45,550	100.0

2022 Texas's 30th congressional district Democratic primary
Party	Candidate	Votes	%
Democratic	Jasmine Crockett	26,798	48.5
Democratic	Jane Hope Hamilton	9,436	17.1
Democratic	Keisha Williams-Lankford	4,323	7.8
Democratic	Barbara Mallory Caraway	4,277	7.7
Democratic	Abel Mulugheta	3,284	5.9
Democratic	Roy Williams	2,746	5.0
Democratic	Vonciel Hill	1,886	3.4
Democratic	Jessica Mason	1,858	3.4
Democratic	Arthur Dixon	677	1.2
Total votes		55,285	100.0

2022 Texas's 30th congressional district Democratic primary runoff
Party	Candidate	Votes	%
Democratic	Jasmine Crockett	17,462	60.6
Democratic	Jane Hope Hamilton	11,369	39.4
Total votes		28,831	100.0

2022 Texas's 30th congressional district election
Party	Candidate	Votes	%
Democratic	Jasmine Crockett	134,876	74.72
Republican	James Rodgers	39,209	21.72
Independent	Zachariah Manning	3,820	2.12
Libertarian	Phil Gray	1,870	1.04
Write-in	Debbie Walker	738	0.41
Total votes		180,513	100.0

2024 Texas's 30th congressional district Democratic primary
Party	Candidate	Votes	%
Democratic	Jasmine Crockett	43,059	91.5
Democratic	Jarred Davis	3,982	8.5
Total votes		47,041	100.0

2024 Texas's 30th congressional district election
Party	Candidate	Votes	%
Democratic	Jasmine Crockett	197,650	84.9
Libertarian	Jrmar Jefferson	35,175	15.1
Total votes		232,825	100.0

2026 Texas Democratic US Senate primary
Party	Candidate	Votes	%
Democratic	James Talarico	1,216,412	52.4
Democratic	Jasmine Crockett	1,071,900	46.2
Democratic	Ahmad Hassan	30,875	1.3
Total votes		2,319,187	100.0

== Personal life ==
Crockett is a Baptist Christian and a member of the Friendship-West Baptist Church.

She is also a member of the Delta Sigma Theta Sorority, Inc.

== See also ==
- Black women in American politics
- List of African-American United States representatives
- List of African-American United States Senate candidates
- Women in the United States House of Representatives

U.S. House of Representatives
Preceded by Eddie Bernice Johnson	Member of the U.S. House of Representatives from Texas's 30th congressional district 2023–present	Incumbent
U.S. order of precedence (ceremonial)
Preceded by Eli Crane	United States representatives by seniority 301st	Succeeded by Don Davis
