= Disappearance of Cynthia Bah-Traore =

February 2021 disappeared American woman

Cynthia Martyna Bah-Traore
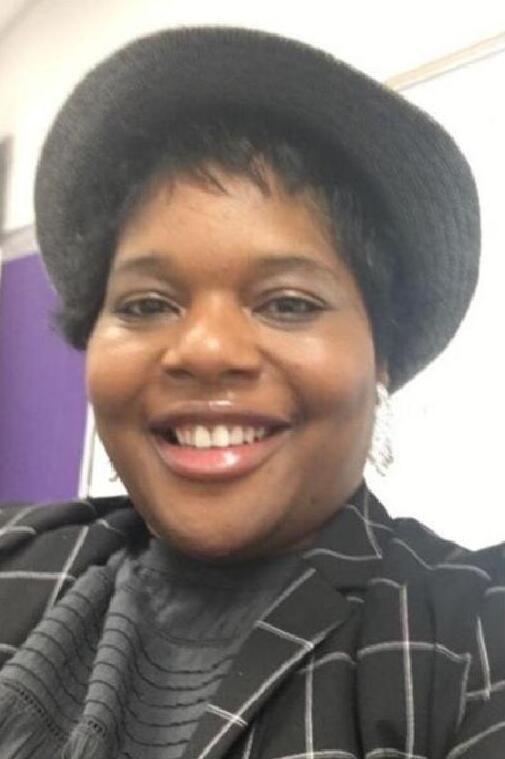
- Born: July 4, 1981
- Disappeared: February 3, 2021; Grandview, Texas, U.S.
- Status: Missing for 5 years, 5 months and 7 days
- Other name: Cynthia Martyna Alvoid
- Children: 2

Cynthia Martyna Bah-Traore (nee Alvoid) is an American woman who disappeared on the evening of February 3, 2021. Her whereabouts remain unknown. She was last seen on a Shell Gas station's surveillance footage located at 1003 E Criner St. Grandview, Texas 76050. Bah-Traore was last seen wearing a blue long-sleeve shirt, black pants, gray with white shoes, and carrying a red purse with plaid markings. She was driving a Mazda CX-5 Texas license plate NMJ 3883. Her phone was reportedly discovered at the gas station. Cynthia's son reported that his mother never returned home after running errands. At the time of her disappearance, Bah-Traore was living in Crowley, Texas, and her case is being investigated by the Crowley Police Department. There is also an FBI agent assigned to the case.

According to police report records, on February 16, her vehicle was found abandoned along Interstate 35, near mile marker 335 in Waco, Texas, with no sign of Bah-Traore. The Find Cynthia Coalition was formed to bring awareness about Bah-Traore's disappearance and help find her. The Coalition created a website: www.findcynthia.com. As of February 2024, the Coalition is offering a $50,000 reward for information that leads to Cynthia's return.

In January 2022, Access Hollywood's Zuri Hall featured a story about the disappearance of Bah-Traore. Her mother told Access Hollywood: "I miss my daughter. I really can't process it." She said: "Whoever parked her car knows where Cynthia is. I'm hoping someone will come forward and tell us more information." The program partnered with the Black and Missing Foundation to highlight her case.

On June 14, 2024, journalist Roland Martin covered Bah-Traore's disappearance on his show Unfiltered. Martin highlighted the suspicious circumstances of Bah-Traore's disappearance, law enforcement's handling of the case, and the $50,000 reward. Several true crime podcasts have covered the disappearance. Black Girl Gone Podcast did a two-part series about her in February/March 2024. Bah-Traore also recorded podcasts before her disappearance.

== See also ==
- List of people who disappeared mysteriously (2000–present)
