= Electoral reform in Texas =

U.S. state electoral reform

Electoral reform in Texas refers to efforts to change the voting and election laws in the State of Texas.

In 2001, State Representative Ron Wilson proposed lowering the state's voting age to 14, but the proposal did not become law.

The city of Amarillo adopted cumulative voting systems, in which voters can cast one vote per seat, in 2002, allowing for broader representation on the local school boards.

In 2003, some Democratic state legislators were found to be crossing into Oklahoma to avoid voting on a plan that would redraw electoral districts in favor of Republicans. This same tactic would be utilized by Democrats again in 2021 by going to Washington D.C. to avoid giving Republicans a quorum to pass a Republican-backed voting rights reform bill. Ultimately, Republicans would pass the bill in August, 2021.

In 2017, HB 496, a bill to enact the National Popular Vote Interstate Compact, was introduced to the Texas State Legislature, but the bill died in committee without a hearing.

The Texas Voter Choice Act, introduced in 2017, was an attempt to reform Texas electoral law. Its proponents sought to make the ballot more accessible to third-party and independent candidates by making signature, filing and financial requirements more lenient.

== 2021 Reforms ==
=== SB 1 ===
Following the record turnout of the 2020 election, Texas state legislators moved to change the state's election laws. At start of the 87th Legislative session, over 53 bills restricting access to voting had been introduced in Texas. Ultimately, SB 1 would become the dominant bill for reforming elections. The bill saw significant pushback from progressive groups, including the ACLU of Texas which opposed the bill's passage. Many groups opposed to the bill believed it would intimidate and suppress minority voters and other groups who had been historically discriminated against. Republicans argued that the bill would restore faith in the election system following President Donald Trump's unfounded claims of widespread fraud in the 2020 election.

==== Provisions ====
- Reforms the power and duties of poll watchers
  - Rejecting a poll watcher from watching is now a crime
  - Poll watchers now have the authority to freely move around a voting facility
  - Poll watchers must complete a course and present certification before appearing for their duties
- Altering opportunities to vote
  - Restrictions on drive-thru voting and how long polling places can be kept open
  - Early voting sites must be open for at least nine hours minimum, starting no earlier than 6 AM and no later than 10 PM
  - Mandating that employers allow employees to vote early or on election day
- Mail-In Voting
  - A ban on drop boxes for mail ballots
  - Requirements to vote by mail include a driver's license, election identification certificate, or Social Security number that matches the one on file
  - A signature that can be reconciled with other on-file signatures

Unable to pass the bill before the end of the regular session, due to Democrats leaving to create an absence of a quorum, Texas Governor Greg Abbott called for a special session to begin July 8. Utilizing the same tactic as during the regular session, Democrats again denied a quorum by going to Washington D.C. However, Republicans would ultimately pass the bill in August, 2021. On 7 September 2021, Governor Abbott signed SB 1 into law.

== See also ==
- Electoral reform in the United States
