= Texas's 100th House of Representatives district =

American legislative district

Texas's 100th State House of Representatives district
Representative
Venton Jones; D–Dallas
- Demographics: 11.1% White; 37.4% Black; 49.9% Hispanic; 1.8% Asian
- Population (2020) • Voting age: 184,691; 136,545

The Texas House of Representatives' 100th District represents a portion of the city of Dallas, in central Dallas County. The district includes part of downtown Dallas.

== List of notable representatives ==
- Eric Johnson, 2010–2019
- Jasmine Crockett, 2021–2023
- Venton Jones, 2023–present
