= History of Texas (1845–1860) =

In 1845, the Republic of Texas was annexed to the United States of America, becoming the 28th U.S. state. Border disputes between the new state and Mexico, which had never recognized Texas independence and still considered the area a renegade Mexican state, led to the Mexican–American War (1846–1848). When the war concluded, Mexico relinquished its claim on Texas, as well as other regions in what is now the southwestern United States. Texas' annexation as a state that tolerated slavery had caused tension in the United States among slave states and those that did not allow slavery. The tension was partially defused with the Compromise of 1850, in which Texas ceded some of its territory to the federal government to become non-slave-owning areas but gained El Paso.

== Annexation ==
The Republic of Texas had formed in 1836, after breaking away from Mexico in the Texas Revolution. The following year, an ambassador from Texas approached the United States about the possibility of becoming an American state. Fearing a war with Mexico, which did not recognize Texas independence, the United States declined the offer. In 1844, James K. Polk was elected the United States president after promising to annex Texas. Before he assumed office, the outgoing president, John Tyler, entered negotiations with Texas. On February 26, 1845, six days before Polk took office, the U.S. Congress approved the annexation. The Texas legislature approved annexation in July 1845 and constructed a state constitution. In October, Texas residents approved the annexation and the new constitution, and Texas was officially inducted into the United States on December 29, 1845.

== Constitution of 1845 ==
The Constitution of 1845 is Texas' first state constitution. It is created with the influence of the Constitution of Louisiana and the previous Constitution of the Republic of Texas. Notable members such as José Antonio Navarro helped write the Constitution of 1845, which helped ensure Tejanos' voting rights. Due to the heavy influences of Jacksonian beliefs, the Constitution greatly discouraged the creation of companies and outright banning of banks. It has numerous policies on agriculture and included protection of homesteads. With Texas being a slave state, the Constitution has regulations on freeing slaves, as it states that only with special permission from the state government can an African American slave be free. Daniel Webster thought it to be the best state constitution of his time for its simplicity, and it is still considered to be the most popular Texas Constitution. The only amendment to this constitution was about government offices being elected by the people, not appointed by other government officers, in 1850. The Constitution also supported public education, as 10% of all state taxes are directed to the funding of public schools.

== Mexican–American War ==
The Mexican-American War Map

When Texas was annexed, Mexico broke diplomatic relations with the United States. The annexation bill did not specifically define the boundaries of Texas. The former republic claimed the Rio Grande as its southern border, while Mexican authorities had always considered the Nueces River, situated further north, to be the boundary of Mexican Texas. The United States sent John Slidell to negotiate with the Mexican government, offering $25 million ($930,288,462 today) to set the Texas border at the Rio Grande and to purchase Mexico's provinces of Alta California and Santa Fe de Nuevo México. Popular sentiment in Mexico was against any sale, and the army deposed President José Joaquín de Herrera when he appeared inclined to negotiate with Slidell.

The United States positioned troops along the Rio Grande. On April 25, 1846, in an event known as the Thornton Affair, a large contingent of Mexican cavalry attacked an American patrol in the area between the Rio Grande and the Nueces, killing 16 Americans. On May 3, Mexican troops initiated the siege of Fort Texas, bombarding a makeshift American fort along the Rio Grande. On May 8, Zachary Taylor led 2,500 U.S. troops to relieve the fort. He was intercepted by Mexican troops, leading to the Battle of Palo Alto. Mexican troops retreated a short distance to regroup, and the following day the two sides fought fiercely in the Battle of Resaca de la Palma. The U.S. cavalry captured the Mexican artillery, and the Mexican soldiers retreated.

The United States officially declared war against Mexico on May 13. Mexico declared war against the U.S. on July 7. Throughout the official hostilities, the United States maintained two fronts—one in the Mexican interior south of the Rio Grande, and one in California. There was no further fighting in Texas. Texas Rangers were also used as scouts and guerilla fighters. Some Rangers were also noted to have committed numerous criminal acts, such as theft, vandalism, and civilian massacres. The Rangers were also noted to be part of the attacking force on taking Independence Hill.

The war ended on February 2, 1848, with the signing of the Treaty of Guadalupe Hidalgo. Mexico ceded claims to Texas, and the border was set at the Rio Grande.

== Compromise of 1850 ==
The expansion of the United States after the Mexican–American War led to tensions between the slave and free states as to how to maintain the balance between the opposing viewpoints. The Wilmot Proviso, a bill that would have all of the newly seized territories be considered slave-free areas, caused more tension between both sides when it was first sent to Congress and was then blocked by Southern senators. Texas had been admitted to the United States as a slave state, yet Texas claimed territory north of the 36°30' demarcation line for slavery set by the Missouri Compromise. According to the annexation agreement, if Texas were to be subdivided into multiple states, those north of the compromise line would become free states. Following the conclusion of the Mexican–American War, Texas also tried to exert control over much of New Mexico.

To prevent some states from seceding from the United States, Congress passed the Compromise of 1850. A voting session appeared for the acceptance of the Compromise of 1850 by the state of Texas and was passed by a three-to-one majority vote. Texas gave up much of the western territories it had claimed in exchange for $10 million to pay off previous debts.

== Settlement ==
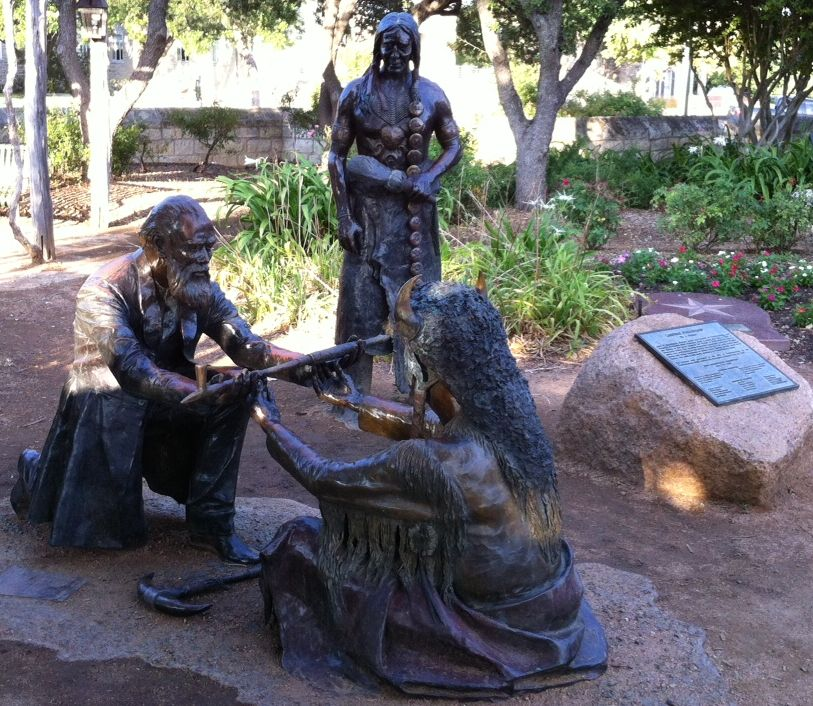
Statue of the Meusebach-Comanche Treaty being completed.

Post-war Texas grew rapidly as migrants poured into the cotton lands of the state. Texas was a prime location for agricultural immigration, due to its numerous rivers and rich soil. Due to high amounts of immigration, the settled population of Texas rose to nearly 147,000 in 1847. The settled population eventually rose to 600,000 in 1860. San Antonio became one of the largest cities in Texas during this time.

=== German Immigration ===
German immigrants started to arrive in the early 1840s because of economic, social, and political conditions in their states. In 1842, German nobles organized the Adelsverein, banding together to buy land in central Texas to enable German settlement. The Revolutions of 1848 acted as another catalyst for so many immigrants that they became known as the "Forty-Eighters." Many were educated artisans and businessmen. The Meusebach-Comanche Treaty of 1847 allowed German settlers to travel through Native American territory without being harmed. Germans continued to arrive in considerable numbers until 1890.

=== Czech Immigration ===
The first Czech immigrants started their journey to Texas on August 19, 1851, headed by Jozef Šilar. The rich farmland of Central Texas attracted the Czech immigrants. The counties of Austin, Fayette, Lavaca, and Washington had early Czech settlements. The Czech-American communities are characterized by a strong sense of community and social clubs were a dominant theme of Czech-American life in Texas. By 1865, the Czech population numbered 700 and climbed to over 60,000 Czech-Americans by 1940.

=== Agricultural Areas ===
With their investments in cotton cultivation, Texas planters imported enslaved blacks from the earliest years of settlement. During 1860, the population of African American slaves rose to 169,000. They established cotton plantations mostly in the eastern part of the state, where labor was done by enslaved African Americans. The central area of the state had more subsistence farmers. Wheat plantations were also prevalent in a good portion of East, West, and all of Northern Texas. The wheat farms also had a low amount of African American slaves compared to the cotton plantations.

== Development ==
- The first railroad built in Texas is called the Harrisburg Railroad and opened for business in 1853.
- In 1854, the Texas and Red River telegraph services were the first telegraph offices to open in Texas.
- The Texas cotton industry in 1859 increased production by seven times compared to 1849, as 58,073 bales increased to 431,645 bales.
- In the state legislation, two classes of roads were provided in 1848. The first class has a width of 30 feet and a causeway of 15 feet width. The second class has a width of 20 feet and a causeway of 12 feet width.
- The agricultural economy was stifled due to poor road infrastructure, which slowed down trade.
- An attempt at a transcontinental railroad called the Mississippi and Pacific Railroad was enacted in 1853, but due to the rejection of the first contractors and lacking other bidders, the project was never finished.
- Cotton plantation owners mainly used rivers to transport their goods

== Indian wars ==
In the late 1850s, settlers continued to push west and north, and by 1856 had begun settling parts of the Comancheria in large numbers. Angry at the loss of their traditional hunting grounds, several bands of Comanche conducted raids on Texas settlers.

=== Fort Life ===
To protect settlers from Native American attacks, United States soldiers built forts to guard the roads between El Paso to San Antonio. The soldiers would also have their family live in the fort or nearby, with the wives and children doing chores, and would sometimes take their sons on scouting missions.

=== Texas Rangers ===
Texas Rangers were hired for the protection of Texas settlements against Native American Raids. The Callahan expedition of 1855 tried to hunt down a group of Lipan Apaches warriors that allegedly raided multiple Texas settlements, which led to a confrontation between the Texas Rangers and Lipan Apaches warriors with the support of Mexican soldiers. In an effort to stop the violence and subdue the Comanche, in 1858 the Texas Rangers paired with members of the Tonkawa tribe—traditionally, enemies of the Comanche—for the Antelope Hills Expedition. Federal law promised Indian tribes safety in Indian Territory, located just north of Texas. Nevertheless, the Rangers crossed into Indian Territory and attacked a Comanche village at the Battle of Little Robe Creek. This was the first time any American forces had penetrated to the heart of the Comancheria, attacked Comanche villages with impunity, and successfully made it home. The expedition exhausted the annual Texas defense budget, and the governor disbanded the Rangers.

== Secession ==
The Southern States' fear of a Republican president changing the slavery policy of the union led to growing support for secession. Familiarization with lower Southern Texas culture and the cotton economy of Texas in 1860 also allowed some German immigrants and Upper Southern Texans to support secession. Three factions had different views on the future of Texas and its relation to the United States government. Some wanted to stay in the union, some wished to create a Southern confederation, and some wished to have Texas be a sovereign nation again. Some politicians, like Francis R. Lubbock, said that Texas was eligible to secede if Lincoln became president, while others, such as George W. Smyth, said that Texas could only secede if the US government made any policies that harmed the state. After Lincoln won the presidential election, a convention of delegates from multiple counties across Texas debated about seceding from the United States of America in late 1860.

=== Pro-Unionists ===
- Sam Houston: Texas Senator, Republic of Texas Ex-President
- Elisha Marshall Pease: Texas Governor

=== Pro-Secessionists ===
- David G. Burnet: Republic of Texas Ex-President
- Francis R. Lubbock: Ex-Lieutenant Governor of Texas
- Ashbel Smith: Republic of Texas Ex-Secretary of State
- George W. Smyth: Former Texas Congressman

== Sources ==
- T.R. Fehrenbach, Lone Star: A History of Texas and Texans (Cambridge: Da Capo Press, 2000)
