= List of mayors of Corpus Christi, Texas =

The following is a list of mayors of Corpus Christi, Texas. The current mayor is Paulette Guajardo.

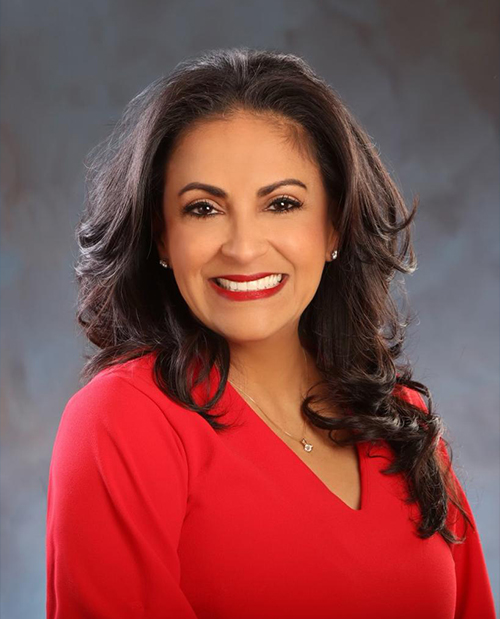
Current mayor Paulette Guajardo

Name	Term
Benjamin F. Neal	1852–1853
E. H. Winfield	1853 (Resigned)
C. R. Hopson	1853–1854 (Pro-tem)
Henry F. Berry	1854–1855
Benjamin F. Neal	1855–1856
Henry A. Maltby	1856–1857 (Resigned)
Cornelius Cahill	1857 (Pro-tem)
Henry W. Berry	1857 (abandoned office)
Ruben Holbein	1857–1860
Henry W. Berry	1860–1863
Dr. George W. Robertson	1863–1866
Weymon N. Staples	1866–1868
Nelson Plato	1868–1870
J. B. Mitchell	1870–1872
Perry Doddridge	1872–1875
Nelson Plato	1875–1876
William Headen	1876–1877
J. C. Russell	1877
John Marks Davenport Moore	1877–1880
John Bernard Murphy	1880–1884
George F. Evans	1884–1886
Cheston C. Heath	1886–1888
Henry Keller	1888–1892
Oscar C. Lovenskiold	1892–1902
H. H. Segrest	1902–1904 (Acting Mayor)
H. H. Segrest	1904–1908
Dan Reid	1908–1909 (Died in office)
W. H. Hull	1909–1910 (Pro-tem)
Clark Pease	1910–1913
Roy Miller	1913–1919
Gordon Boone	1919–1921
Dr. Perry Gl Lovenskiold	1921–1931
Edwin F. Flato	1931–1933
William Shaffer	1933–1935
Dr. H. R. Giles	1935–1937
A. C. McCaughan	1937–1945
Roy Self	1945–1946 (Resigned)
Robert T. Wilson	1946–1947 (Died in office)
Wesley Eli Seale	1947–1949
Leslie Wasserman	1949–1953
A. Albert Lichtenstein	1953–1954 (Resigned)
Ellroy King	1954 (Pro tem)
P. C. Callaway	1954–1955
Farrell D. Smith	1955–1959
Ellroy King	1959–1961
Ben F. McDonald	1961–1963
Dr. James L. Barnard	1963–1965
Dr. McIver Furman	1965–1967
Jack R. Blackmon	1967–1971
Ronnie Sizemore	1971–1973
Jason Luby	1973–1979
Luther Jones	1979–1987
Betty Turner	1987–1991
Mary Rhodes	1991–1997
Loyd Neal	1997–2005
Henry Garrett	2005–2009
Joe Adame	2009–2012
Nelda Martinez	2012–2016
Dan McQueen	2016–2017 (in office 37 days before resigning via Facebook)
Joe McComb	2017–2021
Paulette Guajardo	2021–present

The acting pro-tem, Gabe Lozano, finished out his term until 1979. (Luby resigned in order to run for Congress and city ordinance prohibited him from holding his position while running for another office)

== See also ==
- Timeline of Corpus Christi, Texas
