= Eric Johnson (Texas politician) =

Mayor of Dallas, Texas, United States (born 1975)

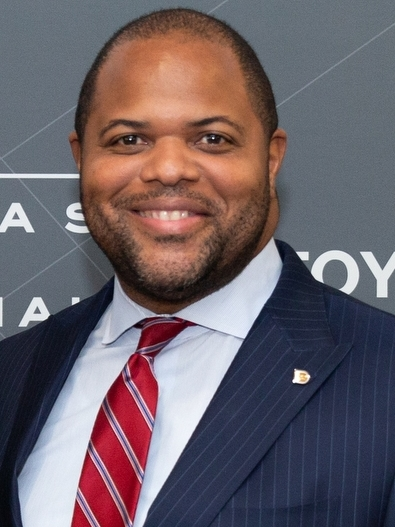

60th Mayor of Dallas
- Incumbent
- Assumed office June 17, 2019
- Preceded by: Mike Rawlings

Member of the Texas House of Representatives from the 100th district
- In office April 20, 2010 – June 17, 2019
- Preceded by: Terri Hodge
- Succeeded by: Lorraine Birabil

Personal details
- Born: Eric Lynn Johnson; October 10, 1975 (age 50) Dallas, Texas, U.S.
- Party: Democratic (before 2023); Republican (2023–present)
- Children: 3
- Education: Harvard University (BA); University of Pennsylvania (JD); Princeton University (MPA)

Eric Lynn Johnson (born October 10, 1975) is an American politician and attorney who has served as the 60th mayor of Dallas since 2019. A former Democrat, Johnson has been a member of the Republican Party since September 2023. Before his mayoral tenure, Johnson was a member of the Texas House of Representatives, where he represented the 100th district in the cities of Dallas and Mesquite.

== Early life and education ==
Johnson was born on October 10, 1975, in Dallas, Texas. He attended Dallas ISD schools until the second grade, when he received a scholarship to attend Greenhill School through the West Dallas Boys & Girls Club. Johnson graduated from Greenhill School in 1994.

Johnson went on to attend Harvard University and was a resident of Cabot House. He was initiated into Kappa Alpha Psi fraternity his second year and headed up the community service efforts of both that organization and the Harvard Black Students Association, which earned him both the John Lord O’Brian and Stride Rite scholarships from Harvard College for his commitment to community service.

The summer between his junior and senior year of college, Johnson studied public policy at the Graduate School of Public Policy at the University of California at Berkeley as part of the Public Policy and International Affairs (PPIA) Fellowship Program. While at Harvard, Johnson was involved with the Phillips Brooks House, Harvard's premier community service organization, where he served as the director of the Cambridge Youth Enrichment Program (CYEP), a summer program for the children who lived in the public housing projects in the city of Cambridge, Massachusetts. Johnson lived in the public housing project that he served for the duration of the summer.

After graduating from Harvard cum laude in 1998 with a degree in history, Johnson returned to Dallas to work as an investment banker with Donaldson, Lufkin & Jenrette, and then as an aide to state representative Yvonne Davis. After the 76th Texas Legislature adjourned in May 1999, he moved to New York City for three months to work as a graduate intern for the NAACP Legal Defense and Educational Fund, where he conducted research to support several of their desegregation lawsuits in the Deep South and also to combat the proposed elimination of remedial education on City University of New York system campuses.

Johnson earned a Juris Doctor degree from the University of Pennsylvania Law School, where he was a public-interest scholar and a member of the Journal of International Economic Law, and a Master of Public Affairs from the School of Public and International Affairs at Princeton University, both in 2003.

== Legal career ==
Johnson was admitted to the State Bar of Texas in November 2003. He worked as an associate at Haynes and Boone and later of counsel at Andrews Kurth and Orrick, Herrington & Sutcliffe. In 2019, Johnson joined Locke Lord LLP as a partner. Following the firm's merger, he became counsel at Troutman Pepper Locke.

== Texas Legislature ==
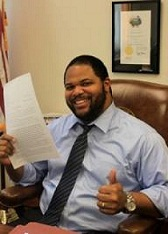
Johnson in October 2014

Johnson was sworn in as a member of the Texas House of Representatives on April 20, 2010, filling the vacant seat he won in a special election. Prior to the special election, Johnson defeated the longtime incumbent state representative, who was under federal indictment at the time related to corruption and abuse of office charges, in the 2010 Democratic Primary with 75 percent of the vote. Johnson was reelected in the November elections of 2010, 2012, 2014, 2016, and 2018.

Johnson founded and served as the chairman of the Young Texans Legislative Caucus (YTLC), which focuses on transportation, education, water, infrastructure, and other issues of interest to younger Texans. YTLC is open to Texas state representatives who are either under the age of 40 or represent a district that has a population under 40 that is greater than the state average of 58%. He served as the vice chairman of both the House natural resources committee and the House general investigating and ethics committee, and was the only member of the 83rd Texas legislature to serve as vice chairman of two standing house committees. Johnson also served on the House elections committee, the House select committee on transparency in state agency operations, and the Joint House and Senate committee on higher education governance, excellence and transparency. He has previously served on the House committees on appropriations, higher education, and the interim committee on manufacturing.

In October 2017, Johnson filed a request to remove a plaque from the Texas State Capitol that was placed by the Children of the Confederacy in 1959. The State Preservation Board of Texas unanimously voted in support of removing a plaque, which depicted the Children of the Confederacy Creed, from the capitol building in 2019.

Upon becoming mayor of Dallas, Johnson vacated his 100th House District seat, and his successor was determined in a special election.

Committee assignments by legislative session:

81st (2010)

- Criminal Jurisprudence
- Corrections

82nd (2011)

- Appropriations
- Appropriations Subcommittee on Articles VI, VII, and VIII (Natural Resources, Business and Economic Development, and Regulatory)
- Higher Education
- House and Senate Joint Committee on Higher Education Governance, Excellence and Transparency
- Interim Committee on Manufacturing

83rd (2013)

- Elections
- General Investigating and Ethics (vice chair)
- Natural Resources (vice chair)
- Select Committee on Transparency in State Agency Operations
- House and Senate Joint Committee on Higher Education Governance, Excellence and Transparency

84th (2015)

- Homeland Security and Public Safety
- Economic and Small Business Development (vice chair)
- Economic and Small Business Development Subcommittee on Small Business
- Calendars

85th (2017)

- Ways and Means
- Investments and Financial Services
- Redistricting (vice chair)
- Select Committee on State and Federal Power and Responsibility

86th (2019)

- Higher Education
- Urban Affairs

== Mayor of Dallas ==
=== Elections ===
On June 8, 2019, Johnson was elected mayor of Dallas, defeating his opponent, city councilman Scott Griggs, in a runoff election. It was announced that he would take office on June 17, 2019. With his election, Johnson became the second African-American mayor to be elected in Dallas history (the first being Ron Kirk) and one of the youngest mayors of a major American city. He was sworn in as mayor on June 17, 2019, by U.S. District Court Judge Sam Lindsay. In May 2023, Johnson was re-elected as mayor with 93% of the vote, garnering the highest vote share of any candidate since 1909.

=== Tenure ===
==== First term ====
In August 2019, it was announced Johnson took a job as a partner at Locke Lord. The position raised concerns about conflicts of interest as the firm had clients within the city government, including city employee retirement and pension funds. Locke Lord stated that it would implement a firewall between Johnson and any conflicts of interest he would encounter.

In September 2019, Johnson sent the Dallas City Council an open letter notifying them of plans by Interim CEO Sam Coats of Visit Dallas to eliminate Board seats allotted for the City. Johnson was alarmed by the proposal, which could reduce city oversight over Visit Dallas.

Early in his term, Johnson dealt with an EF-3 tornado in Dallas and pushed for federal assistance.

Johnson oversaw a budget that passed unanimously in 2019. But as budget season at City Hall started in 2020, Johnson began pushing an initiative to "defund the bureaucracy," a play on the Defund the Police slogan, which he was against. His proposals were rejected twice by the Dallas City Council. The rationale given by the mayor was since private sector employees were "feeling the pain" due to COVID-19 restrictions then public sector employees should as well. The first time Johnson brought up his proposals to "defund the bureaucracy," members of the Dallas City Council rejected it by a 13–1 margin. In September 2020, Johnson, who had vowed to take his plan to the public, published a message opposing police overtime cuts on NextDoor, which political opponents decried as inappropriate and attempted to brand as illicit. The Dallas City Council again rejected the "defund the bureaucracy" bid in a subsequent meeting and voted to cut the proposed police overtime budget by 25% over the mayor's objection.

In early 2020, Johnson formed the Mayor's International Advisory Council, a group of Dallas residents who all formerly held the rank of United States Ambassador and regularly advise Johnson on ways to improve the city's international stature and increase foreign direct investment and trade. Members of the Mayor's International Advisory Council include former U.S. senator from Texas, Kay Bailey Hutchison, former president and CEO of the Federal Reserve Bank of Dallas, Richard W. Fisher, Kathryn Walt Hall, Robert W. Jordan, Ron Kirk, Mark Langdale, James C. Oberwetter, and Jeanne L. Phillips. As part of the efforts made, Johnson and his International Advisory Council announced in December 2022 the opening of a new French Trade Office in Dallas in a newly established Dallas International District.

Johnson repeatedly called public safety his top priority. Johnson did win support in the budget for nearly $4.5 million in funding for his task force on safe communities recommendations. He formed the task force after the death of Brandoniya Bennett, a 9-year-old girl who was killed in her own home by errant gunfire meant for someone else. The task force made four recommendations for fighting violent crime. The City Council later agreed to fund the programs. In 2020, Johnson launched Dallas Works, a summer jobs program for Dallas youth. The program was modeled on other cities that had far more robust summer jobs programs than Dallas. Johnson in 2021 pushed for a major increase in police hiring in Dallas. The city council approved the plan, which called for an additional 200 officers over two years. Johnson also pushed back against efforts to cut into the police overtime budget, but was successful this time. After the budget passed, Johnson introduced an ethics reform package, which he called "historic." The plan's centerpiece was the hiring of an inspector general to prosecute ethical lapses. In 2022, he advocated for a restriction on operating hours for Sexually Oriented Businesses to reduce violent crime. Dallas became the only top-10 city in the United States to see violent crime fall in all the major categories tracked by the Federal Bureau of Investigation in both 2021 and 2022.

Johnson backed a "Back to Basics" and "Build for the Future" agenda that focused on lower property taxes, the creation of an economic development corporation for the city, a redo of the convention center, fixes for the permitting office, environmental resilience efforts, and street resurfacing.

During Johnson's tenure, the City of Dallas added more than $14 billion in new development and welcomed major corporations, including multiple Fortune 500 companies like Goldman Sachs, AECOM, CBRE, and Frontier Communications, that moved their headquarters or significant operations to the City of Dallas. The City of Dallas has reduced the city's property tax rate every year since Johnson became mayor, including passing the largest single-year tax rate reduction in 40 years in 2022.

==== COVID-19 response ====
On March 11, 2020, Johnson announced the cancellation of the St. Patrick's Day Parade, an annual event that draws more than 100,000 people to Lower Greenville, because of concerns about COVID-19. The next night, after evidence emerged of community spread in Dallas, Johnson declared a local state of disaster.

The next week, the city council extended the disaster declaration, and the mayor continued to enact regulations and restrictions. In an accompanying op-ed in The Dallas Morning News, Johnson wrote that "some of the measures we have taken — and actions we still may have to take — to stop COVID-19 may have seemed unimaginable a few months ago. The decisions I have made weighed heavily on me because of their economic implications. But life is priceless, and we must do what we can to protect it. That means we have to pay a price; many livelihoods will be temporarily affected."

Johnson created two COVID-19 recovery and assistance committees, started a private sector task force on economic recovery, pushed for Dallas county to begin reporting COVID-19 cases by ethnicity, required hospitals to report capacity numbers daily, and appointed a COVID-19 health and healthcare access czar. He also pushed for more testing in underserved communities and won multiple extensions of federal Community-Based Testing Sites. The two committees shepherded a relief package for small businesses and residents who were struggling to pay their mortgages or rent. The City Council also passed a "Dallas First" procurement plan that Johnson proposed to reward local firms bidding on city contracts, and passed an ordinance to delay evictions.

In January 2021, Johnson advocated for the city of Dallas to receive direct allocations of COVID-19 vaccines. The city of Dallas then received several direct allocations of vaccines that were distributed at the Kay Bailey Hutchison Convention Center and at The Potter's House.

Johnson publicly received the vaccine when he became eligible in January 2021 in an effort to discourage vaccine hesitancy. He contracted a breakthrough case of COVID-19 in October 2021.

==== Second term ====
On September 22, 2023, Johnson announced he was switching parties to become a Republican, stating that his views on police, low property taxes, and abortion were more in line with the Republican platform than the Democratic one. In response, the chair and vice-chair of the Texas Democratic Party rebuked Johnson as "an ineffective and truant mayor." Several other Dallas Democrats also expressed disapproval. However, Texas Republicans, including governor Greg Abbott and Texas House of Representatives speaker Dade Phelan, commended Johnson on his decision. As a result of Johnson's party switch, Dallas became the largest city in the United States with a Republican mayor, surpassing neighboring Fort Worth. In July 2024, Johnson made his first appearance at the Republican National Convention.

=== Controversies ===
==== Dallas City Hall Building's Future ====
Johnson was among the most vocal proponents of a plan to vacate the I.M. Pei-designed Dallas City Hall building. Proponents of the plan have called for demolishing the building and sell to private developers to create a mixed-use entertainment district with the goal of spurring development in the southern area of the city's central business district. In May, the Dallas Mavericks announced that they would not pursue a plan to build an arena in the area. The effort has drawn criticism for its lack of transparency.

==== Civility ====
At his inauguration, Johnson vowed to bring civility back to Dallas City Hall. This was a rebuke to what many saw as an aggressive style by some members of the Dallas City Council, which turned off some voters. Since becoming mayor, city officials, political consultants, and city hall watchers have criticized him as aloof, difficult to track down, and authoritarian. They describe Johnson's mayoral style as being dependent on interpersonal politics, rewarding loyalists while threatening and obstructing opponents.

==== Performance of City Hall ====
As the COVID-19 pandemic began to strike Dallas, critics attacked Johnson's style after he became the emergency management director for the city of Dallas, a designation that effectively took control away from the Dallas City Council and city manager for pandemic response. Johnson had created COVID-19 city council committees, but received additional criticism for taking away a co-chair designation from the committees.

Johnson was also targeted for protests by local environmentalists demanding help from Dallas City Hall over Shingle Mountain, a 190,000-ton mountain of roof shingles in debris occupying a private lot next to a few homes in southern Dallas.

During the 2020 DISD bond election, Johnson did not offer an explicit endorsement of the proposed bonds with his stated reason being he wanted to avoid a potential conflict of interest. Even though Johnson and his law firm are not representing the bond for Dallas Independent School District, the Mayor's spokesperson provided an updated statement by saying he "wants to avoid even the appearance of a conflict because he is a bond attorney." Tim Rogers, the editor of D Magazine who had previously criticized Johnson for his attempt to get his ten-year-old boots fixed by airing the query publicly on Twitter, blasted the mayor for not using the bully pulpit to support DISD.

Johnson has been criticized for occasionally missing parts of Dallas City Council meetings, over which he is the presiding officer. Johnson has also been engaged in political disputes with other government officials, including the city manager. In 2021, Johnson said he was "open to trying different things" and was later lauded by The Dallas Morning News for his committee assignments that seemed to embody a different approach in a new City Council term.

==== Dispute with Meghan Mangrum ====
On February 11, 2023, Johnson posted on Twitter criticizing local news media for, in his view, having "no interest" in reporting on the second year of dropping crime rates in the city of Dallas, prompting responses from multiple local media outlets, including reporters from The Dallas Morning News. Notably, Meghan Mangrum, a then-reporter for The Dallas Morning News posted, "Bruh, national news is always going to chase the trend. Cultivate relationships with quality local news partnerships." Mangrum's tweet elicited criticism from Johnson, who claimed she was "letting [her] inherent biases show", and her black executive editor, Katrice Hardy, asked if Mangrum would have used the term "bruh" when addressing a white mayor, to which Mangrum, who is white, affirmed with a yes. Mangrum argued that her use of "bruh" stemmed from her upbringing as a millennial hockey fan from Central Florida, and D Magazine reported that her Twitter feed showed her use of "bruh" in response to "all sorts of accounts".

Mangrum was fired from The Dallas Morning News three days after Johnson's reply for violating the paper's social media policy.

== Personal life ==
Johnson lives in Dallas and is divorced, the result of an affair with a staffer.

He is a member of Mountain View Church of Christ.

== See also ==
- List of Harvard University politicians
- List of mayors of the 50 largest cities in the United States

Political offices
Preceded by Mike Rawlings	Mayor of Dallas; 2019–present	Incumbent
