= Outline of Texas =

U.S. state

The flag of Texas

The obverse of the seal of Texas

The location of the State of Texas in the United States of America

The following outline is provided as an overview of and topical guide to Texas:

Texas – second-most populous and the second-most extensive of the 50 states of the United States of America. Texas borders Mexico and the Gulf of Mexico in the South Central United States. Texas is placed in the Southern United States by the United States Census Bureau. The Republic of Texas joined the United States as the 28th state on December 29, 1845. Texas joined the Confederate States of America during the American Civil War from 1861 to 1865 but was readmitted to the Union in 1870.

== General reference ==
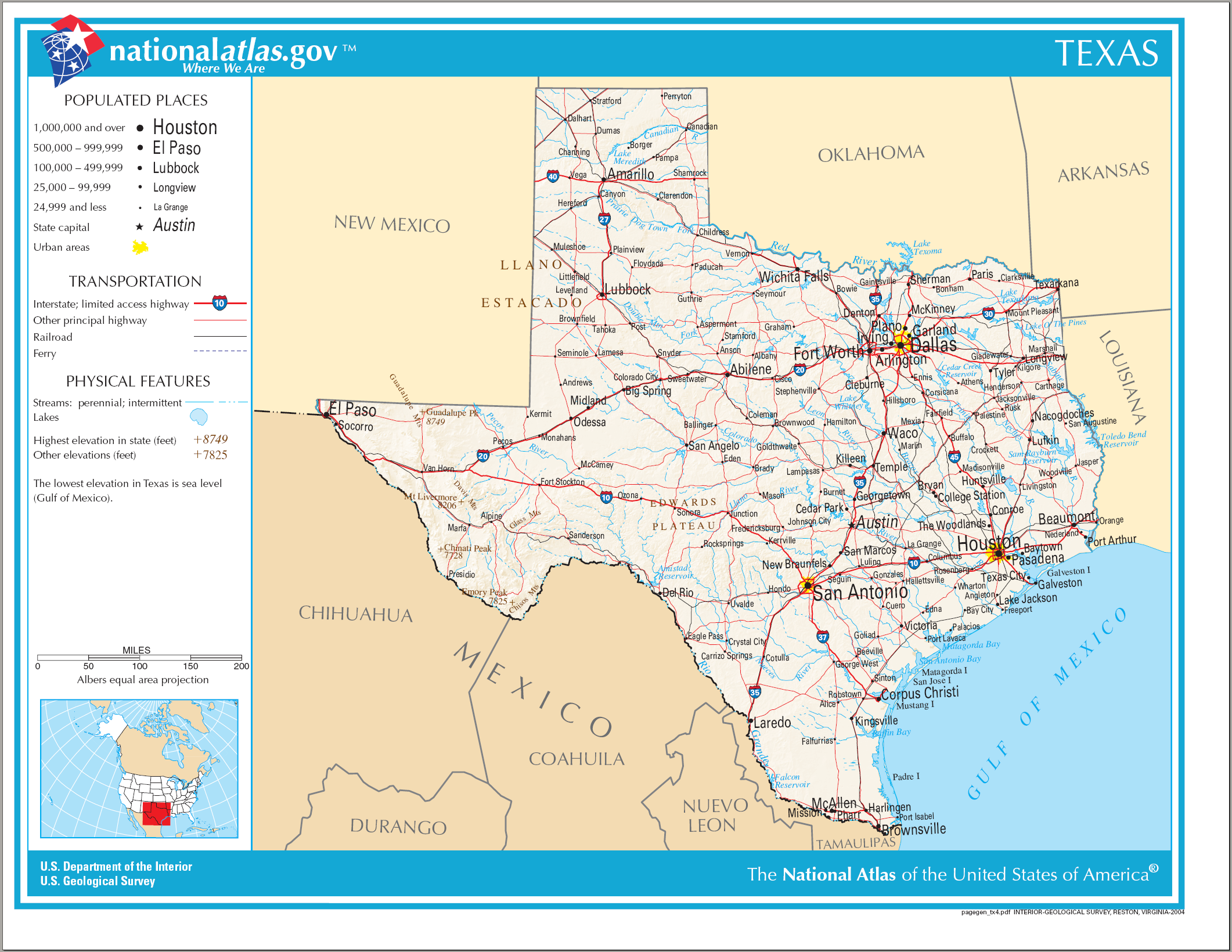
An enlargeable map of the State of Texas

- Names
  - Common name: Texas
    - Pronunciation: /ˈtɛksəs/
  - Official name: State of Texas
  - Abbreviations and name codes
    - Postal symbol: TX
    - ISO 3166-2 code: US-TX
    - Internet second-level domain: .tx.us
  - Nicknames
    - Lone Star State (used on license plates)
    - Chili State
- Adjectival: Texas
- Demonyms:
  - Texan
  - Texian (historical)

== Geography of Texas ==
Geography of Texas

- Texas is: a U.S. state, a federal state of the United States of America
- Location
  - Northern Hemisphere
  - Western Hemisphere
    - Americas
      - North America
        - Anglo-America
        - Northern America
          - United States
            - Contiguous United States
              - Western United States
                - Southwestern United States
              - Southern United States
                - South Central United States
                - Black Belt
                - Deep South
                  - Gulf Coast of the United States
- Population of Texas: 30,029,572 (2022 U.S. Census)
- Area of Texas: 268,581 square miles (695,622 km^{2})
- Atlas of Texas

=== Places in Texas ===
- Historic places in Texas
  - Abandoned communities in Texas
    - Ghost towns in Texas
  - National Historic Landmarks in Texas
  - National Register of Historic Places listings in Texas
    - Bridges on the National Register of Historic Places in Texas
- National Natural Landmarks in Texas
- National parks in Texas (2)
  - Big Bend National Park
  - Guadalupe Mountains National Park
- State parks in Texas

=== Environment of Texas ===
- Climate of Texas
  - Climate change in Texas
- Geology of Texas
- Protected areas in Texas
  - State forests of Texas
- Superfund sites in Texas
- Save Our Springs Alliance
- Texas Natural Resources Information System
- Wildlife of Texas
  - Fauna of Texas
    - Birds of Texas
    - Mammals of Texas
    - Reptiles of Texas
    - Butterflies of Texas

==== Natural geographic features of Texas ====
- Islands of Texas
- Lakes of Texas
- Rivers of Texas
- Estuaries of Texas

=== Regions of Texas ===
- Central Texas
- Eastern Texas
- Northern Texas
- Northeastern Texas
- Southern Texas
- Southeastern Texas
- Texas Panhandle
- Texas Gulf Coast
- Western Texas

==== Administrative divisions of Texas ====
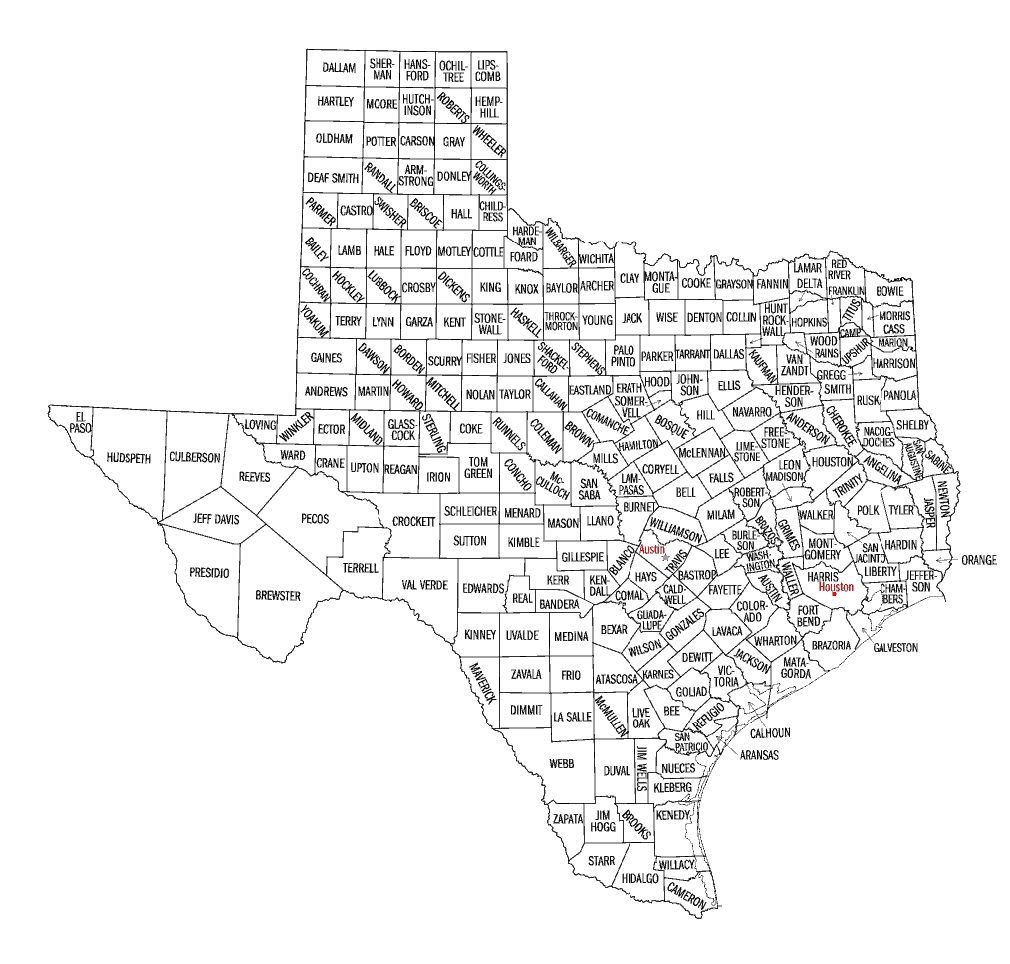
An enlargeable map of the 254 counties of the state of Texas

- The 254 counties of the state of Texas
  - Municipalities in Texas
    - Cities in Texas
      - State capital of Texas: Austin
      - Largest city in Texas: Houston (fourth-largest city in the United States)
      - City nicknames in Texas
    - Towns in Texas
    - Unincorporated communities in Texas

=== Demography of Texas ===
Demographics of Texas

- German Texan
- History of African-Americans in Texas
- History of African Americans in Houston
- History of African Americans in Dallas-Ft. Worth
- History of African Americans in San Antonio
- Jewish history in Texas
- Hispanics and Latinos in Texas
- History of Mexican-Americans in Texas
- History of Mexican Americans in Houston
- History of Mexican Americans in Dallas-Fort Worth

== Government and politics of Texas ==
- Form of government: U.S. state government
- Texas's congressional delegations
- Texas State Capitol
- Elections in Texas
  - Electoral reform in Texas
- Political party strength in Texas

=== Branches of the government of Texas ===
Government of Texas

==== Executive branch of the government of Texas ====
- Governor of Texas
  - Lieutenant Governor of Texas
  - Secretary of State of Texas
- State departments
  - List of Texas state agencies
  - Texas Commission on Environmental Quality
  - Texas Department of Transportation
  - Texas Education Agency
  - Texas Parks and Wildlife Department

==== Legislative branch of the government of Texas ====
- Texas Legislature (bicameral)
  - Upper house: Texas Senate
  - Lower house: Texas House of Representatives

==== Judicial branch of the government of Texas ====
Courts of Texas

- Supreme Court of Texas

=== Law and order in Texas ===
Law of Texas

- Cannabis in Texas
- Capital punishment in Texas
  - People executed in Texas
- Constitution of Texas
- Crime in Texas
- Gun laws in Texas
- Law enforcement in Texas
  - Law enforcement agencies in Texas
    - Texas State Police (1870–1873)
    - Texas Highway Patrol
    - Texas Ranger Division
  - Prisons in Texas

=== Military in Texas ===
Texas Military Forces

- Texas Air National Guard
- Texas Army National Guard
- Texas State Guard

== History of Texas ==
- History of Texas
- List of years in Texas

=== History of Texas, by period ===
- Prehistory of Texas
- Early Spanish exploration, 1519
- French colonization of Texas, 1684–1689
- Spanish Texas, as part of the Viceroyalty of New Spain, 1690–1821
  - History of slavery in Texas
  - Parts of the current state were also included in the following provinces of New Spain
    - Nueva Vizcaya, 1577–1821
    - Santa Fe de Nuevo México, 1598–1821
    - Nuevo Santander, 1746–1821
  - Commandancy General of the Provincias Internas
  - Spanish missions in Texas
- French colony of Louisiane, 1699–1764
  - Treaty of Fontainebleau (1762)
- Spanish (though predominantly Francophone) district of Baja Luisiana, 1764–1803
  - Third Treaty of San Ildefonso of 1800
- French district of Basse-Louisiane, 1803
  - Louisiana Purchase of 1803
- Territorial claims of United States Louisiana Purchase, 1803–1821
  - Sabine Free State, 1806–1821
  - Adams–Onís Treaty of 1819
- Mexican War of Independence, 1810–1821
  - Gutiérrez–Magee Expedition, 1812–1813
  - Long Expedition, 1819
  - Treaty of Córdoba of 1821
- Mexican Texas, 1821–1836
  - The Constitution of Mexico of 1824 created the state Coahuila y Tejas from Spanish Texas and Coahuila.
  - Parts of the current state of Texas were also included in the following Mexican states
    - Chihuahua, since 1824
    - Nuevo León, since 1824
    - Tamaulipas, since 1824
    - Santa Fe de Nuevo México, 1824–1848
    - Coahuila, since 1836
  - Texas Revolution, 1835–1836
  - Timeline of the Texas Revolution
  - Treaties of Velasco, 1836
  - Texas Declaration of Independence, 1836
- Republic of Texas, 1836–1845
  - Texas–Indian Wars, 1836–1875
- Republic of the Rio Grande, 1840
- U.S. State of Texas since December 29, 1845
  - History of Texas (1845–1860)
    - Texas annexation of 1845
    - Mexican–American War, 1846–1848
    - Treaty of Guadalupe Hidalgo of 1848
    - Compromise of 1850
    - Northwestern territorial claims ceded 1850
  - Texas in the American Civil War, 1861–1865; part of the Confederate States of America
  - Texas in Reconstruction, 1865–1870
  - Comanche Campaign, 1868–1874

=== History of Texas, by region ===
- History of Austin, Texas
- History of Corpus Christi, Texas
- History of Dallas, Texas
- History of El Paso, Texas
- History of Fort Worth, Texas
- History of Galveston, Texas
- History of Houston
- History of Marshall, Texas
- History of San Antonio, Texas
- History of Sugar Land, Texas

=== History of Texas, by subject ===
- History of education in Texas
  - History of Texas A&M University
  - History of the University of Texas at Austin
  - History of Texas Tech University
- History of Texas forests
- History of law enforcement in Texas
  - History of the Texas Ranger Division
  - History of vice in Texas
- List of Texas state legislatures
- History of religion in Texas
  - History of Judaism in Texas
    - History of the Jews in Brazos County, Texas
    - History of the Jews in Brenham, Texas
    - History of the Jews in Dallas, Texas
    - History of the Jews in Galveston, Texas
- History of slavery in Texas
- History of sports in Texas
  - History of the Houston Astros
  - History of the Texas Rangers (baseball)

== Culture of Texas ==
Culture of Texas

- Museums in Texas
- Religion in Texas
  - The Church of Jesus Christ of Latter-day Saints in Texas
  - Episcopal Diocese of Texas
  - Jewish history in Texas
- Scouting in Texas
- State symbols of Texas
  - Flag of Texas
  - Seal of Texas
- Texas cuisine

=== The arts in Texas ===
- Music of Texas

=== Sports in Texas ===
Sports in Texas

== Economy and infrastructure of Texas ==
Economy of Texas

- Communications in Texas
  - Newspapers in Texas
  - Radio stations in Texas
  - Television stations in Texas
- Health care in Texas
  - Hospitals in Texas
- Transportation in Texas
  - Airports in Texas
  - Roads in Texas
    - U.S. Highways in Texas
    - Interstate Highways in Texas
    - State highways in Texas
  - Rail in Texas
    - Texas Central Railway
    - Texas Electric Railway

== Education in Texas ==
Education in Texas

- Schools in Texas
  - School districts in Texas
    - High schools in Texas
  - Private schools in Texas
  - Colleges and universities in Texas

== See also ==
- Topic overview:
  - Texas
  - Index of Texas-related articles
