= List of Chery vehicles =

Chinese automaker Chery Automobile produces vehicles under many of its brands, which are Chery, Exeed, iCar, Jaecoo, Jetour, Rely, Lepas and Omoda, also including its discontinued brands, Riich.

This list does not include Karry, the former commercial brand under Chery Automobile. It is currently under Chery Holding, which has no capital ties with Chery Automobile after its IPO since 2025.

In this list, the local Chinese market name of the vehicles takes precedence, while the alternative and export market names are listed in its "Also called" column. The "Also called" column does not list brands not owned by Chery such as DR Automobiles, MVM, Fownix, and others, and the italics shows for the export names.

For Luxeed, the brand in cooperation with Huawei under the Harmony Intelligent Mobility Alliance (HIMA), see List of HIMA vehicles.

== Current vehicles ==
=== Chery ===
The main Chery brand has been divided into two major series, which are Arrizo for sedans and Tiggo for SUVs. Later in 2022, Chery added the Omoda series, and in 2023 the Tansuo (Explore/Discovery) series was added. The Jaecoo range was also introduced. In November 2023, Chery added the Fulwin product line to market plug-in hybrid and later battery electric vehicles in China. Chery Fulwin vehicles are distributed through separate dealership network. Most Fulwin vehicles are based on Chery petrol vehicles with an additional plug-in hybrid system marketed as Kunpeng Super Performance Electric Hybrid C-DM.

Image	Name(s)	Chinese name(s)	Also called	Introduction (cal. year)	Gen	Description
Cars
Shiyue Mate image	QQ Duomi	多米	Kaiyi Shiyue Mate; Jetour X20e	2025	1st	City car, BEV, rebadged Kaiyi Shiyue Mate.
	eQ1	小蚂蚁	Chery iCar; Aiqar eQ1	2017	1st	City car, BEV
	QQ Ice Cream	QQ冰淇淋	Jetour Ice Cream; Aiqar QQ Ice Cream	2021	1st	City car, BEV
	QQ3	QQ3	Chery Q	2026	3rd	Subcompact hatchback, BEV
	QQ5	QQ5	–	Upcoming	1st	Subcompact hatchback, BEV
	Arrizo 5	艾瑞泽5	–	2016	1st	Compact sedan
	Arrizo 5 Plus	艾瑞泽5 PLUS	Chery Arrizo 6 Pro; Omoda S5; Omoda O5	2021	1st	Compact sedan
	Arrizo 7	艾瑞泽7		2013	2nd	Mid-size sedan
	Arrizo 8 Fulwin A8L	艾瑞泽8 风云A8L	–	2022 2024	1st	Mid-size sedan PHEV variant of Arrizo 8
	Fulwin A9	风云A9	–	2026	1st	Mid-size sedan, BEV/EREV
	Fulwin A9L	风云A9L	Exeed ES7	2025	1st	Full-size sedan, EREV
SUV
	Tiggo 3x	瑞虎3x	Chery Tiggo 2; Chery Tiggo 1X; Omoda 3	2016	1st	Subcompact SUV
	Tiggo 5x	瑞虎5x	Chery Tiggo 3; Chery Tiggo 4; Chery Tiggo Cross	2017	1st	Subcompact SUV, ICE/HEV
	Tiggo 5x High Energy Tiggo 5 Sport Omoda E5	瑞虎5x高能版 瑞虎5运动版 –	Chery FX; Chery C5; Chery O5; Omoda C5; Omoda 5; Chery E5; Omoda C5 EV	2022 2026 2024	1st	Compact SUV, was previously named Omoda (欧萌达) from 2022 to 2025. BEV variant, export-only
	Fulwin X3 Fulwin X3L/Plus	风云X3 风云X3L/Plus	Jaecoo J6; Jaecoo EJ6; Jaecoo 6 EV; Chery iCar 03; Chery J6; Aiqar eQ3; iCaur 03; iCar 03; iCar 03T	2025	1st	Compact SUV, BEV/EREV, previously named iCar 03.
	Tiggo 7	瑞虎7	–	2016	2nd	Compact SUV, ICE/PHEV
	Tiggo 7 High Energy	瑞虎7高能版	Jaecoo J7	2024	1st	Compact SUV, Restyled variant of Tansuo 06
	Tiggo 7L	瑞虎7L	Omoda C7; Omoda 7	2026	1st	Compact SUV, ICE/PHEV
	Fulwin T7	风云T7	Lepas L6	2026	1st	Compact SUV, BEV
	Tiggo 8 Fulwin T8	瑞虎8 风云T8	Chery Tiggo Grand Tour; Chery Tiggo 8 Pro/Tiggo ReV	2018 2025	1st	Mid-size SUV, ICE/PHEV PHEV variant of Tiggo 8
	Tiggo 8 (2nd) Fulwin T8L	瑞虎8 风云T8L	Lepas L8	2025 Upcoming	2nd	Mid-size SUV PHEV variant of Tiggo 8 (2nd)
	Tiggo 9X Fulwin T9	瑞虎9X 风云T9	Chery Tiggo 9	2024	1st	Mid-size SUV, was previously named Tiggo 8L from 2024 to 2026. PHEV variant of Tiggo 9X
	Fulwin T9L	风云T9L	–	2026	1st	Mid-size SUV
	Tiggo 9 Fulwin T10	瑞虎9 风云T10	Jaecoo J8	2023 2024	1st	Mid-size SUV PHEV variant of Tiggo 9
	Tiggo V	瑞虎V	–	Upcoming	1st	Full-size SUV convertible to a pickup truck
	Tiggo 9L	瑞虎9L	–	Upcoming	1st	Full-size SUV
	Fulwin T11	风云T11	Exeed ET8; Exlantix ET9; Jaecoo 9	2025	1st	Full-size SUV, EREV

=== Chery New Energy ===
Chery New Energy is a subsidiary of Chery established in 2010 to produce and market battery electric vehicles.

Image	Name	Chinese name	Also called	Introduction (cal. year)	Gen	Description
Cars
	Arrizo e	艾瑞泽e	–	2016	1st	Compact sedan, BEV variant of Arrizo 5.
SUV
	eQ7	舒享家	Chery Tiggo 6; Aiqar eQ7	2023	1st	Compact SUV, BEV

=== Exeed ===
Image	Name(s)	Chinese name(s)	Also called	Introduction (cal. year)	Gen	Description
Sedan
	Sterra ES	星纪元ES	Exlantix ES	2023	1st	Mid-size sedan, BEV
Station wagon
	Sterra ES7 GT	星纪元ES7 GT	–	2025	1st	Mid-size wagon, BEV
SUV
	ET5	ET5	Exeed MX	2025	1st	Mid-size SUV, BEV/PHEV
	RX/EX6	瑶光/EX6	Omoda C9	2023	1st	Mid-size SUV, ICE/PHEV
	TXL	凌云	–	2019	1st	Mid-size SUV
	VX	揽月	–	2020	1st	Mid-size SUV, ICE/PHEV
	Sterra ET/ EX7	星纪元ET/ EX7	Exlantix ET	2024	1st	Mid-size SUV, BEV/PHEV

=== Jetour ===
Image	Name	Chinese name	Also called	Introduction (cal. year)	Gen	Description
SUV
	X70M	X70M	Soueast DX3	2026	1st	Compact SUV, rebadged Soueast DX3
	Huanyouzhe	环游者	Jetour TX	2026	1st	Compact SUV, BEV
	Freedom/Freedom 7 Shanhai T1/Freedom 7 Plus C-DM	自由者/自由者7 山海T1/自由者7 Plus C-DM	Jetour T1; Jetour T1 i-DM	2024	1st	Compact SUV PHEV variant of Freedom
	Traveller/Traveller 7 Traveller C-DM/Traveller 7 C-DM	旅行者/旅行者7 旅行者C-DM/旅行者7 C-DM	Jetour T2; Jetour T2 i-DM	2023 2024	1st	Mid-size SUV PHEV variant of Traveller
	Dashing	大圣	Soueast S06	2022	1st	Compact SUV
	X70 X70 Plus Shanhai L7	X70 X70 PLUS 山海L7	Soueast DX8; Soueast DX8 Plus; Soueast S07; Jetour VT9; -	2018 2020 2024	1st	Compact SUV Upgraded variant of X70 PHEV variant of X70
	X90 X70L Shanhai L7 Plus	X90 X70L 山海L7 PLUS	Soueast S08; -	2019 2025	2nd 1st	Mid-size SUV PHEV variant of X70L
	X90 Plus	X90 PLUS	Soueast S09; -	2021	1st	Mid-size SUV, Upgraded variant
	Zongheng R700	纵横R700	–	upcoming	1st	Mid-size SUV, PHEV
	Zongheng G700	纵横G700	Jetour G700; Jetour GAIA G700	2025	1st	Full-size SUV, PHEV
	Zongheng G900	纵横G900	–	upcoming	1st	Full-size SUV, PHEV
Pickup truck
	Zongheng F700	纵横F700	Jetour F700; Jetour P5	2026	1st	Full-size pickup truck, PHEV.

==== Jetour (exported or built outside China only) ====
Image	Name	Also called	Introduction (cal. year)	Gen	Description
SUV
	X50	Soueast DX5; Soueast S05	2024	1st	Compact SUV, rebadged Soueast DX5 for the Middle East market
	X50e	Kaiyi X3 Pro EV; Jetour eVT5	2025	1st	Subcompact SUV, BEV variant of Kaiyi Showjet for the Southeast Asia market

=== iCar ===
Image	Name	Also called	Introduction (cal. year)	Gen	Description
SUV
	V23	iCaur V23; Chery V23	2024	1st	Compact SUV, BEV
	V25	iCaur V25	2026	1st	Compact SUV, EREV
	V27	iCaur V27	2026	1st	Mid-size SUV, EREV

=== Rely ===
Image	Name	Chinese name	Also called	Introduction (cal. year)	Gen	Description
Pickup truck
	R08 Reaolc/R08 Pro	威麟R08 威麟捷想者/R08 PRO	Chery Himla	2025	1st	Mid-size pick-up truck
	Hi800	威麟Hi800	Chery Stockman; Chery Grootman	Upcoming	1st	Full-size pick-up truck, diesel PHEV

=== Freelander ===
Image	Name	Chinese name	Also called	Introduction (cal. year)	Gen	Description
SUV
	8	神行者8		2026	1st	Full-size SUV, PHEV/BEV/EREV

=== Jaecoo ===
This section only lists original Jaecoo models, rebadged vehicles sold by Jaecoo are listed in other sections.

Image	Name	Also called	Introduction (cal. year)	Gen	Description
	J5 J5 EV	Jaecoo 5; Jaecoo J6; Jaecoo 5 EV; Jaecoo E5	2025	1st	Subcompact SUV, ICE/BEV, export-only

=== Omoda ===
This section only lists original Omoda models, rebadged vehicles sold by Omoda are listed in other sections.

Image	Name	Also called	Introduction (cal. year)	Gen	Description
	O4		2026	1st	Subcompact SUV, ICE/BEV, export-only

=== Lepas ===
Image	Name	Also called	Introduction (cal. year)	Gen	Description
	L4		2026	1st	Subcompact SUV, ICE/BEV, export-only

== Discontinued vehicles ==
=== Chery ===
Image	Name	Chinese name(s)	Also called	Introduction (cal. year)	Discontinued (cal. year)	Gen	Description
Cars
	QQ6 Cowin 1	QQ6 旗云1	Chery Jaggi; Chery S21	2006	2013	1st	City car
	QQme	QQme	-	2009	2011	1st	City car
	A1	A1	Chery A113; Chery Arauca; Chery Campus; Chery Ego; Chery Kimo; Chery J1; Chery Face; Chery Fresh	2007	2015	1st	City car
	Fulwin	风云	Chery A11; Chery Windcloud	1999	2006	1st	Subcompact sedan, Rebadged SEAT Toledo
	Fulwin 2	风云2	Chery A13; Chery Storm 2; Chery Bonus; Chery Very; Chery Celer; Chery Cristal	2008	2019	1st	Subcompact sedan/hatchback
	Cowin Cowin 2	旗云 旗云2	Chery A15; Chery A168; Chery Amulet; Chery Flagcloud; Chery Viana	2003	2016	1st	Subcompact sedan
	E3 Arrizo 3	E3 艾瑞泽3	Cowin E3	2013	2020	1st	Subcompact sedan
	A3	A3	Chery J3; Chery M11; Chery Apola; Chery Chance/Niche; Chery Cielo; Chery Tengo; Chery Skin/Skin Sport; Chery Orinoco; Chery Cruise	2008	2015	1st	Compact sedan/hatchback
	Cowin 3	旗云3	Chery A5; Chery Alia; Chery Elara; Chery Fora; Chery J5	2006	2012	1st	Compact sedan
	E5	E5	Chery Riich G3	2011	2016	1st	Compact sedan
	Arrizo 5 GT	艾瑞泽5 GT	Omoda S5 GT; Omoda O5 GT	2022	2025	1st	Compact sedan
	Arrizo GX	艾瑞泽GX	Chery Arrizo 6	2018	2021	1st	Compact sedan, rebadged to Arrizo 5 Plus
	Eastar	东方之子	Chery Cowin 5; Chery E8	2006	2016	2nd	Mid-size sedan
SUV
	Tansuo 06 Fulwin T6	探索06 风云T6	Jaecoo J7	2023 2024	2026 2025	1st	Compact SUV PHEV variant of Tansuo 06
	Tiggo Tiggo 3	瑞虎 瑞虎3	Chery J11	2005	2023	1st	Compact SUV
Minivan
	Eastar Cross Arrizo M7	东方之子Cross 艾瑞泽M7	Chery V5; Chery B14; Chery Boss; Chery Destiny; Chery Eastar ES; Chery Cross; Chery Maxime; Rely V5	2006	2018	1st	Compact MPV

=== Chery New Energy ===
Image	Name	Chinese name(s)	Introduction (cal. year)	Discontinued (cal. year)	Gen	Description
Cars
	QQ3 EV/eQ	QQ3 EV/eQ	2010	2020	2nd	City car, BEV
	Wujie Pro	无界Pro	2022	2023	1st	City car, BEV
SUV
	Tiggo 3xe	瑞虎3xe	2017	2020	1st	Subcompact SUV, BEV variant of Tiggo 3x.
	Tiggo e	瑞虎e	2019	2022	1st	Subcompact SUV, BEV variant of Tiggo 5x.
	eQ5	大蚂蚁	2020	2023	1st	Compact SUV, BEV

=== Exeed ===
Image	Name(s)	Chinese name(s)	Introduction (cal. year)	Discontinued (cal. year)	Gen	Description
SUV
	LX	追风	2019	2026	1st	Compact SUV, ICE/PHEV
	TX	TX	2019	2022	1st	Mid-size SUV

=== Jetour ===
Image	Name	Chinese name	Also called	Introduction (cal. year)	Discontinued (cal. year)	Gen	Description
SUV
	Shanhai L6	山海L6	–	2024	2026	1st	Compact SUV, PHEV variant of Dasheng
	Shanhai L9	山海L9	–	2024	2026	1st	Mid-size SUV, PHEV variant of X90
	X95	X95	–	2019	2024	1st	Mid-size SUV

=== Riich ===
Image	Name	Chinese name	Also called	Introduction (cal. year)	Discontinued (cal. year)	Gen	Description
Cars
	M1 X1 M5	瑞麒M1 瑞麒X1 瑞麒M5	Chery M1; Chery S18	2009	2014	1st	City car Crossover version of the M1 Notchback version of the M1
	G3	瑞麒G3	Chery E5	2011	2014	1st	Compact sedan
	G5	瑞麒G5	Chery G5	2009	2013	1st	Mid-size sedan
	G6	瑞麒G6	Chery G6	2010	2015	1st	Full-size sedan

=== Rely ===
Image	Name	Chinese name	Also called	Introduction (cal. year)	Discontinued (cal. year)	Gen	Description
SUV
	X5	威麟X5	Chery Higgo 3	2009	2012	1st	Compact SUV
Van
	H3/H5/H6	威麟H3/H5/H6	Chery Transcom	2010	2021	1st	Van

== Concept cars ==
=== Chery ===
- 2005 Chery B13
- 2005 Chery M14
- 2006 Chery LUI
- 2006 Chery LEI
- 2006 Chery A6cc
- 2007 Chery Shooting Sport
- 2012 Chery TX
- 2012 Chery Ant
- 2013 Chery Ant 2.0
- 2013 Chery a7
- 2013 Chery a5
- 2014 Chery Concept Alpha
- 2014 Chery Concept Beta
- 2014 Chery Beta 5
- 2014 Chery Concept
- 2016 Chery FV2030
- 2017 Chery Tiggo Coupe
- 2022 Chery GENE
- 2023 Chery Arrizo Star
- 2024 Chery Fulwin E06
- 2024 Chery Fulwin E05
- 2024 Chery Fulwin Liefeng
- 2025 Chery QQ
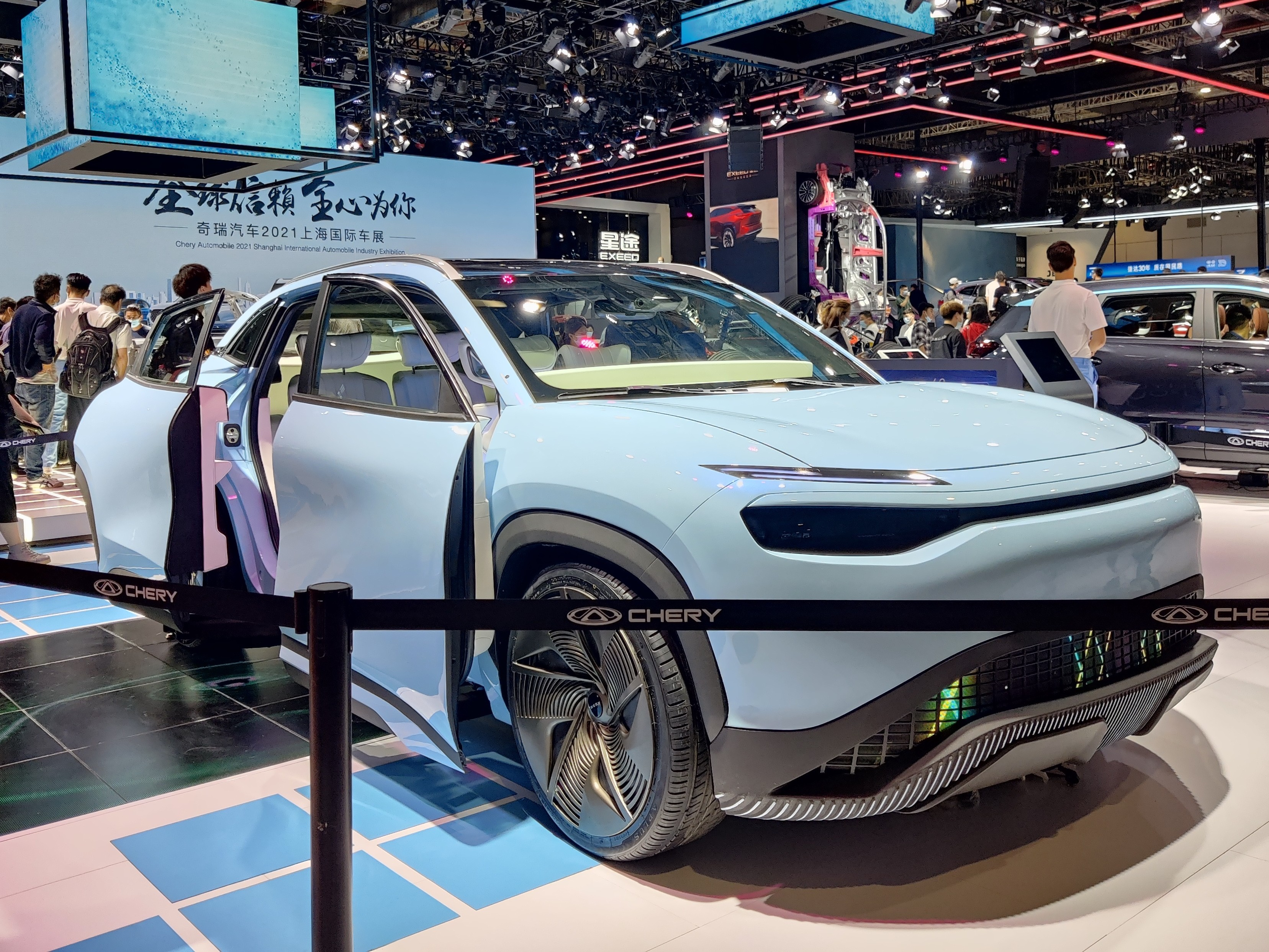
Chery Antee X Concept

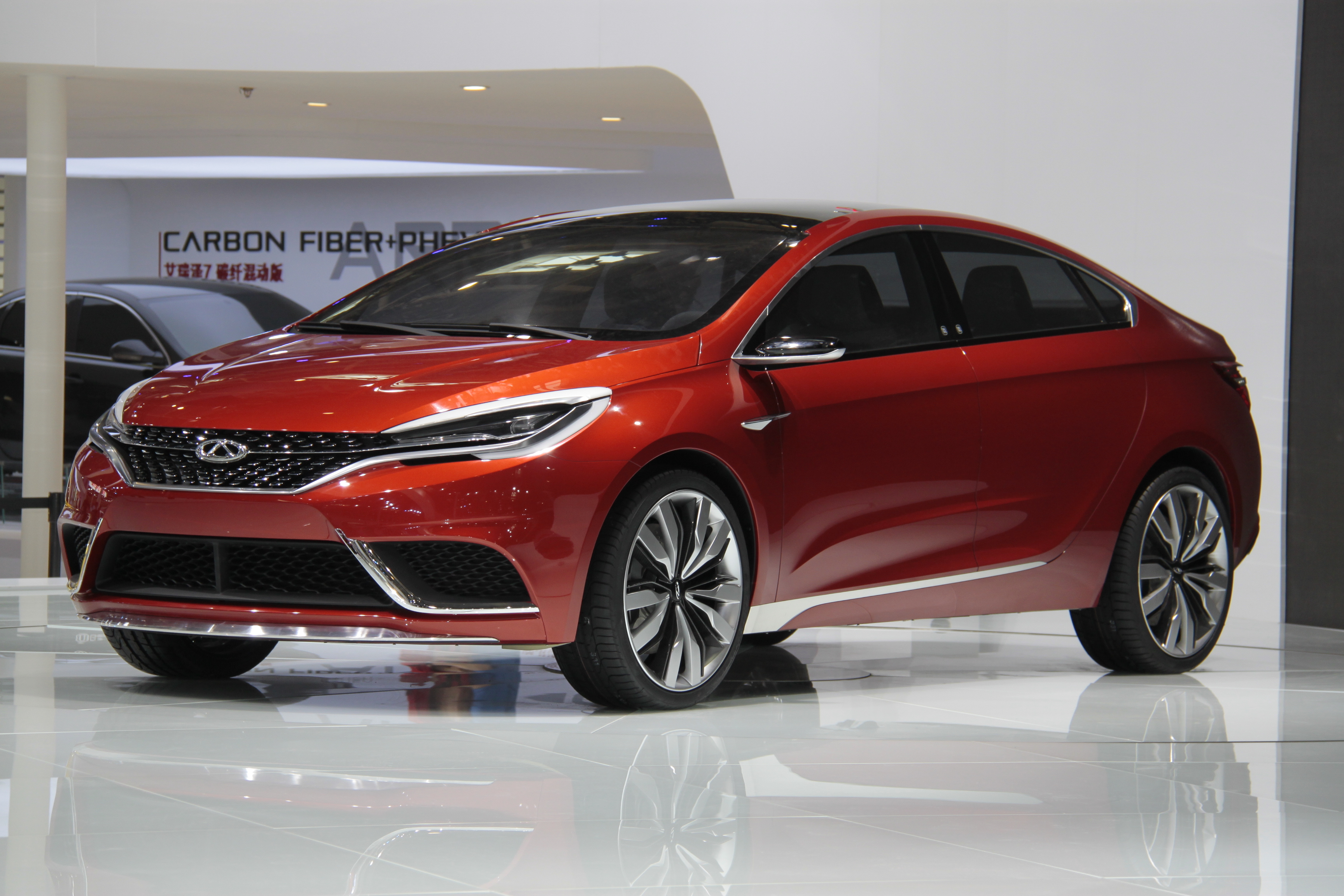
Chery Concept α

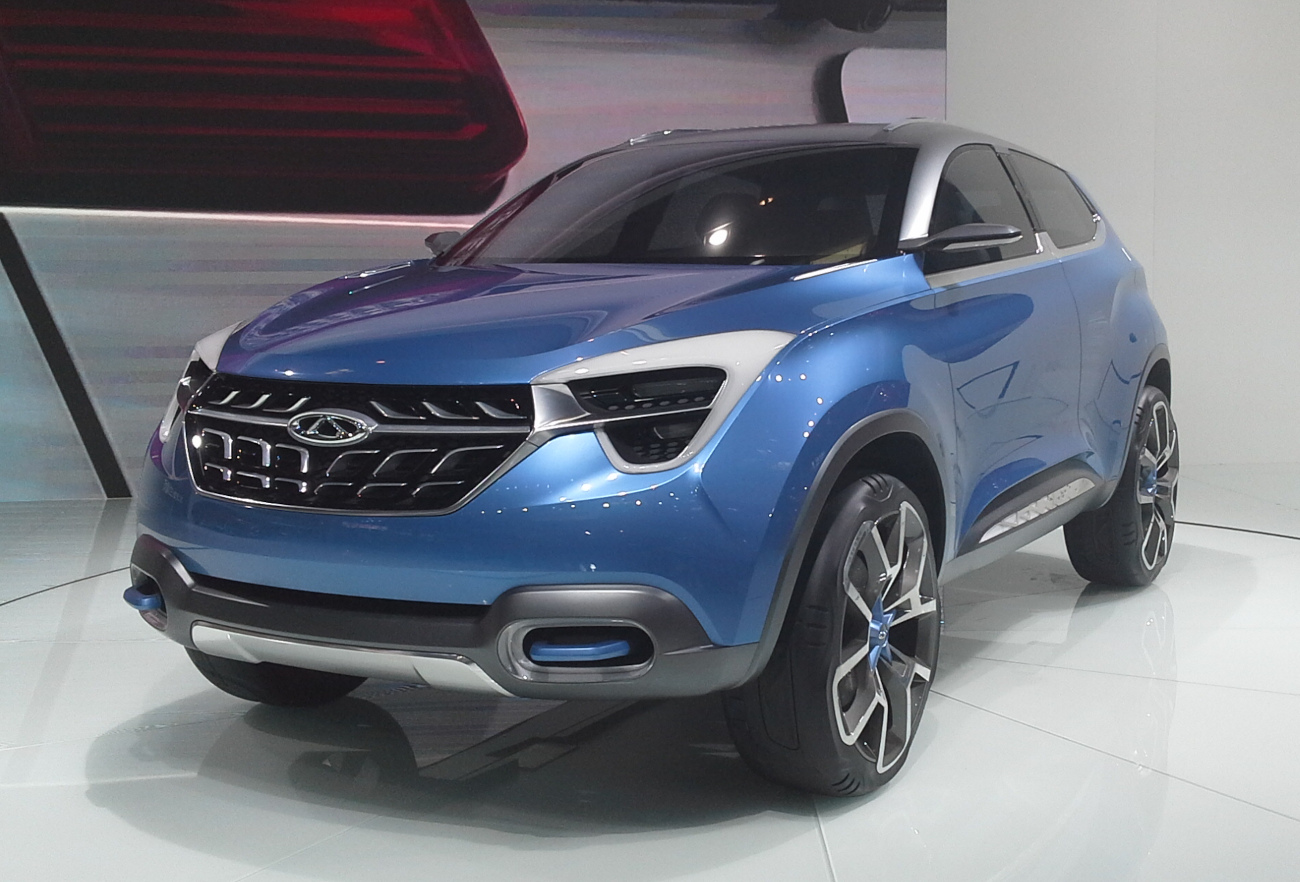
Chery Concept β

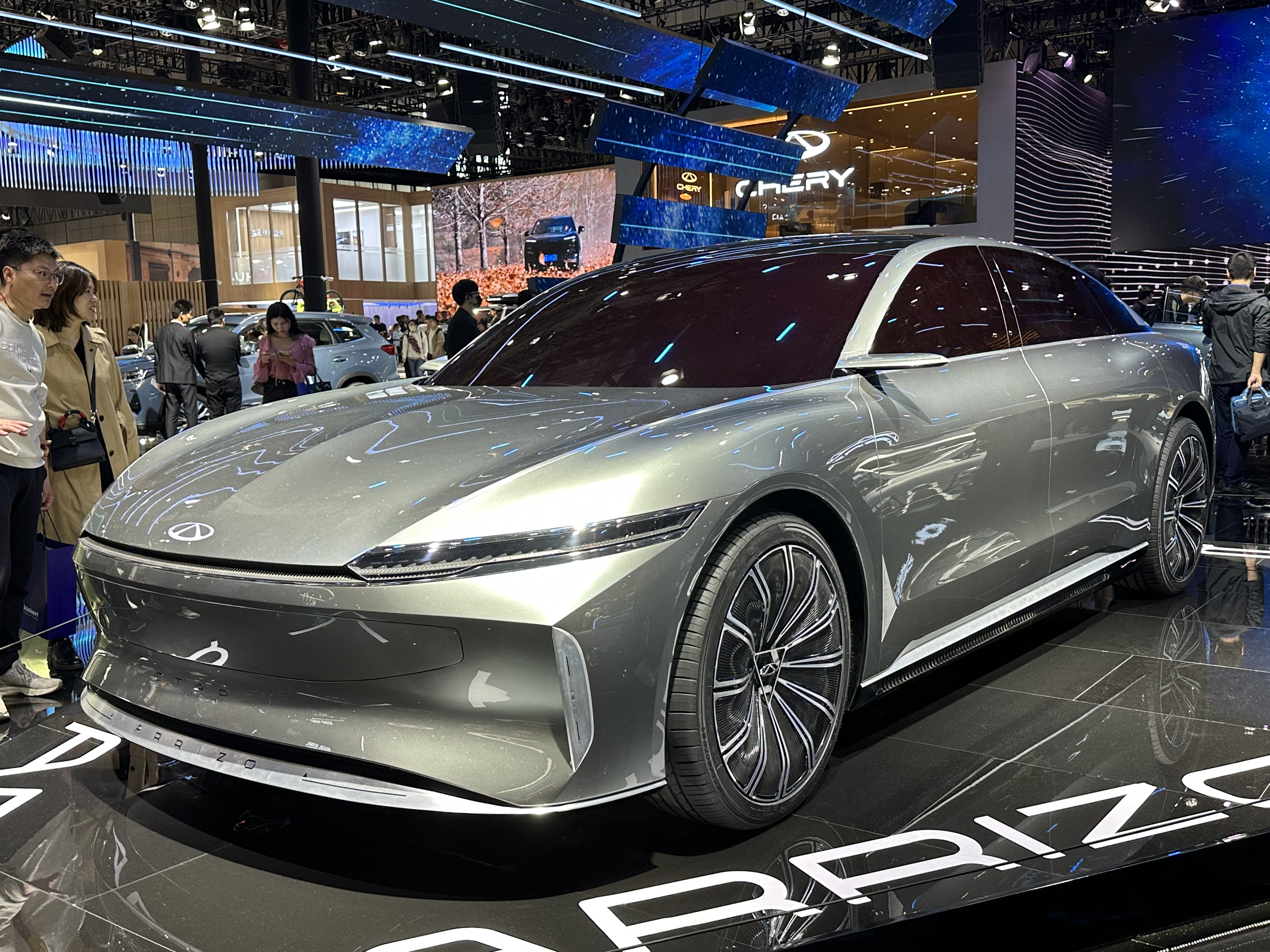
Chery Arrizo Star Concept

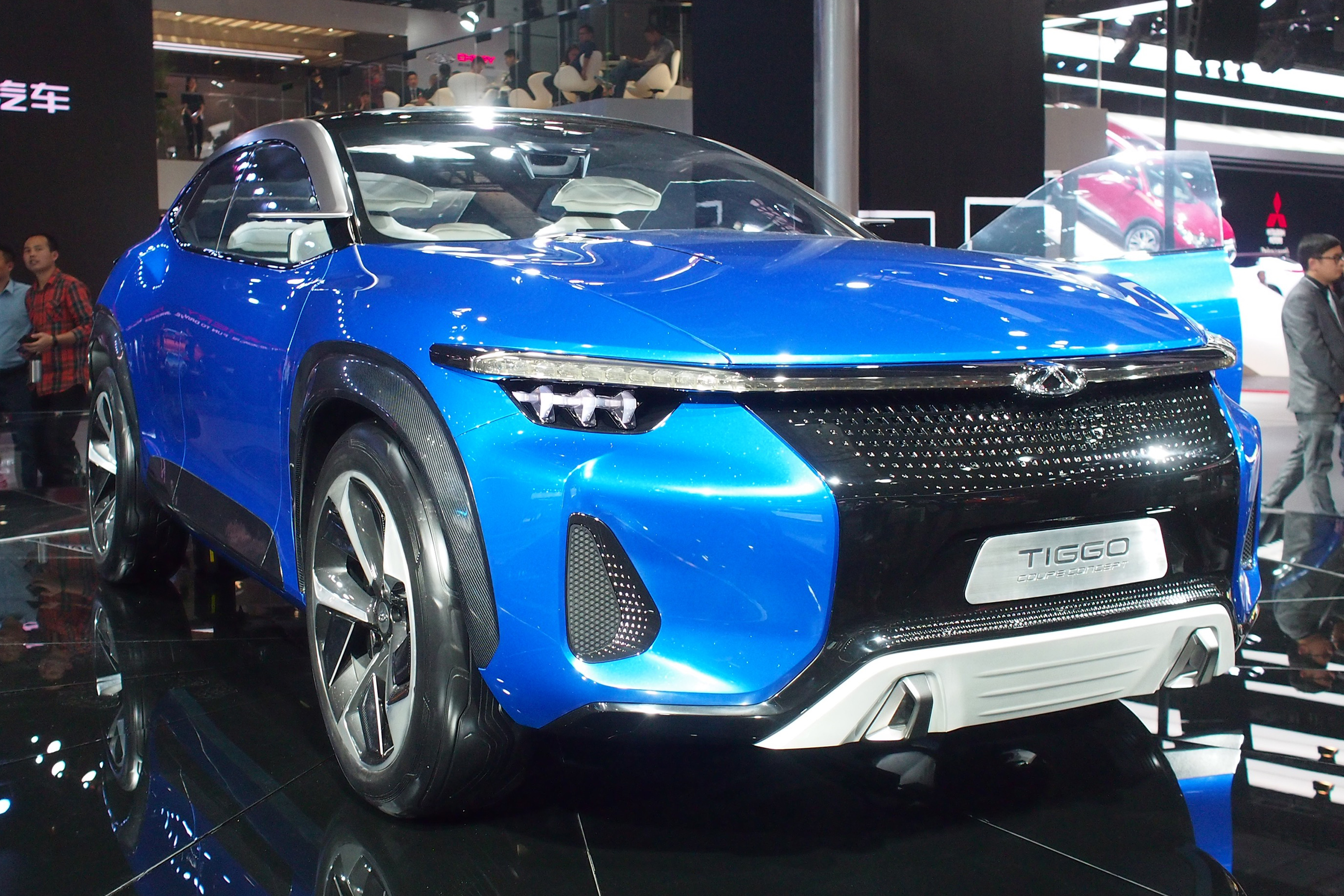
Chery Tiggo Coupe Concept

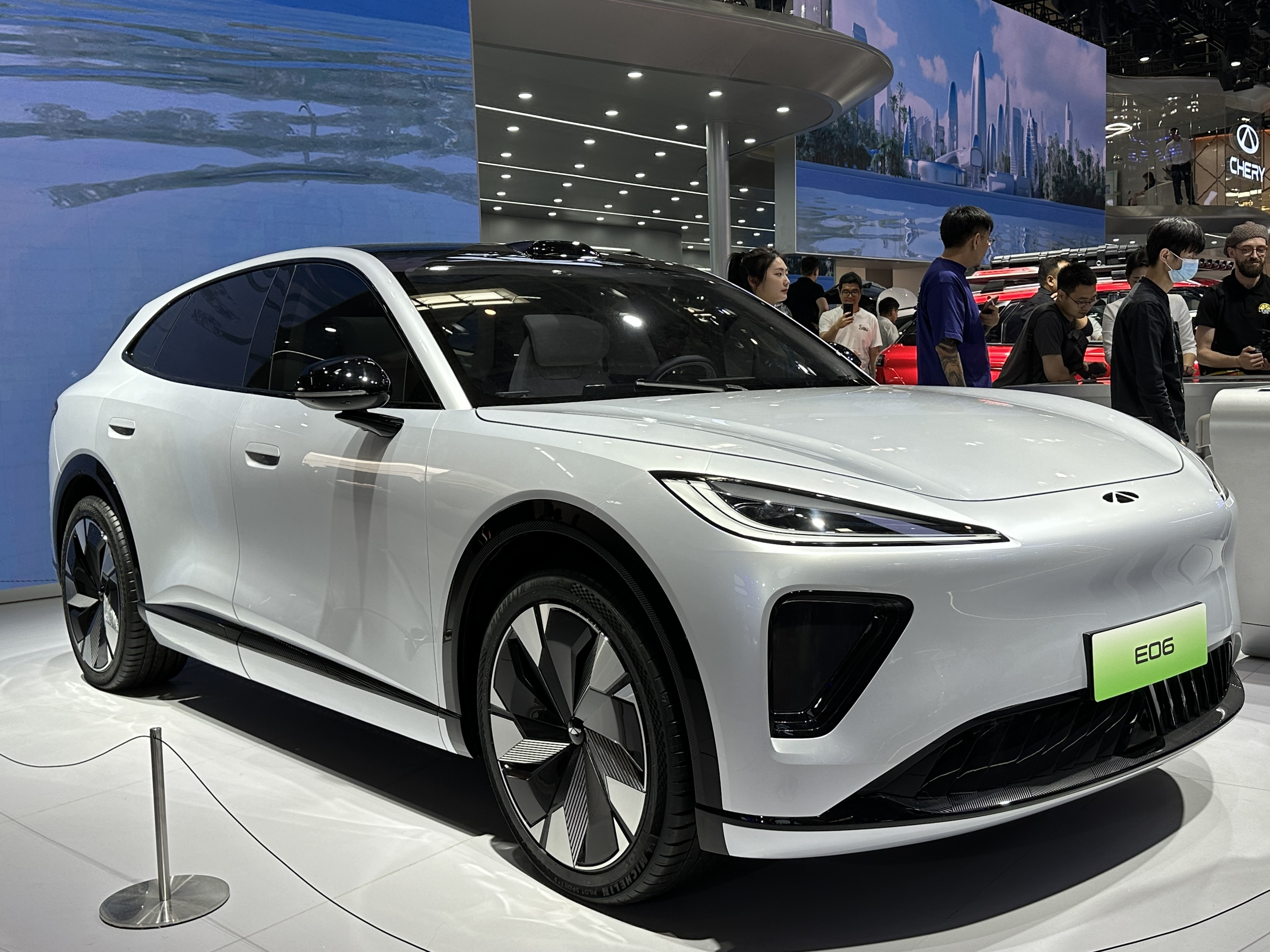
Chery Fulwin E06 Concept

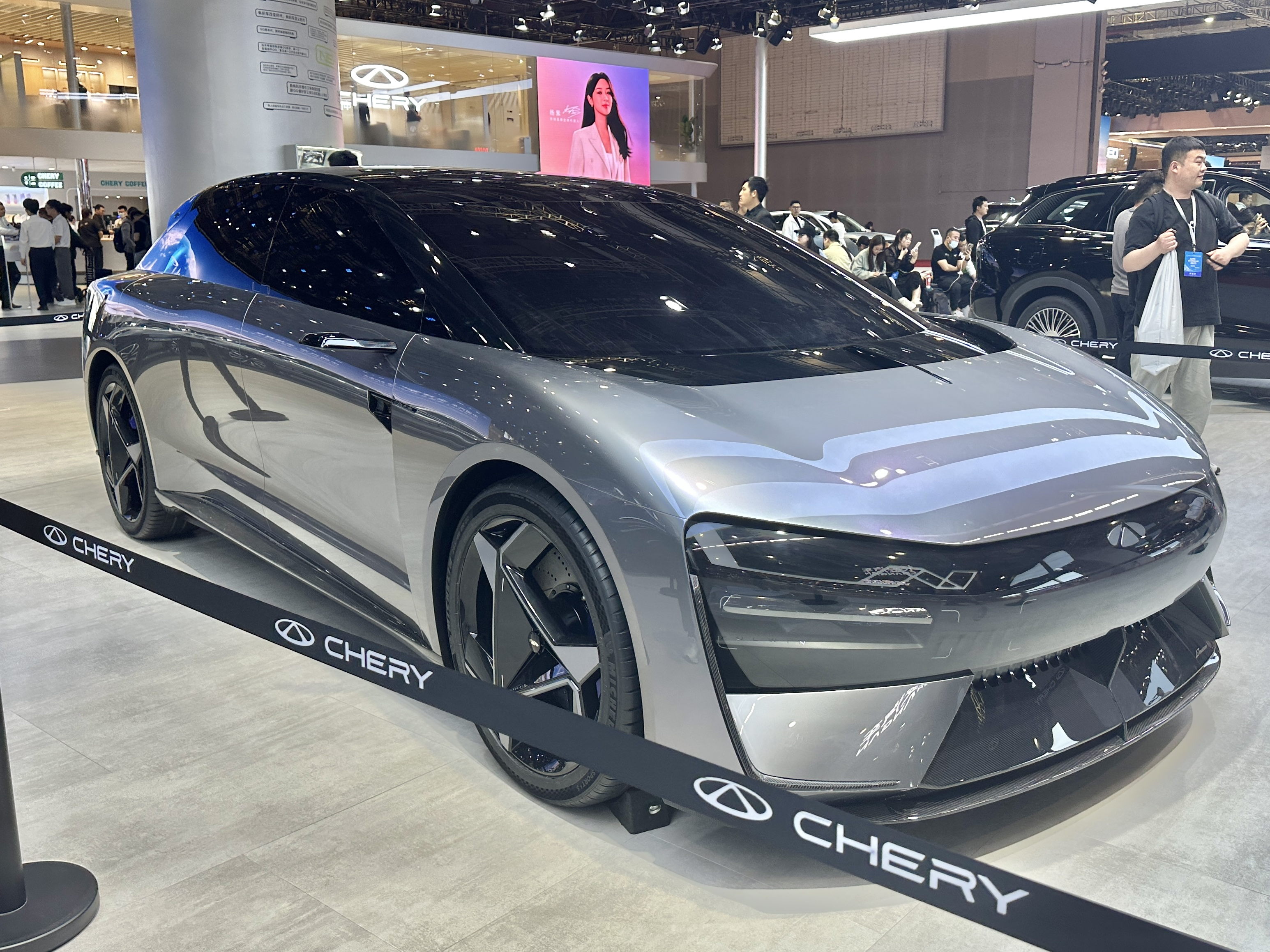
Chery Fulwin Liefeng Concept

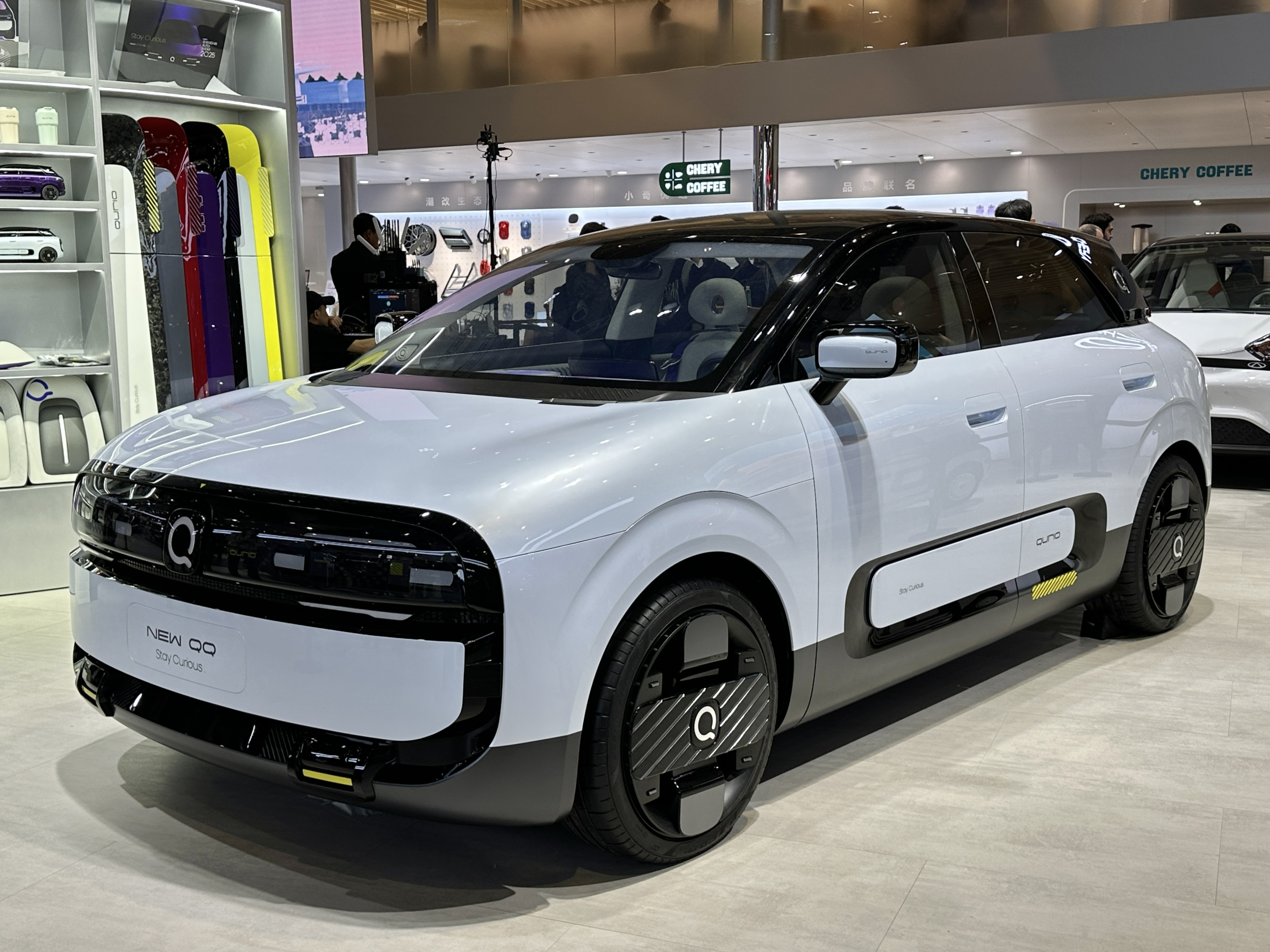
Chery QQ Qurio Concept

=== Exeed ===
- TX concept (2017), a mid-size SUV previewing the production TX, badged as a Chery
- LX concept (2018), a compact electric SUV
- E-IUV (2019), a compact electric SUV
- VX concept (2019), a full-size SUV previewing the production VX
- Stellar (2021), a mid-size electric SUV
- AtlantiX concept (2022), a mid-size SUV previewing the production Yaoguang
- E08 concept (2024), a mid-size MPV
- Sterra Phecda (Tianji) concept (2025), a full-size 6-seater SUV under the Sterra brand
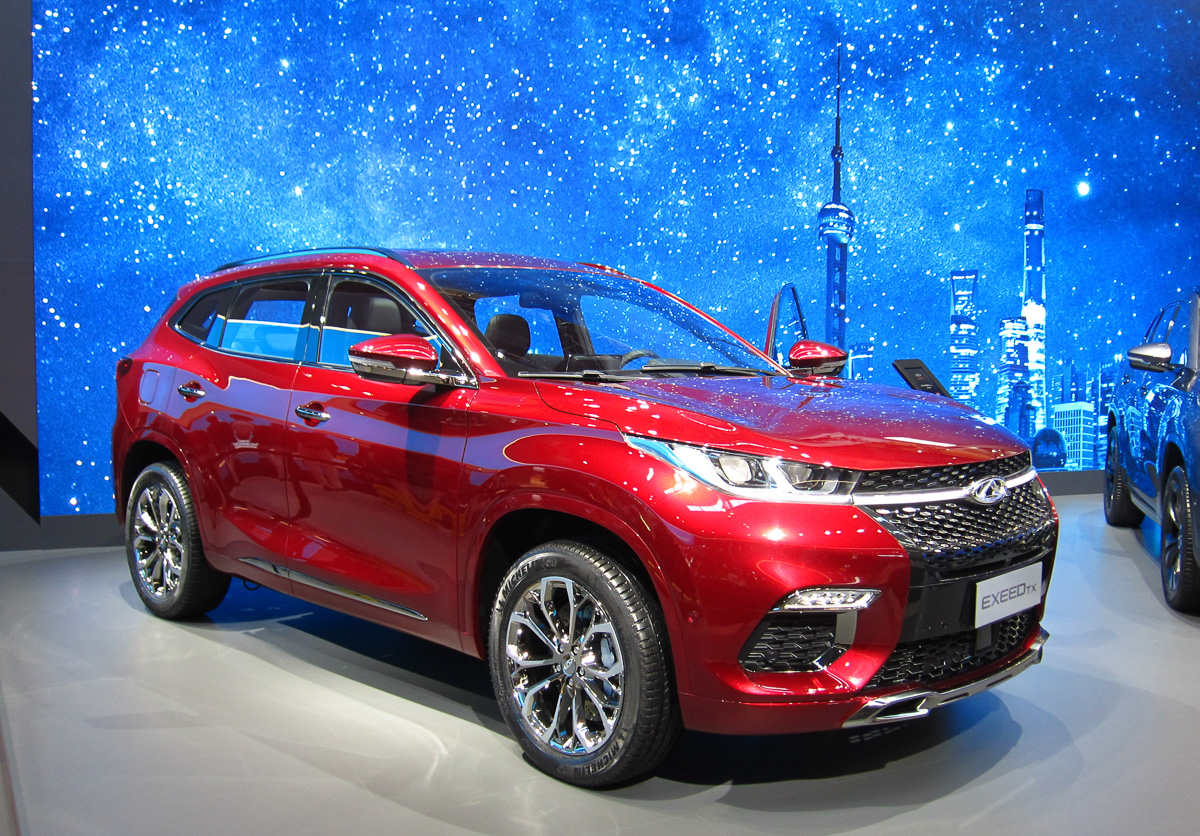
2017 Chery Exeed TX concept

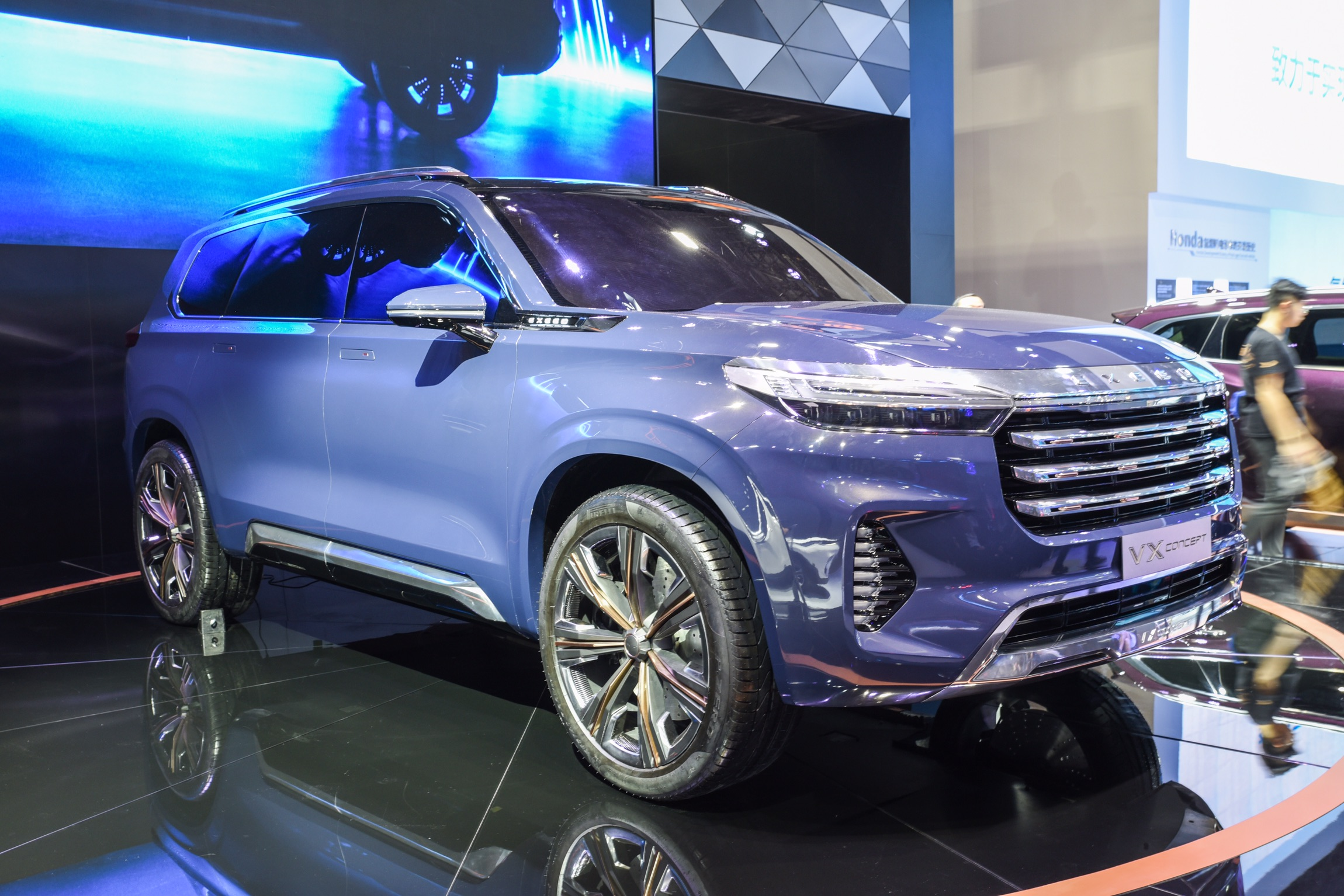
2019 Exeed VX concept

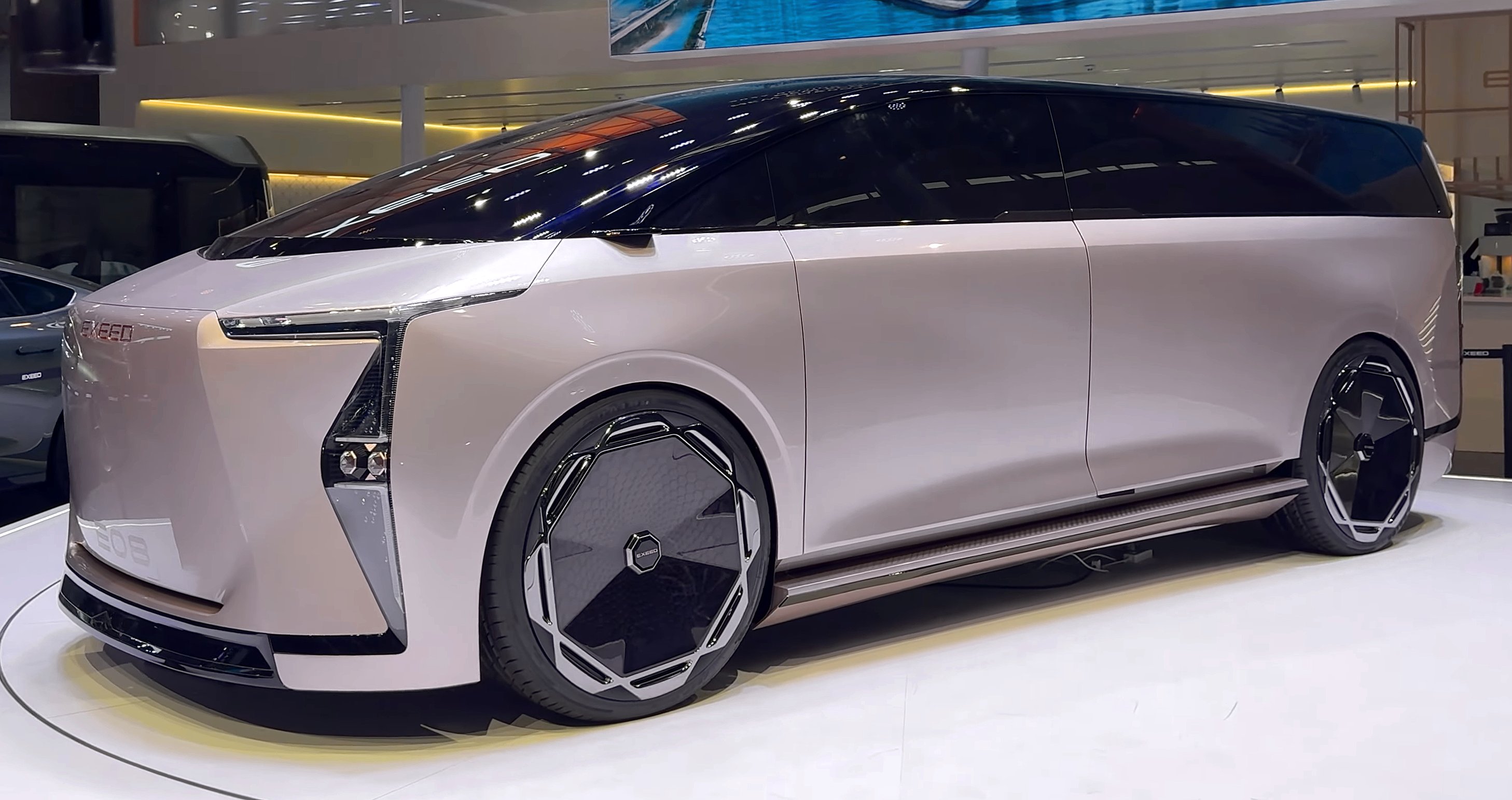
Exeed E08 Concept

=== Jetour ===
- Jetour T-X, Jetour Traveller (T-1) concept
- Jetour T-3, quad-motor, 1341 hp, 1600Nm, front and rear suicide doors, 1400 km range EREV

=== iCar ===
- iCar GT
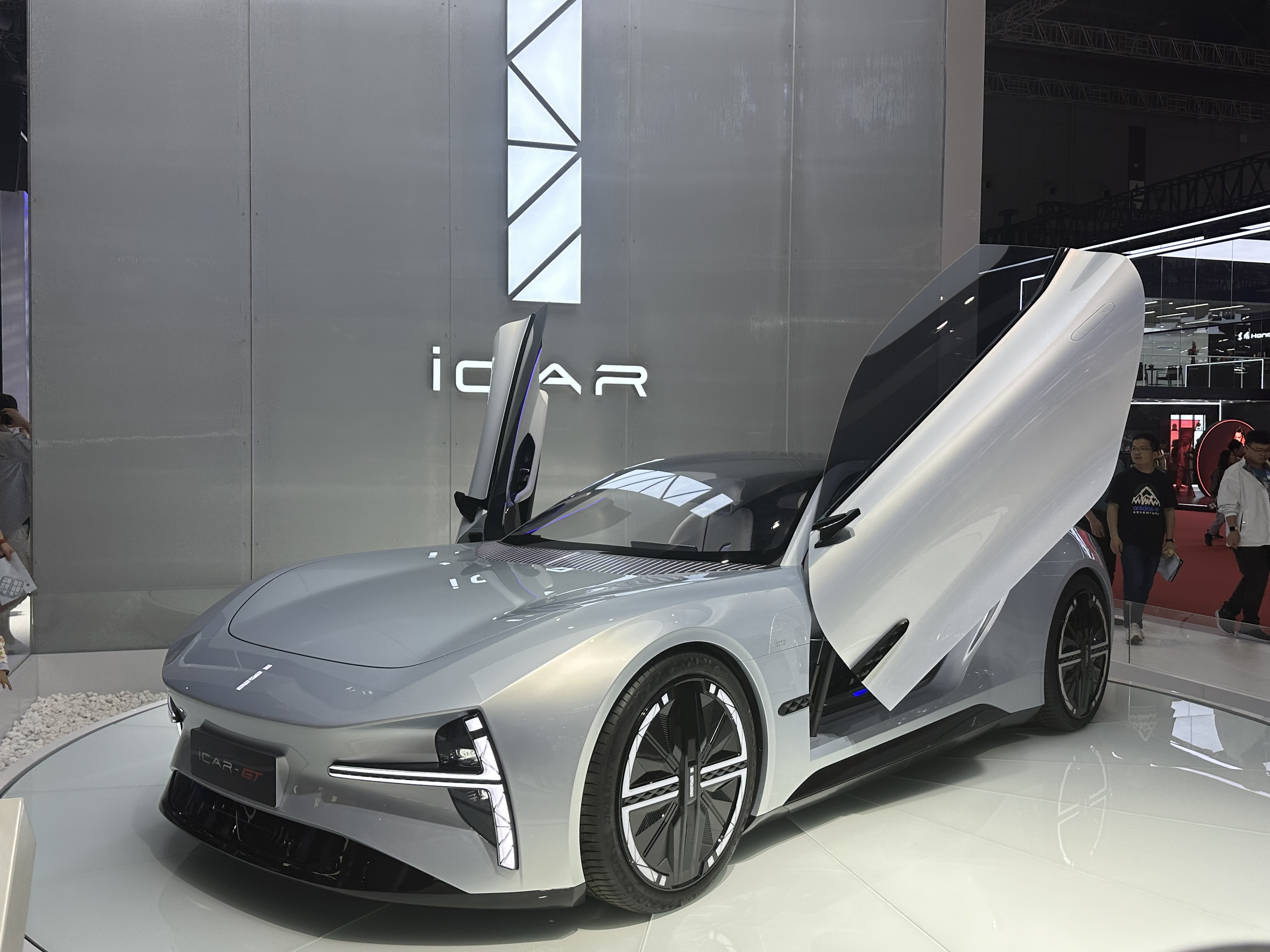
iCar GT
