= Relli =

Relli may refer to:

- Relli River, in Sikkim, India
- Relli Veedhi, Neighborhood in Visakhapatnam, Andhra Pradesh, India
- Relli (caste), an ethnic group in eastern India
- Relli language, an Indo-Aryan language

== See also ==
- Conrad Marca-Relli, American artist
- Reli (disambiguation)
- Rely (disambiguation)
