= Reli =

Reli may refer to:

- Reli people, an ethnic group of India
- Reli language, an Indo-Aryan language

== See also ==
- Rehli, a city in Madhya Pradesh, India
- Relli (disambiguation)
- Rely (disambiguation)
- Raili, a personal name
