= Relly =

Relly is a personal name. Notable people include:

- Gavin Relly (1926–1999), South African businessman, chairman of Anglo American
- Gina Relly (1891–1985), French film actress of the silent era
- James Relly (1722–1778), Welsh Methodist minister, inspired Universalism in the United States
- John Relly Beard (1800–1876), English Unitarian minister, schoolmaster, university lecturer, and translator
- Relly Raffman (1921–1988), composer and professor of music at Clark University, Massachusetts, US
- Rellys (1905–1991), French actor

== See also ==
- Rally (disambiguation)
- Relli (disambiguation)
- Rely (disambiguation)
