= Chery Himla =

Mid-size pickup truck

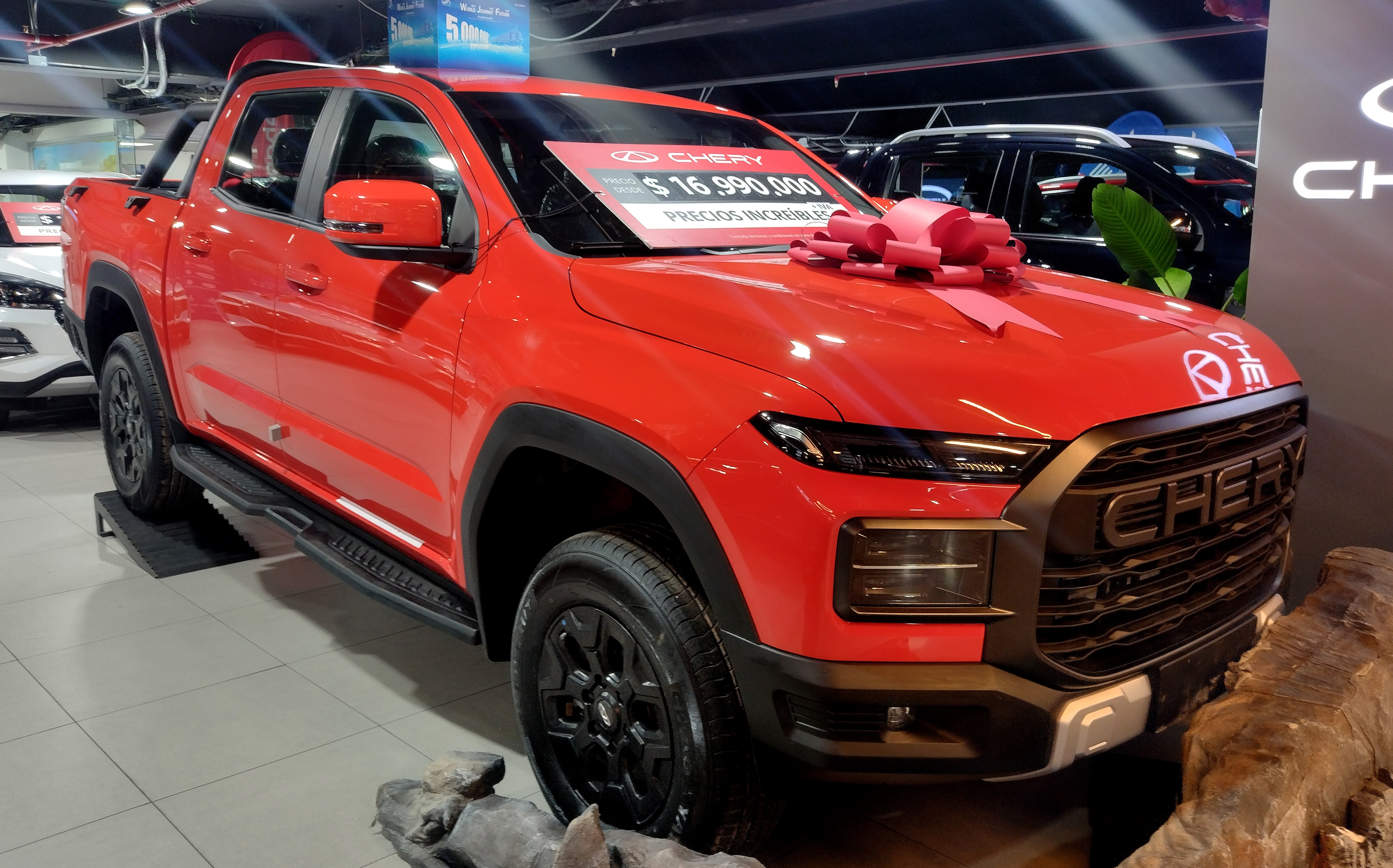

Overview
- Manufacturer: Chery
- Model code: KP11
- Also called: Chery KP11 (prototype); Rely R08 (China)
- Production: 2025–present
- Assembly: China: Wuhu, Anhui

Body and chassis
- Class: Mid-size pickup truck
- Body style: 4-door pickup truck
- Layout: Front-engine, rear-wheel-drive; Front-engine, four-wheel-drive

Powertrain
- Engine: Petrol: 2.4 L I4 turbo; Diesel: 2.3 L I4 turbo
- Transmission: 6-speed manual; 8-speed automatic

Dimensions
- Wheelbase: 3,230 mm (127.2 in)
- Length: 5,335 mm (210.0 in)
- Width: 1,920 mm (75.6 in)
- Height: 1,865 mm (73.4 in)

The Chery Himla is a mid-size pickup truck produced by Chery since 2025. It was showcased at the 2025 Shanghai Auto Show and went on sale in several countries in late 2025.

== Naming ==
The name "Himla" is derived from the Himalayas mountain range. Chery also claims the word is an acronym for High performance, Innovation, Multifunctional, Longevity and All-terrain. In China, the Himla is marketed under the Rely brand as the Rely R08 (Chinese: 威麟R08; pinyin: Wēilín R08) and Rely Reaolc (Chinese: 威麟捷想者; pinyin: Wēilín Jiéxiǎngzhě).

== Markets ==
=== Chile ===
The Himla went on sale in Chile in November 2025 in three variants, all powered by a 2.3-litre turbodiesel engine with 2WD and 4WD options, as well as 6-speed manual and 8-speed automatic transmission options.
