= Rely =

Rely may refer to:

- Rely, Pas-de-Calais, a commune (town) in France
- Rely (tampon), a brand of tampon
- Rely (manufacturer), a car manufacturer owned by Chery

== See also ==
- Rely Zlatarovic, meteorologist
- Relly, a name (including a list of people with the name)
- Relay (disambiguation)
- Reli (disambiguation)
