= Rely (marque) =

Chinese car manufacturer owned by Chery

- Type: Brand
- Founded: 2009; 17 years ago (original incarnation); 2025; 1 year ago (revival)
- Defunct: 2013 (original incarnation)
- Headquarters: Wuhu, China
- Area served: China
- Key people: Yin Tongyue
- Owner: Chery Automobile (100%)
- Website: ka.relyauto.com

Rely (Chinese: 威麟; pinyin: Wēilín) is a Chinese passenger car manufacturer owned by Chery. Headquartered in Wuhu, it operated from 2009 to 2013, and was later revived in 2025 as the company's pickup truck brand. Rely is an abbreviation of rebuild, explore, link, and yield.

== History ==
=== Original incarnation ===
==== Beginnings ====
In the spring of 2009, the Chinese automotive corporation Chery Automobile announced plans to expand its portfolio with two new brands aimed at improving the image of the company, which was previously known mainly for cheap cars. Together with Riich, the Rely branch was also launched. In September 2009, the first products were presented in the form of a mid-size SUV Rely X5, which was originally developed as a product of the parent brand Chery. In the same month, the mid-size station wagon Rely V5 debuted, previously known as the Chery model.

In 2010, the Rely range was expanded with the H-Series family of passenger and delivery models with a design reminiscent of the Japanese Toyota HiAce. That same year, another model was to be launched in the form of the mid-sized Rely V8 minivan, which, however, never made it beyond the prototype stage. In addition, in December 2010, Chery announced that Rely would officially compete in the upcoming Dakar Rally with a specially modified high-performance version of the X5 SUV.

==== Range reduction and profile change ====
Like the related brand Riich, Rely did not achieve the expected popularity. In 2012, the management of the Chery Group decided to discontinue further development of unsuccessful brands, gradually phasing out their presence on the Chinese market. As a result, the X5 SUV, among others, did not go on sale after extensive modernization, disappearing from production in its previous form completely in 2013. That same year, the V5 model was incorporated into the Chery lineup as the Chery Eastar Cross, and Rely's role was eventually reduced to a line offering the H Series. However, the production was taken over by another company, Chery, which produces buses Chery & Wanda Bus, offering this model for the next 8 years until 2021 as one of its products. Then, due to the tightening of exhaust emission standards in China, the H-Series disappeared from the market, and with it - the Rely brand.

=== Revival (2025) ===
In April 2025, Chery announced the revival of its Rely brand as its electric pickup brand, covering ICE, BEV, EREV, and PHEV variants.

The revived Rely marque's first model is the Rely R08, a gasoline, diesel, and battery electric mid-size pickup truck that was presented in June 2025. It is exported as the Chery Himla. It also has an upmarket version known as the Rely Realoq that went on sale on December 10, 2025.

== Products ==
=== Current models ===
- Rely R08 (2025–present), mid-size pickup truck
  - Rely Reaolc (2025–present), upmarket variant of R08
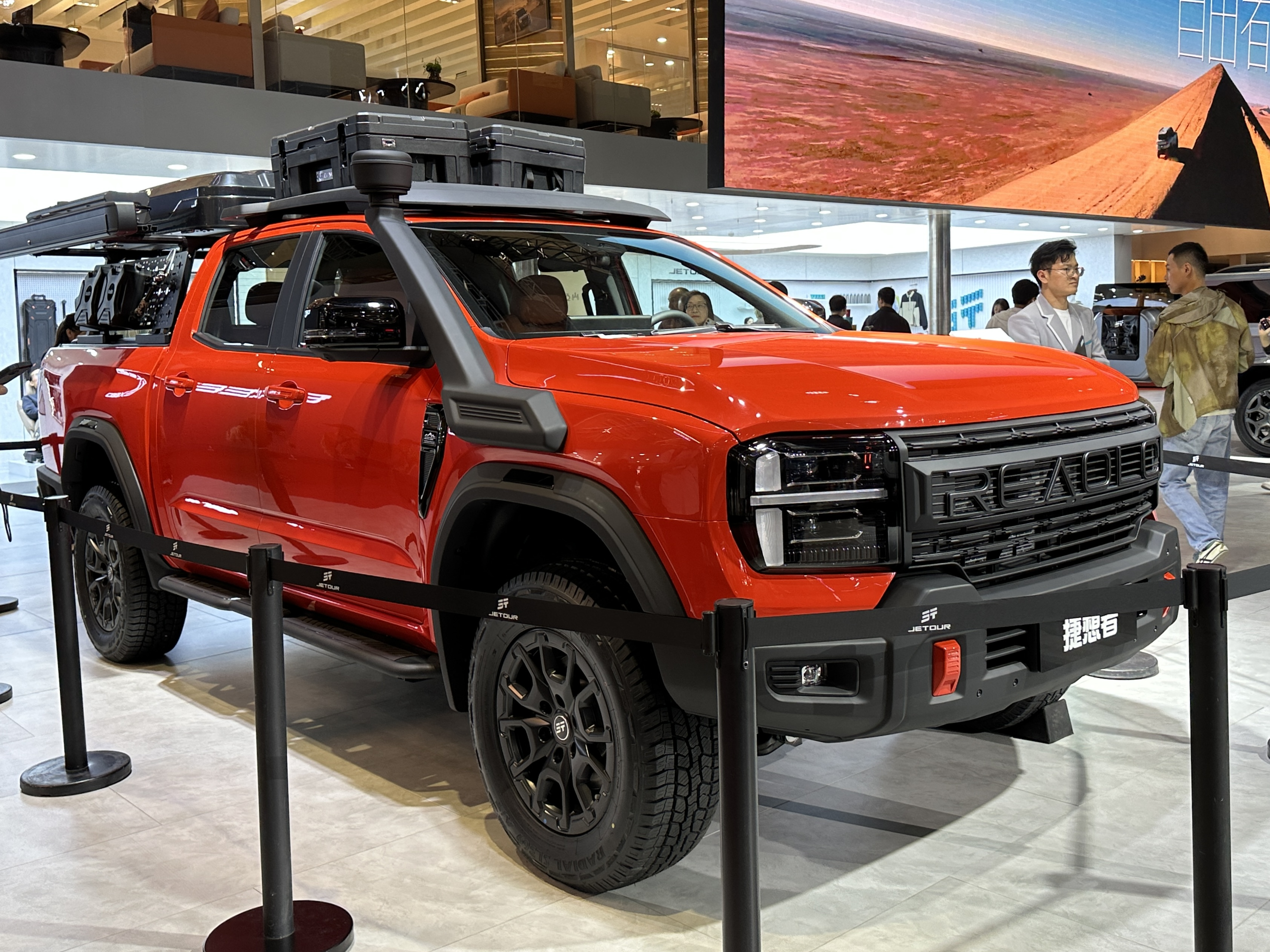
Rely Reaolc

=== Planned models ===
- Rely Hi800: Diesel PHEV 4-door pickup truck. Entering production under the Chery brand as the Chery Stockman in 2026.
- Rely P2X
Rely Hi800

=== Former models ===
- Rely X5 (2009–2012), compact SUV
- Rely V5 (2009–2012), compact MPV
- Rely H series (2010–2021), van
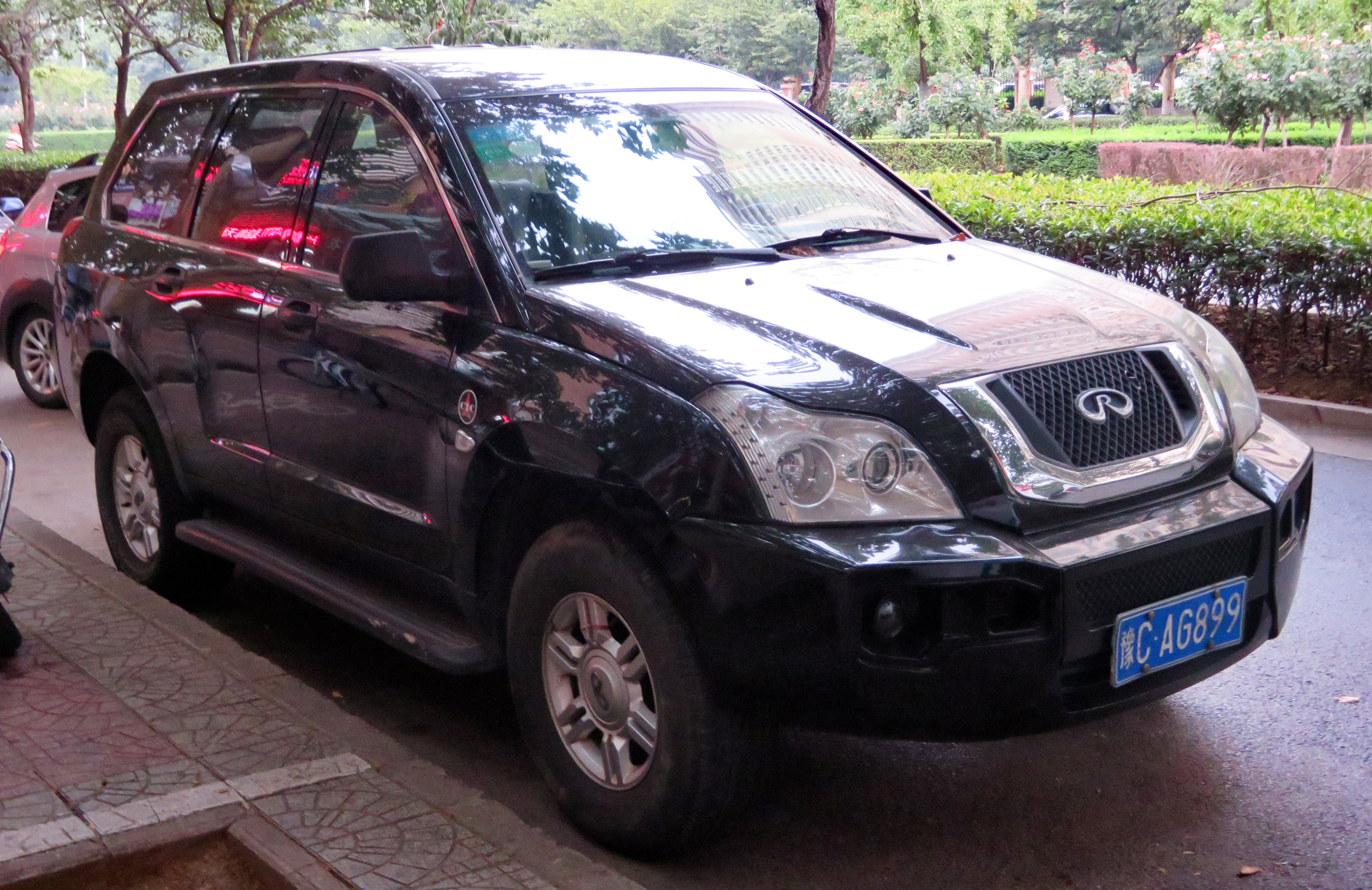
Rely X5

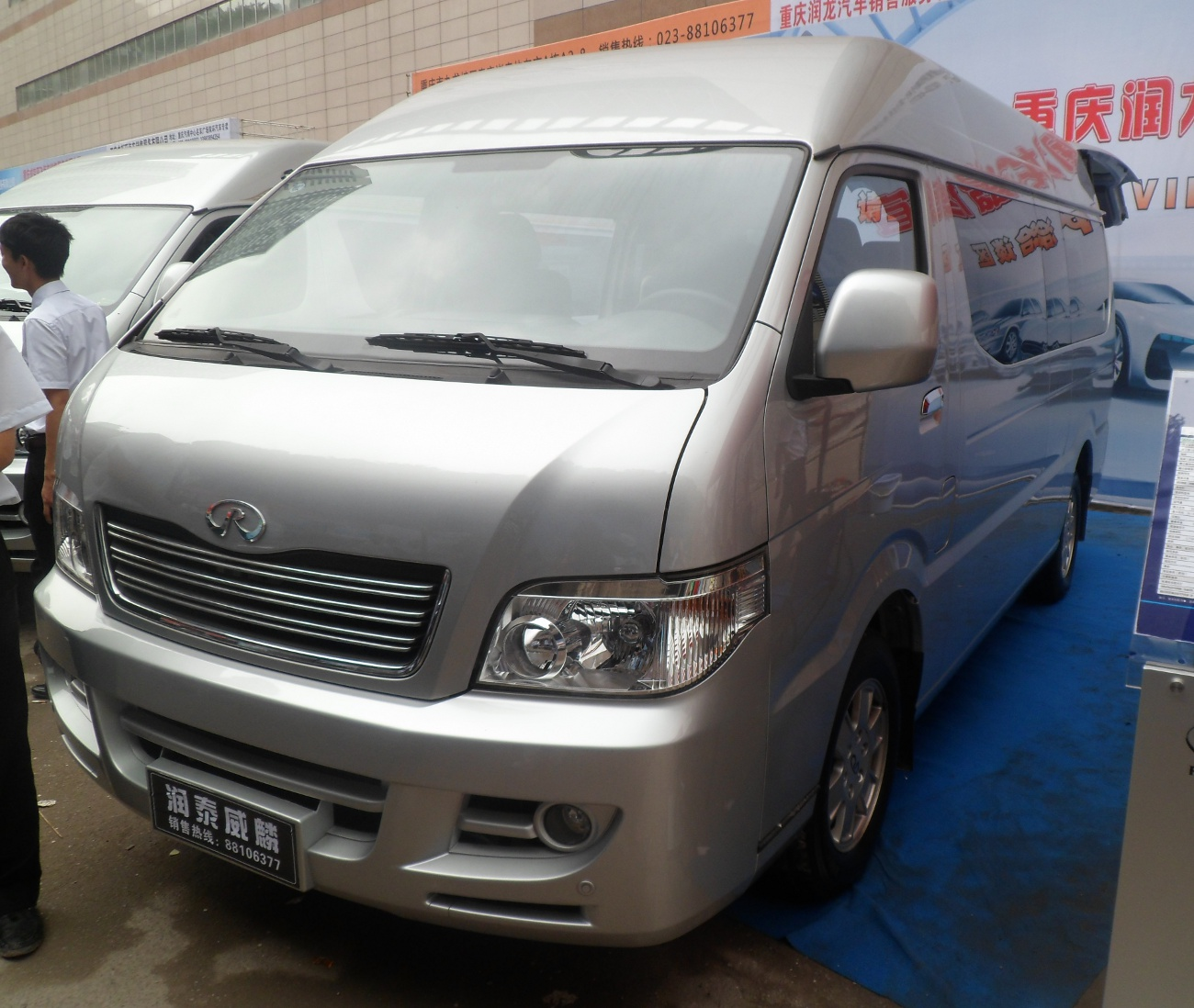
Rely H5

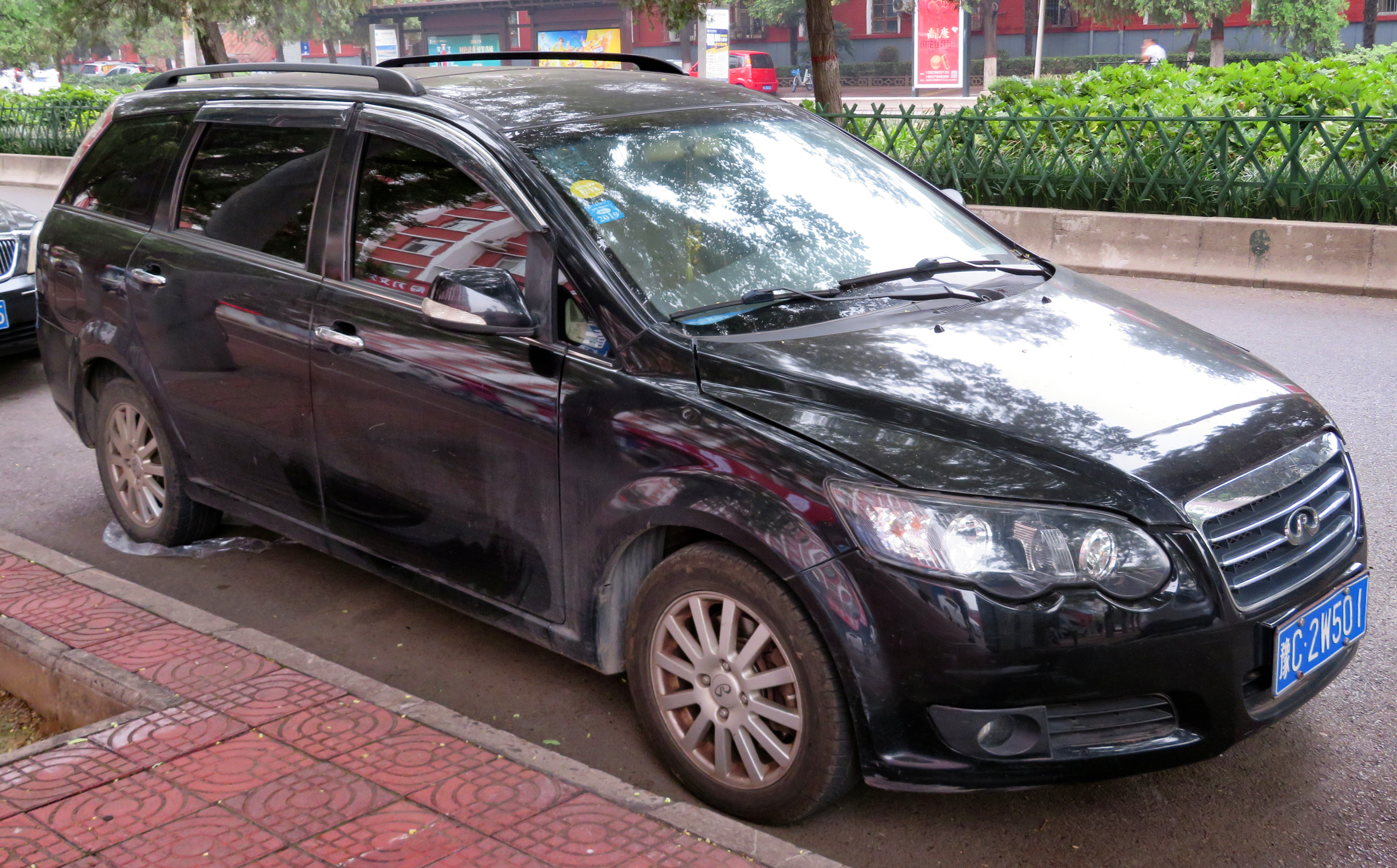
Rely V5

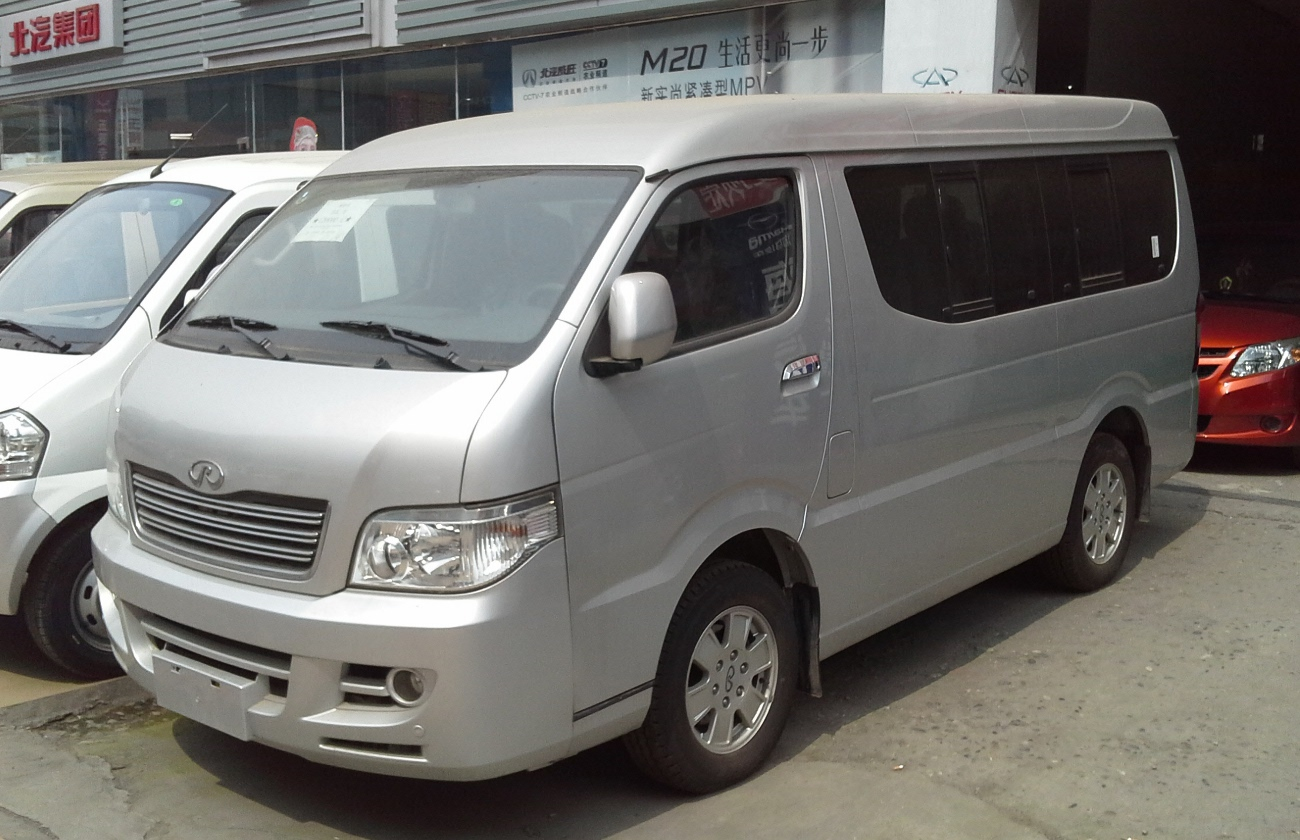
Rely H3

=== Concept vehicles ===
- Rely V8 (2010)
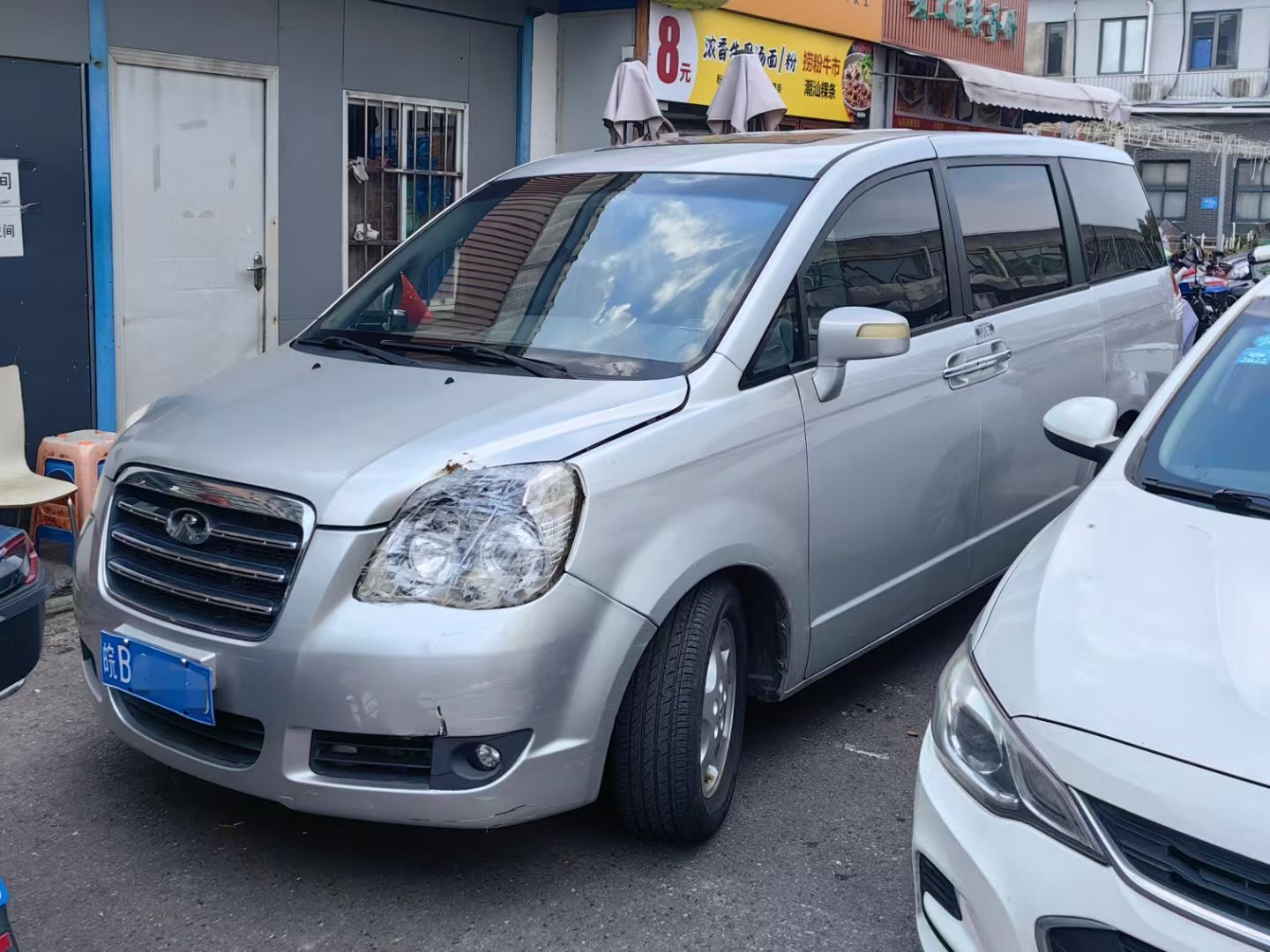
Rely V8
