= Rely X5 =

Chinese compact SUV

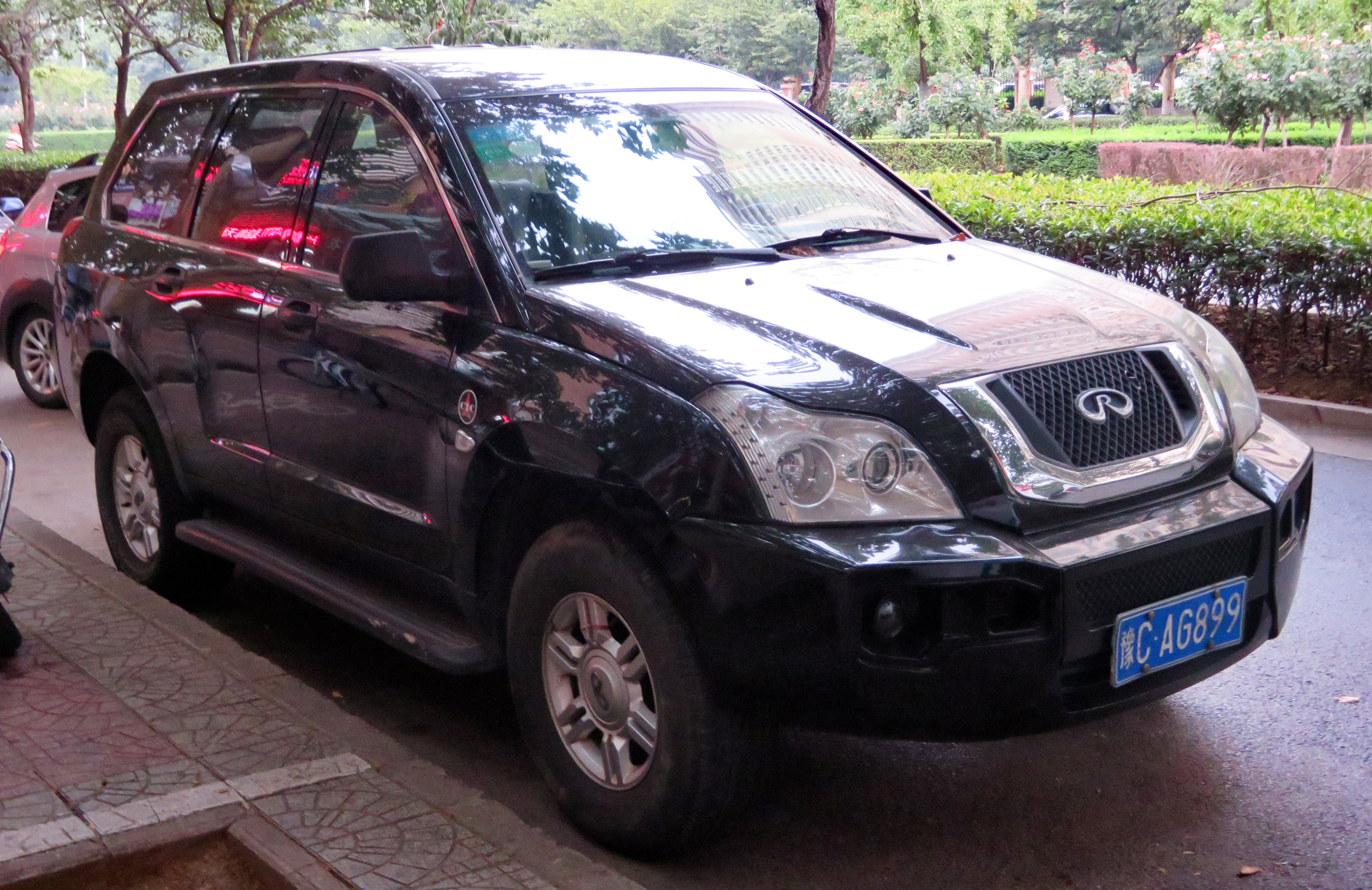

Overview
- Manufacturer: Chery
- Also called: Chery Higgo 3
- Production: 2009–2012
- Assembly: Wuhu, Anhui, China

Body and chassis
- Class: Compact crossover SUV
- Body style: 5-door station wagon
- Layout: Front-engine, rear-wheel-drive; Front-engine, four-wheel-drive

Powertrain
- Engine: 2.0 L SQR484F I4 (gasoline) turbo; 2.0 L SQR484F I4 (gasoline)
- Transmission: 5-speed manual

Dimensions
- Wheelbase: 2,725 mm (107.3 in)
- Length: 4,697 mm (184.9 in)
- Width: 1,878 mm (73.9 in)
- Height: 1,836 mm (72.3 in)

Chronology
- Successor: Chery Tiggo 8

The Rely X5 (Chinese: 威麟X5; pinyin: Wēilín X5) is a compact SUV revealed and released in 2010, produced by Chery under the Rely brand.

== Overview ==
Prices of the Rely X5 at launch was 159,800 yuan with the price adjusted later to range from 109,800 yuan to 141,800 yuan. The original Rely X5 was revealed with only a 2.0-litre engine mated to a manual transmission available. However, a 2.0-litre turbo engine with a 4-speed automatic gearbox was added later in 2011. A facelift was also planned, with details released in 2011, but a facelift never happened and the car was soon discontinued.

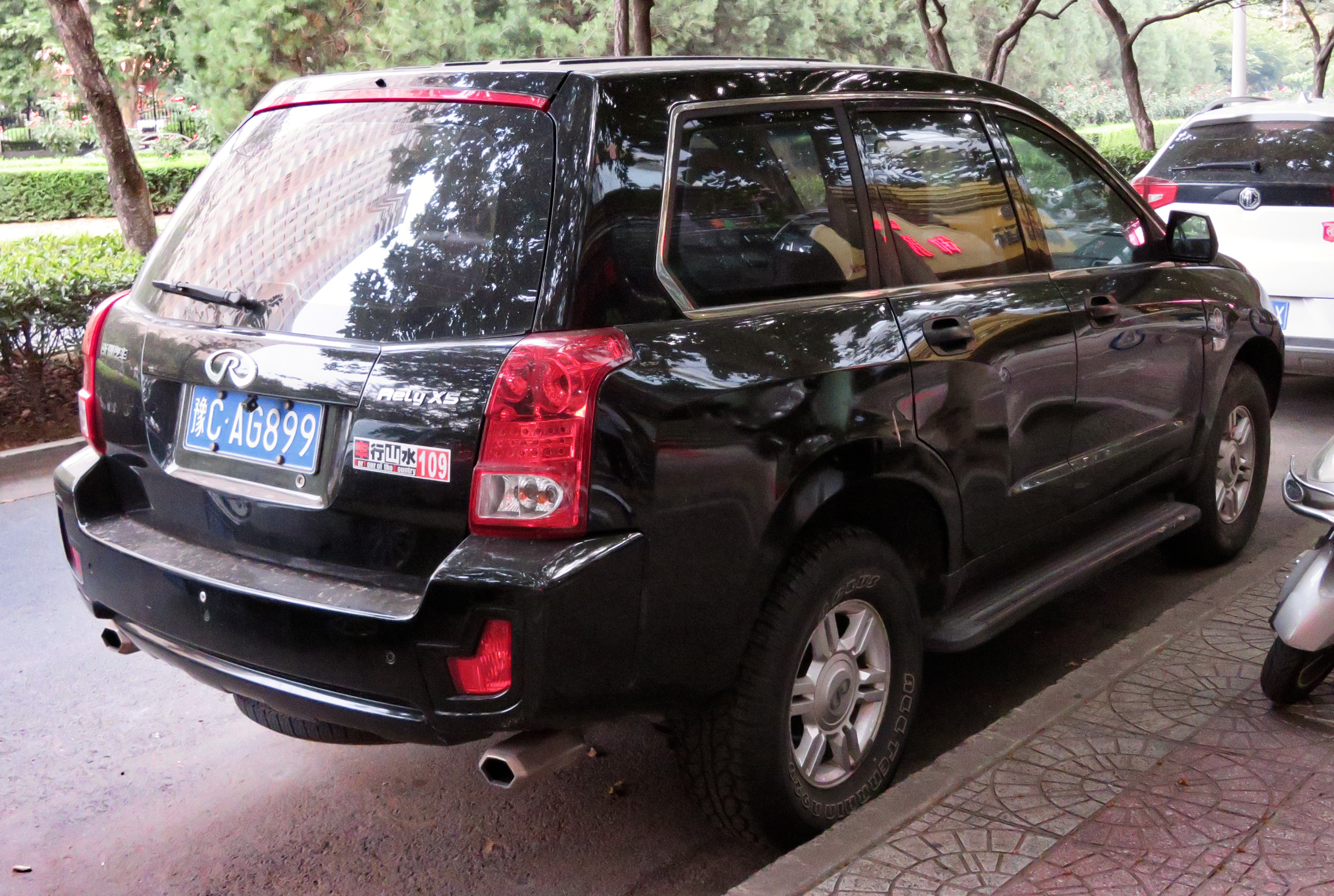
Rely X5 rear
