= Rely R08 =

Mid-size pickup truck

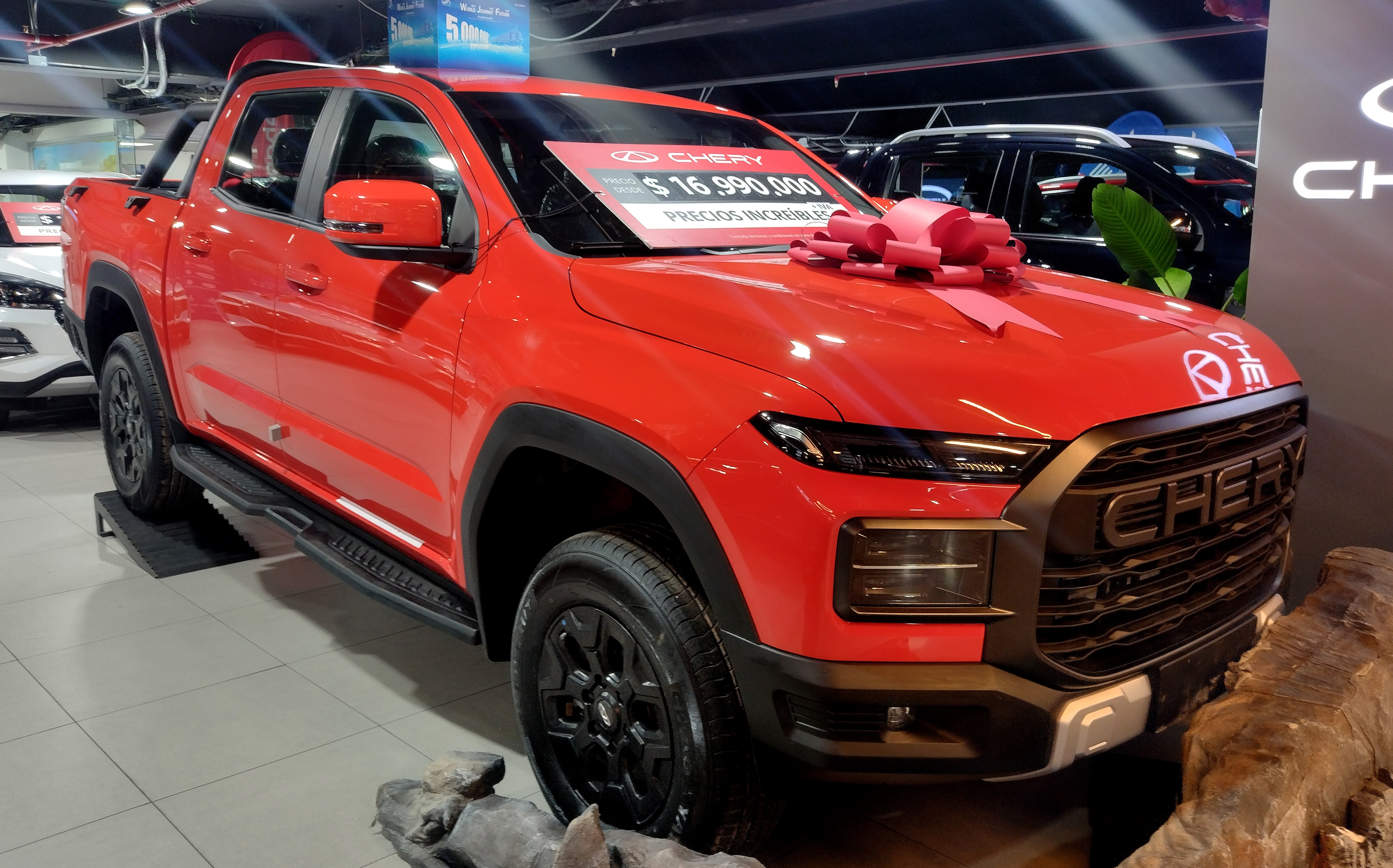
- Chery Himla

Overview
- Manufacturer: Rely (Chery)
- Model code: KP11
- Also called: Chery Himla (export); Jetour Reaolc (pre-production); Rely R8 (Argentina, Uruguay)
- Production: 2025–present
- Assembly: China: Wuhu, Anhui

Body and chassis
- Class: Mid-size pickup truck
- Body style: 4-door pickup truck
- Layout: Front-engine, four-wheel-drive

Powertrain
- Engine: Petrol: 2.4 L I4 turbo; Diesel: 2.3 T I4 turbo
- Electric motor: 2 electric motors
- Transmission: 8-speed automatic; Stepless DHT transmission (hybrid)
- Hybrid drivetrain: Plug-in hybrid
- Battery: Permanent magnet synchronous reluctance

Dimensions
- Wheelbase: 3,230 mm (127.2 in) (short-wheelbase); 3,510 mm (138.2 in) (long-wheelbase)
- Length: 5,370 mm (211.4 in) (short-wheelbase); 5,650 mm (222.4 in) (long-wheelbase)
- Width: 1,960 mm (77.2 in)
- Height: 1,945 mm (76.6 in) (short-wheelbase); 1,915 mm (75.4 in) (long-wheelbase)

The Rely R08 (Chinese: 威麟R08; pinyin: Wēilín R08) and Rely Reaolc (Chinese: 威麟捷想者; pinyin: Wēilín Jiéxiǎngzhě) is a mid-size pickup truck produced by Chery since 2025. It was showcased at the 2025 Shanghai Auto Show and is planned to release in 2025.

== Overview ==
The R08 was presented in June 2025. It is sales commenced in China on 20 September 2025.

The Reaolc was previewed by the Jetour Reaolc at the 2025 Shanghai Auto Show. Sales commenced on December 10, 2025.

== Rely R08 Pro (Rely Reaolc) ==
A more hardcore variant named the Rely R08 Pro was announced in April 2026, featuring off-road ready accessories and lock differentials in the front and rear as standard. Styling wise, the R08 Pro also features an exclusive front end design taken from the Jetour Reaolc prototype to differentiate from the regular R08 models. The R08 Pro went on sale on April 17, 2026.

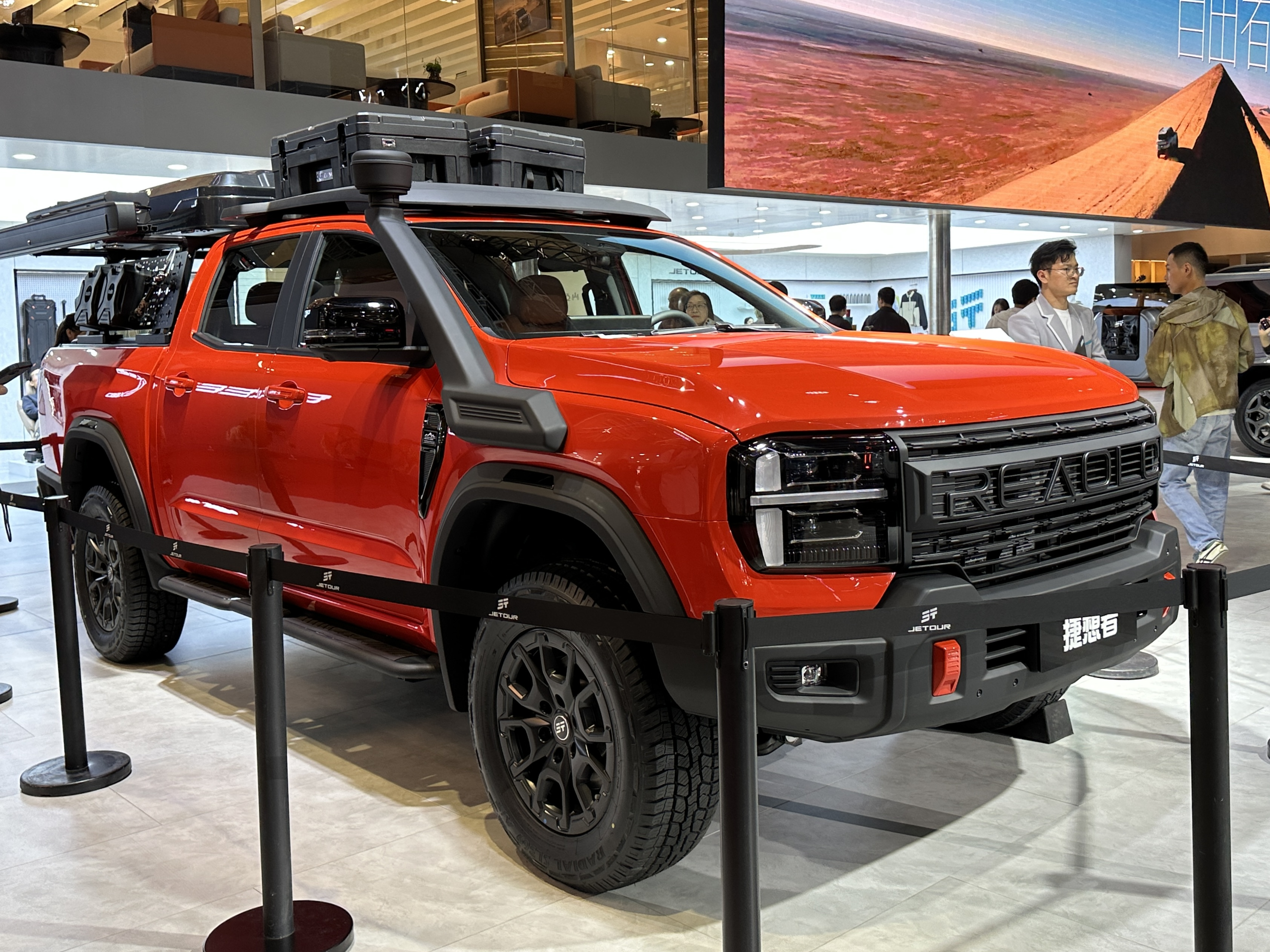
Jetour Reaolc

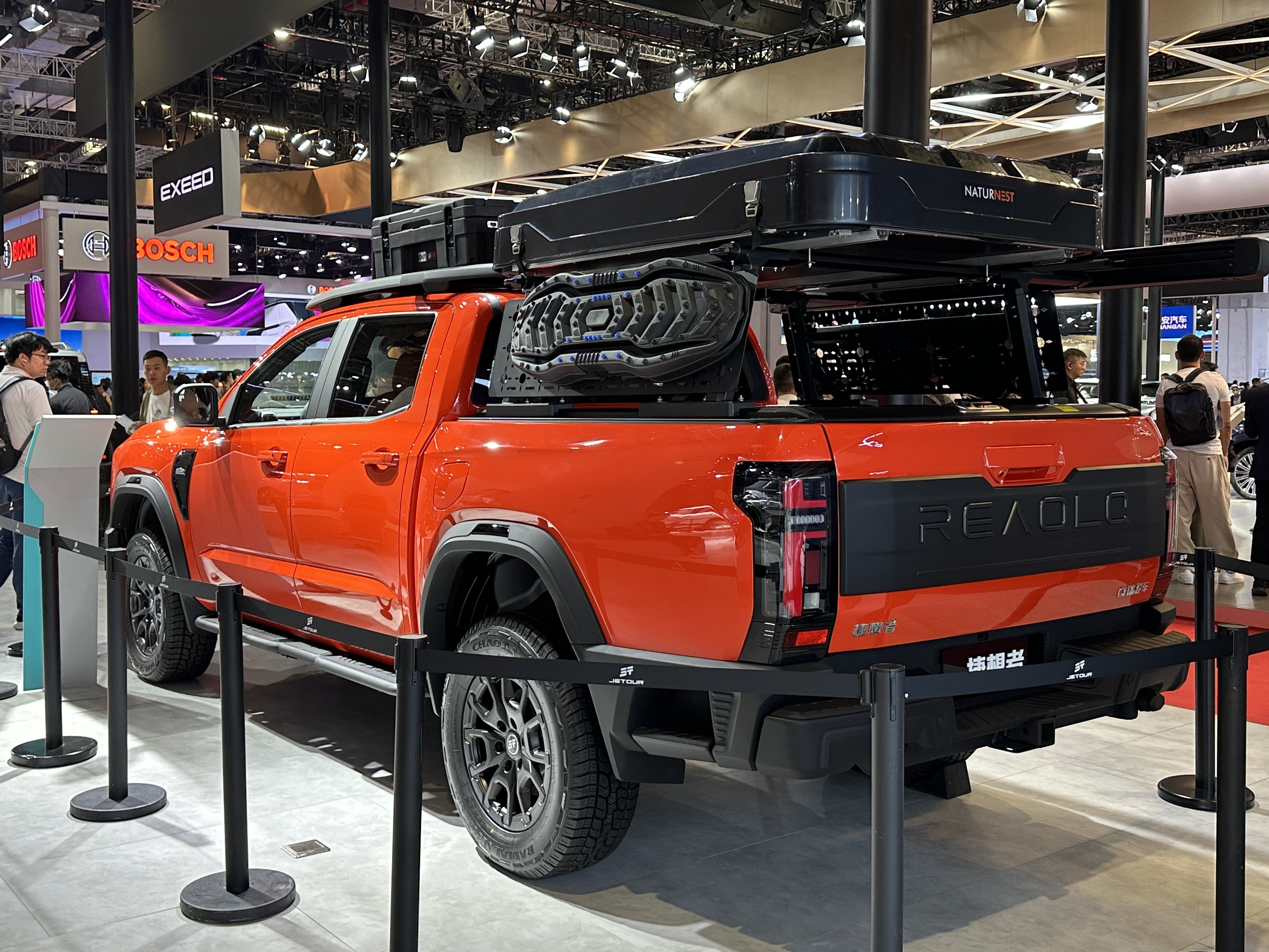
Rear view

== Export markets ==
The Chery Himla is the export market name for the Rely R08 mid-size pickup truck produced by Chery since 2025. It was showcased at the 2025 Shanghai Auto Show and went on sale in several countries in late 2025.

The name "Himla" is derived from the Himalayas mountain range. Chery also claims the word is an acronym for High performance, Innovation, Multifunctional, Longevity and All-terrain. In China, the Himla is marketed under the Rely brand as the Rely R08 (Chinese: 威麟R08; pinyin: Wēilín R08) and Rely Reaolc (Chinese: 威麟捷想者; pinyin: Wēilín Jiéxiǎngzhě).

== Markets ==
=== Argentina ===
The R8 went on sale in Argentina in May 2026 in three variants; Comfort, Luxury and Limited, all powered by a 2.3-litre turbodiesel engine, only with 4WD, as well as 6-speed manual and 8-speed automatic transmission options.

=== Chile ===
The Himla went on sale in Chile in November 2025 in three variants, all powered by a 2.3-litre turbodiesel engine with 2WD and 4WD options, as well as 6-speed manual and 8-speed automatic transmission options.

=== Uruguay ===
The R8 went on sale in Uruguay in March 2026 in three variants; Comfort, Luxury and Limited, powered by a 2.3-litre turbodiesel engine and Comfort is powered by a 2.4-litre petrol, except for Comfort (2WD) all variants are equipped with 4WD, as well as 6-speed manual and 8-speed automatic transmission options.
