= Chery Stockman =

Diesel plug-in hybrid mid-size pickup

- The Chery Stockman at Everything Electric Sydney 2026.

Overview
- Manufacturer: Chery
- Model code: KP31
- Also called: Rely Hi800 (China); Chery Grootman (South Africa)
- Production: Q1 2027 (to commence)
- Assembly: China: Wuhu, Anhui; South Africa: Rosslyn (Chery South Africa)

Body and chassis
- Class: Mid-size pickup truck
- Body style: 4-door pickup truck
- Layout: Front-engine, four-wheel-drive
- Platform: Kaitan Architecture

Powertrain
- Engine: Diesel plug-in hybrid: 2.5 L turbo I4; Petrol plug-in hybrid: 2.0 L I4
- Power output: 350 kW (476 PS; 469 hp) (diesel PHEV); 395 kW (537 PS; 530 hp) (petrol PHEV)
- Transmission: 4-speed DHT
- Hybrid drivetrain: Series-parallel
- Battery: 34 kWh LFP
- Electric range: 100 km (62 mi) (WLTP); 96 km (60 mi) (with all-terrain tyres)

Dimensions
- Wheelbase: 3,250 mm (128.0 in)
- Length: 5,610 mm (220.9 in) (KP31); 5,450 mm (214.6 in) (production)
- Width: 1,920 mm (75.6 in) (KP31); 2,010 mm (79.1 in) (production)
- Height: 1,925 mm (75.8 in) (KP31); 1,890 mm (74.4 in) (production)
- Kerb weight: 2,690–2,735 kg (5,930–6,030 lb)

The Chery Stockman is an upcoming diesel and petrol plug-in hybrid mid-size pickup truck to be produced by Chery. It is claimed to be the first ever diesel plug-in hybrid pickup truck.

== Overview ==
Interior

The Stockman was previewed by the Rely P3X concept first showed at the Chengdu Auto Show on 2 September 2025. It was the first concept to be revealed under the Rely brand. The Stockman is a double-cab pickup truck using a ladder frame chassis and is also the first model to use the Kaitan Architecture.

A near-production model was revealed in Australia on 23 February 2026, tentatively named the Chery KP31.

=== Name ===
In March 2026, Chery announced a competition for Australians to name the vehicle, starting on 12 March at 12:00 p.m. Australian Eastern Daylight Saving Time (UTC+11:00), and closing at 11:50 p.m. AEDT on 26 March, with the winner to receive the first unit shipped to Australia. In May Chery released a shortlist of the 20,000 names submitted: Outrider, Orca, Ironbark, Bushwalker, Stockman, Longreach, Ridgeback, Terra, and Mate. Australians then got to vote on which name was chosen.

On 17 June 2026, Chery unveiled that the name in Australia is the Chery Stockman, named after the Australian term for people who mind livestock on a station. The name was also previously used in Australia by Suzuki for a Sierra-based pickup truck. The Chinese name Rely Hi800, stands for Hybrid intelligence.

In August 2026 Chery launched a competition in South Africa to name the vehicle. The submitted names were shortlisted to: Bakkie, Brahman, Chief, Grootman, Nduna, and Orca. On 1 October 2026, Chery unveiled the name in South Africa is the Chery Grootman (lit. 'big man' or 'great man'), a South African expression of respect to a person.

=== Design ===
The Stockman's front end has been compared to that of the sixth-generation Ford Bronco because of its circular headlights, flat front end, and full-width grille. The back uses vertical taillights and "CHERY" stamped into black plastic trim on the tailgate. Box-flared fenders are utilised.

Front view

Rear view

=== Features ===
The Stockman uses front and rear skid plates, includes, recovery points, a snorkel, and six-lug wheels. Integrated steps are also used in the rear. The bed was designed to sit high above the chassis so that it has minimal intrusion from the wheel arches. Large side-view mirrors and traditional door handles are also utilised.

== Powertrain and chassis ==
The Stockman will be available in two plug-in hybrid powertrains: diesel and petrol. It will have a 34kWh lithium iron phosphate battery, which is located towards the back of the frame. The Stockman's diesel engine has a thermal efficiency of 47% and claims to be 10% more economical than that of a conventional diesel engine. It has a 4-speed dedicated hybrid transmission.

The diesel plug-in hybrid uses a 2.5-litre turbo-diesel inline 4 engine producing 140 kW (188 hp) and 450 N⋅m (332 lb⋅ft) of torque, paired with two electric motors making a combined 350 kW (469 hp) and 800 N⋅m (590 lb⋅ft) of torque. The petrol plug-in hybrid variant will produce 395 kW (530 hp) and 1,000 N⋅m (738 lb⋅ft) of torque.

The Stockman will use front, centre, and rear locking differentials and a low-range gearbox. The front will use double wishbone suspension, with the rear using leaf springs. It has a 30 degree approach angle and 25 departure angle.

It will have a 750 kg (1,653 lb) unbraked towing capacity, a 3,495 kg (7,705 lb) braked towing capacity, a gross vehicle mass of 3,500 kg (7,716 lb), gross combined mass of 6,500 kg (14,330 lb). The fuel consumption 1 L/100 km (282 mpg_{‑imp}) with highway tyres and 1.1 L/100 km (257 mpg_{‑imp}) with all-terrain tyres on the combined cycle with a 80-litre fuel tank. It has a payload capacity between 765 kg (1,687 lb) and 810 kg (1,786 lb).

== Markets ==
=== Australia ===
The Chery Stockman will release in Australia on 1 February 2027 as a diesel plug-in hybrid, and in the second half of 2027 a petrol plug-in hybrid variant will release. The Australian engineering firm Premcar assisted in local testing and tuning of the Stockman, and partnered with Ironman 4x4 to develop accessories for the vehicle. Online reservations opened on 1 October 2026.

It will launch with two trims: Urban and Ultimate. The Ultimate adds a front locking differential, front fog lights, roof rails, rear privacy and acoustic glass, 360 degree camera, heads-up display and a digital rearview mirror. The Urban will have a 810 kg (1,786 lb) payload capacity with the Ultimate having a 800 kg (1,764 lb) payload capacity with highway tyres and 765 kg (1,687 lb) with optional all-terrian tyres.

=== China ===
The Rely Hi800 will release in China with coil spring rear suspension.

=== South Africa ===
The Chery Grootman will release in South Africa in the first quarter of 2027.
