= Chery Wujie Pro =

Battery electric city car

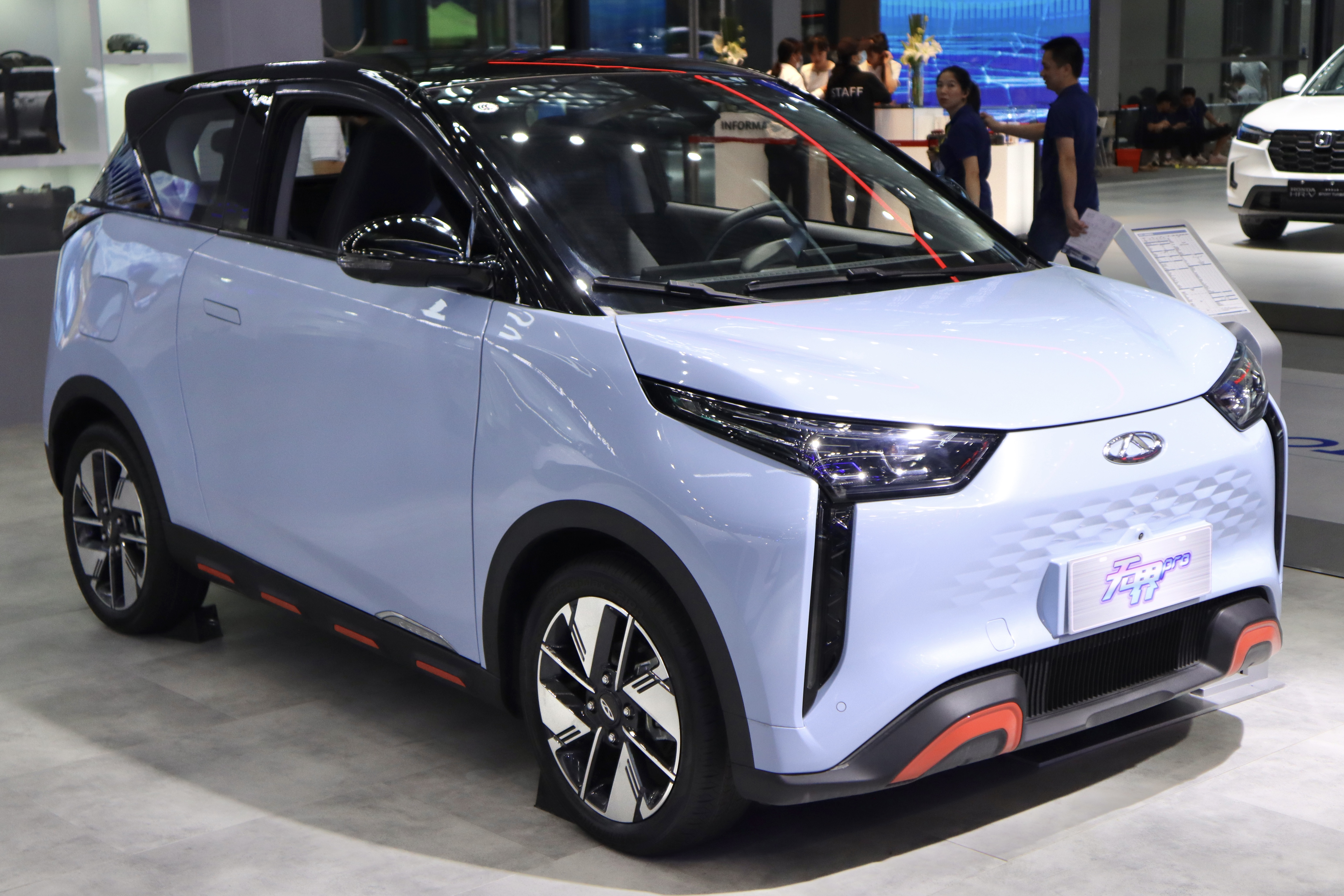

Overview
- Manufacturer: Chery
- Also called: Chery QQ Wujie Pro; Chery Unbounded Pro; MASADA EQ1 Pro (South Korea); Aiqar eQ1 Pro (Armenia, Bolivia, Cambodia, Curaçao, Georgia, Uzbekistan)
- Production: 2022–2023 (China); 2022–present (export)
- Assembly: China: Wuhu, Anhui

Body and chassis
- Class: City car (A)
- Body style: 3-door hatchback
- Layout: Rear-motor, rear-wheel drive

Powertrain
- Electric motor: 55 kW permanent magnet synchronous electric motor; 70 kW permanent magnet synchronous electric motor
- Battery: at least 28.86 kWh; 40.3 kWh

Dimensions
- Wheelbase: 2,160 mm (85.0 in)
- Length: 3,402 mm (133.9 in)
- Width: 1,680 mm (66.1 in)
- Height: 1,550–1,559 mm (61.0–61.4 in)
- Curb weight: 970–1,015 kg (2,138–2,238 lb)

The Chery Wujie Pro (Chinese: 奇瑞 无界 Pro) is a battery electric city car that is manufactured by the NEV division of Chinese manufacturer Chery. The car is released under the iCar Ecosystem product series.

== Overview ==
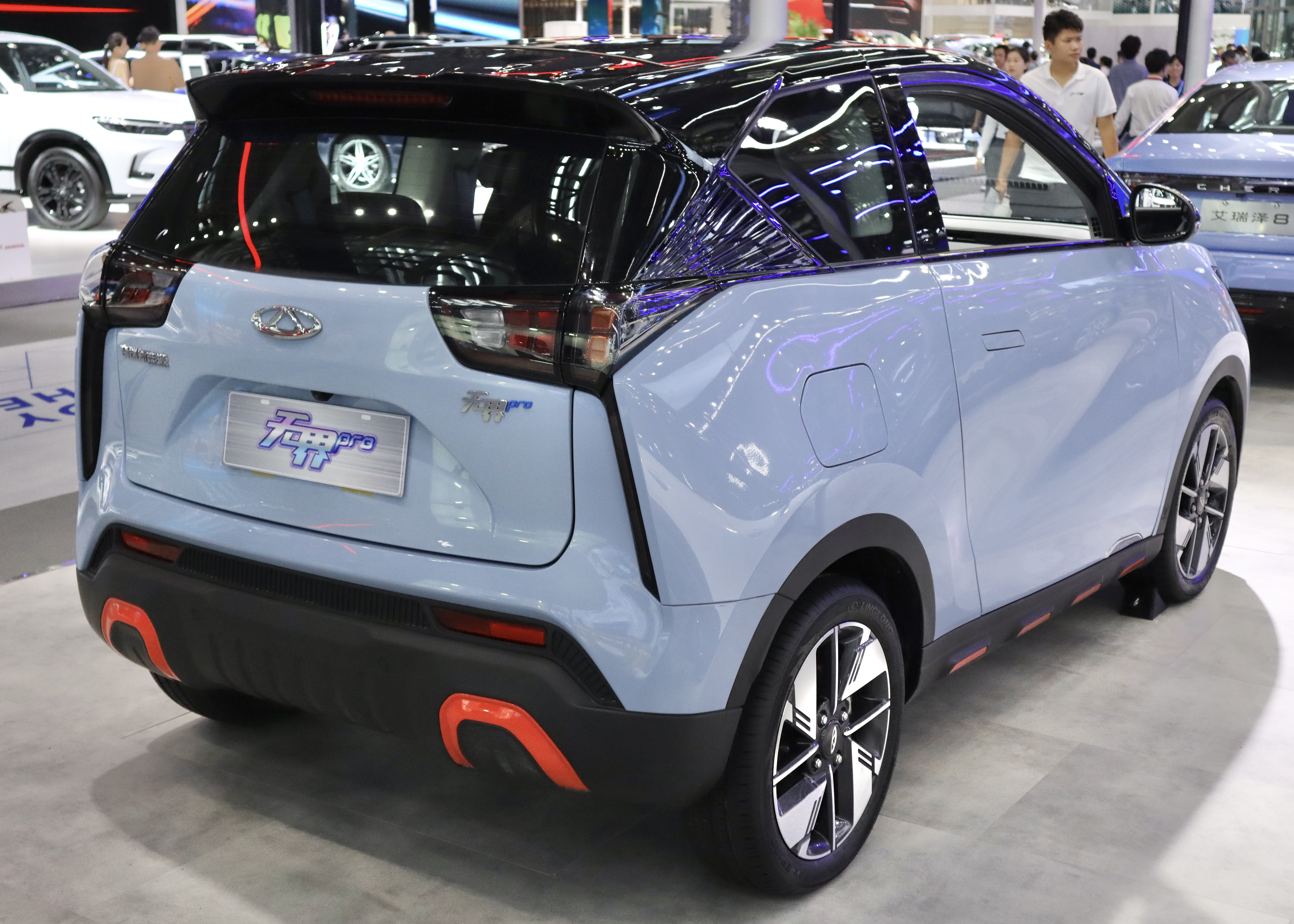
Rear view

The Chery Wujie Pro is powered by a rear mounted permanent magnet synchronous electric motor putting out 55 kW (74 hp) and 150 N⋅m (111 lb⋅ft) and a driving range of 301 km for the base model. The top speed of the Wujie Pro is 120 km/h (75 mph). A second trim level with a maximum output of 70 kW and maximum torque of 120 Nm with the top speed of 125 km/h and driving range of 408 km is also available. At the time of the launch, the price of the Chery Wujie Pro was from 79,990 yuan to 101,900 yuan (from $11,842 to $15,086), including subsidies for new energy vehicles in China. DC fast charging for the Chery Wujie Pro refills the battery from 30% to 80% state of charge within 30 minutes.

The interior of the Wujie Pro features a 12.9-inch landscape screen and a 7.0-inch digital instrument panel. The Chery Wujie Pro is powered by a 3rd-generation Qualcomm 6155 chip built for automobiles, which enables a 540-degree panoramic view of the surrounding, meaning that a 360-degree picture and 180-degree of the front could be combined.
