= Relis =

Indo Aryan caste and ethnic group from South India

Reli people
Regions with significant populations
- Andhra Pradesh, Telangana, Odisha, West Bengal, Chhattisgarh

Languages
- Reli, Odia, Telugu, Hindi

Religion
- Hinduism

Relli (also Reli, Relly, or Raily) are an Indo-aryan ethnic group and caste who reside in the states of Andhra Pradesh, Telangana, Odisha, West Bengal, and Chhattisgarh. They are classified as a Scheduled Caste.

== Demographics ==
The Relli people are mainly distributed in coastal districts, such as Srikakulam, Vizianagaram, Visakhapatnam, East Godavari, West Godavari, Krishna, Guntur, Prakasam, Nellore, and Chittoor of Andhra Pradesh, Jagdalpur of Chhattisgarh and the Koraput, Nabarangpur, Rayagada, Kolkata, Howrah, Howrah Maidan, Salkia, Shalimar, Mominpur, Titagarh, Khardah, and Bandel.

According to the 2001 Census, Relli and Mehtar's population is 206,053 in Andhra Pradesh, 37 in Chhattisgarh, and 8,357 in Odisha respectively. Rellis constitutes 1.67% of the total Scheduled Caste population of United Andhra Pradesh in 2001.

== Occupation ==
The primary occupation of the Relli people in Andhra Pradesh is the collection and sale of fruits, vegetables, seeds, and grass. Some are labourers and manual scavengers. A few are in government service while the Relli of Odisha and Chhattisgarh trade in salt, rice, vegetables, goats, and hens on a small scale. Agriculture is also pursued. They are listed as Scheduled Castes.

== Language ==
Relli people speak the Relli language as their mother tongue and is close to Odia. The Relli people speak the Telugu language in Andhra Pradesh when conversing with outsiders. The Relli people speak the Hindi language in Chhattisgarh and In kolkata Bengali language

The 2001 Census stated that there were 21,238 speakers of the Relli language in Andhra Pradesh, 37 in Chhattisgarh, and 4014 in Odisha. Further breakdown to the district level is as follows (2001 Census): Vizianagaram (AP) 7,893; Visakhapatnam (AP) 4,301; East Godavari (AP) 3,079; Krishna (AP) 3,085; Srikakulam (AP) 1,796; Guntur (AP) 597, Koraput (OD) 1607; Rayagada (OD) 907 and Nabarangpur (OD) 1500, in Odisha, Jagdalpur (CG) 37, in Chhattisgarh.

== See also ==
- List of Scheduled Castes in Andhra Pradesh & Telangana
