= Reli language =

Indo-Aryan language of Eastern and Southern India

Reli
- ରେଲି ଲୋକ (Reli Lōkā)
- Native to: India
- Region: Andhra Pradesh, Odisha
- Ethnicity: Relli
- Native speakers: 13,000 (2011 census)
- Language family: Indo-European: Indo-Iranian; Indo-Aryan; Eastern; Odia; Reli
- Writing system: Odia, Telugu

Language codes
- ISO 639-3: rei
- Glottolog: reli1238

Reli, or Relli, is a language spoken primarily by the Reli people of Eastern and Southern India closely related to, and possibly a dialect of Odia.
