= Rely H-series =

Chinese light commercial van produced by Chery

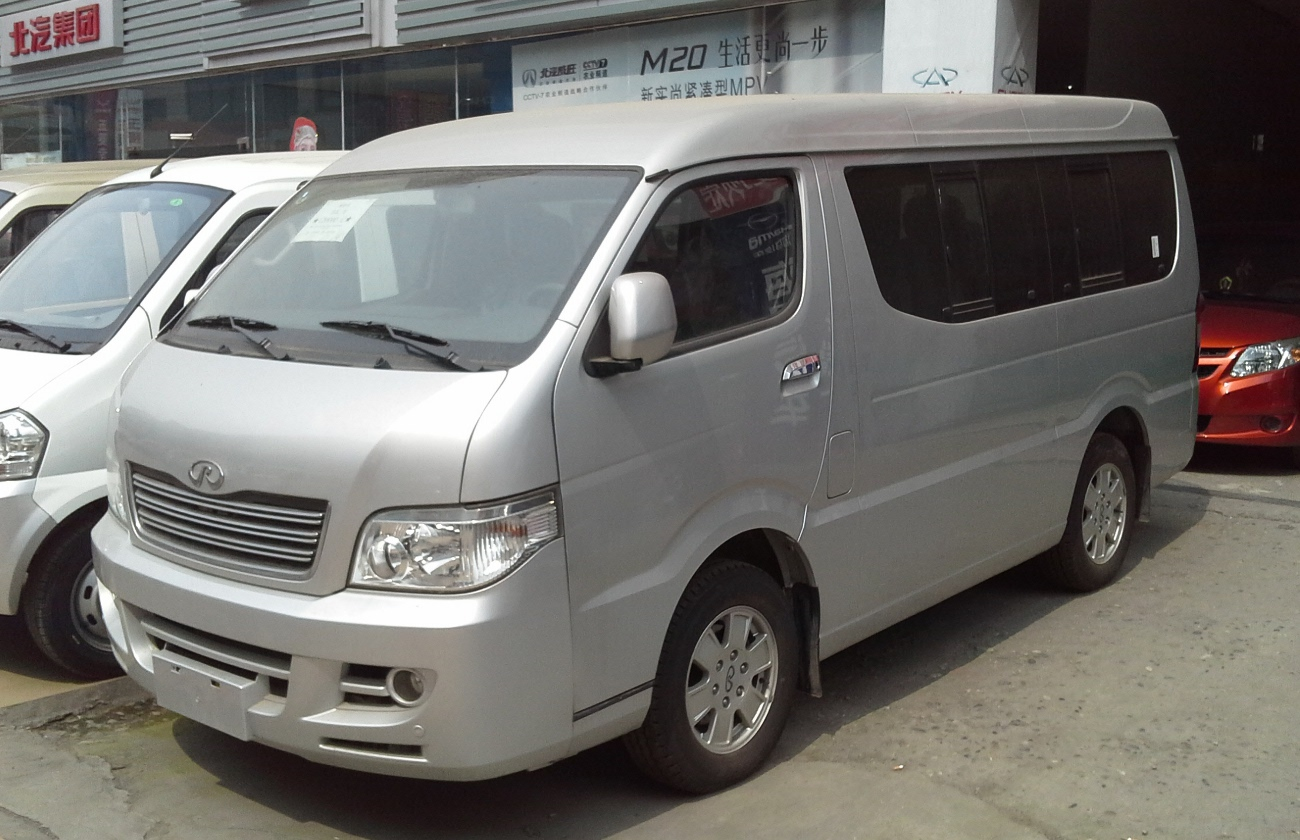

Overview
- Also called: Rely H3; Rely H5; Rely H6; Chery Transcom
- Production: 2010–2021
- Assembly: China: Anhui

Body and chassis
- Body style: 3-door van/minibus; 4-door van/minibus; 5-door van/minibus
- Layout: Front-engine, rear-wheel-drive / four-wheel drive

Powertrain
- Engine: 2.0 L turbo I4; 2.7 L turbo I4 (H6); 2.8 L turbo diesel I4 (H6)
- Transmission: 5-speed manual

Dimensions
- Wheelbase: H3: 2,570 mm (101.2 in); H5: 3,110 mm (122.4 in); H6: 3,690 mm (145.3 in)
- Length: H3: 4,870 mm (191.7 in); H5: 5,410 mm (213.0 in); H6: 5,990 mm (235.8 in)
- Width: 1,920 mm (75.6 in)
- Height: H3: 2,110 mm (83.1 in); H5: 2,290 mm (90.2 in); H6: 2,314 mm (91.1 in)
- Curb weight: 2,035–2,195 kg (4,486–4,839 lb)

The Rely H-series including the Rely H3, Rely H5, and Rely H6 is a series of light commercial van produced by the Chinese automobile manufacturer Chery under the Wanda (万达) branch and branded under the Rely (威麟) brand, a marque launched by Chery in 2009. First launched in 2010, the Rely H series has since been available in a wide range of body configurations, including a minivan/MPV, minibus, panel van, crew van, and an ambulance.

== Overview ==
The Rely H5 was released by Chery Auto on March 26, 2010, with deliveries of the Rely H3 models beginning on November 3, 2010. However, no significant upgrades were made to either the H3 or H5 models after their 2010 release. Due to low demand, Chery ceased production of the H3 in 2013, although leftover stocks are still available at some dealerships as of early 2014.

The Rely H3 offers up to 12 seating positions, compared to 14 seats in the Rely H5. Both models share all essential body parts and styling features, with the only difference being their size.

Both the Rely H3 and H5 are powered by a turbocharged 2.0-liter engine paired with a 5-speed manual transmission.

Chery also offered a slightly updated and larger model called the H6 until 2018, featuring engine options including a 2.7-litre turbo inline-four gasoline engine and a 2.8-litre turbo diesel inline-four engine.

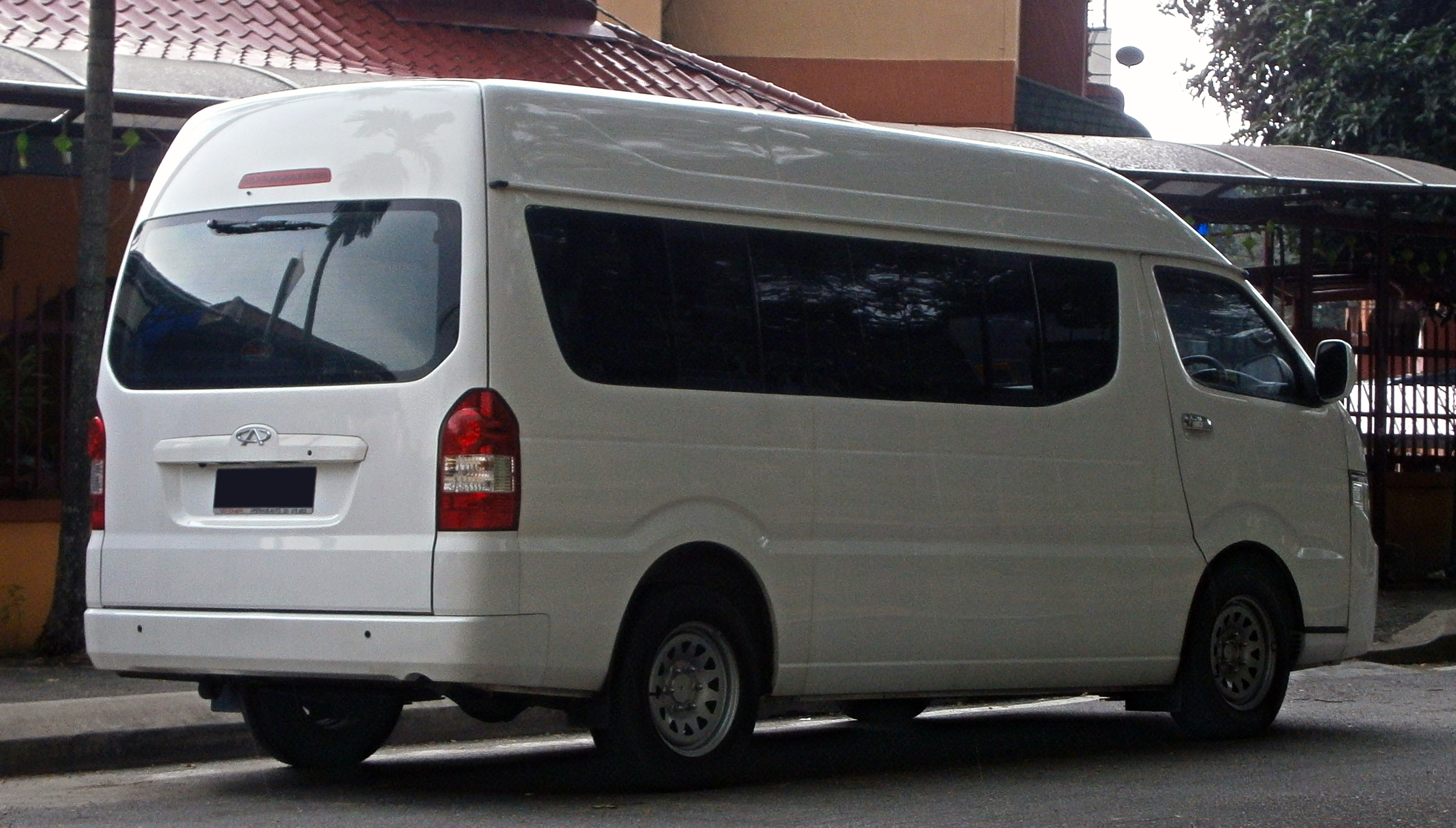
Chery Transcom rear

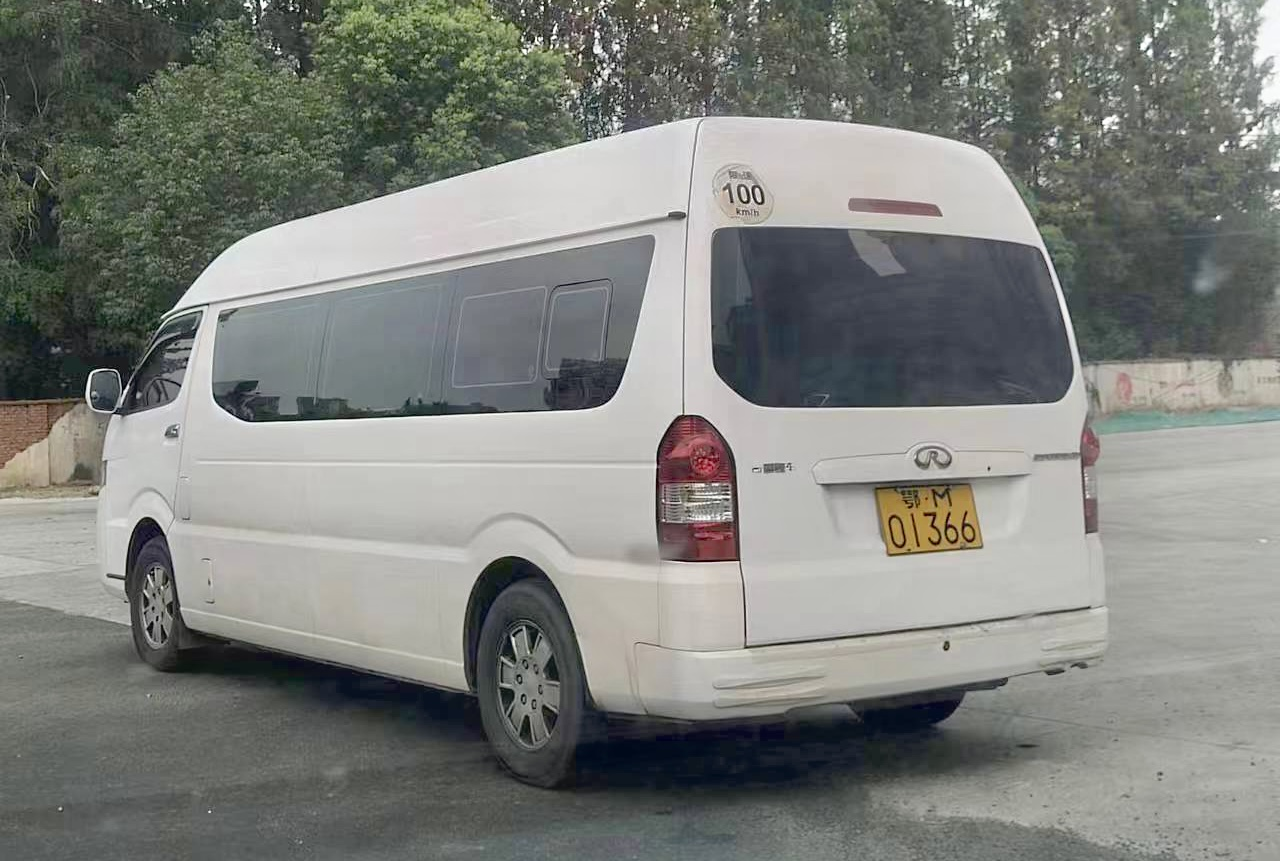
Rely H5 rear

== Controversies ==
The designs of the Rely H3 and Rely H5 are controversial as they heavily resemble the fifth generation Toyota HiAce (H200) with similar body styles and overall vehicle dimensions. The Rely H3 and Rely H5 are among the various Chinese vans from domestic brands that chose to replicate the Toyota HiAce H200 vans with only minor styling differences. Other brands include government owned manufacturers including Jinbei and Foton.
