= Timeline of Lubbock, Texas =

The following is a timeline of the history of the city of Lubbock, Texas, USA.

== 19th century ==
- 1876 - Lubbock County established; named after Thomas Saltus Lubbock.
- 1890 - Lubbock settlement formed by merger of Old Lubbock and Monterey.
- 1891
  - Lubbock designated seat of Lubbock County.
  - Leader newspaper begins publication.
  - Nicolett Hotel building moved to Lubbock from nearby North Town (approximate date).
- 1900 - Lubbock Avalanche newspaper begins publication.

== 20th century ==
- 1909
  - Railroad begins operating.
  - City of Lubbock incorporated.
  - Frank E. Wheelock becomes mayor.
- 1910 - Population: 1,938.
- 1913 - Chamber of Commerce formed.
- 1914
  - South Plains Fair begins.
  - St. Paul's-on-the-Plains Church established.
- 1917 - Lubbock Sanitarium (hospital) and Mt. Gilead Baptist Church established.
- 1920 - Population: 4,051.
- 1923 - Texas Tech University is formed
- 1924 - San Jose Catholic Church and Palace Theatre built.
- 1925
  - Texas Technological College opens.
  - The Daily Toreador student newspaper begins publication.
  - Rex Theatre in business.
- 1926 - Texas Technological College Dairy Barn built.
- 1929 - West Texas Museum established.
- 1930
  - Guadalupe School built.
  - Population: 20,520.
- 1931 - Lubbock High School built.
- 1932 - KFYO (AM) radio begins broadcasting from Lubbock.
- 1933
  - Baptist Church established.
  - Texan Theatre in business.
- 1936
  - September 7: Musician Buddy Holly born.
  - Lubbock Lake Site archaeological remains discovered.
- 1937
  - South Plains Airport begins operating.
  - Shaareth Israel Synagogue established.
- 1940
  - New Lindsey Theatre built.
  - Population: 31,853.
- 1941 - U.S. Army Flying School established near city.
- 1942 - U.S. Army South Plains Flying School established.
- 1943-1944 - Royal Air Force airmen cadets flew routinely to Lubbock on training missions from the RAF training base at Terrell, Texas.
- 1945 - Chatman Hospital opens.
- 1946
  - Lubbock Symphony Orchestra formed.
  - Plains Theatre in business.
- 1949 - U.S. military Reese Air Force Base active.
- 1950 - Population: 71,747.
- 1951
  - Regional "High Plains Water Conservation District #1" established.
  - Country Club Drive-In cinema in business.
- 1952 - KCBD-TV and KDUB-TV (television) begin broadcasting.
- 1953 - KDAV radio begins broadcasting.
- 1957 - Lubbock Christian College opens.
- 1959 - Lubbock Avalanche-Journal newspaper in publication.
- 1960 - Population: 128,691.
- 1961 - South Plains Genealogical Society founded.
- 1962 - San Jose Catholic Church rebuilt.
- 1965 - Green Fair Manor apartment building constructed.
- 1966 - City "urban renewal relocation housing project" completed.
- 1969
  - Lubbock State School opens.
  - Texas Tech University School of Medicine and Lubbock Civic Ballet established.
  - Preston Smith of Lubbock becomes Governor of Texas.
- 1970
  - May 11: 1970 Lubbock tornado.
  - Population: 149,101.
- 1977 - Lubbock Memorial Civic Center built.
- 1978 - May 19 Bombing at Faith Club Alcoholics Anonymous. Stevie Ray Vaughan played at Stubbs BBQ and AC/DC played at the Municipal Coliseum.
- 1979 - Lubbock Heritage Society formed.
- 1980 - Population: 173,979.
- 1983 - Roman Catholic Diocese of Lubbock established.
- 1990 - Population: 186,206.
- 1998 – City website online (approximate date).
- 2000 - Population: 199,564.

== 21st century ==
- 2003 - Randy Neugebauer becomes U.S. representative for Texas's 19th congressional district.
- 2008 - Tom Martin becomes mayor.
- 2010 - Population: 229,573.
- 2012 - Glen Robertson becomes mayor.
- 2016 - Dan Pope becomes mayor.
- 2020 - Population: 257,141.

== See also ==
- Lubbock, Texas history
- List of mayors of Lubbock, Texas
- National Register of Historic Places listings in Lubbock County, Texas
- Timelines of other cities in the West Texas area of Texas: Abilene, Amarillo, El Paso, Midland

== Bibliography ==
- "Lubbock". Texas State Gazetteer and Business Directory. Detroit: R.L. Polk & Co. 1890 – via Internet Archive.
- Federal Writers' Project (1940), "Lubbock", Texas: A Guide to the Lone Star State, American Guide Series, New York: Hastings House, pp. 521–522, hdl:2027/mdp.39015002677667 – via HathiTrust
- Lawrence L. Graves, ed., A History of Lubbock (Lubbock: West Texas Museum Association, 1962)
- Charles K. Edgley, W. G. Steglich and Walter J. Cartwright (1968). "Rent Subsidy and Housing Satisfaction: The Case of Urban Renewal in Lubbock, Texas". American Journal of Economics and Sociology. 27 (2): 113–124. doi:10.1111/j.1536-7150.1968.tb01032.x. JSTOR 3485264.
- Lawrence L. Graves, ed., Lubbock: From Town to City (Lubbock: West Texas Museum Association, 1986)
- Helen Simons; Cathryn A. Hoyt, eds. (1996). "Lubbock and the Plains". A Guide to Hispanic Texas (Abridged ed.). University of Texas Press. pp. 287–322. ISBN 978-0-292-77709-5.
- David J. Wishart, ed. (2004). "Cities and Towns: Lubbock, Texas". Encyclopedia of the Great Plains. University of Nebraska Press. ISBN 0-8032-4787-7.
- Donald R. Abbe; Paul Howard Carlson (2008). Historic Lubbock County: an Illustrated History. San Antonio: Historical Publishing Network. ISBN 978-1-893619-90-6.
- Russell Hill (2011). Lubbock. Arcadia. ISBN 978-0-7385-7968-9.
- Betty Dooley Awbrey; Stuart Awbrey (2013). "Lubbock". Why Stop?: A Guide to Texas Roadside Historical Markers (6th ed.). Taylor Trade Publishing. p. 287+. ISBN 978-1-58979-790-1.
- Lubbock. Images of America. Arcadia. 2013. ISBN 978-0-7385-9608-2.
