= Eastar =

Eastar may refer to:

- Eastar Jet, a South Korean airline
- Chery Eastar, a Chinese mid-size car
- Chery Eastar Cross, a Chinese compact MPV
- Eastman Eastar, a brand of polymer polycyclohexylenedimethylene terephthalate

== See also ==
- Easter (disambiguation)
- East (disambiguation)
- Star (disambiguation)
- East Star (disambiguation)
- Eastern Star (disambiguation)
- Star of the East (disambiguation)
