= Westerly =

Westerly may refer to:

- Westerlies, the prevailing winds in the middle latitudes

== Places in the United States ==
- Westerly, Rhode Island, a town
  - Westerly (CDP), Rhode Island, the urban center of the town of Westerly
  - Westerly (Amtrak station), a train station
  - Westerly State Airport, the official airport used for Westerly, Rhode Island
- Westerly, West Virginia, an unincorporated community
- Westerly (Piffard, New York), a historic home in Livingston County
- The Westerly, a high-rise building in Portland, Oregon

== Other uses ==
- Westerly (magazine), a literary magazine from the University of Western Australia

== See also ==
- Westerleigh (disambiguation)
- Wester (disambiguation)
- West (disambiguation)
