= Westar (disambiguation) =

Westar is an American satellite telecommunication system.

Westar may refer to:

- Westar Energy, an American electric utility
- Westar Institute, a non-profit institute promoting religious literacy
- Westar Rules, the name used by the West Australian Football League between 1997 and 2000
- WESTAR blasters, weapons used by Mandalorians in the Star Wars universe

== See also ==
- Wester (disambiguation)
- West (disambiguation)
- Star (disambiguation)
- Western Star (disambiguation)
- Star of the West (disambiguation)
