= Easter (disambiguation) =

Easter is a Christian and cultural annual festival.

Easter may also refer to:

== Music ==
=== Musicians ===
- Easter (band), a German electropop band

=== Albums ===
- Easter (Patti Smith Group album) or its title track (1978)
- Easter (These Arms Are Snakes album) (2006)

=== Songs ===
- "Easter" (Asian Kung-Fu Generation song) (2015)
- "Easter" (Marillion song) (1990)
- "Easter", a song by Jefferson Airplane from Long John Silver
- "Easter", a song by Love Battery from Between the Eyes

== Other uses ==
- Easter (surname)
- Easter (film), a 2002 American drama film
- Easter (play), a 1901 play by August Strindberg
- Easter (Big Love), an episode of the American TV series Big Love

== See also ==
- Easter customs, cultural traditions and practices that take place during the above festival
- "Easter, 1916", a poem by William Butler Yeats
- Eastertide, a 50-day season in some Christian traditions
- Ēostre, a goddess attested in Old English and namesake of the Easter celebration in Modern English
- Good Easter and High Easter, villages in Essex, England
- Easterly (disambiguation)
- Eastar (disambiguation)
- East (disambiguation)
