= Star of the East =

Star of the East or Star in the East may refer to:

== Arts and media ==
- Evening Star (Ipswich), a newspaper which had this title 1885–1893
- Star of the East (sculpture), an illuminated art-work in Mablethorpe, Lincolnshire, England

=== Music ===
- "Brightest and Best", also known as "Star in the East", a hymn
- "Star of the East" (song), a Christmas carol

== People ==
- Barney Aaron, English lightweight champion boxer
- Ding Junhui, snooker player
- Umm Kulthum (1904–1975), an Egyptian singer

== Religion ==
- Order of the Star in the East, a theosophical organisation
- Star of Bethlehem, referring to Matthew 2:2

== Other uses ==
- Star of the East (diamond), a 94-carat (18.8 g) diamond
- Star of the East Hotel, Adelaide, Australia
- The Star of the East, a ship appearing in an urban legend about a man called James Bartley who supposedly survived being swallowed by a whale

== See also ==
- Star of the West (disambiguation)
- East Star (disambiguation)
- Eastern Star (disambiguation)
