= Wester =

Wester can refer to:

== People ==
- Arvid Wester (1856–1914), Swedish soldier who was active in the service of the Belgians in the Congo
- August Wester (1882–1960), American wrestler
- Curtis Wester (1951–1995) Canadian Football guard
- Ivar Wester (1892–1967), Swedish sports shooter
- Jacob Wester (born 1987), Swedish freeskier
- James Kyle Wester (1857–1934), American teacher and politician
- Jennifer Wester, American ice dancer
- Johan Wester, Swedish comedian
- John Charles Wester, American prelate of the Catholic Church
- Keith A. Wester (1940–2002), American sound engineer
- LaJohntay Wester (born 2002), American college football player
- Lina Wester, Swedish ice hockey forward
- Mats Wester (born 1964), Swedish musician
- Oscar Wester (born 1995), Swedish freestyle skier
- Peter Jansen Wester (1887–1931), Swedish-American botanist
- Tess Wester, Dutch handball player
- Travis Wester (born 1977), American actor
- Ulla Wester (born 1953), Swedish politician

== Places ==
- Wester Ross, Scotland
- Wester (river) in North Rhine-Westphalia, Germany

== Other ==
- "Wester", a song from The Art of Drowning (album) by American punk rock band AFI

== See also ==
- Westerly (disambiguation)
- Westar (disambiguation)
- West (disambiguation)
