= Timeline of Midland, Texas =

The following is a timeline of the history of the city of Midland, Texas, USA.

== 19th century ==
- 1884 - Midland Post Office established.
- 1885 - Midland County created.
- 1886 - First Baptist Church founded.
- 1888 - Midland Reporter newspaper begins publication.

== 20th century ==
- 1906 - City of Midland incorporated.
- 1909 - County jail built.
- 1910
  - Midland Christian College established.
  - Population: 2,192.
- 1924 - Chamber of Commerce formed.
- 1929
  - Reporter-Telegram newspaper begins publication.
  - Yucca Theatre in business.
- 1932 - Midland County Historical Museum founded.
- 1935 - KRLH radio begins broadcasting.
- 1940 - Population: 9,352.
- 1946 - U.S. military Midland Army Air Force Base closes.
- 1952 - Midland County Historical Society established.
- 1953 - KMID-TV (television) begins broadcasting.
- 1958 - Midland County Library built.
- 1960 - Population: 62,625.
- 1961 - KDCD-TV (television) begins broadcasting.
- 1968 - U.S. Supreme Court decides redistricting-related Avery v. Midland County lawsuit.
- 1972
  - Midland College active.
  - Ernest Angelo becomes mayor.
- 1987 - "Baby Jessica" incident occurs
- 1990 - Population: 89,443.
- 1991 - American Airpower Heritage Museum relocates to Midland.
- 1999 - City website online (approximate date).

== 21st century ==
- 2010 - Population: 111,147.
- 2014 - Jerry Morales becomes mayor.
- 2019 - A spree shooting occurs in Midland and nearby Odessa, killing eight including the gunman and injuring another 25.

== See also ==
- Midland history
- List of mayors of Midland, Texas
- Timelines of other cities in the West Texas area of Texas: Abilene, Amarillo, El Paso, Lubbock

== Bibliography ==
- "Midland County". Texas Almanac. Dallas: A.H. Belo & Company. 1912.
- "Midland". Texas State Gazetteer and Business Directory. Detroit: R.L. Polk & Co. 1914.
- Dickinson Weber (1958), Comparison of Two Oil City Business Centers (Odessa-Midland, Texas, University of Chicago
- John Howard Griffin (1959). Land of the High Sky: History of Midland County of West Texas from 1849 to the Present. First National Bank of Midland. OCLC 731414735.
- Robert H. Ryan; Leonard G. Schifrin (1959), Midland: The Economic Future of a Texas Oil Center, Austin: University of Texas Bureau of Business Research, OCLC 1073160
- Roger M. Olien and Diana Davids Olien. Oil Booms: Social Change in Five Texas Towns. University of Nebraska Press, 1982. (About McCamey, Midland, Odessa, Snyder, Wink)
- Pioneer History of Midland County, Texas, 1880-1926. Dallas. 1984. OCLC 12262730.
- David J. Wishart, ed. (2004). "Cities and Towns: Midland, Texas". Encyclopedia of the Great Plains. University of Nebraska Press. ISBN 0-8032-4787-7.
- Paul T. Hellmann (2006). "Texas: Midland". Historical Gazetteer of the United States. Taylor & Francis. ISBN 1-135-94859-3.
- James Collett (2010). Midland. Images of America. Charleston, SC: Arcadia. ISBN 9781439639696.
