= Mayoral elections in Lubbock, Texas =

Elections are held in Lubbock, Texas, to elect the city's mayor. Currently, such elections are regularly scheduled to elect mayors to two-year terms.

== 2002 ==
2002 Lubbock mayoral election
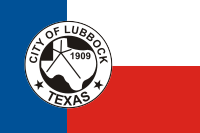
- May 4, 2002
Candidate	Marc McDougal	Ike Garnet
Party	Nonpartisan	Nonpartisan
Popular vote	11,912	1,683
Percentage	59.53%	8.41%
Mayor before election
Windy Sitton
Democratic
Elected mayor
Marc McDougal
Republican

The 2002 Lubbock mayoral election was held on May 4, 2002, to elect the mayor of Lubbock, Texas. It saw the election of Marc McDougal as the 31st mayor of Lubbock.

2002 Lubbock mayoral election
Candidate	Votes	%
D. Marc McDougal	11,912	59.53
Isaac Garnet	1,683	8.41
Larry N. Rogers	1,607	8.03
Rick Fowler	1,574	7.87
Ysabel Luna	1,257	6.28
Rick Spivey	1,195	5.97
Gilbert J. Montes II	783	3.91
Total votes	20,011	100

== 2004 ==
2004 Lubbock mayoral election
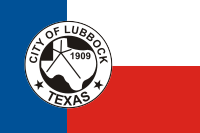
- May 15, 2004
Candidate	Marc McDougal (incumbent)	Gilbert J. Montes II
Party	Nonpartisan	Nonpartisan
Popular vote	9,815	1,760
Percentage	71.43%	12.81%
Mayor before election
Marc McDougal
Republican
Elected mayor
Marc McDougal
Republican

The 2004 Lubbock mayoral election was held on May 15, 2004, to elect the mayor of Lubbock, Texas. It saw the re-election of Marc McDougal, the 31st mayor of Lubbock.

2004 Lubbock mayoral election
Candidate	Votes	%
D. Marc McDougal	9,815	71.43
Gilbert J. Montes II	1,760	12.81
Roger Settler	1,480	10.77
Chad Dawkins	686	4.99
Total votes	13,741	100

== 2006 ==
2006 Lubbock mayoral election
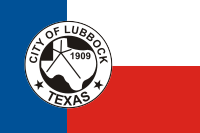
- May 13, 2006
Candidate	David Miller	Tom Martin
Party	Nonpartisan	Nonpartisan
Popular vote	10,819	8,717
Percentage	52.65%	42.42%
Mayor before election
Marc McDougal
Republican
Elected mayor
David Miller
Republican

The 2006 Lubbock mayoral election was held on May 13, 2006, to elect the mayor of Lubbock, Texas. It saw the election of David Miller as the 32nd mayor of Lubbock.

2006 Lubbock mayoral election
Candidate	Votes	%
David Miller (incumbent)	10,819	52.65
Tom Martin	8,717	42.42
Ysabel Luna	602	2.93
Gilbert J. Montes II	404	1.97
Larry Noland	5	0.02
Total votes	20,547	

== 2008 ==
2008 Lubbock mayoral election
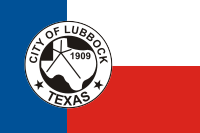
- May 10, 2008
Candidate	Tom Martin	David Miller (incumbent)
Party	Nonpartisan	Nonpartisan
Popular vote	13,405	8,472
Percentage	58.02%	36.67%
Mayor before election
David Miller
Republican
Elected mayor
Tom Martin
Republican

The 2008 Lubbock mayoral election was held on May 10, 2008, to elect the mayor of Lubbock, Texas. It saw the election of Tom Martin as the 33rd mayor of Lubbock; he defeated the one-term incumbent mayor David Miller.

2008 Lubbock mayoral election
Candidate	Votes	%
Tom Martin	13,405	58.02
David Miller (incumbent)	8,472	36.67
Gilbert J. Montes II	657	2.84
Roger Settler	569	2.46
Total votes	23,103	

== 2010 ==
2010 Lubbock mayoral election
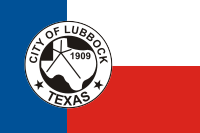
- May 8, 2010
Candidate	Tom Martin	Cody R. Smart
Party	Nonpartisan	Nonpartisan
Popular vote	7,696	2,447
Percentage	67.02%	21.31%
Mayor before election
Tom Martin
Republican
Elected mayor
Tom Martin
Republican

The 2010 Lubbock mayoral election was held on May 8, 2010, to elect the mayor of Lubbock, Texas. It saw the reelection of Tom Martin.

2010 Lubbock mayoral election
Candidate	Votes	%
Tom Martin (incumbent)	7,696	67.02
Cody R. Smart	2,447	21.31
Roger Settler	794	6.91
Richard Quade	546	4.75
Total votes	11,483	

== 2012 ==
2012 Lubbock mayoral election
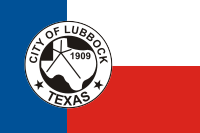
- May 12, 2012
Candidate	Glen Robertson	Tom Martin
Party	Nonpartisan	Nonpartisan
Popular vote	12,457	6,603
Percentage	65.36%	34.64%
Mayor before election
Tom Martin
Republican
Elected mayor
Glen Robertson
Republican

The 2012 Lubbock mayoral election was held on May 12, 2012, to elect the mayor of Lubbock, Texas. It saw the election of Glen Robertson, who unseated incumbent mayor Tom Martin.

2012 Lubbock mayoral election
Candidate	Votes	%
Glen Robertson	12,457	65.36
Tom Martin	6,603	34.64
Total votes	19,060	

== 2014 ==
2014 Lubbock mayoral election
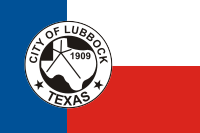
- May 10, 2014
Candidate	Glen Robertson
Party	Nonpartisan
Mayor before election
Glen Robertson
Republican
Elected mayor
Glen Robertson
Republican

The 2014 Lubbock mayoral election was held on May 10, 2014, to elect the mayor of Lubbock, Texas. Incumbent mayor Glen Robertson was reelected, running unopposed.

== 2016 ==
2016 Lubbock mayoral election
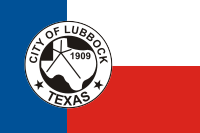
- May 7, 2016
Candidate	Dan Pope	Todd Klein	Victor Hernandez
Party	Nonpartisan	Nonpartisan	Nonpartisan
Popular vote	11,134	6,672	1,825
Percentage	52.64%	31.54%	8.63%
Candidate	Ysidro Sid Gutierrez
Party	Nonpartisan
Popular vote	1,522
Percentage	7.20%
Mayor before election
Glen Robertson
Republican
Elected mayor
Dan Pope
Republican

The 2016 Lubbock mayoral election was held on May 7, 2016, to elect the mayor of Lubbock, Texas. It saw the election of Dan Pope as Lubbock's 35th mayor.

2016 Lubbock mayoral election
Candidate	Votes	%
Dan Pope	11,134	52.64
Todd Klein	6,672	31.54
Victor Hernandez	1,825	8.63
Ysidro Sid Gutierrez	1,522	7.20
Total votes	21,153	

== 2018 ==
2018 Lubbock mayoral election
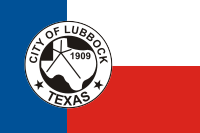
- May 5, 2018
Candidate	Dan Pope	Jonathan Cothran
Party	Nonpartisan	Nonpartisan
Popular vote	11,394	2,686
Percentage	78.02%	18.39%
Mayor before election
Dan Pope
Republican
Elected mayor
Dan Pope
Republican

The 2018 Lubbock mayoral election was held on May 5, 2018, to elect the mayor of Lubbock, Texas. It saw the re-election of Dan Pope.

2018 Lubbock mayoral election
Candidate	Votes	%
Dan Pope (incumbent)	11,394	78.02
Johnathan Cothran	2,686	18.39
Stephen Sanders (write-in)	524	3.59
Total votes	14,604	

== 2020 ==
2020 Lubbock mayoral election
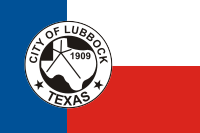
- November 3, 2020
Candidate	Dan Pope	Stephen Sanders
Party	Nonpartisan	Nonpartisan
Popular vote	48,818	38,818
Percentage	55.71%	44.29%
- Results by precinct Pope: 50–60% 60–70% Sanders: 50–60% 60–70% 70–80%
Mayor before election
Dan Pope
Republican
Elected mayor
Dan Pope
Republican

The 2020 Lubbock mayoral election took place on November 3, 2020. The election saw Dan Pope reelected to serve a third consecutive term as mayor.

The election was originally scheduled to take place on May 2, 2020, but was postponed to November 3 after a proclamation from Texas governor Greg Abbott to allow political subdivisions to delay voting. The delay was due to concerns related to the COVID-19 pandemic.

2020 Lubbock mayoral election
Candidate	Votes	%
Dan Pope (incumbent)	48,818	55.71
Stephen Sanders	38,818	44.29
Total votes	87,636	

== 2022 ==
2022 Lubbock mayoral election
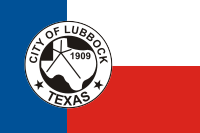
- May 7, 2022
Candidate	Tray Payne	Adam Hernandez	Stephen Sanders
Party	Nonpartisan	Nonpartisan	Nonpartisan
Popular vote	12,961	3,565	1,682
Percentage	67.7	18.6	8.8
Candidate	Gulrez Khan	Epifanio Garza
Party	Nonpartisan	Nonpartisan
Popular vote	603	341
Percentage	3.1	1.8
Mayor before election
Dan Pope
Republican
Elected mayor
Tray Payne
Republican

The 2022 Lubbock mayoral election took place on May 7, 2022. The incumbent mayor, Dan Pope, did not stand for reelection. Tray Payne was voted to serve as Lubbock's 36th mayor.

2022 Lubbock mayoral election
Candidate	Votes	%
Tray Payne	12,961	67.7
Adam Hernandez	3,565	18.6
Stephen Sanders	1,682	8.8
Gulrez Khan	603	3.1
Epifanio Garza	341	1.8
Total votes	19,152	

== 2024 ==
2024 Lubbock mayoral election
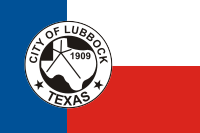
- May 4, 2024 (first round); June 15, 2024 (runoff)
Candidate	Mark McBrayer	Steve Massengale	Adam Hernandez
First round	11,537; 37.4	8,720; 28.2	6,307; 20.4
Runoff	11,864; 72.2	4,577; 23.8	Eliminated
Candidate	Stephen Sanders	Epifanio Garza
First round	2,193; 7.1	1,809; 5.9
Runoff	Eliminated	Eliminated
Mayor before election
Tray Payne
Republican
Elected mayor
Mark McBrayer
Republican

The 2024 Lubbock mayoral election took place on May 4, 2024, with a runoff on June 15. The incumbent mayor, Trey Payne, did not stand for reelection.

2024 Lubbock mayoral election
Candidate	Votes	%
Mark McBrayer	11,537	37.4
Steve Massengale	8,720	28.2
Adam Hernandez	6,307	20.4
Stephen Sanders	2,193	7.1
Antonio Renteria	1,809	5.9
Kolton Bacon	312	1.0
Total votes	30,878	100.0

2024 Lubbock mayoral election runoff
Candidate	Votes	%
Mark McBrayer	11,864	72.2
Steve Massengale	4,577	23.8
Total votes	16,441	100.0

== 2026 ==
2026 Lubbock mayoral election
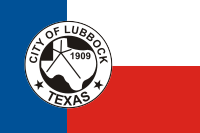
- May 2, 2026
Candidate	Mark McBrayer	Stephen Sanders	Peggy Bohmfalk
Popular vote	6,779	1,853	751
Percentage	70.34%	19.23%	7.79%
Mayor before election
Mark McBrayer
Republican
Elected mayor
Mark McBrayer
Republican

The 2026 Lubbock mayoral election was held on May 2, 2026. The incumbent mayor, Mark McBrayer, has been re-elected.

2026 Lubbock mayoral election
Candidate	Votes	%
Mark McBrayer (incumbent)	6,779	70.34
Stephen Sanders	1,853	19.23
Peggy Bohmfalk	751	7.79
G. Todd Winans	255	2.65
Total votes	9,638	100.00
