= Easterly =

Easterly may refer to:

== Geography ==
- Easterlies, the trade winds which blow primarily east-to-west in tropical regions

== People ==
- Catharine F. Easterly (born 1970), American judge in Washington, D.C.
- Chris Easterly, American screenwriter
- Dick Easterly (born 1939), American football player
- Harry Easterly (1922–2005), American golf administrator
- Jamie Easterly (born 1953), American baseball player
- Jen Easterly (born 1968), American intelligence officer
- Ted Easterly (1885–1951), American baseball player
- Thomas Martin Easterly (1809–1882), American photographer
- William Easterly (born 1957), American economist

== Places ==
- Easterly, Texas, an unincorporated community in Robertson County, Texas

== See also ==
- Easterly wave, a type of atmospheric trough
- Easter (disambiguation)
- East (disambiguation)
