= Timeline of Amarillo, Texas =

The following is a timeline of the history of the city of Amarillo, Texas, USA.

== 19th century ==
- 1889 – Town of Amarillo incorporated.
- 1890 – Population: 483.
- 1892 – W. W. Wetsel becomes mayor.
- 1899 – City of Amarillo incorporated.
- 1900 – Population: 1,442.

== 20th century ==
- 1905 – Amarillo Livestock Auction begins. It will go on to become the world's largest seller of cattle by open bidding.
- 1907 – Grand Opera House built.
- 1909
  - Amarillo News begins publication.
  - Amarillo National Bank established.
- 1910 – Population: 9,957.
- 1914 – Amarillo Police Department formed.
- 1915 – Panhandle Weekly newspaper begins publication.
- 1918 – "Natural gas discovered."
- 1921 – "Oil discovered."
- 1924
  - Amarillo Globe newspaper begins publication.
  - Tri-State Fairgrounds open.
- 1926
  - Roman Catholic Diocese of Amarillo established.
  - Amarillo Globe-News newspaper in publication.
  - Herring Hotel built.
- 1929
  - Amarillo College established.
  - English Field (airfield) begins operating.
  - Temple B'nai Israel dedicated.
- 1930
  - Santa Fe Building (hi-rise) constructed.
  - Population: 43,132.
- 1932
  - Potter County Courthouse built.
  - Paramount Theatre in business.
- 1935
  - KGNC radio begins broadcasting.
- 1939
  - Amarillo US Post Office and Courthouse built.
  - KFDA radio begins broadcasting.
- 1942 – U.S. military Amarillo Army Air Field activated near city.
- 1949 – Sunset Drive-In cinema in business.
- 1953 – KFDA-TV and KGNC-TV (now KAMR-TV) (television) begin broadcasting.
- 1954 – Texas State Highway Loop 279 in operation.
- 1957 – KVII-TV (television) begins broadcasting.
- 1960 – Population: 137,969.
- 1966 – Amarillo City Transit established.
- 1968
  - U.S. military Amarillo Air Force Base closes.
  - Amarillo Civic Center (convention center) opens (approximate date).
  - Fox Theatre (cinema) in business.
- 1971 – Chase Tower built.
- 1972 – Amarillo Art Center established.
- 1976 – Amarillo International Airport in operation.
- 1982
  - High Plains Food Bank organized.
  - KJTV (now KCIT) (television) begin broadcasting.
- 1990 – Population: 157,571.
- 1998 – February 10: Oprah Winfrey wins mad cow disease-related lawsuit brought by local ranchers.
- 2000 – Amarillo National Center (arena) built.

== 21st century ==
- 2006 – Globe-News Center for the Performing Arts opens.
- 2010 – Population: 190,695.
- 2011 – Paul Harpole becomes mayor.
- 2017 – Xcel Energy opens a new building in downtown Amarillo, with a new downtown hotel that was built along with a parking garage. Ginger Nelson was elected the 2nd female mayor in Amarillo.

== See also ==
- Amarillo history
- List of mayors of Amarillo, Texas
- National Register of Historic Places listings in Potter County, Texas
- Timelines of other cities in the West Texas area of Texas: Abilene, El Paso, Lubbock, Midland

== Bibliography ==
- "Amarillo". Texas State Gazetteer and Business Directory. Detroit: R.L. Polk & Co. 1890.
- Charter of the City of Amarillo. Amarillo, Tex. [Russell & Cockrell]. 1914.
- "Amarillo". Texas State Gazetteer and Business Directory. Detroit: R.L. Polk & Co. 1914.
- Federal Writers' Project (1940), "Amarillo", Texas: A Guide to the Lone Star State, American Guide Series, New York: Hastings House, hdl:2027/mdp.39015002677667 – via HathiTrust + chronology
- Della Tyler Key. In the Cattle Country: History of Potter County, 1887–1966 (Amarillo: Tyler-Berkley, 1961; 2d ed., Wichita Falls: Nortex, 1972).
- David L. Nail. One Short Sleep Past: A Profile of Amarillo in the Thirties (Canyon, Texas: Staked Plains, 1973).
- Ory Mazar Nergal, ed. (1980), "Amarillo, TX", Encyclopedia of American Cities, New York: E.P. Dutton, OL 4120668M
- Helen Simons; Cathryn A. Hoyt, eds. (1996). "Lubbock and the Plains: Amarillo". Guide to Hispanic Texas (Abridged ed.). University of Texas Press. pp. 295+. ISBN 978-0-292-77709-5.
- David J. Wishart, ed. (2004). "Cities and Towns: Amarillo, Texas". Encyclopedia of the Great Plains. University of Nebraska Press. ISBN 0-8032-4787-7.
- Paul H. Carlson (2006). Amarillo: the Story of a Western Town. Lubbock: Texas Tech University Press. ISBN 978-0-89672-587-4.
- Paul T. Hellmann (2006). "Texas: Amarillo". Historical Gazetteer of the United States. Taylor & Francis. ISBN 1-135-94859-3.
- Ron Smith (2009). Amarillo. Postcard History Series. Arcadia. ISBN 978-0-7385-7123-2.
- David G. McComb (2015). "Railroad Towns: Amarillo". The City in Texas: a History. University of Texas Press. pp. 134+. ISBN 978-0-292-76746-1.
