= East Star (disambiguation) =

East Star Airlines was an airline based in Wuhan, Hubei, People's Republic of China.

East Star may also refer to:

- A single co-produced by Missrepresent
- SS East Star, Canada

== See also ==
- Middle East Star of Midwest Radio Network
- Eastar (disambiguation)
- Eastern Star (disambiguation)
