= Hillside, Portland, Oregon =

Hillside
- Neighborhood
- Interactive map of Hillside
- Coordinates: 45°31′42″N 122°42′49″W
- Country: United States
- State: Oregon
- City: Portland

Government
  - Association: Hillside Neighborhood Association
  - Coalition: District Four Coalition

Area
  - Total: 0.47 sq mi (1.21 km^{2})

Population (2000)
  - Total: 1,285
  - Density: 2,750/sq mi (1,060/km^{2})

Housing
  - No. of households: 573
  - Occupancy rate: 95% occupied
  - Owner-occupied: 547 households (95%)
  - Renting: 26 households (5%)
  - Avg. household size: 2.24 persons

Hillside is a Northwest Portland neighborhood in the city's West Hills. It is anchored by the Hillside Community Center, the former site of Catlin Gabel School, which was designed by noted architect Pietro Belluschi. The center features neighborhood meeting spaces, a soccer field and a basketball court. The neighborhood is adjacent to Northwest, which is home to many restaurants, bars and shops and to Forest Park.

== Parks ==
- Adams Community Garden - 4300 NW Cornell Rd.
- Adams Property - 4300 NW Cornell Rd.
- Hillside Community Center - 635 NW Culpepper Terr.
- Hillside Park - 653 NW Culpepper Terr.
- Pittock Mansion - 3229 NW Pittock Dr.

== Buildings ==
- The Westerly - 2351 NW Westover Rd.
