= List of mayors of Lubbock, Texas =

Number of mayors of Lubbock by party affiliation^{[A]}
Party	Mayors
Democratic	25
Republican	13
Independent	0

The following is a list of mayors of Lubbock, Texas.

#	Mayor	Term start	Term end	Political party
1	Frank E. Wheelock	1909	1915	Democratic
2	W.F. Schenck	1915	1917	Republican
3	J.K Wester	October 8, 1917	1918	Democratic
4	C.E. Parks	1918	1922	Democratic
5	Percy Spencer	1922	1924	Democratic
6	F.R. Friend	1924	1926	Democratic
7	Pink L. Parrish	1926	1928	Democratic
8	H.D. Woods	1928	1930	Democratic
9	J.J. Clements	1930	1934	Democratic
10	Ross Edwards	1934	1938	Democratic
11	C.E. Slaton	1938	1944	Democratic
12	O.W. Ribble	1944	1946	Democratic
13	C.A. Bestwick	1946	1948	Democratic
14	W.H. Rodgers	1948	1950	Democratic
15	C.K. Whiteside	1950	1952	Democratic
16	Murrell R. Tripp	1952	1956	Democratic
17	S.S. Forrest, Jr.	1956	1958	Republican
18	Lennis W. Baker	1958	1960	Republican
19	David C. Casey	1960	1962	Democratic
20	Jack F. Strong	1962	1964	Democratic
21	Max Tidmore	1964	1966	Democratic
22	W.D. "Dub" Rogers, Jr.	1966	1970	Democratic
23	James Harlan Granberry, Sr.	1970	1972	Republican
24	Morris Wayne Turner	1972	1974	Democratic
25	Roy Byrn Bass, Sr.	1974	1978	Democratic
26	Dirk West	1978	1980	Democratic
27	Bill McAlister	1980	June 1983	Democratic
28	Alan Henry	August 1983	1986	Democratic
29	B.C. "Peck" McMinn	1986	1992	Republican
30	David R. Langston	1992	September 1996	Republican
30	Windy Sitton	November 1996	2002	Democratic
31	Marc McDougal	2002	May 2006	Republican
32	David A. Miller	May 2006	May 2008	Republican
33	Thomas Allen Martin	May 2008	May 2012	Republican
34	Glen Charles Robertson	May 2012	May 2016	Republican
35	Daniel Manning Pope	May 2016	May 2022	Republican
36	Tray Payne	May 2022	May 2024	Republican
37	Mark McBrayer	May 2024	Present	Republican

== See also ==
- Mayoral elections in Lubbock
- Timeline of Lubbock, Texas
