= Chery Arrizo M7 =

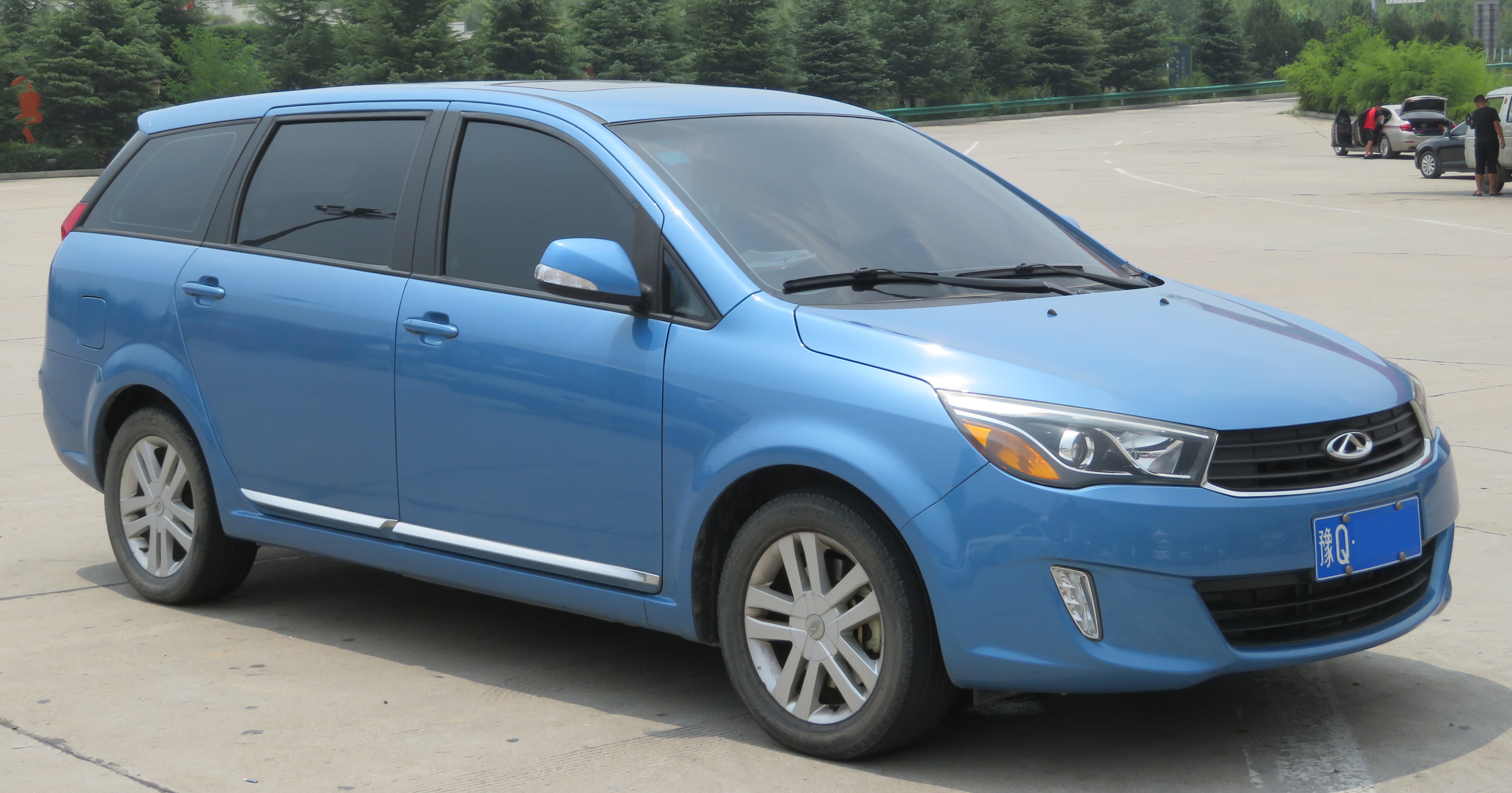

Overview
- Manufacturer: Chery
- Also called: Chery Maxime (Malaysia)
- Production: 2015–2018
- Assembly: Wuhu, China; Johor Bahru, Malaysia

Body and chassis
- Class: Compact MPV
- Body style: 5-door minivan
- Layout: Front-engine, front-wheel-drive
- Related: Chery Eastar Cross

Powertrain
- Engine: 1.8 L SQR481FC I4; 2.0 L SQR484F I4
- Transmission: 5 speed manual CVT

Dimensions
- Wheelbase: 2,800 mm (110.2 in)
- Length: 4,730 mm (186.2 in)
- Width: 1,823 mm (71.8 in)

Chronology
- Predecessor: Chery Eastar Cross
- Successor: Chery Tiggo 8 Chery Tiggo 9

The Chery Arrizo M7 (Chinese: 艾瑞泽M7) is a compact MPV produced by the Chinese manufacturer Chery Automobile.

== History ==
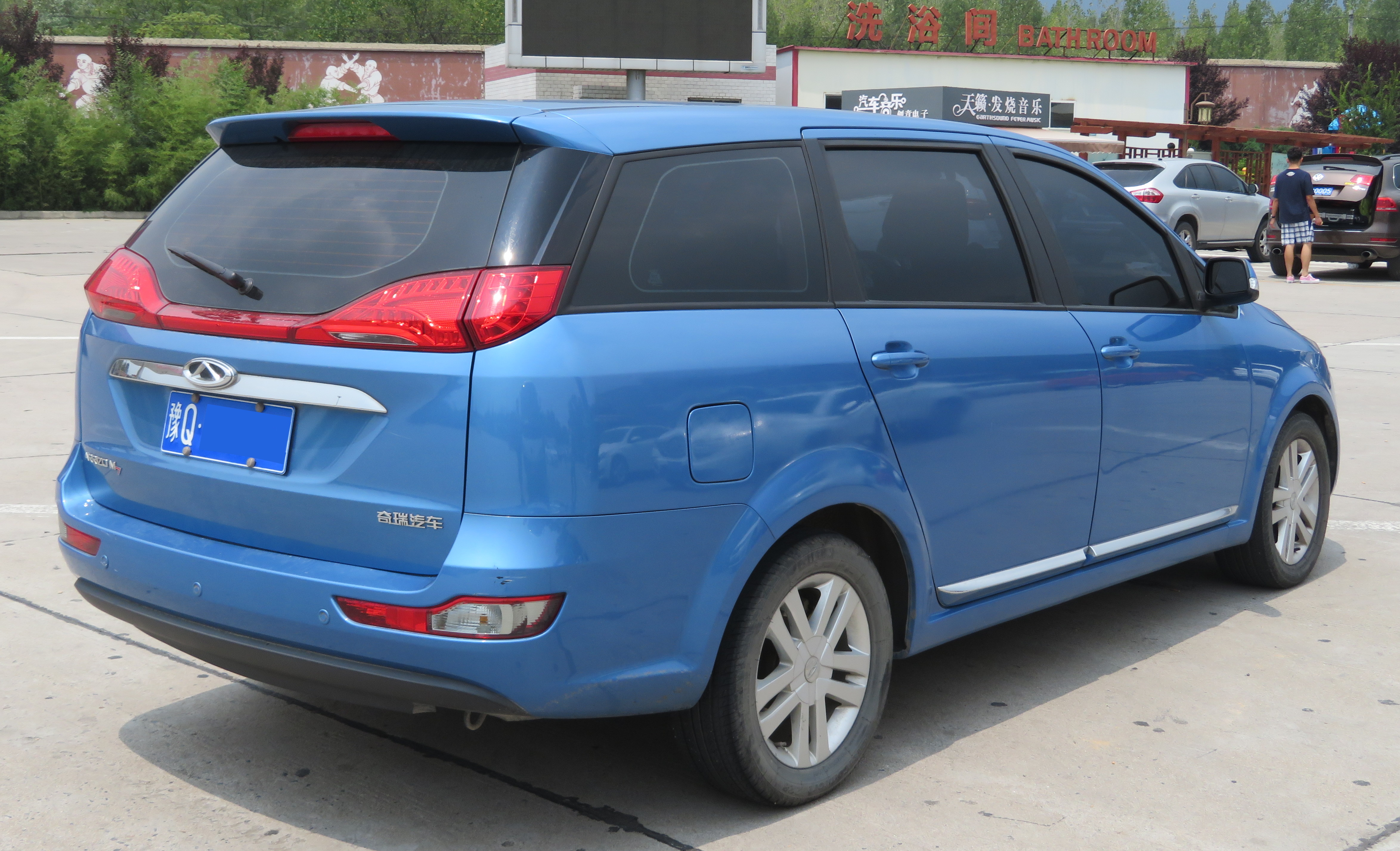
Rear

The Chery Arrizo M7 is essentially a facelift of the previously sold Chery Eastar Cross with the majority of body panels carried over with only the front and rear bumpers, front fenders and hood, rear glass, and front and rear light units redesigned.

In December 2013, Spy Shots suggested that the car would be called Chery V5.

In August 2014, Spy Shots suggested that the car would be called Chery Fulwin 8.

The Chery Arrizo M7 made its world debut in Malaysia as the Chery Maxime where it was launched in January 2015 with two variants: Standard and Premium. In April 2015, during the Auto Shanghai 2015, the Chery Arrizo M7 was launched in China. It was discontinued in 2018 and the vehicle lineup was succeeded by the Chery Tiggo 8.
