= Lennis W. Baker =

American politician (1912–2000)

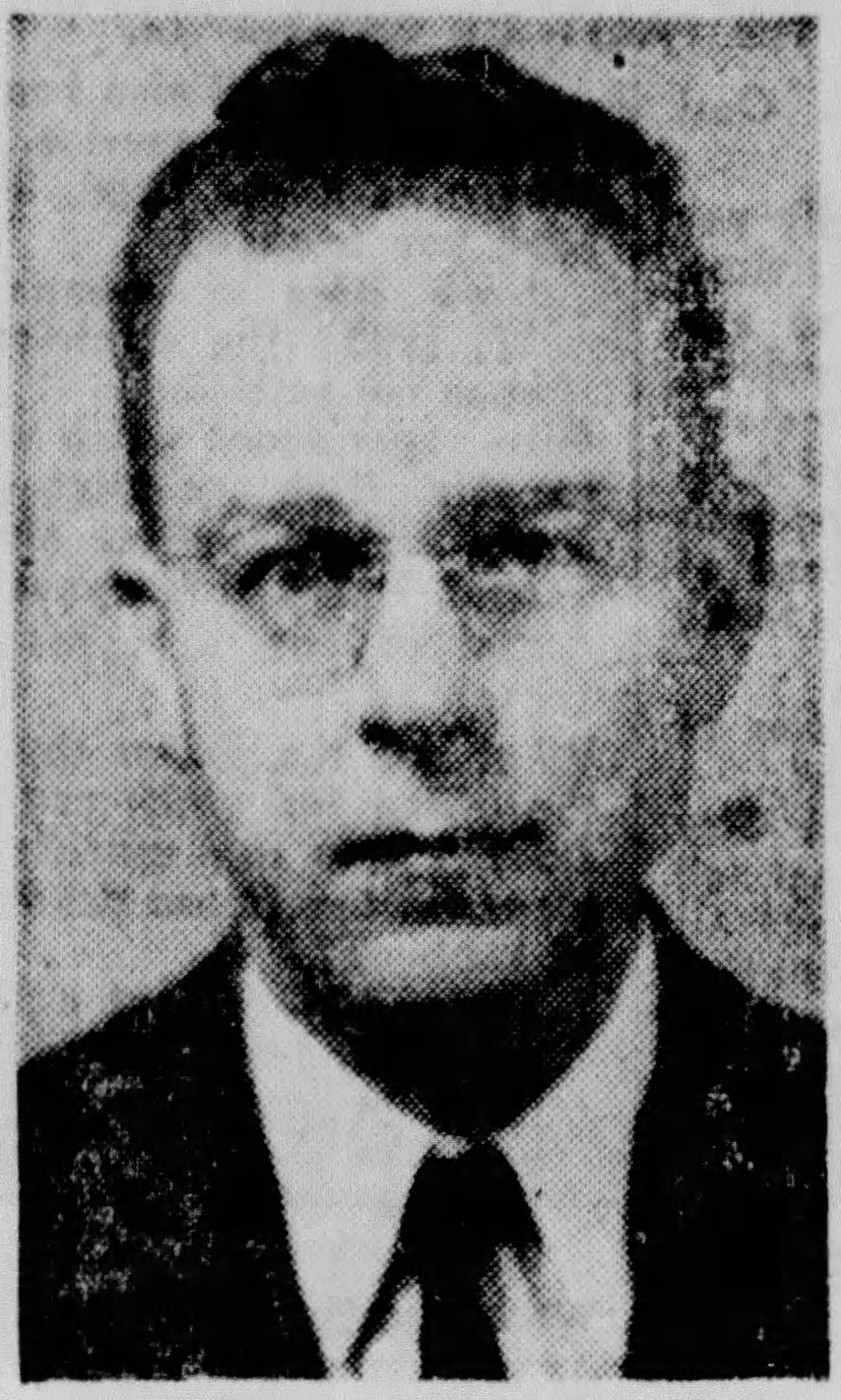

18th Mayor of Lubbock, Texas
- In office April 1, 1958 – 1960
- Preceded by: S. S. Forrest
- Succeeded by: David C. Casey

Personal details
- Born: March 12, 1912 Lockney, Texas, U.S.
- Died: August 23, 2000 (aged 88) Lubbock, Texas, U.S.
- Party: Republican
- Spouse: Verdie Mae Warren (m. 1940)
- Children: 3
- Education: Texas Tech

Lennis Watson Baker (March 12, 1912 – August 23, 2000) was an American politician who served as mayor of Lubbock, Texas from 1958 to 1960.

== Early life ==
Baker was born on March 12, 1912, in Lockney, Texas, to France Baker and Lea Maud Watson. He moved to Lubbock in 1919. He graduated from Lubbock High School, and attended Texas Tech for three years, studying Business Administration. In 1931, he began his business career working in the printing, office supply, and sporting goods industry. He began serving on the Lubbock Christian University Board of Trustees in 1959. He served as chairman of the board from 1964 to 1978.

== Political career ==
He began his political career serving four years on the Lubbock City Commission. He was elected mayor on April 1, 1958, defeating Casey Charness, 2,622 to 815 votes. He did not seek reelection in 1960. During his tenure, a proposal was made for the construction of a new city hall, and expansion of airport facilities.

== Personal life ==
He married his wife, Verdie Mae Warren, on September 15, 1940. They have three daughters. He died on August 23, 2000, aged 88, in Lubbock.
