= Midland County Library =

Library system in Midland, Texas

Midland County Public Libraries
- Location: 301 W Missouri Avenue; Midland, TX 79701
- Established: 1903
- Branches: 4

Other information
- Director: Debbie Colson
- Website: https://www.co.midland.tx.us/150/Public-Libraries

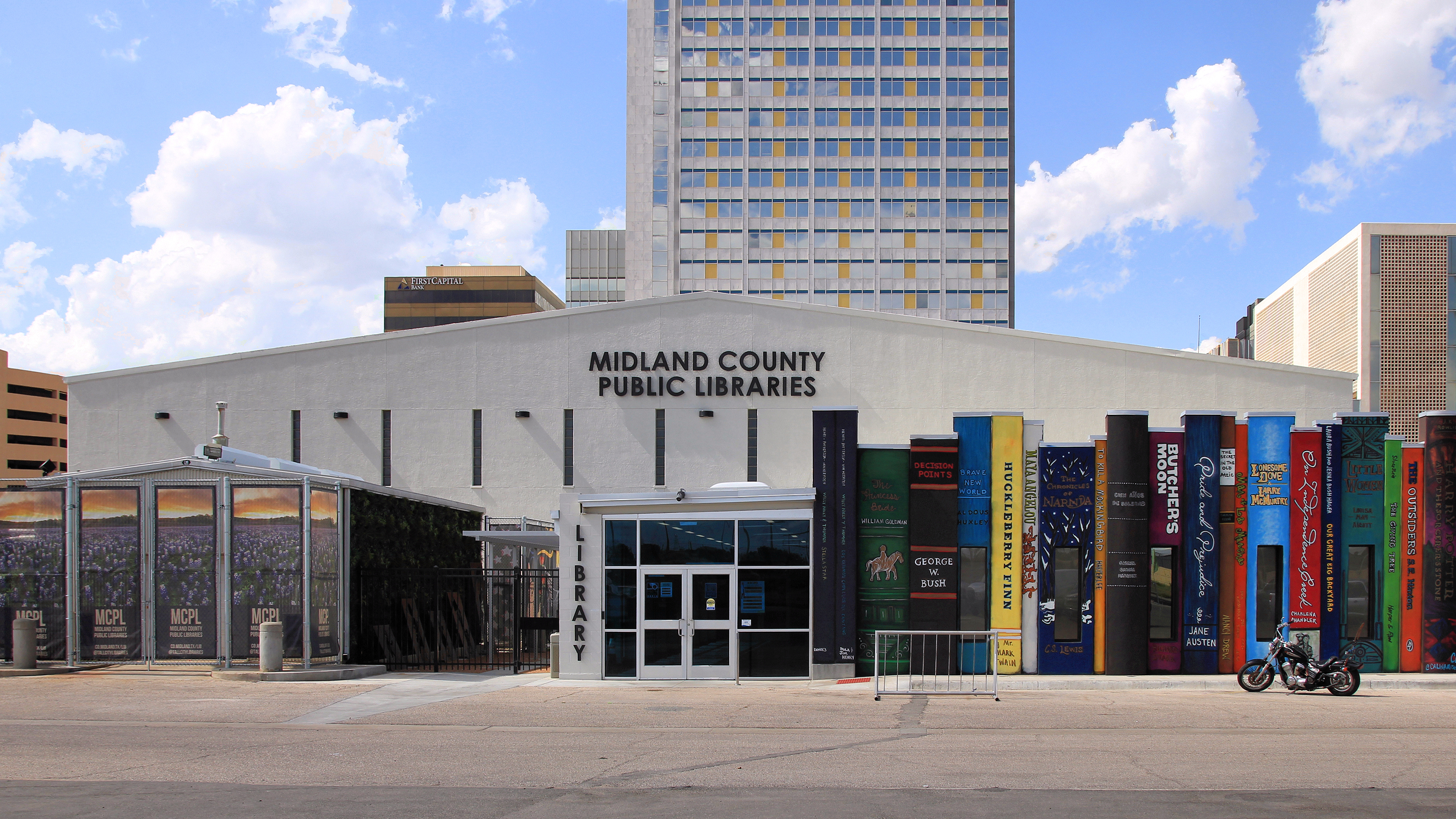
The Midland County Public Library at the Plaza in downtown Midland, Texas.

The Midland County Public Library system provides library services to Midland County, Texas, as well as the surrounding counties of Andrews, Crane, Ector, Glasscock, Howard, Martin, Reagan, and Upton. It is currently a 4 branch system consisting of the Downtown Library, the Centennial Library, the Law Library, and a Bookmobile.

== History ==
In early 1903, several local women's organizations formed the Midland Library Association. The library was built on the corner of West Wall and Colorado Streets on two lots costing $125. The library building itself cost $1550. It was decided that each member of the Association would serve as librarian for one week each in alphabetical order.

In 1929 the library was owned by the county and was located in the corner of the county courthouse. The library became a project of the Altrusa Club which organized the Friends of the Library, and in 1956 they circulated a petition for a bond election to build a new library building. This was approved and construction at 301 West Missouri Street began in 1957. The 28,000 square foot building was finished in 1958 at a cost of $400,000.

By 1971, the library owned a total of 100,000 books which qualified it as a library of the First Class in the American Library Association. The Midland Centennial Branch Library opened at the Midland Park Mall in 1985. It was moved to the Imperial Shopping Center in 2004. By 1990, the library collection had outgrown the building, and the Friends of the Library again circulated a petition asking the county commissioners for an expansion to the Downtown facility. A 20,000 square foot addition was completed in 1993 at a cost of about $2.5 million.

Construction began in 2012 on a new Centennial Library building. On April 11, 2013, the Centennial Library reopened as a 33,000-square-foot, one story location with updated technology, including digital touchscreens, an interactive card catalog, virtualized computers, and free Wi-Fi. In 2014, the library system went fine-free. In 2018 the Downtown Library was renovated and reopened in 2019.

In 2023, the Midland County commissioners voted to end their partnership with the American Library Association, but Midland County Public Library remains part of the Texas Library Association.

== Awards and recognition ==
In 2014, the Midland Centennial Library won the American Library Association and the International Interior Design Association (ALA/IIDA) Library Interior Design Award for Public Libraries over 30,000 sq. ft. Also in 2014, John Trischitti III, the Director of the Midland Public Library, won Librarian of the Year from the Texas Library Association. In 2015, the library was named Organization of the Year by Midland Reporter-Telegrams. In 2018, Midland County Public Library received the NMC Beacon Award for Excellence in Collaboration with Keep Midland Beautiful.

== Services ==
Midland County Public Library provides many services in addition to library materials, including exhibits, special collections, test proctoring, room reservations, a notary, and a passport facility. There are also Youth Services, Adult Services, and Ask a Librarian services available. The Downtown Library holds the Petroleum Collection, which began in 1935 and features materials related to petroleum organizations and societies. The Centennial Library holds the Genealogy collection, which began in 1968. In 2023, the Centennial Library opened the Business Resource & Information Center (BRIC) to assist patrons seeking help with careers and employment.
