= James Kyle Wester =

American teacher and politician (1857–1934)

3rd Mayor of Lubbock, Texas
- In office October 8, 1917 – 1919
- Preceded by: Walter Francis Schenck
- Succeeded by: Charles Edward Parks

Member of the Texas House of Representatives from the 105th district
- In office January 10, 1893 – January 12, 1897

Member of the Texas House of Representatives from the 119th district
- In office January 13, 1925 – January 11, 1827

Personal details
- Born: November 28, 1857; Rutledge, Tennessee, U.S.
- Died: July 31, 1934 (aged 76); Lubbock, Texas, U.S.
- Political party: Democratic

James Kyle Wester (November 28, 1857 – July 31, 1934) was an American teacher and politician. He was the third mayor of Lubbock, Texas. He also served three terms in the Texas House of Representatives.

== Life ==
James Kyle Wester was born on November 28, 1857 in Rutledge, Tennessee, the son of John Henry Wester and Nancy Almeda McAnally. He attended Madison Academy and Tazewell College in Tennessee before working as a mathematics teacher. In 1878 he moved to Grayson County, Texas, and worked on Tom Waggoner in Knox County.

He served as the mayor of Lubbock from October 1917 to 1919.

Schenck died on July 31, 1934 and was buried at the City of Lubbock Cemetery.
