= Dan Pope =

American politician (born 1963)

35th Mayor of Lubbock, Texas
- In office May 17, 2016 – May 17, 2022
- Preceded by: Glen Robertson
- Succeeded by: Tray Payne

Personal details
- Born: Daniel Manning Pope; March 19, 1963 (age 63) Temple, Texas, U.S.
- Party: Republican
- Education: Texas Tech University
- Occupation: Businessman
- Website: mayordanpope.com

Daniel Manning Pope (born March 19, 1963) is an American businessman and politician. He served as the 35th Mayor of Lubbock, Texas, and has completed his third term as Mayor.

== Early life ==
Pope was born in Temple, Texas to Bert and Marcia Pope and graduated from Temple High School. He is an Eagle Scout in the Boy Scouts of America. Pope attended Texas Tech University where he was a member of Phi Delta Theta fraternity. He graduated with a Bachelor of Business Administration degree in Finance from the Rawls College of Business in 1985.

== Political career ==
On November 12, 2015, Pope announced his candidacy for the 2016 City of Lubbock mayoral election. On May 7, 2016, Pope won the general election to replace outgoing mayor Glen Robertson, a current Republican candidate for Texas's 19th congressional district seat. Pope won 53 percent of the vote in the four-person non-partisan race. He avoided a runoff election with the second-place candidate, who finished with 32 percent of the ballots cast.

On May 5, 2018, Pope won a second two-year term as mayor with 78 percent of the vote over two little-known challengers. In the campaign, Pope stressed public safety, including a new police facility, and planning for Lubbock's future growth. The 2020 Mayoral election, in which Pope is standing, was scheduled to take place on May 2, however was postponed to November 3 after a proclamation from Texas Governor Greg Abbott to allow political subdivisions to delay voting. Lubbock native Stephen Sanders is challenging Pope. Sanders had run against Pope before as a write in candidate during the 2018 mayoral election.

Pope and his wife, Denise, have two children, Manning and Anne Claire. Pope is a former member of the Lubbock Independent School District Board of Trustees, and Rawls College of Business Advisory Council.

== Controversies as Mayor ==
In September 2020 Pope issued a public apology for not recusing himself from a vote that helped direct taxpayer money toward a business investment made by his wife.

== Electoral history ==
2016 Lubbock mayoral election
Party	Candidate	Votes	%
Nonpartisan	Dan Pope	11,134	52.64
Nonpartisan	Todd Klein	6,672	31.54
Nonpartisan	Victor Hernandez	1,825	8.63
Nonpartisan	Ysidro Gutierrez	1,522	7.20

2018 Lubbock mayoral election
Party	Candidate	Votes	%
Nonpartisan	Dan Pope	11,394	78.02
Nonpartisan	Johnathan Cothran	2,686	18.39
Write-In	Stephen Sanders	524	3.59

2020 Lubbock mayoral election
Party	Candidate	Votes	%
Nonpartisan	Dan Pope	48,818	55.71
Nonpartisan	Stephen Sanders	38,818	44.29
