= Westerleigh (disambiguation) =

Westerleigh may refer to:

- Westerleigh, a village in South Gloucestershire, England
- Westerleigh, Staten Island, a neighborhood in Staten Island, New York, USA.
- Westerleigh Junction, a railway junction in Gloucestershire, England
