= Missrepresent =

British drum and bass DJ

Aliina Atkinson, known by her stage name DJ Missrepresent, sometimes Miss Represent is a British drum and bass DJ and music producer.

== Career ==
Missrepresent, previously Aliina Mayes, established Aftershock Radio in 2004, an internet based radio station which broadcast from Gloucester. Aftershock went on to co-host events alongside drum and bass promoters Bedlam, Devotion and Random Concept which toured around the UK, Spain and Germany.

She was part of the duo Silent Code, providing vocals and co-producing for the singles "Night Train", "Spellbound", and "East Star" released on the EA Games Need For Speed soundtrack.

Remixes of DJ SS Black feature on Formation Records run by DJ SS, and the jungle remix of DJ Rap's Spiritual Aura was released on Propa Talent Recordings. Viper Recordings released Engaged, and Listen. Easy Records released the Code Breaker EP.

Missrepresent appeared as part of the Ortofon / Ecler Pro DJ team at promotional events for Henley Pro 2009/2010, and has endorsed other products such as the Pump Audio earphones.

Missrepresent has a DJ career and appears at music events and festivals as stated in The Scunthorpe Telegraph DJ Mag, Scunthorpe Nights, KMag and DOA. Her performances in Seoul Korea and Taipei 2009 events, had Tom Leeming of the Taipei Times promoting it as "a must-see event".

Missrepresent was named alongside Annie Mac and DJ Storm at the National Drum and Bass Awards in 2012.

Flavourmag named her as one of the 15 top hottest DJs in the UK in 2013.

In August 2015 she won the best female jungle DJ award at the We Love Jungle Awards London.

In August 2016 she won the best female artist award at the National drum and bass awards held at the London O2.

== Discography (singles) ==
- Missrepresent feat. Bellyman - "Another Dimension"
- DJ Rap - Spiritual Aura (Silent Code Remix) Propa Talent
- Engaged - Silent Code - Viper Recordings
- "Dutty Gal" (VIP Mix) Featuring The Ragga Twins
- DJ SS Black VIP - "Silent Code Remix" - Formation Records
- Listen - "Silent Code" - Viper Recordings
- Bigger News Feat Kat Blue - "Formation Records Back To Jungle"
- "Twisted World" - Joe Nebula & Rachael Wallace (Silent Code Remix)
- "Spellbound" - Easy Records
