= Western Star =

Western Star or The Western Star may refer to:

== Newspapers ==
- The Western Star (Bessemer, Alabama), a weekly newspaper published in Bessemer, Alabama
- Western Star (Kerala), a defunct English newspaper in Kerala, India
- The Western Star (Corner Brook), a newspaper in Corner Brook, Newfoundland
- The Western Star (Ohio), a defunct weekly newspaper in Lebanon, Ohio
- The Western Star (Queensland), formerly The Western Star and Roma Advertiser

== Transportation ==
- Western Star Trucks, a Canadian manufacturer of commercial trucks
- Western Star (train), a passenger train operated by the Great Northern Railway
- USS Western Star (ID-4210), a United States Navy cargo ship in commission from 1918 to 1919

== Literature ==
- Western Star, an unfinished narrative poem by Stephen Vincent Benét
- The Adventure of the Western Star, an adventure in the Poirot Investigates collection of short stories

== Other uses ==
- Western Star, Ohio, a community in the United States
- Western Star (butter), an Australian brand of butter produced by Fonterra

== See also ==
- Star of the West (disambiguation)
