= Star of the West (disambiguation) =

Star of the West was an American merchant steamship built in 1852, which in January 1861 became the target of what some historians consider to have been effectively the first shots fired in the American Civil War.

Star of the West may also refer to:

- Star of the West (Baháʼí magazine): The first (1910–1935) national news periodical for the Baháʼí Faith of the United States and Canada
- Robert Hawker, Anglican priest called "Star of the West" for his preaching

Star in the West may refer to:

- "Star in the West", an occult essay by J. F. C. Fuller
- Star in the West, a newspaper published by John A. Gurley
- Star in the West, a novel that provides the plot for the film The Second Time Around

== See also ==
- Western Star (disambiguation)
- Star of the East (disambiguation)
