= The Westerly =

Building in Portland, Oregon, U.S.

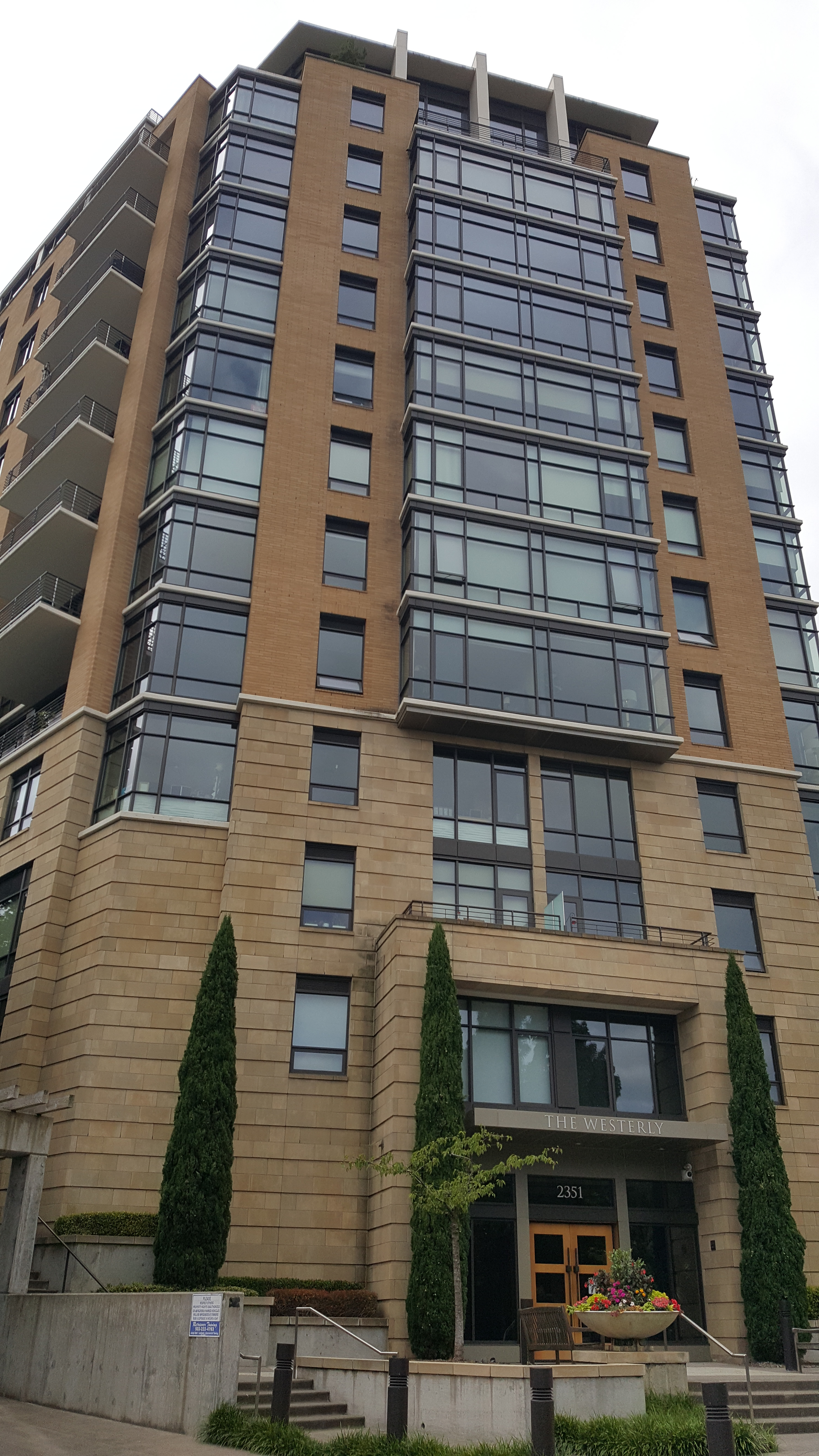
- The building's exterior in 2022

- Location within Portland, Oregon

General information
- Type: Residential
- Architectural style: Postmodern
- Location: Portland, Oregon, United States
- Coordinates: 45.52469°N 122.70035°W
- Construction started: 2006
- Completed: 2008

Technical details
- Floor count: 14

Design and construction
- Developer: Homer Williams

The Westerly, also known as the 24th Place Condominiums, is a 14-floor high-rise building in Northwest Portland, Oregon, in the United States. It is located at 2351 NW Westover Road in the Hillside neighborhood. Construction of the building began in 2006, and was completed in 2008.

== Description and history ==
In 2004, the Portland Tribune reported, "The Northwest District Association has filed multiple appeals to its neighborhood plan to the state Land Use Board of Appeals, including stopping 'bonus height' provisions north of West Burnside Street. The extended height, approved by the City Council, sparked plans for the proposed 147-foot 24th Place Condominiums on Northwest Westover Road right behind the Uptown Shopping Center. In response, attorneys for 24th Place condo developer Homer Williams filed a notice to respond to the appeals. A movement against the tower has its own website, www.stopuptowntower.com."

The building has 14 floors with more than 100 residential units. The final floor and roof were completed by August 2007. Homer Williams was the building's developer. Forty percent of its units had been sold by July 2007, during construction. The building's penthouse sold for $3,125,000 in June 2007.

Prices were reduced in 2008. In February 2009, The Oregonian said the condos opened just as the market was crashing and sales fell below expectations. In April, the newspaper said developers struggled to sell condos and ground-level retail spaces in the building because of the Great Recession.

== See also ==
- Architecture of Portland, Oregon
- List of tallest buildings in Portland, Oregon
