= Frank Emerson Wheelock =

American politician (1863–1932)

1st Mayor of Lubbock, Texas
- In office 1909–1915
- Preceded by: first
- Succeeded by: Walter Francis Schenck

Personal details
- Born: November 4, 1863 Holland, New York, U.S.
- Died: June 28, 1932 (aged 69) Lubbock, Texas, U.S.
- Party: Democratic

Frank Emerson Wheelock (April 11, 1863 – June 28, 1932) was an American rancher and politician. He was the first mayor of Lubbock, Texas.

== Life ==
Frank Emerson Wheelock was born on April 11, 1863 in Holland, New York, the son of William Efner and Louisa Diane Farrington. Following his mother's death he relocated numerous times, to Wisconsin, Illinois, Minneapolis, before working at the IOA Ranch in Texas.

In 1890, John T. Lofton and James Harrison and Wheelock began establishing the new town of Lubbock, with Wheelock becoming the first mayor.

Wheelock died in Lubbock on June 28, 1932.
