= Tom Martin (Texas politician) =

American politician

33rd Mayor of Lubbock, Texas
- In office 2008–2012
- Preceded by: David A. Miller
- Succeeded by: Glen Robertson

Personal details
- Born: Thomas Allen Martin; December 31, 1948 Rome, New York, U.S.
- Died: March 27, 2018 (aged 69) Lubbock, Texas, U.S.
- Party: Republican
- Spouse: Karen Martin (since 1969)
- Education: Texas Tech University
- Profession: Police Officer, Professor

Thomas Allen Martin (December 31, 1948 – March 27, 2018) was an American politician who served as mayor of Lubbock, Texas, from 2008 to 2012. He was a member of the Lubbock City Council from 2002 to 2006. Prior to seeking elected office, he had a career in law enforcement in Lubbock, Grapevine, and San Marcos, Texas. He has served as an instructor of criminal justice and political science at Wayland Baptist University's Lubbock campus. Although Texas elections for mayors are explicitly nonpartisan, Martin is regarded as a Republican.

Martin was a defender of maintaining confidentiality on the e-mail messages of city officials on public e-mail accounts and cellphones. In 2009 he was involved in a dispute with Attorney General of Texas Greg Abbott who had issued a "ruling that made public text messages between City Council members related to city business sent on their personal phones" (the dispute had arisen from the firing of Lubbock's liaison for homeland security).

Martin has insisted on the correct pronunciation of "Lubbock" as /ˈlʌbək/.

Martin lost re-election in 2012 to Glen Robertson by a margin of 30 points. One Lubbock resident (who had previously supported Martin but who went for Robertson in 2012) cited Martin's "dedication and countless hours" and explained the magnitude of the election margin as being an undercurrent of concerns about increasing debt and spending, and the escalating reliance on hidden taxes on water bills to fund unrelated departments.

In 1969 Martin married Karen Leckie Martin, a registered nurse and schoolteacher. The Martins were actively involved members of Lubbock's First Cumberland Presbyterian Church.

Martin died on March 27, 2018, from cancer at the age of 69.
