= Chery Eastar =

Mid-size sedan

The Chery Eastar (Chinese: 东方之子, Oriental Sun) is a mid-size car produced by the Chinese manufacturer Chery.

== First Generation ==
Chery Eastar (B11)
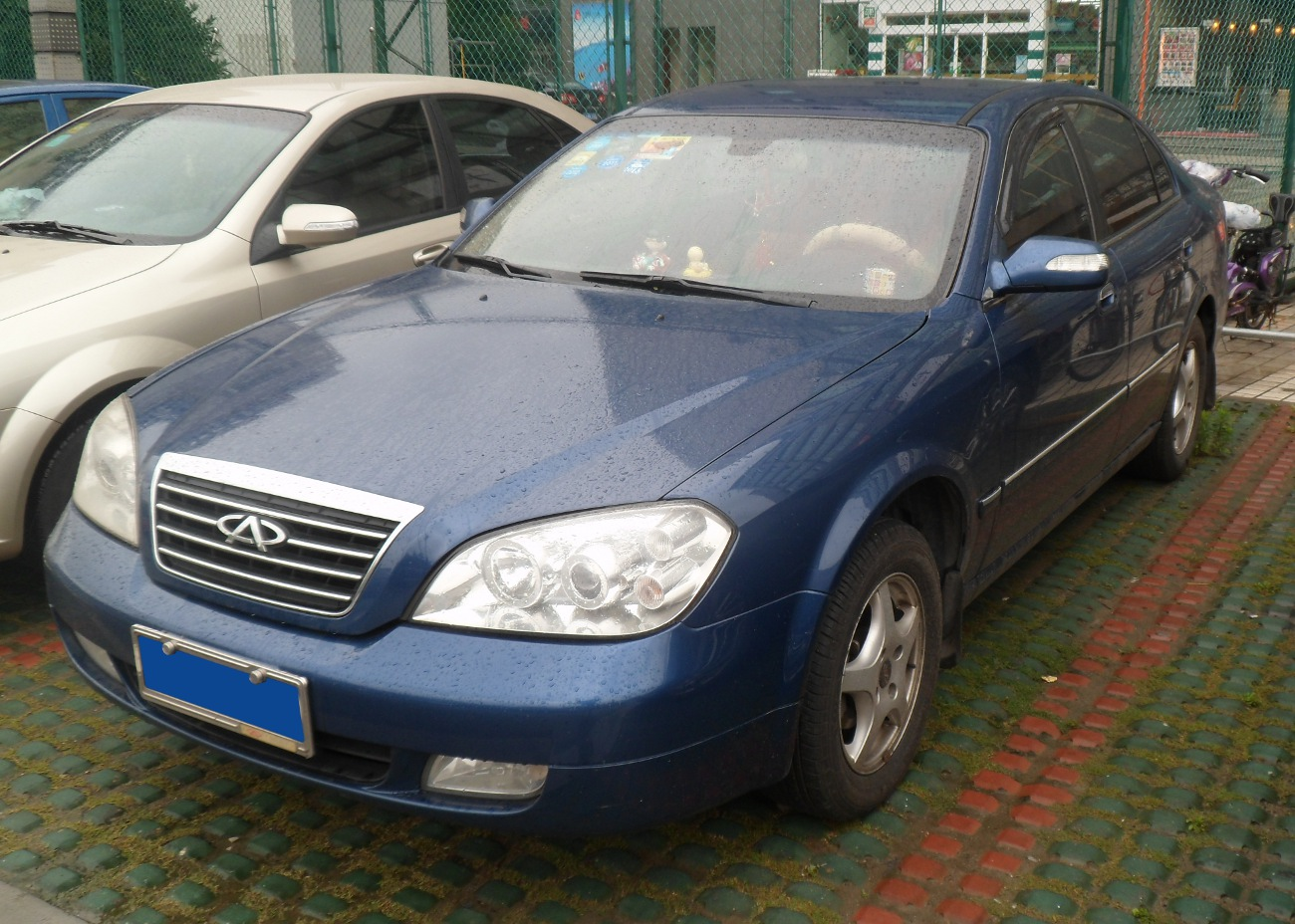

Overview
- Manufacturer: Chery
- Also called: Chery Cowin 5 Oriental Sun; Speranza A620 (Egypt)
- Production: 2004–2011
- Assembly: Wuhu, Anhui, China; Ukraine: Zaporizhzhia (AvtoZAZ)

Body and chassis
- Class: Mid-size car
- Body style: 4-door saloon
- Layout: Front-engine, front-wheel-drive

Powertrain
- Engine: 1.8 L SQR481FC I4 (petrol); 2.0 L 4G63 I4 (petrol); 2.4 L 4G64 I4 (petrol)
- Transmission: 5-speed manual 5-speed automatic

Dimensions
- Wheelbase: 2,700 mm (106.3 in) (Cowin 5)
- Length: 4,770 mm (187.8 in) (Cowin 5)
- Width: 1,815 mm (71.5 in) (Cowin 5)
- Height: 1,445 mm (56.9 in) (Cowin 5)

The styling is controversial for heavily resembling the first generation Chevrolet Epica/Daewoo Magnus sedan. A limousine version and parade car versions were also produced. The Eastar received a major facelift in 2012 and was also sold as the Chery Cowin 5 to be inline with the other Cowin sub-brand products.

=== Gallery ===
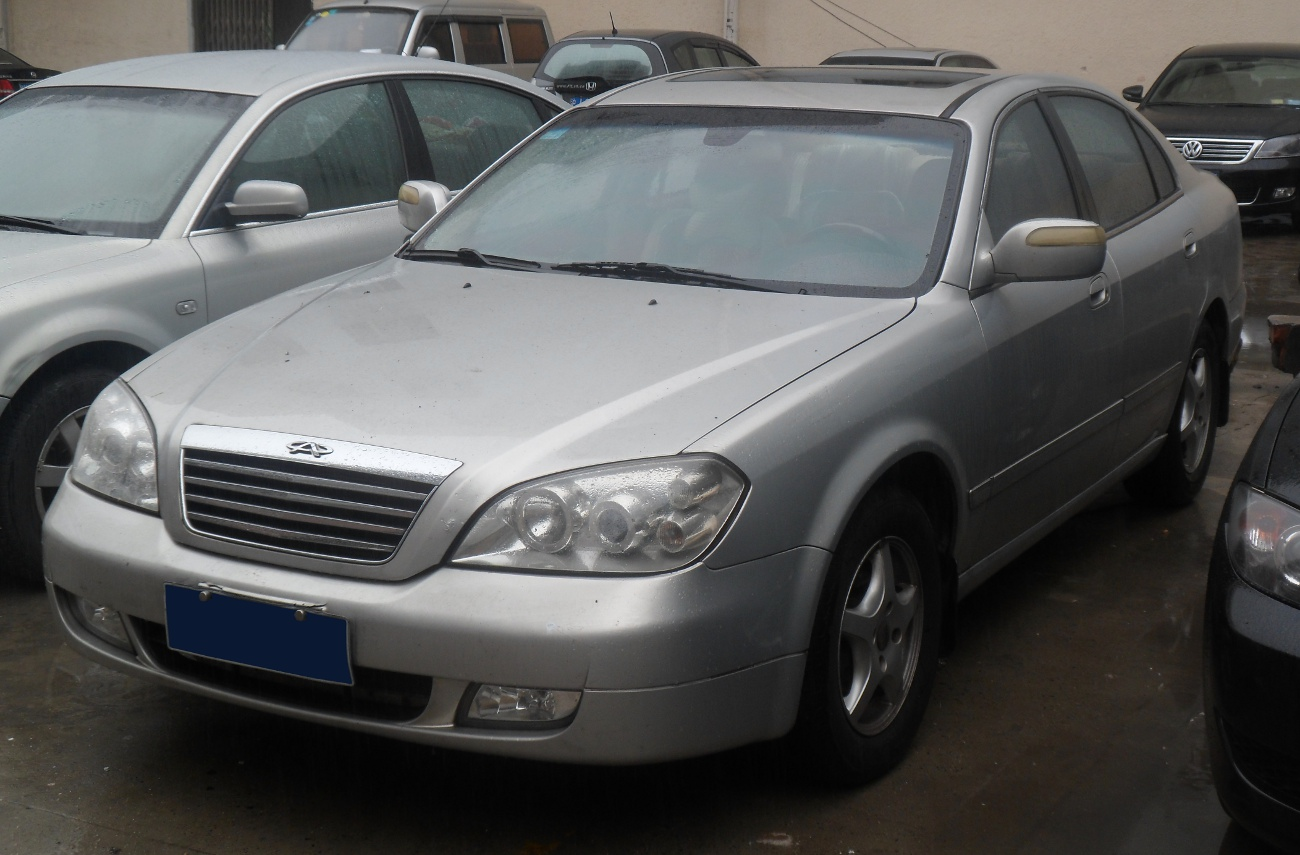
Chery Eastar I front prefacelift

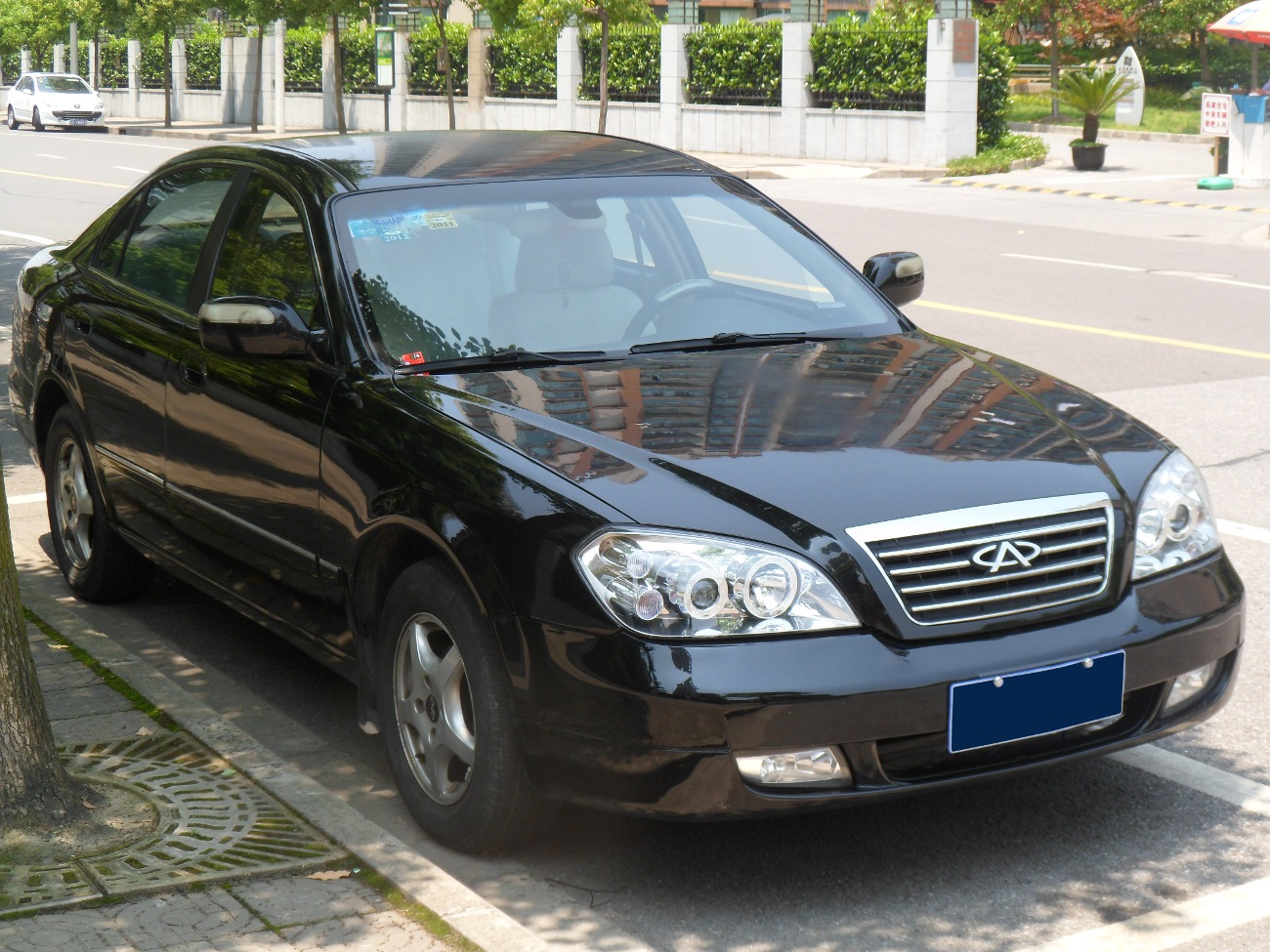
Chery Eastar I front post-facelift

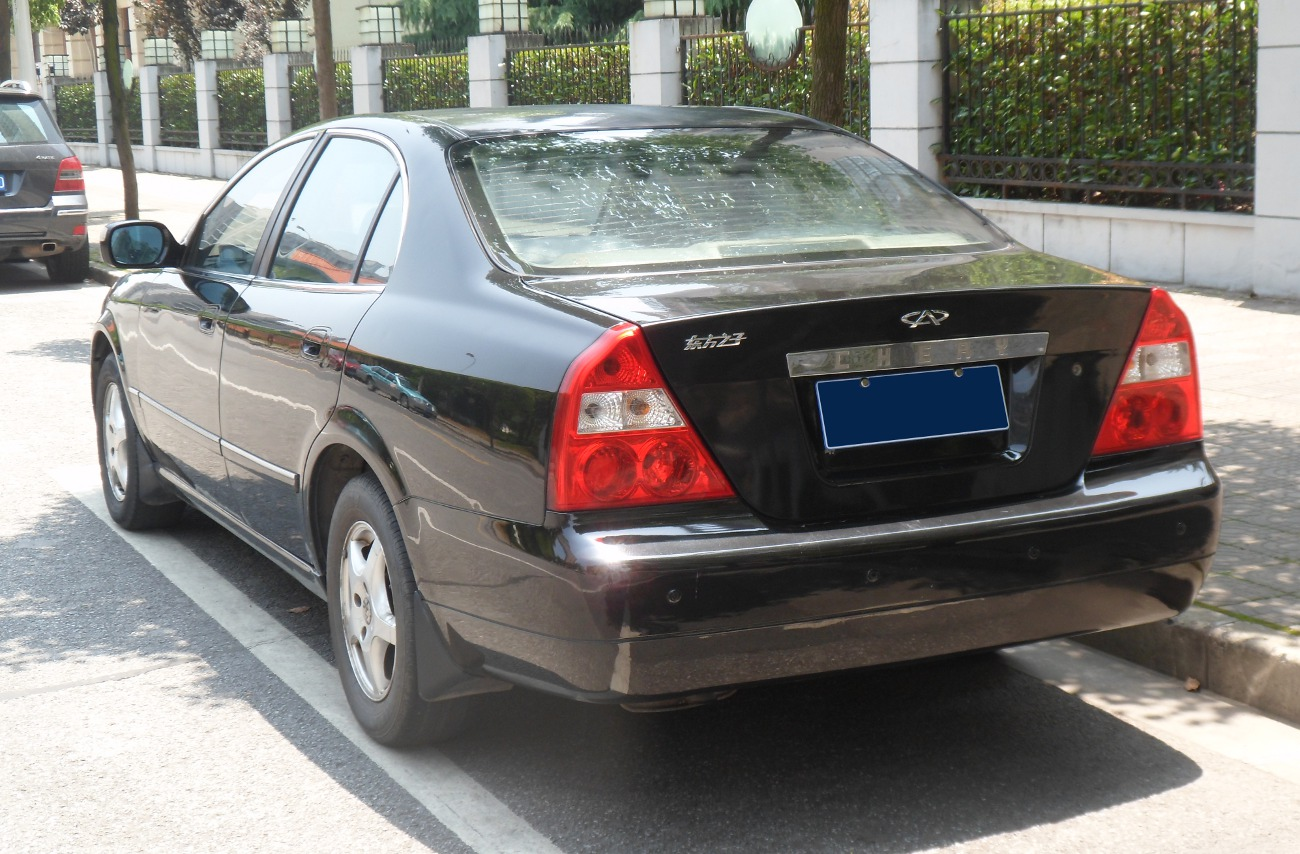
Chery Eastar I rear post-facelift

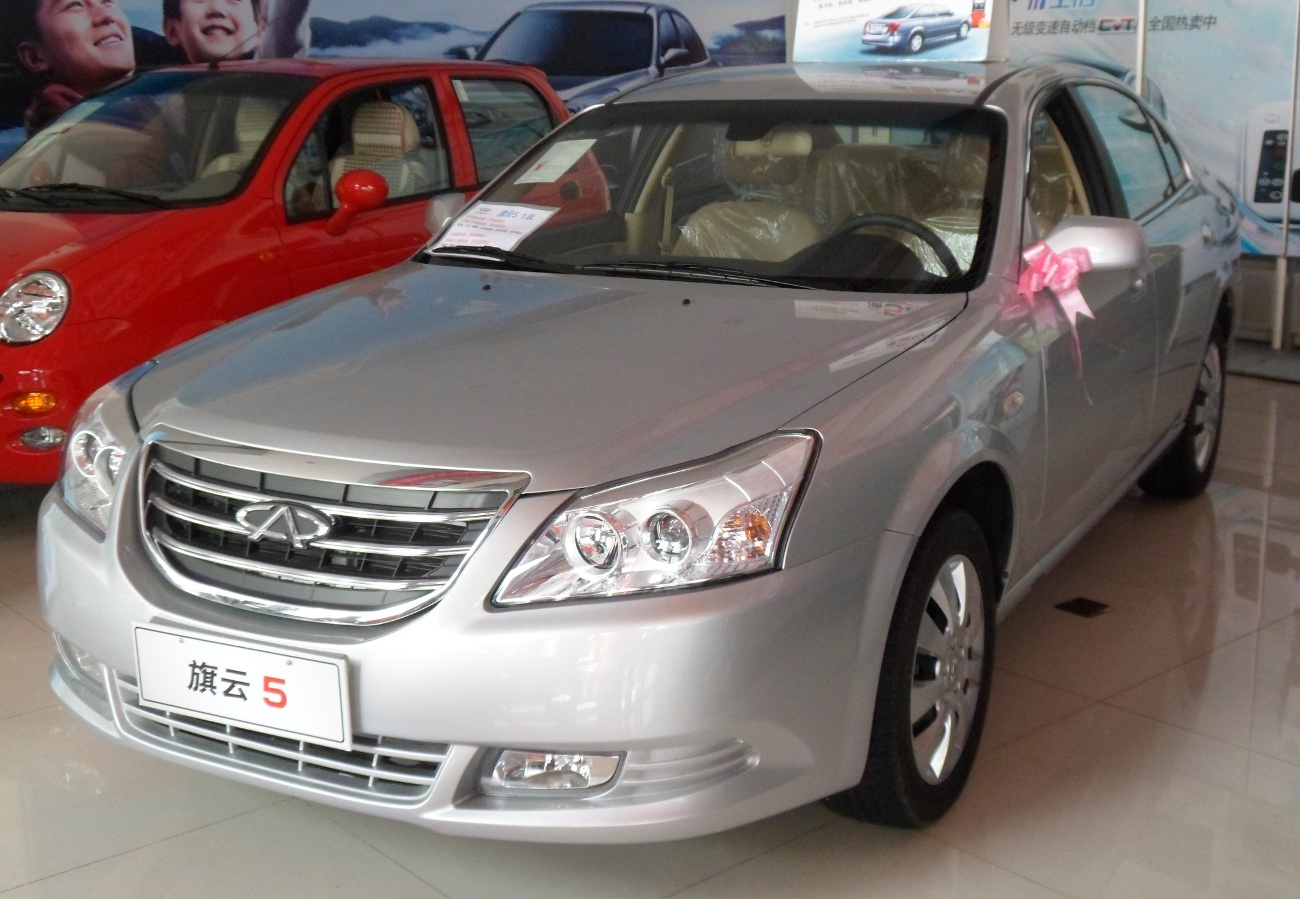
Chery Cowin 5

== Second Generation ==
Chery Eastar (B16)
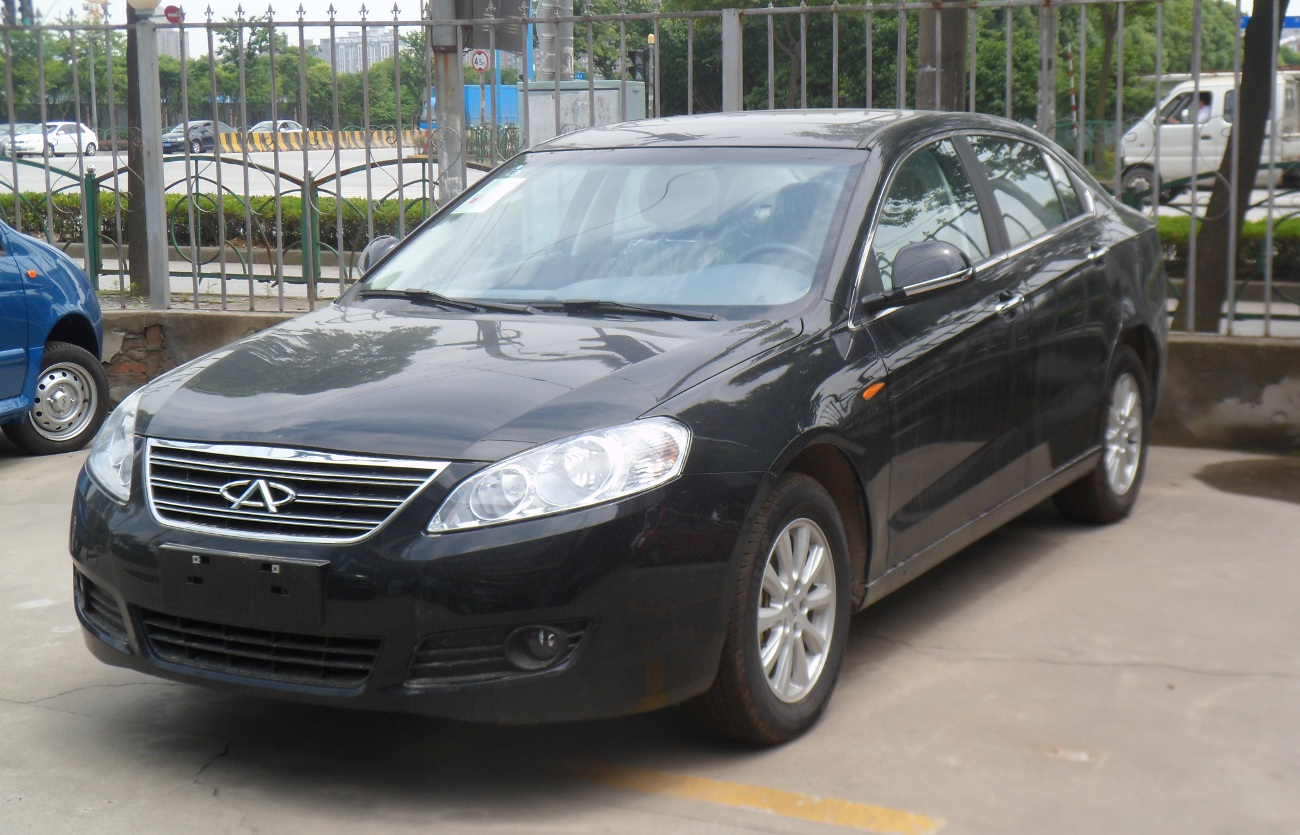

Overview
- Manufacturer: Chery
- Also called: Chery E8; Oriental Sun
- Production: 2012–2016
- Assembly: Wuhu, Anhui, China

Body and chassis
- Class: Mid-size car
- Body style: 4-door saloon
- Layout: Front-engine, front-wheel-drive
- Related: Chery Eastar Cross

Powertrain
- Engine: 1.8 L SQR481FC I4 (petrol); 2.0 L SQR484F I4 (petrol)
- Transmission: 5-speed manual 4-speed automatic CVT

Dimensions
- Wheelbase: 2,768 mm (109.0 in)
- Length: 4,886 mm (192.4 in)
- Width: 1,840 mm (72.4 in)
- Height: 1,500 mm (59.1 in)
- Curb weight: 1,520 kg (3,351 lb)

The Chery Eastar II (or Chery E8) is a mid-size car produced by the Chinese manufacturer Chery since 2012. A station wagon version was also available named the Chery Eastar Cross.

=== Engines ===
The car is powered by a choice of two four-cylinder petrol engines: a 1.8-litre 97 kW (130 hp; 132 PS), with a torque of 170 N⋅m (125 lb⋅ft; 17 kg⋅m) and a 2.0-litre (1971 cc), developing a maximum power of 102 kW (137 hp; 139 PS) at 5750 rpm, with a peak torque of 182 N⋅m (134 lb⋅ft; 19 kg⋅m) at 4300 to 4500 rpm.

=== Gallery ===
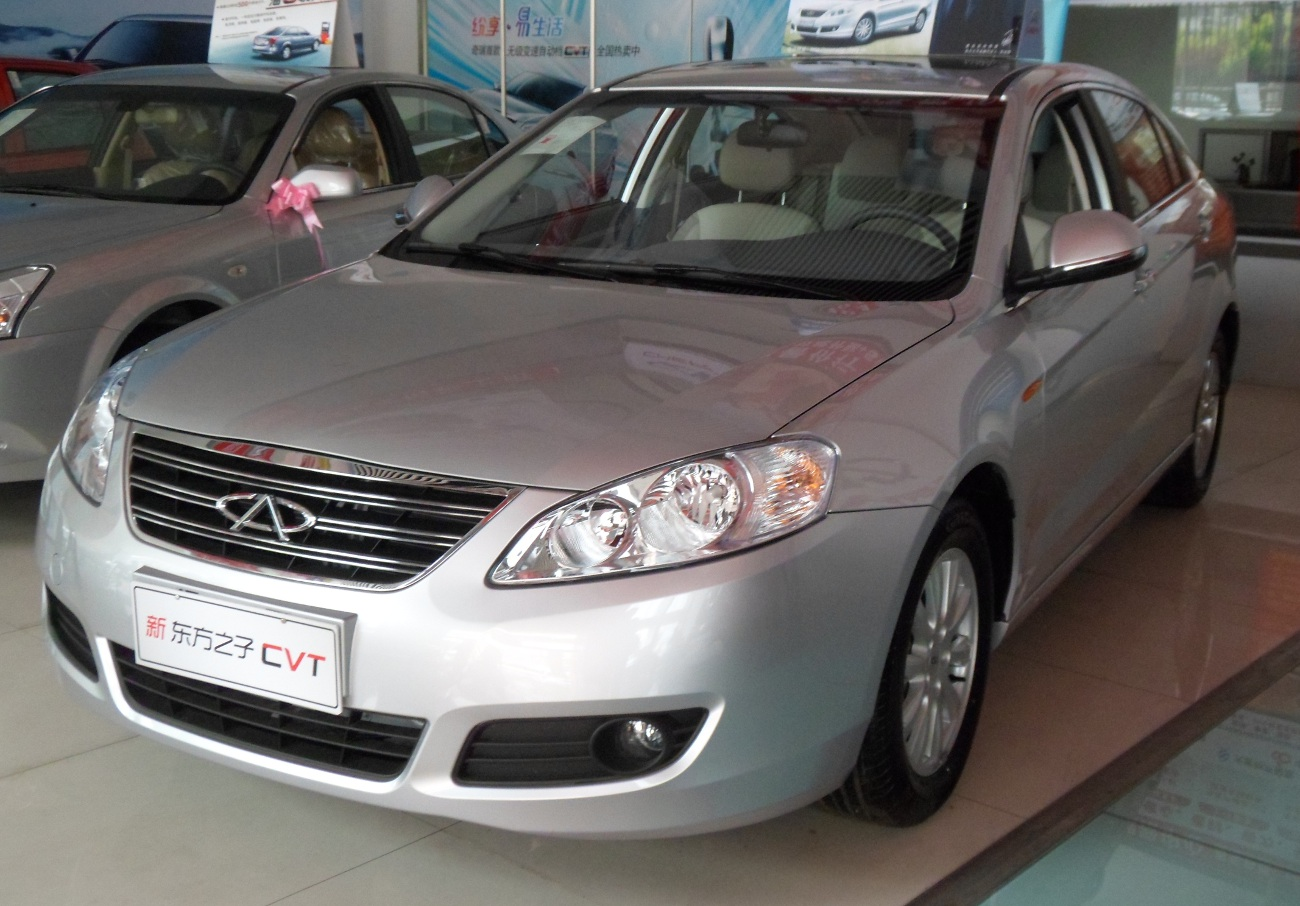
Chery Eastar II front

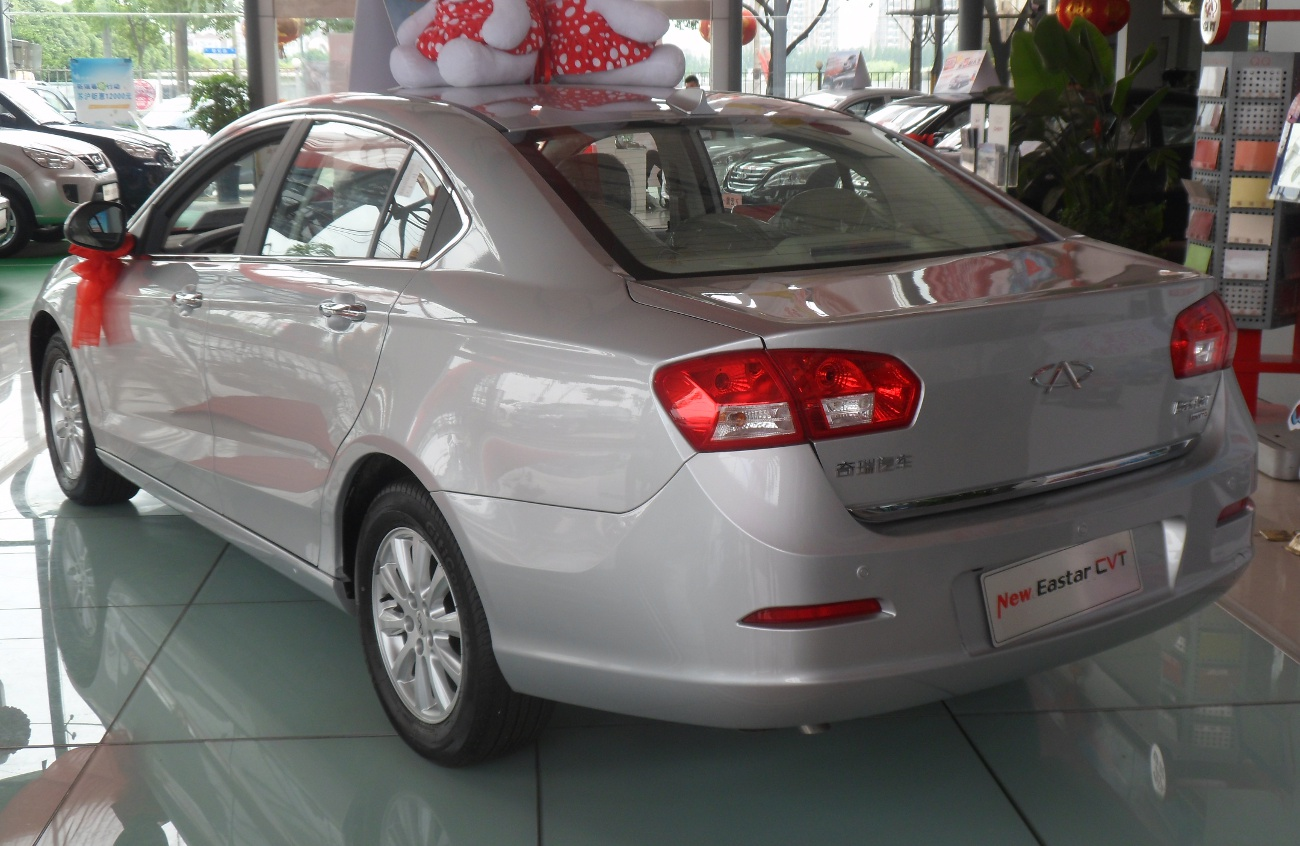
Chery Eastar II rear
