= Chery Eastar Cross =

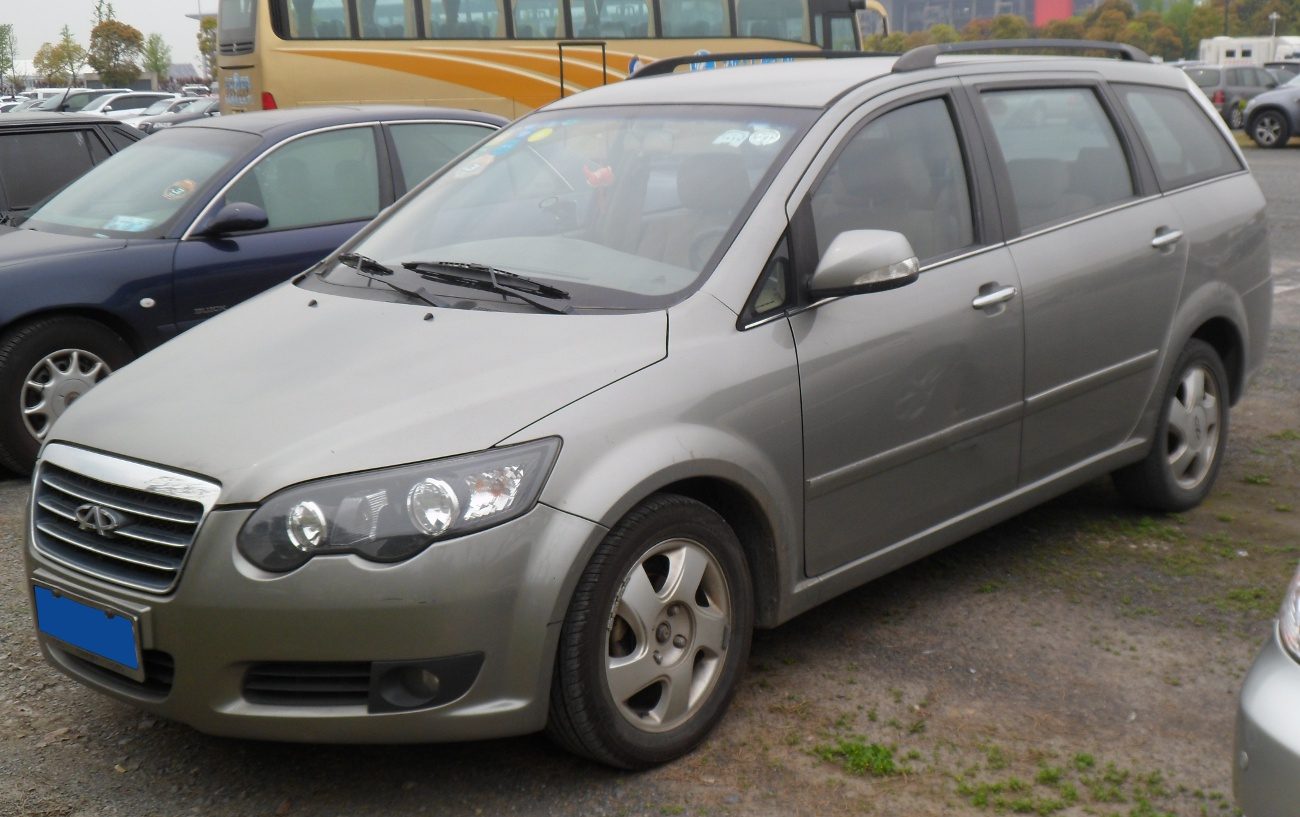
- Chery Eastar Cross

Overview
- Manufacturer: Chery
- Also called: Chery V5; Chery B14; Chery Boss (Turkey); Chery Destiny (Chile); Chery Eastar ES; Chery Cross (Thailand); Rely V5
- Production: 2006–2015
- Assembly: Wuhu, Anhui, China (Chery Automobile Co., Ltd.); Johor Bahru, Malaysia (Berjaya Assembly Sdn. Bhd.)

Body and chassis
- Class: Minivan
- Body style: 5-door minivan
- Layout: Front-engine, front-wheel-drive
- Related: Chery Eastar

Powertrain
- Engine: petrol: 1.8 L SQRE481FC I4; 2.0 L SQRE484F I4; 2.4 L 4G64 I4; diesel: 1.9 L SQR481A turbo I4
- Transmission: 6-speed manual 5-speed manual 4-speed automatic

Dimensions
- Wheelbase: 2,800 mm (110.2 in)
- Length: 4,662 mm (183.5 in)
- Width: 1,820 mm (71.7 in)
- Height: 1,590 mm (62.6 in)
- Curb weight: 1,505 kg (3,318 lb)

Chronology
- Successor: Chery Arrizo M7

The Chery Eastar Cross (Chinese: 东方之子Cross), also known as Chery V5, is a minivan produced by the Chinese manufacturer Chery Automobile from June 2006 to 2015.

== History ==
The Chery V5 or Eastar Cross was originally revealed at the Beijing Motor Show in 2004 by Chinese manufacturer Chery, the original Eastar Cross is built on the same platform, as the second generation Chery Eastar and served as the estate version of the Eastar mid-size sedan. Chery unveiled their updated V5 at the Hangzhou Motor Show on 5 June 2015.

In September 2009 it debuts a slight restyle and is renamed Rely V5 in the Chinese market, where Rely on indicates the new sub-brand created by Chery to market MPVs and off-roaders. With this restyling, it gains a new chrome grille and new interior trim, as well as improved trim.

The V5 is a crossover combining estate with MPV and seats up to seven, and is rebadged and sold as the Rely on V5 in China and Chery Destiny in certain foreign markets.

== Markets ==
Chile

In Chile, the V5 is marketed as the Chery Destiny.

Malaysia

The Chery V5 was first introduced in Malaysia on 2 July 2006. It came with a 2.0 liter petrol engine and was called the Chery B14.

A locally assembled version was launched on 3 September 2008 and was sold as the Chery Eastar. Unlike the earlier version, this model came with a 2.4 liter SOHC Mitsubishi long-stroke engine producing 127 hp (95 kW) at 5,500 rpm and 198 N⋅m (146 lbf⋅ft) of torque at 3,000 rpm. It is mated to a 4-speed automatic transmission with manual shifting. It came with 1 year free service (for the first 1,000 units sold) and a 3+2 year warranty.

Later, while opening a 3S center in Section 13, Petaling Jaya, they launched a version called the "ST". It added a new grille, LED running lights, a bodykit as well as some improvements to the interior material and trim. The vehicle, available only in a red exterior shade, went for RM96,888 on-the-road. June 2013 saw Chery Malaysia launch the Eastar XT.

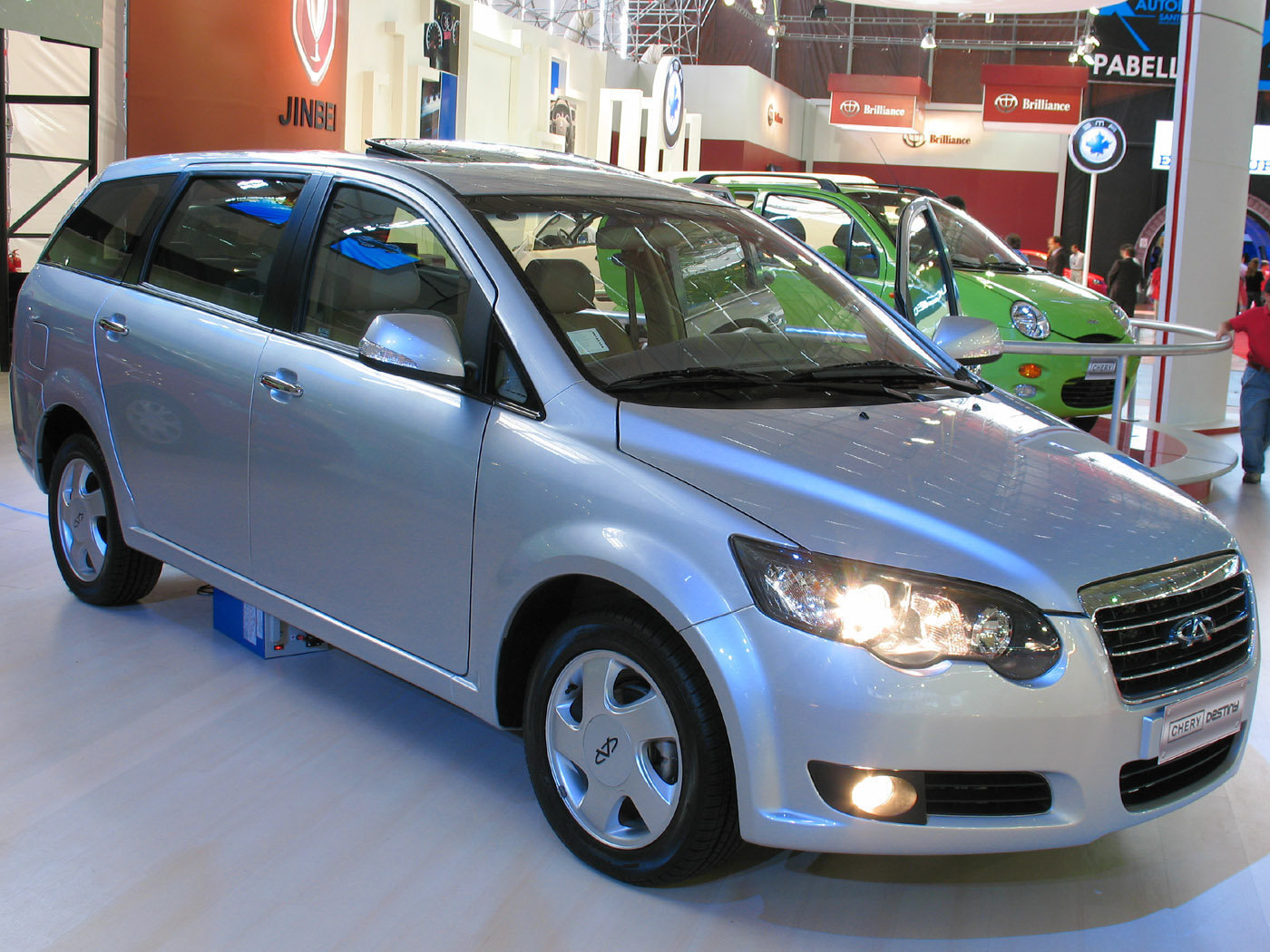
Chery Destiny 2.0 2008 (Chile)

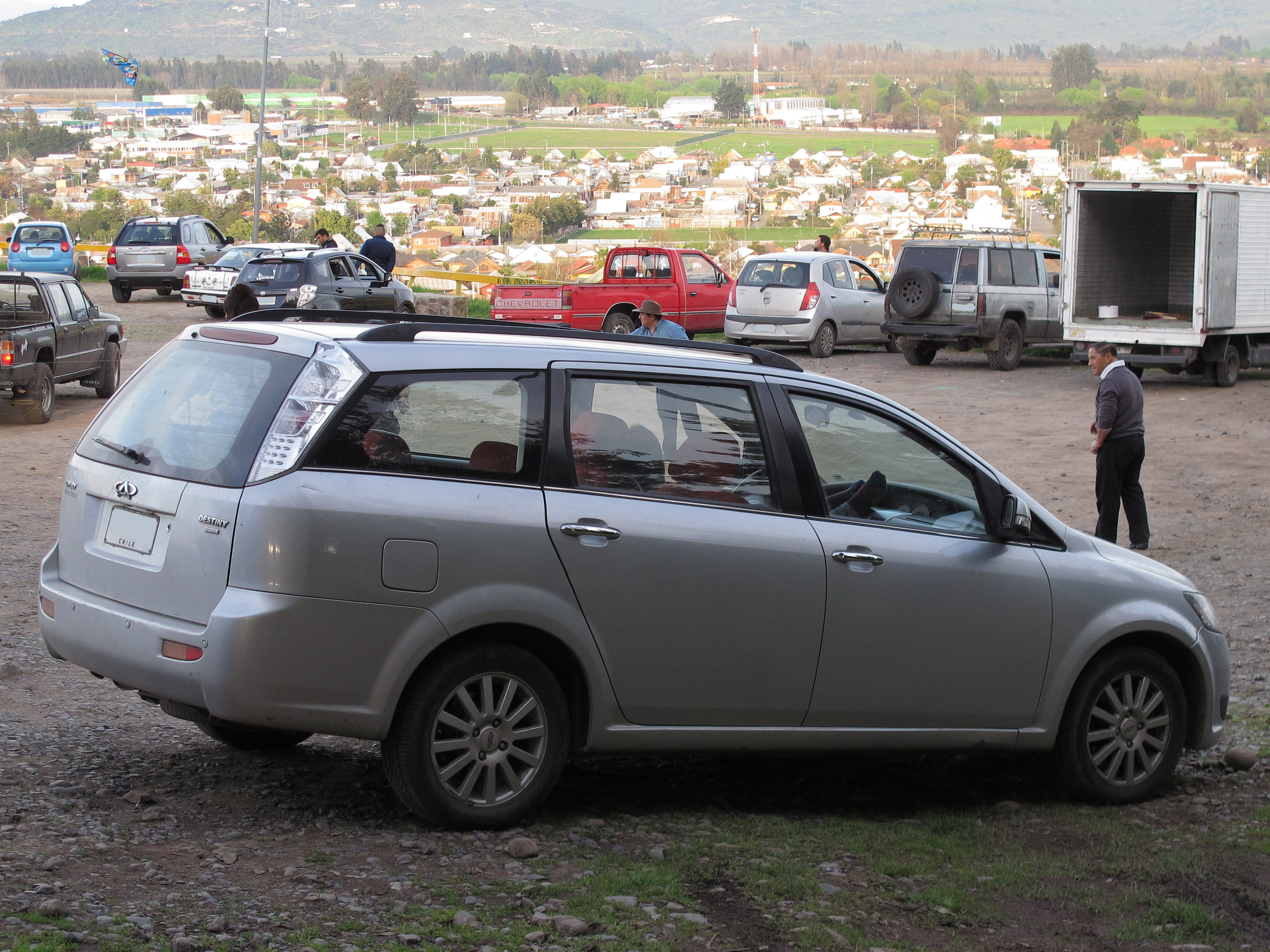
Chery Destiny 2.0 2011 (rear)

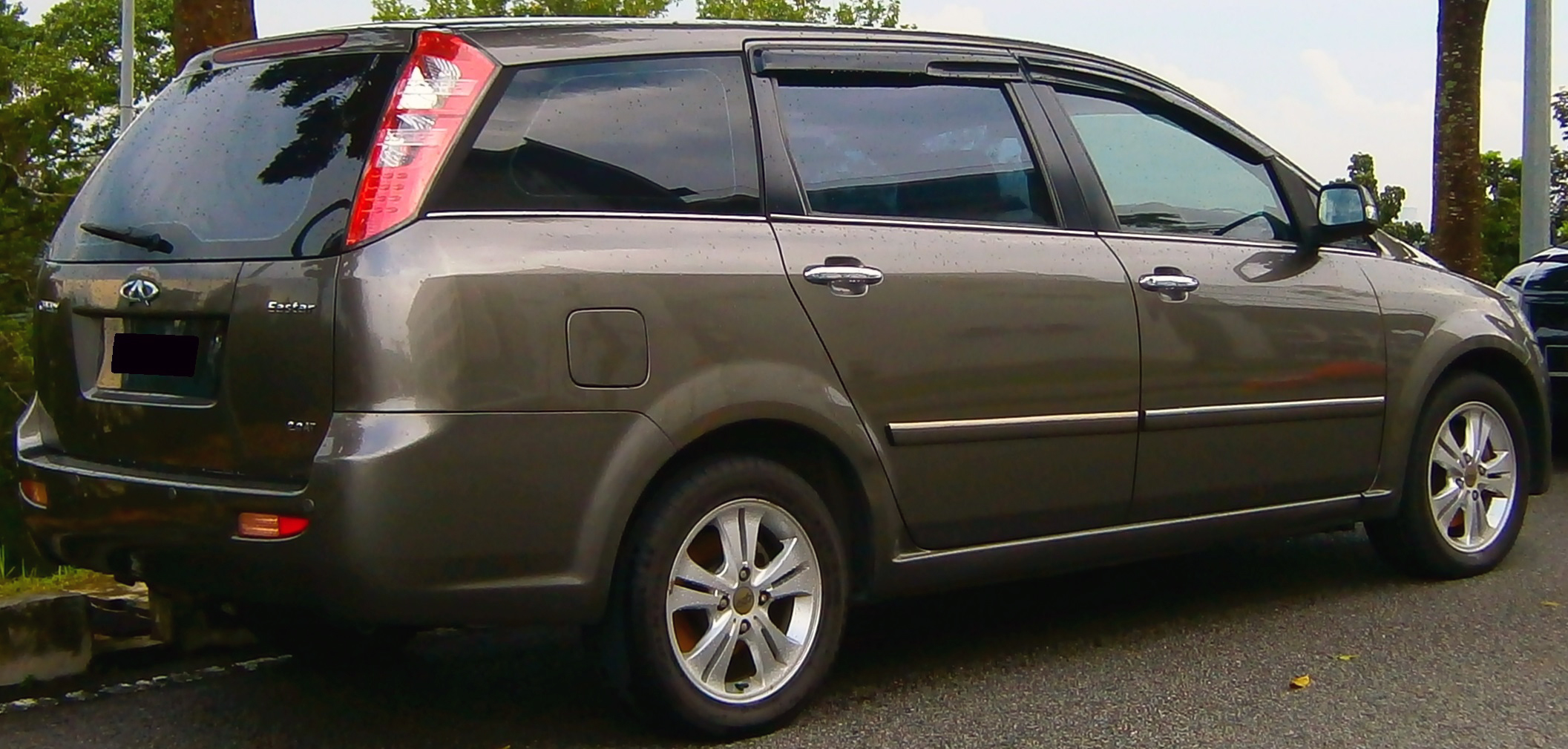
2010 Chery Eastar 2.0 (rear; Malaysia)

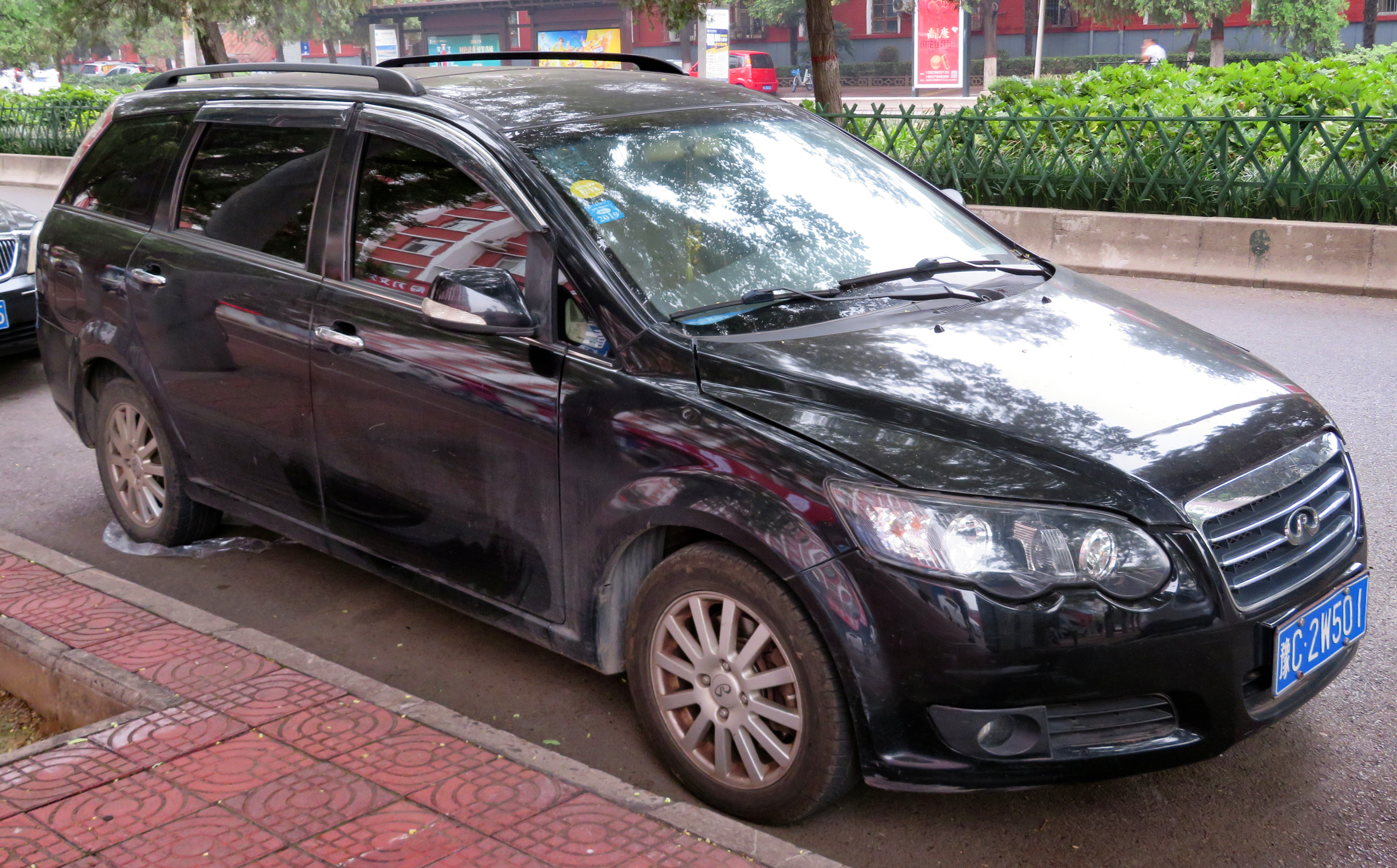
Rely V5

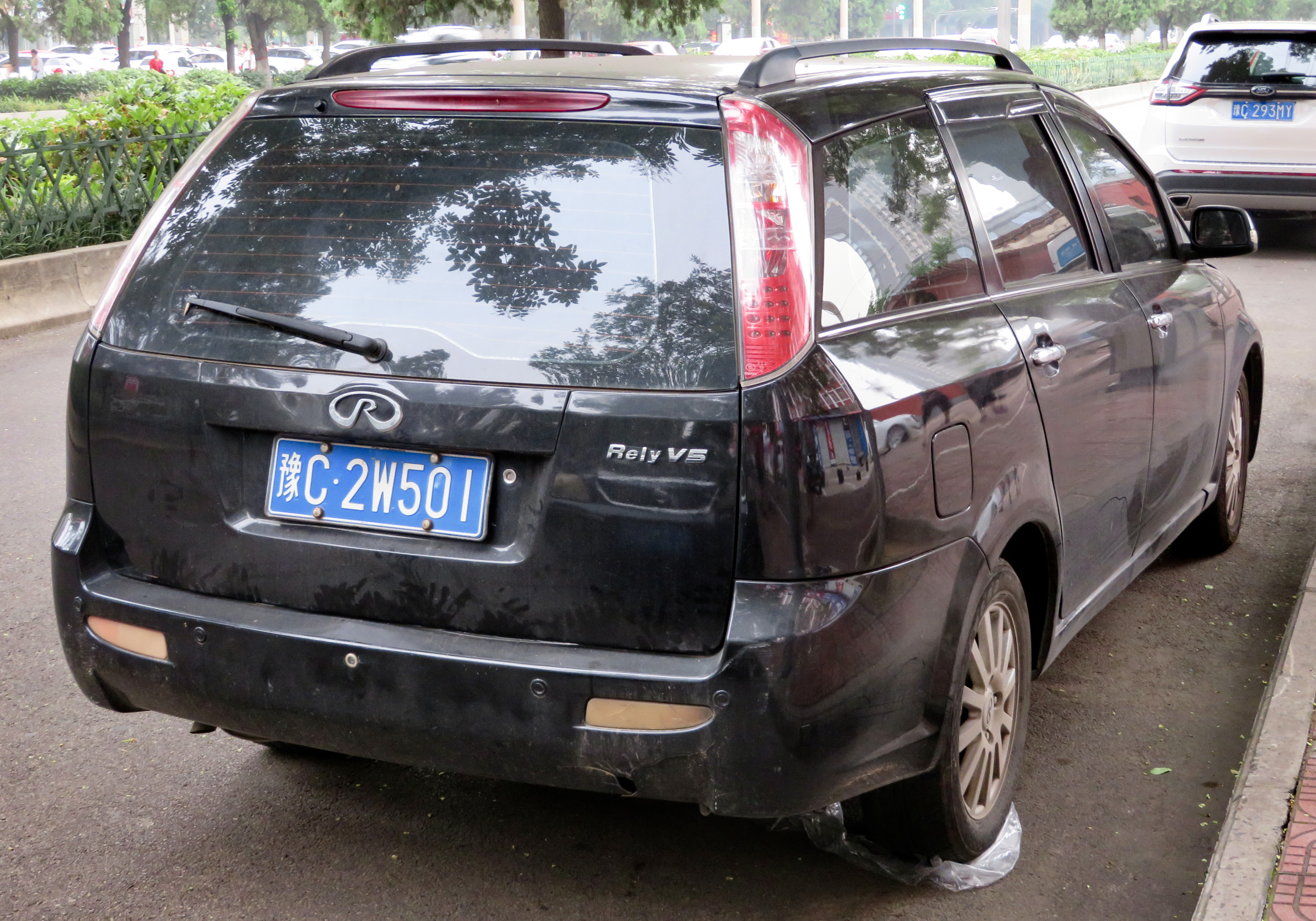
Rely V5 (rear)
