= Easter (surname) =

Easter is a surname. Notable people with the surname include:

- David Easter (born 1959), English actor
- Graham Easter (born 1969), English footballer
- Jack Easter (1907–1979), Australian politician
- Jamal Easter (born 1987), Welsh Association Football player
- Jeff & Sheri Easter, Southern Gospel duo
- Jermaine Easter (born 1982), Welsh Association Football player
- Luke Easter (baseball) (1915–1979), professional baseball player in Major League Baseball and the Negro leagues
- Luke Easter (musician), singer and songwriter with the Christian metal band Tourniquet
- Mark Easter (born 1982), rugby union player born in Swaziland
- Melanie Easter (born 1972), British paralympic swimmer and cyclist
- Mitch Easter (born 1954), American musician and producer
- Nick Easter (born 1978), English rugby union player
- Paul Easter (born 1963), Scottish freestyle swimmer
- Wayne Easter (born 1949), Canadian politician
