= David A. Miller =

Mayor of Lubbock, Texas from 2006–2008

32nd Mayor of Lubbock, Texas
- In office 2006–2008
- Preceded by: Marc McDougal
- Succeeded by: Thomas Allen Martin

Personal details
- Born: David Miller; February 11, 1948 (age 78) Oklahoma City, Oklahoma
- Party: Republican

David A. Miller was the 32nd mayor of Lubbock, Texas from 2006-2008. A member of the Republican Party, Miller is considered one of Lubbock's most conservative mayors.
