= Easter (band) =

German electropop duo

- Origin: Berlin, Germany
- Genres: Electropop
- Years active: 2005–present
- Members: Stix Omar; Max Boss
- Website: easterjesus.com

Easter (stylised in all caps) are a German electropop duo consisting of Norwegian vocalist Stix Omar and German Max Boss. The duo formed in Berlin and released their debut album Ur a Great Babe in 2011.

The band's artistic and minimalistic electropop music discusses themes such as sexuality and hedonism through abstract lyrics. The vocalist is recognizable for their "monotone, half-spoken vocals". The band has toured in Europe and Americas.

== Discography ==
=== Studio albums ===
- Ur a Great Babe (2011)
- The Softest Hard (2012)

=== Extended plays ===
- New Cuisine Pt. 1 (2014)
- New Cuisine Pt. 2 (2016)
- She Is Warm (2019)
