= Glen Robertson =

34th Mayor of Lubbock, Texas
- In office May 19, 2012 – May 17, 2016
- Preceded by: Tom Martin
- Succeeded by: Dan Pope

Personal details
- Born: Glen Charles Robertson; May 20, 1959 (age 67) Lubbock, Texas
- Party: Republican
- Spouse: Karen Lynn Phillips Robertson
- Children: Jason Robertson; Jeremy Robertson; Jared Robertson; Stepson Kirby Phillips

Glen Charles Robertson (born 1959) is an American politician who served two terms as mayor of Lubbock, from May 19, 2012 until May 17, 2016.

Robertson was an unsuccessful Republican candidate in the runoff election held on May 24, 2016, for Texas's 19th congressional district seat, which was vacated in January 2017 by the Republican Randy Neugebauer of Lubbock, who has filled the position since 2003. Robertson was defeated by Jodey Arrington, a former vice chancellor of Texas Tech University and an official in the administration of former U.S. President George W. Bush. Arrington polled 25,214 votes (53.7 percent) to Robertson's 21,769 (46.3 percent).

Robertson had led a nine-candidate field in the primary election on March 1 with 27,791 (26.7 percent) of the ballots cast, followed by Arrington's 26,980 (26 percent). In third place was Michael Bob Starr, the former commander of Dyess Air Force Base who led handily in Abilene and finished with 22,256 votes (21.4 percent). Laredo surgeon Donald R. May finished fourth in the primary with 9,592 votes (9.2 percent). In the first phase of the campaign, Robertson had questioned Starr’s participation in the LGBT "Fun Run" at Dyess Air Force Base. Mayor Norm Archibald of Abilene said that he believed the advertisement backfired on Robertson in the runoff campaign against Arrington.

== Background ==
Robertson attended Texas Tech in Lubbock from 1976 to 1978.

== Career ==
=== Politics ===
In the 2012 Lubbock mayoral election, a non-partisan contest under Texas law, Robertson unseated Tom Martin by 30 percentage points—a result thought to be related to voter perceptions that municipal "taxes" had increased in the form of fees. One Lubbock resident (who had previously supported Martin but who went for Robertson in 2012) cited Martin's "dedication and countless hours" but explained the magnitude of the election margin as being an undercurrent of concerns about increasing debt and spending, and the escalating reliance on hidden taxes on water bills to fund unrelated departments.

Shortly after inauguration Robertson announced his support for building an electricity plant powered by natural gas and for changes in the structure of water fees to emphasize conservation. Robertson told the West Texas Home Builders Association that he resists untested experiments to address Lubbock's utility situation: "I don't want to be the first Christian to face the lion, because he got the biggest and the meanest lion."

In January 2015, Robertson said that he might run against Representative Neugebauer in the 2016 election. Robertson cited his unhappiness with what he called Neugebauer's failure to bolster the cotton industry. In March, Robertson said that he would not run for Congress but would instead seek re-election as mayor.

Then, on October 13, 2015, Robertson announced his candidacy for Congress once Neugebauer decided not to run again. In the same announcement, Robertson said that he would vacate his position as mayor in May 2016 regardless of the outcome of the congressional race. After winning the May 7, 2016 general election, Dan Pope succeeded Robertson as mayor.

In February 2016, Robertson received national attention when he called upon a local Islamic group to take down a banner, reading "Love for All." He received widespread criticism when it was determined that Robertson did not attempt to find out what the banner said before he issued his complaint.

=== Business ===
Robertson had been a member of the Electric Utility Board. He serves on the board of directors of the West Texas Municipal Power Agency. He owns and operates Hillcrest Country Club and Robertson Bonded Warehouse, both in Lubbock.

== Electoral history ==
2012 Lubbock Mayoral Election
Party	Candidate	Votes	%
Nonpartisan	Glen Robertson	12,457	65.36
Nonpartisan	Tom Martin	6,603	34.64
Total votes		19,060	

U.S. House, Texas District 19 Republican Primary, 2016
Party	Candidate	Votes	%
Republican	Glen Robertson	27,868	26.8
Republican	Jodey Arrington	27,013	25.9
Republican	Michael Bob Starr	22,303	21.4
Republican	Donald May	9,616	9.2
Republican	Greg Garrett	8,309	8
Republican	Jason Corley	2,558	2.5
Republican	DeRenda Warren	2,323	2.2
Republican	Don Parrish	2,197	2.1
Republican	John Key	1,959	1.9
Total votes		104,146	

U.S. House, Texas District 19 Republican Runoff Primary, 2016
Party	Candidate	Votes	%
Republican	Jodey Arrington	25,322	53.7
Republican	Glen Robertson	21,832	46.3
Total votes		47,154	

== Personal life ==
Robertson is married to the former Karen Lynn Phillips. He has three sons from a previous marriage, Jason Robertson, Jeremy Robertson, Jared Robertson, and a stepson, Kirby Phillips.
