= Eastern Star =

Eastern Star may refer to:

- Order of the Eastern Star, Freemasonry-related fraternal organization
- Eastern Star Baptist Church, historic Baptist church in Tarboro, Edgecombe County, North Carolina, United States
- MV Eastern Star, or Dong Fang Zhi Xing, Chinese ship
- Eastern Star FC, football club from Vientiane, Laos

== See also ==
- Eastern Stars F.C.
- East Star (disambiguation)
- Order of the Star in the East
