= Chery E5 =

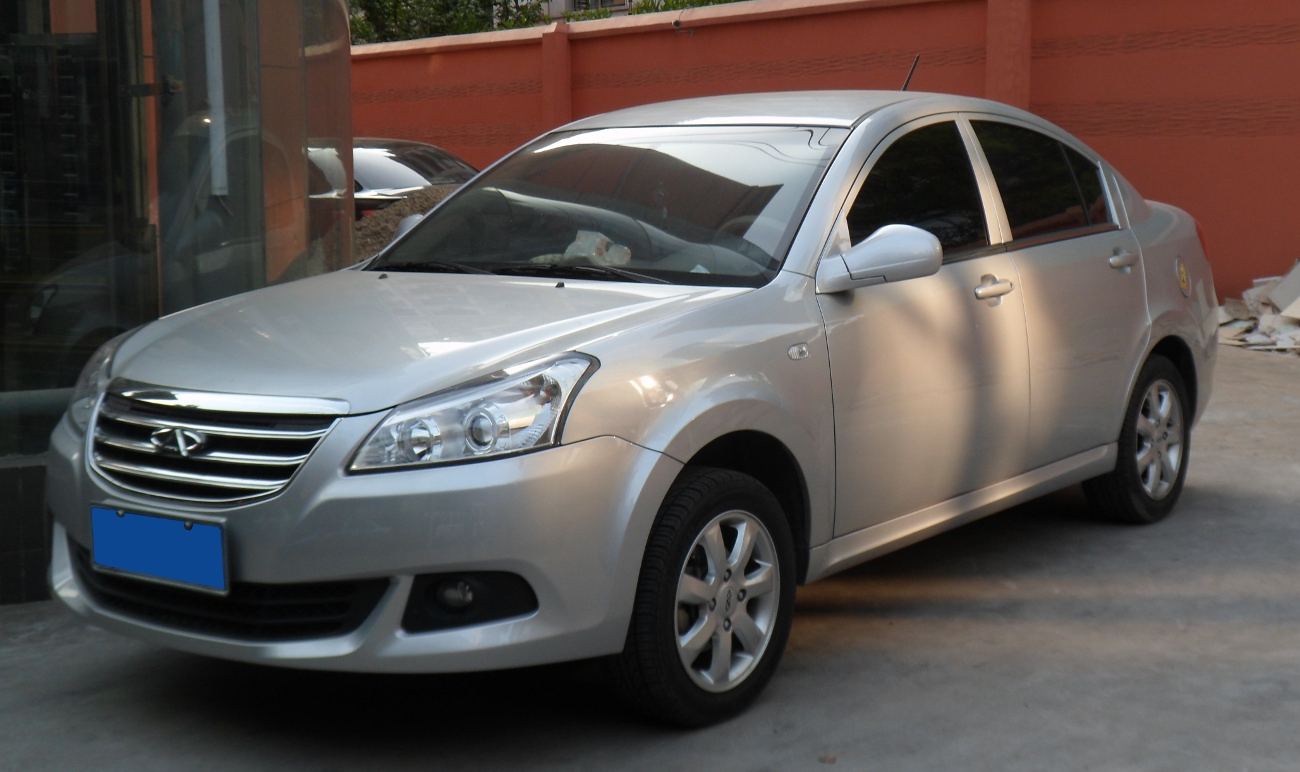

Overview
- Manufacturer: Chery
- Also called: Chery Riich G3; Vortex Estina FL-C (Russia); MVM 550 (Iran); Speranza Envy (Egypt)
- Production: 2011–2016
- Assembly: Wuhu, Anhui, China; Bam, Kerman, Iran

Body and chassis
- Class: Compact car
- Body style: 4-door saloon
- Layout: Front-engine, front-wheel-drive
- Related: Chery A5

Powertrain
- Engine: 1.5 L SQR477F I4 (petrol); 1.8 L SQR481FC I4 (petrol)
- Transmission: 5-speed manual CVT

Dimensions
- Wheelbase: 2,600 mm (102.4 in)
- Length: 4,580 mm (180.3 in)
- Width: 1,760 mm (69.3 in)
- Height: 1,483 mm (58.4 in)
- Curb weight: 1,285 kg (2,833 lb)

Chronology
- Predecessor: Chery A5
- Successor: Chery Arrizo 5

The Chery E5 is a compact car produced by the Chinese manufacturer Chery from 2011 to 2016. It is based on the same platform as the Chery A5.

== Features ==
The car is powered by a 1.5-litre petrol engine, developing a maximum power of 107 hp (80 kW) at 6000 rpm, with a peak torque of 140 N⋅m (14 m⋅kgf) at 4500 rpm. An automatic derivative is available in the Middle East with a 1.8-litre (1845 cc) petrol engine developing power of 130 hp (97 kW), with torque of 170 N⋅m (17 m⋅kgf).

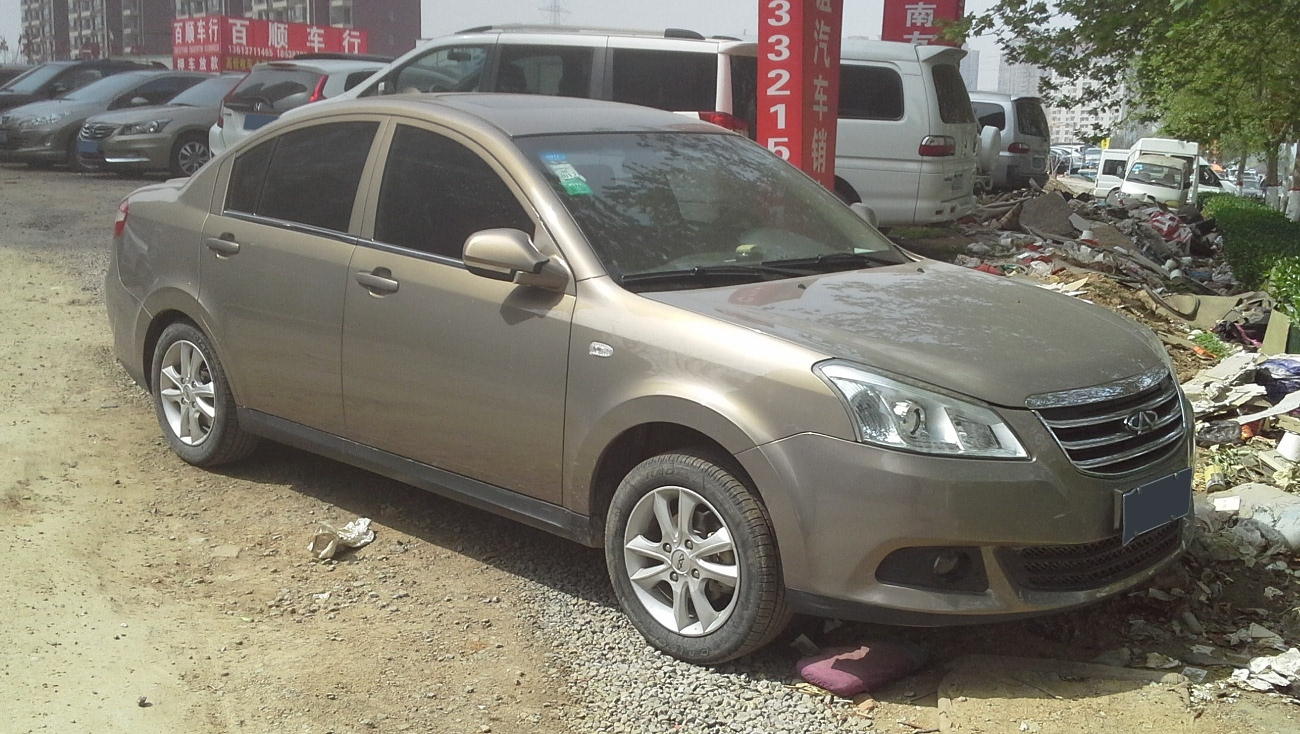
Chery E5 front

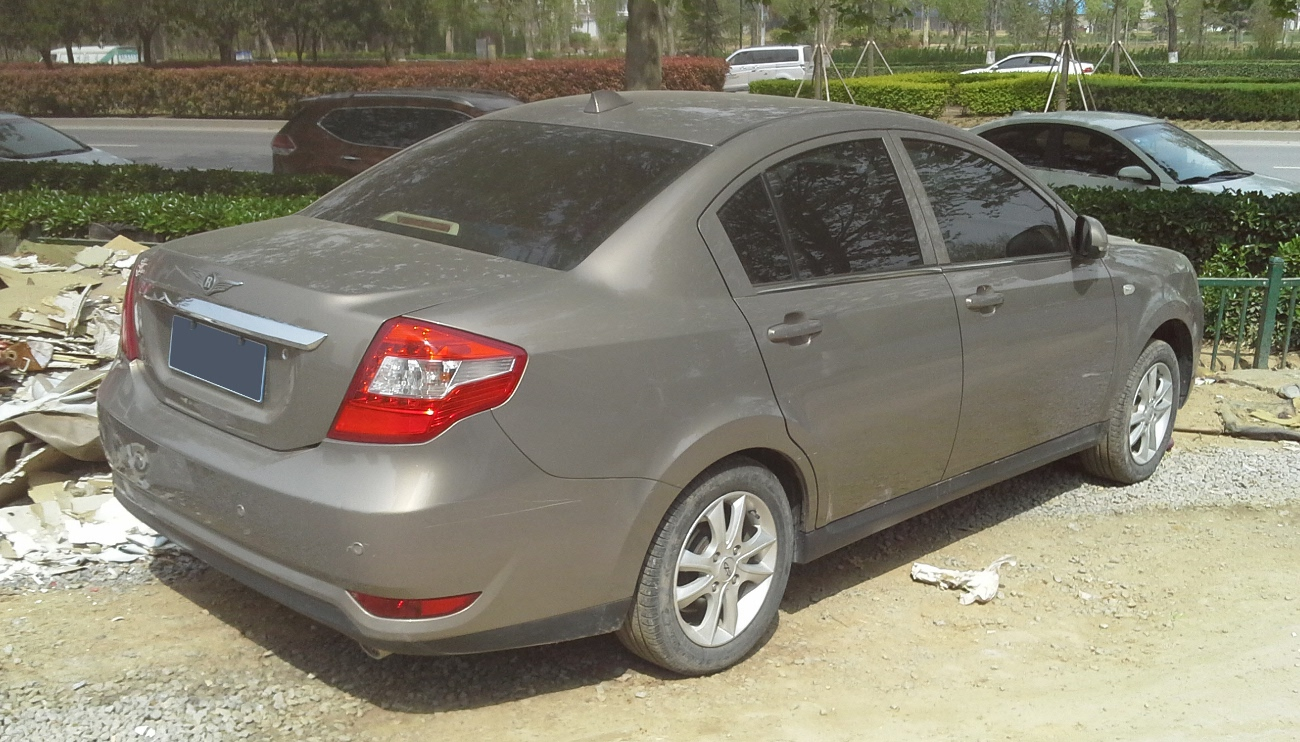
Chery E5 rear

== Riich G3 ==
The Riich G3 is a rebadged, redesigned and more premium version of the Chery E5 marketed under Riich, the premium brand of Chery at the time.

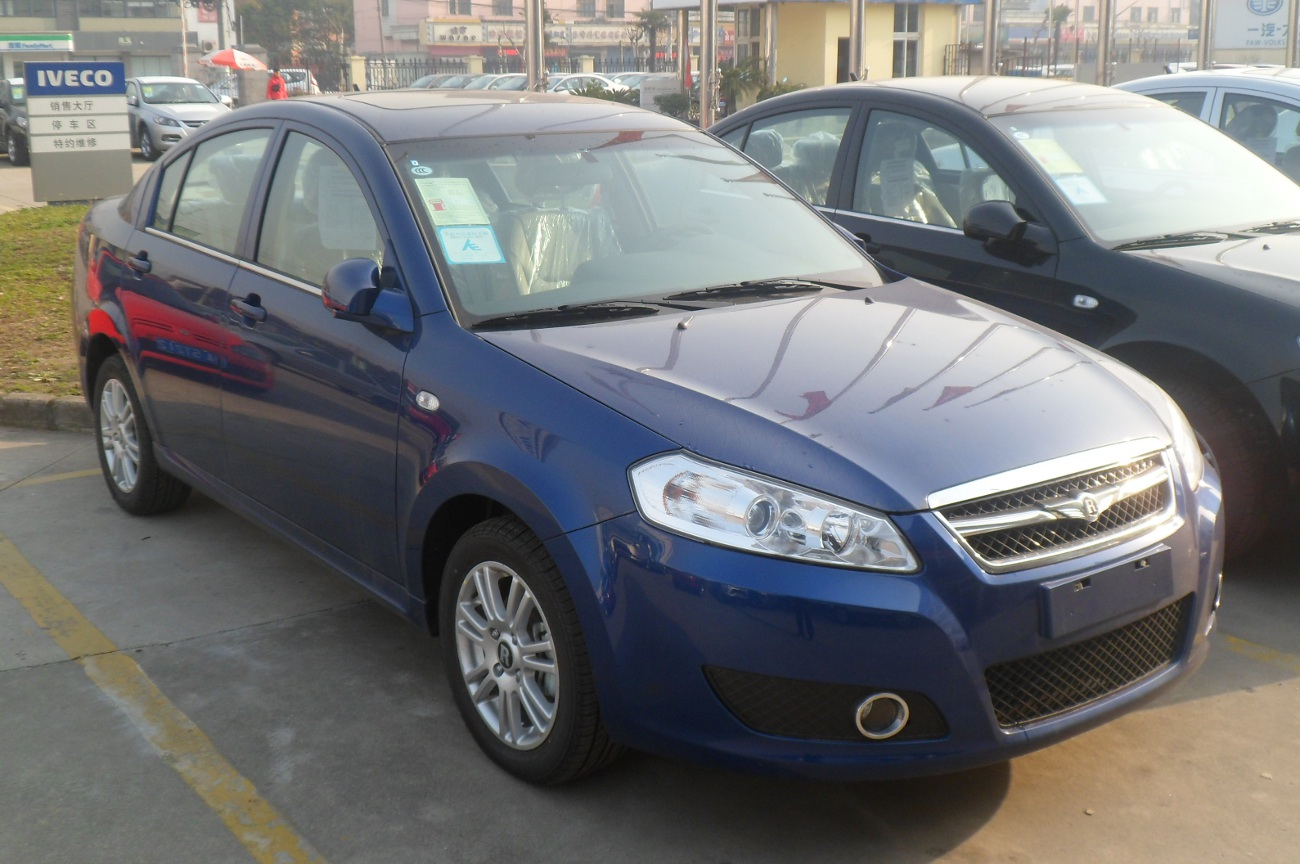
Riich G3 front

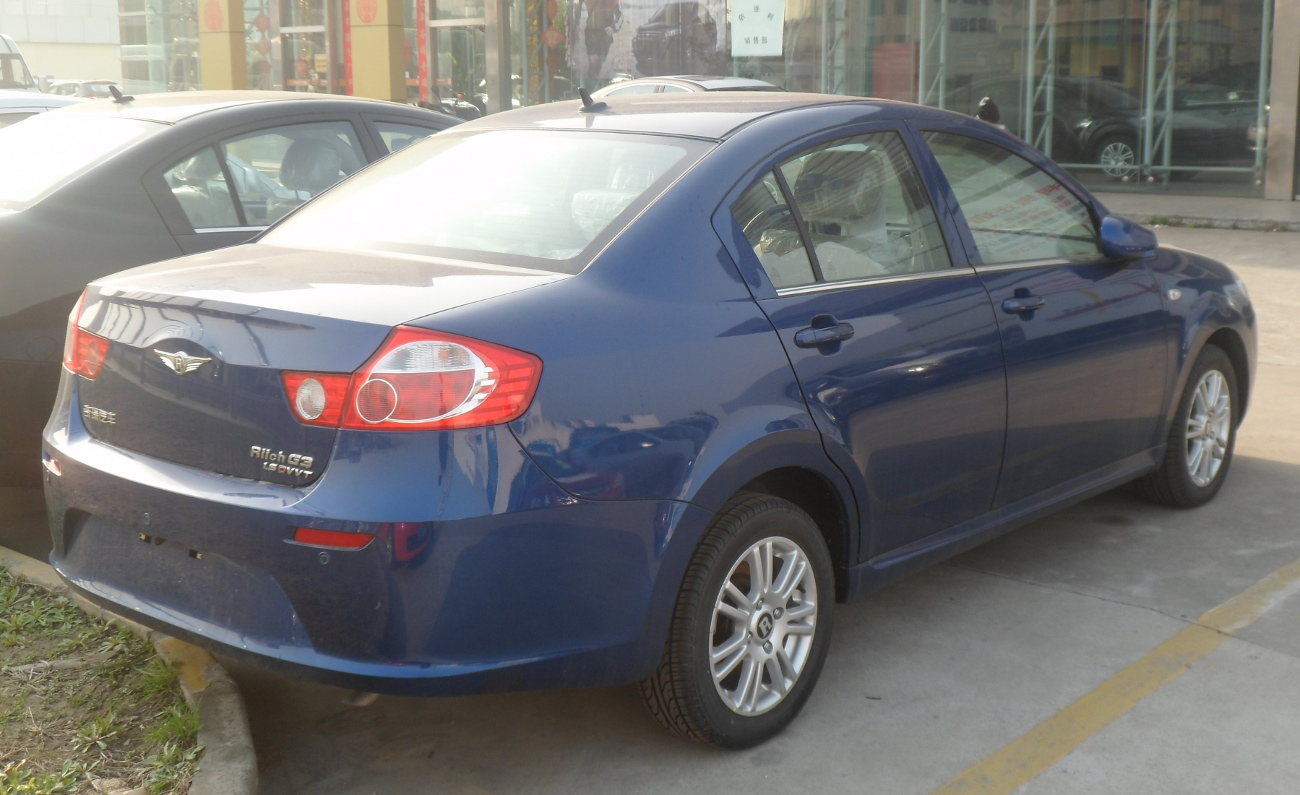
Riich G3 rear
