= Riich G6 =

Chinese full-size car

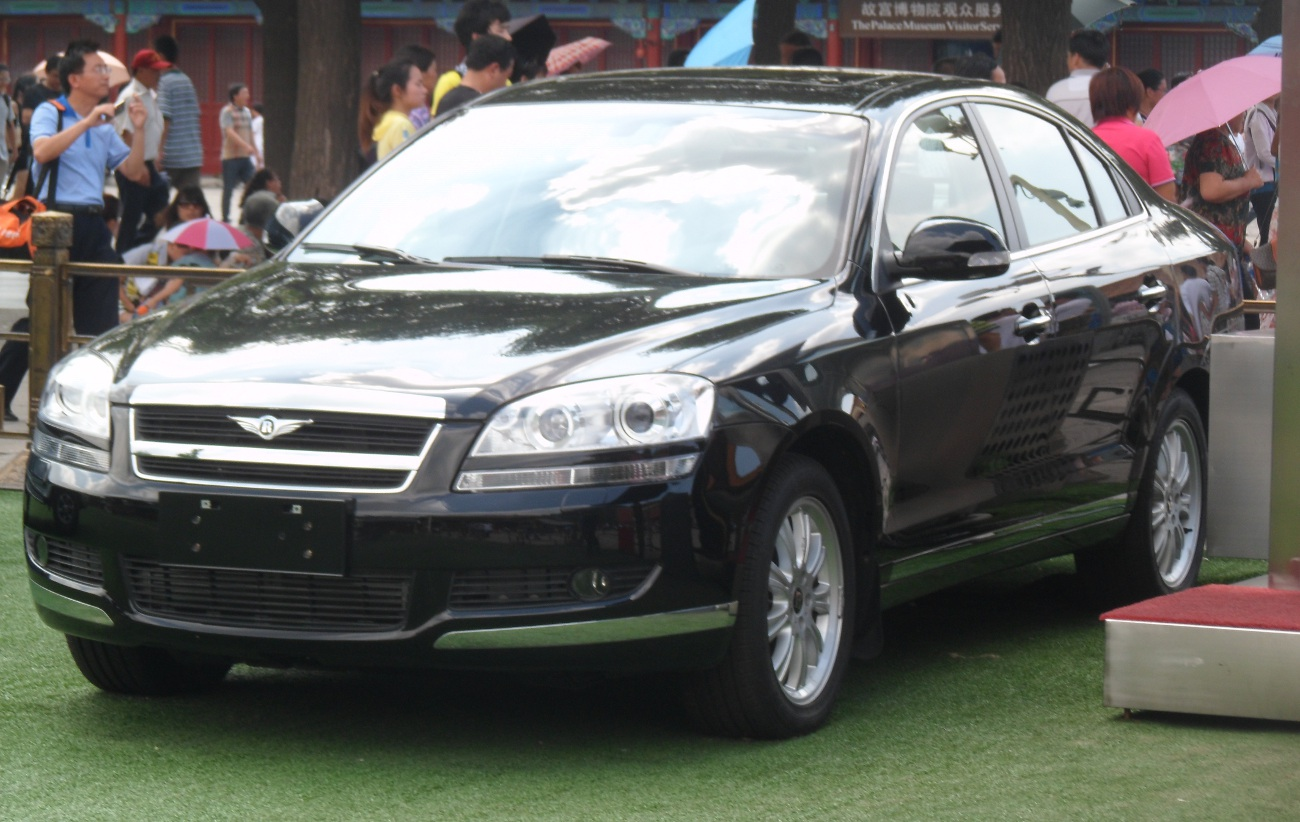

Overview
- Manufacturer: Riich (Chery)
- Also called: Chery G6
- Production: 2010–2013
- Assembly: Wuhu, Anhui, China
- Designer: Giuliano Biasio at Bertone

Body and chassis
- Class: Full-size car
- Body style: 4-door sedan
- Layout: Front-engine, front-wheel-drive

Powertrain
- Engine: 2.0 L SQR484B I4turbo (petrol); 3.0 L V6
- Transmission: 5-speed automatic

Dimensions
- Wheelbase: 2,820 mm (111.0 in)
- Length: 4,968 mm (195.6 in)
- Width: 1,845 mm (72.6 in)
- Height: 1,526 mm (60.1 in)
- Curb weight: 1,765 kg (3,891 lb)

The Riich G6 is a full-size car manufactured by the Riich division of the Chinese company Chery Automobile from 2010 to 2013 (code B12), with prices ranging from 189,800 yuan to 259,800 yuan.

== Features ==
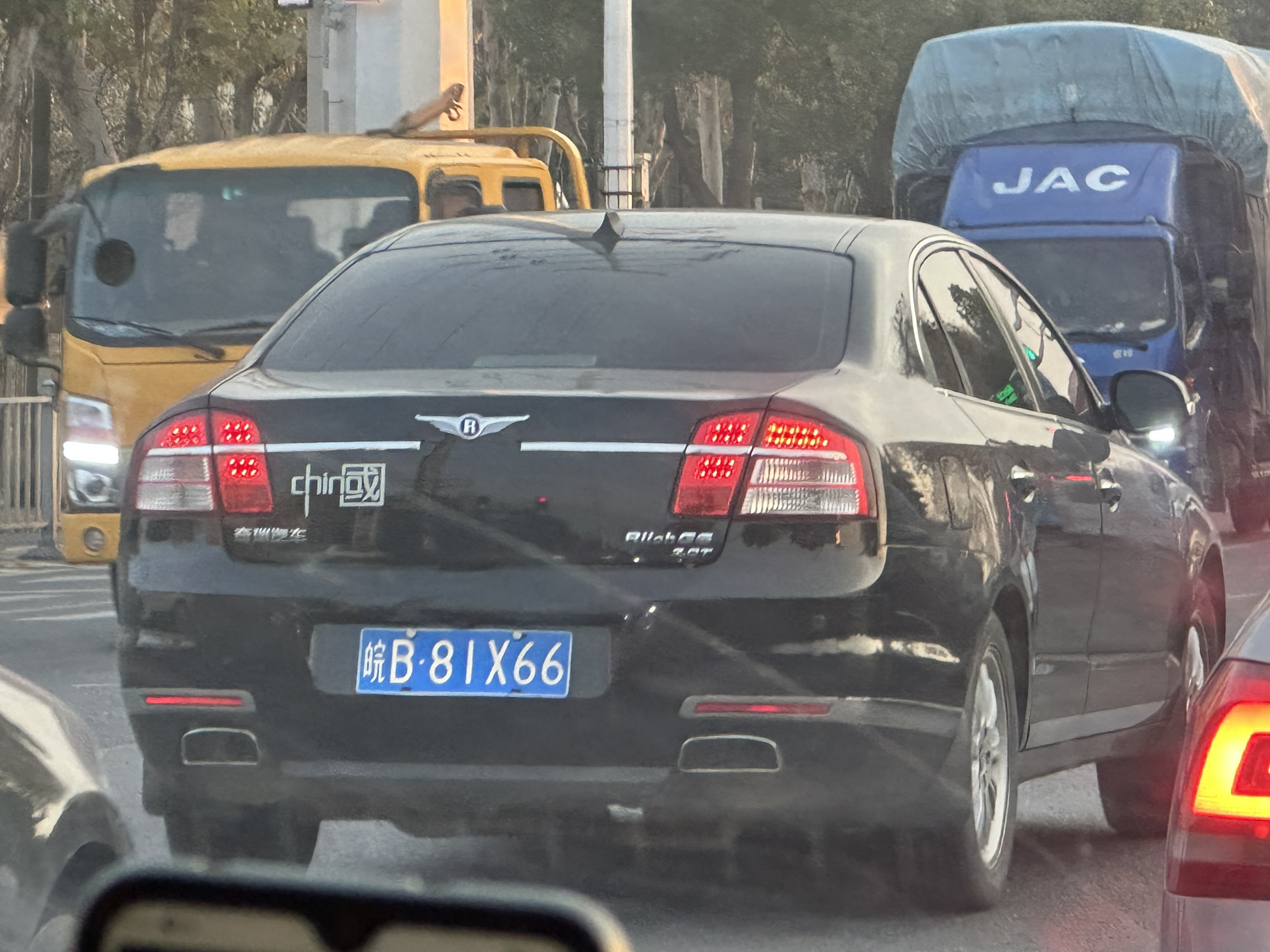
Riich G6 rear

Like the Riich G5, the car was designed by the Italian Bertone design firm and the 2.0T version is equipped with a 2.0-litre turbocharged petrol engine, delivering up to 168 hp (125 kW) at 5500 rpm, with a peak torque of 235 N⋅m (24 m⋅kgf; 173 lb⋅ft) at 1900 rpm.

== Riich G6 Paramount limousine ==
A limousine version called the Riich G6 Paramount limousine was unveiled during the 2011 Shanghai Auto Show. The limousine was based on the regular G6 and was stretched by more than two meters to a total length of 7.2 meters with room for seven occupants. Power comes from the standard 2.0L turbo with 158 hp.
