= Riich M1 =

Car manufactured by the Chinese manufacturer Chery

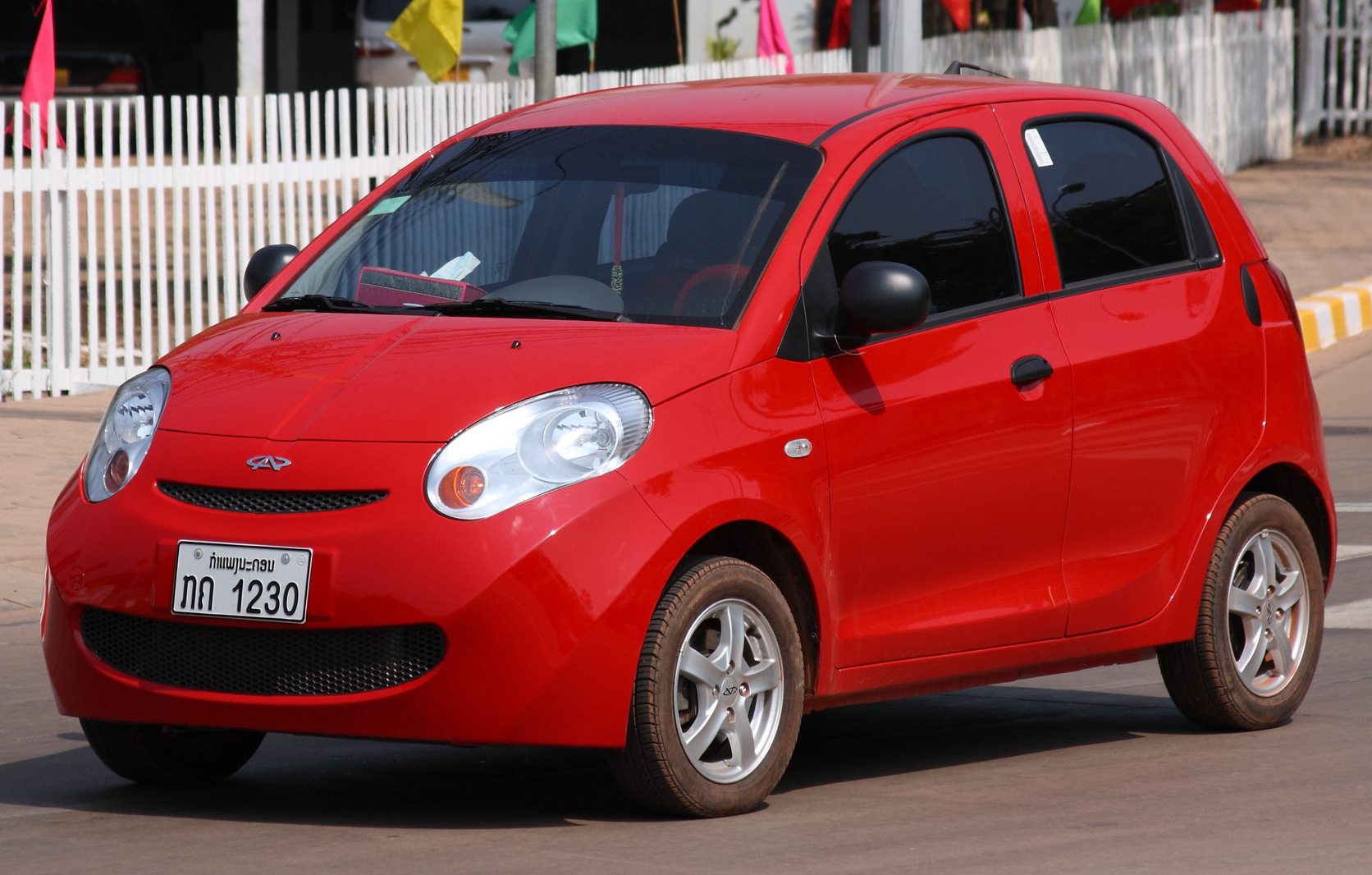

Overview
- Manufacturer: Riich (Chery)
- Also called: Chery M1; Chery S18; DR1 (Italy); Hawtai S1 iEV360; Riich M5 (notchback); Chery IndiS
- Production: 2009–2014; 2018–2023 (Hawtai)
- Assembly: Wuhu, Anhui, China; Macchia d'Isernia, Italy

Body and chassis
- Class: City car (A)
- Body style: 5-door hatchback (Riich M1); 5-door notchback (Riich M5); 5-door station wagon (Riich X1)
- Layout: Front-engine, front-wheel-drive
- Related: Chery QQ; Chery QQme; Chery QQ6

Powertrain
- Engine: 1.0L SQR472FB I4 petrol 1.1L SQR472F I4 petrol 1.3L SQR473 I4 petrol
- Transmission: 5-speed manual 5-speed automated manual 1-speed fixed gear ratio (EV)

Dimensions
- Wheelbase: 2,330 mm (91.7 in)
- Length: 3,620 mm (142.5 in); 3,905 mm (153.7 in) (notchback)
- Width: 1,630 mm (64.2 in)
- Height: 1,530 mm (60.2 in)
- Curb weight: 945–960 kg (2,083–2,116 lb)

The Riich M1 is a city car produced by the Chinese automaker Chery between 2009 and 2014 and sold under the marque Riich in China. The M1 was also known as the Chery M1 or Chery S18 in most of export market, and as a DR1 in Italy assembled via CKD by DR Motor in Macchia d'Isernia.

A notchback version, called Riich M5, was introduced in 2010, but production ended in 2014 due to poor sales.

In 2017, Chinese automobile maker Hawtai acquired the license from Chery to build the EV-based M1 and production restarted in 2018. The Hawtai model was called S1 iEV360.

== History ==
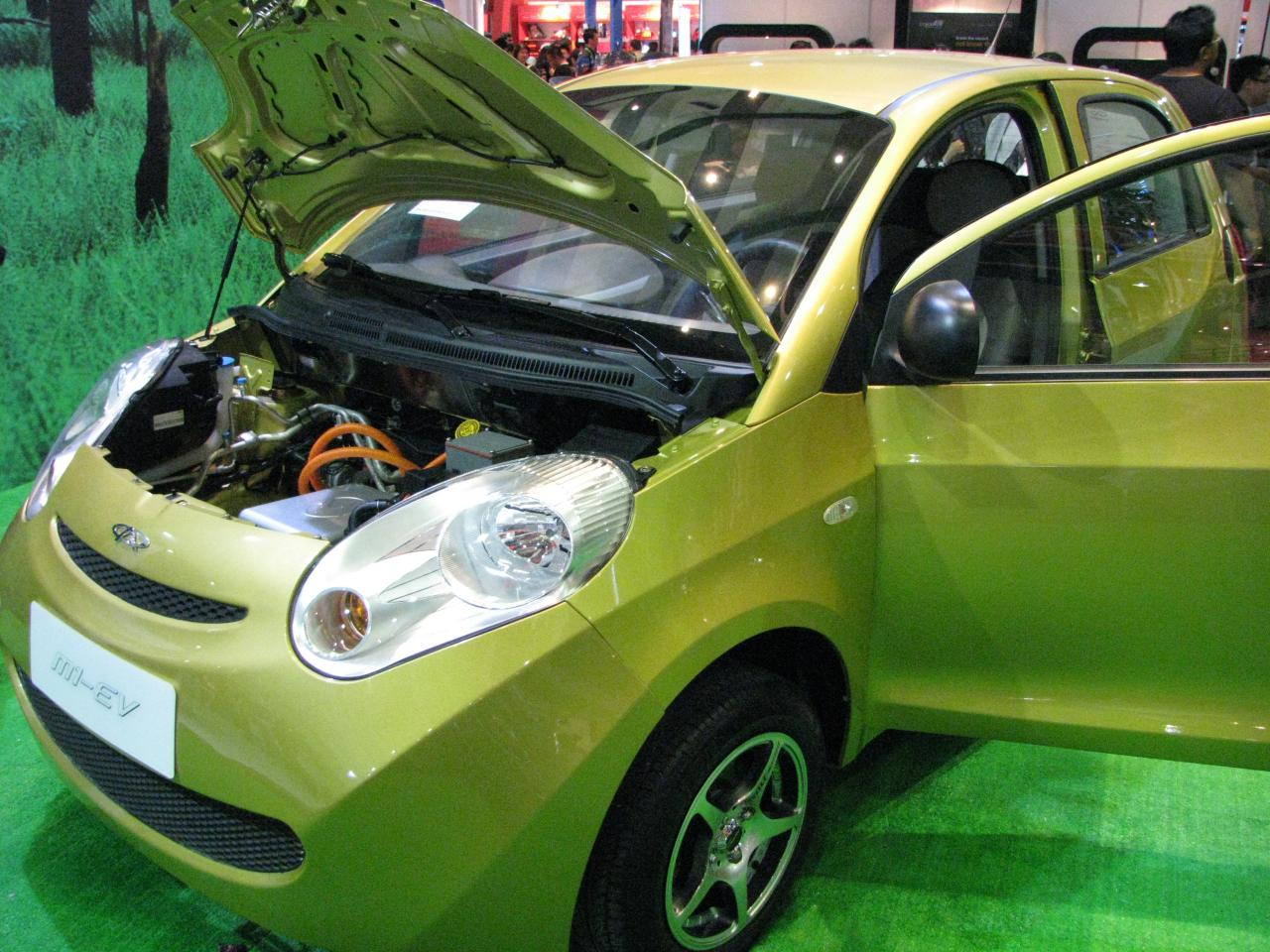
2010 Riich M1 EV

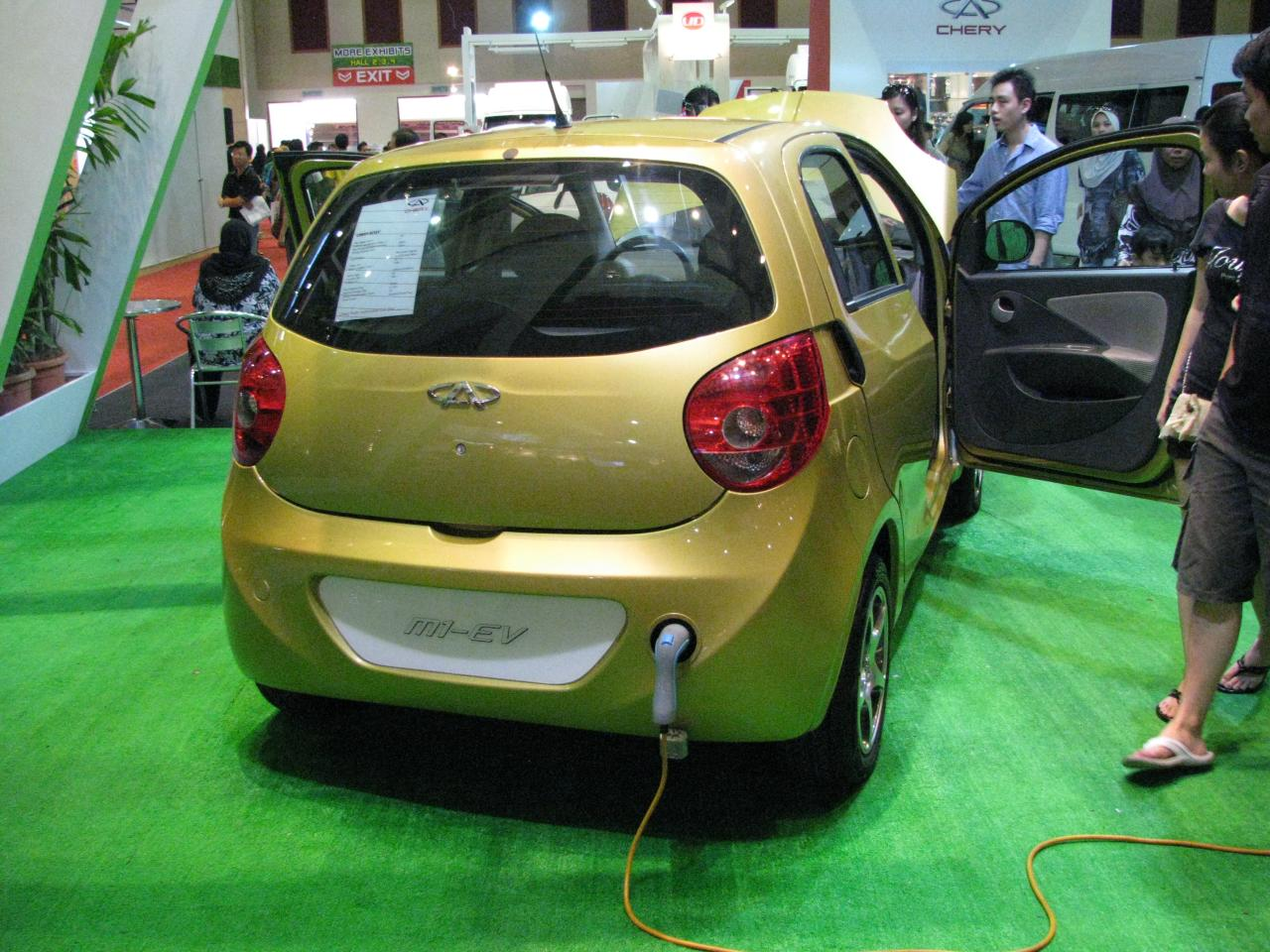
2010 Riich M1 EV rear

Developed on the same platform as the Chery QQ, the Riich M1 (Codeproject S18) was the smallest car marketed by Riich, the Chery division intended to sell better quality and better-finished cars than the rest of the parent company. In fact, the M1 was a totally new project compared to the old QQ that was still produced and updated several times. Launched the 16 August 2009 in China, the M1 has a five-door body with an MPV-like design. With a length of 3.60 meters the car was designed especially for export, in fact, it will be assembled under license in Italy by DR Motor going to be in direct competition with the European A-segment cars like the Fiat Panda, Citroën C1, Peugeot 107 and Hyundai i10. At launch the car was equipped with two four-cylinder petrol engines from the Acteco family developed by Chery and AVL. The 1.0 16V and 1.3 16V. The gearbox was a five-speed manual, or optional 5-speed automated manual on the 1.3. The interior was characterized by central instrumentation. Subsequently, the 1.0 engine was replaced by the new 1.1 16V Acteco. In November 2010, the electric version with an engine delivering 40 kW (54 hp; 54 PS) and a total range of between 120 and 150 kilometres (75 and 93 mi) came into production.

=== Riich X1 (crossover version) ===
An estate version with crossover cues called the Riich X1 was also available featuring a wagon body and black plastic cladding.

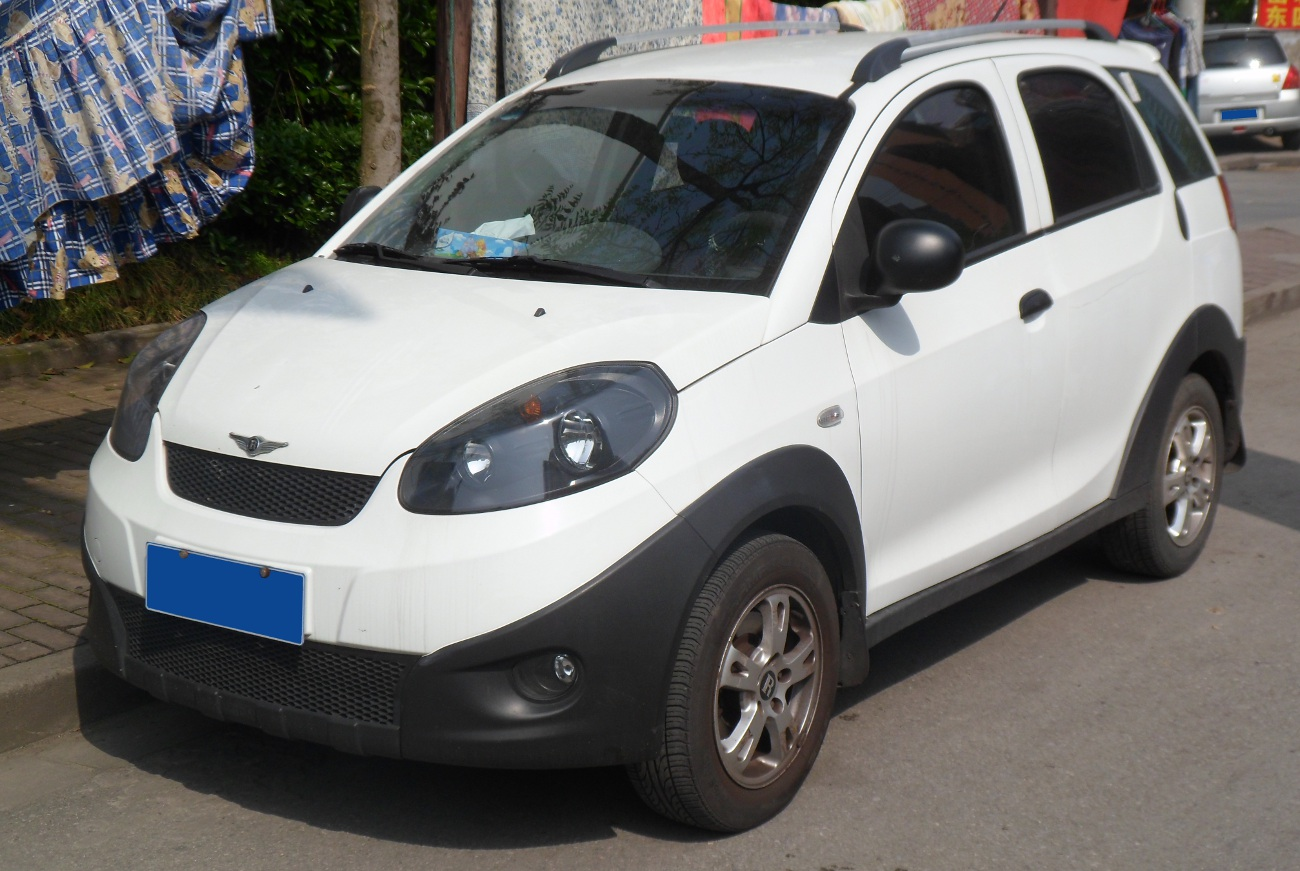
Riich X1 front

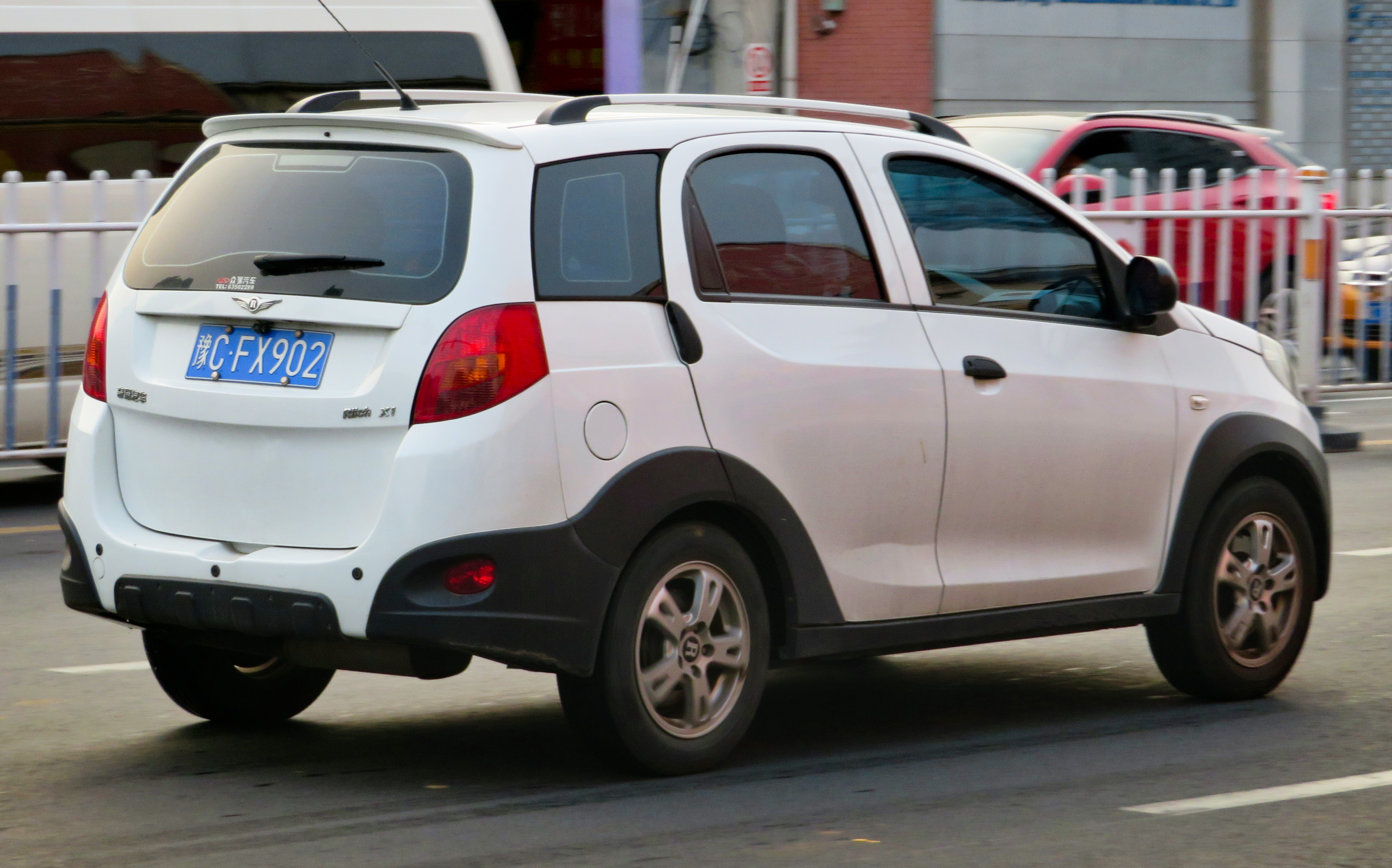
Riich X1 rear

=== Riich M5 (notchback version) ===
In 2010, a notchback-sedan version called Riich M5 (Codeproject S18C) was presented, characterized by the rear volume but with 5-door. The bodywork is extended by 30 cm, the third volume guarantees a much bigger boot. The M5 is a total of 3.905 m (153.7 in) length and is powered by the only 1.3-litr 16-valve petrol engine with manual or automatic transmission. Compared to the M1, there is no difference in the interior, also the front and the doors are kept. Production of the M5 ends in 2014, due to poor sales.

== Oversea markets ==
In most Asian and Latin American markets, the M1 was exported from Chery to be sold under its own brand, being the Riich division specific to China. In 2013, the Riich brand closed and some vehicles continued to be sold under the Chery brand; the M1 then became Chery M1. Production ended in 2014 due to low sales.

In Russia, the mode is sold as the Chery IndiS.

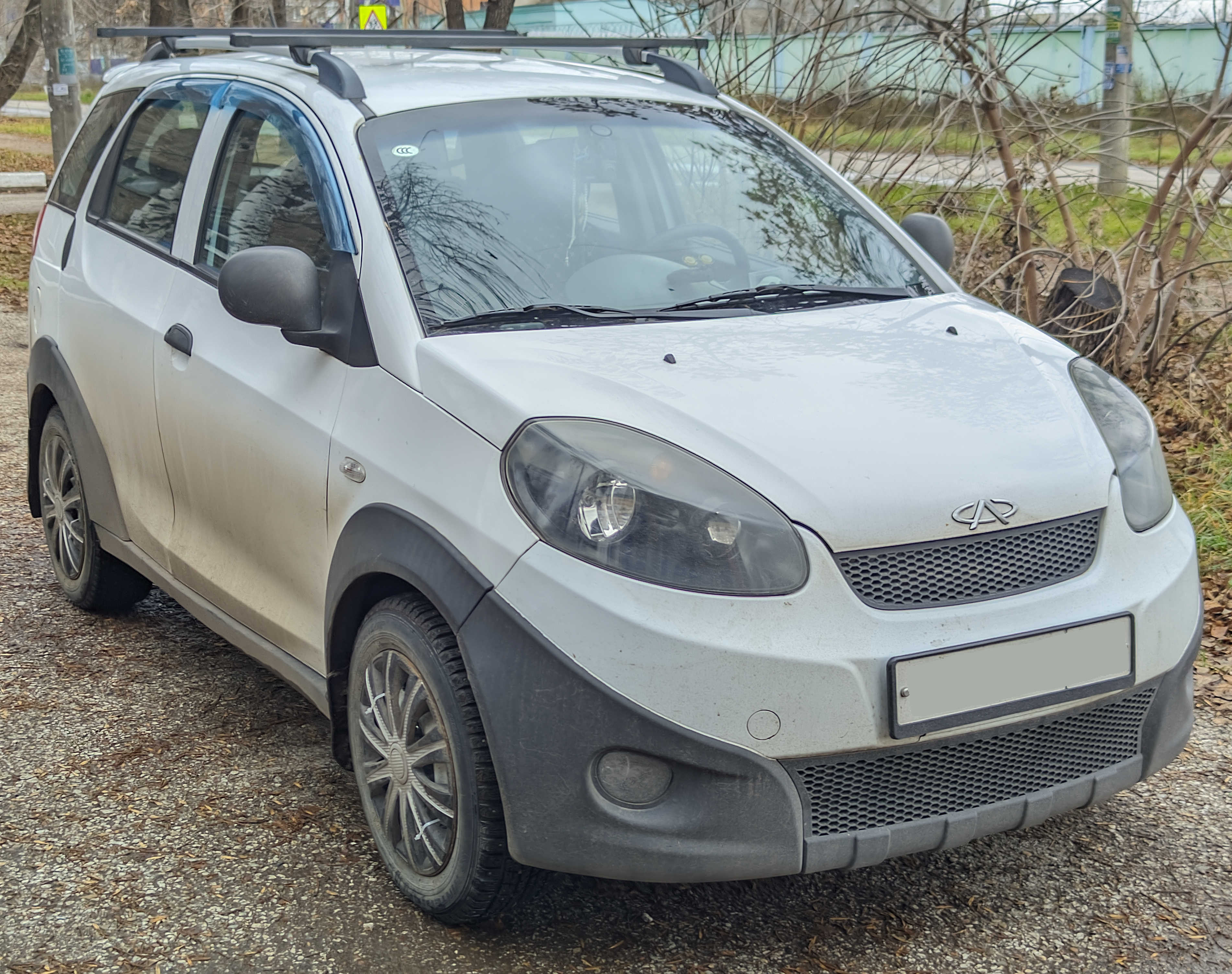
2014 Chery IndiS

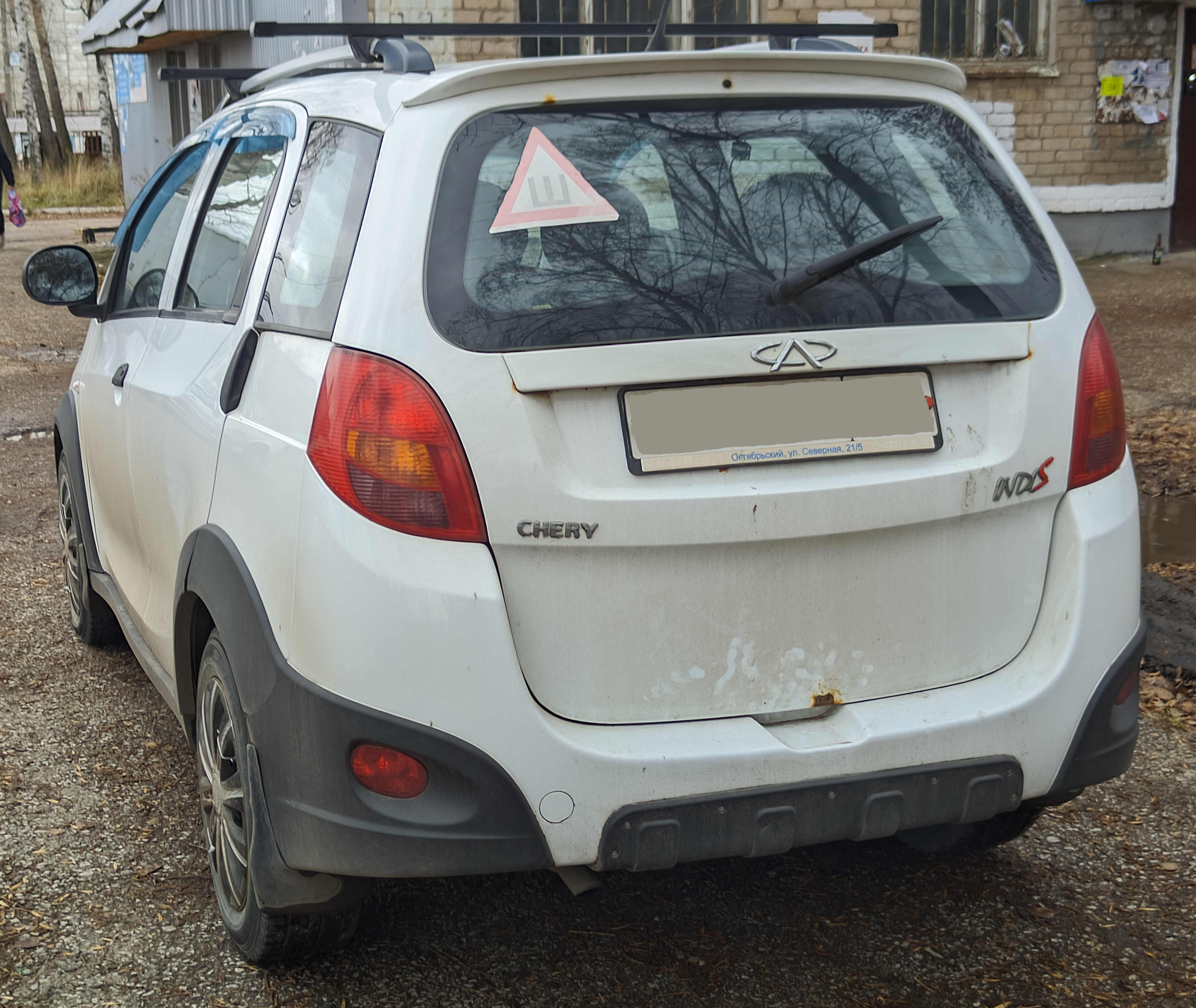
Rear

== License built version ==
=== DR1 (2009–2014) ===
The M1 was produced in CKD by DR Motor in Italy at the Macchia d'Isernia plant and renamed DR1. Production starts at the end of 2009 with a presentation at the Bologna Motor Show 2009 and compared to the Chinese version the DR1 presents a new redesigned bumper with a rectangular grille and better-finished interiors, moreover, all the safety devices have been re-homologated according to Europe standards. Also, the structure had been revised to better fit the European driving, moreover, the body had been reinforced for the homologation in the crash tests. Initially, it was proposed with the same 1.3 16V of the Chinese Riich M1. In 2011 the 1.1 16V was added. All the engines were also available with a dual-power supply with LPG system. Initially in Italy it was quite successful, however, sales later fell and production stopped in 2014. In Italy, a special version called DR1 Ambassador was also sold with enriched equipment and logos with the Italian flag applied on the side. The electric version (equal to the Riich M1 EV) had been exhibited at the Bologna Motor Show 2010 but has never entered production due to the low demand for electric vehicles in Italy. It has been replaced by DR Zero (rebadge of the second generation Chery QQ)

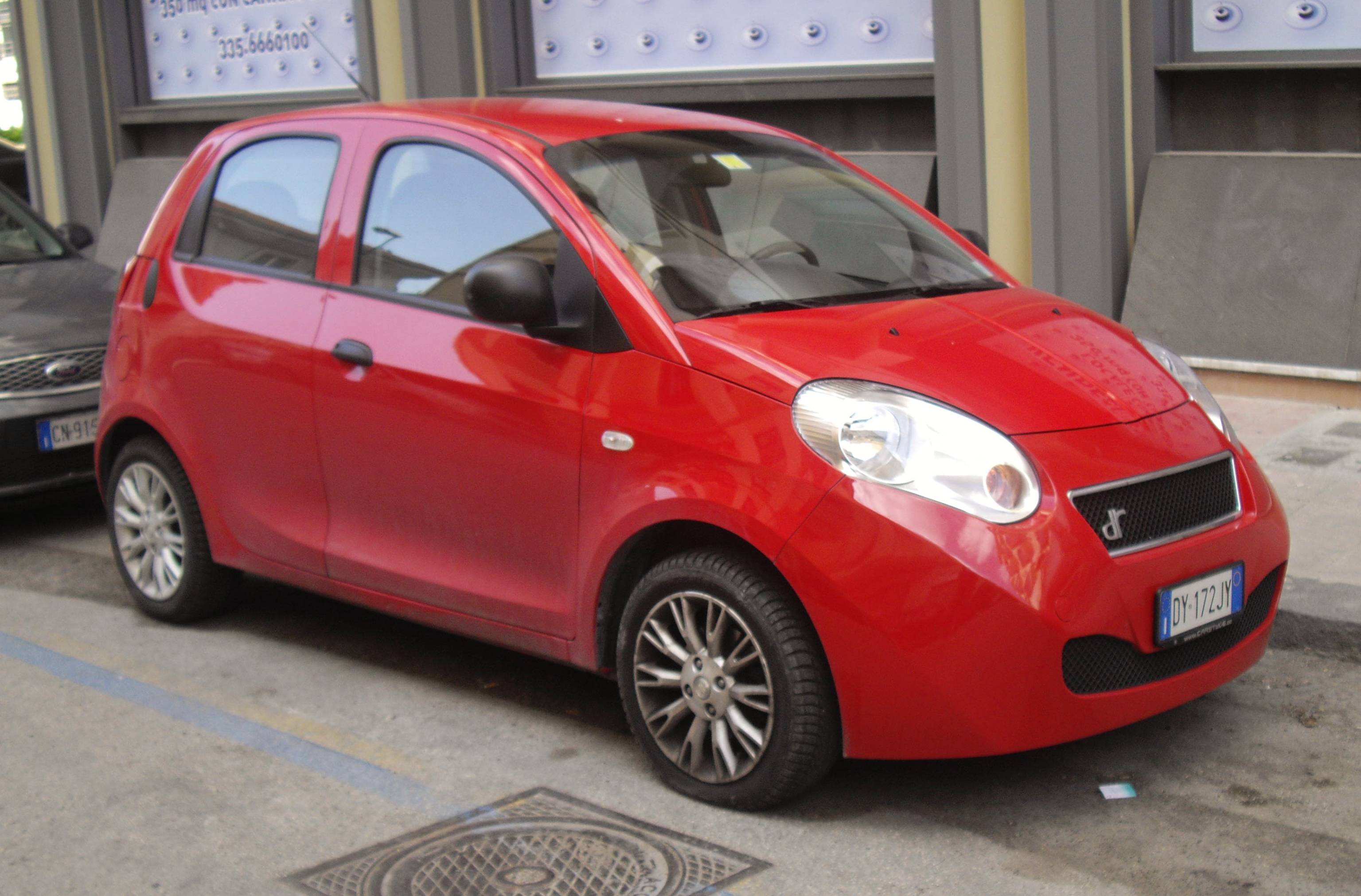
DR1 in Italy

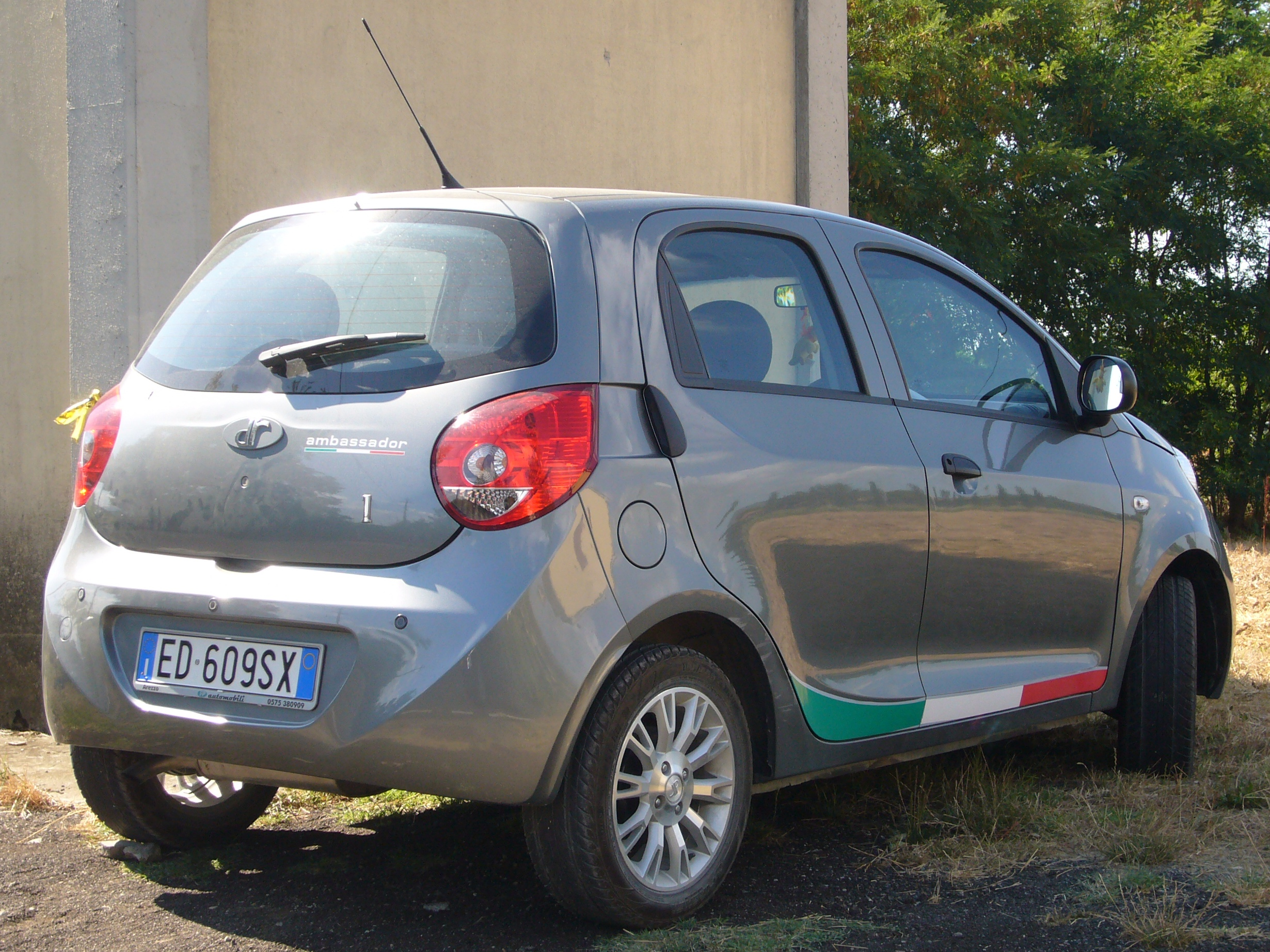
DR1 in Italy (rear quarter)

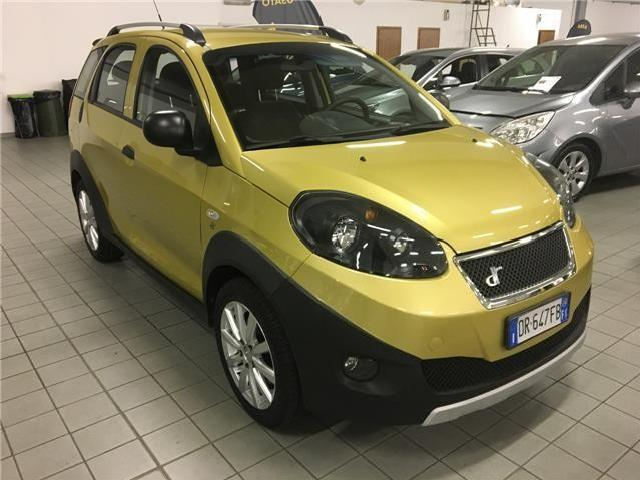
DR CityCross/CityVan

=== Hawtai S1 iEV360 and Shendafei 2 XEV 360 (2018–2023) ===
In 2017, Hawtai Motor Group acquired the license for production of the EV version from Chery and in 2018 began assembly with the presentation at the Beijing Auto Show of the Hawtai version rebadged S1 iEV360. The car, compared to the original electric M1, has been re-engineered by adopting a new electric motor (with 58 horsepower) and new batteries that guarantee a range of about 225 kilometres (140 mi) in the homologation in the NEDC cycle. The Hawtai version is sold only in China. After Hawtai's acquisition of the production license from Chery in 2017, the crossover variant was rebadged to Shendafei 2 XEV 360.
