= Chery A5 =

Compact sedan

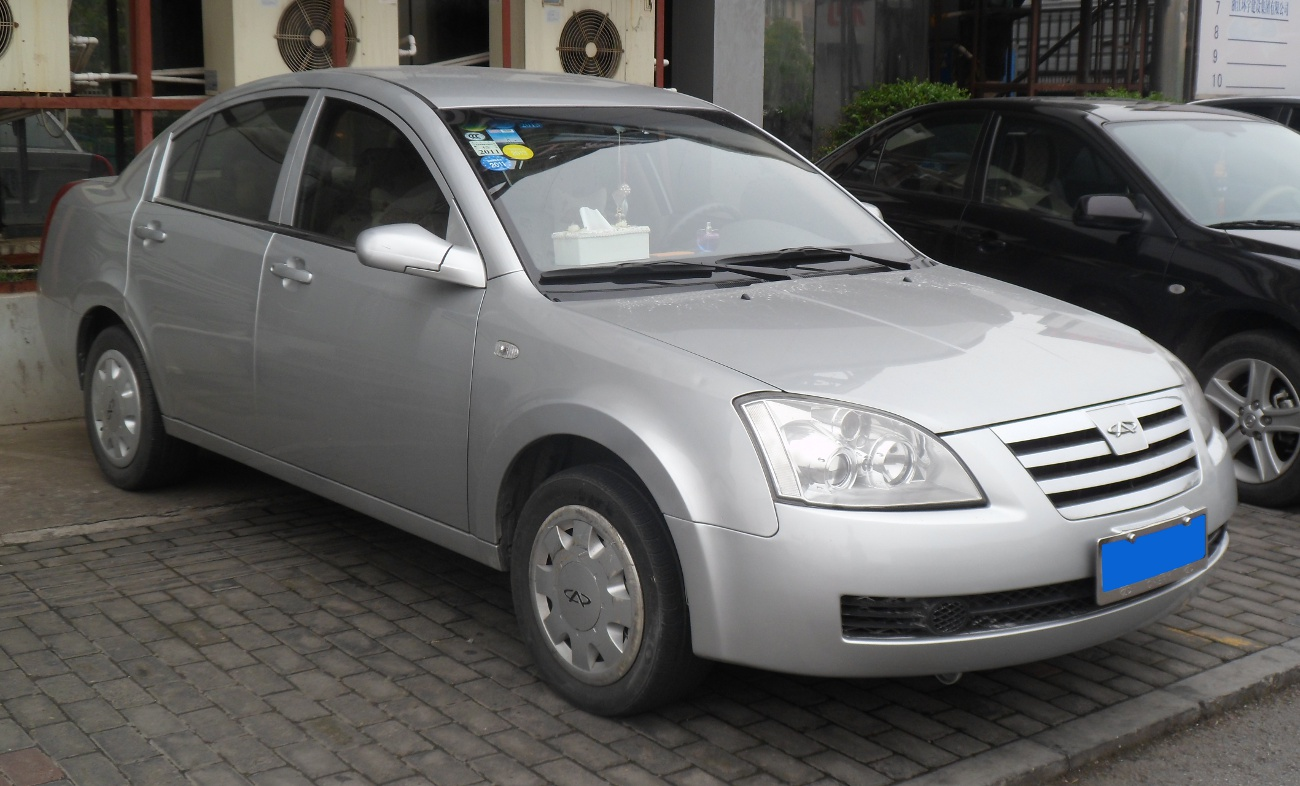

Overview
- Manufacturer: Chery
- Also called: Chery Cowin 3 (facelift); Chery Alia (Turkey); Chery Elara (Ukraine); Chery Fora (Russia, pre facelift); Chery J5 (Singapore, South Africa); Speranza A516 (Egypt); MVM 530 (Iran); Vortex Estina (Russia, facelift model, rebadged)
- Production: 2006–2010
- Assembly: Wuhu, Anhui, China; Cairo, Egypt (Speranza); Bam, Kerman, Iran (MVM); Zaporizhia, Ukraine (ZAZ); Taganrog, Russia (TagAZ); Kaliningrad, Russia (Avtotor, 2006 to 2008)

Body and chassis
- Class: Compact car
- Body style: 4-door sedan
- Layout: Front-engine, front-wheel-drive
- Related: Daewoo Lacetti

Powertrain
- Engine: 1.6 L SQR477F I4 (petrol); 1.8 L SQR481FC I4 (petrol); 2.0 L SQR484F I4 (petrol)
- Transmission: 5-speed manual 4-speed automatic

Dimensions
- Wheelbase: 2,600 mm (102.4 in)
- Length: 4,552 mm (179.2 in)
- Width: 1,750 mm (68.9 in)
- Height: 1,483 mm (58.4 in)
- Curb weight: 1,290 kg (2,844 lb)

Chronology
- Successor: Chery E5

The Chery A5 is a compact sedan produced by the Chinese manufacturer Chery from 2006 to 2010, based on General Motors J platform and facelift of Daewoo Lacetti. This car heavily resembles the Nissan Altima and Maxima, despite being unrelated. A facelifted variant of the A5 called the Cowin 3 was produced from 2010 to 2013.

== Specifications ==
The car is available with three engine options: a 1.6-litre engine, a 1.8-litre engine or a 2.0-litre engine. A hybrid version, named Chery A5ISG or A5BSG, is also produced. It is considered to be the first Chinese-designed mass-production hybrid vehicle. It is equipped with safety features such as ABS, EBD and ESP.

=== Powertrain ===
All engines are ACTECO engines, designed in cooperation with the AVL engineering company, of Austria:

- 1.6 L (1,597 cc) maximum power: 87.5 kW (119 PS; 117 hp), maximum torque: 147 N⋅m (108 lb⋅ft), top speed: 180 km/h, fuel consumption at 90 km/h: 6.6 L/100 km (43 mpg_{‑imp}; 36 mpg_{‑US})
- 1.8 L (1,845 cc) maximum power: 97 kW (132 PS; 130 hp), maximum torque: 170 N⋅m (125 lb⋅ft), top speed: 185 km/h, fuel consumption at 90 km/h: 6.8 L/100 km (42 mpg_{‑imp}; 35 mpg_{‑US})
- 2.0 L (1,971 cc) maximum power: 102 kW (139 PS; 137 hp), maximum torque: 182 N⋅m (134 lb⋅ft), top speed with manual transmission: 230 km/h, top speed with automatic transmission: 180 km/h, fuel consumption at 90 km/h: 7.2 L/100 km (39 mpg_{‑imp}; 33 mpg_{‑US})

=== Gallery ===
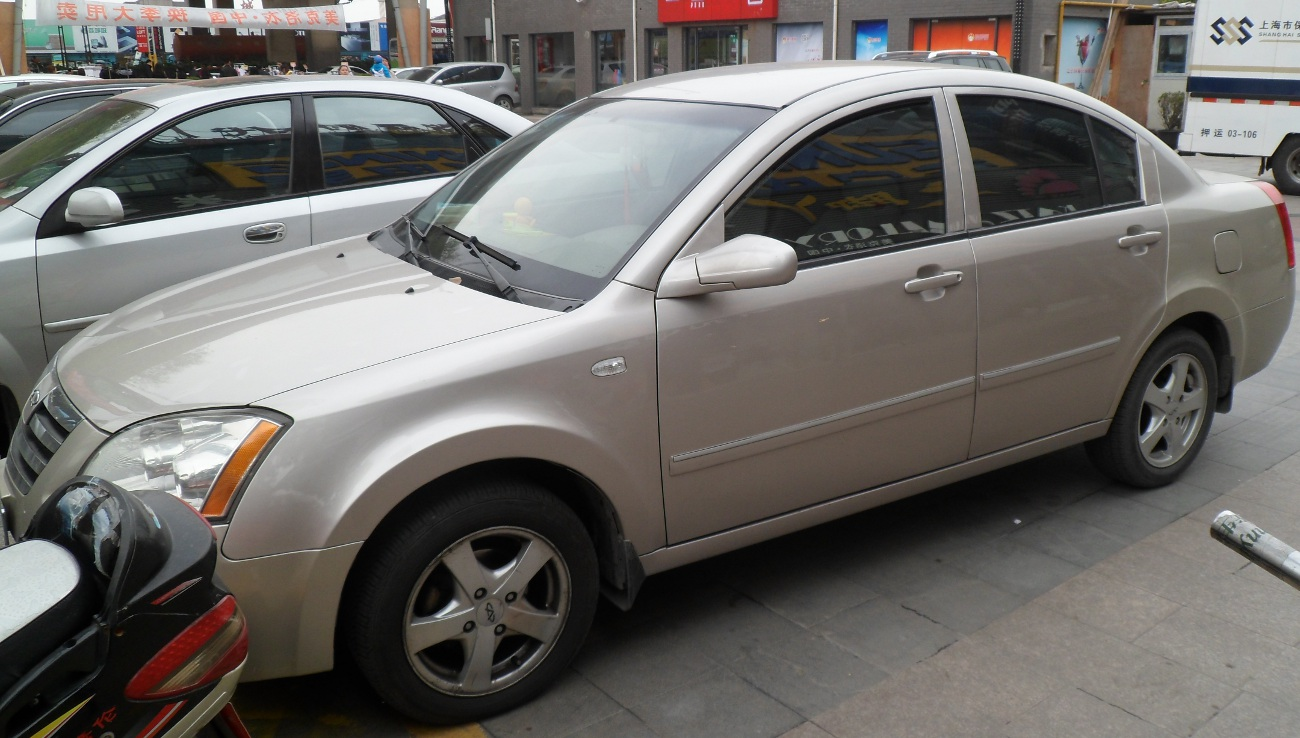
Chery A5 in China

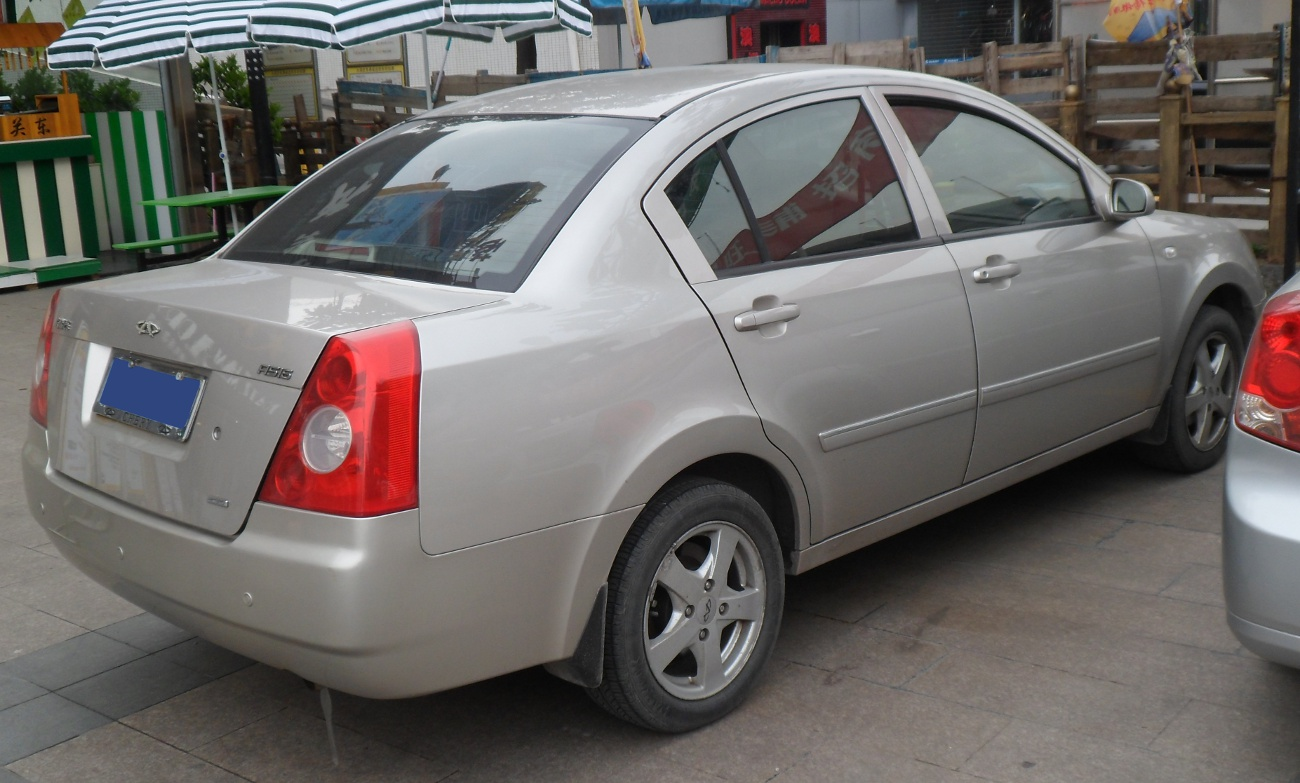
Chery A5 in China rear

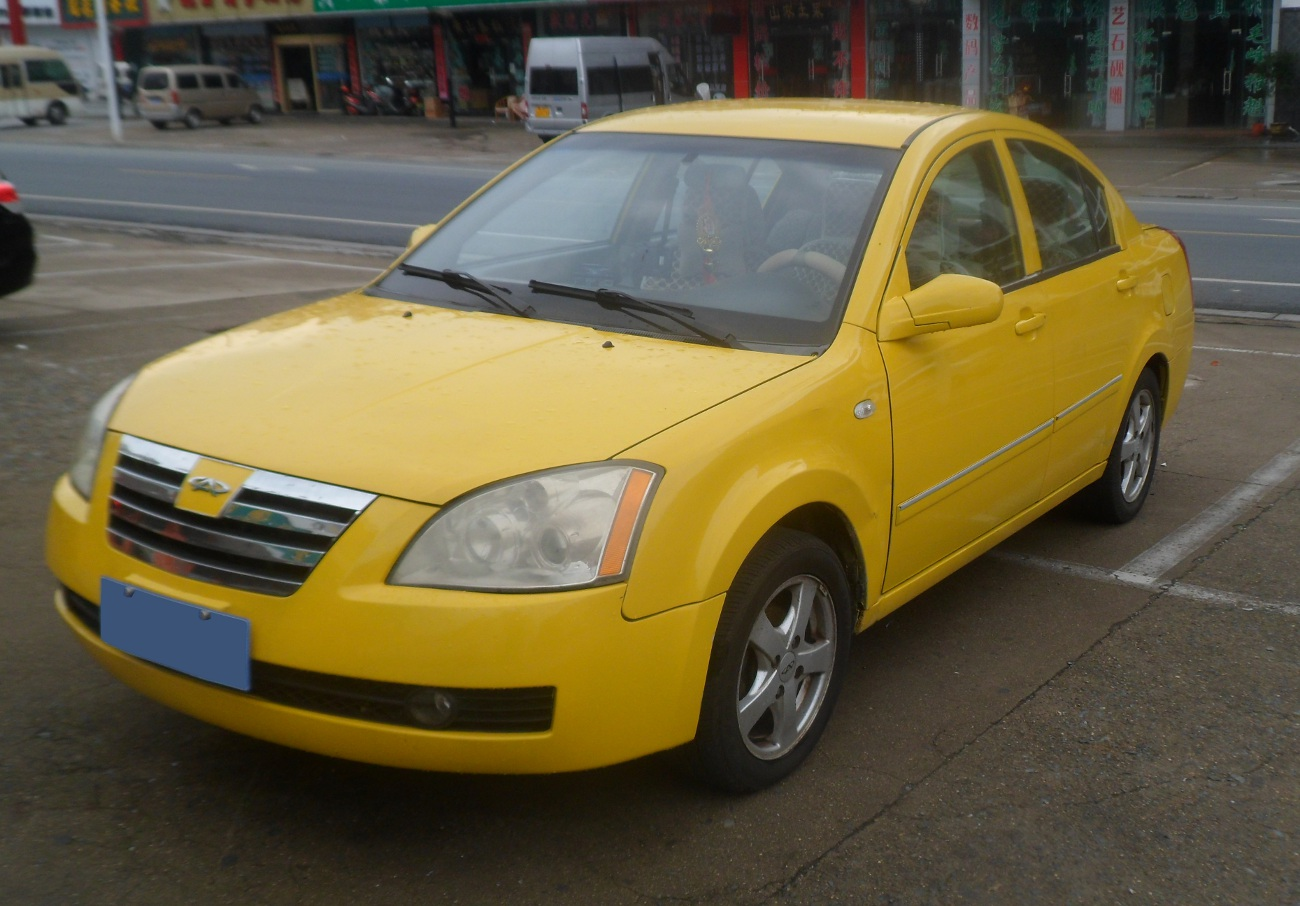
A rare yellow Chery A5

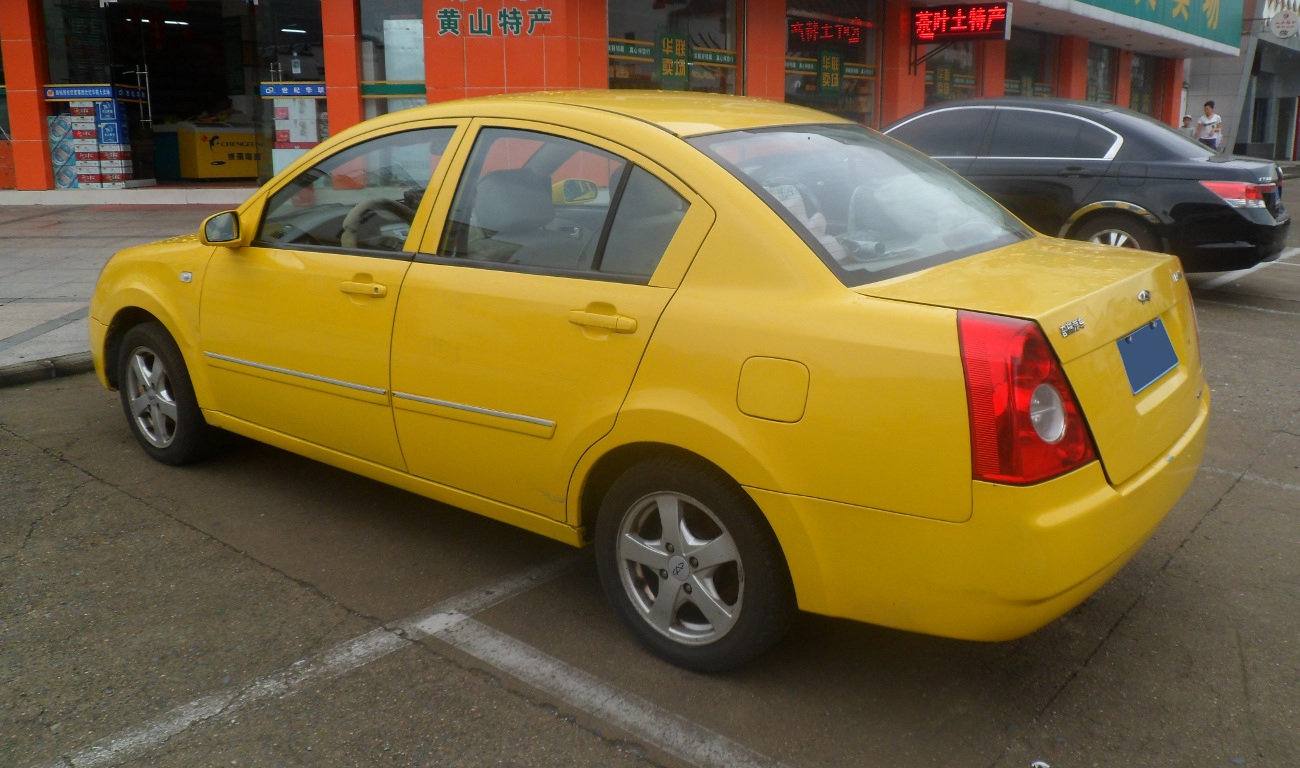
A rare yellow Chery A5 rear view

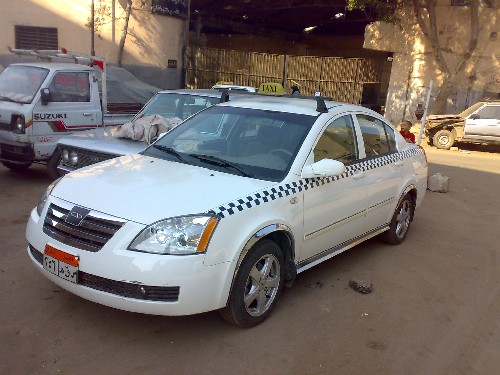
Chery A5 as Cairo taxi

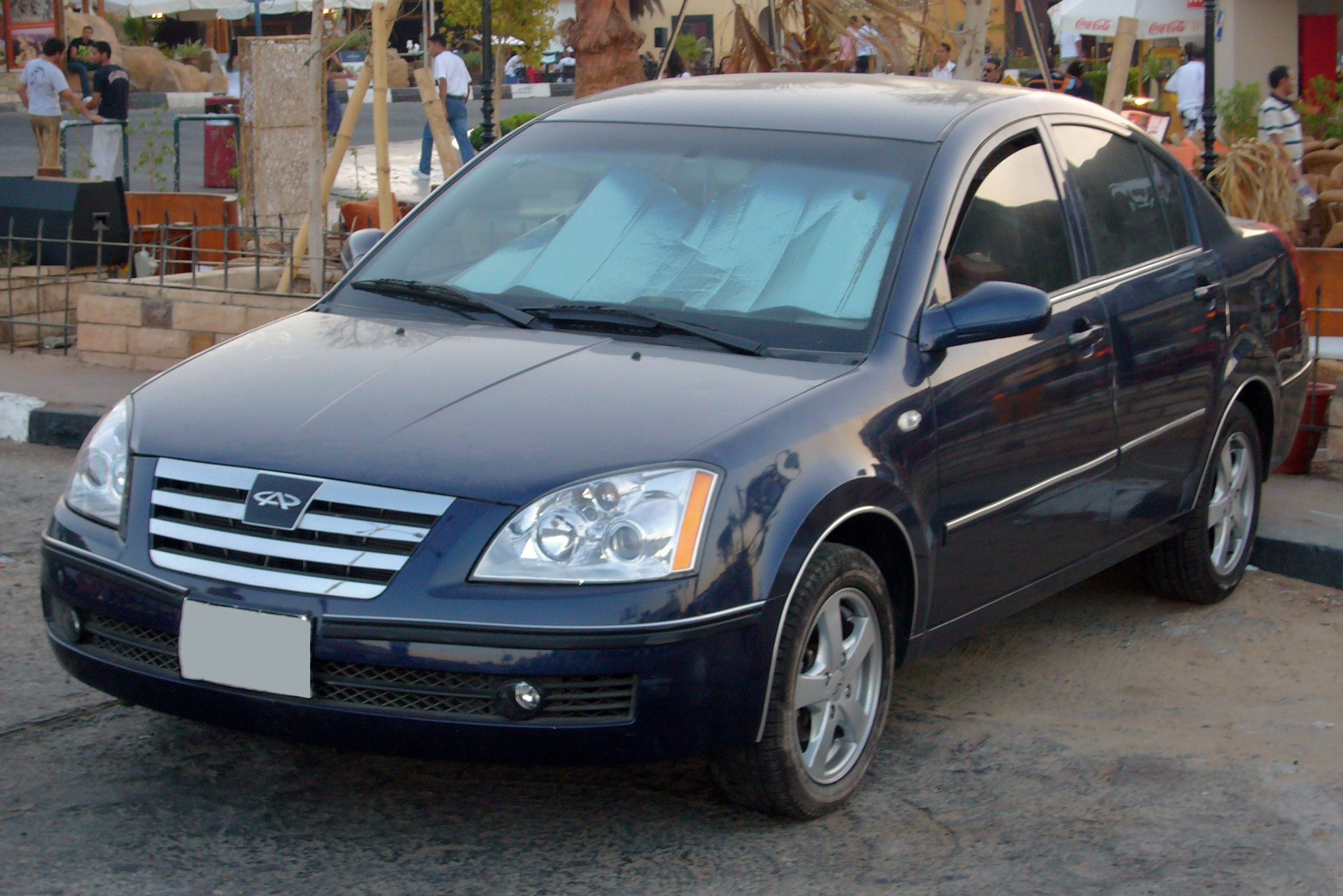
Chery A5 in Egypt

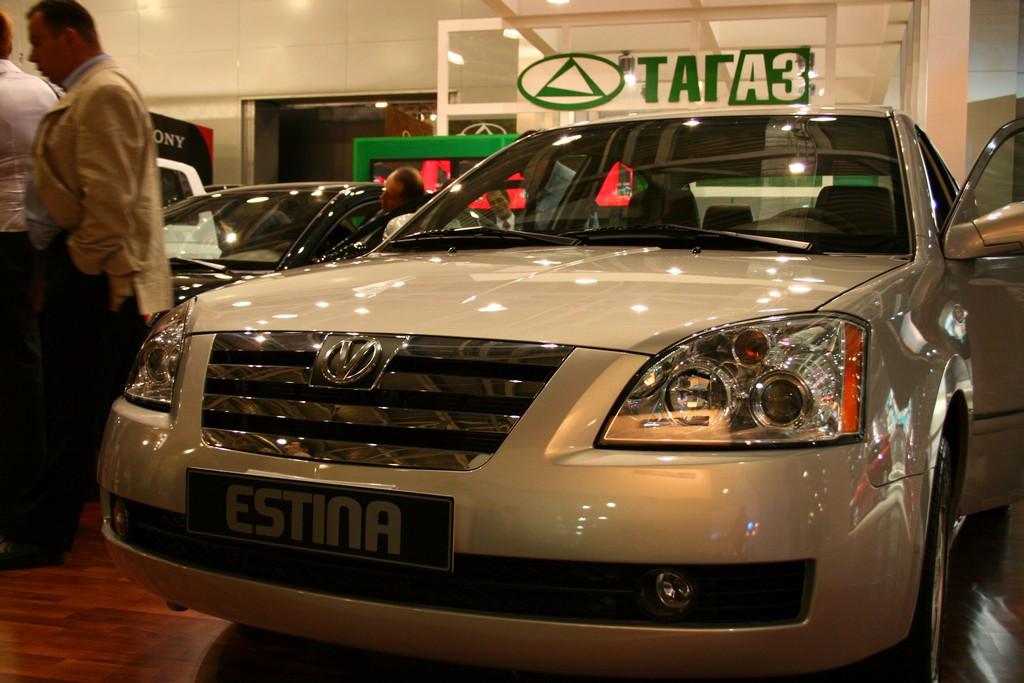
Chery A5 aka Vortex Estina in Russia

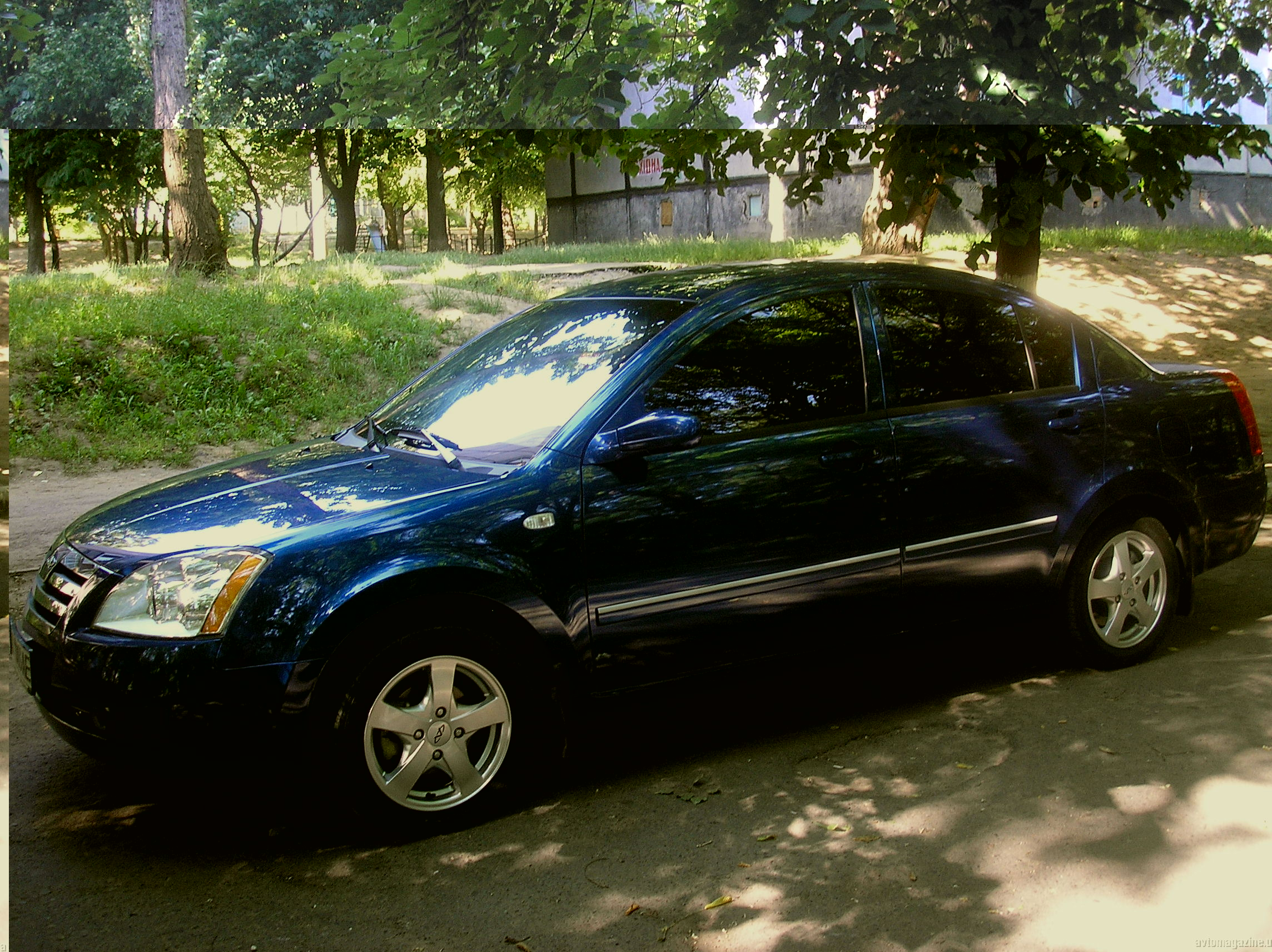
Chery Elara

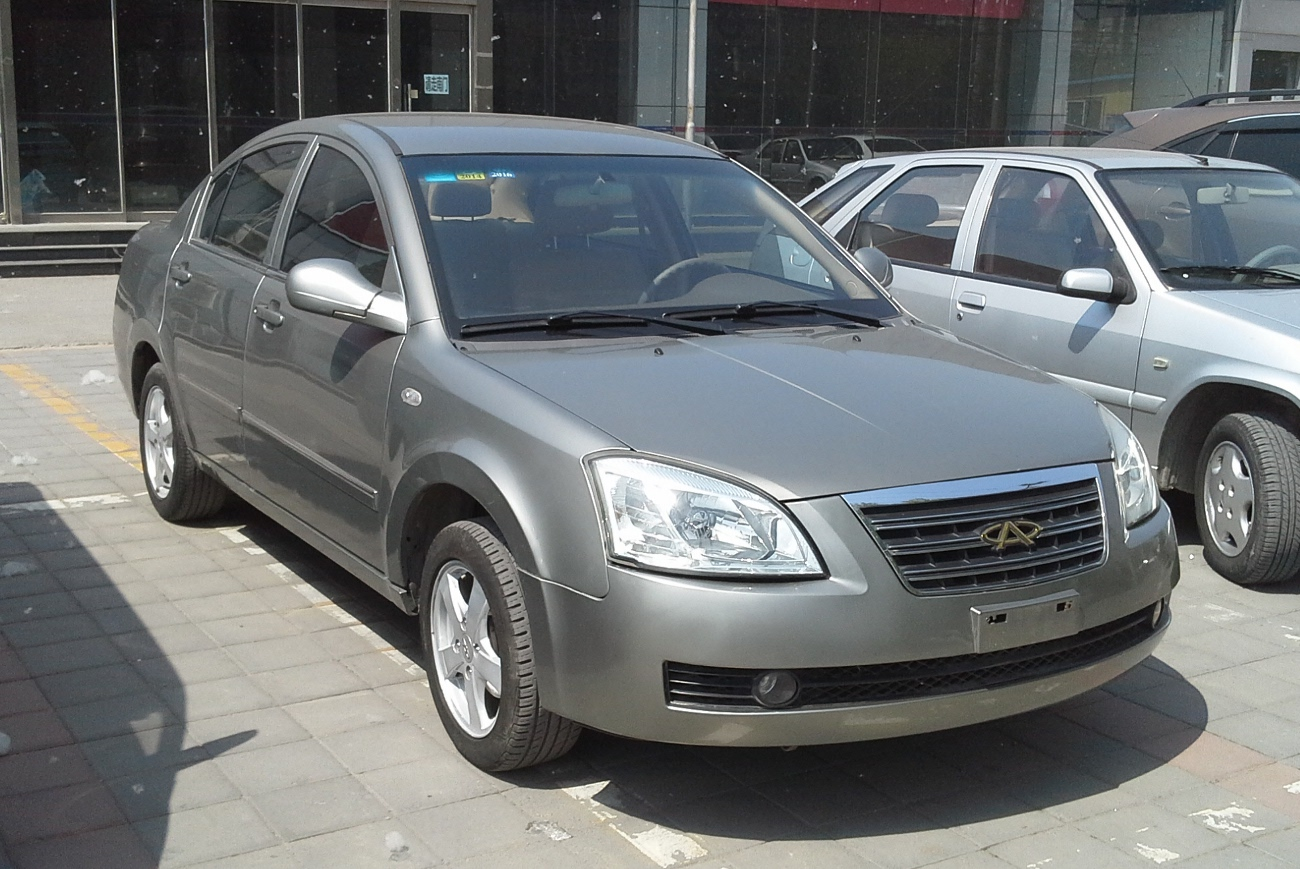
Chery Cowin 3 front
