= Riich G5 =

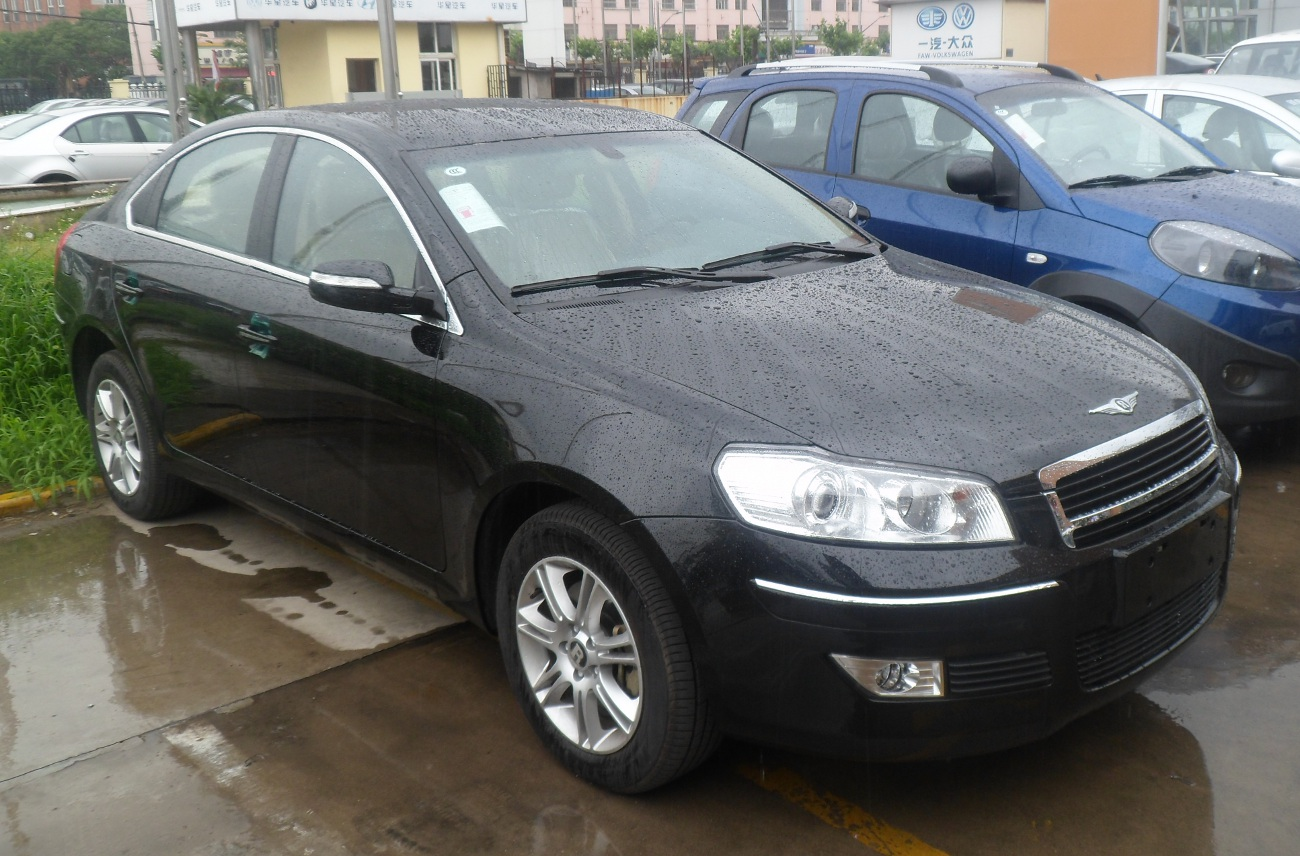

Overview
- Manufacturer: Riich (Chery)
- Also called: Chery G5
- Production: 2009–2013
- Assembly: Wuhu, Anhui, China
- Designer: Giuliano Biasio at Bertone

Body and chassis
- Class: Mid-size car
- Body style: 4-door sedan
- Layout: Front-engine, front-wheel-drive

Powertrain
- Engine: 2.0 L SQR484B I4 turbo (petrol)
- Transmission: 6-speed manual 5-Speed automatic

Dimensions
- Wheelbase: 2,700 mm (106.3 in)
- Length: 4,717 mm (185.7 in)
- Width: 1,794 mm (70.6 in)
- Height: 1,473 mm (58.0 in)
- Curb weight: 1,598 kg (3,523 lb)

The Riich G5 is a Mid-size car manufactured by the Riich division of the Chinese company Chery Automobile from 2009 to 2013. It was unveiled for the first time at the 2009 Shanghai Auto Show.

== Features ==
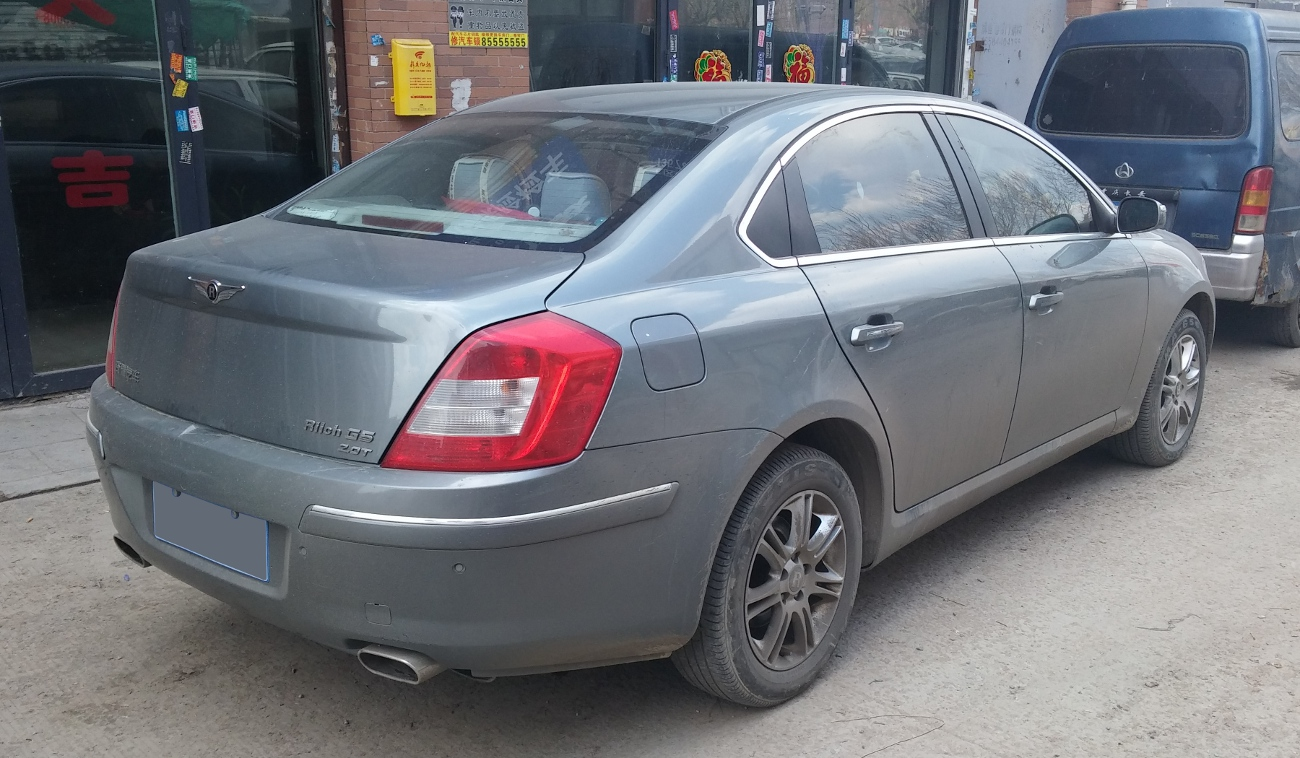
Riich G5 rear

The car was designed by the Italian Bertone company and is equipped with a 2.0-litre turbocharged petrol engine, delivering up to 168 hp (125 kW) at 5500 rpm, with a peak torque of 235 N⋅m (24 m⋅kgf) at 1900 rpm. The fuel consumption at the constant speed of 90 km/h (56 mph) is 6.5 L/100 km (43 mpg_{‑imp}; 36 mpg_{‑US}). The engine also features an intercooler and meets the Euro IV emission standards. It can reach a maximum speed of 210 km/h (130 mph) and can accelerate from 0 to 100 km/h (0 to 62 mph) in 10.9 seconds.

It offers front, side and curtain airbags, ABS, EBD, ESP, rear parking sensors, dual zone automatic air conditioning and a digital touchscreen display featuring navigation and DVD player functions. Other additional features are xenon headlights with headlight washers, tyre pressure monitoring system, electric-adjustable backrests, rear DVD screens and cruise control.
