= Riich =

Chinese Car marque of Chery

- Product type: Automotive
- Current owner: Chery Automobile
- Country: China
- Introduced: March 2009
- Discontinued: April 2013
- Markets: China
- Website: http://www.riichauto.com/
- Industry: Automobile
- Headquarters: Wuhu, Anhui

Riich (Chinese: 瑞麒; pinyin: Ruìqí) was an upmarket marque of the Chinese automaker Chery. Its models included a microvan, large sedans (the G5 and slightly bigger G6) and supermini Riich M series, including a five-door hatchback (M1), a small sedan (M5) and a five-door crossover (X1). The marque was launched in March 2009. The brand experienced poor sales and in September 2012. Due to that, Chery announced that it would be discontinued. Sales of Riich vehicles ended in April 2013.

Previously Chery used the "Riich" name for a model of van (the Chery Riich) prior to the creation of the Riich sub-brand.

== History ==
=== Beginnings and expansion ===
In the spring of 2009, Chery Automobile implemented a multi-brand strategy, expanding its portfolio with new branches aimed at improving the image of the Chinese corporation, which has so far been characterized by a budget nature. Together with Rely the Riich was also launched, which was a more expensive and luxurious alternative to regular Chery products. The range was first built on a family of three related city models, which was inaugurated by the Riich M1 hatchback. In addition, the M5 sedan and the X1 crossover debuted. Based on the M1, one of the first electric cars in the history of the Chery concern was created, the Riich M1 EV model.

At the end of 2009, the Riich model range was expanded with a fourth model, the mid-size sedan G5, which was the first Chinese car to also pass tests on the German track Nürburgring. It was not until a year and a half later, in August 2011, that Riich moved on to further expand its offering. The first to hit the market was the flagship, upper-class sedan Riich G6, which, like the smaller G5, was originally developed as a design for the parent brand Chery with a stylistic design by the Italian studio Bertone. The sixth and last model to be sold in the history of the Riich brand was the compact sedan G3 which was a luxurious variation on the cheaper product of the parent brand, Chery E5.

=== Failure and abandonment of the brand ===
In addition to the models that went on sale under the Riich brand between 2009 and 2011, the Chery concern also planned further models. These included the Z5 compact coupe, which never made it beyond the development stage, as did the X6 mid-size SUV and the G2 subcompact hatchback. The body range of the flagship G6 was to be expanded with a coupé variant, and the family based on the urban M1 was planned to be expanded with further variations.

The extensive development plans were thwarted by the low popularity of Riich cars, which in 2012 prompted the management of the Chery concern to abandon plans for further development of the branch together with the Rely introduced in parallel 3 years ago. In April 2013, the Riich brand was officially withdrawn from the market, and with that, production of all its models ended. The abandonment of the brand coincided with the entry into an advanced stage of design work on its would-be model, Riich X3 crossover. It was the only one to be brought into production form, debuting in November 2013 under the parent brand as Chery Tiggo 5.

== Products ==
The first Riich product to enter production was the G6, a medium-to-high end sedan solely developed by Chery and offered with a 3.0-litre V6 engine or a 2.0-litre turbocharged engine.

The Riich X1 mini SUV was launched in November 2009, and the G5 mid-size sedan in December 2009.

=== Former models ===
- Riich G2 (Cancelled), compact hatchback
- Riich G3 (2011–2013), compact Sedan
- Riich G5 (2009–2013), mid-size Sedan
- Riich G6 (2009–2013), full-size Sedan
- Riich M1 (2009–2014), subcompact Hatchback
- Riich M5 (2009–2014), subcompact Noteback
- Riich X1 (2009–2014), subcompact Station wagon
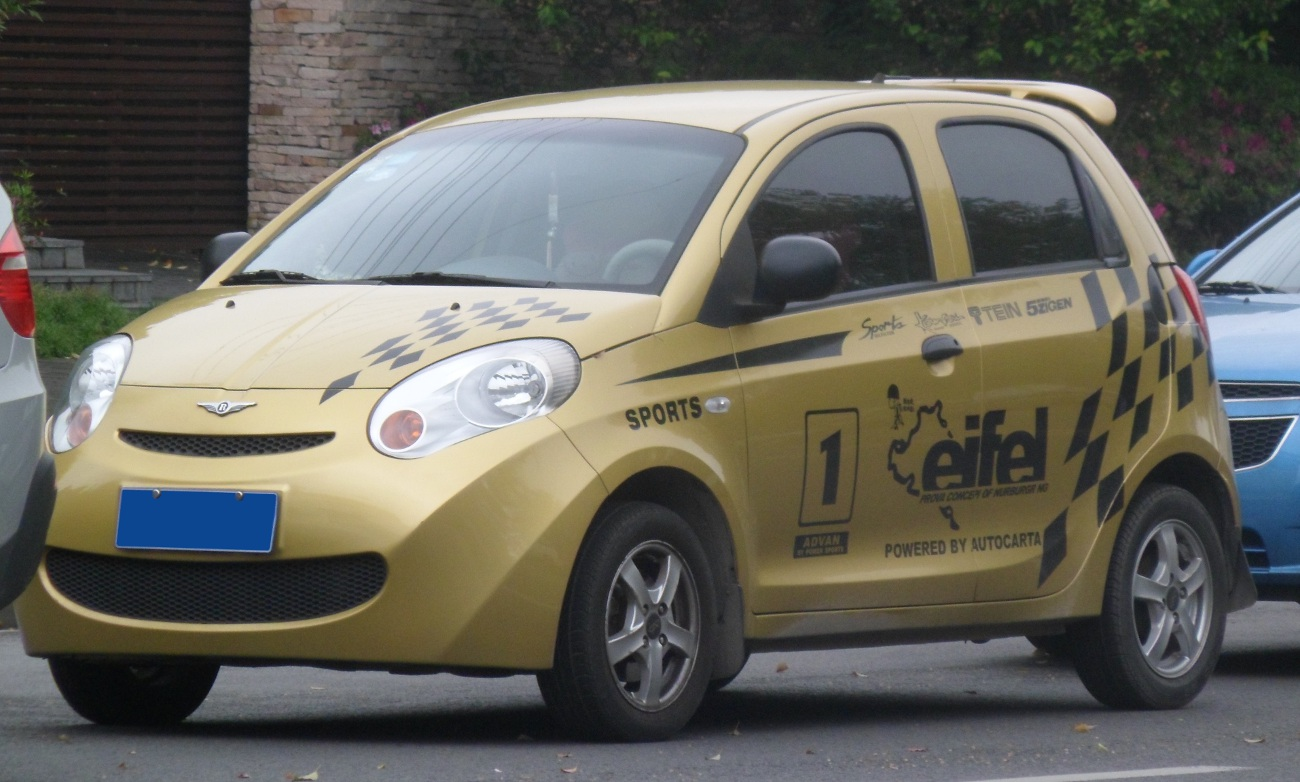
Riich M1

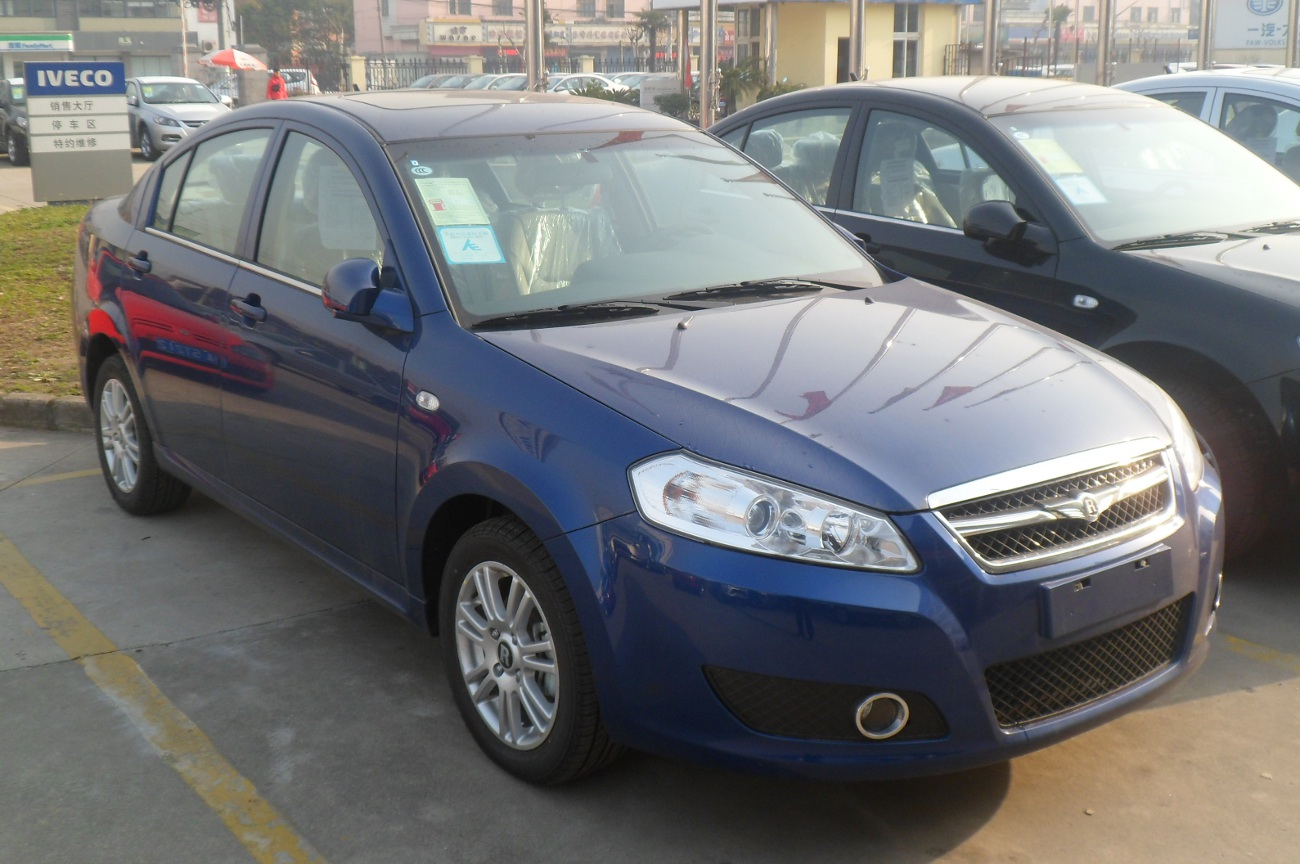
Riich G3

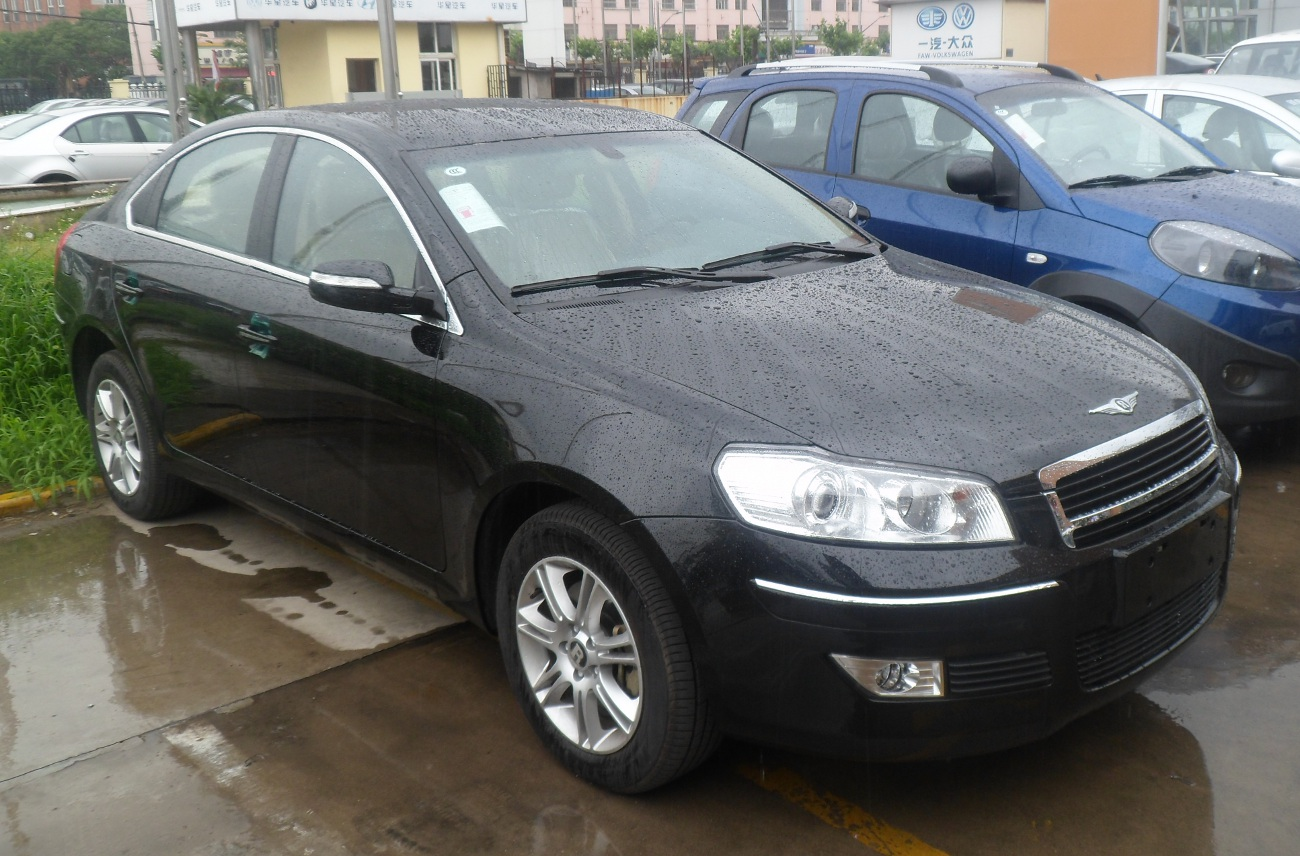
Riich G5

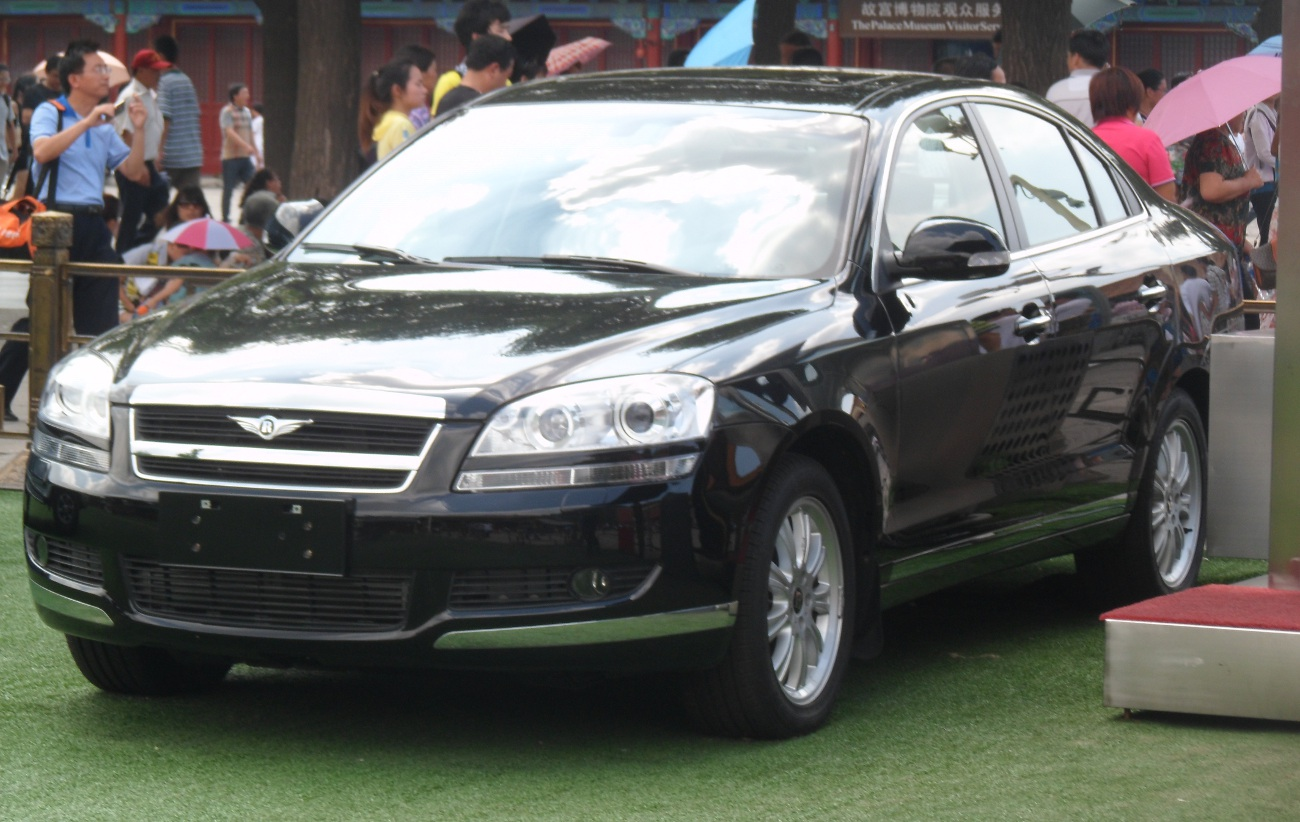
Riich G6

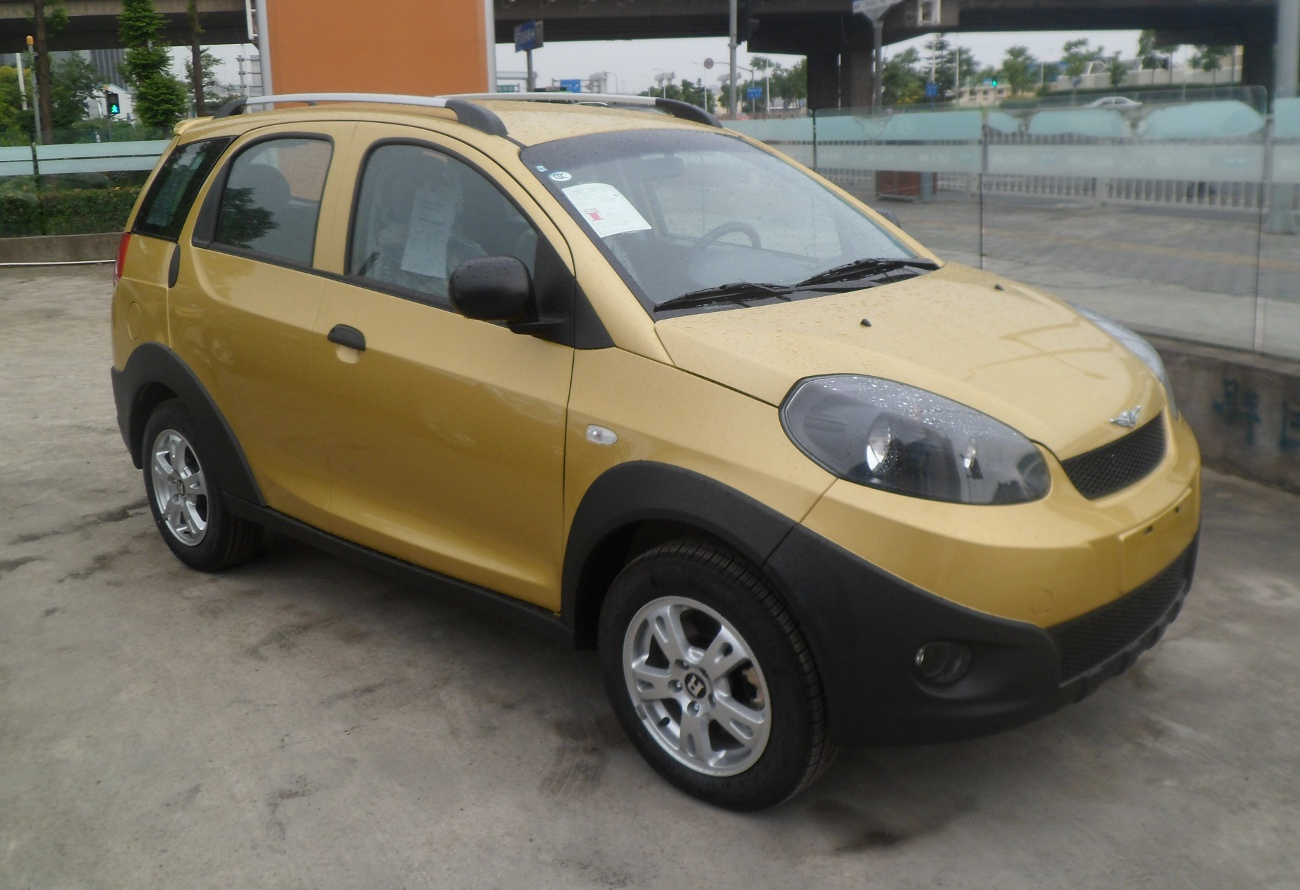
Riich X1
