= Chery ACTECO engine =

Motor vehicle engine

ACTECO is an automobile engine brand created by Chinese automotive manufacturer Chery. Engines range in size from 800 cc to 4,000 cc, with architectures including a straight-4 and V8. The range was developed with Austrian company AVL.

The engine was developed in 1997. Chery Powertrain Division is affiliated with Chery Automobile Co. and provides all the powertrains in the Chery range of vehicles.

In November 2006, Fiat announced that it would use Chery-produced 1.6 L and 1.8 L ACTECO engines starting with the Fiat Linea.

John Deere uses Chery engines in their XUV Gator model 825i and 590i (2 cylinder, EFI DOHC).

The petrol version of the Moke revival uses a 1.1-liter (1,083-cc) SQR472F I4, 68 hp (50 kW) four-cylinder powertrain built by ACTECO.
