= Night bus (disambiguation) =

Night bus may refer to:

- The Night Bus, a 2007 Iranian film directed by Kiumars Pourahmad
- Night Bus (2007 film), an Italian noir-comedy film directed by Davide Marengo
- Night Bus (2017 film), an Indonesian thriller film
- The Knight Bus, a magical vehicle in the Harry Potter series
- Night service (public transport), also called night bus, owl service
- Night bus lines in Israel
- Night buses in London
- All Nighter (bus service), night bus service network in San Francisco Bay Area, California

See also:

- NightRide (bus service), bus service in Sydney, Australia
