= Telco =

Telco or TELCO may refer to:

- Telephone company, a provider of telecommunications services, such as telephony and data communications
  - Telco, one of the companies that formed the Telecommunications Services of Trinidad and Tobago
  - Telco Systems, a telecommunications systems manufacturer based in Mansfield, Massachusetts, USA
- TATA Engineering and Locomotive Company, an Indian automobile company firm
- Tokyo Electric Light Co, predecessor of TEPCO
