= Henry Cuellar =

American politician and attorney (born 1955)

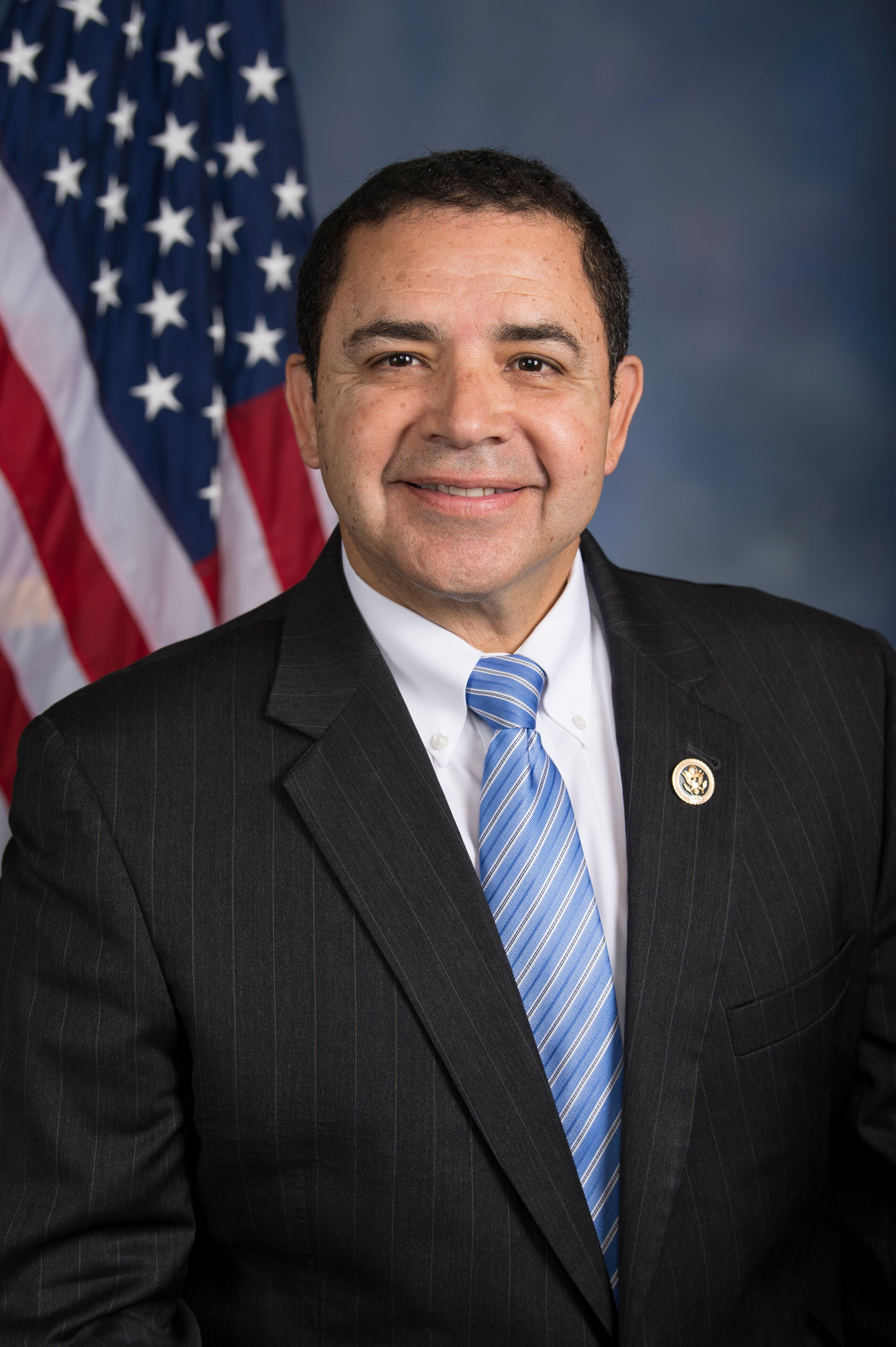
- Official portrait, 2017

Member of the U.S. House of Representatives from Texas's 28th district
- Incumbent
- Assumed office January 3, 2005
- Preceded by: Ciro Rodriguez

102nd Secretary of State of Texas
- In office January 2, 2001 – October 5, 2001
- Governor: Rick Perry
- Preceded by: Elton Bomer
- Succeeded by: Geoff Connor (acting)

Member of the Texas House of Representatives
- In office January 13, 1987 – January 2, 2001
- Preceded by: W. N. Hall
- Succeeded by: Richard Raymond
- Constituency: 43rd district (1987–1993); 42nd district (1993–2001)

Personal details
- Born: Enrique Roberto Cuellar; September 19, 1955 (age 71) Laredo, Texas, U.S.
- Party: Democratic
- Spouse: Imelda Cuellar
- Children: 2
- Education: Laredo College (AA); Georgetown University (BS); University of Texas, Austin (JD, PhD); Texas A&M International University (MA); Naval War College (MS)
- Website: House website Campaign website
- Cuellar's voice Cuellar supporting the Jaime Zapata and Victor Avila Federal Law Enforcement Protection Act. Recorded October 27, 2021

Enrique Roberto "Henry" Cuellar (/ˈkweɪ.ɑːr/ KWAY-ar; born September 19, 1955) is an American politician and attorney serving as the U.S. representative for Texas's 28th congressional district since 2005. He is a member of the Democratic Party, and his district spans from the Rio Grande toward the suburbs of San Antonio. Cuellar served in the Texas House of Representatives for 14 years, from 1987 to 2001, and briefly served as the Texas secretary of state in 2001, making him the most recent Democrat to have held a statewide office in Texas pre-2026 midterm elections.

Cuellar was first elected to Congress in 2004, after defeating incumbent Ciro Rodriguez in a primary challenge. Known as a leading centrist Democrat, he is one of the most conservative House Democrats. Since first being elected, he has since been comfortably reelected in every general election while surviving a number of competitive primary races, most notably in 2020 and 2022.

In early May 2024, Cuellar was indicted on money laundering, bribery and conspiracy charges by a federal grand jury in Houston, Texas; he was alleged to have accepted nearly $600,000 from the Azerbaijani government and a Mexican commercial bank in order to influence U.S. policy. He was pardoned by President Donald Trump in December 2025 before the case was brought to trial.

== Early life and education ==
Cuellar was born in Laredo, Texas. Both of his parents were Mexican-American. His father, Martín Siller Cuéllar Sr. (1926–2019), was born in Tamaulipas, Mexico, and immigrated to the United States. His mother, the late Odilia Pérez (1928–2015), was a native of Zapata, Texas.

Cuellar graduated in 1974 from J. W. Nixon High School. He received an Associate of Arts degree from Laredo Community College, then known as Laredo Junior College. He then attended the Walsh School of Foreign Service at Georgetown University and graduated cum laude with a Bachelor of Science in foreign service. He also earned a Master of Arts (MA) in international trade from Texas A&M International University, a Juris Doctor (JD) from the University of Texas School of Law, and a Ph.D. from the University of Texas at Austin. As of 2023, he was finishing a master's in defense and strategic studies from the Naval War College, graduating in 2025.

== Early career ==
In 1981, Cuellar opened his own law firm in Laredo and became a licensed customs broker in 1983. From 1984 to 1986, he taught at Texas A&M International University as an adjunct professor of international commercial law.

=== Texas House of Representatives ===
Cuellar was a member of the Texas House of Representatives from 1987 to 2001, representing most of Laredo. During his time as a state representative, he served on the House Appropriations, Higher Education, and Calendar committees. He also served on several national legislative committees dealing with state budgets, the U.S.–Mexico border, and international trade.

=== Texas secretary of state ===
In 2001, Governor Rick Perry appointed Cuellar to be Secretary of State of Texas. He served in the office for just over nine months until his resignation, after which Geoff Connor held the position in an acting capacity. As of 2025, Cuellar is the last Democrat to have served in the role. During his short time as Texas secretary of state, Cuellar issued an opinion that, while not legally binding, argued that home-rule cities in the state of Texas could not adopt ranked-choice voting for their elections under the Texas Constitution. That opinion has been the primary basis for the city of Austin ignoring the passage of the city's 2021 Proposition E, which would have adopted ranked-choice voting in Austin.

== U.S. House of Representatives ==
=== Elections ===
==== 2002 ====
In 2002, Cuellar was the Democratic nominee for the House of Representatives in Texas's 23rd congressional district. He lost to five-term incumbent Republican Henry Bonilla 52%–47% in the closest race Bonilla had faced up to that point.

==== 2004 ====
Cuellar spent much of early 2003 preparing for a rematch against Bonilla. However, redistricting shifted most of Laredo, which had been the heart of the 23rd since its creation in 1966, into the 28th district, represented by Ciro Rodriguez. Cuellar challenged Rodriguez, a former friend, for the nomination, winning by 58 votes. The Washington Post described the campaign as "nasty". The initial count gave Rodriguez a 145-vote lead, but, after a recount, Cuellar led by 58 votes. Cuellar's victory was one of only two primary upsets of incumbents from either party in the entire country. The 28th district was far more Democratic than the 23rd, making him heavily favored in the general election. In November, he defeated the Republican by a 20-point margin, becoming the first Laredoan in over 20 years to be elected to represent the 28th district.

==== 2006 ====
On March 7, 2006, Cuellar again defeated Rodriguez in the Democratic primary with 52% of the vote in a three-way race. No Republican filed. On June 29, the U.S. Supreme Court ruled that the Texas Legislature had violated Latino voters' rights when it shifted most of Laredo out of the 23rd and replaced it with heavily Republican San Antonio suburbs. As a result, nearly every congressional district from El Paso to San Antonio had to be redrawn, and the primary results for these districts were invalidated. A court drew a new map in which all of Laredo was moved into the 28th district while the south San Antonio area was moved to the 23rd. An election open to all candidates with a runoff if no candidate won 50% was scheduled for the date of the general election, November 7, 2006. In the general election on November 7, 2006, Cuellar had no Republican opposition. He handily defeated Ron Avery of McQueeney, the chairman of the conservative Constitution Party in Guadalupe County, and Democrat Frank Enriquez, a McAllen trial attorney, with nearly 68% of the vote.

==== 2008 ====
Cuellar was unopposed in the Democratic primary on March 4, 2008. In the general election, he outran President Barack Obama, winning nearly 70% of the vote to win reelection while the president won 56% in the district.

==== 2010 ====
Cuellar was unopposed for the Democrat nomination in 2010 and won reelection in the general election.

==== 2012 ====
Cuellar was opposed in the November 6 general election by Republican and Libertarian Party candidates. Guadalupe County, a Republican stronghold that usually opposed Cuellar for reelection, was removed from the reconfigured 28th district. Cuellar defeated the Republican, 112,262 votes (68%) to 49,095 votes (30%). Hisel took 2% of the vote, and a Green Party candidate received the remaining 1%.

==== 2014 ====
Cuellar was unopposed in the Democratic primary and faced no Republican opposition in 2014.

==== 2016 ====
Cuellar won a rematch in the March 1, 2016, Democratic primary with former Republican congressional candidate William R. Hayward, who switched parties to run again for the House. Cuellar received 49,962 votes (89.8%) to Hayward's 5,682 (10.2%). Cuellar then defeated Republican Zeffen Patrick Hardin in the November 8 general election, 122,086 (66.2%) to 57,740 (31.3%). Green Party nominee Michael D. Cary received 4,616 votes (2.5%).

==== 2018 ====
In 2018, Cuellar was unopposed in the Democratic primary. He won 84.4% (117,178 votes) in the general election.

==== 2020 ====
On January 11, 2019, the progressive organization Justice Democrats, which supported U.S. representative Alexandria Ocasio-Cortez's successful 2018 primary campaign in New York City, announced that it was seeking a primary challenger against Cuellar in the Democratic primary scheduled for March 4, 2020. On July 13, 2019, the Justice Democrats organization announced its support for Jessica Cisneros, a 26-year-old immigration and human rights attorney from Laredo who had announced a primary campaign against Cuellar. Cuellar defeated Cisneros 51.8% to 48.2% in the primary. He won the general election in November with 58.3% of the vote, defeating Republican nominee Sandra Whitten and Libertarian nominee Bekah Congdon.

==== 2022 ====
In a rematch of the 2020 primary, Cuellar finished first with a plurality in the Democratic primary, tallying 23,552 votes, 48.4%, over Cisneros, who received 22,745 votes, 46.9%. Cuellar and Cisneros qualified for the May runoff while a third candidate, Tannya Benavides, was eliminated after getting 2,289 votes (4.7%). During the runoff, Cuellar faced renewed scrutiny over an incident in 2018 where he fired a pregnant staffer who had requested parental leave and subsequently suffered a miscarriage, and according to court documents, subsequently urged other staffers to help him discredit her. On June 7, trailing by 281 votes in the runoff, Cisneros requested a recount to be conducted by the Texas Democrat Party. Cuellar extended his lead to a 289-vote margin during the recount. The Associated Press called the race on June 21, 2022. Cuellar went on to easily win reelection against the Republican nominee.

==== 2024 ====
During the primary election process, Cuellar gathered support from key party leaders; the endorsements were seen as a move to head off a primary challenge against him. Leaders that endorsed him for 2024 included Democrat leader Hakeem Jeffries, whip Katherine Clark, and Democratic Caucus chairman Pete Aguilar. Former speaker Nancy Pelosi, former majority leader Steny Hoyer and assistant democrat leader Jim Clyburn also endorsed Cuellar. On July 1, 2024, it was reported that Cuellar's office is the worst-paid U.S. House office. The median salary in his office is $47,480. Cuellar faced Republican political newcomer Jay Furman in the general election. Cuellar narrowly defeated Furman by just under a 5% winning margin, the closest election of his congressional career. Trump carried the district in the concurrent presidential election, making Cuellar one of only 13 Democrats to win in a district that Trump won.

=== Committee assignments ===
For the 119th Congress:

- Committee on Appropriations
  - Subcommittee on Defense
  - Subcommittee on Homeland Security
  - Subcommittee on Military Construction, Veterans Affairs, and Related Agencies

=== Caucus memberships ===
- Blue Dog Coalition
- New Democrat Coalition
- Afterschool Caucuses
- Congressional Hispanic Caucus
- United States Congressional International Conservation Caucus (co-chair)
- U.S.-Japan Caucus

== Political positions ==
Cuellar is widely viewed as a centrist Democrat, making him one of the most conservative members of the House Democratic Caucus. He has described himself as a "moderate centrist" and a "good old conservative Democrat". During the 117th Congress, he voted with the Democratic caucus 96.8% of the time.

During the first Trump administration, Cuellar voted with the Democrat majority 87.9% of the time, while voting with Trump's stance 40.6% of the time. Cuellar was ranked the 6th-most bipartisan member of the House of Representatives in the first session of the 117th United States Congress by the Lugar Center and McCourt School of Public Policy. He is a member of the conservative Blue Dog Coalition and was its former chairman. As of August 2023, Cuellar had voted in line with Joe Biden's stated position 96% of the time. (Note: The average member of the caucus voted with the majority on 96.6% of occasions.)

=== Environmental policy ===
On June 26, 2009, Cuellar voted with the House majority to pass the American Clean Energy and Security Act, also known as the cap and trade bill. In March 2023, Cuellar announced that he would vote to roll back environmental regulations in President Biden's Inflation Reduction Act, making him one of only two Democrats to do so.

=== Foreign policy ===
Cuellar supports U.S. support for Ukraine in the wake of Russia's invasion. In the wake of news that the Iranian regime was supplying drones to Russia to use in the war, Cuellar led a bipartisan letter calling for the Biden administration to cripple Iran's access to technology so that American-made technology is not used to feed Russia's war. Cuellar voted to provide Israel with support following the October 7 attacks. In March 2026, Cuellar was one of four House Democrats who voted against a War Powers Resolution designed to curb President Donald Trump’s military actions against Iran. Reports noted that all four Democrats who voted against the resolution had received donations from the American Israel Public Affairs Committee (AIPAC).

=== Health ===
On March 21, 2010, Cuellar voted for the Affordable Care Act, which passed the House by a vote of 219–212.

==== Abortion ====
Cuellar opposes abortion rights. He has voted for a ban on abortion after 20 weeks. In 2021, he was the only Democrat to vote against the Women's Health Protection Act, which aims to preserve access to abortion nationwide. The Act was proposed in response to the Texas Heartbeat Act, which bans abortion after 6 weeks in Texas. In 2023, he was among the four Democrats who voted to amend the annual defense policy bill to ban a Biden administration policy that allowed service members to be reimbursed for abortion-related travel and other expenses.

=== Immigration ===
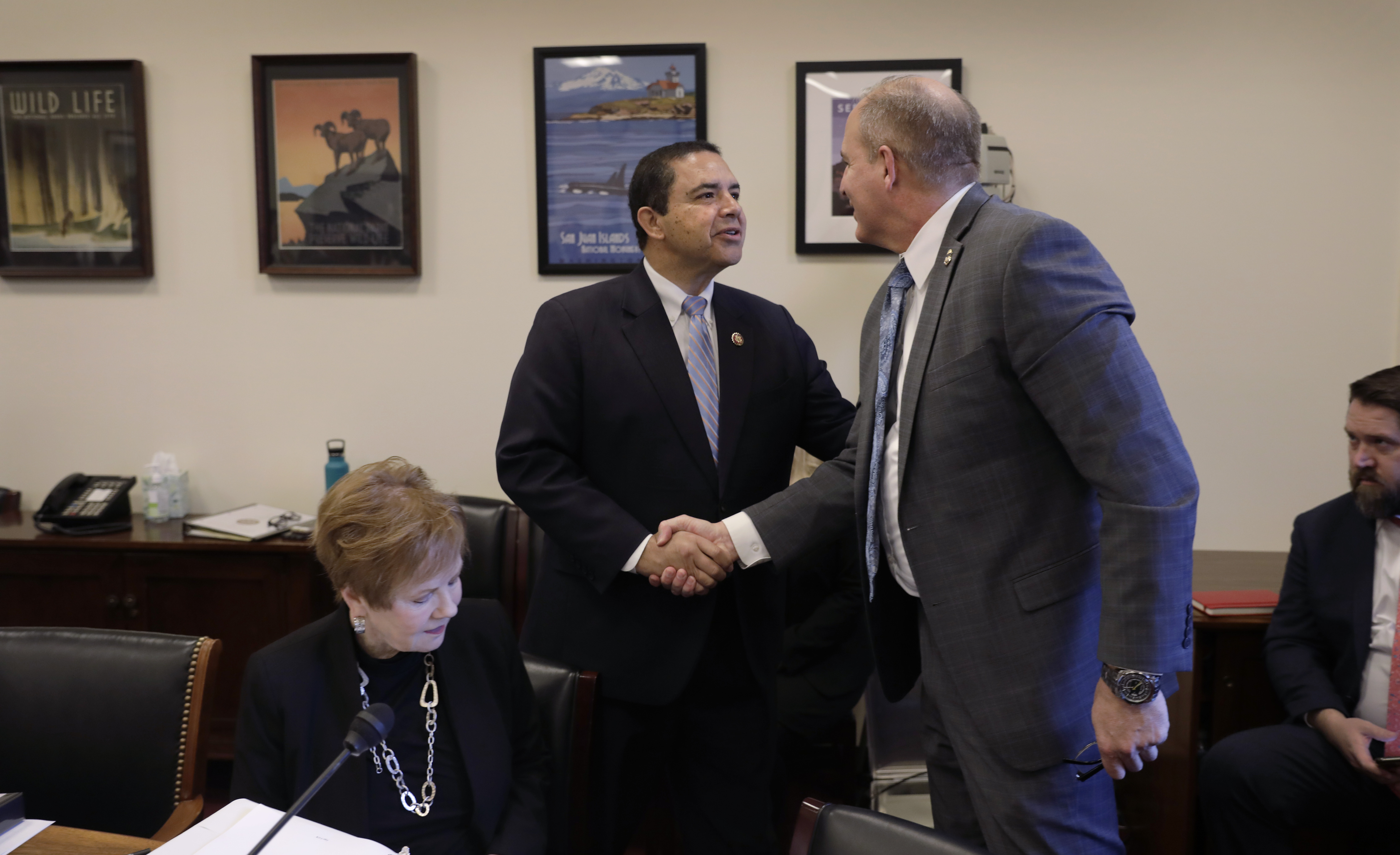
Cuellar meets with acting U.S. Customs and Border Protection Commissioner Mark A. Morgan

In 2011, Cuellar authored and co-sponsored legislation seeking to honor slain ICE agent Jaime Zapata. Billed as a border security bill, it would increase cooperation among state, local, and federal law enforcement agencies during investigations of human and drug smuggling from Mexico. In 2013, in a statement with House colleagues Beto O'Rourke and Filemon Vela Jr., Cuellar renewed his opposition to a border fence along the Rio Grande between the U.S. and Mexico. He denounced inclusion in the Senate immigration bill of an amendment sponsored by senators Bob Corker and John Hoeven that called for 700 additional miles of border fencing, calling the fence an antiquated solution to a modern problem. The fence, he said, ignores the economic ties between the two nations, which reached $500 billion in 2012.

Cuellar was one of three Democrats to vote for Kate's Law, which expands maximum sentences for immigrants who reenter the U.S. after being deported. He supported legislation to strip federal funding for jurisdictions that have sanctuary policies in place. On January 22, 2026, Cuellar was one of seven Democrats who voted to pass HR 7147 funding for the Dept. of Homeland Security, including funding for United States Immigration and Customs Enforcement (ICE). As Ranking Member of the House Appropriations Subcommittee on Homeland Security, Cuellar had helped negotiate the bill and urged Democrat colleagues in a closed-door caucus meeting to support it. The vote came two weeks after an ICE officer fatally shot Renée Good in Minneapolis and two days before two Border Patrol agents killed Alex Pretti in the same city. Defending his vote, Cuellar said the bill included oversight provisions and argued it was "better than the alternatives of either funding the department under a continuing resolution or shutting down the government." In June 2026, Cuellar assisted in getting a nun from Nigeria, Leticia "Letty" Ugboaja, released from ICE custody after she was arrested while walking along a road to attend mass in McAllen, Texas.

=== Infrastructure ===
Cuellar is a leading proponent for the proposed expansion of passenger rail from San Antonio, Texas, to Monterrey, Mexico, a project he has advocated since 2008. He spearheaded support for feasibility studies by both the United States and Mexican governments on the proposal and has sought federal funding to supplement private funds in a public-private partnership. An agreement has been signed between United States and Mexican officials to explore the proposal. The project is supported by Samuel García, governor of Nuevo León state where Monterrey is located. The governor visited Washington, D.C. in 2021 on a trip hosted by Cuellar's office to build support for the proposed link. The train's route would connect San Antonio to Monterrey in two hours, with a stop in Laredo, within Cuellar's district.

Cuellar was instrumental in shepherding through passage of the bipartisan infrastructure deal in 2021. He was one of nine Democrats who threatened to boycott a procedural vote unless House leadership first allowed a vote on President Biden's Infrastructure Investment and Jobs Act. The effort resulted in the passage of the $1.2 trillion infrastructure bill.

=== LGBT rights ===
Cuellar supports legal same-sex marriage and voted for the Respect for Marriage Act. In 2025, Cuellar was one of two House Democrats (the other being Vicente Gonzalez) to vote in favor of the Protection of Women and Girls in Sports Act, which would ban transgender female athletes from participating in women's and girls' sports at federally funded schools and educational institutions. Later that year, he also broke party lines to vote in favor of banning gender affirming care for transgender minors, and criminalizing anyone who assists in them obtaining it.

In 2026, Cuellar was one of eight Democrats to join House Republicans in passing the Stopping Indoctrination and Protecting Kids Act. The bill would require school personnel to notify parents if a student requests to be identified by a gender different from their sex assigned at birth, and would prohibit schools from providing instruction on transgender topics.

=== Voting rights ===
On April 10, 2025, Cuellar was one of only four Democrats who joined all of the Republicans in the House in voting in favor of the Safeguard American Voter Eligibility Act, commonly known as the SAVE Act. The bill places strict requirements to prove American citizenship in order to vote in federal elections.

=== Other ===
On June 15, 2007, Cuellar endorsed then U.S. senator Hillary Clinton for president in 2008. He said, "Senator Clinton is the only candidate with the experience and toughness to hit the ground running on her first day in the White House." In 2007, he held a fundraiser for Clinton in Laredo that raised over $200,000 and was attended by former president Bill Clinton.

Cuellar supported the return of earmarks to Congress and has used his position on Appropriations to become one of the 20 top earmarkers in Congress.

On December 18, 2019, Cuellar voted in favor of both articles of impeachment against Trump. Following the January 6, 2021, attack on the U.S. Capitol by Trump supporters, Cuellar called for a second impeachment of Donald Trump. On January 13, he voted in favor of impeachment.

In 2020, Cuellar was one of six House Democrats to vote against the Marijuana Opportunity Reinvestment and Expungement (MORE) Act, which aimed to legalize cannabis at the federal level. In 2014, he voted for a Republican measure blocking the implementation of a Washington, D.C., decriminalization law. Cuellar is an opponent of the Rohrabacher–Farr amendment which would limit the enforcement of the federal law criminalizing marijuana in states that have legalized medical cannabis.

Cuellar has supported automated license plate recognition federal contractor Perceptics and has been linked to lobbying on behalf of the firm by Podesta Group. Perceptics CEO John Dalton called him a "friendly congressman" for Perceptics.

In September 2026, he voted for a resolution which denounced socialism and the Democratic Socialists of America, and called for the passage of the SAVE America Act.

==== Appropriations ====
Cuellar is currently one of only two Texas Democrats on the House Appropriations Committee and is prolific in using his perch to deliver federal funds to his district. In 2011, he delivered federal funding to open a Veterans Administration outpatient clinic operated jointly with UT Health San Antonio in Laredo, Texas. At the time, the mayor declared that the project "would not have been possible" without the congressman's support. In 2020, Cuellar secured $1.2 million in federal funding to support efforts to fight COVID-19 in Webb County.

== FBI investigation and indictment ==
On January 19, 2022, the Federal Bureau of Investigation (FBI) obtained a search warrant for Cuellar's Laredo residence and campaign office as part of a federal probe relating to the Azerbaijani government, known for its practice of "caviar diplomacy" and money laundering scandals like the Azerbaijani laundromat. A federal grand jury also issued subpoenas for records related to Cuellar, his wife, and at least one campaign staffer related to the matter. Cuellar has taken an interest in Azerbaijan and co-chairs the Congressional Azerbaijan Caucus.

As of May 2022, Cuellar's lawyer maintained Cuellar was innocent and was not a target of the investigation; the FBI had made no statement at that point. In response, party leaders including Speaker of the House Nancy Pelosi reaffirmed their support for Cuellar. As of January 2023, no arrests had been made in the case, the FBI had not indicated Cuellar was a person of interest and Cuellar was not believed to be the subject of the investigation. Cuellar easily won reelection following the incident.

On May 3, 2024, Cuellar and his wife, Imelda, were indicted on money laundering, conspiracy, and bribery charges. The indictment says that nearly $600,000 in bribes from Azerbaijan and a Mexican commercial bank was laundered into shell companies owned by Imelda from December 2014 through at least November 2021. After the indictment was unsealed, Cuellar released a supportive statement regarding his wife. Former president Donald Trump defended Cuellar. On August 14, 2025, federal judge Lee H. Rosenthal dismissed two of the charges.

After Cuellar's indictment, two political advisors he had worked with pleaded guilty to charges that they had conspired with Cuellar to launder more than $200,000 in bribes from a Mexican bank. Cuellar's indictment accuses him of accepting money from a Mexican bank in exchange for "influencing the Treasury Department to work around an anti-money laundering policy that threatened the bank's interests." The advisors, including Cuellar's former campaign manager, Colin Strother, allegedly facilitated the payments. Strother and Florencio "Lencho" Rendon struck plea deals in exchange for cooperating with the investigation into Cuellar; they each face up to 20 years in prison and fines in excess of $100,000. Cuellar has said he is innocent of the charges and that his actions were "consistent with the actions of many of my colleagues and in the interest of the American people."

Cuellar was represented by criminal defense attorney Josh Berman of Clifford Chance LLP. Cuellar's criminal trial was originally scheduled to begin in September 2025, but a federal judge moved the date to April 2026, along with dropping two of the 14 charges. A federal judge denied Cuellar's request to move the trial from Houston to Laredo. On December 3, 2025, President Donald Trump unconditionally pardoned Cuellar and his wife, saying Cuellar was targeted by the Joe Biden administration for criticizing Biden's border policy. Trump later criticized Cuellar for "a lack of loyalty" for not switching his party allegiance to the Republican Party.

== Personal life ==
Cuellar is one of eight children. His father was a migrant worker. A brother, Martin Cuellar, serves as Sheriff in Webb County. A sister, Rosie Cuellar, is the municipal judge in Rio Bravo. Cuellar and his wife, Imelda, have two daughters. In 2014, Cuellar portrayed George Washington during the annual Washington's Birthday Celebration in Laredo. Cuellar is Roman Catholic.

On October 2, 2023, around 9:30 p.m. ET, Cuellar was held at gunpoint and carjacked by three robbers outside of his Washington, D.C., apartment residence. The suspects stole Cuellar's vehicle, as well as his luggage, although the car and all of his belongings were recovered by law enforcement a few hours later. Cuellar was reportedly unharmed. A police investigation is ongoing.

== See also ==
- List of Hispanic and Latino Americans in the United States Congress
- List of people granted executive clemency in the second Trump presidency

== Notes ==
Political offices
Preceded by Elton Bomer	Secretary of State of Texas; 2001	Succeeded by Geoff Connor; Acting
U.S. House of Representatives
Preceded by Ciro Rodriguez	Member of the U.S. House of Representatives from Texas's 28th congressional district 2005–present	Incumbent
Party political offices
Preceded by Jim Costa	Chair of the Blue Dog Coalition for Communications; 2017–2019; Served alongside: Jim Costa (Administration), Dan Lipinski (Policy)	Succeeded by Lou Correa
U.S. order of precedence (ceremonial)
Preceded by Jim Costa	United States representatives by seniority 46th	Succeeded by Virginia Foxx
Preceded by Debbie Wasserman Schultz	Order of precedence of the United States	Succeeded by Al Green
