= Given Imaging =

Israeli medical technology company

Given Imaging Ltd.
- Type: Private
- Traded as: Nasdaq: GIVN; TASE: GIVN
- Industry: Medical technology
- Founded: 1998; 28 years ago
- Headquarters: Yokneam Illit, Israel
- Key people: Homi Shamir (CEO)
- Products: Capsule endoscopy
- Revenue: ▲US$ 177.95 million (2011)
- Operating income: ▲US$ 12.98 million (2011)
- Net income: ▲US$ 11.97 million (2011)
- Owner: Medtronic
- Number of employees: 800
- Website: givenimaging.com

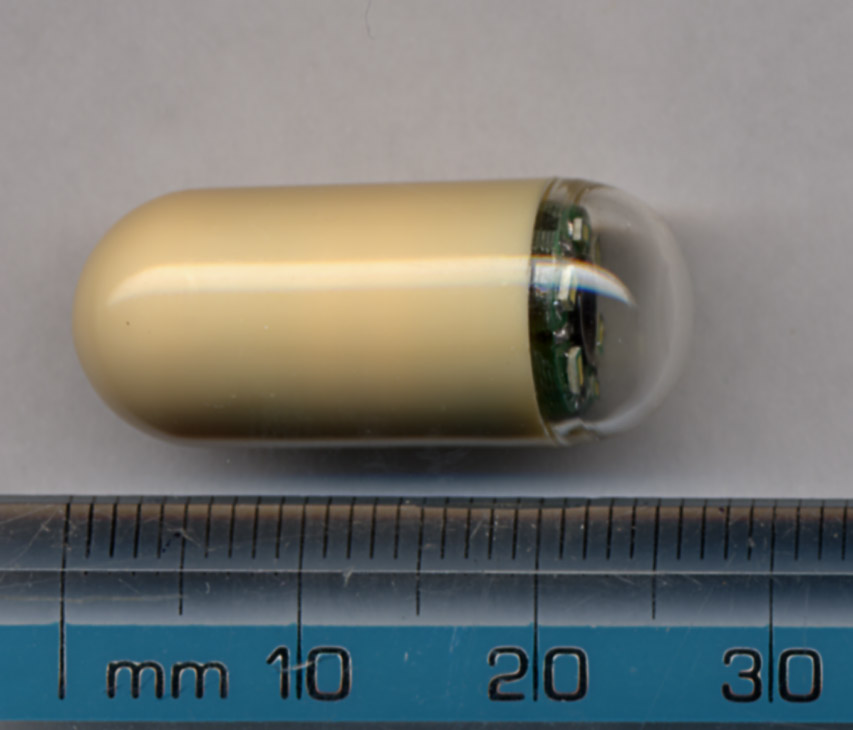
Endoscopic capsule

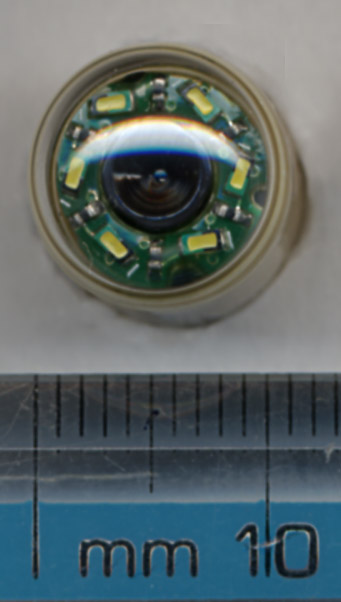
Endoscopic capsule end-on, showing six LEDs and camera lens.

Given Imaging Ltd. (Hebrew: גיוון אימג'ינג) was an Israeli medical technology company that made and sold diagnostic products for the visualization and detection of disorders of the gastrointestinal tract. Until February 2014, it was dual-listed on both the NASDAQ and the Tel Aviv Stock Exchange, where it was a component of the TA-100 Index and the TA BlueTech Index. On 27 February 2014, Covidien completed its acquisition of the company for about US$860 million, and it became a private company. Covidien was acquired by Medtronic on 26 January 2015.

Given Imaging pioneered the capsule endoscopy technology and also developed capsule-based pH monitoring. Through Sierra Scientific Instruments, a subsidiary, Given Imaging also provides an array of diagnostic modalities including high-resolution manometry and ambulatory reflux monitoring.

== History ==
Given Imaging was founded in 1998 by Gavriel Meron and Rafael Development Corporation (RDC) Ltd. based on the purchase of an early patent from Rafael Advanced Defense Systems Ltd. Initial funding for the company was provided by Elron Electronic Industries, Israel's leading technology holding company, in cooperation with Rafael. Elron sold all of its shares, directly and through its affiliate RDC, when Covidien completed its purchase of the company in February 2014. The idea for the solution was developed by Dr. Iddan, while working in the missile division of Rafael, where he envisioned that missile technology could be miniaturized to create a medical product.

The company's first capsule endoscopy product was the M2A capsule. It received CE marking in May 2001 and in August 2001 was cleared by the US Food and Drug Administration (FDA) for visualization of abnormalities of the small intestine. The capsule uses a radio developed for Given by Zarlink Semiconductor's medical team in San Diego and Jarfalla, Sweden.

In October 2001, Given Imaging had an Initial public offering on NASDAQ under ticker GIVN. In September 2004, M2A capsule re-branded PillCam SB(R).

In March 2004, Given Imaging became a member of the Tel Aviv Stock Exchange.

In November 2004, US FDA clears PillCam(R) ESO for the esophagus.

In May 2006, US FDA clears Agile Patency System.

In October 2006, PillCam COLON was cleared for marketing in the European Union (CE Mark).

In December 2008, Given Imaging acquired Bravo pH Monitoring System(R).

In May 2009, 1 millionth PillCam capsule was sold.

In September 2009, PillCam COLON 2 receives CE Mark.

In July 2012, Given Imaging's capsule endoscopy featured in a live broadcast on the BBC, when the reporter Michael Mosley spent the day as an exhibit at the Science Museum in London, after swallowing a PillCam which transmitted live pictures to a public screen.

On 8 December 2013, Covidien announced an agreement to acquire Given Imaging for US$30 per share in cash, about US$860 million net of cash and investments acquired. The deal closed on 27 February 2014, and Given Imaging became a wholly owned subsidiary of Covidien. On 26 January 2015, Medtronic completed its acquisition of Covidien.

== Products ==
=== PillCam SB ===
PillCam SB is a tool for visualization of the entire small bowel and detection of small bowel abnormalities. No sedation is needed, however bowel prep is needed. A liquid bowel prep is consumed before the procedure emptying the bowel completely, this allows clear photos to be taken.

=== PillCam ESO ===
PillCam ESO provides a method for visualization of the esophagus.

=== PillCam COLON 2 ===
PillCam COLON 2 is complementary to traditional colonoscopy and is used for patients who have received incomplete colonoscopy, are contraindicated for colonoscopy or are unwilling to undergo traditional colonoscopy.

=== PillCam CROHN'S ===
The PillCam CROHN’S system offers direct visualization of the entire small bowel and colonic mucosa with a noninvasive procedure.

=== PillCam Express ===
In May 2010, Given Imaging released a new manually guided GI scope based on PillCam swallowable devices. In cases where patient anatomy does not allow for natural passage of large tablets the size of traditional PillCams, the PillCam Express can be delivered through the stomach and into the small intestine with help of an endoscope and a proprietary balloon deployment mechanism.

=== Bravo pH Monitoring System ===
The Bravo pH Monitoring System is a catheter-free ambulatory pH test. Ambulatory pH testing is considered the gold standard for pH measurement and monitoring of gastric reflux, helping clinicians manage gastroesophageal reflux disease (GERD). Featuring data collection for up to 96 hours, Bravo allows patients to maintain their regular diets and activities, accurately reflecting normal physiologic conditions.

=== Sierra Scientific Instruments ===
In April 2010, Given Imaging acquired Sierra Scientific Instruments.

== Headquarters and plants ==
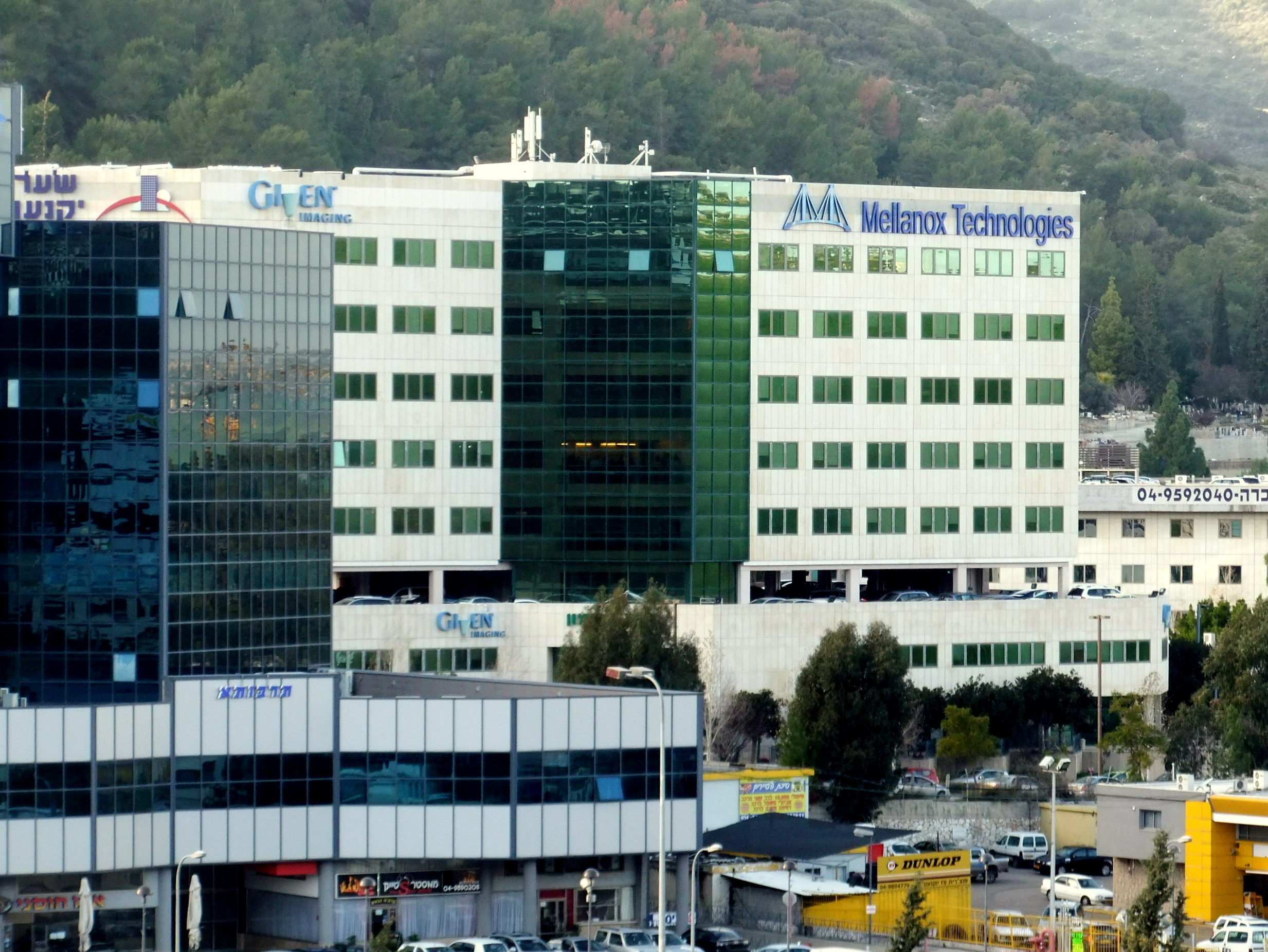
Given Imaging headquarters in Yokneam

The company's corporate headquarters, research and development laboratories, and manufacturing facilities are located in Yokneam, Israel. It maintains offices in Duluth, Georgia and Heerlen, Netherlands. Additional sales and marketing offices are located in France, Japan, Australia, and Singapore. The company also has a plant in Ireland.

Given Imaging's wholly owned subsidiary, Sierra Scientific Instruments, is located in Los Angeles, California, with manufacturing operations in Vietnam.

== See also ==
- Science and technology in Israel
- Health care in Israel
- List of Israeli inventions and discoveries
- Silicon Wadi
- Startup Village, Yokneam
