= FTSE techMARK 100 =

The FTSE techMARK 100 (pronounced "foot see"; Index code (marker): T1X) is an index derived from the FTSE techMARK All-Share Index, which represents the performance of innovative and technology companies that are listed on the London Stock Exchange's "techMARK" market.

As of May 2008, constituents of the FTSE techMARK 100 include:

- BAE Systems
- Elan Corp
- BATM Advanced Communications
- Smith & Nephew
- Shire
- Cable & Wireless
- Thomson Reuters
- Sage Group
- Cobham
- Meggitt
- Autonomy Corporation
- LogicaCMG
- ARM Holdings
- Qinetiq Group
- Spectris
- Aveva Group
- Ultra Electronics Holdings
- Dimension Data Holdings
- Renishaw
- Spirent Communications
- Micro Focus International
- Genus
- Detica Group
- Domino Printing Sciences
- Axon Group
- Computacenter
- Fidessa Group
- KCOM Group
- SDL International
- Gresham Technologies plc

== See also ==
- FTSE Group
- FTSE 100 Index
- FTSE 250 Index
- FTSE 350 Index
