= Yokneam Illit =

City in northern Israel

Yokneam Illit יקנעם עילית
- City

Hebrew transcription(s)
  - ISO 259: Yoqnˁamm ʕillit
  - Also spelled: Yoq'neam Illit
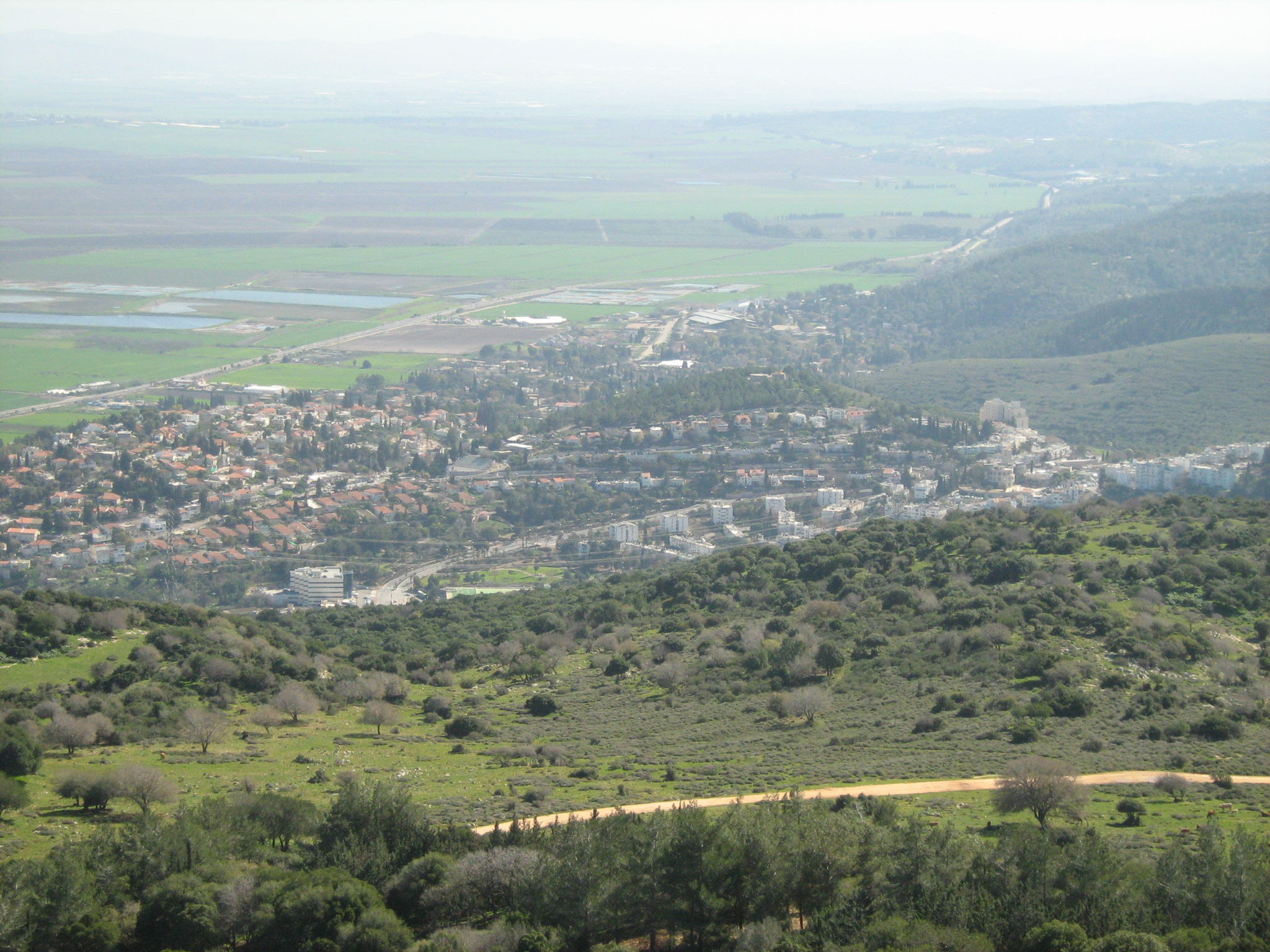
- View of Yokneam Illit

- Flag

- Location within Jezreel Valley region of Israel Location within Israel
- Coordinates: 32°39′34″N 35°06′36″E
- Country: Israel
- District: Northern
- Subdistrict: Jezreel
- Natural Region: Yokneam
- Became a city on: December 18, 2006
- Modern settlement: 1950
- Ancient city: Bronze Age

Government
  - Type: Mayor–council
  - Body: Yokneam Illit municipality
  - Mayor: Roman Peres (YB)

Area
  - Total: 7.39 km^{2} (2.85 sq mi)
- Elevation: 166 m (545 ft)

Population (2024)
  - Total: 24,928
  - Rank: 69th in Israel
  - Density: 2,478.3/km^{2} (6,419/sq mi)
  - Rank: 57th in Israel
- Demonym: Yokneami

Ethnicity
  - Jews and others: 99.9%
  - Arabs: 0.1%
- Time zone: UTC+2 (IST)
  - Summer (DST): UTC+3 (IDT)
- Postal code: 20692
- Area code: +972 (Israel) 4 (City)
- Website: www.yoqneam.org.il

Yokneam Illit (Hebrew: יקנעם עילית), also Yoqne'am Illit, is a city in the Northern District of Israel. It is located in a hilly region of the Lower Galilee at the base of the Carmel Mountains, and overlooks the Jezreel Valley. It is 21 kilometres (13 miles) from Haifa and 80 kilometres (50 mi) from Tel Aviv. Yokneam Illit, known as Israel's "Startup Village", is home to a high-tech hub surrounded by forests and small communities. In 2024 it had a population of 24,928.

Yokneam Illit was founded in 1950. It was recognized as a local council in 1967 and achieved city status in 2007. It is located on the route of Israel's major highways – Highway 70 and Highway 6. In 1989, after Simon Alfassi was elected mayor, Yokneam Illit began to attract high-tech companies looking for an alternative to Gush Dan.

Over 100 high-tech companies now operate from Yokneam Illit, generating exports of approximately 5 billion US dollars annually. Although real estate prices are low relative to the Gush Dan area, the high rate of growth has pushed prices up faster than in similar-sized cities.

== History ==
=== Antiquity ===
Yokneam appears in the list of 119 conquered cities by Egyptian Pharaoh Thutmose III after the victory in the battle of Megiddo (1468 BC).

Yokneam is mentioned in the Hebrew Bible as a city of Levites within the territory of the Israelite tribe of Zebulun (Joshua 12:1, 12:22, 19:10-11, 21:34). It is located near Megiddo (Armageddon). The Crusaders called Yokneam "Cain Mons", or "Mountain of Cain" in keeping with the tradition that Cain, son of Adam (Genesis 4: 23–24), was murdered at this site.

Yokneam was populated throughout the Persian, Hellenistic, Roman/Byzantine, Arab, Crusaders, Mameluk, and Ottoman periods. Yokneam was built on the lands of a former Arab village named Qira, depopulated in the lead up to the 1948 Arab–Israeli war.

=== British Mandate period ===
The Yokneam Moshava was established in 1935 in the area.

=== State of Israel ===
Yokneam ma'abara, 1952

In July 1950, a transit camp for Jewish immigrants and refugees was set up to absorb 250 new families and remained part of Yokneam Moshava until 1967. By the start of 1952, another 400 families were housed in the transit camp. Toward the end of 1951, the first 285 families moved from the tent camp to permanent housing on the hill above the Yokneam Moshava. In 1952, Yokneam was considered unusual in that it had a single school for all regardless of whether they were religious or secular, or from the moshava or the tent camp.

In 1964, Yokneam had 4,300 residents. 160 families were living in the moshava. In 1967, Yokneam split into two local councils: Yokneam and Yokneam Illit.

In the 1980s, 90 percent of the residents worked in the two local factories in Yokneam. In September 1990, the Soltam factory shut down creating high unemployment.

In the 1990s, Yokneam absorbed a large wave of immigrants from Ethiopia and the former Soviet Union. During that time, Yokneam's industrial parks began to attract high-tech firms.

Yokneam Illit was formally declared a city in 2006. In 2009, Yokneam Illit was linked to Highway 6 and received recognition as Israel's first "Green City" in the Cleantech competition. In the wake of these developments, Yokneam Illit became a hub for medical, cleantech and product development companies.

In 2011, 16,000 workers entered the industrial parks every day. Of these, only 4,000 were local residents.

== Demography ==
Historical population
Year	Pop.	±%
1972	3,900	—
1983	5,100	+30.8%
1995	9,200	+80.4%
2008	19,000	+106.5%
2022	23,729	+24.9%
2024	24,928	+5.1%

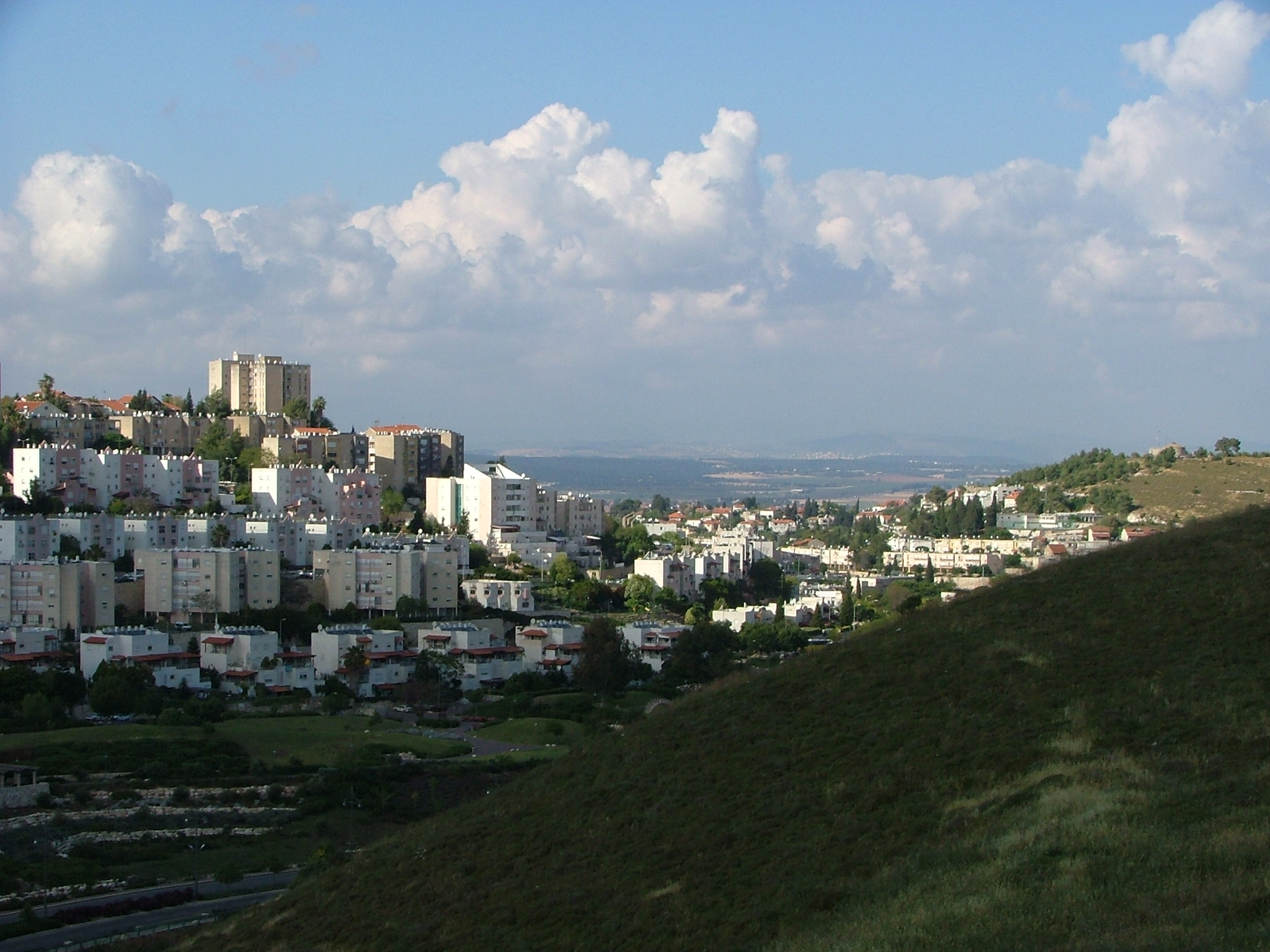
Yokneam Illit

In 2014, Yokneam had a population of 21,100. The unemployment rate was 5 percent, which was lower than the national average. The median age was 32. 76% of Yokneam Illit's residents were 40 years old or under. Eighty percent of high-school students graduated with a bagrut matriculation certificate, which was one of the highest rates in Israel. 40% of the population were college graduates. In 2022, 89.7% of the population was Jewish and 10.3% was counted as other.

== Social and economic ecosystem ==
Since the 1950s when Yokneam Moshava and Yokneam Illit shared a single school, social integration and coexistence has been an integral part of the local culture. The first wave of immigrants to settle in the Maabara (tent camp) had major contingents from at least 6 different Jewish communities (Iran, Iraq, Kurdistan, Romania, Yemen and India), all of whom were absorbed by the Moshava which had been settled in 1935 by Jews from Germany and the Netherlands.

The next wave of new immigrants came in the 1960s from North Africa, followed by immigrants from the Soviet Union in the 1970s. In the 1990s, Yokneam Illit absorbed large numbers of immigrants from Ethiopia and the former Soviet Union.

Starting in the 1990s, the growth of high-tech companies in Yokneam Illit also brought an influx of Israeli-born residents along with an increasing number of immigrants from Western Europe, South Africa, North America and South America. During this period, the economic problems of the Kibbutz and Moshav movements led many of the young families in the Megiddo Regional Council to move to nearby Yokneam Illit.

Yokneam Illit's accelerated demand for day care and Kindergartens led to a shortage of space in local day care and Kindergartens at the same time that there was a shortage of children at some of the Kibbutzim. In order to avoid sending their children to other small communities in the area, Kibbutz children's houses and Kindergartens began accepting children from nearby Yokneam Illit, and in some cases the number of children from Yokneam Illit outnumbered the Kibbutz children. This phenomenon later extended to the elementary and secondary schools until the building of new schools in Yokneam Illit was able to catch up with demand.

Many of the children from Yokneam Illit and their families remained in the Megiddo school system, while families who moved from the Megiddo communities to Yokneam Illit were educating their children in the Yokneam Illit school system. The family ties and school friendships led to mixed Yokneam-Megiddo parents groups in both communities and nearly all sports activities and many other after-school activities being fully integrated. Today, it is extremely rare to find a local team representing only Yokneam Illit or only the Megiddo Regional Council.

The Partnership2Gether program, which partnered Yokneam Illit and the Megiddo Regional Council on the Israeli side, with the Jewish communities of Atlanta, GA and St. Louis, MO on the US side, helped institutionalize cooperation between the Yokneam Illit municipality and the Megiddo Regional Council. The impact on joint community leadership not only affected Yokneam-Megiddo, but also created an ongoing relationship between the Jewish communities of Atlanta and St. Louis.

This cross-pollination has led to an integrated economic ecosystem that help support the high-tech companies in Yokneam Illit. Examples of this cooperation can be seen in the activities of the Southeast chapter of the US-Israel Chamber of Commerce in Atlanta, and the success of companies like Given Imaging. Given Imaging, which began as a small startup in Yokneam Illit, leveraged its special relationship with the Southeast chapter of the US-Israel Chamber of Commerce when it opened its Marketing headquarters in Atlanta, GA.

== Economy ==
=== Overview ===
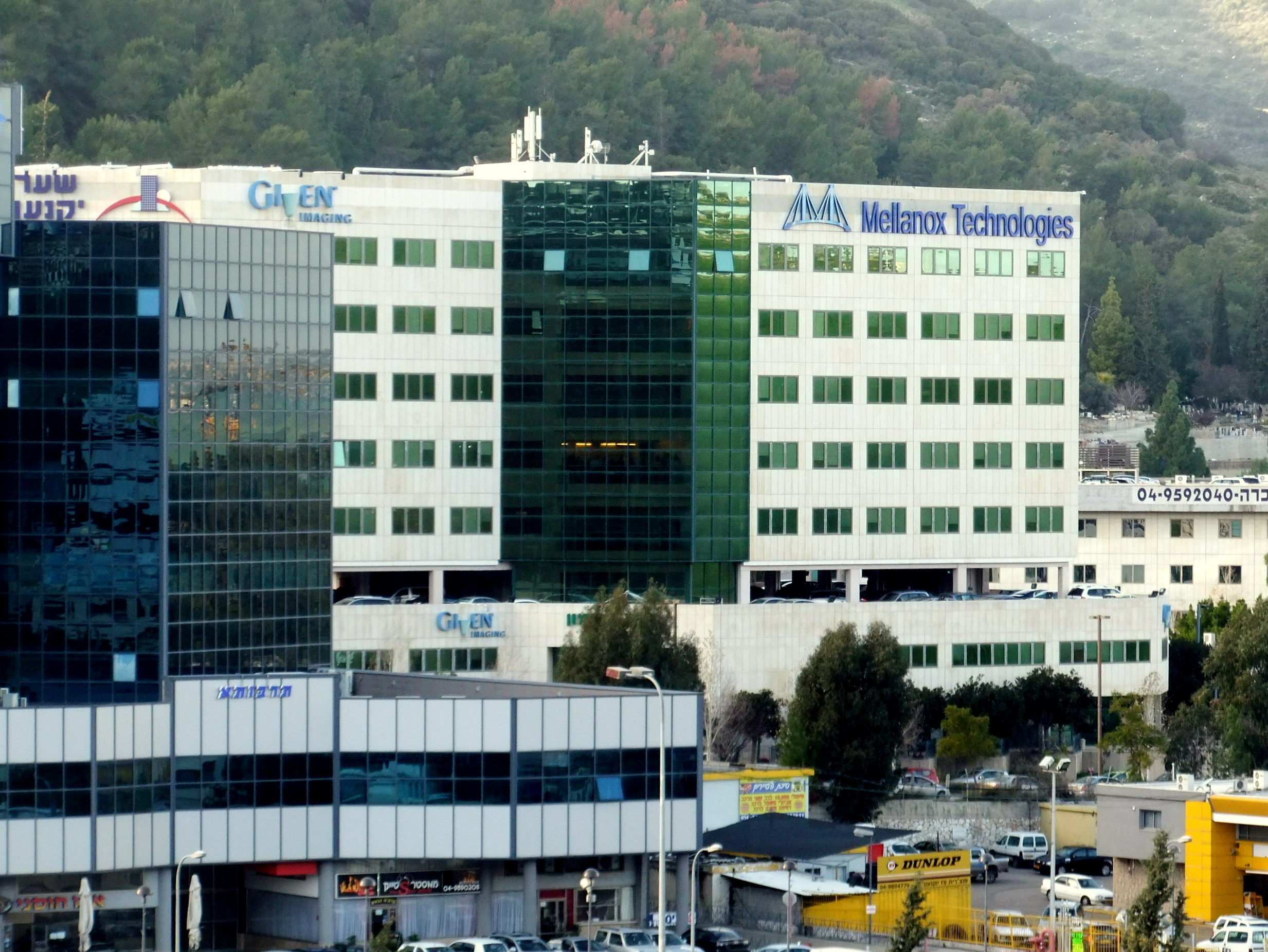
Mellanox and Given Imaging buildings

Yokneam's proximity to two major universities (Technion and University of Haifa, both in Haifa), location at the crossroads between northern Israel and the major urban areas of Tel Aviv and Jerusalem, tax benefits and investment grants associated with its status as a "National Priority Area A", and its small town surroundings and lower cost of housing all worked together to attract Israel's highest concentration of R&D companies outside of Tel Aviv and give it the nickname of Startup Village.

Under the Israeli Law for the Encouragement of Capital Investment, approved enterprises in Yokneam Illit enjoy the highest level of tax benefits and investment grants (currently up to 20% of the investment or 10 year tax exemption). In addition, companies relocating to the region can apply for concessions in local taxes over a three-year period from the Yokneam Illit Local Authority.

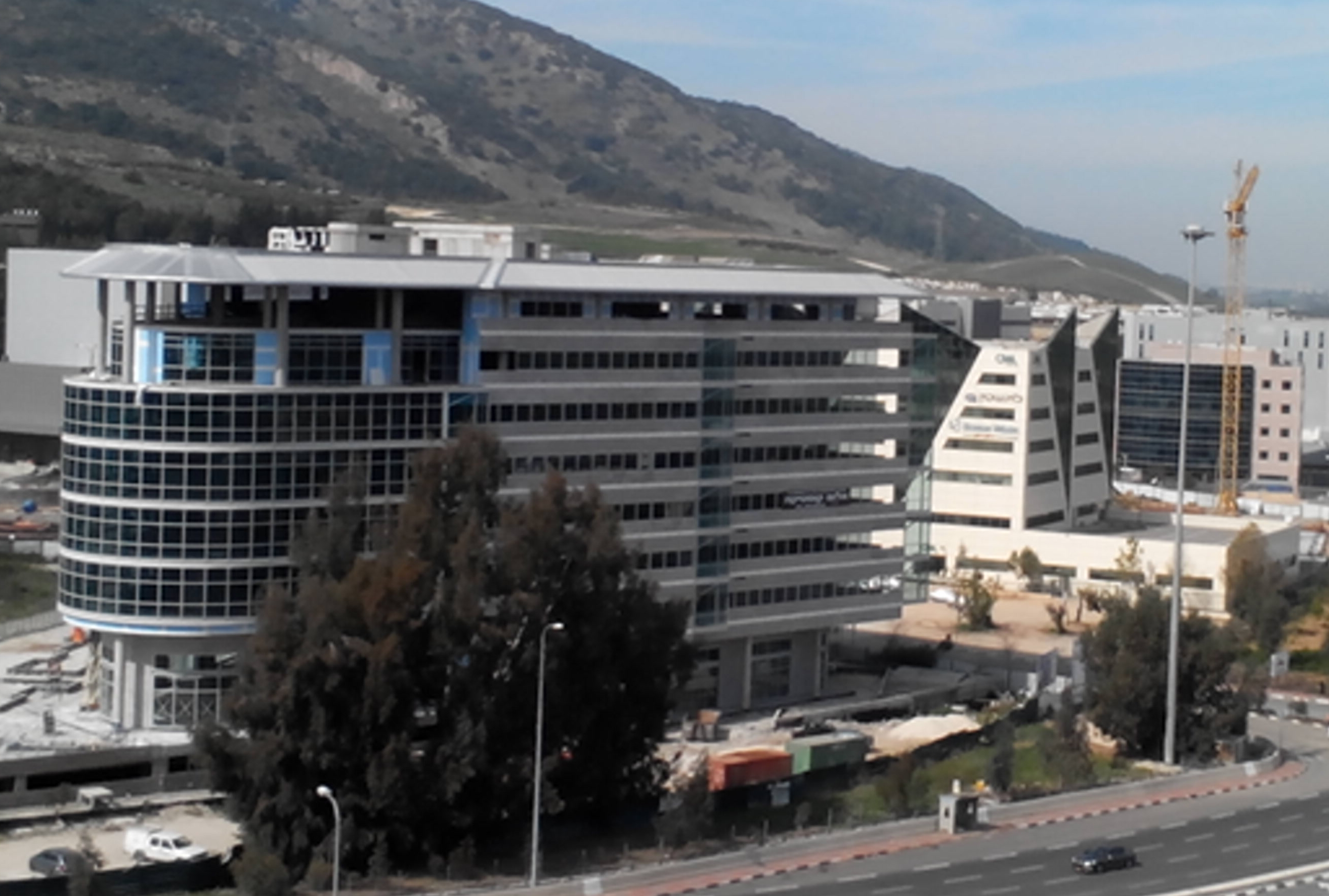
Startup Village high-tech park in Yokneam Illit

Yokneam's industrial parks are home to more than 100 high-tech companies with exports of approximately 5 billion US dollars annually. Companies specialize in a wide range of technologies, including semicondcutors, biotechnology, pharmaceuticals and medical devices. These include Intel, Panasonic Avionics Corporation, Medtronic, Given Imaging, Naiot Venture Accelerator, Mellanox Technologies, Marvell Technology Group, Biosense Webster and Lumenis. An additional high-tech park, Mevo Carmel Jewish-Arab Industrial Park, is already underway that will be a joint venture of Yokneam Illit, Megiddo Regional Council and the Druze villages of Daliyat al-Karmel and Isfiya.

The growth of the high-tech companies in Yokneam has attracted speakers and members of specialized professions, such as technical writers, to come from other parts of Israel to meet and exchange ideas.

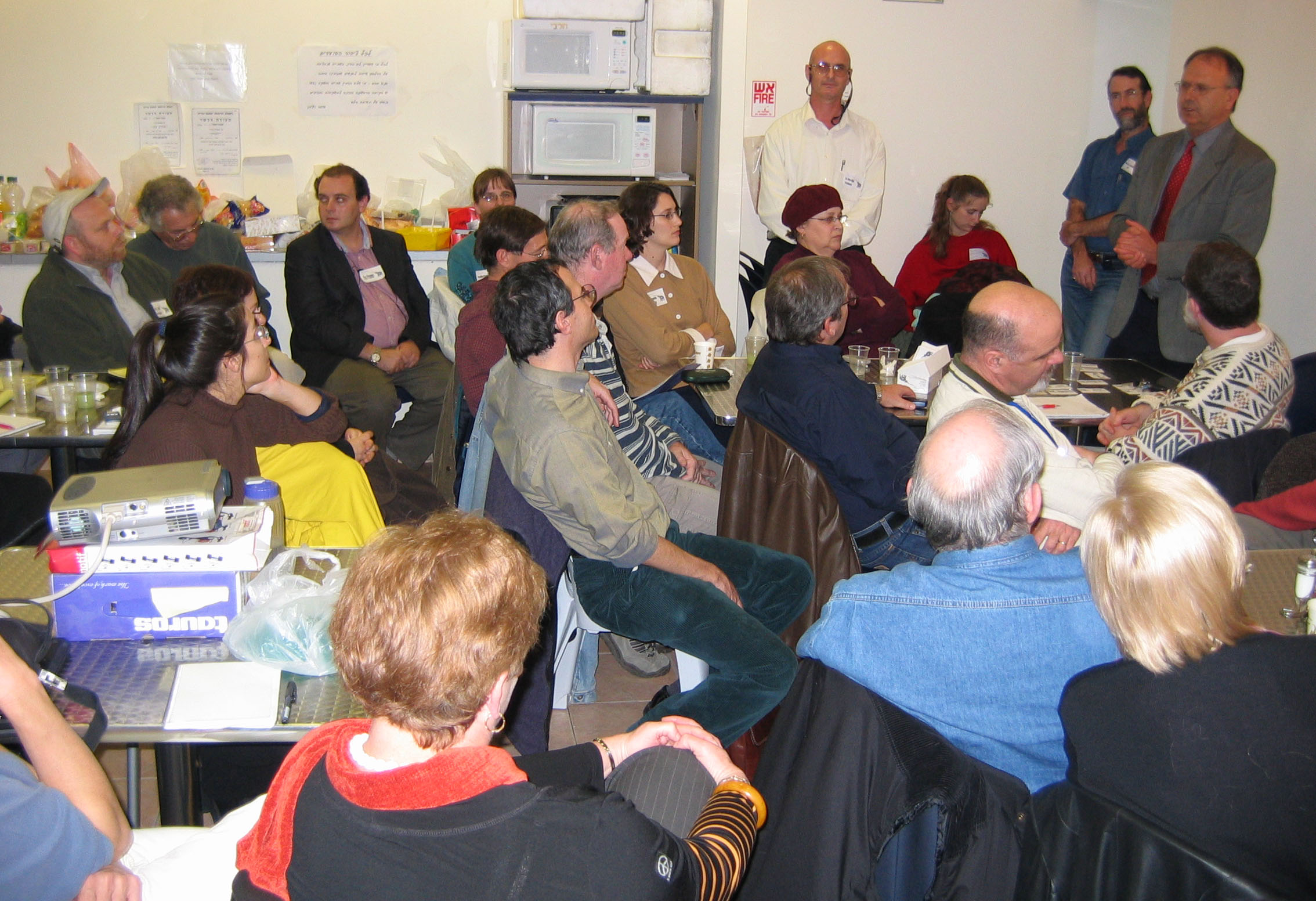
Former mayor Simon Alfassi speaks at convention of technical writers

In addition to technology-based industry, Yokneam has a number of production facilities, including Osem, which established a plant in Yokneam in 1974; and a boutique winery, Morad Winery, known for its special wines made from Pomegranates, Passion Fruit, Red Grapefruits, Coffee, Coconuts, Carub and many other fruits. Initially, the plant produced mainly pasta products, but the scope of activities broadened over the years. In 1997, the facility doubled in size and three production lines were installed for baked goods such as crackers, biscuits, cookies and pretzels. Bamba, a popular Israeli snack food, is also produced in Yokneam. Many Yokneam residents are employed at the plant, which won awards from the Council for a Beautiful Israel for its attractive premises.

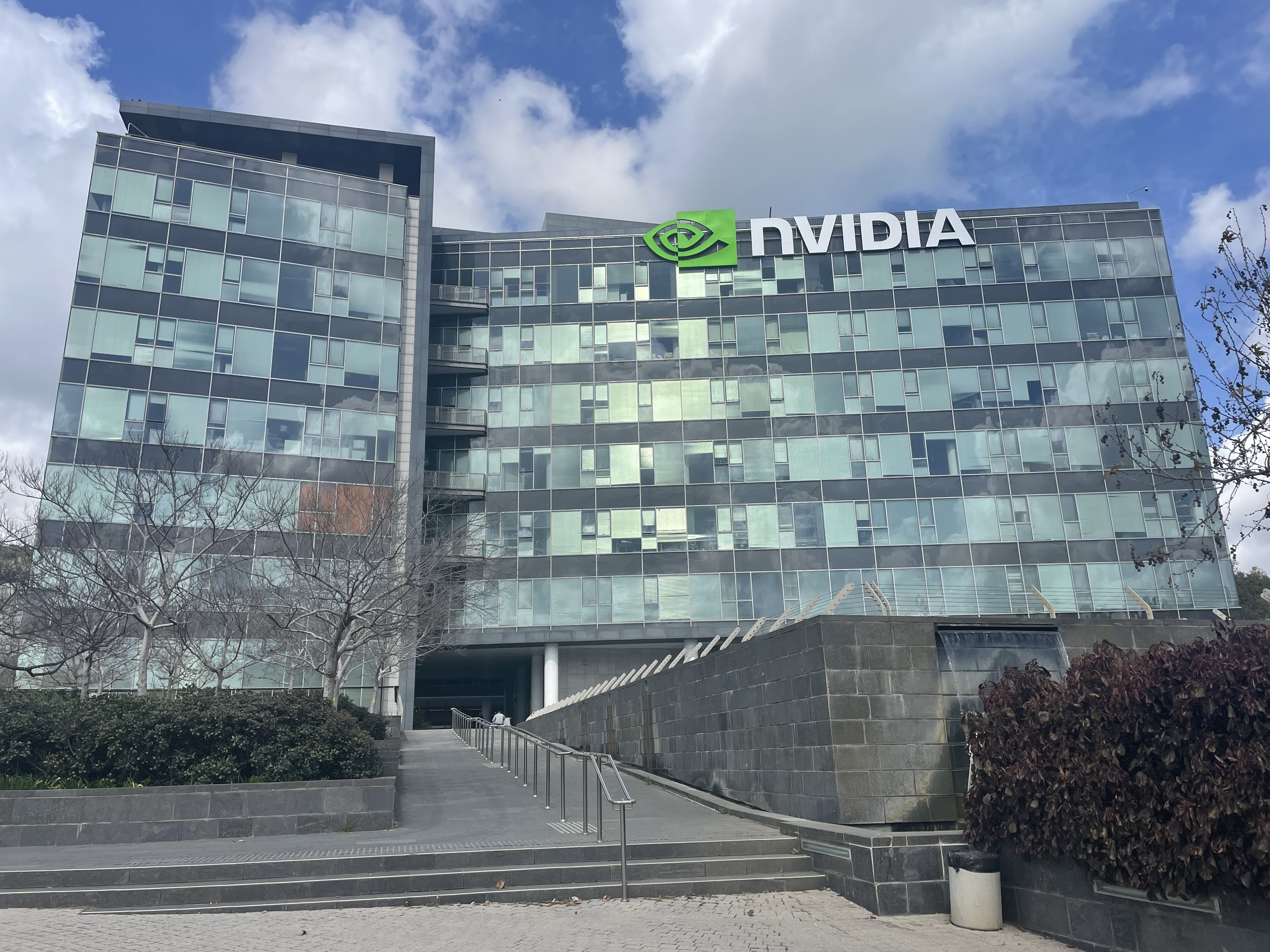
Nvidia, Yokneam

=== Companies with a significant R&D presence ===
Over a hundred high technology companies are headquartered in Yokneam or have R&D facilities there. These include:

- Advanced Dicing Technologies (ADT)
- Annapurna Labs
- Arad Technologies
- Argo Medical Technologies
- BATM Advanced Communications
- Biosense Webster
- BioDalia Microbiological Technologies
- Carestream Health
- CMT Medical Technologies
- EZchip Semiconductor
- Galil Medical
- Given Imaging
- High Sec Labs
- Intel
- Kaminaro
- Lumenis
- Marvell Technology Group
- Medtronic
- Mellanox Technologies
- Microbot Medical
- Mind CTI
- MRV Communications
- Naiot Venture Accelerator
- Nvidia
- Norav Medical
- NXP Semiconductors
- On Track Innovations
- Panasonic Avionics Corporation
- ReWalk
- SkySapience
- Solcon
- Surf Communication Solutions
- Synel
- Syneron Medical
- Telco Systems
- Zadara Storage

=== Startup exits ===
Major startup exits include BTG's recent $110 million acquisition of Galil Medical, Amazon's acquisition of Annapurna Labs for a reported $350–375 million and Mellanox Technologies acquisition of EZchip Semiconductor for a reported $811 million, Covidien's 2014 acquisition of Given Imaging for a reported $860 million, Intel's acquisition of Oplus Technologies Inc in 2005 for nearly $50 million, and Marvell's acquisition of Galileo Technology Ltd. for $2.7 billion in stock in 2000. In addition to these exits, Lumenis recently merged with an affiliate of China's XIO group for a reported $510 million.

=== Technology incubators ===
As the number of hi-tech companies in Yokneam grow, technology incubators have begun opening in or moving to Yokneam, each specializing in different types of technology.

== Parks and recreation ==
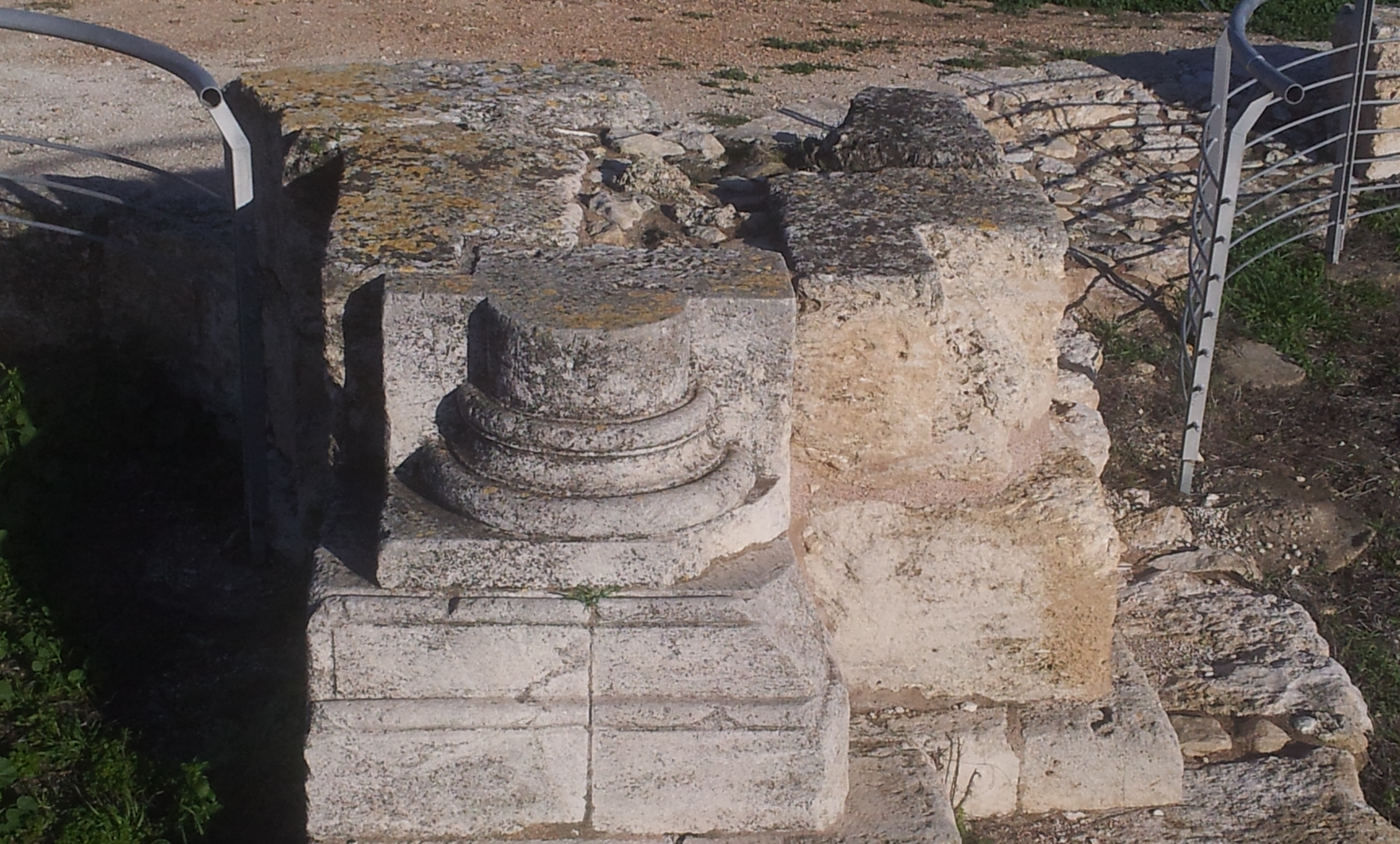
A pillar at Yokneam Illit

Yokneam is a very green city. Not just in terms of ecological activism, but also in terms of its physical surroundings. Roughly two-thirds of the land within Yokneam's city limits are green space (parks, archeological digs, gardens, playgrounds). It has five major public parks, and outdoor amphitheater and over 80 playgrounds distributed throughout the city. Tel Yokneam, which includes the ruins of a crusader church and its intricate water system, is used as an educational site where Yokneam's school children perform restoration work under the direction of the Antiquities Authority and the National Parks Authority. Nearly 13 kilometers of bicycle paths connect all of the parks and public spaces. The city is also surrounded by the Ramot Menashe Biosphere Reserve of the Megiddo Regional Council, which is currently in the process of becoming recognized by UNESCO as a biosphere reserve.

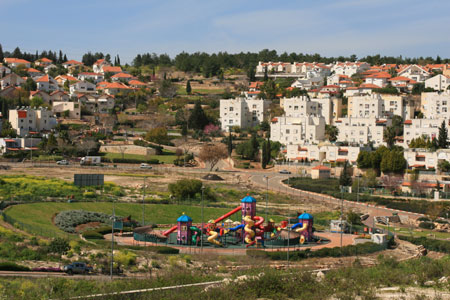
Yokneam City Park

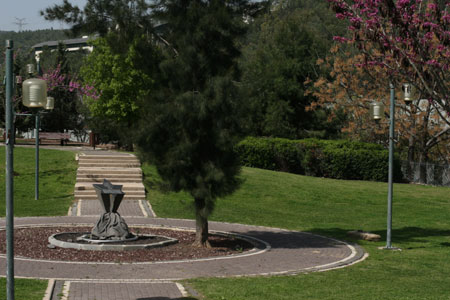
Gandi Park

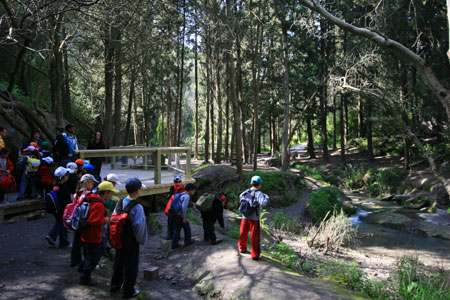
Nahal Shofet

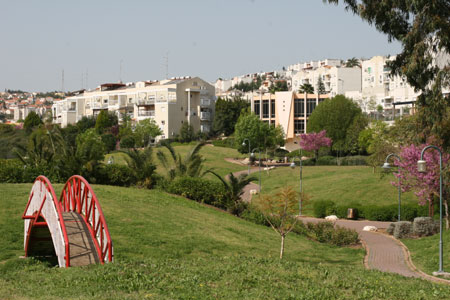
Nahal Keret Park

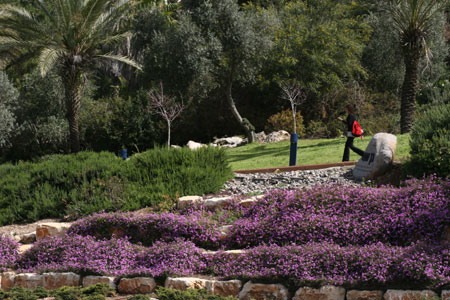
Walking through Metri Park

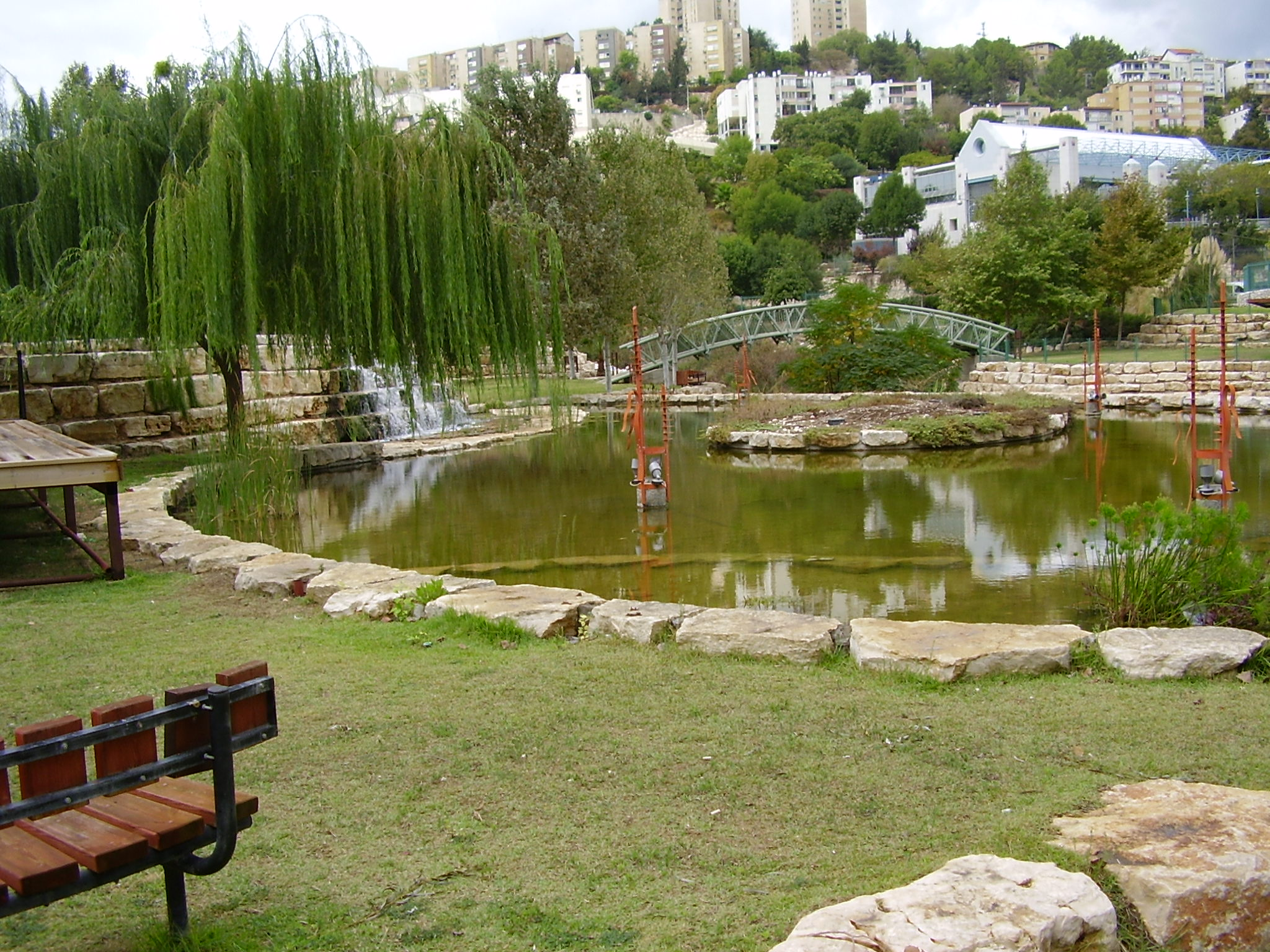
Nahal Keret Park

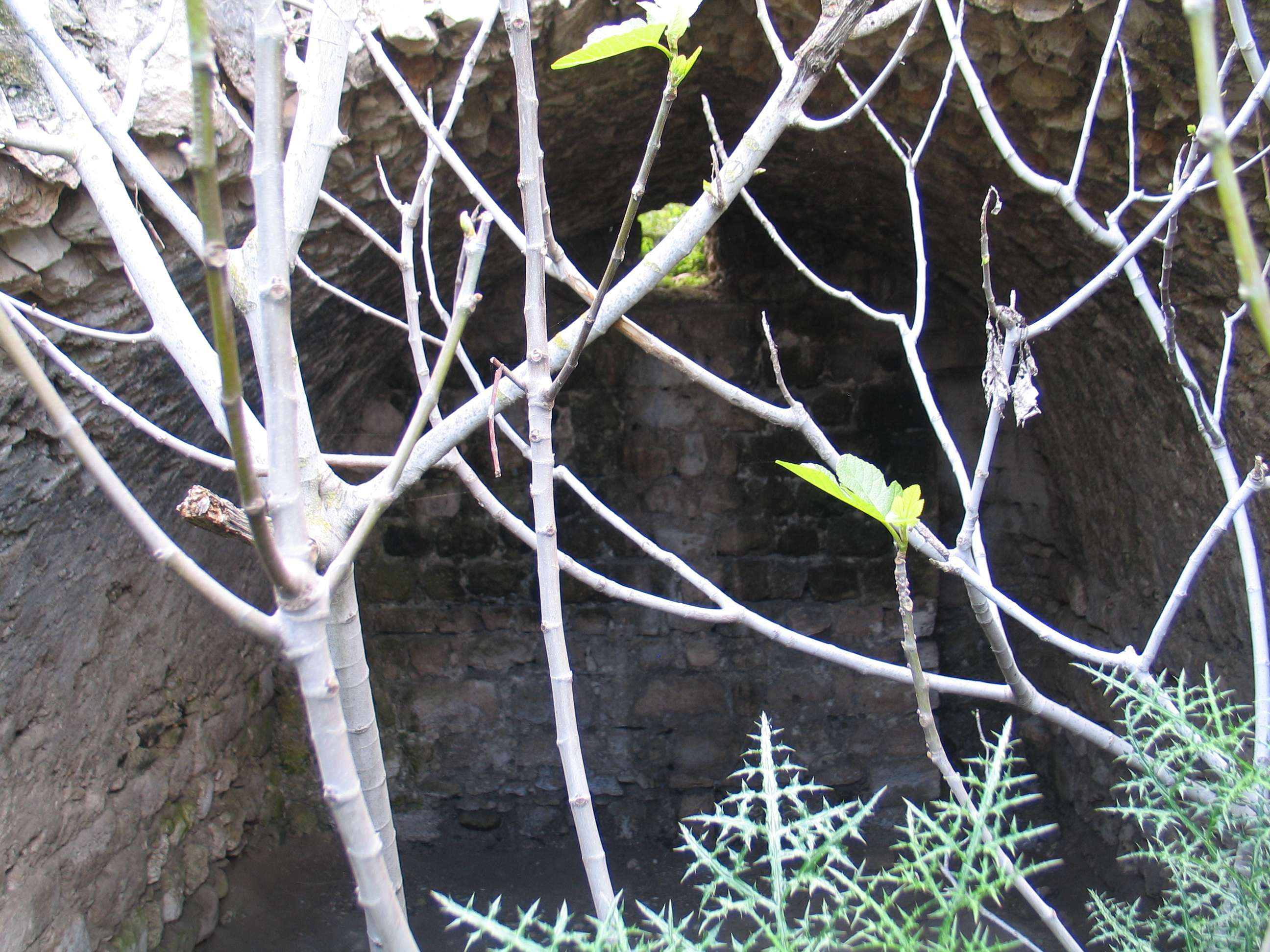
Tel Yokneam

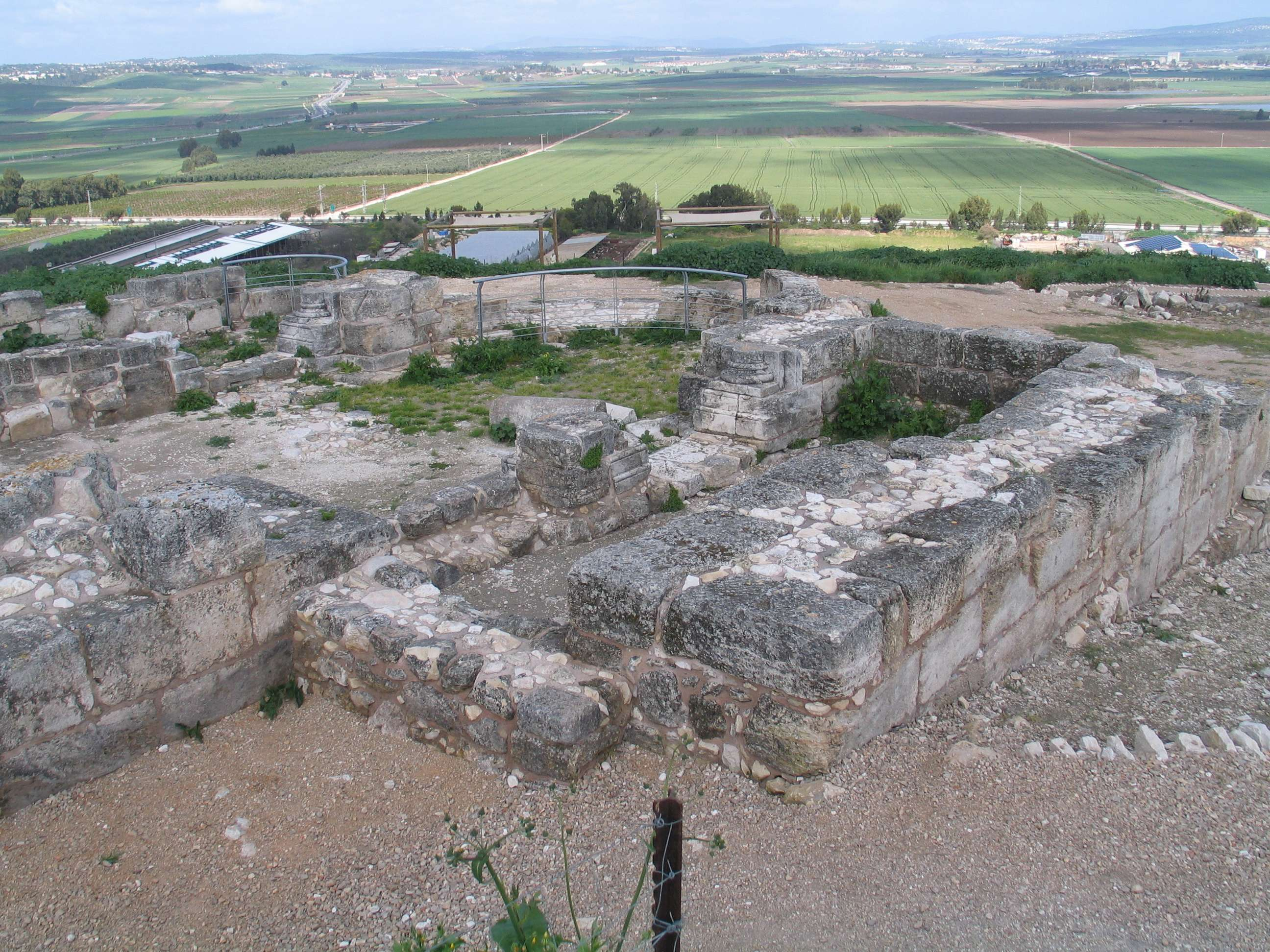
Tel Yokneam

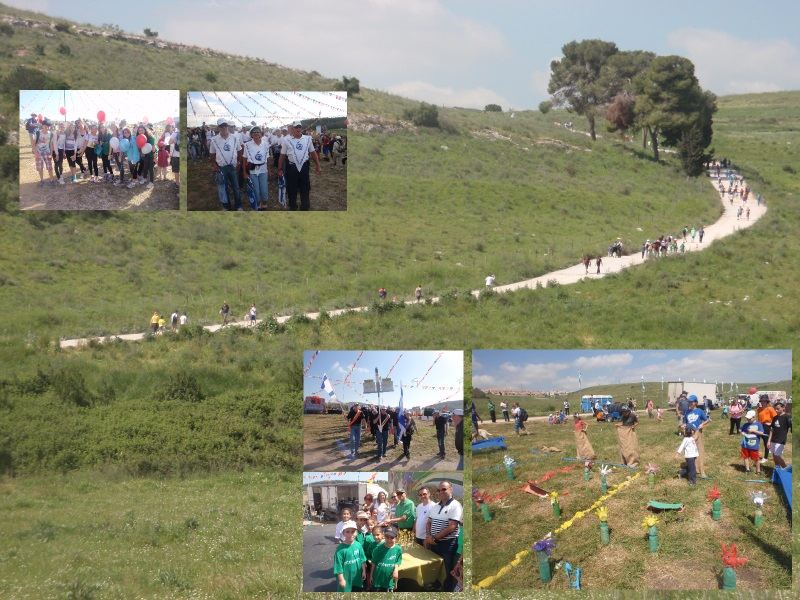
22nd Annual Yokneam Walk

Each year thousands of Israelis participate in Yokneam's annual walking event which began in 1991. In 2013 there were 35,000 participants. The event takes place in the Spring, with a short route of 6 km and a longer route of 11 km through the hills and valleys that surround Yokneam. The 2014 walking event is scheduled for April 17, 2014.

== Transportation ==
Yokneam sits at the intersections of Highway 70 and Highway 6, which connect all of Israel with both Tel Aviv and Jerusalem. One of the main stations of the new railway line, being in operation from 2016, from the Jordanian border to the port of Haifa is located only 5 minutes from the Yokneam's high-tech parks. Yokneam is 20–25 minutes from Haifa Airport and 12 minutes from the Ramat David airbase, which is reported to be the most likely location for a new International airport to complement Ben Gurion Airport.

The bus service in Yokneam is provided by 3 bus companies. Superbus provides the local service in Yokneam and intercity service to Haifa and Afula. Superbus also runs night lines (including Friday nights) to Haifa, Kiryat Tivon and Ramat Ishai. All bus stops are handicapped-accessible. Egged and Nateev Express provide express intercity services to Tel Aviv, Bnei Brak and Jerusalem, as well as service with stops along the way.

There is a taxi stand at the shopping mall at the eastern entrance to Yokneam Illit.

The Yokneam Illit Municipality encourages the use of bicycles in the city. It currently has 13 km of bicycle paths that connect all of it public parks and buildings.

== Education ==
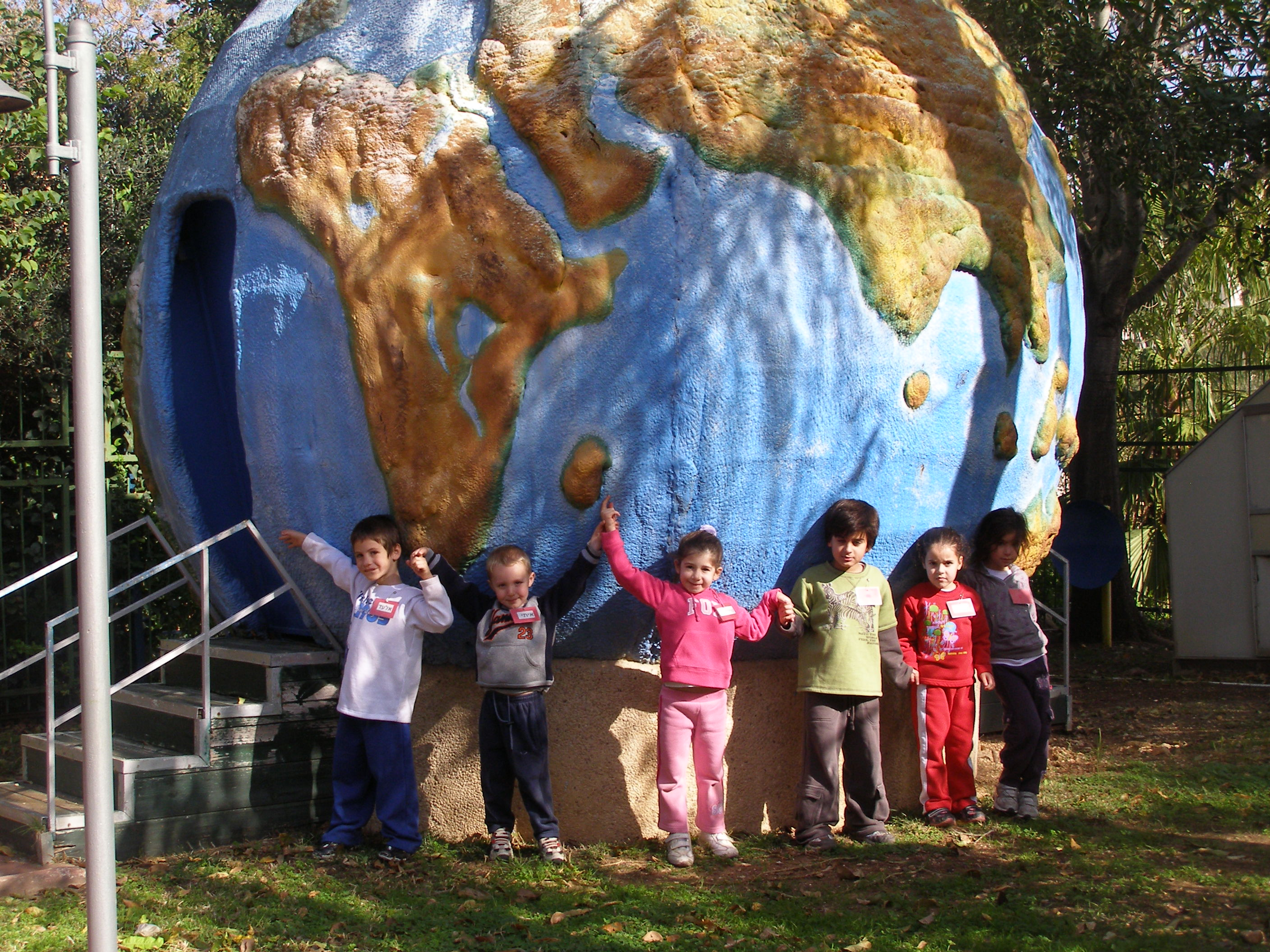
Yokneam Science Museum

Yokneam allocates 42% of its budget to education. With 75% of its students passing the national matriculation exams and a dropout rate of only 0.8%, Yokneam Illit was awarded the National Education Prize and the Regional Education Prize several times in recent years. Preschool from age 3 has been free in Yokneam Illit for 20 years.

The municipality of Yokneam has developed a special relationship with the Jewish communities of Atlanta, GA and Saint Louis, MO, whereby all three communities work together to create programs for bridging the gaps between communities and cultures, and to provide all students with equal opportunities.

The Environmental Protection Ministry (Israel) awarded a number of Yokneam's kindergartens and elementary schools the “green label” because of the way they integrated study of the environment into the local curriculum. In grades three through six, elementary school students spend a full week during school at the city's Science Museum.

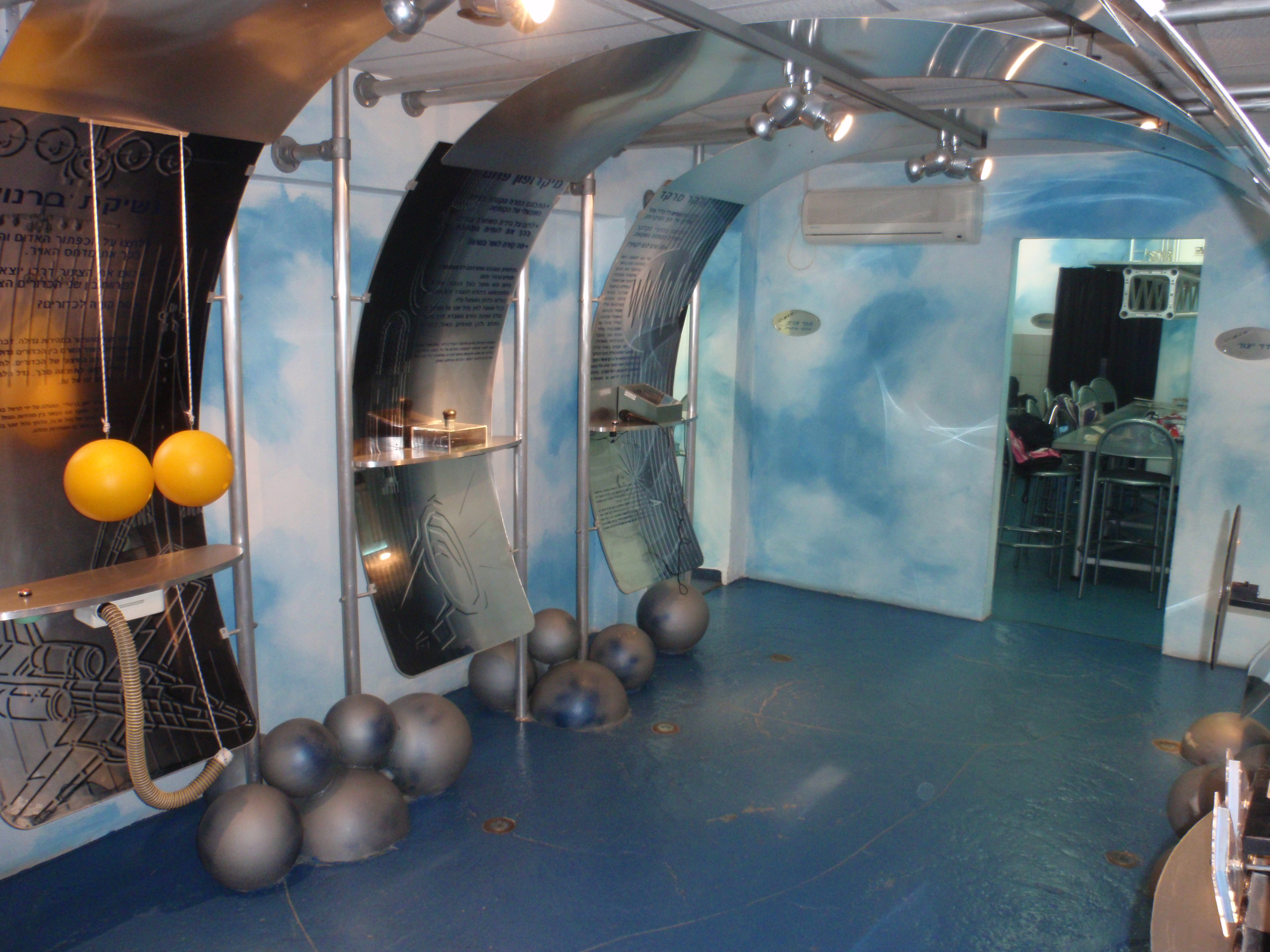
The Yokneam Media Museum

The IDF Head of Manpower Planning recently awarded the city a special excellence prize for achieving an 87% level of enlistment in the IDF and the eighth highest level of recruitment to elite units and officers courses in all of Israel.

Construction of a "breakthrough" educational campus is nearly complete, with an educational infrastructure for study from kindergarten to high school that will eliminate the transitions that affect students’ lives. The campus will have sports halls, day care centers, kindergartens, elementary and high schools, and academic courses prior to IDF enlistment.

In addition to Yokneam's proximity to Technion(23.8 km), University of Haifa(22 km), and Oranim Academic College(7.5 km), Yokneam has a branch of the Open University for bachelor's and master's degrees. The municipality is currently trying to expand on this by working with major universities to open branches in Yokneam.

== Culture ==
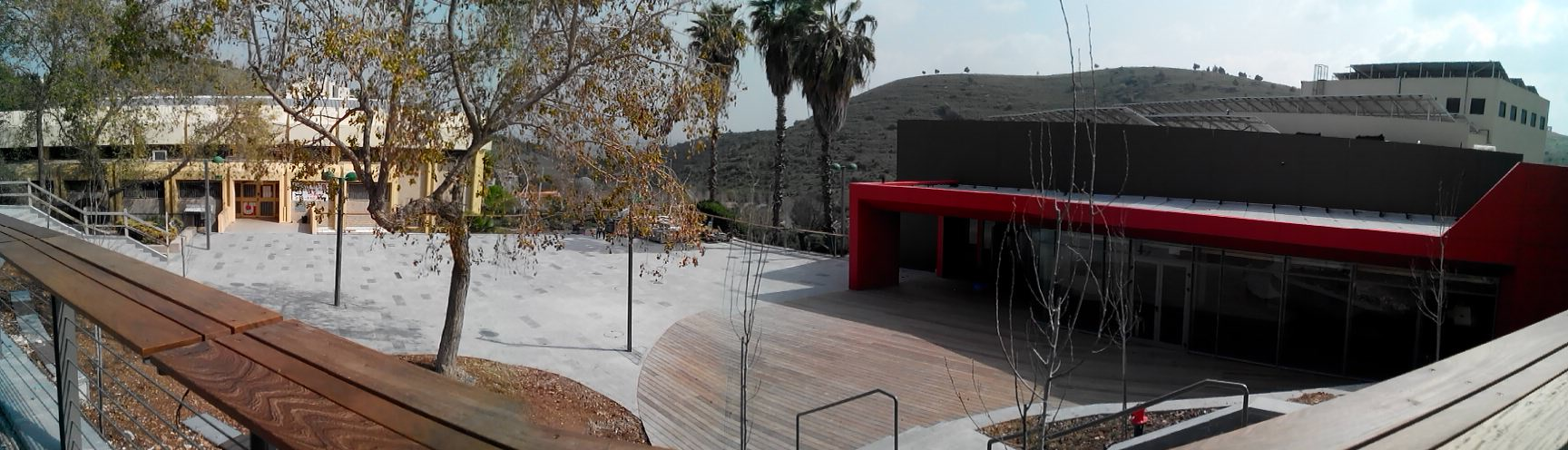
Entrance to the Yokneam City Theater (right)

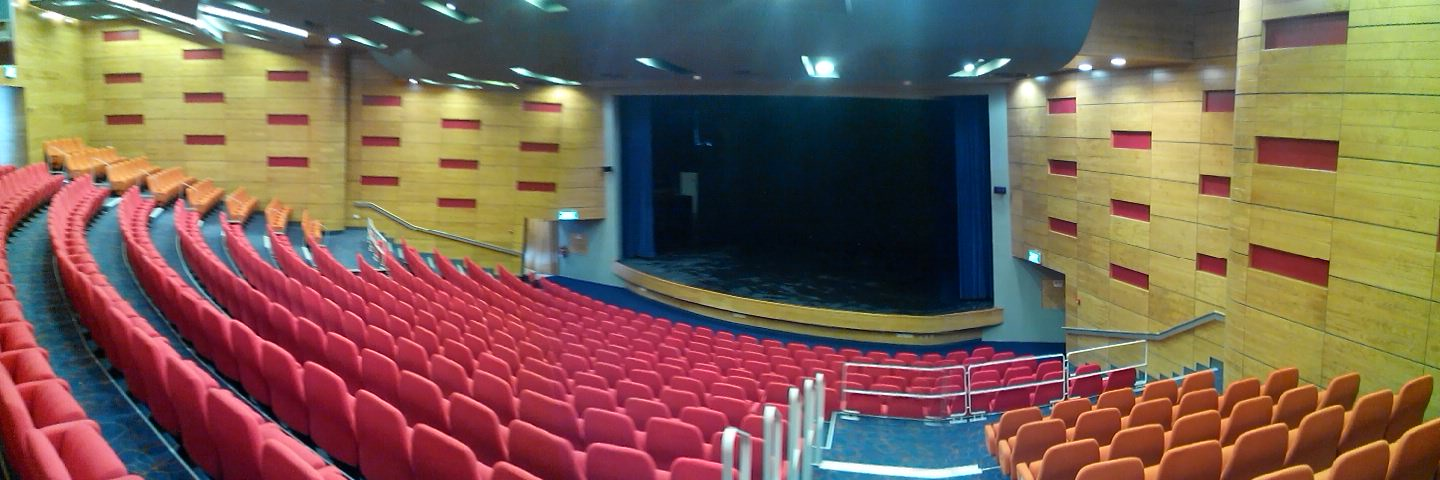
Inside the Yokneam City Theater

Residents of Yokneam Illit are avid theater goers and there are three local theaters, Yokneam City Theater (seats 475), Tarbuta (seats 200) and an amateur theater MixArt.

Israel's best-known theater groups come to perform at The Yokneam City Theater operates 6 days a week. The subscription series with 8 different performances a year from Israel's best-known theater companies has grown from one day of the week to five in order to accommodate a total audience of over 2,000, or 10% of its population. The theater also runs two subscription series for children with a total of 600 subscribers, one for ages 3–6 and the other for ages 6–10. A separate "Fringe" series has 200 subscribers for one-man or small theater companies and nontraditional theater performances. Low cost and subsidized performances that are outside of the subscription series include performances in Yiddish by the "Yiddish Shpiel" company, events for the Ethiopian community, children's concerts, and animation theater. The Jewish Federation subsidizes children's theater subscriptions for members of the Ethiopian community to bring their cost of a child accompanied by one parent down to 100 ILS (approximately US$30) for the entire series. The local Artists' Guild makes use of the theater to display artwork from local and outside artists.

A second theater house, Tarbuta, seats 200. The Family Empowerment Center also runs a Drama-Therapy group for Ethiopian women that performs in Hebrew and Amharic. During the summer months, musicians from all over Israel perform in the open air Amphitheater.

MixArt is an amateur studio established in 2017 under the patronage of Yokneam's Department of Absorption and performing plays in Russian and Hebrew. To date, this group does not have its own scene.

There are also many dance performances held at Kibbutz Ein HaShofet, just outside Yokneam. One of Israel's largest movie houses, Yes Planet, is only 15 minutes away.

Yokneam Illit does not have any bars or pubs. Young people looking for more than wine or beer at a restaurant or coffee shop go to nearby Ramat Ishai.

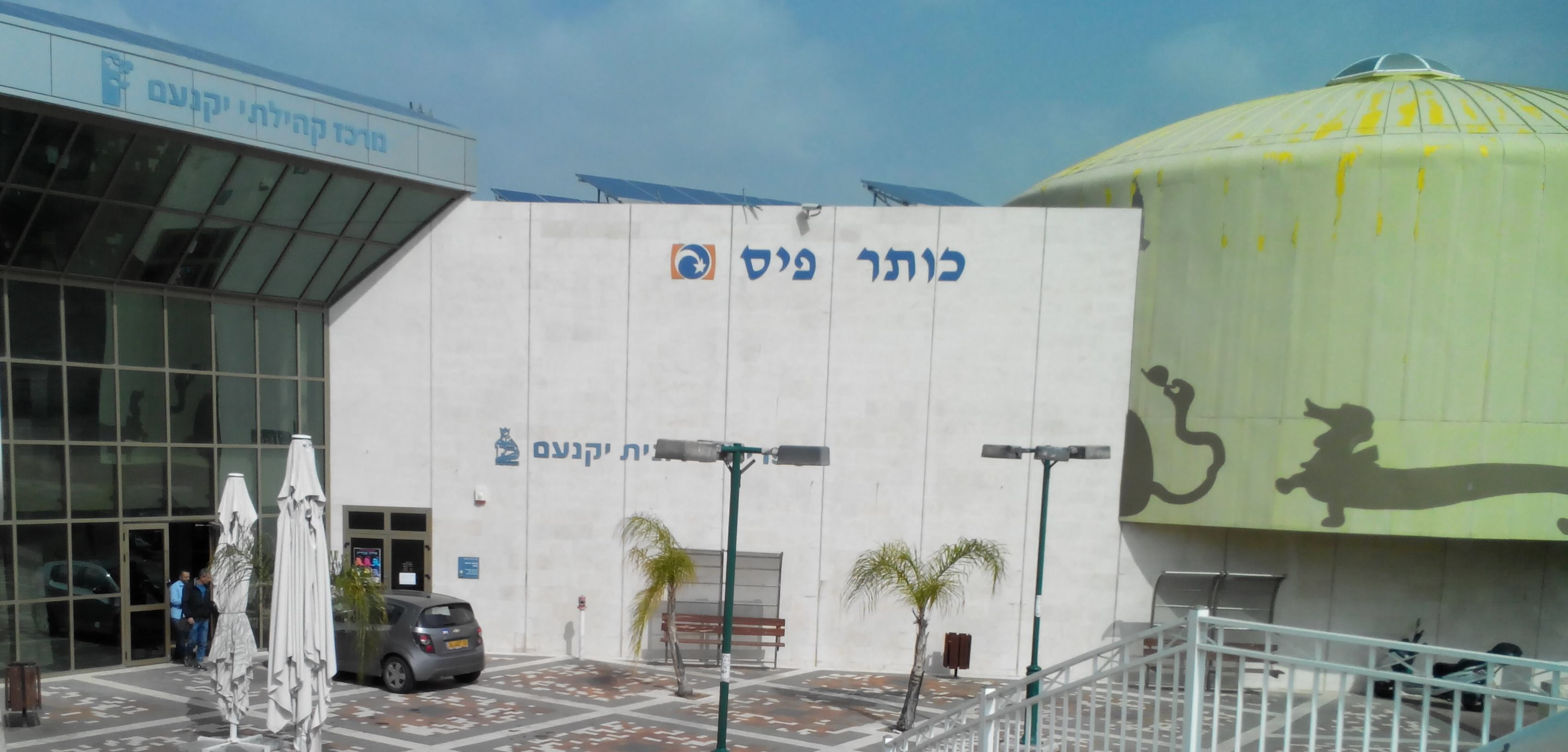
Yokneam City Library

== Religion ==
Yokneam is known for its religious tolerance, with many extended families consisting of a mixture of secular and religious Jews. Despite its small size, Yokneam Illit is an ethnically diverse city, with immigrants from all parts of the world and their descendants and many active synagogues, each with its own special character.

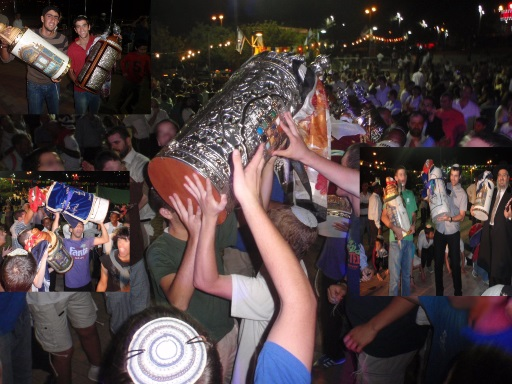
Celebrating Simchat Torah in Yokneam.

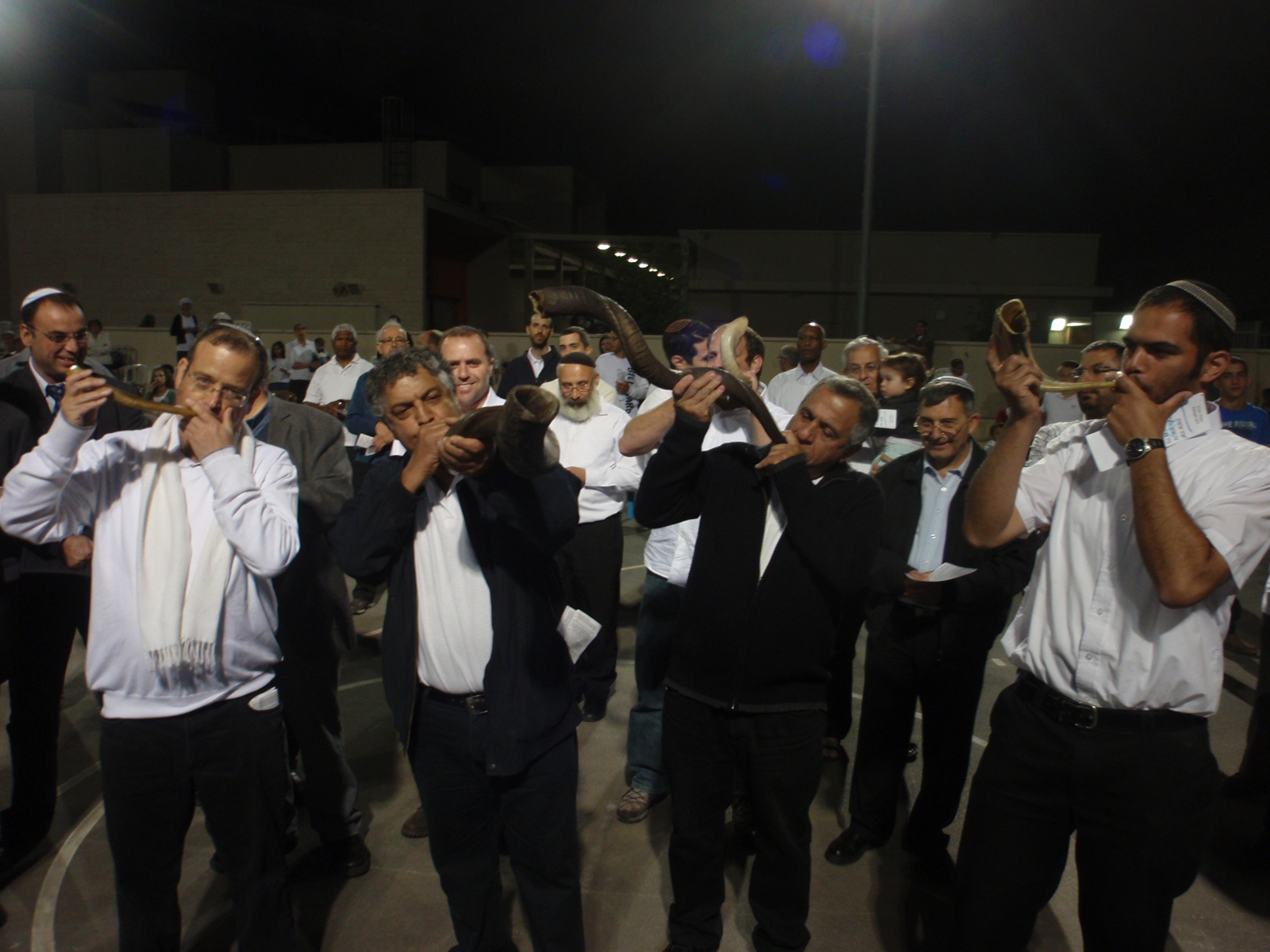
Blowing the Shofar on Israel Independence Day in Yokneam Illit

== Sports ==
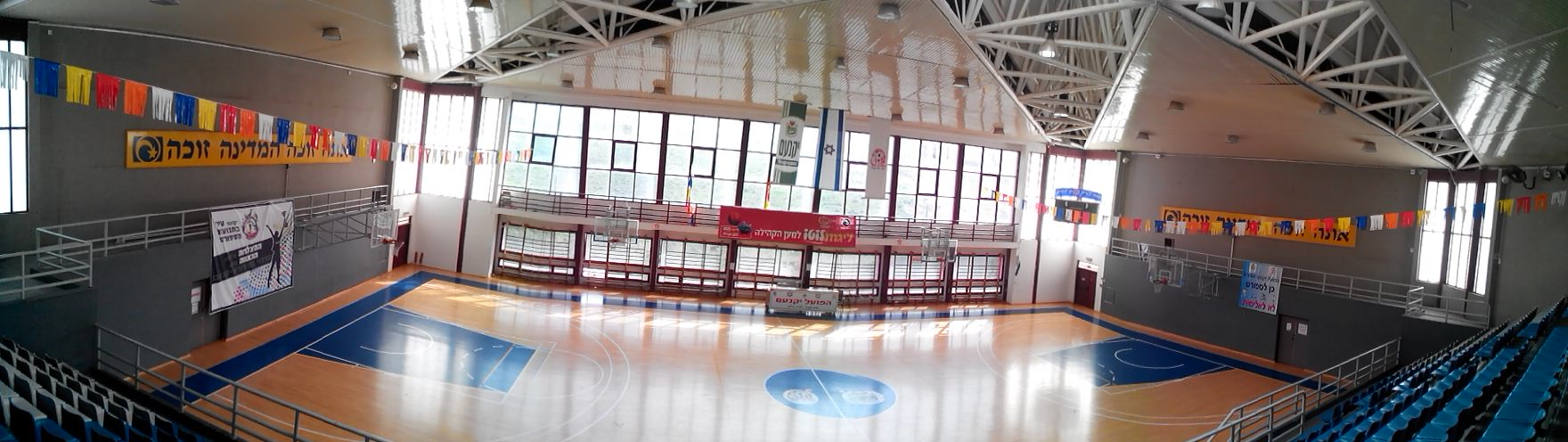
Hapoel Yokneam Indoor Basketball Courts (seats 500)

Yokneam has two indoor Basketball Courts (Dahari Sports Center and Hapoel Sports Center), a Tennis Association, a new Country Club including an indoor and outdoor swimming pool, an additional community swimming pool, and a Soccer field, which is run by the Hapoel sports association and is very active with the school age children. Local teams compete in league for Basketball, Soccer, Baseball, Water Polo on YouTube, and Bicycle Racing. The Indoor basketball court at Hapoel seats 500. The outdoor soccer field seats 200.

The Yokneam-Megiddo Region has two baseball teams that represent their Sister Cities (the Atlanta Braves and the St. Louis Cardinals). These teams have participated in many tournaments: Jr Macabbiah Games, European Tournaments and the Israeli Junior Olympics where they received the bronze medal. One of the local Kibutz' has donated the land necessary to build a new Baseball/Softball Stadium in conjunction with the Israel Softball Association and the Jewish National Fund. The Israel Softball Association is helping to start a Special Education Program for the families in the area. In 2012–2013, Yokneam had a player make the Junior National Team which traveled to Denmark that summer.

Starting in 2012, 12 youngsters from Daliyat al-Karmel began taking part in a weekly co-existence program at the Israel Tennis Center as part of a tennis school financed by the Freddie Krivine Foundation.

== Israel's first "Green City" ==
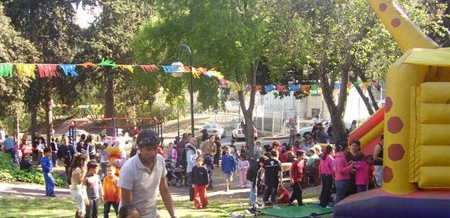
"Green Day" Festivities in Yokneam Illit

In 2009, the Cleantech Authority of the Environmental Protection Ministry (Israel) awarded the city of Yokneam Illit a prize for its overall strategy of protecting and nurturing green spaces and encouraging environmental awareness and education. It was again awarded the "Green City" prize in 2014, where the parameters measured included: energy efficiency, reduction of greenhouse gas emissions, recycling and waste separation, water and sewage, environment-friendly "green" construction, public gardens, environmental education, beauty of the city, environment-friendly "green" commerce and industry, care of urban public grounds and nature, and urban management.

The city has its own environmental protection committee responsible for defining and implementing an overall strategy for improving the quality of life and protecting the environment. The strategy emphasizes: planned development, environmental management, educational programs for environmental protection, urban sanitation, cause and effect management, and conservation of energy and water. It actively promotes walking and use of bicycles for transportation, and all bus stops are handicapped-accessible.

Yokneam Illit's 500 dunams of public parks and its 50 m^{2}/person of open urban space is 5 times the minimum recommendation for urban planning. In addition to the annual "Yokneam Walk", which attracts thousands of participants, the works closely with the Israel National Fund (Keren Kayemet) to further promote nature preservation.

Yokneam Illit is one of 31 municipalities that separates garbage at the source, as well as having waste separation centers distributed throughout the city. The drainage systems work well and stockpile water for reuse in city parks and gardens. The city also uses a computerized irrigation system to save water and achieve optimal results. Sewage is treated at the water treatment plants that are located in nearby Kiryat Tivon.

As part of Yokneam's commitment to adopting green energy it will soon be one of the first two cities in northern Israel where electric buses will operate.

The municipality invests both time and money to maintain the natural beauty of its green spaces. Its building codes have become stricter and greener as the demand for housing has increased. A "green" neighborhood is currently under construction which includes environment friendly lighting, irrigation and waste management. At the same time, the municipality has actively worked to make the older neighborhoods more attractive.

The city runs environmental leadership workshops. Jewish immigrants from Ethiopia run a program to teach and preserve traditional farming methods. The education system is defined as “green”, with environmental studies built into the curriculum.

== Municipal budget and fiscal management ==
Yokneam Municipality's policies stress savings and proper management. Over the years, it has won financial prizes for proper management, which have been invested in city employees and local improvement. The municipality has privatized a range of services including gardening, garbage collection, and rates collection, resulting in substantial savings for reinvestment. The city's annual budget of NIS 112 million is balanced and is collected from 95% of residents and 97% of businesses and industrial enterprises. The municipal budget for 2014 is 135,889,000.

Income	(in 1,000 ILS)	% of income	Expenses	(in 1,000 ILS)	% of budget
Property tax	63,700	47%	Salaries (General)	24,355	18%
Discounted property tax	5,665	4%	Activities (General)	28,590	21%
Late payment for water	100	less than 1%	Property tax discounts	5,200	4%
Independent income	12,231	9%	Water plant	105	less than 1%
Ministry of Education	37,432	28%	Salaries (Education)	15,892	12%
Ministry of Welfare	10,222	7%	Activities (Education)	38,021	28%
Gov't balance grant and special	5,322	4%	Salaries (Welfare)	4,640	3%
Dedicated grants	210	less than 1%	Activities (Welfare)	10,789	8%
Gov't income	1,007	1%	Loans (Principal)	7,322	5%
			Loans (Interest)	975	1%

== Media ==
There is one radio station, Radio Kol Rega 96.fm, and five local (Hebrew) newspapers that regularly cover news about Yokneam Illit.

- Ze Ma Yesh (That's What There Is)
- Kol Yokneam (Voice of Yokneam)
- Kochav Yizrael (Jezre'el [Valley] Star)
- Ha'Ir - Ratzui Ve'Matzui (The City - Wanted and Available)
- Index Hadashot (Index News)

== Climate ==
Yokneam averages 650 millimeters due to its proximity to Mount Carmel. The temperatures are the same as the other communities in the Jezre'el Valley. In winter, minimum temperatures typically range from 1 to 7 °C (34 to 45 °F). Temperatures can dip below 0 °C (32 °F) when cold winds come from the north with clear skies. Morning fog is common in Yokneam and throughout the Jezre'el Valley.

Summers in Yokneam are hot and dry, with maximum temperatures reaching 32 to 39 °C (90 to 102 °F). Since the introduction of weather station, the hottest recorded temperature was 40.3 °C (104.5 °F) that was measured on August 7, 2010; and the lowest recorded temperature was 0.3 °C (32.5 °F) on December 15, 2013.

Up to 50 cm. of snow fell in Yokneam Illit in 1950, 1992, 1999 and 2000.

Record rainfall in recent years: 2009-2010 552.9 mm (85% of average) 2010-2011 486.9 mm (75% of average) 2011-2012 575.8 mm (82% of average) 2012-2013 668.1 mm (103% of average)

== Voting Patterns ==
In the 2022 election, 49 percent of voters in Yokneam Illit voted for the parties of the center-left coalition led by Yair Lapid, while 48 percent voted for the parties of the right-wing coalition led by Benjamin Netanyahu and 0.1 percent voted for the Arab parties.

In the 2026 election, 50 percent of voters in Yokneam Illit voted for the parties of the center-left coalition led by Gadi Eisenkot, while 42 percent voted for the parties of the right-wing coalition led by Benjamin Netanyahu and 0.2 percent voted for the Arab parties. An additional 4.3 percent voted for the Reservists, and 2.5 percent voted for Amcha Yisrael. Voter turnout increased 20 percent from the 2022 election.

== Notable people ==
- Inbar Lanir (born 2000), world champion and Olympic judoka
- Usher Morgan (born 1985), film director, producer, publishing executive, and entrepreneur
- Leah Fadida (born 1968), Israeli politician and a former Knesset member

== Twin towns – sister cities ==
Yokneam Illit is twinned with:

- La Garenne-Colombes, France
- Lugo, Italy
- Mianyang, China
- Požega, Croatia
- San Pedro de Atacama, Chile
- Wiehl, Germany
- (United States) St. Louis, USA
- (United States) Atlanta, USA
- Oskemen, Kazakhstan

== See also ==
- Economy of Israel
- Silicon Wadi
