= On Track Innovations =

Company that develops contactless payment solutions

On Track Innovations Ltd.
- Traded as: OTCQX:OTIVF
- Industry: Payment system
- Founded: 1990; 36 years ago
- Headquarters: Yokneam, Israel
- Key people: Amir Eilam - CEO
- Products: contactless payment solutions
- Website: www.otiglobal.com

On Track Innovations Ltd. (OTI), founded in 1990, is a global company that focuses on creating contactless payment solutions. OTI does this through the use of NFC technologies.

OTI’s products include telemetry, payment readers, and terminals for unattended & self-service markets such as vending, entertainment, and other services.

OTI is headquartered in Yokneam Israel with offices in America, Europe, and Africa. The company retains an R&D site in Rosh Pinna Israel. OTI is traded on the QTCQX Global Market under the symbol OTIVF.

== History ==
In 1990, a group of engineers founded OTI with the intention of developing contactless payment technologies. The first few years were spent on chip design, with a focus on contactless antenna interfaces, integrated as RFID products that worked with files and ran security functionalities.

On Track Innovations was among the first companies in the world to come up with the contactless dual chip Combi Card secured smartcard solution that upgraded a smart contact only chip card into a smart contact and contactless chipcard.

OTI was one of the first companies to develop a contactless smartcard operating system. Utilizing dual chip technology and integrating these dual chips and an RF antenna into an inlay, it enabled the mass production of standard thin contact/contactless smart cards.

In 1996, OTI became a member of SC17-WG8, the committee that drafted the ISO/IEC 14443 (Proximity cards) and ISO15693 (Vicinity cards) standards. In 1999, OTI developed for Samsung a patented contactless technology for contact/contactless smart cards that enables contactless communication for microprocessor-based smart cards.

In 2002, OTI developed similar contactless technology as part of the Chinese national ID contactless cards project. This technology was upgraded to fully support the more advanced ISO14443 standard. In the same year, Mastercard decided to adapt the contactless technology for its smartcards, and OTI served as key advisor in developing their own Contactless card standard and conducting the first field trials of this technology. Visa followed with their VisaWay program. Then American Express and others followed.

In 2005 and 2006, the company was awarded a Company of the Year Award by Frost & Sullivan.

In 2007, OTI and STMicroelectronics introduced a fully certified product device which supports both MasterCard and Visa contactless programs on a single chip microprocessor-based smart card.

In the following years, OTI developed new technologies covered by multiple patents. These include patents for Smart Identification and Smart card readers, a patent for contactless smart stickers, a multiple antenna reading system, multi-application contactless smart cards, a patent for contactless smart SIM functionality retrofits, and others.

In 2016, OTI became one of the first non-Japanese companies to achieve FeliCa certification, as well as to achieve both EMV and FeliCa certifications.

== Subsidiaries ==
- OTI PetroSmart, a wholly owned subsidiary of OTI, was established in 2000 and is positioned as the exclusive Value Added Reseller of OTI’s Petroleum Products globally. EasyFuelPlus is OTI PetroSmart’s scalable automated fuel management and payment solution based on OTI’s contactless smart card technology platform.
- OTI America Inc.
- OTI Europa Sp.z.o.o.
