= Night bus lines in Israel =

The Night bus lines in Israel are a project of the Ministry of Transport, intended to supply safe and easy public transport to the night entertainment places, for normal bus fares, which operated since 2009.

The project started in the three biggest cities – Jerusalem, Tel Aviv and Haifa, and was later expanded to other cities – including Netanya, Herzliya, Rishon LeZion and Beersheba.

The night bus lines operate Thursday and Saturday nights, and during the summer every night except Friday, from midnight until 3 AM. In the north (Haifa, Yokneam Illit, Karmiel, Nazareth, Afula) the bus lines also operate Friday night.

The bus lines have the same fares as the daytime buses in the same areas – including the use of the Rav-Kav and the monthly passes.

== List of bus lines ==
- List of bus lines
