= BATM =

BATM Advanced Communications Ltd.
- Type: Public
- Traded as: LSE: BVC
- Industry: Communication systems, Medical devices
- Founded: 1992; 34 years ago
- Headquarters: Mansfield, Massachusetts, USA, Kfar Netter, Israel
- Key people: Zvi Marom CEO
- Products: Broadband networks Solutions, Fibre optic networking, Medical diagnostic solutions, Video recording
- Revenue: ▲US$ 134.4 million (2008)
- Operating income: ▲$ 24.4 million (2008)
- Net income: ▲$ 24.0 million (2008)
- Number of employees: 450 (2008)
- Subsidiaries: Telco Systems, Vigilant Technology, Resolute Networks
- Website: www.batm.com

BATM Advanced Communications Ltd. (Baras Advanced Technologies Marom) is a technology company principally engaged in development, production and marketing of data and telecommunication products in the field of local and wide area networks, as well as the development, production and distribution of laboratory diagnostic equipment in the medical sector. The company is listed on the London Stock Exchange and is a constituent of the FTSE techMARK 100 Index.

== History ==
BATM Advanced Communications was founded in 1992 by Dr. Zvi Marom and Greshon Baras as a bootstrap that grew into a multinational technology corporation; Initially focusing on developing high-performance communications equipment, mainly fibre optic networking, multiservice transport, access solutions, and integrated voice, video and data service.

Between August 1999 and 2002 Benjamin Netanyahu served as a senior consultant for the company (after he left politics following his defeat in the 1999 Israeli general election).

=== Acquisitions ===
- In April 2000, BATM acquired Telco Systems (founded in 1972) for $260.8 million in cash and 960,000 shares of BATM stock.
- In January 2008, BATM acquired Resolute Networks, itself established in 2004 as a merger of Redux Communications (founded in 1999) and Lycium Networks (founded in 2001). Resolute Networks is a provider of sub-system solutions for Circuit Emulation Services (CES) and Synchronous optical networking solutions.
- During 2008, BATM made a number of investments in medical devices and supporting distribution networks, acquiring a clinical chemistry diagnostic company based in Italy.
- In November 2008, the Company completed the acquisition of Vigilant Technology that provided video security systems such as digital recording systems, video content analysis and control centers used in airports, governmental sites, financial institutions, correctional facilities, casinos, and city centers. In 2014, Vigilant was dissolved.

== Telco Systems ==
Telco Systems, a BATM Company
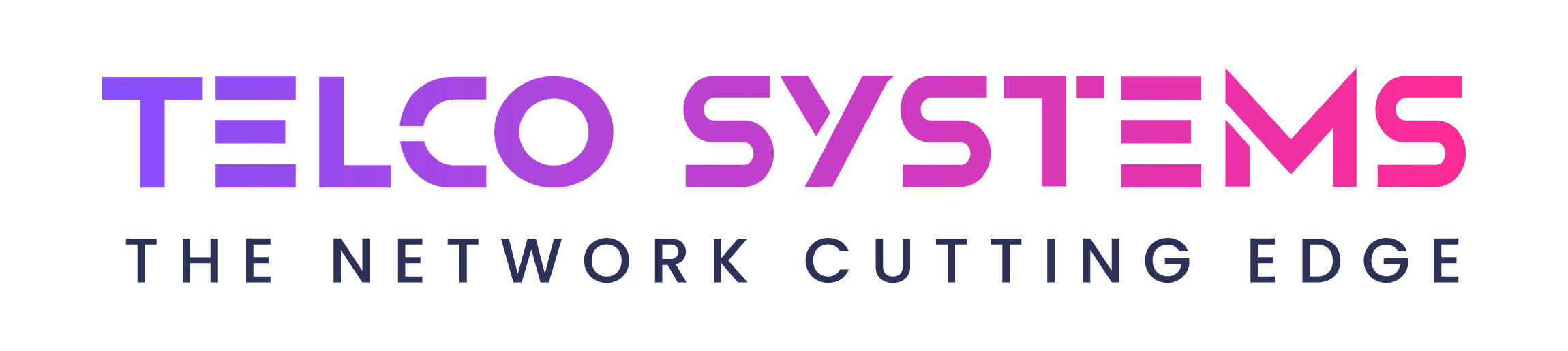
- Industry: Telecommunications equipment
- Founded: 1972
- Headquarters: Mansfield, Massachusetts, United States
- Area served: Worldwide
- Key people: Ariel Efrati - Telco Systems CEO and BATM COO
- Products: Edgility (Edge Computing), Carrier Ethernet, Mobile Backhaul, MPLS, Cloud networking, ATCA, Network management
- Website: www.telco.com

Telco Systems is a manufacturer of telecommunications equipment, founded in 1972, headquartered in Mansfield, Massachusetts, and acquired by BATM in 2000. Telco Systems solutions focuses around four primary vertical markets—carrier cloud networking and cloud services, business Ethernet services, mobile backhaul and AdvancedTCA (ATCA) switching blades.

=== History ===
In April 2000, BATM Advanced Communications acquired Telco Systems for $260.8 million in cash and 960,000 shares of BATM stock. As a wholly owned subsidiary of BATM Advanced Communications, the company now has over 400 engineers and scientists through BATM's integrated research and development program between all its subsidiary companies. Since its founding in 1992, BATM has been involved in the design and manufacture of equipment for the telecommunications industry.

Headquartered in Mansfield, MA, and Yokneam, Israel, Telco Systems has offices throughout the world including the United States, Germany, France, Singapore, and Australia.

=== Acquisitions of Telco Systems ===
- ANDA Networks
- Multiplexer product line from Charles Industries
- Resolute Networks
- Metrobility Optical Systems
- Integral Access

=== Awards for Telco Systems ===
- Best Unique Customer Application (T-Metro 8006)
- Broadband Communities (BBC) Magazine "Top 100" 2012
- Best Carrier Ethernet Demarcation Product EMEA 2011
- Best AdvanceTCA Software Product (T-ATCA404 BINOX)
- Cybersecurity Excellence Award 2017 (NFV CyberGuard)

== Financial performance ==
Year to 31 Dec	Revenue (US $m)	EBIT (US $m)	Net profit (US $m)
2008	134.462	23.860	24.459
2007	96.952	16.603	20.097

== See also ==
- Telco Systems
