= List of secretaries of state of Texas =

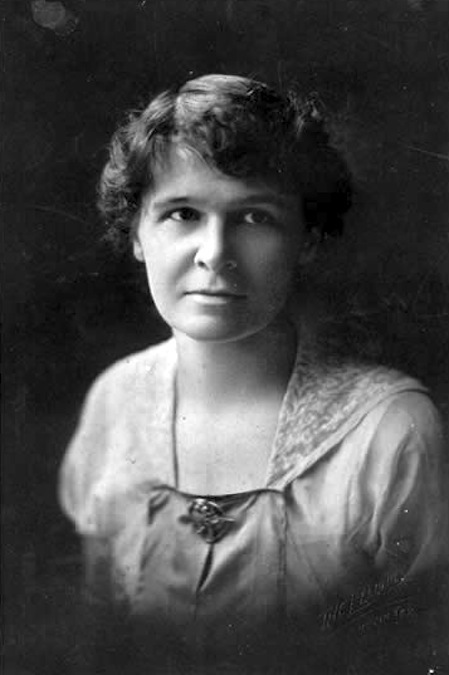
Jane Y. McCallum served as Secretary of State of Texas from 1927 to 1933, the longest term of office.

The following is a list of secretaries of state of Texas for both the Republic of Texas and the State of Texas.

== List of secretaries of state ==
=== Republic of Texas (1836–1846) ===
Name	Term	Appointed by
Samuel Price Carson	March 18, 1836 – April 29, 1836	David G. Burnet
James Collinsworth	April 29, 1836 – May 23, 1836	David G. Burnet
William Houston Jack	May 23, 1836 – October 22, 1836	David G. Burnet
Stephen F. Austin	October 22, 1836 – December 27, 1836	Sam Houston
James Pinckney Henderson	1837	Sam Houston
Robert Anderson Irion	1837–1838	Sam Houston
T. H. Bowman	1838	Sam Houston
Barnard E. Bee Sr.	December 16, 1838 – February 6, 1839	Mirabeau B. Lamar
James Webb	February 6, 1839 – May 31, 1839	Mirabeau B. Lamar
David G. Burnet (acting)	May 31, 1839 – July 23, 1839	Mirabeau B. Lamar
Nathaniel Amory (acting)	July 23, 1839 – August 5, 1839	Mirabeau B. Lamar
David G. Burnet (acting)	August 5, 1839 – January 31, 1840	Mirabeau B. Lamar
Abner Smith Lipscomb	January 31, 1840 – January 22, 1841	Mirabeau B. Lamar
Joseph Waples (acting)	January 23, 1841 – February 8, 1841	Mirabeau B. Lamar
James S. Mayfield (acting)	February 8, 1841 – April 30, 1841	Mirabeau B. Lamar
Joseph Waples	April 30, 1841 – May 25, 1841	Mirabeau B. Lamar
Samuel A. Roberts (acting)	May 25, 1841 – December 13, 1841	Mirabeau B. Lamar
Anson Jones	December 13, 1841 – December 10, 1844	Sam Houston
Ebenezer Allen	December 10, 1844 – February 5, 1845	Anson Jones
Ashbel Smith	February 5, 1845 – March 31, 1845	Anson Jones
Ebenezer Allen	March 31, 1845 – February 19, 1846	Anson Jones

=== State of Texas (1846–present) ===
Image	Name	Term	Appointed by
	Charles Mariner	February 20, 1846 – May 4, 1846	James Pinckney Henderson
	David G. Burnet	May 4, 1846 – January 1, 1848	James Pinckney Henderson
	Washington D. Miller	January 1, 1848 – January 2, 1850	George Tyler Wood
	James Webb	January 2, 1850 – November 14, 1851	Peter Hansborough Bell
	Thomas H. Duval	November 14, 1851 – December 22, 1853	Peter Hansborough Bell
	Edward Clark	December 22, 1853 – December 21, 1857	Elisha M. Pease
	Thomas Scott Anderson	December 22, 1857 – December 27, 1859	Hardin Richard Runnels
	Eber Worthington Cave	December 27, 1859 – March 16, 1861	Sam Houston
	Bird Holland	March 16, 1861 – November 7, 1861	Edward Clark
	Charles S. West	November 7, 1861 – September, 1862	Francis Lubbock
	Robert J. Townes	September, 1862 – May 2, 1865	Pendleton Murrah
	Charles R. Pryor	May 2, 1865 – August 9, 1865	Pendleton Murrah
	James H. Bell	August 9, 1865 – August, 1866	James W. Throckmorton
	John A. Green	August, 1866 – August 8, 1867	James W. Throckmorton
	D. W. C. Phillips	August 8, 1867 – January 1, 1870	Pendleton Murrah
	James Pearson Newcomb	January 1, 1870 – January 17, 1874	Edmund J. Davis
	George W. Clark	January 17, 1874 – January 27, 1874	Richard Coke
	Alfred Wesley DeBerry	January 27, 1874 – December 7, 1876	Richard Coke
	A. J. Searcy	December 7, 1876 – January 23, 1879	Richard B. Hubbard
	John D. Templeton	January 23, 1879 – January 22, 1881	Oran Milo Roberts
	Thorton Hardie Bowman	January 22, 1881 – January 18, 1883	Oran Milo Roberts
	Joseph Wilson Baines	January 18, 1883 – January 21, 1887	John Ireland
	John Marks Moore	January 21, 1887 – January 22, 1891	Sul Ross
	George W. Smith	January 22, 1891 – January 17, 1895	Jim Hogg
	Allison Mayfield	January 18, 1895 – January 5, 1897	Charles Allen Culberson
	J. W. Madden	January 5, 1897 – January 18, 1899	Charles Allen Culberson
	D. H. Hardy	January 19, 1899 – January 19, 1901	Joseph D. Sayers
	John G. Tod	January 19, 1901 – January 20, 1903	Joseph D. Sayers
	J. R. Curl	January 20, 1903 – April, 1905	S. W. T. Lanham
	O. K. Shannon	April, 1905 – January 19, 1907	S. W. T. Lanham
	L. Travis Dashiell	January 19, 1907 – February, 1908	Thomas Mitchell Campbell
	William Richardson Davie	February, 1908 – January 19, 1909	Thomas Mitchell Campbell
	W. B. Townsend	January 19, 1909 – January 19, 1911	Thomas Mitchell Campbell
	C. C. McDonald	January 19, 1911 – December, 1912	Oscar Branch Colquitt
	John Tibaut Bowman	December, 1912 – January, 1913	Oscar Branch Colquitt
	John L. Wortham	January, 1913 – June, 1913	Oscar Branch Colquitt
	Ferdinand C. Weinert	June, 1913 – November, 1914	Oscar Branch Colquitt
	D. A. Gregg	November, 1914 – January, 1915	Oscar Branch Colquitt
	John G. McKay	January, 1915 – December, 1916	James E. Ferguson
	C. J. Bartlett	December, 1916 – November, 1917	William P. Hobby
	George F. Howard	November, 1917 – November, 1920	William P. Hobby
	Charles D. Mims	November, 1920 – January 19, 1921	William P. Hobby
	S. L. Staples	January 19, 1921 – August, 1924	Pat Morris Neff
	J. D. Strickland	September, 1924 – January 1, 1925	Pat Morris Neff
	Henry Hutchings	January 1, 1925 – January 20, 1925	Pat Morris Neff
	Emma Grigsby Meharg	January 20, 1925 – January 17, 1927	Miriam A. Ferguson
	Jane Y. McCallum	January 17, 1927 – January 17, 1933	Dan Moody
	W. W. Heath	January 17, 1933 – January 15, 1935	Miriam A. Ferguson
	Gerald Mann	January 15, 1935 – August 31, 1935	James V. Allred
	R. B. Stanford	August 31, 1935 – August, 1936	James V. Allred
	Boles P. Matocha	August, 1936 – January 17, 1937	James V. Allred
	Edward A. Clark	January 17, 1937 – January 17, 1939	James V. Allred
	Tom Beauchamp	January 17, 1939 – October, 1939	W. Lee O'Daniel
	M. O. Flowers	October, 1939 – January, 1941	W. Lee O'Daniel
	William J. Lawson	January, 1941 – January, 1943	Coke R. Stevenson
	Sidney Latham	January, 1943 – February, 1945	Coke R. Stevenson
	Claude M. Isbell	February, 1945 – January 21, 1947	Coke R. Stevenson
	Paul H. Brown	January 21, 1947 – January 19, 1949	Beauford H. Jester
	Ben Ramsey	January 19, 1949 – February 9, 1950	Beauford H. Jester
	John Ben Shepperd	February 9, 1950 – April 30, 1952	Allan Shivers
	Andrew Jackson Ross	April 30, 1952 – January 9, 1953	Allan Shivers
	Howard A. Carney	January 9, 1953 – May 1, 1954	Allan Shivers
	C. E. Fulgham	May 1, 1954 – January 21, 1955	Allan Shivers
	Al Muldrow	January 21, 1955 – November 1, 1955	Allan Shivers
	Thomas Morrow Reavley	November 1, 1955 – January 16, 1957	Allan Shivers
	Zollie Steakley	January 16, 1957 – January 2, 1962	Price Daniel
	P. Frank Lake	January 2, 1962 – January 15, 1963	Price Daniel
	Crawford Martin	January 15, 1963 – March 12, 1966	John Connally
	John Hill	March 12, 1966 – January 22, 1968	John Connally
	Roy R. Barrera Sr.	March 7, 1968 – January 23, 1969	John Connally
	Martin Dies Jr.	January 23, 1969 – September 1, 1971	Preston Smith
	Bob Bullock	September 1, 1971 – January 2, 1973	Preston Smith
	V. Larry Teaver Jr.	January 2–19, 1973	Preston Smith
	Mark White	January 19, 1973 – October 27, 1977	Dolph Briscoe
	Steven C. Oaks	October 27, 1977 – January 16, 1979	Dolph Briscoe
	George Strake Jr.	January 16, 1979 – October 6, 1981	Bill Clements
	David Dean	October 22, 1981 – January 18, 1983	Bill Clements
	John Fainter	January 18, 1983 – July 31, 1984	Mark White
	Myra McDaniel	September 6, 1984 – January 26, 1987	Mark White
	Jack Rains	January 26, 1987 – June 15, 1989	Bill Clements
	George Bayoud	June 15, 1989 – January 15, 1991	Bill Clements
	John H. Hannah Jr.	April 15, 1991 – March, 1994	Ann Richards
	Ron Kirk	April 4, 1994 – January 17, 1995	Ann Richards
	Tony Garza	January 17, 1995 – December 31, 1997	George W. Bush
	Alberto Gonzales	January 1, 1998 – January 3, 1999	George W. Bush
	Elton Bomer	January 11, 1999 – December 31, 2000	George W. Bush
	Henry Cuellar	January 2, 2001 – October 5, 2001	Rick Perry
	Geoff Connor acting	October 5, 2001 – January 7, 2002	Rick Perry
	Gwyn Shea	January 7, 2002 – August 4, 2003	Rick Perry
	Geoff Connor	September 26, 2003 – December, 2004	Rick Perry
	Roger Williams	January, 2005 – July 1, 2007	Rick Perry
	Phil Wilson	July 1, 2007 – July 6, 2008	Rick Perry
	Esperanza Andrade	July 23, 2008 – November 23, 2012	Rick Perry
	John Steen	November 27, 2012 – 2013	Rick Perry
	Nandita Berry	January 7, 2014 – January 20, 2015	Rick Perry
	Carlos Cascos	January 21, 2015 – January 6, 2017	Greg Abbott
	Rolando Pablos	January 6, 2017 – December 15, 2018	Greg Abbott
	David Whitley	December 17, 2018 – May 27, 2019	Greg Abbott
	Ruth R. Hughs	August 19, 2019 – May 31, 2021	Greg Abbott
	John B. Scott	October 21, 2021 – December 31, 2022	Greg Abbott
	Jane Nelson	January 5, 2023 – July 17, 2026	Greg Abbott
	Robert Howden acting	July 18, 2026 – Present	Greg Abbott
