= Senator Weinert =

Senator Weinert may refer to:

- Ferdinand C. Weinert (1853–1939), Texas State Senate
- Rudolph A. Weinert (1894–1974), Texas State Senate
