= George W. Strake =

American businessman (1894–1969)

- Born: George William Strake; November 9, 1894; St. Louis, Missouri, U.S.
- Died: August 6, 1969 (aged 74); Houston, Texas, U.S.
- Occupation: Businessman
- Children: 3; including George Jr.

George William Strake (November 9, 1894 – August 6, 1969) was an American oilman. His fortune was estimated at between $100 million and $200 million. In 1957, Strake was included in Fortune magazine's list of the seventy-six richest Americans.

A major benefactor of the Catholic Church in the United States, he was described as "one of the nation's most prominent Catholic laymen" and "pillar of the Roman Catholic Church".

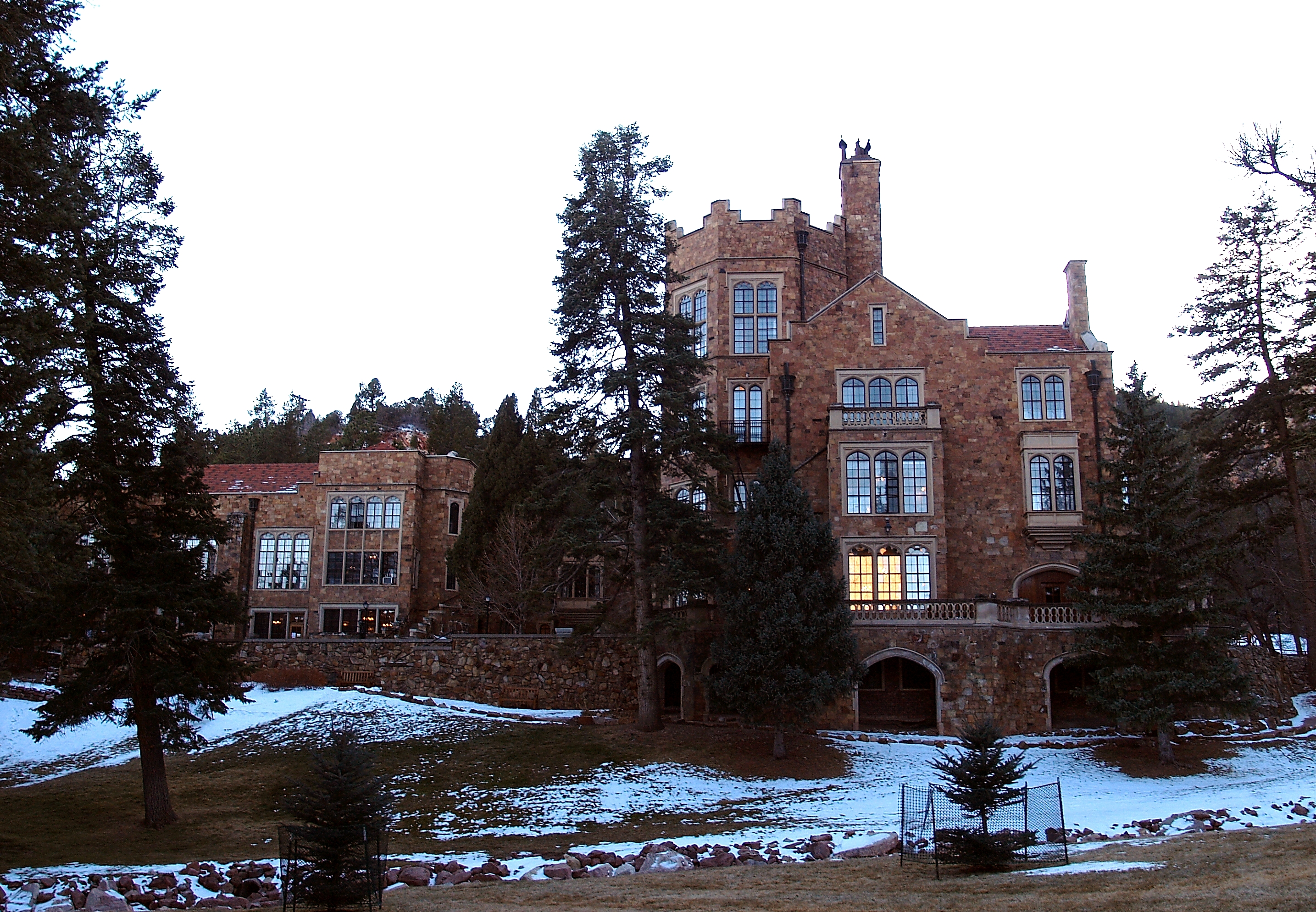
George Strake once owned the Glen Eyrie estate in Colorado Springs, Colorado, which is now open to the public.

Strake and his wife Susan E. Kehoe had three children. Their son George Strake Jr. served as chairman of the Republican Party of Texas from 1983 to 1988 after being appointed Texas Secretary of State in 1979.

Strake died on August 6, 1969 in Houston, at the age of 74.
