= David Dean (disambiguation) =

David Dean (born 1964) is an American football coach and former player.

David Dean can refer to:

- David Dean (cricketer) (1847–1919), English cricketer
- David Dean (Texas politician) (active since 1978), American politician

== See also ==
- David Dean Bottrell (born 1959), American actor, comedian and screenwriter
- David Dean O'Keefe (1824 or 1828 – 1901), Irish American ship captain
- David Dean Rusk (1909–1994), United States secretary of state
- David Dean Shulman (born 1949), Israeli indologist, poet and peace activist
