= William H. Holland =

William H. Holland may refer to:

- William Henry Holland, 1st Baron Rotherham (1849-1927), British industrialist and Liberal politician
- William H. Holland (politician), member of the Fifteenth Texas Legislature
