= 1982 Texas lieutenant gubernatorial election =

- November 2, 1982
- Turnout: 48.9% (Note: Of registered voters.) ▲10.0%
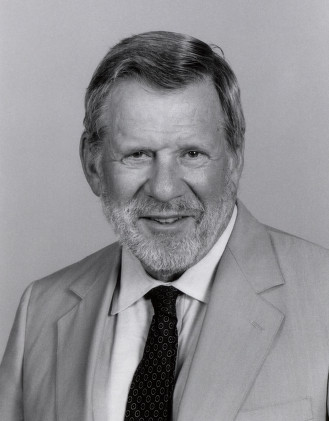

Nominee	William P. Hobby Jr.	George Strake Jr.
Party	Democratic	Republican
Popular vote	1,830,870	1,272,644
Percentage	58.3%	40.6%
- County results Hobby: 50–60% 60–70% 70–80% 80–90% Strake: 50–60% 60–70%
Lieutenant Governor before election
William P. Hobby Jr.
Democratic
Elected Lieutenant Governor
William P. Hobby Jr.
Democratic

The 1982 Texas lieutenant gubernatorial election was held on November 2, 1982, to elect the Lieutenant Governor of Texas. The Incumbent, William P. Hobby Jr. ran for re-election to his fourth term, he was elected against Republican and former Secretary of State of Texas, George Strake Jr. During the campaign Strake ran a weekly series of newspaper ads called "Strake Talk" in which he would discuss current issues with the readers and hoped to generate public interest in the issues he discussed. Hobby ultimately won the election with 58% of the vote to Strake's 40%, and was sworn in on January 18, 1983.

== Primaries ==
Primaries were held on May 1, 1982, and runoffs were held on June 5, 1982, for both parties.

Democratic primary results
Party	Candidate	Votes	%
Democratic	William P. Hobby Jr.	1,040,981	86.5
Democratic	Troy Skates	162,242	13.5
Total votes		1,203,223	100.0

Republican primary results
Party	Candidate	Votes	%
Republican	George W. Strake Jr.	198,745	100.0
Total votes		198,745	100.0

== General election results ==
General election results
Party	Candidate	Votes	%
Democratic	William P. Hobby Jr.	1,830,870	58.35
Republican	George W. Strake Jr.	1,272,644	40.56
Libertarian	Laurel K. Freeman	34,482	1.10
Total votes		3,137,996	100.00
Democratic hold			
