= James E. Rudder State Office Building =

- 1918 State Office Building and 1933 State Highway Building
- U.S. National Register of Historic Places
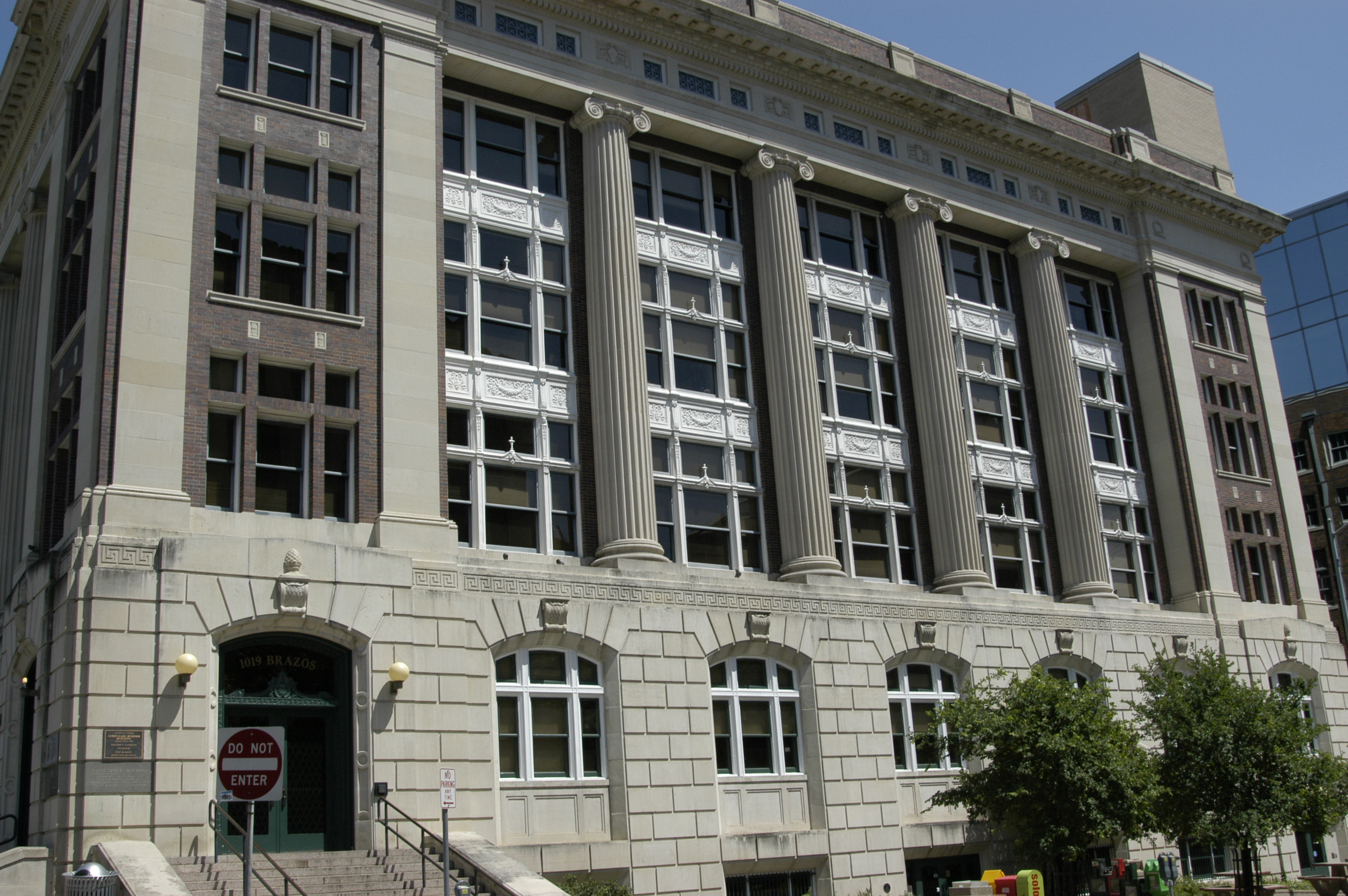

- Location within Texas Location within the United States
- Location: 1019 Brazos and 125 E 11th Streets, Austin, Texas
- Coordinates: 30°16′19″N 97°44′22″W
- Built: 1918
- Architect: Atlee B. Ayres et al.
- Architectural style: Classical Revival, Art Deco
- NRHP reference No.: 97001625
- Added to NRHP: January 7, 1998

The James Earl Rudder State Office Building is a historic office building in downtown Austin, Texas, USA. Built in 1918, the five-story structure features 18-foot ceilings and terrazzo and marble flooring.

Over time the building has housed the General Land Office, the Department of Agriculture, and the State Highway Department (today the Department of Transportation). Today, the building houses the offices for the Secretary of State.

The building is located at 1019 Brazos Street, immediately south of the old General Land Office building and east of the Dewitt C. Greer State Highway Building. It was added to the National Register of Historic Places along with the Greer Building on January 7, 1998.
