= Carlos Cascos =

American politician (1952–2024)

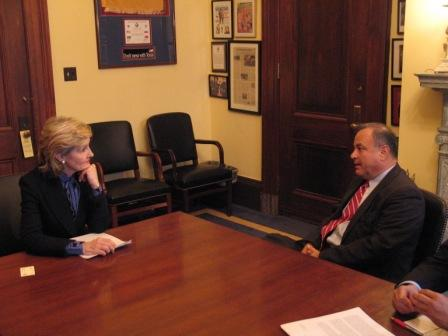
- Cascos (right) in 2007

110th Secretary of State of Texas
- In office January 13, 2015 – January 6, 2017
- Governor: Greg Abbott
- Preceded by: Nandita Berry
- Succeeded by: Rolando Pablos

Cameron County Judge
- In office January 1, 2007 – December 31, 2014
- Preceded by: Gilberto Hinojosa
- Succeeded by: Pete Sepulveda

Personal details
- Born: September 18, 1952 Matamoros, Tamaulipas, Mexico
- Died: June 26, 2024 (aged 71) Brownsville, Texas, U.S.
- Party: Republican
- Spouse: Aurora Candida Cascos
- Children: 2
- Education: University of Texas at Austin (BA)

Carlos Humberto Cascos (September 18, 1952 – June 26, 2024) was an American Certified Public Accountant and politician who was the 110th Secretary of State of Texas. He was appointed by his fellow Republican, Governor Greg Abbott, and was confirmed by the Texas Senate on February 18, 2015.

Prior to becoming Secretary of State of Texas, he served as County Judge of Cameron County from 2007 to 2015. He sought to return to the office of Cameron County Judge in the November 2022 elections, but was defeated by the Democratic incumbent Eddie Treviño, Jr.

== Death ==
On June 26, 2024, Cascos suffered an apparent cardiac event that caused him to lose control of his vehicle and crash into a parked vehicle while vacationing in South Padre Island. He was transported to Valley Regional Hospital in Brownsville where he was pronounced dead at 9:15 pm. He was 71.

Political offices
Preceded by Gilberto Hinojosa	County Judge of Cameron County; 2007–2015	Succeeded by Pete Sepulveda
Preceded by Nandita Berry	Secretary of State of Texas; 2015–2017	Succeeded by Rolando Pablos
