= Emma Grigsby Meharg =

American politician (1873–1937)

Secretary of State of Texas
- In office January 17, 1925 – January 17, 1927
- Governor: Miriam A. Ferguson
- Preceded by: Henry Hutchings
- Succeeded by: Jane Y. McCallum

Personal details
- Born: August 14, 1873 Lynnville, Tennessee, United States
- Died: September 4, 1937 (aged 64) Plainview, Texas, United States
- Party: Democratic
- Education: Southwestern Normal College

Emma Grigsby Meharg (August 14, 1873 - September 4, 1937) was the first female Secretary of State of Texas, serving from 1925 to 1927 under Governor Miriam A. Ferguson.

== Biography ==
Emma Grigsby was born to Jasper N. and Mary Amanda (Calvert) Grigsby in Lynnville, Tennessee on August 14, 1873. The family moved to Italy, Texas in 1883, and Emma attended public school there. She later attended Southwestern Normal College, graduating in 1895, and returned to Italy to teach.

She married Samuel W. Meharg of Anniston, Alabama on June 24, 1902. The couple moved to Plainview, Texas, where Samuel became the public school principal and Emma taught.

In 1925, Governor Miriam A. Ferguson appointed her as Secretary of State. Ferguson and Grigsby were the first female governor and Secretary of State in Texas. Among her recommendations during the position was the creation of a civil service system for the state; she also oversaw the restoration and cataloguing of state historical records. She also recommended that position be modified from how it was set out in the state's 1876 constitution, including a higher salary and being changed from an appointed position to an elected position.

Meharg served on the board of the Texas Technological College from 1932 to 1937. She died in Plainview on September 4, 1937, and was buried there.

Preceded by Henry Hutchings	Secretary of State of Texas; 1925-1927	Succeeded by Jane Y. McCallum
