= Bird Holland =

American politician

Secretary of State of Texas
- In office March 16, 1861 – November 7, 1861
- Governor: Edward Clark
- Preceded by: E. W. Cave
- Succeeded by: Charles S. West

Personal details
- Born: March 23, 1815
- Died: April 9, 1864 (aged 49) Pleasant Hill, Sabine Parish, Louisiana, U.S.

Bird Holland (March 23, 1815 – April 9, 1864) was a soldier, legislator, and civil servant in Texas. He served as Texas Secretary of State from March 16, 1861 to November 1861. He immigrated to the Republic of Texas in 1837, and by 1840 was living in Travis County.

== Career ==
In 1846, at the beginning of the Mexican War, Holland was named Captain of the 17th Ranger Company of the 2nd Regiment of Texas Mounted Volunteers. He only served briefly due to disability from illness at Matamoros.

He was elected Assistant Secretary of the Senate during the Third Texas Legislature in 1850 and was a member of the House during the Fifth Texas Legislature, representing the counties of Jefferson and Orange. He was on the Finance, Enrolled Bills, and Education committees. His dates of service were November 7, 1853 to November 5, 1855.

He became Secretary of State after Texas seceded from the Union in 1861. One of his duties was to certify the results of the Texas Secession Convention. His predecessor, E. W. Cave, was opposed to secession and resigned.

During the American Civil War, Holland served as adjutant in Col. Richard B. Hubbard's 22nd Texas Infantry Regiment. He was killed in action at the Battle of Pleasant Hill in Louisiana, April 8, 1864.

== Personal life ==
Bird Holland is believed to be the father of Medal of Honor recipient Milton M. Holland, Texas legislator William H. Holland, and possibly up to five additional children through his relationship with an African-American slave named Matilda who was owned by his brother, plantation owner Spearman Holland. In the 1850s he purchased the freedom of William, Milton, and Marshall, and sent them to a school in Ohio run by abolitionists, the Albany Manual Labor Academy. A few years later, he married Matilda Rust, daughter of William Rust. She died in 1858. They were married less than a year. They had one child, who died as an infant.

About a year after his death, his body was returned to Austin, where he was buried in Oakwood Cemetery. His son William and William's mother Matilda are buried in a different part of the same cemetery.

Very little is known about Bird Holland outside of official records. The Rust family had possession of some of Holland's personal papers after his death but did not preserve them. A daughter, Eliza, and a son, John, siblings of William and Milton, were included in his will.

Political offices
| Preceded by E. W. Cave | Secretary of State of Texas; 1861 | Succeeded by Charles S. West |
