= William H. Holland (politician) =

American politician (1841–1907)

Texas State Representative from District 37 (Fort Bend, Waller, and Wharton Counties)
- In office April 18, 1876 – January 14, 1879

Personal details
- Born: 1841 Marshall, Texas, USA
- Died: May 27, 1907 (aged 65–66) Mineral Wells, Texas
- Party: Republican
- Spouse: Eliza H. James
- Education: Oberlin College
- Occupation: Educator

William H. Holland (1841 – May 27, 1907) was an educator who served one term in the Texas Legislature. He was the brother of Medal of Honor recipient Milton M. Holland.

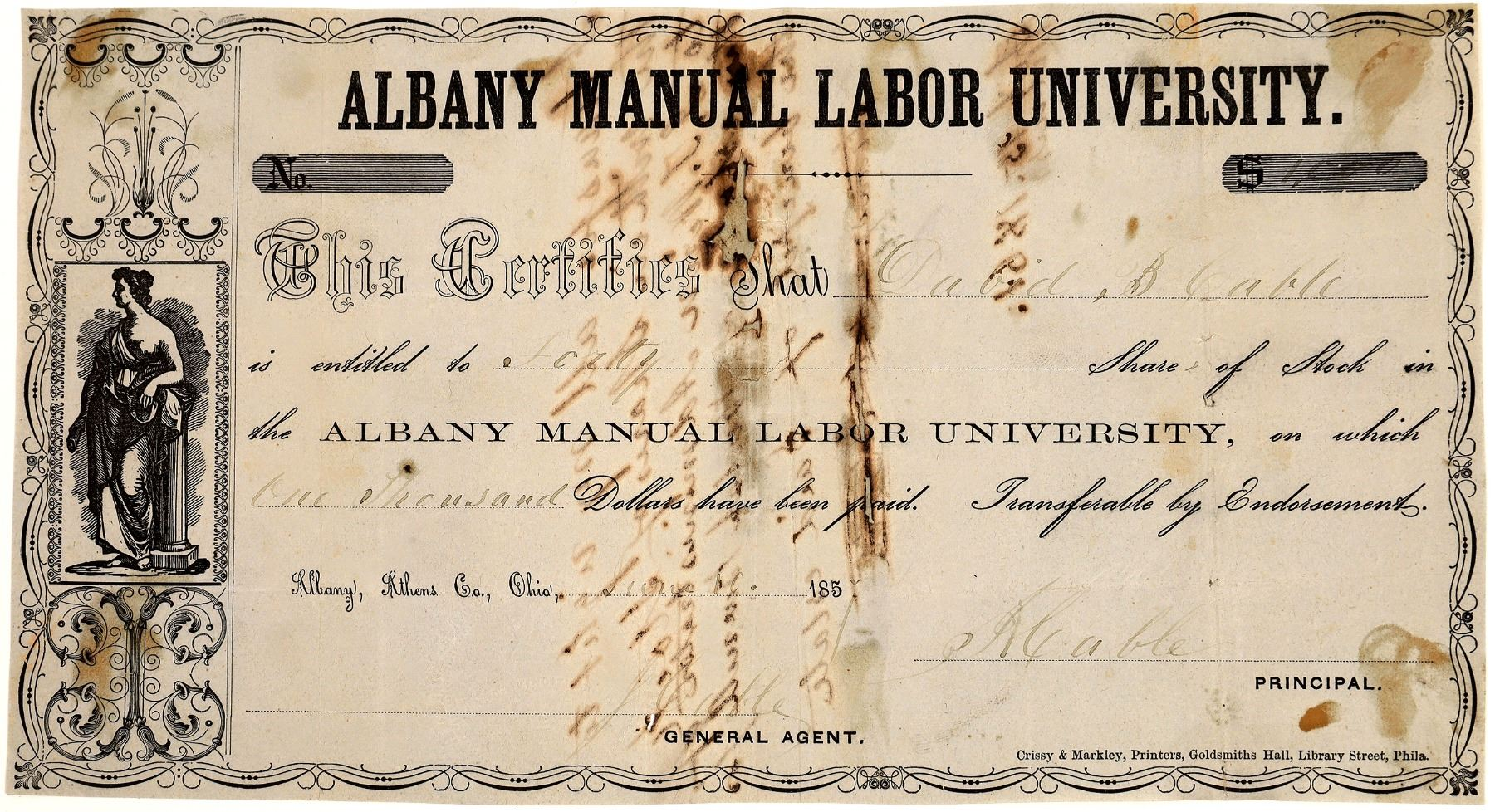
Stock certificate for AMLU, circa 1857

He was born into slavery in Marshall, Texas in 1841, the child of Captain Bird Holland and a slave named Matilda. At some time during the 1850s, his father purchased his freedom along with his two brothers and sent them to attend the Albany Manual Labor University, an abolitionist-run school in Athens County, Ohio. This college, despite its name, had a rigorous academic curriculum, but students earned part of their tuition by learning a trade. AMLU was founded by William and Lamira Lewis, who had been educated at Oberlin College.

During the American Civil War, he served in the Union Army, while his father died while serving as a Confederate Army officer. After the war ended, he returned to Texas where he taught school and became active in the Republican Party. He was elected to the legislature in 1876.

In the Legislature, he sponsored the bill calling for creation of Prairie View Normal College (now Prairie View A&M University). In 1876 and 1880 he was chosen as a delegate to the Republican national convention. He later submitted a memorandum to the Texas legislature leading to the establishment of a school, the Deaf, Dumb, and Blind Institute for Colored Youth; he was appointed by the governor as its first Superintendent.

In 2018, the city council of Austin, Texas, voted to rename Jeff Davis Avenue to William Holland Avenue.

== See also ==
- African American officeholders from the end of the Civil War until before 1900
