= John L. Wortham =

Texas businessman and politician

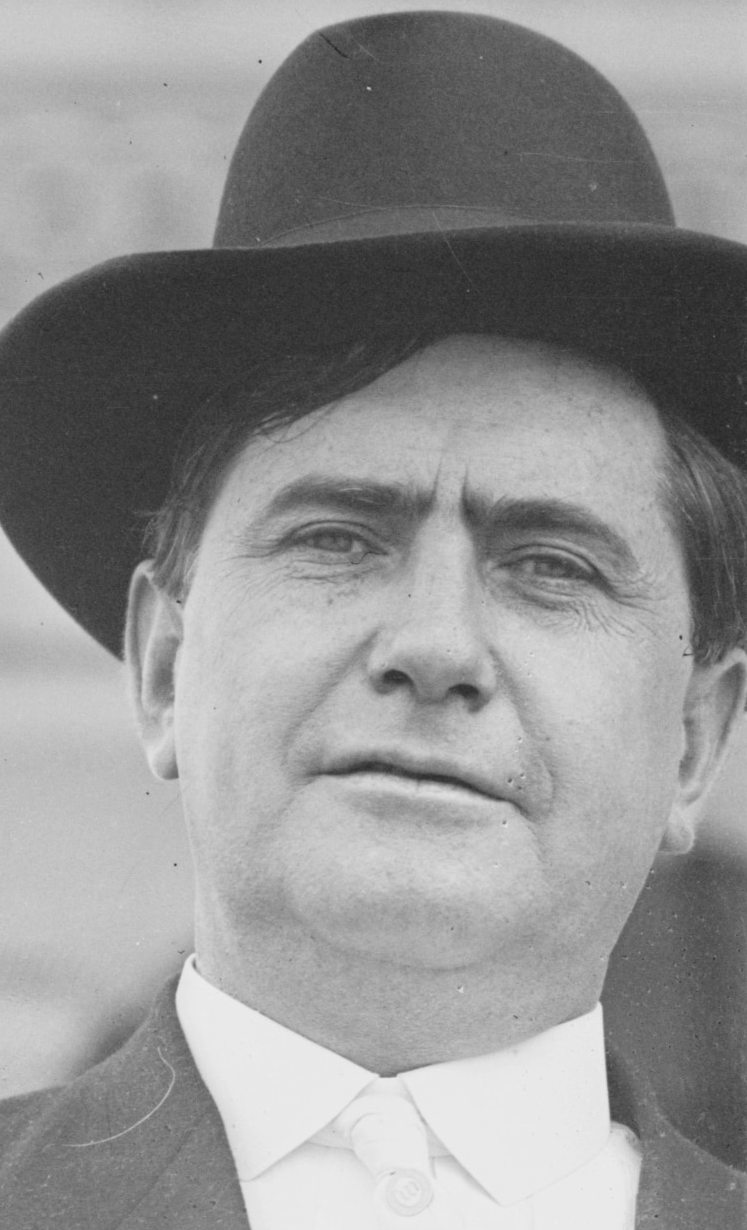

Secretary of State of Texas
- In office January 1913 – June 1913
- Governor: Oscar Branch Colquitt
- Preceded by: J. T. Bowman
- Succeeded by: Ferdinand C. Weinert

Railroad Commissioner of Texas
- In office January 21, 1911 – January 1, 1913
- Governor: Oscar Branch Colquitt
- Preceded by: Oscar Branch Colquitt
- Succeeded by: Earle B. Mayfield

Personal details
- Born: February 22, 1862; Freestone County, Texas, U.S.
- Died: November 4, 1924 (aged 62)

John Lee Wortham (July 18, 1862 – November 4, 1924) was an American politician who served as a member of the Railroad Commission of Texas from 1911 to 1913 and as the Secretary of State of Texas in 1913. Wortham was born in Woodland, Freestone County, Texas. With his son Gus Wortham, he started the John L. Wortham and Son insurance agency. He died in Houston.

Political offices
Preceded by J. T. Bowman	Secretary of State of Texas; 1913	Succeeded by F. C. Weinert
Preceded by Oscar Branch Colquitt	Railroad Commissioner of Texas; 1911–1913	Succeeded by Earle B. Mayfield
