= Mrs. Sam Houston House =

Historic house in Texas, United States

- U.S. National Register of Historic Places
- Recorded Texas Historic Landmark
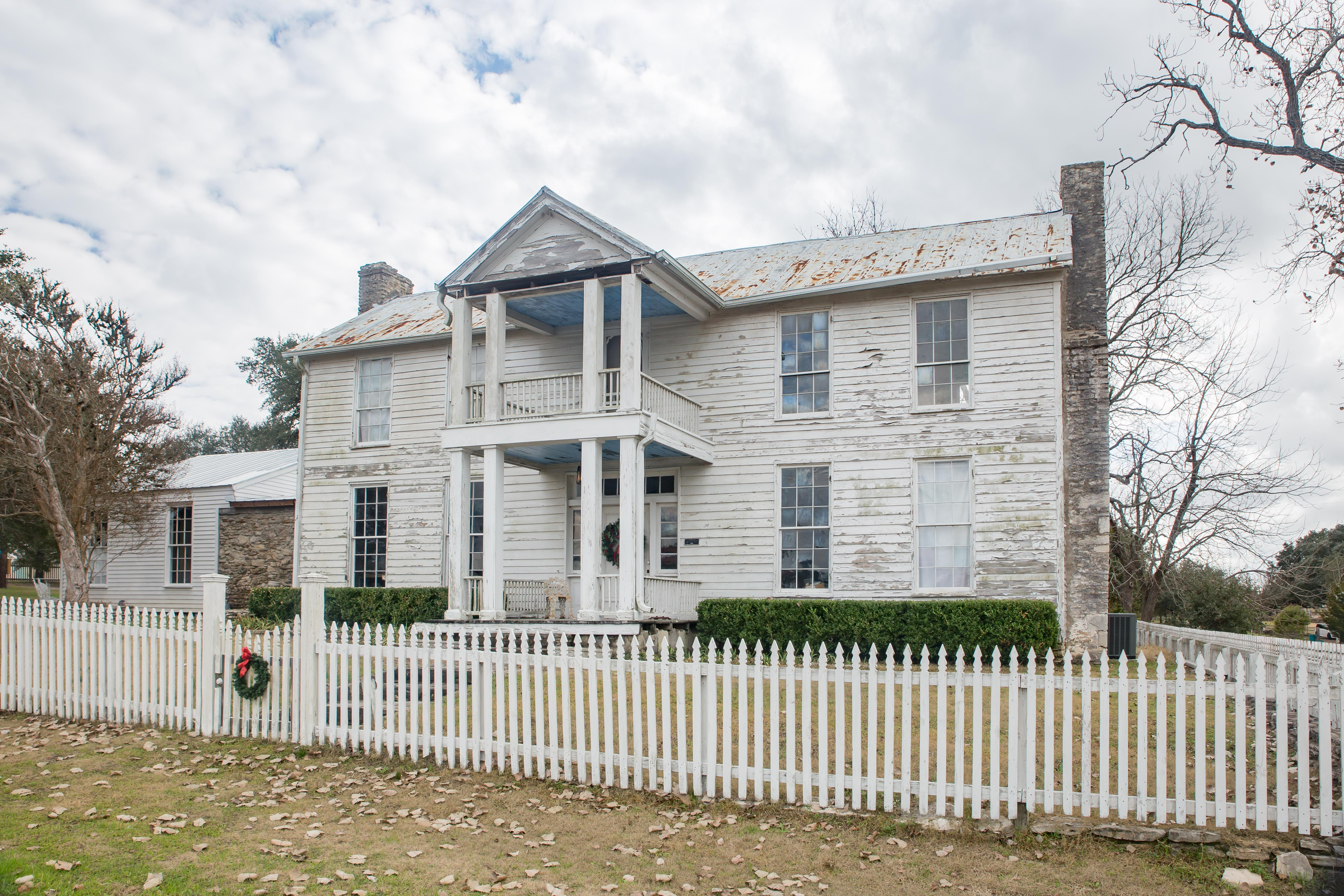
- Mrs. Sam Houston House in 2023

- Location within Texas Location within the United States
- Location: FM 390, one block east of FM 50, Independence, Texas.
- Coordinates: 30°19′8″N 96°20′41″W
- Area: 0.3 acres (0.12 ha)
- Built: 1832
- Architectural style: Greek Revival
- NRHP reference No.: 70000775
- RTHL No.: 8352

Significant dates
- Added to NRHP: October 22, 1970
- Designated RTHL: 1965

Mrs. Sam Houston House is a historic house on Farm to Market Road 390 in Independence, Texas. Sometimes known as the Root house, this Greek Revival house was built probably around 1855. Margaret Lea Houston, the widow of politician and Texas statesman Sam Houston, bought the house in 1864 from Major Eber Cave, a family friend. She lived in it during her final years until her death in 1867. The property was listed on the National Register of Historic Places in 1970 as the "Mrs. Sam Houston House," notable for its association with her.

== See also ==
- Sam Houston and slavery
- List of the oldest buildings in Texas
- National Register of Historic Places listings in Washington County, Texas
- Recorded Texas Historic Landmarks in Washington County
