= Gwyn Shea =

American politician (born 1937)

103rd Secretary of State of Texas
- In office January 7, 2002 – August 14, 2003
- Governor: Rick Perry
- Preceded by: Henry Cuellar
- Succeeded by: Geoff Connor

Member of the Texas House of Representatives from the 98th district
- In office 3 January 1983 – 3 January 1993
- Succeeded by: Nancy Moffat

Personal details
- Born: August 3, 1937 (age 89)
- Party: Republican
- Spouse: John Joseph Shea
- Children: 2
- Education: North Texas State University; Dallas Baptist University
- Profession: Businesswoman

Gwyn Clarkston Shea (born August 3, 1937) is an American politician from Texas. A member of the Republican Party, she served as the Texas State Representative for the 98th district from 1983 to 1993. Shea also served as the 103rd Secretary of State of Texas from 2002 to 2003 under Governor Rick Perry. She was appointed to the office following the resignation of Henry Cuellar.

Texas House of Representatives
Preceded by Missing	Texas State Representative for District 98 (Dallas County); 1983–1993	Succeeded by Nancy Moffat
Political offices
Preceded by Henry Cuellar	Secretary of State of Texas; 2002–2003	Succeeded by Geoff Connor
Preceded by Missing	Constable, Precinct 2, Dallas County, Texas; 1993–2002	Succeeded by Missing
