= E. W. Cave =

American politician (1831–1904)

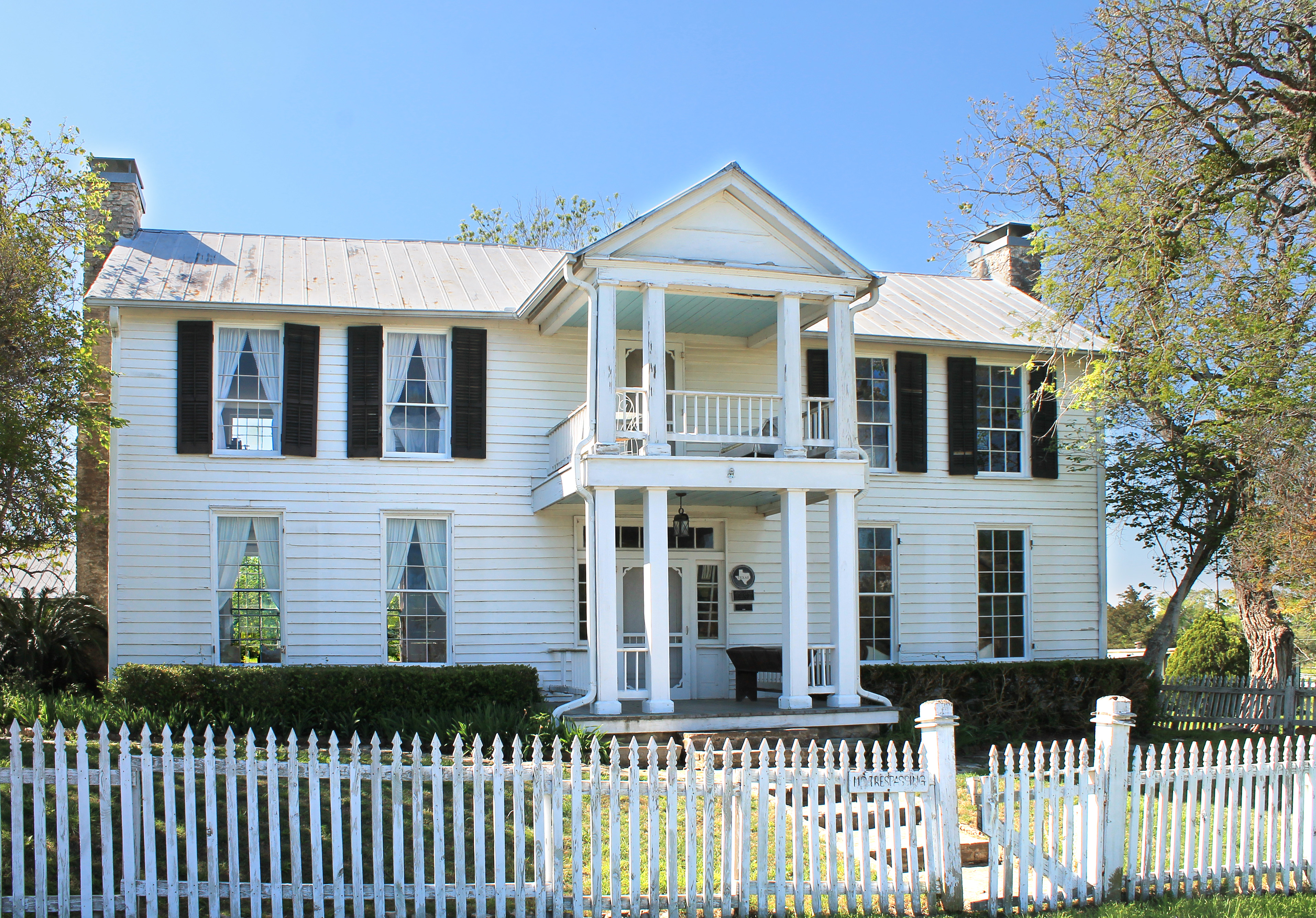
In 1864 E.W. Cave sold what was later known as the Mrs. Sam Houston House to Margaret Lea Houston

Eber Worthington Cave (July 14, 1831 – March 28, 1904) was a journalist, civic promoter, and politician in Texas. He was born in Philadelphia, Pennsylvania, and began working as a printer in New Jersey. He moved to Texas in 1853 and bought the Nacogdoches Chronicle in 1854. As editor of this newspaper, he opposed re-opening the African slave trade and supported Sam Houston in his effort to become Governor in the late 1850s. Houston made Cave his Secretary of State in late 1859. An opponent of secession, Cave resigned in early 1861. He did later materially support the Confederacy and served as a Confederate officer with the rank of Major. In 1864 he sold what was later known as the Mrs. Sam Houston House to his friend Margaret Lea Houston.

In his later years, Cave was an executive with railroad and shipping companies. He helped to promote what eventually became the Houston Ship Channel.

Major Cave died March 28, 1904, several days after falling from a streetcar, and was buried in Houston in Glenwood Cemetery.

Political offices
Preceded by T. Scott Anderson	Secretary of State of Texas; December 27, 1859 – March 16, 1861	Succeeded by Bird Holland
