= John Fainter =

American politician (1939–2020)

93rd Secretary of State of Texas
- In office 1983–1984
- Preceded by: David Dean
- Succeeded by: Myra McDaniel

Personal details
- Born: April 20, 1939 Pecos, Texas, U.S.
- Died: August 29, 2020 (aged 81)

John Wells Fainter Jr. (April 20, 1939 – August 29, 2020) was an American politician who served as the 93rd Secretary of State of Texas from 1983 to 1984.

== Biography ==
Fainter was born in Pecos, Texas to John Wells Fainter Sr. and Sarah Fainter. Fainter was raised in Austin, Texas. Attending the University of Texas at Austin School of Law, where he earned a Bachelor's Degree in 1962.

Fainter served as Assistant Attorney General of Texas from 1979 to 1983, resigning from that post after being appointed Secretary of State by Governor Mark White shortly after he assumed office.

After serving as Secretary of State, he ended up as Chief of Staff for Governor Ann Richards. A notable event during this time being a scandal regarding lost phone logs, when Travis County District Attorney Ronnie Earle indicted former State Treasurer and U.S. Senator Kay Bailey Hutchison for allegedly being involved in the destruction of records. Alongside Governor Ann Richards facing scrutiny over her administration discarding records themselves. Fainter's role involved speaking to journalists and the public, stating that Richard's staff was responsible for the handling of record transferring.

== Death and legacy ==
Fainter died in Austin, Texas on August 29, 2020, at the age of 81. In 2023 Texas State Representative John Kuempel sponsored a bill which would commemorate the life of Fainter. It was unanimously adopted on March 8, 2023.

Political offices
Preceded by David Dean	Secretary of State of Texas; 1983–1984	Succeeded by Myra McDaniel
