= Geoff Connor =

American politician (born 1963)

104th Texas Secretary of State
- In office 18 August 2003 – 2 February 2005
- Governor: Rick Perry
- Preceded by: Gwyn Shea
- Succeeded by: Roger Williams
- Acting; October 5, 2001 – January 7, 2002
- Governor: Rick Perry
- Preceded by: Henry Cuellar
- Succeeded by: Gwyn Shea

Personal details
- Born: July 23, 1963 (age 63) Winters, Runnels County, Texas, USA
- Party: Republican
- Education: Texas State University; Birkbeck College, University of London; University of Texas Law School.
- Profession: attorney and entrepreneur.

Geoffrey Scott Connor (born July 24, 1963) is an American public servant, attorney, historian, and businessman from the state of Texas. Connor has been an aide or appointee of several Republican Governors of Texas, including William P. Clements, Jr., George W. Bush, and Rick Perry. Most notably, Connor served as the 104th Secretary of State of Texas under Governor Perry. Connor's tenure in this position was especially noteworthy for his efforts to build strong diplomatic and trade relationships between Texas and foreign countries.

Since leaving the Texas Secretary of State's Office, Connor has been active as a consultant, lobbyist, academician, and attorney. His current public service includes positions with The William P. Clements Jr. Center for National Security, Alamo Board of the Texas General Land Office, and Texas State Guard. He remains active internationally and with the diplomatic community in the state of Texas.

== Background ==
Connor was born and reared in Runnels County, a predominantly rural county near San Angelo, Texas. In 1985, Connor received a B.A. from Texas State University (formerly Southwest Texas State University) in International Studies. Connor also studied abroad at Birkbeck College, University of London. He later attended the University of Texas School of Law in Austin, from which he received his J.D. degree in 1988. He has been board certified in administrative law since 1995. He completed a graduate certificate course from the Texas A&M University Bush School of Public Service focused on Intelligence Studies. In 2016, Connor received his PhD in history from the University of Texas at Austin with a focus on modern U.S. diplomatic and national security history. Connor was a member of the Sigma Tau Gamma fraternity while attending Texas State University.

Connor lived in the United Kingdom in 1985. During this time, he served as an analyst for the British Government and was a top aide to the Chairman of the House of Lords Foreign Policy Committee (The Earl of Kimberley) and the Chairman of the Lords Defence Committee (Lord Chalfont).

== Early political career ==
Connor began his career in American public service as Assistant General Counsel to Governor William Perry Clements, Jr., in 1988. By the time he departed the Governor's office in 1991, Connor had advanced to Deputy General Counsel. In 1991, Connor joined the Texas Department of Agriculture as assistant commissioner and general counsel under then Agriculture Commissioner Rick Perry. In 1995, he became general counsel for the Texas Commission on Environmental Quality, a post he held until 1999.

During the 1990s, Connor also served as a member of the State Emergency Communications Commission (appointed by Governor Clements in 1990) and as a member of the Coastal Coordination Committee (appointed by Governor George W. Bush in 1995).

After more than a decade in government, Connor took a break from the public sector and accepted a position with the Austin office of the international law and lobby firm of Akin, Gump, Strauss, Hauer and Feld (1999–2001).

== Texas Secretary of State’s Office ==
When Rick Perry became Governor of Texas in January 2001, he tapped Connor to serve as the Deputy Secretary in the office of the Texas Secretary of State. This office, which evolved out of the Secretary of State of the Republic of Texas, has a diverse portfolio that includes supervising elections, serving as chief protocol officer for Texas, acting as the Governor's liaison on border and Mexico affairs, as well as maintaining a variety of corporate and commercial filings.

With the departure of Secretary of State Henry Cuellar in October 2001, Connor served four months as Acting Secretary of State until the swearing in of Gwyn Clarkston Shea as Secretary of State in January 2002. Following Shea's swearing-in, Connor resumed his duties as Deputy Secretary of State.

Upon Shea's resignation, Governor Perry appointed Connor to be the 104th Secretary of State of Texas. Connor's swearing-in ceremony was held on September 26, 2003. His tenure was noteworthy as the first Texas Secretary of State in recent history to use the office to promote Texas business internationally. He made use of the Secretary's role as chief protocol officer for the state to encourage trade and foreign investment. During his time with the Secretary of State's office, Connor led around a dozen trade missions to countries, including China, Mexico, Brazil, France, Trinidad and Tobago, Vietnam and Ethiopia.

During Connor's time with the Secretary of State's office, Texas overtook California as America's largest exporting state. From 2001 to 2004, Texas exports grew by 23.4% to $117.2 billion. While there are multiple factors behind the state's increasing prominence in exports, the focused and active promotion of Texas exports by the state's chief international officer played a role.

At the beginning of 2005, Connor resigned from the Secretary of State's office to pursue a variety of private sector activities.

== Private Sector and Later Public Service ==
Shortly after returning to the private sector, Connor cofounded Texas Global, an international strategic consulting firm that advises clients on government affairs, economic development, and corporate growth. Connor's partner in establishing Texas Global is Ambassador Sada Cumber, who served as the United States Special Envoy to the Organization of the Islamic Conference until January 2009.

Simultaneously, Connor returned to practicing law with the Texas-based law firm of Jackson Walker, LLP. Connor's time at Jackson Walker focused on business transactions law.

The same year, Connor also cofounded CACH Capital Management, a boutique investment advisory firm offering wealth management and investment advisory services.

Since leaving the Texas Secretary of State's office, Connor has maintained a strong international focus and his ties to a variety of international communities in Texas and the United States. He is frequently sought as a speaker on issues of international politics, the world economy, and cross-cultural cooperation. He also serves as a contact and advisor for foreign businesses and organizations seeking to achieve business or policy goals in the U.S., as well as by U.S. entities looking to enhance their performance or impact abroad.

His continued work with international clients has taken him to Qatar, the UAE, Malta, New Zealand, Barbados, Pakistan and India. Connor served as an international election monitor for presidential elections in Liberia in 2006, Georgia in 2008, and Ukraine in 2010.

In 2011, Connor was commissioned as an officer with the Texas State Guard. Currently holding the rank of Lt. Colonel, he serves as JAG for the Office of the Inspector General.

Connor serves as a National Security Fellow for The Center for National Security at the University of Texas at Austin. Connor previously compiled and curated of the defense and national security papers of Governor Bill Clements from his service to Presidents Richard Nixon, Gerald Ford, and Ronald Reagan.

In 2015, George P. Bush, Commissioner of the Texas General Land Office named Connor as his special advisor to the Alamo Board. Overseeing the Alamo Mission in San Antonio, site of the Battle of the Alamo, is part of the Land Office's mandate.

Connor is active in a number of civic, educational, and professional organizations. He is a member of the Austin Council on Foreign Affairs, the Venerable Order of St. John, Explorers Club of New York, Safari Club International, Texas Philosophical Society, Texas Lyceum, the Sovereign Military Order of the Temple of Jerusalem, the Royal Society of St. George, and the Friends of St. George Temple Windsor.

Political offices
Preceded by Gwen Clarkston Shea	Secretary of State of Texas; 2003-2005	Succeeded by Roger Williams
