= Lynnville, Tennessee =

- Town
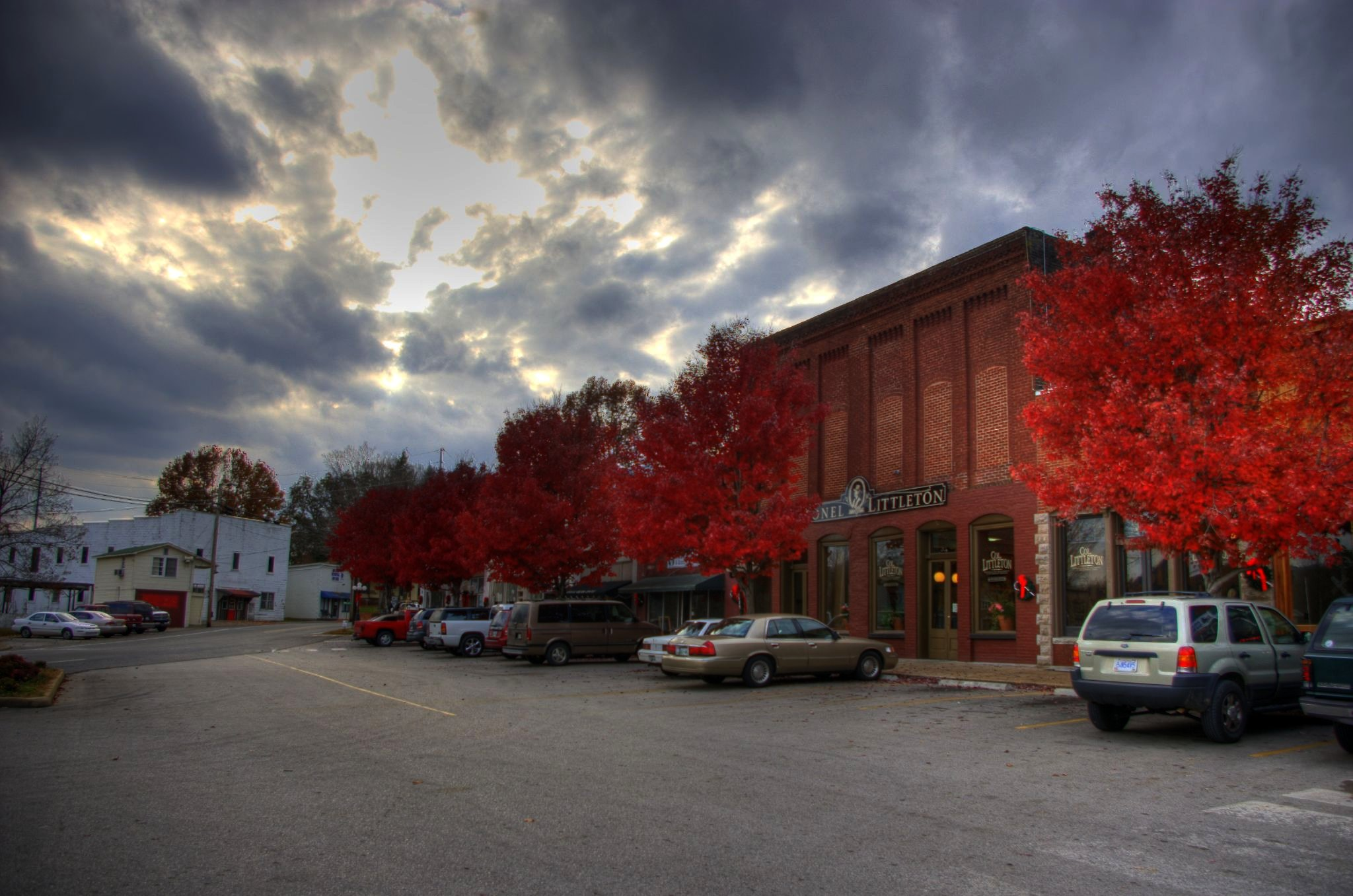
- Downtown Lynnville, 2009

- Flag
- Motto: "Striving to be the best small town in America."
- Location of Lynnville in Giles County, Tennessee.
- Coordinates: 35°22′38″N 87°0′19″W
- Country: United States
- State: Tennessee
- County: Giles
- Settled: 1809

Government
  - Mayor: Tim Turner

Area
  - Total: 0.34 sq mi (0.88 km^{2})
  - Land: 0.34 sq mi (0.88 km^{2})
  - Water: 0 sq mi (0.00 km^{2})
- Elevation: 751 ft (229 m)

Population (2020)
  - Total: 292
  - Density: 861.6/sq mi (332.66/km^{2})
- Time zone: UTC-6 (Central (CST))
  - Summer (DST): UTC-5 (CDT)
- ZIP code: 38472
- Area code: 931
- FIPS code: 47-44420
- GNIS feature ID: 1292366
- Website: https://historiclynnville.com/

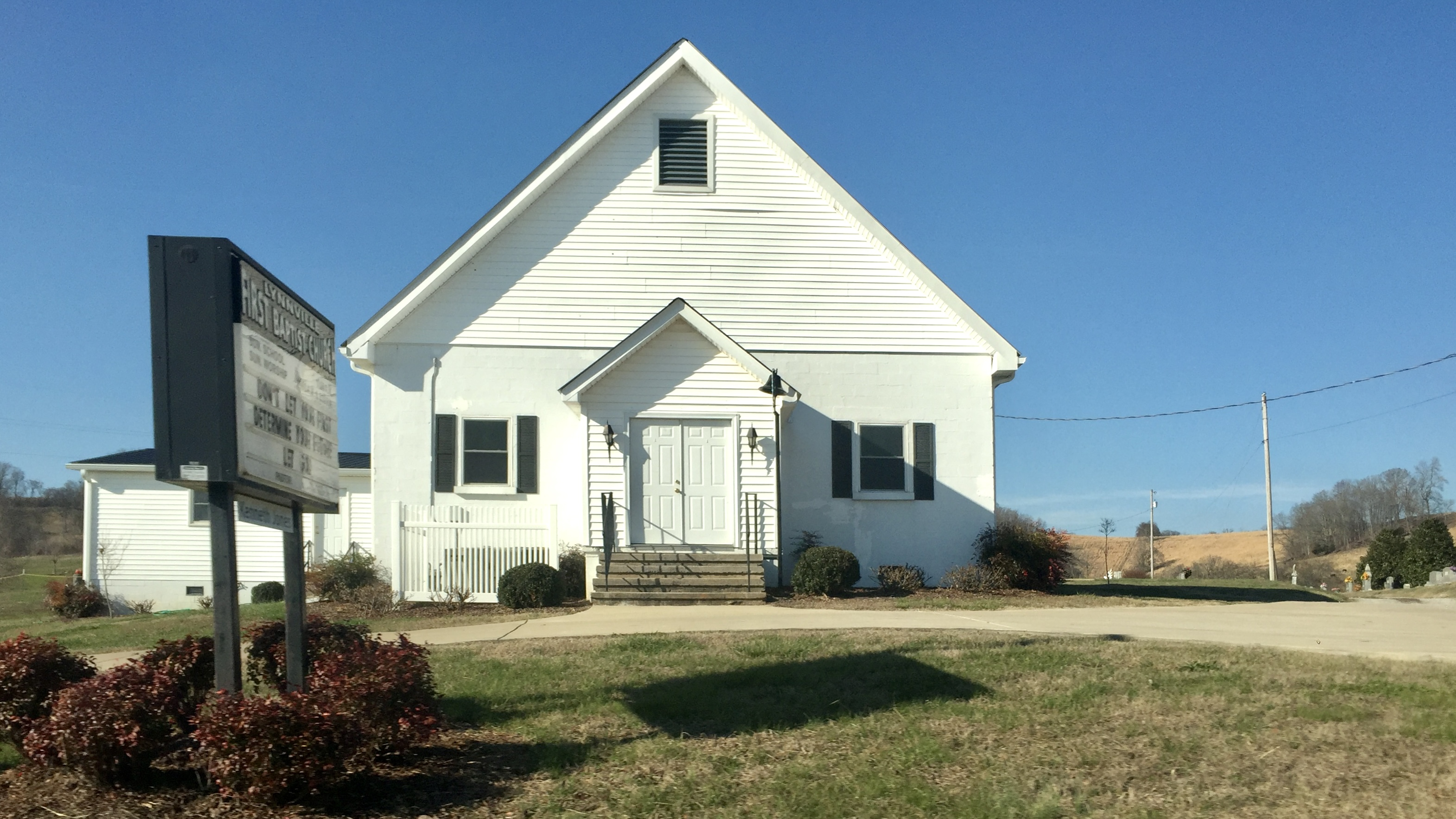
Lynnville First Baptist Church

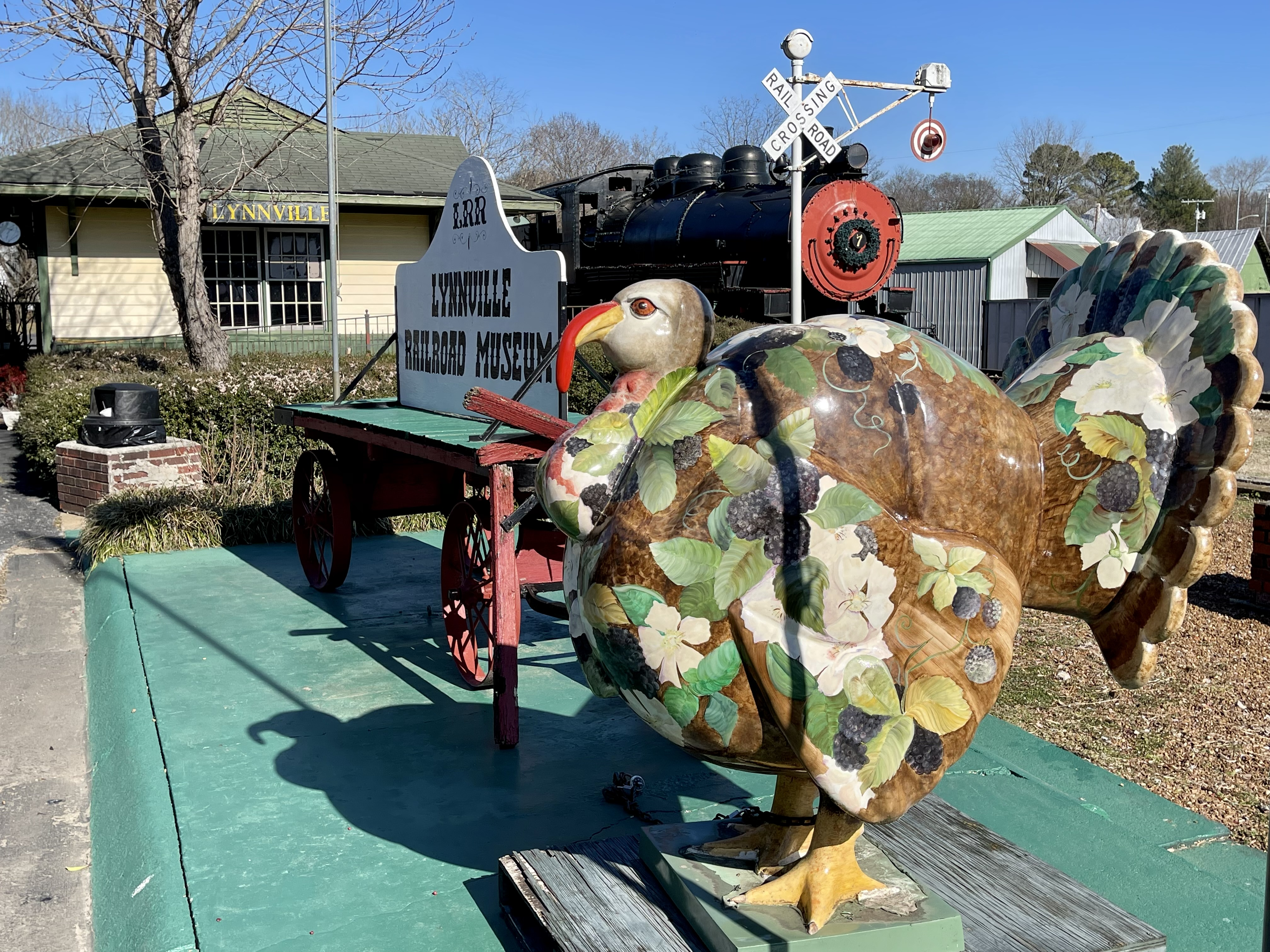
Lynnville Railroad Museum 2/1/22

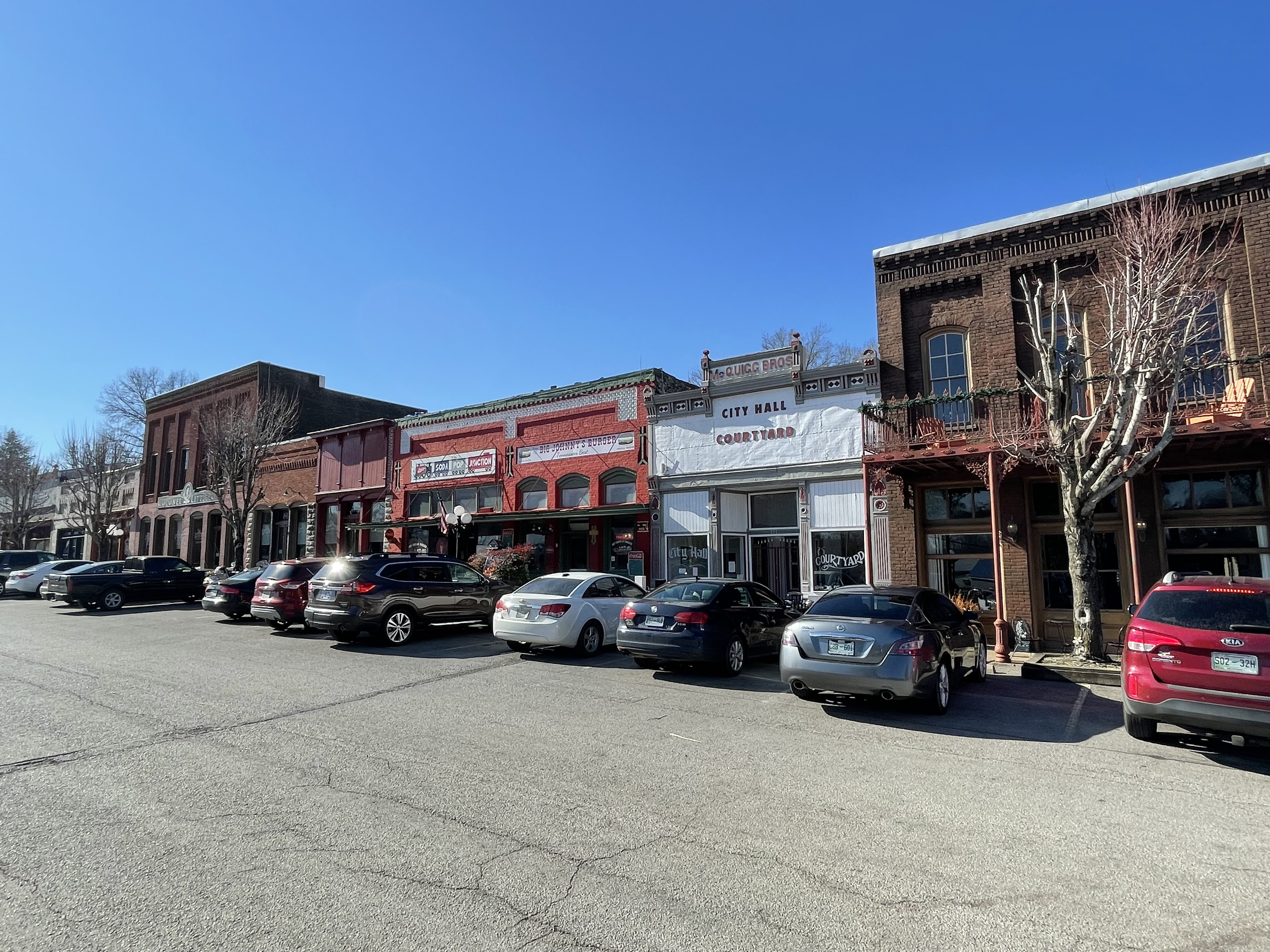
Downtown Lynnville, February 2022

Lynnville is a town in Giles County, Tennessee. As of the 2020 census, Lynnville had a population of 292. The name is from a local creek. Richland High School is located near Lynnville and serves the town and surrounding areas.

== Geography ==
Lynnville is located at 35°22′38″N 87°0′19″W (35.377313, -87.005306).

According to the United States Census Bureau, the town has a total area of 0.3 square miles (0.78 km^{2}), all land.

Lynnville is in the south-central part of Tennessee. It is located on State Route 129, east of U.S. Route 31.

== Demographics ==
Historical population
Census	Pop.	Note	%±
1870	154		—
1880	228		48.1%
1890	243		6.6%
1910	596		—
1920	552		−7.4%
1930	422		−23.6%
1940	374		−11.4%
1950	356		−4.8%
1960	362		1.7%
1970	327		−9.7%
1980	383		17.1%
1990	344		−10.2%
2000	345		0.3%
2010	287		−16.8%
2020	292		1.7%

As of the census of 2000, there were 345 people, 150 households, and 96 families living in the town. The population density was 1,060.2 inhabitants per square mile (409.3/km^{2}). There were 161 housing units at an average density of 494.7 per square mile (191.0/km^{2}). The racial makeup of the town was 87.83% White, 9.57% African American, 1.16% Native American, 0.29% Asian, 0.29% Pacific Islander, and 0.87% from two or more races.

There were 150 households, out of which 28.0% had children under the age of 18 living with them, 46.0% were married couples living together, 11.3% had a female householder with no husband present, and 36.0% were non-families. 35.3% of all households were made up of individuals, and 20.7% had someone living alone who was 65 years of age or older. The average household size was 2.30 and the average family size was 2.98.

In the town the population was spread out, with 23.5% under the age of 18, 7.5% from 18 to 24, 23.2% from 25 to 44, 26.7% from 45 to 64, and 19.1% who were 65 years of age or older. The median age was 41 years. For every 100 females, there were 98.3 males. For every 100 females age 18 and over, there were 89.9 males.

The median income for a household in the town was $36,875, and the median income for a family was $45,000. Males had a median income of $31,875 versus $18,854 for females. The per capita income for the town was $15,147. About 9.8% of families and 14.2% of the population were below the poverty line, including 11.3% of those under age 18 and 22.0% of those age 65 or over.

As of the 2010 census, there were 287 people living in the town. The racial makeup of the town was 91.64% White, 8.01% African American, and 0.35% from two or more races. In the town, the population was 5.57% under 5 years, 13.94% from 5 to 17, 61.32% from 18-64, and 19.16% 65 years and older. 50.17% were male and 49.83% were female.

== Notable people ==
- Emma Grigsby Meharg (1873-1937), Texas Secretary of State and educator, was born in Lynnville.
