= Steven C. Oaks =

American politician

Secretary of State of Texas
- In office October 27, 1977 – January 16, 1979
- Governor: Dolph Briscoe
- Preceded by: Mark White
- Succeeded by: George Strake Jr.

Personal details
- Born: 1938 (age 87–88) Oakland, California, U.S.
- Party: Democratic
- Education: College of William & Mary; University of Texas

Steven C. Oaks (born 1938) is an American politician who served as secretary of state of Texas from 1977 to 1979.

Oaks was born in Oakland, California in 1938. He attended the College of William & Mary and the University of Texas.

Oaks was a Harris County party chairman for three years.
