= Dewitt C. Greer State Highway Building =

- 1918 State Office Building and 1933 State Highway Building
- U.S. National Register of Historic Places
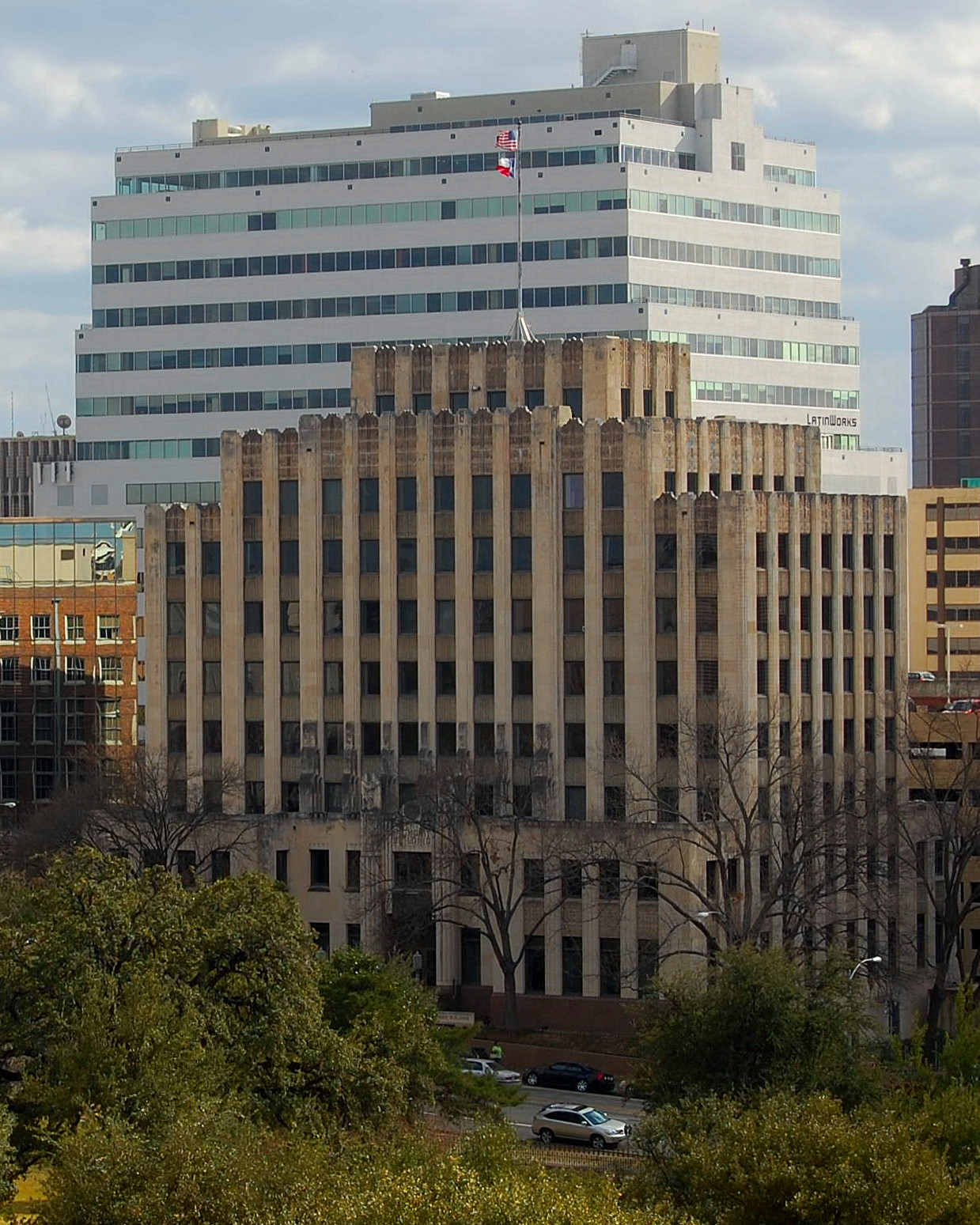
- The State Highway Building (foreground) in 2009

- Location within Texas Location within the United States
- Location: 125 E. 11th Sts., Austin, Texas
- Coordinates: 30°16′19″N 97°44′24″W
- Area: less than one acre
- Built: 1933
- Architect: Atlee B. Ayres
- Architectural style: Classical Revival, Art Deco
- NRHP reference No.: 97001625
- Added to NRHP: January 7, 1998

The Dewitt C. Greer State Highway Building is an eight-story structure in downtown Austin, Texas housing offices of the Texas Department of Transportation since its completion. Located at the southwest corner of 11th and Brazos Streets (125 E. 11th Street), the building was designed by San Antonio architect Carleton Adams and finished in 1933 at a cost of $455,000. It features elaborate Art Deco styling, including decorative carved limestone panels above the front doors. The building was added to the National Register of Historic Places along with the 1918 State Office Building in 1998.

== Texas Historical Commission Marker Text ==
Established April 4, 1917 - Early 20th century Texas farmers demanded all-weather access to markets just as automobiles revolutionized transportation for all travelers. Good-roads promoters envisioned a central state agency to organize safe, consistent routes. In 1916, the federal government offered matching funds to build a statewide highway system. In 1917, legislators created the Texas Highway Department, and Texans registered 195,000 automobiles. Agency employees worked in the Capitol, then the 1917 Land Office, and soon the agency opened district offices across the state. In 1921, federal officials approved a 2,900-mile Texas system, ensured by a one-cent-per-gallon state gas tax after 1923. During the Great Depression, federal relief funds stimulated massive road building. Engineers also promoted a new headquarters, and in 1933 completed this state highway building. From here, Dewitt Carlock Greer (1902–1986) served as state highway engineer, 1940–1967, and commissioner, 1969 to 1981, when legislators named the building for him. That year, as the agency's role expanded to public transportation, it managed 71,000 miles of highways for 12 million Texas vehicles. (1997)
