= Henry Hutchings =

American general, publisher and politician

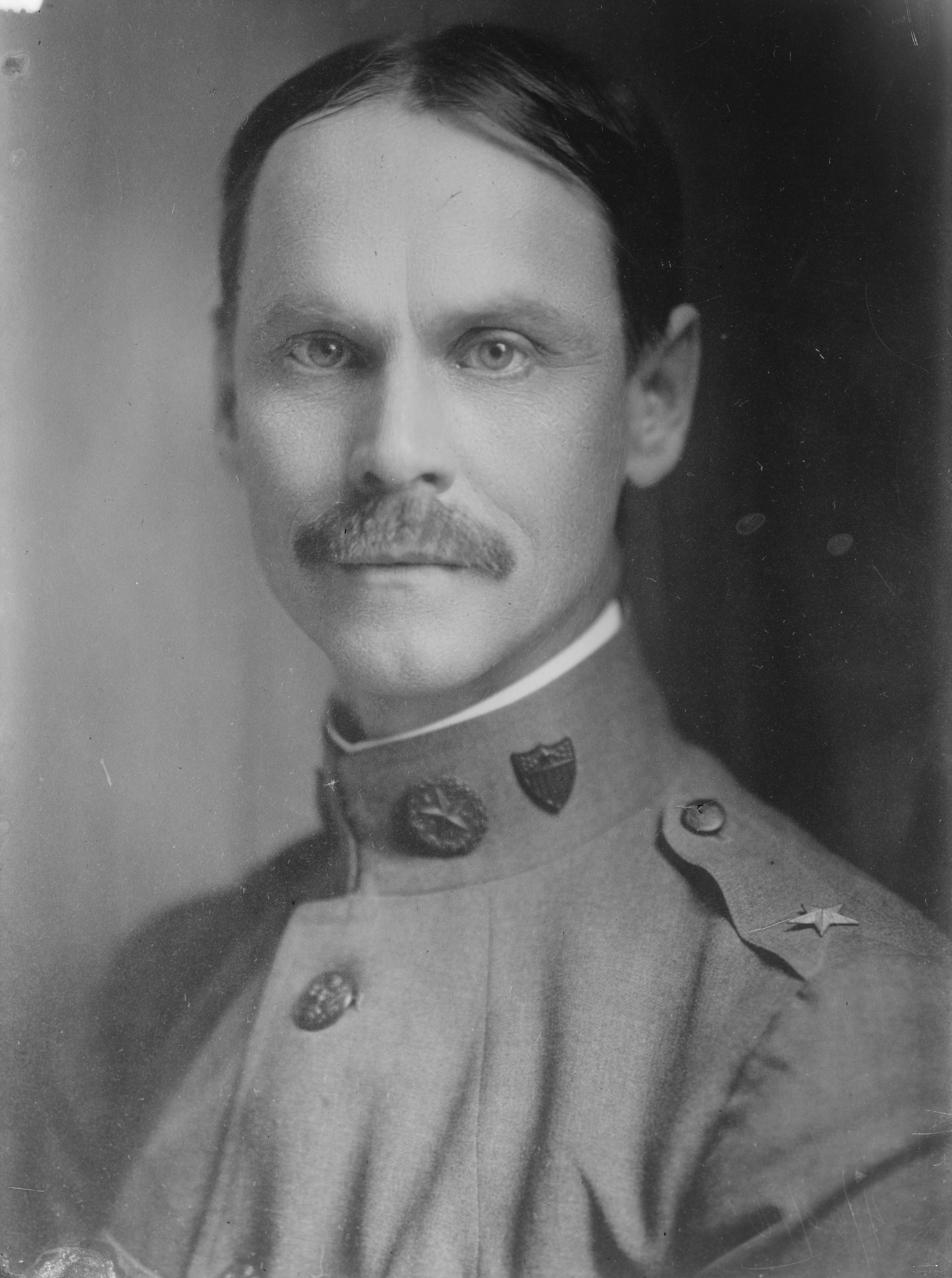
- Hutchings in 1915

Secretary of State of Texas
- In office January 1, 1925 – January 20, 1925
- Governor: Pat Morris Neff
- Preceded by: J. D. Strickland
- Succeeded by: Emma Grigsby Meharg

Personal details
- Born: August 17, 1865 Somersetshire, England
- Died: July 17, 1939 (aged 73) Austin, Texas, US
- Resting place: Texas State Cemetery, Austin, Texas
- Spouse(s): Whittie Brown; Hallie White
- Children: 7
- Occupation: Newspaper publisher

Military service
- Allegiance: United States
- Years of service: 1882–1927, 1933–1935
- Rank: Major General
- Unit: Iowa National Guard; Texas National Guard; United States Army
- Commands: 71st Infantry Brigade; Texas National Guard
- Battles/wars: Pancho Villa Expedition; World War I

Henry Hutchings (August 17, 1865 – July 17, 1939) was a soldier of the Iowa National Guard, officer of the Texas National Guard and U.S. Army, founder of the Austin Evening News and Austin Statesman, Texas Secretary of State, and Adjutant General of Texas.

== Early life and career ==
Henry Hutchings was born in Somersetshire, England, on August 17, 1865. In 1866, Hutchings and his family moved to Iowa. Hutchings joined the Iowa National Guard. Three years later, he moved to Texas and joined the Texas National Guard. In 1890, he founded and published the Austin Evening News and later published the Austin Statesman.

== World War I ==
From January 23, 1911, to 1917, Hutchings was Adjutant General of Texas. In 1917, he resigned as adjutant general to command the 71st Infantry Brigade and was stationed in France.

== Later life and political career ==
After World War I, Hutchings was given command of the 71st Infantry Brigade and returned to Texas. He commanded the brigade until his retirement in 1927. In January 1925, Hutchings served as Secretary of State during the closing weeks of Governor Pat M. Neff's term.

From January 18, 1933, to January 15, 1935, he resumed Adjutant General of Texas position. Hutchings was executive officer in charge of the narcotics division of the Texas Department of Public Safety until his death.

== Death and burial ==
Hutchings died on July 27, 1935, in Austin Texas. He was buried at Texas State Cemetery in Austin.

== Relations ==
In 1886, Henry Hutchings married Whittie Brown and had seven children. Hutchings remarried to Hallie White on March 9, 1935. One of Hutchings' sons, Henry Hutchings Jr. was an officer in the United States Army Corps of Engineers.

== Personal life ==
Henry Hutchings was an Episcopalian. He was a vestryman at St. David's Church in Austin, Texas for twenty years. He was the founder of the Austin Evening News and the Austin Statesman.
