= George Strake Jr. =

American politician (1935–2024)

Secretary of State of Texas
- In office January 16, 1979 – October 6, 1981
- Governor: Bill Clements
- Preceded by: Steven C. Oaks
- Succeeded by: David Dean

Chairman of the Texas Republican Party
- In office 1983–1988
- Preceded by: Chet Upham
- Succeeded by: Fred Meyer

Personal details
- Born: June 10, 1935 Houston, Texas, U.S.
- Died: February 9, 2024 (aged 88)
- Party: Republican
- Spouse: Annette Strake (m. 1959; died 2023)
- Children: 6
- Parent: George W. Strake (father)
- Education: University of Notre Dame; Harvard Graduate School of Business

George Strake Jr. (June 10, 1935 – February 9, 2024) was an American politician. He served as secretary of state of Texas from 1979 to 1981.

== Life and career ==
Strake was born in Houston, Texas. His parents were oil tycoon George W. Strake and Susan E. Kehoe. He attended the University of Notre Dame and Harvard Graduate School of Business.

Strake was an oilman.

Strake served as secretary of state of Texas from 1979 to 1981. He was also chairman of the Texas Republican Party from 1983 to 1988. In 1981, Strake ran for Lieutenant Governor of Texas, losing to incumbent Bill Hobby.

Strake died on February 9, 2024, at the age of 88.

Party political offices
Preceded by Gaylord Marshall	Republican nominee for Lieutenant Governor of Texas; 1982	Succeeded by David Davidson
