= Weinert, Texas =

- City
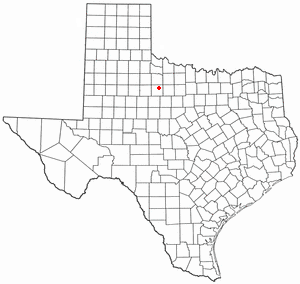
- Location of Weinert, Texas

- Coordinates: 33°19′24″N 99°40′25″W
- Country: United States
- State: Texas
- County: Haskell

Area
  - Total: 0.48 sq mi (1.25 km^{2})
  - Land: 0.48 sq mi (1.25 km^{2})
  - Water: 0 sq mi (0.00 km^{2})
- Elevation: 1,526 ft (465 m)

Population (2020)
  - Total: 172
  - Density: 356/sq mi (138/km^{2})
- Time zone: UTC-6 (Central (CST))
  - Summer (DST): UTC-5 (CDT)
- ZIP code: 76388
- Area code: 940
- FIPS code: 48-77044
- GNIS feature ID: 2412203

Weinert is a city in Haskell County, Texas, United States. The population was 172 at both the 2010 and 2020 censuses.

== Geography ==
Weinert is located in northeastern Haskell County U.S. Route 277 passes through the western side of the city, leading north 9 miles (14 km) to Munday and south 12 miles (19 km) to Haskell, the county seat.

According to the United States Census Bureau, Weinert has a total area of 0.5 square miles (1.3 km^{2}), all land.

=== Climate ===
The climate in this area is characterized by hot, humid summers and generally mild to cool winters. According to the Köppen climate classification system, Weinert has a humid subtropical climate, Cfa on climate maps.

Climate data for Weinhert, Texas (1991-2020)
| Month | Jan | Feb | Mar | Apr | May | Jun | Jul | Aug | Sep | Oct | Nov | Dec | Year |
|---|---|---|---|---|---|---|---|---|---|---|---|---|---|
| Mean daily maximum °F (°C) | 56.2 (13.4) | 60.3 (15.7) | 69.0 (20.6) | 77.9 (25.5) | 85.6 (29.8) | 92.9 (33.8) | 97.0 (36.1) | 96.3 (35.7) | 88.4 (31.3) | 78.6 (25.9) | 66.2 (19.0) | 57.3 (14.1) | 77.1 (25.1) |
| Daily mean °F (°C) | 42.9 (6.1) | 46.6 (8.1) | 55.0 (12.8) | 63.4 (17.4) | 72.5 (22.5) | 80.6 (27.0) | 84.6 (29.2) | 83.6 (28.7) | 75.8 (24.3) | 65.1 (18.4) | 53.0 (11.7) | 44.5 (6.9) | 64.0 (17.8) |
| Mean daily minimum °F (°C) | 29.6 (−1.3) | 32.8 (0.4) | 41.0 (5.0) | 48.9 (9.4) | 59.5 (15.3) | 68.4 (20.2) | 72.1 (22.3) | 71.0 (21.7) | 63.3 (17.4) | 51.6 (10.9) | 39.9 (4.4) | 31.7 (−0.2) | 50.8 (10.5) |
| Average precipitation inches (mm) | 1.05 (27) | 1.32 (34) | 1.78 (45) | 1.94 (49) | 3.28 (83) | 3.50 (89) | 2.09 (53) | 2.23 (57) | 2.83 (72) | 2.30 (58) | 1.60 (41) | 1.17 (30) | 25.09 (638) |
| Average dew point °F (°C) | 28.1 (−2.2) | 31.4 (−0.3) | 38.0 (3.3) | 45.3 (7.4) | 55.7 (13.2) | 63.2 (17.3) | 64.2 (17.9) | 63.4 (17.4) | 59.2 (15.1) | 49.3 (9.6) | 38.6 (3.7) | 30.7 (−0.7) | 47.3 (8.5) |
Source: PRISM Climate Group

== History ==
Weinert is named for Senator Ferdinand C. Weinert of Seguin. It was founded upon the 1906 construction of the Wichita Valley Railroad. The community experienced a major storm in 1909. A 1910 fire destroyed businesses for approximately one city block. The town's population exceeded 500 by 1940, though the number declined in succeeding decades due to changes in agricultural techniques and transportation.

== Demographics ==
Historical population
| Census | Pop. | Note | %± |
|---|---|---|---|
| 1910 | 779 | | — |
| 1950 | 288 | | — |
| 1960 | 251 | | −12.8% |
| 1970 | 255 | | 1.6% |
| 1980 | 253 | | −0.8% |
| 1990 | 235 | | −7.1% |
| 2000 | 177 | | −24.7% |
| 2010 | 172 | | −2.8% |
| 2020 | 172 | | 0.0% |
U.S. Decennial Census; 2020 Census

=== 2020 census ===
As of the 2020 census, Weinert had a population of 172. The median age was 51.0 years, 19.8% of residents were under 18, and 27.9% were 65 years of age or older. For every 100 females there were 100.0 males, and for every 100 females age 18 and over there were 100.0 males age 18 and over.

0.0% of residents lived in urban areas, while 100.0% lived in rural areas.

There were 79 households in Weinert, of which 36.7% had children under the age of 18 living in them. Of all households, 46.8% were married-couple households, 24.1% were households with a male householder and no spouse or partner present, and 24.1% were households with a female householder and no spouse or partner present. About 21.5% of all households were made up of individuals and 11.4% had someone living alone who was 65 years of age or older.

There were 90 housing units, of which 12.2% were vacant. The homeowner vacancy rate was 1.6% and the rental vacancy rate was 0.0%.

Racial composition as of the 2020 census
| Race | Number | Percent |
|---|---|---|
| White | 138 | 80.2% |
| Black or African American | 0 | 0.0% |
| American Indian and Alaska Native | 1 | 0.6% |
| Asian | 0 | 0.0% |
| Native Hawaiian and Other Pacific Islander | 0 | 0.0% |
| Some other race | 26 | 15.1% |
| Two or more races | 7 | 4.1% |
| Hispanic or Latino (of any race) | 45 | 26.2% |

=== 2000 census ===
As of the 2000 census, 177 people, 78 households, and 56 families resided in the city. The population density was 366.6 inhabitants per square mile (141.5/km^{2}). The 101 housing units averaged 209/sq mi (81.2/km^{2}). The racial makeup of the city was 82.5% White, 16.4% from other races, and 1.1% from two or more races. Hispanics or Latinos of any race were 19.2% of the population.

Of the 78 households, 28% had children under the age of 18 living with them, 59.0% were married couples living together, 10.3% had a female householder with no husband present, and 28.2% were not families. About 28% of all households were made up of individuals, and 17% had someone living alone who was 65 years of age or older. The average household size was 2.3 and the average family size was 2.7.

In the city, the population was distributed as 20.9% under the age of 18, 5.1% from 18 to 24, 22.6% from 25 to 44, 23.7% from 45 to 64, and 27.7% who were 65 years of age or older. The median age was 46 years. For every 100 females, there were 115.9 males. For every 100 females age 18 and over, there were 109.0 males.

The median income for a household in the city was $22,344, and for a family was $25,000. Males had a median income of $36,250 versus $18,750 for females. The per capita income for the city was $20,257. About 20.0% of families and 19.0% of the population were below the poverty line, including 28.6% of those under the age of 18 and 7.0% of those 65 or over.

== Education ==
The City of Weinert is served by the Haskell Consolidated Independent School District.

On July 1, 1990, Weinert Independent School District merged into Haskell ISD.
