= Jane Y. McCallum =

American politician and author

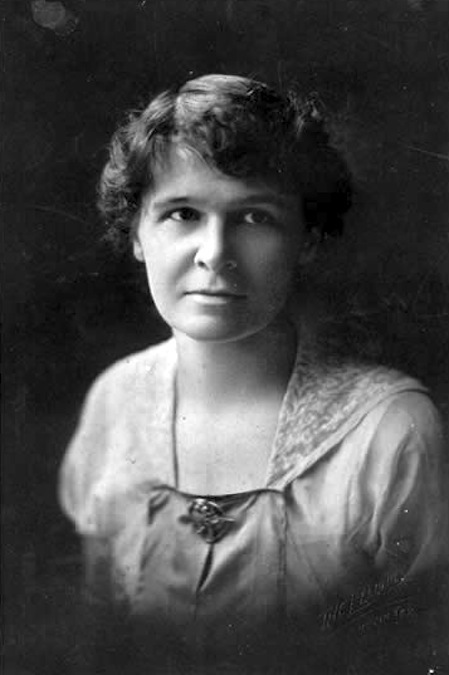
- McCallum, circa 1900

Secretary of State of Texas
- In office January 17, 1927 – January 17, 1933
- Governor: Dan Moody; Ross S. Sterling
- Preceded by: Emma Grigsby Meharg
- Succeeded by: W.W. Heath

Personal details
- Born: December 30, 1877 LaVernia, Texas, US
- Died: August 14, 1957 (aged 79)
- Resting place: Oakwood Cemetery, Austin, Texas
- Party: Democratic
- Spouse: Arthur McCallum
- Education: University of Texas at Austin (no degree)

Jane Yelvington McCallum (December 30, 1877 – August 14, 1957) was an American politician and author, a women's suffrage and Prohibition activist, and the longest-serving Secretary of State of Texas. She attended schools in Wilson County, Texas, for the most part, and studied at the University of Texas at Austin for several years. As a suffragist, she published many columns in local newspapers in support of that cause and others. She was a member of numerous organizations. In 1927, she campaigned for Dan Moody and would be appointed as the Secretary of State after his successful election as governor. After leaving the position in 1933, she remained active in writing, activism, and political and civic affairs until she died in 1957.

== Early life ==
Jane Yelvington was born December 30, 1877, in La Vernia, Texas. Her father, Alvaro Leonard Yelvington, was a county pioneer sheriff, and her mother was Mary Fullerton LeGette. Throughout her childhood, she attended county schools but also briefly attended a college in Mississippi from 1892 to 1893. In 1896, at age 18, she married Arthur McCallum, and after a series of moves, they settled in Austin, where he became school superintendent, by 1903. She attended the University of Texas at Austin for several years as one of the first mothers to attend the university, first from 1912 to 1915 and then from 1923 to 1924, though she did not receive a degree. While there, she joined Alpha Delta Pi and became the first married woman to join a sorority on that campus.

== Campaigner for suffrage ==
Early on, McCallum became active in the movement for women's suffrage and several other causes. At first, she convinced the owner of The Austin American (as of then not merged with The Statesman) to publish "Suffrage Corner", her column of constant editorials against the movement's opposition. She then joined the staff of The Statesman and worked there through World War I, publishing support for Prohibition in opposition to the newspaper's editor. By the end of the war, she had led the Austin women's effort to fundraise $700,000 as women's chairman of the fourth Liberty bond drive.

McCallum was elected president of the Austin Women Suffrage Association in 1915. She was also active in the Texas Equal Suffrage Association (TESA). Despite opposition, she gave speeches and wrote newspaper articles in support of women's right to vote while raising five children. In August 1917, McCallum and other organizers created a public demonstration against Governor James E. Ferguson. Both male and female protestors spoke for 16 hours, including McCallum, who called him the "implacable foe of woman suffrage and of every great moral issue for which women stood." The protest was timed to reach many of his supporters in town for a farming conference and contributed to a turn in the general opinion of Ferguson and his eventual resignation.

McCallum was on site in 1918 when Governor William P. Hobby signed a bill into law which allowed Texas women to vote in primary elections. After 1920, when women were able to vote, she became active in the Texas League of Women Voters. For the Texas amendment on primaries, she served as the state publicity and press manager, and for the Nineteenth Amendment, she served as the state chairman of its ratification committee. She was part of the "Petticoat Lobby", which worked to represent women's clubs and women's issues in the state. Throughout the 1920s, they pushed for legislation on "school funding, prison reform, maternal/infant health care, restrictions on child labor, stricter prohibition laws," most of which was enacted.

== Texas Secretary of State ==
In 1926, McCallum campaigned for then-attorney general Dan Moody's run for state governor, hosting the campaign headquarters in her own home. She and her colleagues hired a secretary, and they sent "letters, editorials, and pamphlets" to Texas women asking them to vote for Moody, who would later win the election against incumbent Miriam A. Ferguson, wife of former governor James E. Ferguson who had been attempting to win back control of the office under his wife's name.

McCallum was first appointed to the position of Secretary of State in January 1927 by Governor Dan Moody. The next Governor, Ross S. Sterling, kept her on in the position, and she continued serving until 1933. While serving in this office, she discovered an original copy of the Texas Declaration of Independence in a vault and published a book, Women Pioneers, on the lives of early American women leaders. As in her earlier activism, she supported legislation on Prohibition, prison reform, and child labor, and she published a pamphlet criticizing former Governor Miriam A. Ferguson's numerous pardons of prisoners.

== Later activism ==
Throughout her life, McCallum remained involved in politics and civic matters, giving speeches and making public and radio appearances. She continued to publish her column, now called "Woman and Her Ways", in the Austin American-Statesman until the late 1940s. During the 1940 presidential election, she served as an elector; in 1942 and 1944, she served as a state Democratic committeewoman, first for the Twentieth Senatorial District and then for the Tenth United States Congressional District. She was appointed to Austin's first city planning commission that same year, and the following January, in 1945, she protested with and led the Women's Committee on Educational Freedom to the state capitol, protesting the firing of her alma mater's president Homer Rainey after his opposition to the dismissal of faculty accused of being communists. In 1954, she became the first female commissioner of a Travis County Grand Jury after women won the right to serve on juries.

== Death and legacy ==
McCallum died August 14, 1957, and was buried in Oakwood Cemetery, in Austin.

In 1989, her diaries and writing were compiled by Janet G. Humphrey in a book called A Texas Suffragist: Diaries and Writing of Jane Y. McCallum which collected her thoughts and activities as an activist and politician. Her diaries were later purchased by the University of Texas at Austin in 1990.

== Publications ==
- McCallum, Jane Y. (1929). Women pioneers. Johnson Publishing Company.
- McCallum, Jane Y. (1950). All Texians Were Not Males (unpublished except for excerpts). Texas Parade.

Preceded by Emma Grigsby Meharg	Secretary of State of Texas; 1927-1933	Succeeded by W. W. Heath
