= Rolando Pablos =

American politician

111th Secretary of State of Texas
- In office January 6, 2017 – December 15, 2018
- Governor: Greg Abbott
- Preceded by: Carlos Cascos
- Succeeded by: David Whitley

Commissioner of the Public Utility Commission of Texas
- In office September 20, 2011 – March 1, 2013
- Governor: Rick Perry
- Preceded by: Barry T. Smitherman
- Succeeded by: Brandy Marty Marquez

Personal details
- Born: September 26, 1967 (age 59) Sonora, Mexico
- Party: Republican
- Education: St. Mary's University, Texas (BS, JD); University of Texas at San Antonio (MBA); University of Houston (MA)

Rolando Burgoa Pablos (born September 26, 1967) is an American executive, attorney, and Republican politician from Texas. He was sworn in as the 111th Secretary of State of Texas on January 5, 2017. On December 6, 2018, Pablos announced his resignation as Secretary of State effective December 15. In August 2024, Pablos announced his intention to run for Mayor of San Antonio and officially filed for a place on the May 3, 2025 ballot on January 29, 2025. During the May 3, 2025 general election, Pablos would advance to the June 7, 2025 runoff. He lost that election to Gina Ortiz Jones.

== Early life and education ==
Born in Sonora, Mexico, Pablos grew up in Ciudad Juárez, Chihuahua, and El Paso, Texas. He graduated from Cathedral High School in El Paso.

In 1992, Pablos graduated from St. Mary's University in San Antonio, Texas, with a bachelor's degree in biology. He then earned a Master of Business Administration from the University of Texas at San Antonio, a master's in Hospitality Management from the Hilton College of Hotel and Restaurant Management at the University of Houston, and in 1998 a Juris Doctor from St. Mary's University School of Law.

Pablos was described as the "driving force" behind the creation of the San Antonio campus of Hilton College, at which he formerly was adjunct lecturer of hospitality law.

== Career ==
Pablos was CEO of the Borderplex Alliance and left in 2016. Pablos formerly was a Texas Public Utility Commissioner and then chaired the Texas Racing Commission. He was nominated to was Texas Secretary of State by Republican Governor Greg Abbott and confirmed by the Texas Senate on February 14, 2017.

In March 2017, Pablos made his first international diplomatic mission to Mexico City, during which he affirmed the strong economic relationship between Texas and Mexico. After the trip, Pablos said he was "highly encouraged" by his meetings and discussions with both private and public sector officials, including representatives from the SENER, Mexico's energy ministry.

Pablos co-founded Uriel Americas and was chief executive officer of the Borderplex Alliance, a bi-national economic developmental corporation.

In August 2017, as a new school year loomed, Pablos urged high school principals to register qualified students for voting. The principals, noted Pablos, are required under the state election code to serve as deputy voter registrars, in which capacity they are expected to distribute voter registration applications to students who will turn eighteen by election day.

Writing in World Oil magazine in November 2017, Pablos expressed optimism that Mexico's energy reforms enacted in 2013 would provide Texas and Mexico "a new opportunity" to collaborate in cross-border energy trade, through what he calls the "Texas-Mexico Energy Nexus," adding that "the potential is enormous for Texas energy leaders to expand in a newly privatized Mexican energy market." Pablos had made cross-border energy integration the focus of a Texas Border Trade Advisory Committee meeting earlier that year.

In March 2018, Pablos welcomed Aga Khan IV to Texas during his Diamond jubilee visit to the United States.

After serving as Texas Secretary of State, Pablos returned to the private sector before launching his campaign to be Mayor of San Antonio after Ron Nirenberg was term-limited. On May 3, 2025, Pablos would advance to the June 7 runoff after winning 16.61% of the vote. He lost the runoff to Gina Ortiz Jones

Government offices
Preceded by Barry T. Smitherman	Commissioner of the Public Utility Commission of Texas; 2011–2013	Succeeded by Brandy Marty Marquez
Political offices
Preceded by Carlos Cascos	Secretary of State of Texas; 2017–2018	Succeeded by David Whitley
