= David Whitley (politician) =

American attorney and consultant

Secretary of State of Texas Acting
- In office December 17, 2018 – May 27, 2019
- Governor: Greg Abbott
- Preceded by: Rolando Pablos
- Succeeded by: Ruth R. Hughs

Personal details
- Born: Alice, Texas, U.S.
- Party: Republican
- Education: University of Texas at Austin (BS, JD)

Gregory David Whitley is an American attorney and consultant to the Republican Party who asked to be appointed to the position of Acting Secretary of State of Texas by Texas Governor Greg Abbott. He served from December 2018 to May 2019. Whitley's confirmation was marred by his miscalculation calling for the investigation of 95,000 voters he identified as illegal. Republican President Donald Trump used this alleged information to claim widespread illegal voting in the United States. Whitley could not muster enough votes in the Texas Senate to be confirmed and he resigned shortly before their session ended.

== Career ==
Originally from Alice, Texas, Whitley earned his bachelor's degree and Juris Doctor from the University of Texas at Austin. In 2004, he began working for Abbott, who was at that time Attorney General of Texas. When Abbott was elected Governor of Texas, he appointed Whitley as Acting Secretary of State to succeed Rolando Pablos, on December 17, 2018.

As Secretary of State preceding the 2020 United States presidential election in Texas, Whitley identified 95,000 voters who he claimed may be noncitizens and sent the names to county election boards in January 2019 for reconsideration and validation that they were indeed eligible to vote. It was found that tens of thousands of the individuals on the list actually were valid voters, and several lawsuits were filed to stop the attempted voter purge. One election official in Fort Bend was quoted that while more than 8,000 voters were on the list to be challenged, only two were actually found. Fred Biery, a judge on the United States District Court for the Western District of Texas, blocked further removal.

President Trump seized upon Whitley’s report that there was widespread voter fraud in Texas, calling it the "tip of the iceberg". As an appointed position, the Senate Committee on Nominations in the Texas Senate advanced Whitley's re-nomination on a 4–3, party line vote; however, all 12 Democrats in the Texas Senate opposed Whitley's confirmation, which denied him the two-thirds vote required for confirmation. Unable to be re-nominated, Whitley resigned as acting secretary of state on May 27, 2019, the same day he would have been removed from office if not confirmed.

Political offices
Preceded by Rolando Pablos	Secretary of State of Texas; Acting; 2018–2019	Succeeded by Joe Esparza; Acting
