= David Dean (Texas politician) =

American lobbyist

Secretary of State of Texas
- In office October 1981 – January 1983
- Governor: Bill Clements
- Preceded by: George Strake Jr.
- Succeeded by: John Fainter

Personal details
- Education: J.D., University of Texas; BBA, Southern Methodist University
- Profession: Lawyer; lobbyist
- Awards: DHumLitt, Dallas Baptist University

David Dean is an American lawyer and lobbyist who was Secretary of State of Texas from 1981 to 1983.

== Early life and education ==
David Dean attended St. Mark's School of Texas and subsequently received a BBA degree from Southern Methodist University. He went on to earn a J.D. from the University of Texas.

== Career ==
Dean was general counsel to the office of the Governor of Texas under Dolph Briscoe, a Democrat. In the 1978 election, Briscoe lost the Democratic Party nomination to John Hill, after which Dean joined the successful gubernatorial campaign of Republican Bill Clements as deputy campaign manager and chair of the Democrats and Independents for Clements Committee. Dean resumed his service as general counsel under Clements and was eventually appointed by the governor as Texas Secretary of State, an office he held from October 1981 to January 1983.

After leaving public service he established the influential lobbying firm Dean International, and was once referred to by the Dallas Business Journal as a "political powerhouse".

During the 1990s he lobbied on behalf of Irving, Texas, and was credited with securing lucrative state grants that transformed the city into a transportation mecca. Later, he worked trying to secure funding for the Trans-Texas Corridor. From 2012 to 2015, Dean International lobbied on behalf of Garland, Texas.

As of 2023 Dean serves as chairman of the North Texas Crime Commission.

== Personal life ==
Dean is married and has a daughter. In 2000, he purchased a historic home in the Swiss Avenue Historic District for preservation and residence. Dean and his wife are art collectors and own pieces by American Southwest artists including John Nieto and Desmond Blair.

He received the Russell H. Perry Free Enterprise Award, as well as an honorary Doctor of Humanities, both from Dallas Baptist University.
