= Myra McDaniel =

American politician (1932–2010)

Myra McDaniel (December 13, 1932 – February 25, 2010) was the first African American to be the Secretary of State of Texas.

== Life ==
McDaniel was born in Philadelphia, Pennsylvania to Eva and Toronto Atwell. She attended the Philadelphia School for Girls. In 1954, she went on to receive her bachelor's degree in English from the University of Pennsylvania. In 1975, she received her Juris Doctor (J.D.) degree from the University of Texas School of Law at Austin. She married Dr. Reuben R. McDaniel in 1955, who was a Professor Management Science and Information Systems at the University of Texas at Austin. Myra McDaniel died of lung cancer on February 25, 2010.

== Career ==
After graduating in 1954 from the University of Pennsylvania, she worked at Baldwin Wallace College and Indiana University. She then went to the University of Texas School of Law, where she received her J.D. After receiving her J.D., she worked at the Texas Attorney General's office. She eventually became the Chief of the taxation division. Afterward, she entered private practice. However, she was appointed as General Counsel to the Governor of Texas by then-governor Mark White. In 1984, she went on to become the Secretary of State of Texas, and became the first African American to hold the position. With that appointment, she also became the then-highest-appointed African American to ever serve in the Texas government. She went on to enter private practice again in 1987, and at her firm, became the first African American woman to lead a major law firm as a managing partner.

== Honors and awards ==
In 2017, McDaniel was awarded the Virgil C. Lott medal by the University of Texas School of Law.

Political offices
Preceded by John Fainter	Secretary of State of Texas; 1984–1987	Succeeded by Jack Rains
