= Milton M. Holland =

Medal of Honor recipient (1844–1910)

- Sergeant Major Milton M. Holland
- Born: Milton Murray Holland; August 1, 1844; Carthage, Republic of Texas
- Died: May 15, 1910 (aged 65)
- Burial place: Arlington National Cemetery
- Military career
- Allegiance: United States (Union)
- Branch: United States Army
- Service years: 1862–1865
- Rank: Sergeant major
- Unit: 5th U.S. Colored Infantry Regiment
- Conflicts: American Civil War; *Battle of Chaffin's Farm
- Awards: Medal of Honor
- Other work: Founder and president, Alpha Insurance Company

Milton Murray Holland (August 1, 1844 – May 15, 1910) was a Union Army soldier during the American Civil War and a recipient of America's highest military decoration—the Medal of Honor—for his actions at the Battle of Chaffin's Farm.

== Biography ==
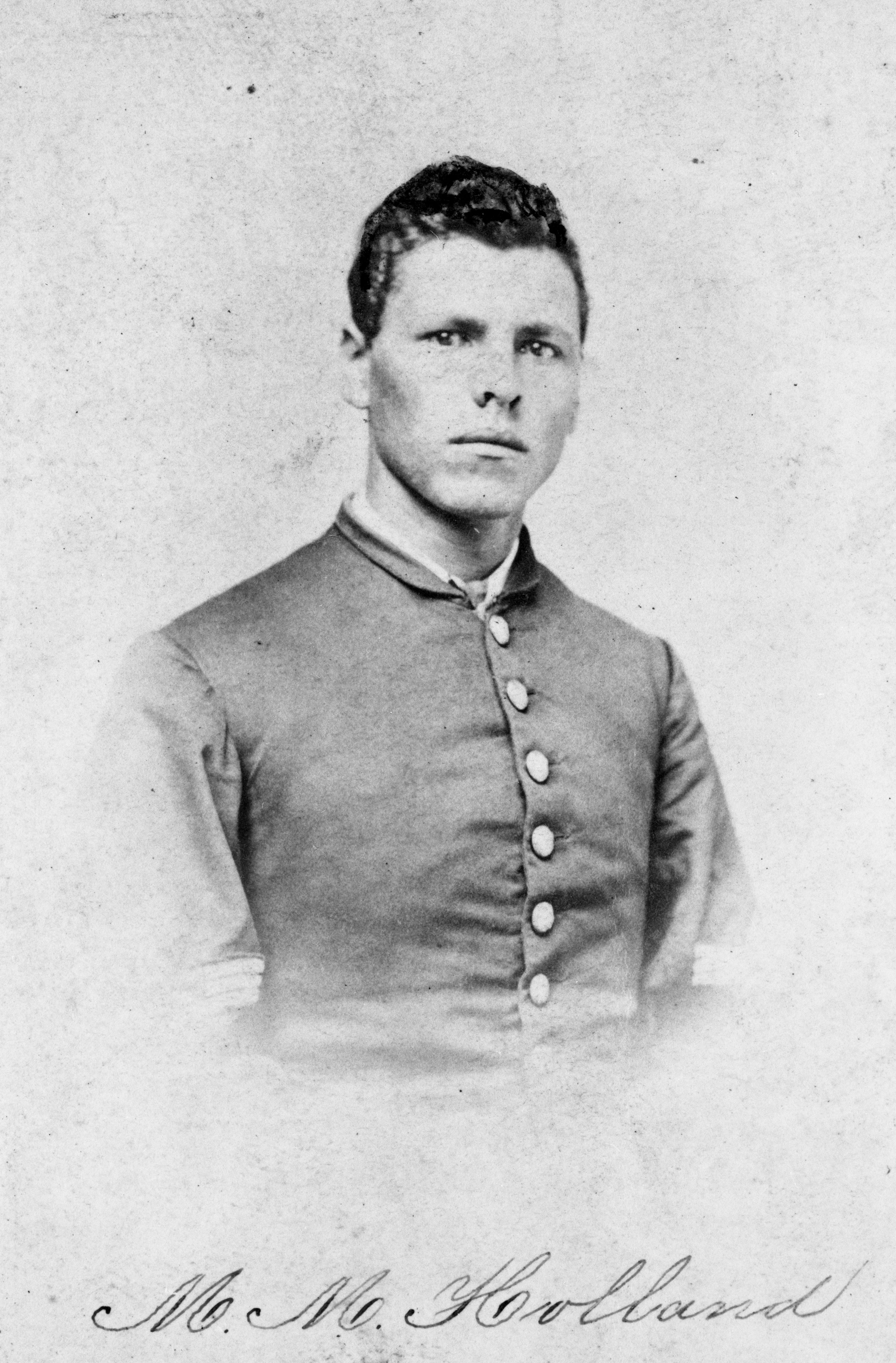
Photograph from 1863 or 1864

Holland was born as the son of white slaveowner Bird Holland (killed in action at the Battle of Pleasant Hill) and Matilda, an enslaved African-American woman.The slave owner was his uncle. His father had to purchase him and his 2 brothers so they could be free. Texas law states that freed slaves may not live in the country, so he paid all the money for Holland and his brothers for an education and resources to live and sent them to Ohio. There, he studied and became a shoemakers apprentice. Later, he repeatedly tried to join the military but they rejected him due to his race. Eventually, he joined the army from Athens, Ohio. At the Athens County Fairgrounds he signed to the recruitment rolls 149 young black men and raised what was to become Company C of the 5th United States Colored Infantry.

He was serving as a sergeant major (a temporary assignment) in the 5th USCI when his unit participated in the Battle of Chaffin's Farm on September 29, 1864 in Virginia. It was here that he was awarded his Medal of Honor for his display of heroism. During the battle, all of his white commanding officers were either wounded or killed, leading him to take charge of Company C and attempt to breach through confederate lines. The confederates were holding their line before this and looked like they were going to successfully push out the union, when Milton Holland took control and turned it around. Even when he was injured he still kept fighting with his men because he wanted to win the battle with them. Eventually, the Confederates had to run and retreat and the Union grew control of a key fort. Three days before the end of the war, on April 6, 1865, he was issued the Medal of Honor for his actions at Chaffin's Farm. Although this is a honor, one of the main reasons of why he got the award was because the US War department did not allow black men to have any sort of high position in the military. After the battle, Major general Bejamin Butler tried to promote him to captain due to his bravery and heroism, along with many other Union officials. However, the War department strictly did not allow this to happen. Furious by this, general Benjamin Butler worked around this and gave him the newly made medal of honor. He left the army in September 1865.

Holland's wife was Virginia W. Dickey. Milton Holland died from a heart attack at the age of 65 and was buried in Arlington National Cemetery, Arlington County, Virginia.

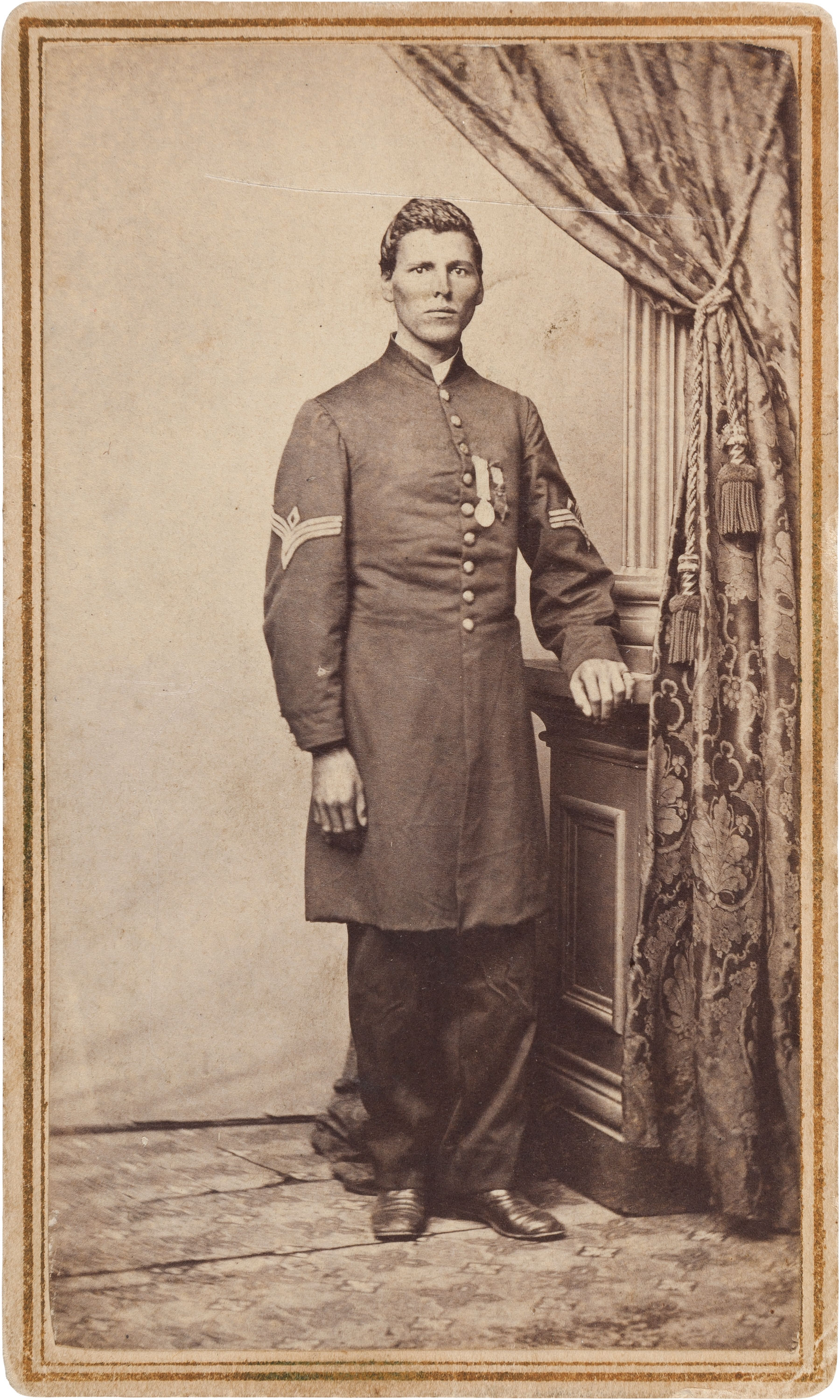
Wearing a large medal, could be the Medal of Honor which would place this photo in 1865 when he was awarded the medal.

== Medal of Honor citation ==
- Rank and organization: Sergeant Major, 5th U.S. Colored Troops.
- Place and date: At Chaffin's Farm, Virginia, September 29, 1864.
- Entered service at: Athens, Ohio.
- Born: 1844, Holland Quarters, Panola County, Texas.
- Date of issue: April 6, 1865.

Citation:

Took command of Company C, after all the officers had been killed or wounded, and gallantly led it.

== See also ==
- List of Medal of Honor recipients
- List of American Civil War Medal of Honor recipients: G–L
- List of African American Medal of Honor recipients
