= Rudolph A. Weinert =

American politician

Member of the Texas Senate from the 19th district
- In office September 28, 1936 – January 8, 1963
- Preceded by: Welly K. Hopkins
- Succeeded by: Walter Richter

Personal details
- Born: December 19, 1894
- Died: January 24, 1974 (aged 79) Seguin, Texas, U.S.
- Party: Democratic
- Spouse: Johnnye Ponton (m. 1905; died 1965)
- Relatives: Ferdinand C. Weinert (Son)

Rudolph A. Weinert (December 19, 1894 – January 24, 1974) was a politician from Seguin, Texas, who served in the Texas Senate for 27 years.

== Early life and family ==
Rudolph A. Weinert was born December 19, 1894. Weinert was married to Johnnye Ponton from 1905 until her death in 1973. They had one daughter, Johnnye Jean Weinert Lovett.

== Career ==
Weinert was a Democratic politician from Seguin, Texas. He served in the Texas Senate for 27 years from 1936 to 1963. Weinert received 29 votes and was duly declared Dean of the Senate in 1947. Weinert died January 24, 1974.

Texas Senate
Preceded by Welly K. Hopkins	Texas State Senator from District 19 (Seguin); 1936–1963	Succeeded by Walter Richter
