= Ferdinand C. Weinert =

American politician (1853–1939)

Texas Senate, District 21 Texas House, District 80, 91, 97
- In office 1893–1935

Texas Secretary of State
- In office June 1913 – November 1914
- Governor: Oscar Branch Colquitt
- Preceded by: John L. Wortham
- Succeeded by: D. A. Gregg

Personal details
- Born: July 14, 1853 New Braunfels, Texas, U.S.
- Died: February 19, 1939 (aged 85) Austin, Texas, U.S.
- Party: Democratic
- Spouse: Clara Bading
- Relatives: Rudolph A. Weinert (Son) Mayor Hilmar H. Weinert (Son) Hilda Blumberg Weinert (Daughter in law)

Ferdinand C. Weinert (July 14, 1853 – February 19, 1939) was a merchant and politician from Seguin, Texas, who served in the Texas Legislature, four years in the Senate and four terms in the House, and well as serving as Secretary of State.

== Early life and family ==
Ferdinand C. Weinert was born in New Braunfels, Texas, on July 14, 1853, raised in Guadalupe County, Texas and schooled in New Braunfels. He married Clara Bading, and had seven children, making his residence in Seguin and Austin, Texas.

== Career ==
Weinert worked in various mercantile businesses in New Braunfels, Austin, and San Antonio. He was elected justice of the peace in 1875. Then he became county commissioner and county judge of Guadalupe County. He served in the Texas House 1893-1895, 1903-1905, 1931-1935 and Texas Senate 1909-1913. Weinert was appointed Secretary of State June 1, 1913. Weinert died on February 19, 1939, and was buried in the family cemetery in Seguin.

== Legacy ==
Weinert, Texas in Haskell County, Texas is named for Senator Ferdinand C. Weinert of Seguin, who led many Seguin citizens to settle there on a last fragment of the once open frontier. Weinert, Texas on FM 20, in Guadalupe County is named for the Weinert family. The Weinert House in Seguin is a restored residence of the Senator. F.C.Weinert Bridge, Weinert School and Weinert Street are also located in Seguin, Texas.

Texas Senate
Preceded by Joseph Faust	Texas State Senator from District 21 (Seguin); 1909-1913	Succeeded by James A. Harley
Preceded by John L. Wortham	Secretary of State of Texas; 1913-1914	Succeeded by D. A. Gregg
