= C. J. Bartlett =

British historian and biographer (1931–2008)

Christopher John Bartlett (12 October 1931 – 8 July 2008) was a British historian and biographer.

== Biography ==
Bartlett was born in Bournemouth and educated at University College, Exeter, where he gained a BA in history in 1953. He was awarded a PhD in international history by the London School of Economics in 1956. From 1957 to 1959, he was an assistant lecturer at the University of Edinburgh. He was then a lecturer in modern history at the University of the West Indies (1959–1962) and Queen's College, Dundee(1962–1968). Afterwards, he was reader in international history (1968–1978). In 1978, he was appointed Professor of International History at the University of Dundee, from which he retired in 1996.

He died in Bristol on 8 July 2008, at the age of 76.

== Works ==
- Bartlett, Christopher John (1963). Great Britain and Sea Power, 1815-1853. Oxford: Clarendon Press.
- Bartlett, Christopher John (1966). Castlereagh. New York: Charles Scribner's Sons.
- Bartlett, Christopher John, ed. (1969). Britain Pre-eminent: Studies in British World Influence in the Nineteenth Century. London: Macmillan.
- Bartlett, Christopher John (1972). The Long Retreat: A Short History Defence Policy, 1945-1970. London: Macmillan.
- Bartlett, Christopher John (1974). The Rise and Fall of the Pax Americana. London: Paul Elek.
- Bartlett, Christopher John (1977). A History of Postwar Britain, 1945-1974. London: Longmans.
