= Secretary of State of Texas =

Member of the executive department of the state of Texas

- Seal of the Texas secretary of state
- Incumbent; Robert Howden since July 18, 2026
- Appointer: The governor with Senate advice and consent
- Inaugural holder: Samuel Price Carson
- Formation: March 18, 1836

The secretary of state of Texas is one of the six members of the executive department of the State of Texas in the United States. Under the Constitution of Texas, the appointment is made by the governor of Texas, with confirmation by the Texas Senate.

The officeholder is the chief elections officer, the protocol officer for state and international matters, as well as the liaison for the governor on Mexican and border matters.

The secretary of state offices are in the James Earl Rudder State Office Building at 1019 Brazos Street in Austin; the main building handles business and public filings, statutory documents, administrative code open meetings and the UCC. The secretary of state elections office is on the second floor of the James Earl Rudder Building. The executive offices are in Room 1E.8 in the Texas State Capitol.

== Duties ==
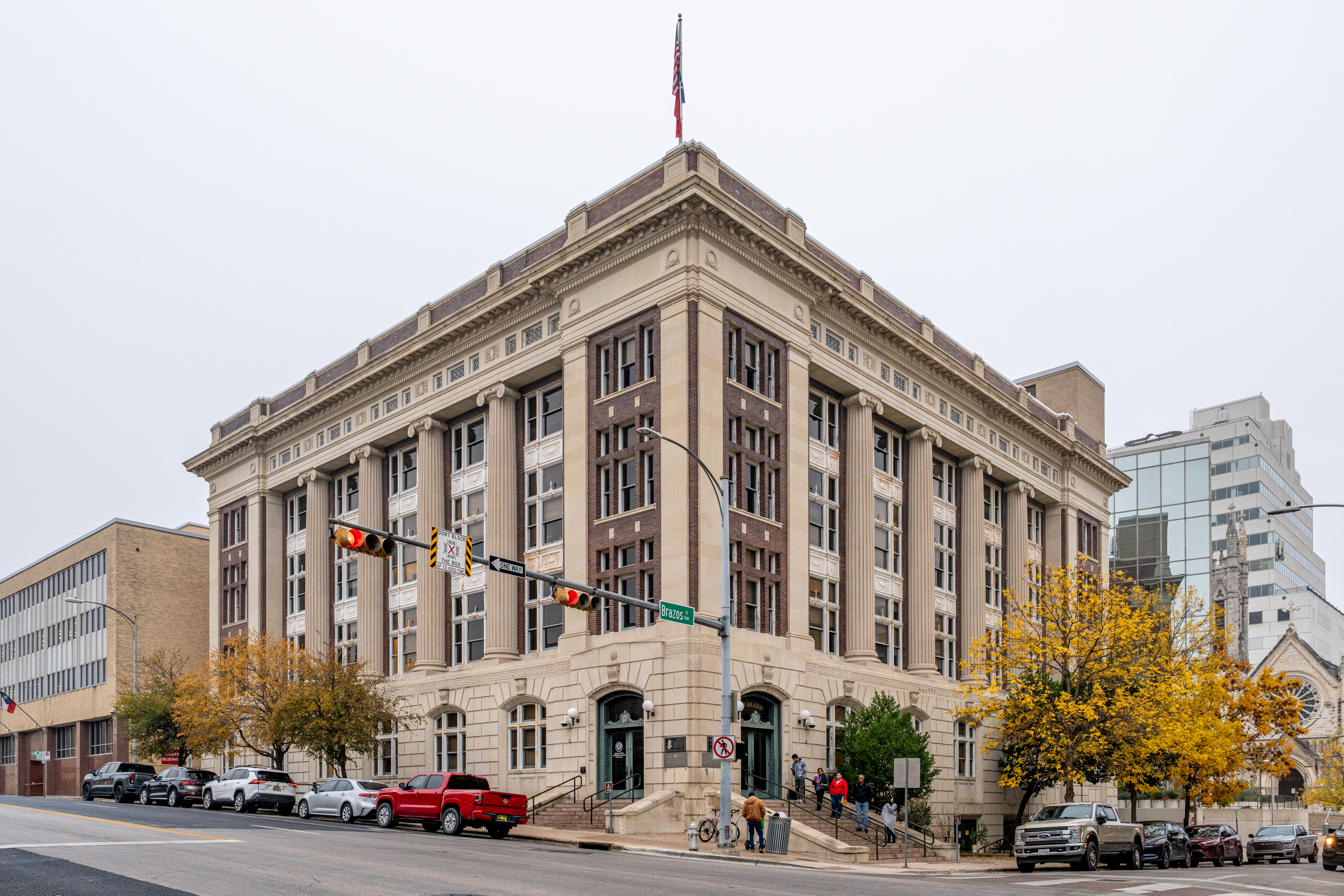
The James Earl Rudder State Office Building, housing Secretary of State offices, is a National Registered Historic Place.

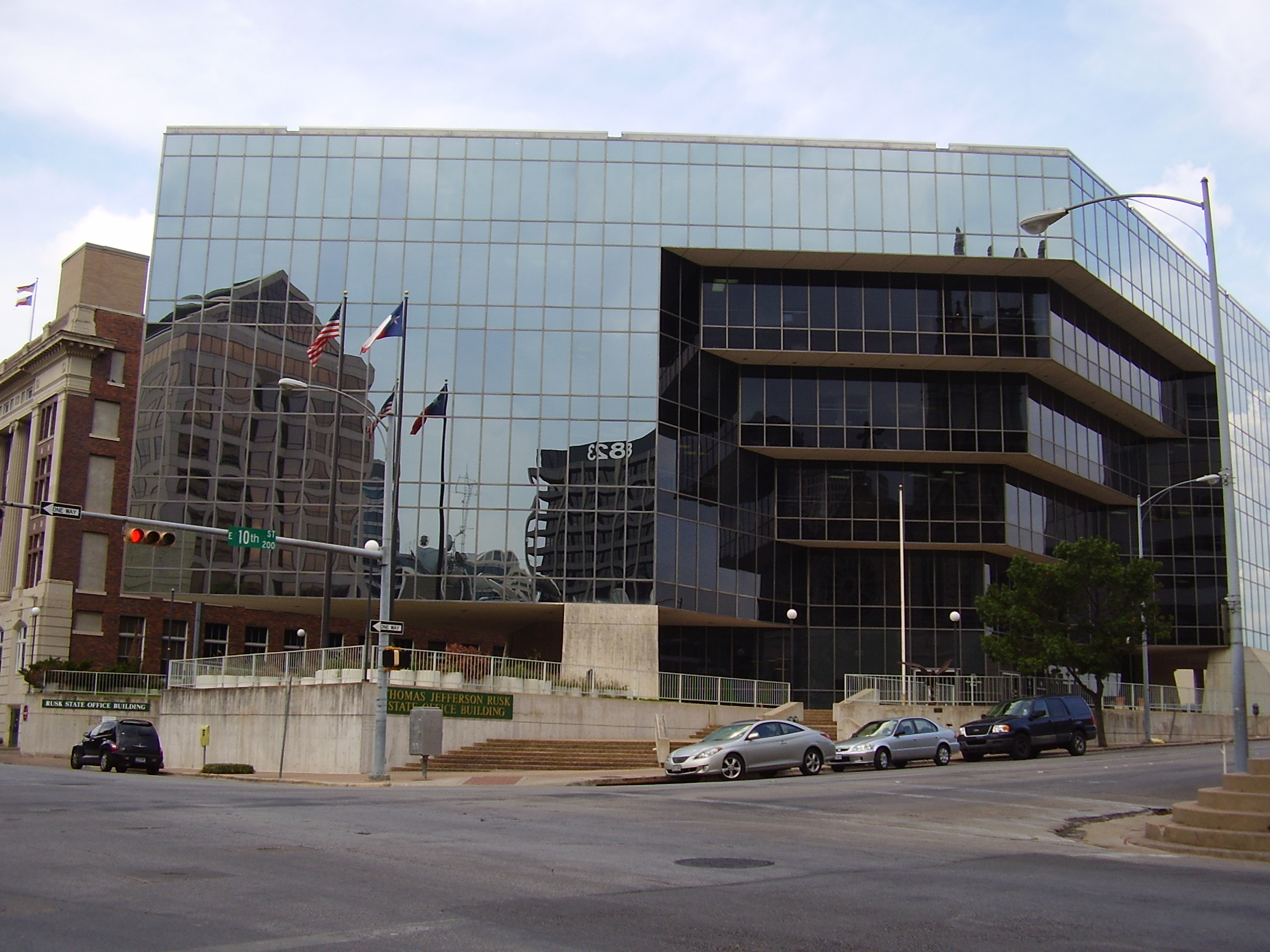
The Thomas Jefferson Rusk State Office Building has the elections office.

Under the Texas Constitution the secretary of state is, with the governor, the lieutenant governor, the comptroller of public accounts, the commissioner of the Office of General Land and the attorney general, one of the six members of the Executive Department. Of these offices all are elected by the voters in statewide elections except the secretary of state, who is nominated by the governor and confirmed by the Senate.

The secretary of state administers the Texas Election Code and maintains public filings; the officeholder is the keeper of the Seal of the State of Texas. The office also oversees business entity status in Texas, including processing reinstatements of forfeited or terminated entities. The Secretary of State also issues appointments for notaries public. In the early 2020s, secretaries of state began to prioritize elections over other duties, such as economic development and international relations; Secretary John B. Scott stated that he believed elections would remain the office's top priority for the rest of his lifetime.

== History ==
The "Father of Texas", Stephen F. Austin, was appointed Secretary of State of the Republic of Texas by President Sam Houston in 1836.

Since then, Texas became a state of the United States in 1845 and there have been 115 Secretaries of State.

== See also ==
- List of secretaries of state of Texas
- List of company registers
