= Dennis Bonnen =

Businessman and Texas state legislator

Speaker of the Texas House of Representatives
- In office January 8, 2019 – January 12, 2021
- Preceded by: Joe Straus
- Succeeded by: Dade Phelan

Speaker pro tempore of the Texas House of Representatives
- In office January 31, 2013 – January 8, 2019
- Leader: Joe Straus
- Preceded by: Beverly Woolley
- Succeeded by: Joe Moody

Member of the Texas House of Representatives from the 25th district
- In office January 14, 1997 – January 12, 2021
- Preceded by: Jack Harris
- Succeeded by: Cody Vasut

Personal details
- Born: Dennis Higgins Bonnen; March 3, 1972 (age 54) Angleton, Texas, U.S.
- Party: Republican
- Spouse: Kimberly Bonnen
- Children: 2
- Relatives: Greg Bonnen (brother)
- Education: St. Edward's University (BA)

Dennis Higgins Bonnen (born March 3, 1972) is an American businessman and politician who served as the speaker of the Texas House of Representatives from 2019 to 2021. A Republican, Bonnen represented District 25 of the Texas House from 1997 to 2021. In 2013, then-Speaker Joe Straus appointed Bonnen as Speaker Pro Tempore, presiding over the House in the Speaker's absence. In January 2019, Bonnen was elected Speaker. He did not seek re-election in 2020.

== Early life, education, and career ==
Born in Angleton, Texas, in the Greater Houston area, to attorney David and homemaker Matina Bonnen, as a child Bonnen was diagnosed with dyslexia at Texas Children's Hospital. He struggled with the condition in his childhood education, spending his fourth grade year in a special school that used phonics-based techniques. Nevertheless, he graduated from Angleton High School in 1990, and received a B.A. in Political Science in 1994 from St. Edward's University in Austin, Texas. Bonnen worked in the Washington, D.C. office of Congressman Greg Laughlin, worked for the Can Manufacturers Institute, became the general manager of a computer business called MDS, and "traveled the nation in 1995 working on the Bob Dole presidential campaign".

In December 1995, Bonnen announced his candidacy in the Republican primary to succeed state representative Jack Harris, who was retiring from the legislature to run for a county commission seat. As a candidate, Bonnen sought to reduce government regulation of business and education, allowing schools greater flexibility in establishing their curriculum, budget, and teaching methods. Bonnen also supported sending misbehaving students to boot camp facilities, and eliminating parole for criminals, to be paid for by returning to the work farm system. After winning second place in the four-way primary race by just ten votes, Bonnen won an April 1996 run-off election to clinch the Republican nomination. He beat Democrat Tim Miller to win the seat in November 1996. becoming the youngest member in the legislature at that time.

== Legislative career ==
As a legislator Bonnen was active in the community, for example serving as the keynote speaker at the Brazoria County Peace Officers Association awards in August 1997, and at the Brazoria County Youth Conference the following month. He spoke out in defense of the county detention center against allegations of improper use of force, with Bonnen characterizing proposed legislation as a state effort to usurp local government. Bonnen ran unopposed in 1998, and was reelected over the next two decades, during which he "earned a reputation as a pugnacious lawmaker". His personal struggle with dyslexia also served as a cornerstone for many of his policy initiatives and public service endeavors.

Bonnen secured passage of legislation to create a pilot project allowing Brazosport College, Midland College, and South Texas College to offer limited four-year degrees in 2003, and to remove the pilot status of these degree grants in 2007. Also in 2007, Bonnen gained national attention for authoring Texas House Bill 1098 to overturn a controversial executive order by then-Governor Rick Perry mandating administration of the newly developed HPV vaccine to sixth-grade girls. The legislation passed with a veto-proof majority in both chambers of the Texas legislature.

=== House leadership ===
In 2013, Bonnen was appointed by Speaker Joe Straus as the Speaker Pro Tempore, in which capacity he acted as the presiding officer of the House in the Speaker's absence, during the 83rd, 84th and 85th session of the Texas legislature, from 2013 to 2018. He also served as chairman of the Ways and Means Committee. He previously served as chairman of the Sunset Advisory Commission and the House Special Purpose Districts Committee, and as vice chair of the Joint Committee of Oversight of Higher Education Governance, Excellence & Transparency. He also served on the Natural Resources Committee. That year, Phyllis Schlafly's Eagle Forum, managed in Texas by Cathie Adams, a former state chairman of the Texas Republican Party, rated Bonnen 87 percent favorable. The Young Conservatives of Texas gave him a cumulative career score of 66 percent.

In 2015, Bonnen authored legislation deemed an emergency item by Governor Abbott to keep the Texas National Guard troops at the border, increase staff at the Department of Public Safety, and establish a transnational crime center on the border to analyze crime data. Bonnen voted against a taxpayer-funded breakfast program for public schools, though the measure passed the House, 73–58. He co-sponsored legislation to provide marshals for school security as a separate category of law enforcement officials. He co-sponsored an extension of the franchise tax exemption to certain businesses. Bonnen voted to prohibit texting while driving, and to require narcotics testing for recipients of unemployment compensation. He co-sponsored bills forbidding state enforcement of federal firearms regulations, allowing college and university officials to carry concealed weapons in the name of campus security, and reducing the time required for an individual to procure training to obtain a concealed handgun license; the latter measure cleared the House, 116–30. He did not vote on a bill establishing term limits for certain state officials, and the resolution failed on the House floor. He authored HB 1914, the passage of which increased the allowable time between parole hearings for the egregious crimes of capital murder and aggravated sexual assault. In 2018, he received an A rating by the National Rifle Association.

=== Speakership ===
On November 12, 2018, Bonnen announced he had 109 votes to be the next Texas House Speaker, more than the 76 votes needed for election. On January 8, 2019, Bonnen was unanimously elected by the Texas House of Representatives to serve as Speaker of the House. In his opening remarks as Speaker of the House, Bonnen declared school finance legislation to be the number one priority for the 86th legislative session, in addition to school safety, combating human trafficking and providing property tax relief. The Texas House passed House Bill 3, its $11.6 billion school finance measure, which includes about $4.5 billion in new spending for education reforms, $2 billion for teacher pay raises, and over $5 billion to lower property tax bills of Texans. Among the elements of the school finance overhaul supported by Bonnen was a proposal to provide "additional funding to schools to help students with dyslexia".

The Legislature also passed legislation to eliminate the rape kit backlog, slow the growth of property taxes, and improve emergency preparedness and disaster response. On June 21, 2019, Bonnen joined Governor Greg Abbott and Lieutenant Governor Dan Patrick at a press conference to announce that Texas would deploy an additional 1,000 Texas National Guard troops to the border amid the migrant surge.

Bonnen apologized following a 2019 controversy in which Michael Quinn Sullivan, the president of conservative advocacy group Empower Texans, secretly recorded Bonnen making negative comments about other legislators, and offering the group press credentials providing floor access in exchange for their working against moderate Republican members. On October 22, 2019, Bonnen announced that he would not seek re-election, paving the way for a new House speaker in the next session of the House. An investigation by the Texas Rangers ultimately concluded that Bonnen did not break any laws in the exchange.

=== Issues ===
Bonnen voted in support of legislation to ban sanctuary cities in Texas, legalize open carry, authorize concealed carry on college campuses, require Voter ID, permit religious organizations to decline to perform marriage services, require the Texas Rangers to investigate public corruption, and require colleges and universities to fund student centers for family and traditional values. In 2019, he voted in support of House Bill 3, legislation that invested an additional $4.5 billion in education, $2 billion for teacher pay raises, and $5 billion in property tax relief. He also voted for HJR 38 to authorize a constitutional amendment banning a state income tax, a measure that passed the House 100–42. Texas Monthly named Bonnen as a Best Lawmaker in June 2019 for his work as Speaker of the Texas House of Representative during Texas' 86th Legislative Session. The Conservative Roundtable of Texas rated Bonnen a 94 percent on their Conservative Effectiveness Index in 2017, a 100 percent in 2015, and a 100 percent in 2012.

== Other activities ==
Outside of his work in the legislature, Bonnen entered the field of banking in the mid-2000s, "becoming president, CEO and chairman of Heritage Bank in 2008". Bonnen remained in that role until 2019, when Heritage Bank was acquired by Third Coast Bank, with Bonnen becoming vice chairman of Third Coast Bank. In 2023, Bonnen co-founded the strategic consulting firm Second Floor Strategies.

In 2009, the Houston Business Journal named Bonnen one of their "40 Under 40". In 2013, he was inducted into the Angleton Independent School District Hall of Fame, and in 2015 was honored as the 2014-15 Brazosport Friend of the College.

Texas House of Representatives
Preceded by Jack Harris	Member of the Texas House of Representatives from the 25th district 1997–2021	Succeeded by Cody Vasut
Preceded by Beverly Woolley	Speaker pro tempore of the Texas House of Representatives; 2013–2019	Succeeded by Joe Moody
Political offices
Preceded by Joe Straus	Speaker of the Texas House of Representatives; 2019–2021	Succeeded by Dade Phelan
