= Steve Munisteri =

American lawyer (born 1957)

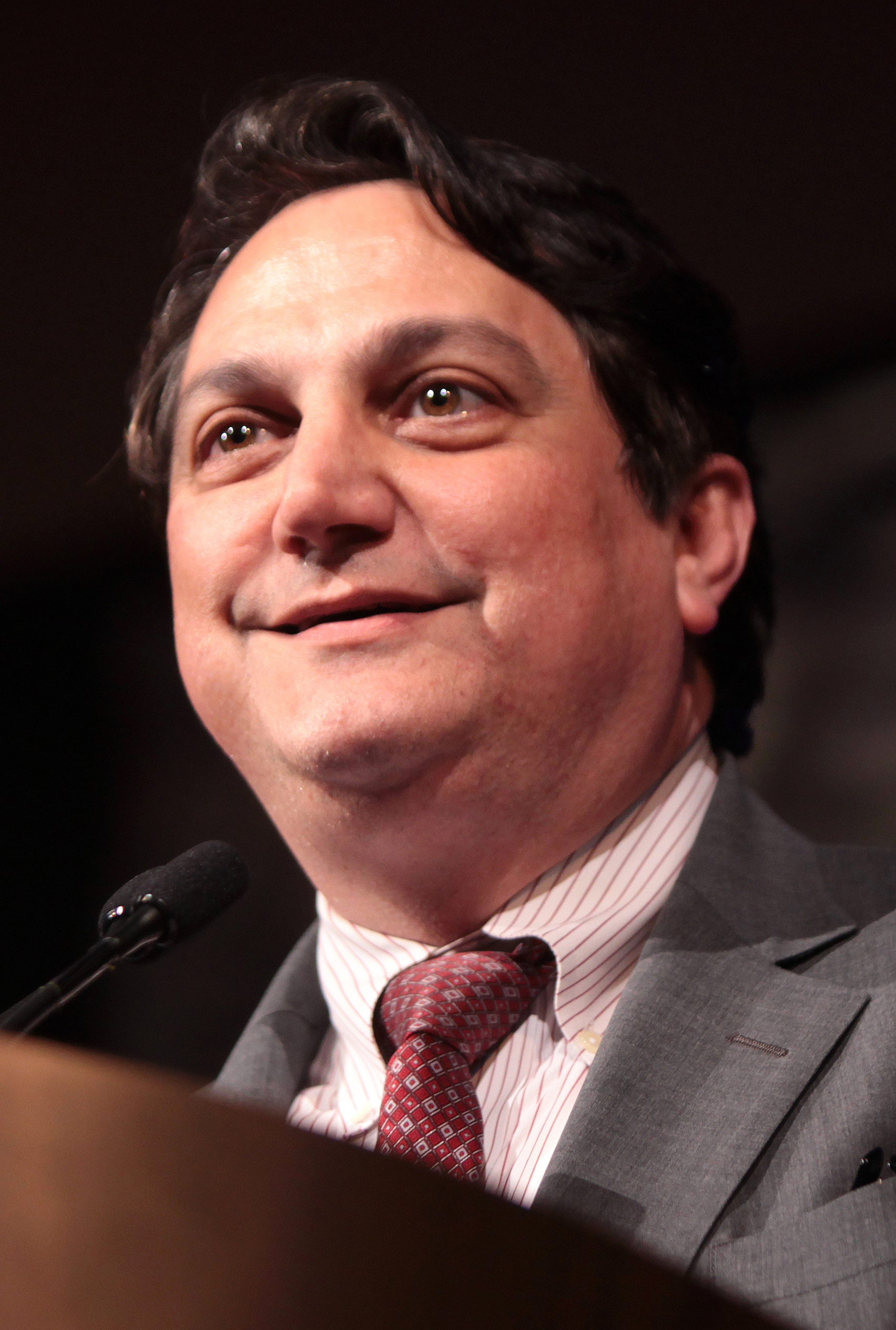
- Munisteri in 2015

Senior Advisor to the Governor of Texas
- Incumbent
- Assumed office December 10, 2020 Serving with Nate Schatzline
- Governor: Greg Abbott
- Preceded by: John Colyandro

Director of the White House Office of Public Liaison
- Acting
- In office December 7, 2018 – February 2, 2019
- President: Donald Trump
- Preceded by: Justin R. Clark
- Succeeded by: Tim Pataki

Chair of the Republican Party of Texas
- In office June 12, 2010 – March 7, 2015
- Preceded by: Cathie Adams
- Succeeded by: Tom Mechler

Personal details
- Born: Stephen Peter Munisteri; December 25, 1957 (age 68)
- Party: Republican
- Spouse: Deanna Armstrong (m. 1983; div. 1988)
- Education: University of Texas, Austin (BA, JD)

Stephen Peter Munisteri (born December 25, 1957) is an American attorney serving as the senior advisor to the Governor of Texas since 2020. A member of the Republican Party, he served as director of the White House Office of Public Liaison from 2017 to 2018, and as chairman of the Republican Party of Texas from 2010 to 2015.

Munisteri was elected chairman at the state convention held in Dallas on June 13, 2010, when he unseated Cathie Adams who had held the position for only eight months. He is the first challenger in modern Texas Republican history to defeat a sitting incumbent for the position of state chairman. Munisteri was the state chairman of the Texas Chapter of Young Americans for Freedom and founded the Young Conservatives of Texas (YCT) in 1980.

Munisteri stepped down as party chairman to join the campaign of Rand Paul, a United States senator from Kentucky as a senior advisor to Paul's 2016 presidential campaign.

== Education and early career ==
Munisteri received a Bachelor of Business Administration from the University of Texas at Austin and a Doctor of Jurisprudence from the University of Texas Law School. He completed both degrees in five years. Munisteri returned to Houston and worked at the law offices of Funderburk and Funderburk (now Funderburk Funderburk Courtois, L.L.P.) for fourteen months before deciding to open his solo law practice, which he continued in partnership with others, for twenty-seven years. Munisteri founded the firm on November 1, 1982, the day before the defeat of Bill Clements as the first Republican governor of Texas since 1873. The firm is now known as Sprott, Rigby, Newson, Robbins & Lunceford, P.C.

In addition to his legal practice, Munisteri was also involved in numerous other businesses in his professional career. He founded Munisteri Properties, a company with interests in commercial properties and whose primary asset was a Greenway Plaza-area building built in 1961 by Gerald D. Hines, which Munisteri redeveloped in 1993. Munisteri sold the Greenway Plaza Area building in 2007. However he still owns an interest in two shopping centers and a commercial building, as well as residential property. He also founded Munisteri Exploration in 1989, and has participated as a partner in the drilling of 60 oil and natural gas wells through 2014. As a side business, Munisteri managed dozens of professional boxers from 1989 to 2009, when he fully retired from the business.

=== Early political involvement ===
Munisteri first worked as a volunteer for the campaigns of Texas Republicans Hank Grover and John Tower in 1972, though the two were bitter intraparty rivals. Munisteri then formed a conservative club at Memorial High School in Houston. In 1976, he was elected state vice chairman for Texas Young Americans for Freedom, was a volunteer for Ronald Reagan and attended the Republican National Convention. Munistieri was the state chairman for YAF from 1977 to 1980 and was also elected to YAF's national board of directors. In 1977, Texas YAF was named the most improved state organization at its 1977 national convention. Under Munisteri's chairmanship, YAF began the practice of issuing legislative rankings for members of the Texas House of Representatives.

In 1980, after experiencing dissatisfaction with the top-down leadership of the national YAF organization at its February 1980 convention, Munisteri proposed a new Texas-based conservative organization to the Texas YAF board. The board voted unanimously to create a new organization named Young Conservatives of Texas. The organization was founded on Texas Independence Day, March 2, 1980, at the Driskill Hotel in Austin, Texas. Munisteri was the first state chairman of the Young Conservatives of Texas.

Munisteri was the state chairman of Young Texans for Reagan in 1980 under Reagan Texas Chair Ernie Angelo. He continued his Republican Party activism as a precinct chairman of precincts 213 and 133 in Harris County in the 1980s, and was also elected to the State Republican Executive Committee for Senate District 17. Munisteri has worked in over 50 campaigns in a volunteer capacity. In 1995, he worked for Lamar Alexander's presidential campaign and helped to put together the Texas volunteer organization under Alexander's state chair Robert Mosbacher Jr. Munistieri also traveled to New Hampshire, Iowa, Florida and South Carolina on behalf of the Alexander presidential campaign in 1996. In 1999, Munisteri spent a month in Iowa to assist the George W. Bush 2000 presidential campaign in the Iowa straw poll, and then spent a month in California running a Bush campaign office in San Fernando. In 2004, Munisteri was part of the Bush legal response team in Ohio during that year's presidential race. In 2008, he traveled to Iowa to assist Texas Land Commissioner Jerry E. Patterson in supporting Fred Thompson's 2008 presidential campaign for president. That same year, Munisteri went to South Carolina to volunteer on behalf of Thompson, and then later spent two months in Iowa assisting the Iowa director for the John McCain 2008 presidential campaign, Charlie Liebschutz.

== Texas GOP chairman ==
=== 2009–2011 ===
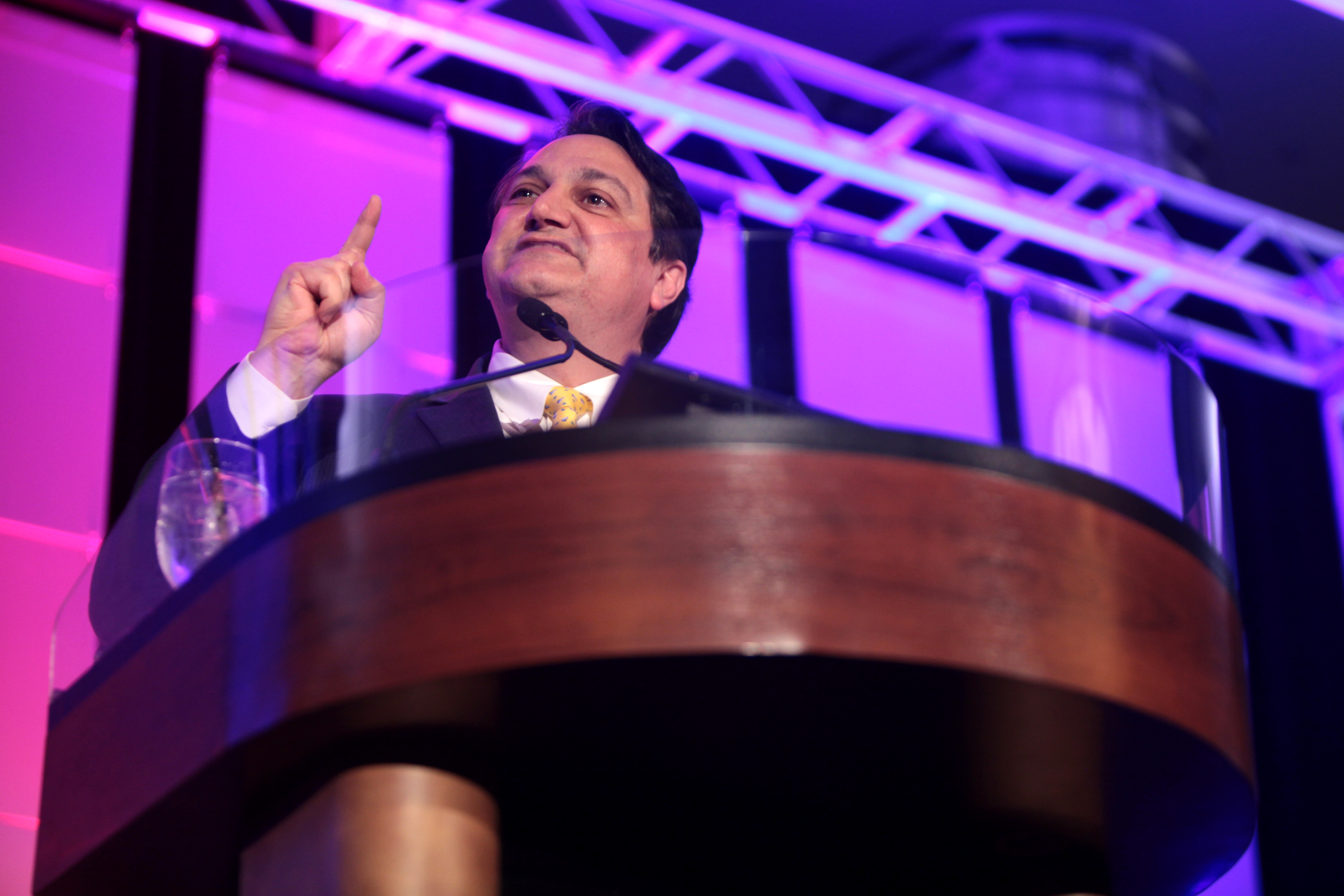
Munisteri speaking to the Tarrant County Republican Party's Lincoln Day Dinner.

In September 2009, the chairwoman of the Republican Party of Texas, Tina Benkiser, announced her resignation at the quarterly State Republican Executive Committee meeting in Austin. Under Texas law, each major party must at all times have a woman as either its chairman or vice-chairman. Since vice-chairman Robin Armstrong did not relinquish his position to seek to succeed Benkiser as state chairman, only a woman could be elected to fill the position. On October 24, 2009, the State Republican Executive Committee elected Texas GOP National Committeewoman Cathie Adams as Benkiser's successor by a vote of 36–25.

On January 22, 2010, Munisteri announced his candidacy for state chairman, citing a desire to make the Republican Party of Texas a "more effective organization" by using his "strong business administrative skills". He was the second declared challenger in the race, as former State Republican Executive Committee member Tom Mechler of Amarillo, had announced his candidacy the previous summer. Munisteri's election marked the first time in modern history that a challenger defeated a sitting incumbent at the state convention in Texas. When Munisteri stepped down early in 2015, Mechler was elected his successor on the third secret ballot by the 62-member Republican State Executive Committee.

On the second day of the convention, delegates voted by senatorial district for the position of State Chairman. Munisteri won 13 districts, Adams won 12 districts, and Mechler won 6 districts. Since no candidate received a majority of districts, a vote was held in the nominations committee of the convention, and Munisteri won the second ballot by a count of 22–9. After the nominations committee presented their results to the full convention, Adams then proceeded to force an unprecedented floor vote for the position, at which point Tom Mechler officially endorsed Munisteri's candidacy. Munisteri then addressed the full convention and declared that his differences with Adams are "insignificant to the duty we have to our country." He placed the reelection of Perry as top priority and then the regaining of Republican majorities in the U.S. House of Representatives and the U.S. Senate. He added, "there's no question we have to get rid of that man in the White House," referencing Barack Obama. In the ensuing floor vote, Munisteri prevailed with a margin of 4,170 to 2,950 for Adams.

Munisteri has issued a monthly "Chairman's Update" email to Texas Republicans with information regarding his activities as chairman. In December 2010, Munisteri announced that the Republican Party of Texas would end 2010 with zero debt, all bills paid, a record net worth, and a record positive cash balance in its accounts.

Under Munisteri's chairmanship in the 2010 general election, the Republican Party of Texas had a net gain of 324 Republican elected offices, obtained a super majority in the Texas House of Representatives, and won all statewide races on the ballot. In December 2011, Munisteri announced that for the first time in a decade, the state party had successfully recruited Republican county chairmen for the 2012 election cycle in all 254 Texas counties. Munisteri was a presidential elector in the 2012 United States presidential election and voted for the Republican nominees, Mitt Romney and Paul Ryan.

=== 2012–2013 ===
Munisteri was reelected as state chairman in June 2012. Out of the over 9,000 delegates registered at the time of the 2012 convention vote, only one voted against him. The party has continued to be debt free since December 2010 and has now adopted a policy to pay down all invoices to $0 by the end of each calendar month. The party has also maintained cash reserves of at least $500,000 since November 2010. During the first three years of Munisteri's chairmanship the party has brought in approximately $13.5 million including approximately $6.7 million in 2012 alone.

The party's improved financial condition allowed the Republican Party of Texas to be a major player in the 2010 and 2012 elections. This included, among other things, organizing three weekends of statewide block walk operations. This resulted in the Republican Party candidates winning 500 more offices in 2010 compared to 2008. Moreover, 75 additional office holders switched parties in 2010 for a net gain of 575 between the 2008 and 2010 election cycles. In 2012, the state party exclusively ran the Victory operations for the first time in years, resulting in the party making 2.6 million calls and sending out over 3 million pieces of mail. The state party spent a total of $2.2 million on its election efforts in 2012.

=== 2014 ===
At the March 2014 meeting of the State Republican Executive Committee, Munisteri announced that he would seek re-election at the request of the successful Republican gubernatorial nominee Greg Abbott. Munisteri also reported at that meeting the party had brought in approximately $17 million in revenues during his tenure as chairman. He indicated that the party was in excellent financial health and has been completely debt free since November 2010. He also indicated that cash reserves had never fallen below $500,000 during that time. Munisteri also reported at that meeting that the outreach and Victory efforts continued to be expanded to include 10 full-time engagement and field staffers, include a full-time director of youth engagement, director of African American engagement, director of Hispanic engagement, and a full-time director of Asian American engagement.

At the 2014 State Convention, Munisteri was re-elected as chairman with only four votes against him out of approximately 7,000 delegates and alternates in attendance.

The Republican Party of Texas also announced in November that under Munisteri's chairmanship, the party had brought in approximately $22 million and had been completely debt-free for four consecutive years.

=== 2015–present ===
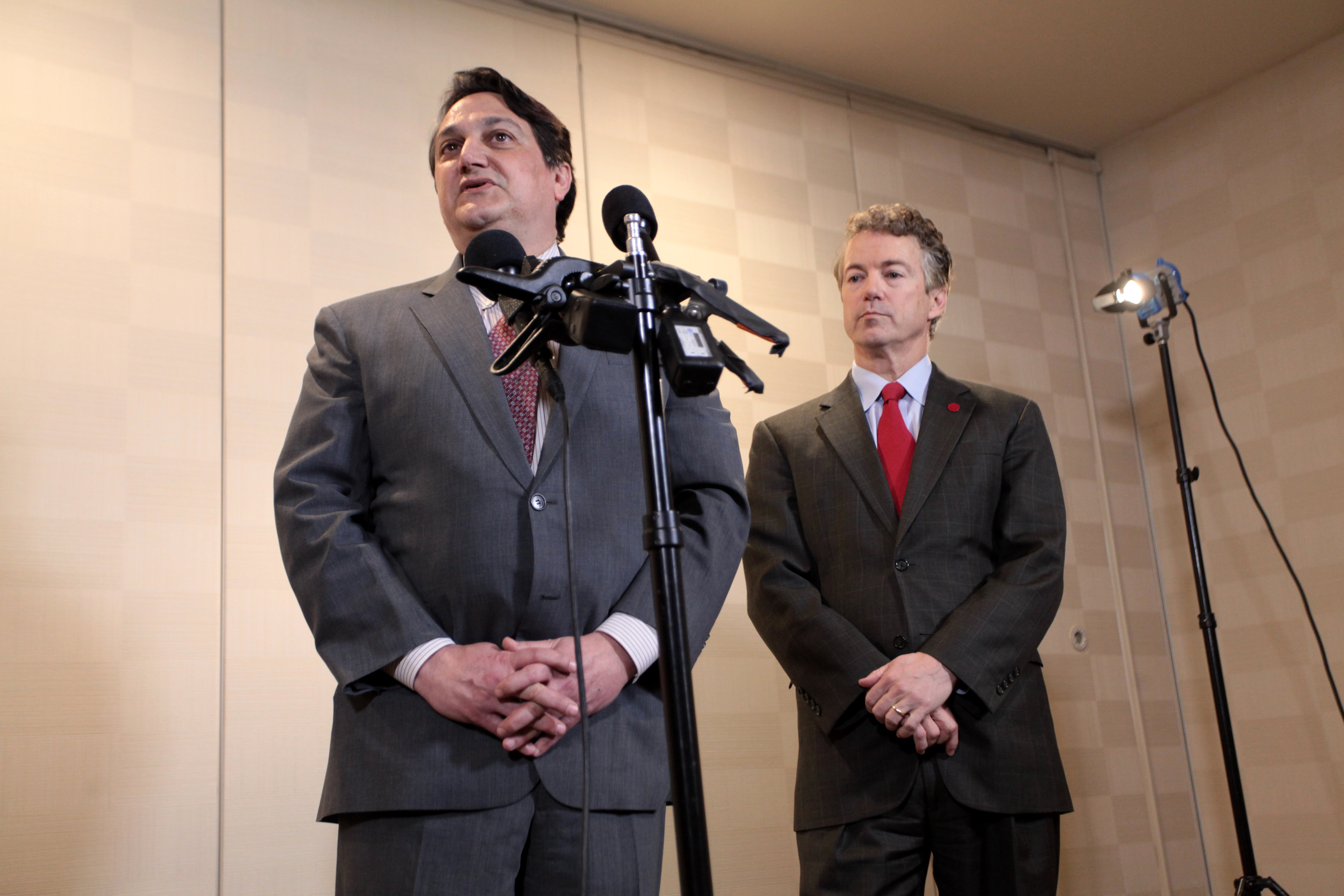
Munisteri at a press conference with Senator Rand Paul in Dallas, Texas.

In 2015, Munisteri announced he would be joining Rand Paul's team of senior advisors. His resignation was effective March 7, 2015. In an official statement explaining his reasoning behind the decision Munisteri writes:

Today I informed the SREC that I will be stepping down on March 7th. I have done so, in part, in order to accept the position of Senior Advisor to Senator Rand Paul of Kentucky. Senator Paul shares my vision of promoting the conservative values of individual freedom, limited government, a strong national defense, and defense of the Constitution in each and every community in our country.

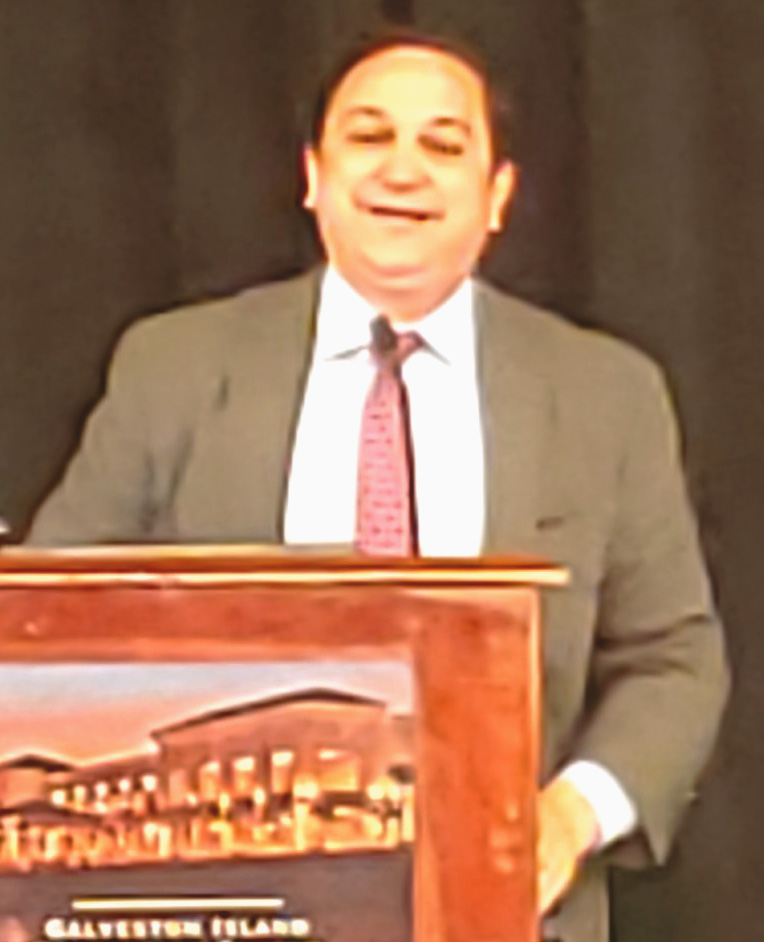
Steve Munisteri in Galveston, Texas on September 7, 2019.

Munisteri said he's supporting Paul, in part because of the Kentucky Republican's strategy to court nontraditional GOP voters, like African-Americans and young people.

Munisteri was an at-large delegate to the 2016 Republican National Convention from Texas. Munisteri was one of 48 delegates from Texas bound by state party rules to support Donald Trump at the convention. As of July 13, 2016, Trump had approximately 1,542 delegates. The winner of the Republican nomination needed the support of 1,237 delegates. Trump formally won the nomination on July 19, 2016, and the presidential election of 2016.

Beginning in 2017, Munisteri served as deputy assistant to the president and deputy director for the White House Office of Public Liaison in Trump administration. He left the Trump administration in 2019 to help run the 2020 re-election campaign of United States senator John Cornyn.

In December 2020, Munisteri joined the office of Governor Greg Abbott as senior adviser and policy director.

Party political offices
Preceded by Cathie Adams	Chair of the Texas Republican Party; 2010–2015	Succeeded by Tom Mechler
Political offices
Preceded by Justin R. Clark	Director of the Office of Public Liaison; Acting; 2018–2019	Succeeded by Timothy Pataki
