= Tom Pauken =

American politician (born 1944)

Member of the Texas Workforce Commission for Employers
- In office March 1, 2008 – March 1, 2013
- Governor: Rick Perry
- Preceded by: Ron Lehman
- Succeeded by: Esperanza Andrade

Chair of the Texas Workforce Commission
- In office March 1, 2008 – May 1, 2012
- Governor: Rick Perry
- Preceded by: Diane Rath
- Succeeded by: Andres Alcantar

Chairman of the Republican Party of Texas
- In office 1994–1997
- Preceded by: Fred Meyer
- Succeeded by: Susan Weddington

Personal details
- Born: Thomas Weir Pauken; January 11, 1944 (age 82) Victoria, Texas, U.S.
- Party: Republican (1965–present)
- Spouse: Ida Ayala
- Children: 7
- Education: Georgetown University; Southern Methodist University
- Website: Official website

Military service
- Allegiance: United States of America
- Branch/service: United States Army
- Years of service: 1967–1970
- Battles/wars: Vietnam War

Thomas Weir Pauken (born January 11, 1944) is an American politician and member of the Republican Party.

Pauken is a former member and chairman of the Texas Workforce Commission. A former long-term resident of Dallas, who now resides in the resort community of Port Aransas in Nueces County on the Texas Gulf Coast, Pauken is a businessman, lawyer, and the author of two books. He served as chairman of the Texas Republican Party from 1994 to 1997 during the transition period when the party leaped quickly from minority to majority status at the statewide level. A staunch conservative, Pauken also served on President Ronald W. Reagan's White House staff.

On August 21, 2006, Governor Rick Perry named Pauken to chairman the Texas Task Force on Appraisal Reform (TFAR) to study and make recommendations on how to address Texans' continuing concerns over property appraisals. In March 2008, Perry appointed Pauken chairman of the Texas Workforce Commission (TWC), which administers state unemployment compensation benefits, provides workforce development services, and maintains and issues state labor market data.

During his time as TWC chairman, which ended in May 2012, Pauken oversaw the development of the Texas Back to Work program and the Texas Veterans Leadership Program (TVLP).

He was a candidate for governor in 2014 but withdrew early in the contest and supported Greg Abbott, the state attorney general and the party nominee in the November 4 general election.

== Education and personal life ==
Pauken was born on January 11, 1944, in Victoria, Texas. A graduate of the Jesuit High School in Dallas, Pauken attended Georgetown University in Washington, D.C., from which he received his Bachelor of Arts in political science in 1965. From 1967 to 1970, he served in the United States Army, with a tour of duty in Vietnam. He obtained his Juris Doctor degree from Southern Methodist University in Dallas in 1973.

== Georgetown University, College Republicans, Vietnam ==
Pauken entered Georgetown University in 1961 and became involved in politics as a "foot soldier in a small but growing conservative army" that was known for their support of the U.S. Senator Barry M. Goldwater.

Pauken was elected national chairman of College Republicans and served from 1965 to 1967. The issue of the Vietnam War dominated his time as chairman; Pauken organized the bipartisan National Student Committee for the Defense of Vietnam. The group collected more than half a million signatures from students across the nation for a petition expressing support for American soldiers in Vietnam that was presented to Vice President Hubert H. Humphrey.

Upon completion of his term as the chairman of College Republicans, Pauken enlisted in the Army, because "I knew . . . I would be nothing but a hypocrite if I ducked my own obligation to serve." Pauken served as a military intelligence officer in Vietnam and returned to America at the end of December, 1969

== Reagan White House ==
Pauken was asked to serve on President Reagan's transition team after the 1980 election. On February 3, 1981, Pauken was nominated by Reagan to serve as director of the ACTION agency, now known as AmeriCorps. Under Pauken's leadership, the staff at ACTION was reduced from 1,000 to 500 and the budget was reduced 25%, from $160 million to $120 million. Pauken also ended ACTION's funding of liberal organizations, many of whom had ties to Saul Alinsky.

During his tenure at ACTION, Pauken established the Vietnam Veterans Leadership Program" an organization "created for Vietnam Veterans and led by Vietnam Veterans who were committed to helping our fellow veterans who were unemployed, underemployed, or who had lingering problems associated with their Vietnam experience."

At ACTION, Pauken oversaw the implementation of the Just Say No to Drugs program in which Nancy Reagan served as chief spokeswoman. He was awarded the Ronald Reagan Medal of Honor by Reagan administration alumni.

In 1985, Pauken left the Reagan administration to return to Texas to enter private business. He joined a Dallas-based venture capital company in 1986.

== Chairmanship of the Texas GOP ==
In 1994, Pauken was elected chairman of his state party organization with strong support from Reagan conservatives and social conservatives disenchanted with the so-called "stand-patism" and moderation of the outgoing chairman, Fred Meyer, an ally of former president George H. W. Bush. Pauken won the chairmanship by defeating a last-minute challenge waged by still serving U.S. Representative Joe Barton of Ennis, whose district at the time stretched from the Dallas southern suburbs to Bryan-College Station.

During Pauken's tenure as chairman, the Republican Party gained majority status in Texas, and he was re-elected chairman in 1996. He chaired the Texas delegation to the Republican National Convention in 1996.

The party continued to experience divisions between its establishment faction and its conservative wing. In 1996, Bill Price, a social conservative who had opposed Pauken when he ran for state chairman in 1994, led an effort to deny the naming of U.S. Senator Kay Bailey Hutchison as a delegate to the Republican National Convention in San Diego, California, on the grounds that Hutchison is not pro-life. Pauken supported the selection of Hutchison as a delegate to the national convention, and she was elected a delegate at the state convention. The issue became divisive at the state convention even though Senator Robert Dole already had secured enough delegates to win the Republican nomination for president.

== Chairmanship of Texas Workforce Commission ==
Pauken served as chairman of Texas Workforce Commission from March 2008 through April 2012. Upon the completion of his tenure as chairman, Pauken remained at TWC as the commissioner representing employers. During his tenure he established the Texas Veterans Leadership Program (TVLP). TVLP is led and staffed by veterans of the wars of Iraq and Afghanistan and provides outreach to returning veterans from those wars aimed at helping the veterans to find employment. As of March 2012, about eight thousand returning veterans have received assistance from the program.

Pauken also initiated the creation of the Texas Back to Work program, which offers an incentive of up to $2,000 to employers for hiring qualified out-of-work Texans who lost their job through no fault of their own. More than 25,000 workers have obtained jobs through the program, which received the Unemployment Insurance Innovation Award for Reemployment in October 2010.

From the start of his tenure as chairman, Pauken has been a vocal advocate of the need to rebuild the American manufacturing industry and to place greater emphasis on the skilled trades, especially at the secondary school level.

Pauken announced his retirement from TWC effective March 1, 2013.

== Political campaigns ==
In 1978, Pauken challenged the freshman Democratic Representative Jim Mattox of Dallas for Texas's 5th congressional district seat in the United States House of Representatives, a position held by earlier Republicans Bruce Reynolds Alger and Alan Steelman. Mattox was assisted in his campaign by visits from President Jimmy Carter and First Lady Rosalyn Smith Carter. Pauken offered a conservative alternative in sharp contrast to Mattox. The Democrat prevailed, with 35,524 votes (50 percent) to Pauken's 34,672 (49 percent). In their rematch in 1980, Pauken lost by 3,044 votes: 70,892 (51 percent) to 67,848 (49 percent). While Ronald Reagan was a winner in the Fifth District, he had no presidential coattails sufficient to lift Pauken to victory.

After the congressional losses, Pauken joined the transition team of President-elect Reagan. After his tenure at ACTION and his return to Texas, Reagan called upon Pauken again on April 22, 1987, to become a director of the Inter-American Foundation.

Pauken ran again for the U.S. House in a special election after Steve Bartlett resigned to run for mayor of Dallas. Sam Johnson defeated Pauken, with 24,004 votes (52.6 percent) to 21,647 (47.4 percent).

In 1998 Pauken lost his bid in the Republican primary for the Attorney General of Texas.

In 2010, Pauken endorsed Perry for renomination in his successful race against Senator Hutchison and for reelection in the fall campaign against the Democrat Bill White, a former mayor of Houston, Texas. However, Pauken remained neutral in Perry's unsuccessful bid for the 2012 Republican presidential nomination.

== As book author ==
Pauken is the author of two books, The Thirty Years War: The Politics of the Sixties Generation and Bringing American Home: How America Lost Her Way and How We Can Find Our Way Back.

Published in 1995, The Thirty Years War is a memoir in which Pauken explains his involvement in politics beginning in the 1960s. The book traces Pauken's early interest in politics as a debater at Jesuit High School in Dallas; his time at Georgetown in which he was embroiled in the campus conflicts over the Vietnam War; his service in Vietnam and frustration with the execution of the war; his work for and ultimate disillusionment with the Richard M. Nixon White House, and his time in Reagan administration when he was director of ACTION. The noted conservative reporter and commentator Robert Novak, wrote in a foreword to the book, that The Thirty Years War demonstrates how "Pauken believes in what he says, and performs accordingly..." Novak concluded by writing that "Tom Pauken cherishes and nourishes the dangerous idea that the Republican Party should stand for something. He gives every indication that after fighting for 30 years, he is just getting his second wind."

In Bringing America Home (2010), Pauken outlines what he believes to be the causes of America's economic downturn, misguided foreign policy, and moral decline. Like the columnist and former presidential candidate Patrick J. Buchanan, Pauken places much of the blame on neoconservatives within the Republican Party leadership. He outlines a plan for addressing the nation's ills rooted in the Founding Fathers and traditional conservative principles. Booklist described the book as a "conservative manifesto of the highest caliber—humane, civilized, expressed by an active, living conscience." Bringing America Home argues that the George W. Bush presidential administration squandered the conservative political capital of the Goldwater-Reagan years.

== As political commentator ==
Pauken is a frequent political commentator on Texas radio stations and television programs in addition to regular speeches to civic clubs and conventions. He is also a guest opinion column contributor to several Texas newspapers and blogs. Pauken is a regular contributor to Chronicles, a paleoconservative magazine published by the Rockford Institute in Rockford, Illinois.

== On property taxation ==
On April 26, 2006, Pauken endorsed the Texas Tax Reform Commission's plan for property tax relief and business tax reform. A portion of his statement follows:

"Those who know me know that I have never been shy about encouraging elected leaders to adhere to the Republican Party's conservative philosophy when dealing with the issue of taxes. As former chairman of the Republican Party of Texas, a former member of the Reagan administration and a conservative, grassroots activist for more than four decades, I have been unequivocal in my support for conservative tax reform, even if the byproduct is a few ruffled feathers. There is no doubt that, if this plan flouted conservative principles, I would be among the first to publicly call for its defeat. Instead, I am urging lawmakers to adopt this plan as soon as possible because it would be a tremendous victory for Texas homeowners and taxpayers. At the same time, this legislation encourages job creation and economic growth, particularly in the manufacturing sector."

The proposal was adopted near the close of the special session of the Texas Legislature, which met a June 1, 2006, deadline, set by the Texas Supreme Court in regard to school funding.

== On education reform ==
In mid-2012, Pauken emerged as a leading opponent of Texas' current model of mandatory testing and college preparation. Pauken contended a system of "test learning" de-emphasizes a more wholistic educational approach and leads to a higher number of dropouts. He proposed a multi-pathway system by which high school students can learn career-centric math and science skills, while earning certifications and licenses in their preferred fields. Each pathway would lead to the same diploma, and college preparation would still be an emphasis for students who wish to pursue higher education. Several of these reforms appeared in the Pauken-supported Texas House Bill 5, which became law in June 2013.

Pauken said in an op-ed appearing in the Texas Tribune: "For those on the career path, certification or licensure in their fields is the best way to show whether or not their education was successful. And for those going to a university, there is no reason we can't use the same tests that universities use in determining admission, like the SAT or ACT. Performance measures ought to be tied to the actual outcomes that we seek for our students."

== 2014 gubernatorial campaign ==
Pauken announced his gubernatorial candidacy on March 21, 2013. His decision to seek the governorship, he indicated, is not predicated on what other candidates may also enter the field, meaning Governor Perry, a potential candidate for reelection to a fourth full term, and Attorney General Greg Abbott, now in his third term in that position. Pauken said that he wants to end "crony capitalism" and repair long-term problems of public education.

"We just need a different style of leadership and a different approach to addressing the issues," Pauken said. He vowed to run a common-sense issues campaign, not one based on "consultant-driven sound bites".

He withdrew from the race on December 5, 2013, citing his "financial and organizational" difficulties and the lack of a "realistic path to victory".

Pauken supports term limits for state officials. and opposes the "Robin Hood" transfer of money from property-rich school districts to those with fewer resources. He claims that the state should make up the difference in funding between the wealthier and the poorer districts in a "revenue-neutral" fashion by replacing a portion of property taxes with consumption taxes or by expanding the sales tax. He supports expanded vocational education, greater local control of schools, and reduced emphasis on standardized testing.

Pauken said that when he ran for state GOP chairman in 1994, "We didn't have much money and we had (political operative) Karl Rove against me and (U.S. Senator) Phil Gramm—the entire establishment—against us. And we won."

In 1998, the last time that Pauken sought elected office, he finished with 30 percent in a three-candidate field for the office of Texas attorney general. The winner of the primary runoff election was John Cornyn, the state's current senior U.S. senator and a candidate for reelection to a third term in 2014. Coincidentally, the Democrat that Cornyn defeated in the general election held on November 3, 1998, was former Attorney General Jim Mattox, the same candidate who had defeated Pauken for the Dallas-based congressional seat in 1978 and 1980.

== See also ==
- List of Chairpersons of the College Republicans
- Texas Workforce Commission
- ACTION agency

Party political offices
Preceded by Fred Meyer	Chairman of the Republican Party of Texas; 1994–1997	Succeeded by Susan Weddington
