= Esperanza Andrade =

American politician (born 1949)

Esperanza "Hope" Andrade

Secretary of State of Texas
- In office July 2008 – November 23, 2012
- Governor: Rick Perry
- Preceded by: Phil Wilson
- Succeeded by: John Steen

Texas Workforce Commissioner
- In office March 2013 – June 2015
- Preceded by: Ruth Hughs
- Succeeded by: Tom Pauken

Personal details
- Born: July 1, 1949 (age 77)
- Party: Republican
- Occupation: Businesswoman

Esperanza "Hope" Andrade (born July 1, 1949) is a businesswoman from San Antonio, Texas. She is the former commissioner representing employers on the Texas Workforce Commission, an appointed position which she held from 2013 to 2015. From 2008 to 2012, she served as the secretary of state of Texas under Governor Rick Perry.

== Texas Workforce Commissioner ==
Andrade has worked as an entrepreneur and has been involved in business and community organizations in San Antonio for more than three decades. She was confirmed by the Texas Senate as the workforce commissioner in March 2013, succeeding Tom Pauken, a fellow Republican. She served in this position until June 2015.

== Texas Secretary of State ==
Andrade was appointed secretary of state by Governor Perry in 2008. As secretary of state, she was the state's chief elections officer, chief international protocol officer, and border commerce coordinator for the governor's office.

As the elections officer, she toured the state encouraging registration and high voter turnout. She supported the removal of nearly seventy thousand names from the voter rolls of individuals believed to be deceased, based largely on Social Security death records. However, some of the deleted names were of the living, and four individuals sued the state for having been wrongfully stricken from the rolls. Andrade also encountered controversy when, before the November 6, 2012, general election, she objected to the use of international observers examining Texas voting procedures.

She vacated the secretary of state's office on November 23, 2012, after nearly four-and-a-half years on the job. She was the sixth and longest-serving Texas Secretary of State and the second of three women in the post under Perry. Andrade is the first Hispanic woman to have served as the Texas Secretary of State and the third Hispanic person overall, following Roy Barrera Sr. and Henry Cuellar, who is currently serving as the U.S. representative for Texas's 28th congressional district.

On November 27, 2012, Perry appointed John Thomas Steen, Jr., also of San Antonio, to succeed Andrade as secretary of state. He is an attorney who previously served on the Texas Public Safety Commission and the Texas Alcoholic Beverage Commission. Steen contributed $56,000 to Perry's past gubernatorial campaigns.

== Texas Transportation Commissioner ==
Before she was appointed as Secretary of State, Andrade was appointed by Governor Perry to the Texas Transportation Commission. She became interim chair of the transportation commission in January 2008, upon the death of its previous chair, Ric Williamson, a former member of the Texas House of Representatives; she left the commission in May 2008. Shortly thereafter, in July 2008, Perry named her Secretary of State when Samuel P. "Phil" Wilson resigned after serving one year in the position.

== Contract for River Walk barges ==
On May 25, 2017, Andrade and Lisa Wong, her business partner in their company, Go Rio San Antonio, prevailed in a 10–1 vote from the San Antonio City Council for the $100 million contract to operate the barges on the San Antonio River Walk. The only dissenter on the council was the mayoral candidate Ron Nirenberg, who unseated Mayor Ivy Taylor in a runoff election on June 10. In selecting Andrade and Wong, the council rejected City Manager Sheryl Sculley's recommendation to award the contract instead to the Chicago-based Entertainment Cruises, the choice also of former Mayor Phil Hardberger. On receiving the contract, Andrade told Taylor and the council: "We not only know, but we understand why the River Walk is indeed our crown jewel of our beautiful city. And we understand that the barge operation is the thread that weaves it all together."

== Business Ventures ==
Andrade has participated in various business ventures in San Antonio and the state of Texas.

Her Biography notes her involvement in ownership of frostbank, the San Antonio missions baseball franchise, along with her involvement in Andrade-Van-de-Putte & Associates consulting.

Additionally, In 2024, The City of Galveston in partnership with the City of Houston and the Texas Department of Transportation honored her by dedicating a ferry to her name in Galveston Bay.

Andrade has held roles in both business and government in Texas.

== President and CEO of Alamo Trust ==
Andrade was appointed to be President and CEO of the Alamo Trust on October 24, 2025.

== Personal life ==
Esperanza Andrade has a son, Michael, and three grandsons.

Political offices
Preceded by Phil Wilson	Secretary of State of Texas; 2008–2012	Succeeded by John Steen
