= Republican Party of Texas =

Texas affiliate of the Republican Party

- Chairperson: D'Rinda Randall
- Governor of Texas: Greg Abbott
- Lieutenant Governor of Texas: Dan Patrick
- Speaker of the Texas House of Representatives: Dustin Burrows
- Founded: 1867
- Headquarters: PO Box 2206, Austin, Texas 78768
- Membership (October 3, 2026): ▼6,586,795
- Ideology: Ultraconservatism; Christian right
- Political position: Right-wing to far-right
- National affiliation: Republican Party
- Colors: Red
- Texas House of Representatives: 88 / 150
- Texas Senate: 18 / 31
- Statewide Executive Offices: 9 / 9
- Board of Education: 11 / 15
- United States House of Representatives: 25 / 38
- United States Senate: 2 / 2
- Supreme Court of Texas: 9 / 9

Election symbol

Website
- www.texasgop.org

The Republican Party of Texas (RPT) is the Texas affiliate of the Republican Party in the United States. It is currently chaired by D'Rinda Randall, who succeeded Abraham George in 2026. The party is headquartered in Austin, Texas, and is legally considered a political action committee under Texas law.

From 1998 to 2026, it was the state's ruling party, controlling all statewide elected offices, both houses of the legislature, and the majority of congressional seats. However, the party suffered a battery of losses as part of that year's midterm election, losing all statewide offices up for election, the Texas House of Reprensentatives, and a US senate seat to the Democrats.

== History ==
600 delegates attended the first Texas Republican convention in 1867, comprised majorly of black voters.

The party expanded rapidly during the Reconstruction era, after constitutional amendments abolished slavery and granted suffrage to black men. Many African Americans, including educated men of mixed race who had been free before the American Civil War, joined the party that had fought for abolition. Republican leadership advocated for public education, labor rights, and opportunities for freedmen. Notable early black leaders in the Texas GOP included William Madison McDonald of Fort Worth, Norris Wright Cuney of Galveston, and Henry Clay Ferguson.

In 1870, Edmund J. Davis was elected Governor of Texas as a Republican, but he lost reelection in 1874. Although Republicans garnered nearly one-third of the statewide vote in 1876 and gained a few legislative seats, including several held by African Americans, these advances were soon reversed. Democrats regained control and instituted measures like poll taxes and white primaries that disenfranchised black voters and marginalized the Republican Party for decades.

After the end of Reconstruction, internal divisions developed within the Texas GOP. By the early 20th century, the "Lily White" faction had pushed most African Americans out of party leadership. Laws requiring poll taxes further reduced black voter participation—from more than 100,000 in the 1890s to just 5,000 by 1906. Mexican Americans and poor whites were also affected by these policies.

Despite statewide setbacks, some German American communities in the Texas Hill Country—including Gillespie, Guadalupe, and Kendall counties—remained Republican strongholds due to their Unionist and anti-slavery leanings.

From 1901 to 1954, Harry M. Wurzbach, a German Texan from the Hill Country, was the only Republican to serve in Congress from Texas. His repeated elections were notable in an otherwise one-party Democratic state.

The party held its first statewide primary in 1926, drawing only 15,239 voters. By contrast, the Democratic primary that year drew more than 800,000 voters. Only two more Republican primaries occurred over the next three decades.

=== 1960–present ===
In 1961, James A. Leonard became the first executive director of the Texas Republican Party. He was partly responsible for John Tower's successful campaign for the U.S. Senate, which filled the seat vacated by Lyndon B. Johnson. Tower's 1961 win was the first major Republican victory in Texas since Reconstruction.

In 1966, two Texas Republicans were elected to the U.S. House: George H. W. Bush and Bob Price. That year also saw Republicans elected to both the Texas House and Senate. By 1972, Republicans had expanded their legislative representation to 17 members in the House and 3 in the Senate.

A turning point came in the 1976 presidential primary, when Ronald Reagan defeated sitting President Gerald Ford in Texas by a two-to-one margin. According to James Baker, Reagan’s campaign "changed the whole shape and nature of the state." Reagan energized suburban conservatives, business owners, and evangelical Christians, reshaping the party’s ideological base.

In 1978, Bill Clements narrowly won the governorship, becoming the first Republican to hold that office in Texas since Reconstruction. Reagan’s 1984 reelection campaign—coordinated with then-Vice President George H. W. Bush and Senate candidate Phil Gramm—further boosted the GOP’s infrastructure and outreach in Texas.

Since 1994, Republicans have held every statewide elected office in Texas. The party’s dominance extends to both chambers of the legislature, as well as the judiciary and executive offices. The last time a Democratic presidential candidate carried Texas was Jimmy Carter in 1976.

President George H. W. Bush (1989–1993)

President George W. Bush (2001–2009)

Two U.S. presidents, George H. W. Bush (41st) and his son George W. Bush (43rd), were residents of Texas.

In 2020, the Texas GOP adopted the slogan "We are the storm," a phrase also popular among followers of the QAnon conspiracy theory. Then-chair Allen West attributed the slogan to a poem of uncertain origin.

In 2022, the party’s platform opposed LGBT rights, labeled homosexuality as "an abnormal lifestyle choice," and rejected efforts to validate transgender identities. That year, Rep. Tony Gonzales was the only Texas Republican to vote in favor of codifying same-sex marriage rights.

The party continues to support strict abortion bans, rejecting exceptions for rape, incest, or life-threatening conditions.

In 2024, the Texas GOP voted to restrict primary election access for censured candidates, although state law requires open primaries.

In 2026, the party was ousted from power in that year's elections in the state by the rival Democrats, who won the governorship, a US Senate seat, the lower house of the state legislature, and several other statewide offices, ending the Republican Party's 28 year dominance in Texas politics.

== Organization ==
Like many U.S. political parties, the Republican Party of Texas is governed by a biennial state convention that serves as the ultimate authority of the party.

The state convention establishes party rules, adopts the party platform, and elects statewide party officers. In presidential election years, the convention also selects delegates to the Republican National Convention.

Conventions occur at the precinct, county or senatorial district, and state levels. Each level elects delegates to the next.

=== Precinct conventions ===
Held immediately after the Republican primary election, precinct conventions are open to anyone who voted in the Republican primary or signs an oath of affiliation. Delegates adopt resolutions for the party platform and elect delegates to the county or senatorial district conventions.

=== County and senatorial district conventions ===
Each county holds either a countywide convention or, if the county overlaps with multiple state senate districts, separate senatorial district conventions. In 2024, Harris County held nine separate conventions for its nine senatorial districts.

These conventions elect delegates to the state convention and consider platform and rules resolutions.

=== State convention ===
The biennial state convention is the final authority for the party. It adopts the platform and rules, elects statewide party officials, and selects members of the State Republican Executive Committee. In presidential years, it also selects delegates to the Republican National Convention.

No level of the Texas Republican Party conducts nominating conventions for candidates. All party nominations for public office are made through primary elections in accordance with Texas law.

== 2022 convention and reaction ==
In June 2022, the Republican Party of Texas held its biennial state convention in Houston, drawing over 5,000 delegates and alternates. The convention generated national attention for adopting a number of controversial resolutions and platform changes.

The party barred the Log Cabin Republicans, a group that advocates for LGBT rights within the GOP, from having a booth at the event. Delegates approved a platform change stating that homosexuality is "an abnormal lifestyle choice" and opposed any recognition of transgender identity.

The convention also included multiple screenings of 2000 Mules, a film by Dinesh D'Souza which falsely alleged widespread election fraud in the 2020 U.S. presidential election. Delegates approved a resolution declaring that President Joe Biden "was not legitimately elected".

Additional planks in the adopted platform included:

- A call to repeal the Voting Rights Act of 1965;
- A proposal for a state-level Electoral College, in which Texas Senate districts would elect electors to vote for statewide officials;
- A call for public schools to stop teaching "sexual matters" including gender identity and sex education, while promoting the "dignity of the preborn human";
- Support for the right of Texas to secede from the United States, with a proposal for a future referendum on the matter.

The convention also censured longtime U.S. Senator John Cornyn for participating in bipartisan talks on gun legislation in the wake of recent mass shootings.

The adopted platform was praised by former President Donald Trump, who said it reflected "courage" and the will of Republican voters.

Media coverage of the platform characterized it as far-right and exclusionary. The New York Times described it as "far-right" and noted its embrace of election denialism.

The Houston Chronicle emphasized that the platform serves as a "mission statement" and is not legally binding.

Critics within the GOP, including Donald Trump Jr., expressed concern over excluding the Log Cabin Republicans, framing it as contradictory to inclusive conservative values.

== Current elected officials ==
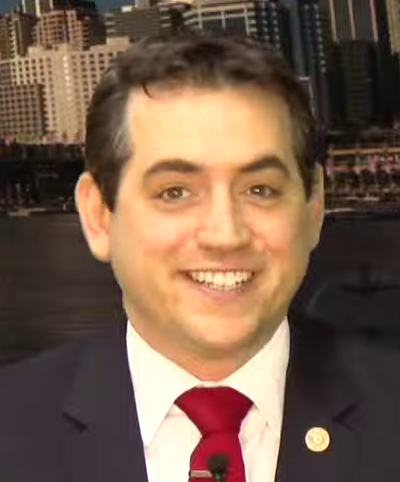
Former Party Chairman Matt Rinaldi

Texas Republicans currently control all statewide elected offices, a majority in both chambers of the Texas Legislature, both U.S. Senate seats, and a majority of U.S. House seats from Texas.

=== Members of Congress ===
==== U.S. Senate ====
Republicans have held both Texas seats in the U.S. Senate since 1993:

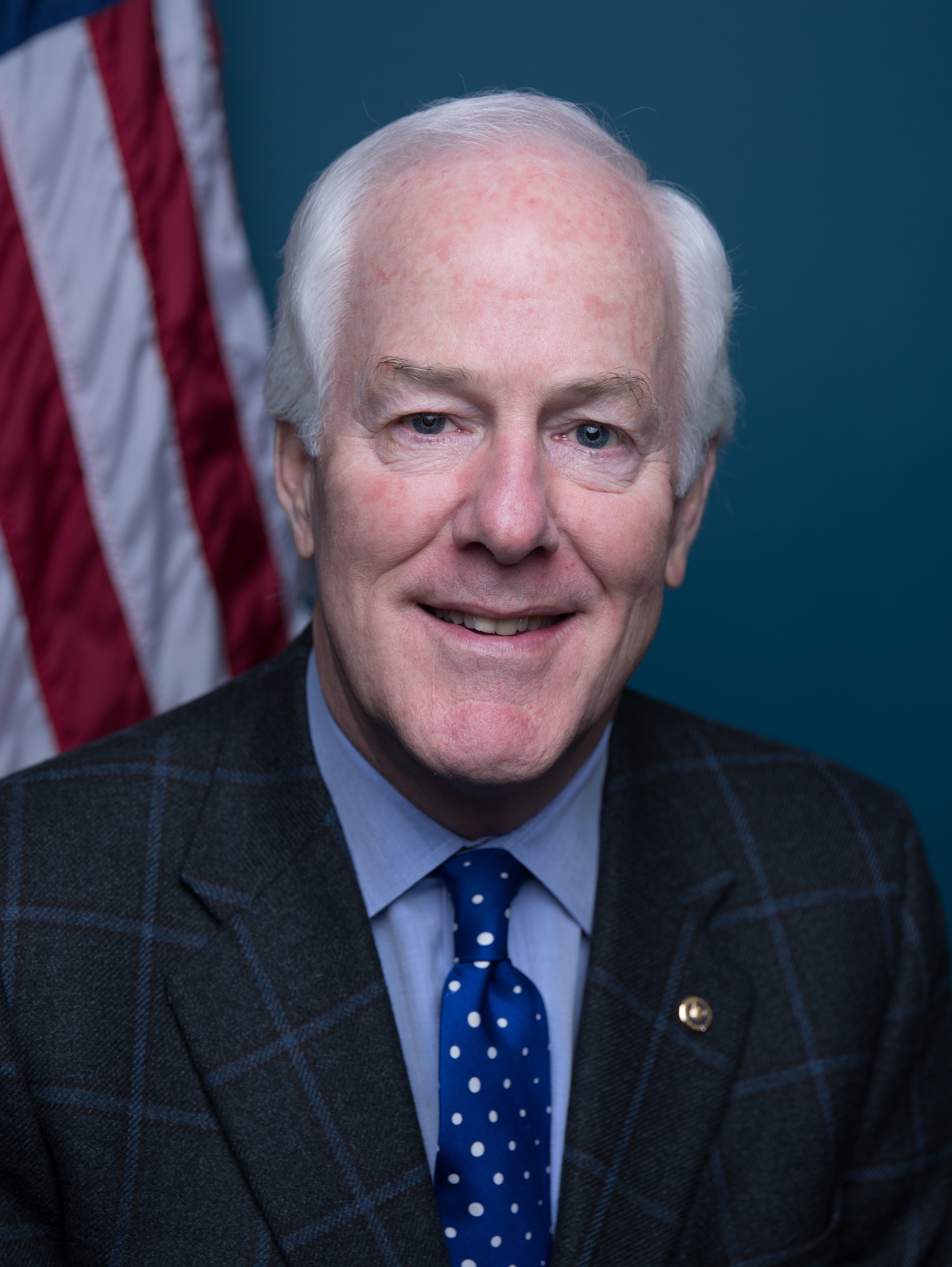
Senior U.S. Senator John Cornyn

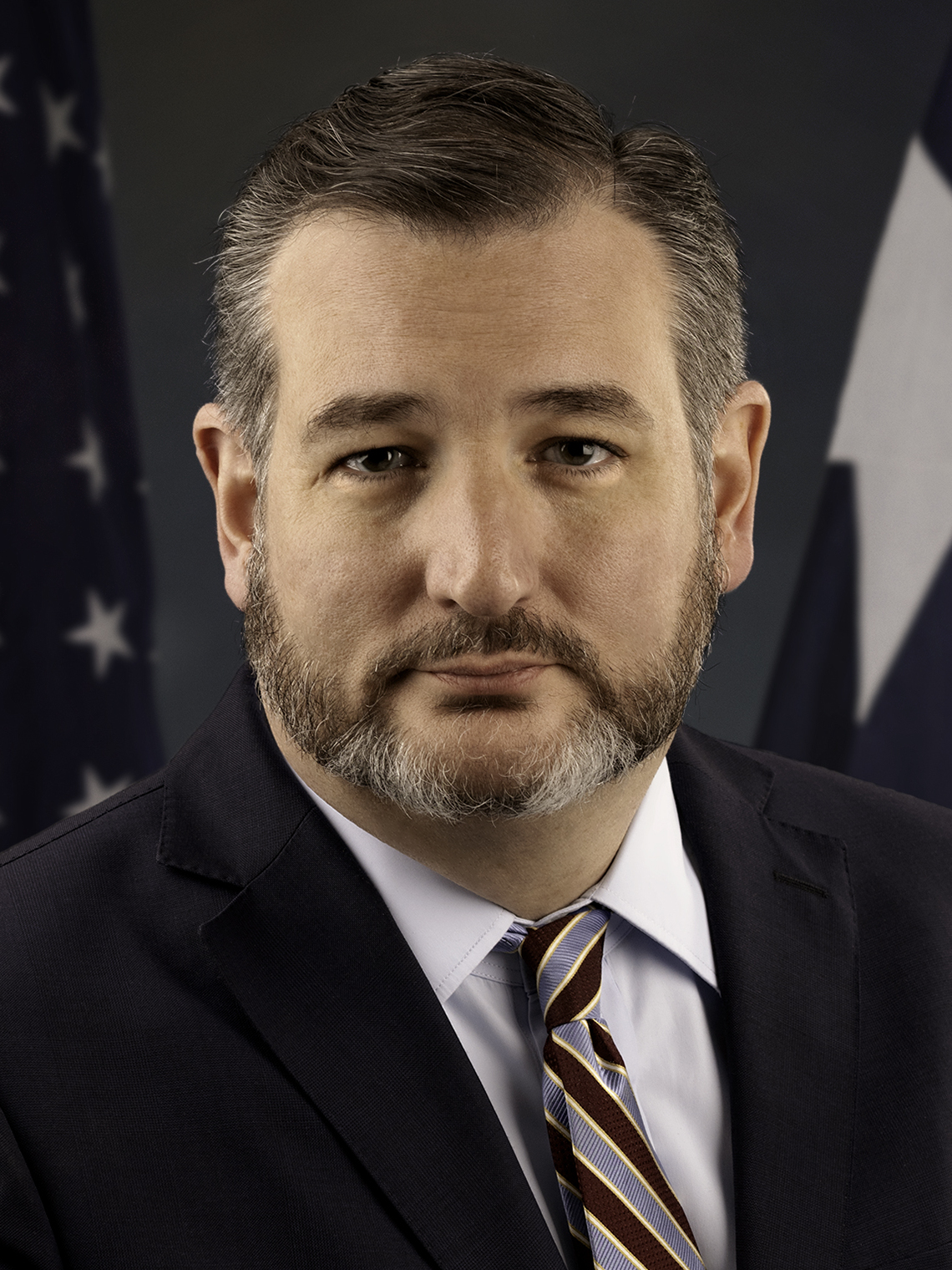
Junior U.S. Senator Ted Cruz

==== U.S. House of Representatives ====
Of the 38 Texas seats in the U.S. House of Representatives, 25 are currently held by Republicans:

District	Member	Photo
1st	Nathaniel Moran	
2nd	Dan Crenshaw	
2nd	Steve Toth (elect)	
3rd	Keith Self	
4th	Pat Fallon	
5th	Lance Gooden	
6th	Jake Ellzey	
8th	Morgan Luttrell	
8th	Jessica Steinmann (elect)	
10th	Michael McCaul	
10th	Chris Gober (elect)	
11th	August Pfluger	
12th	Craig Goldman	
13th	Ronny Jackson	
14th	Randy Weber	
15th	Monica De La Cruz	
17th	Pete Sessions	
19th	Jodey Arrington	
19th	Tom Sell (elect)	
21st	Chip Roy	
21st	Mark Teixeira (elect)	
22nd	Troy Nehls	
22nd	Trever Nehls (elect)	
24th	Beth Van Duyne	
25th	Roger Williams	
26th	Brandon Gill	
27th	Michael Cloud	
31st	John Carter	
32nd	Jace Yarbrough (elect)	
36th	Brian Babin	
38th	Wesley Hunt	
38th	Jon Bonck	

=== Statewide officials ===
Republicans currently hold all nine statewide elected offices in Texas:

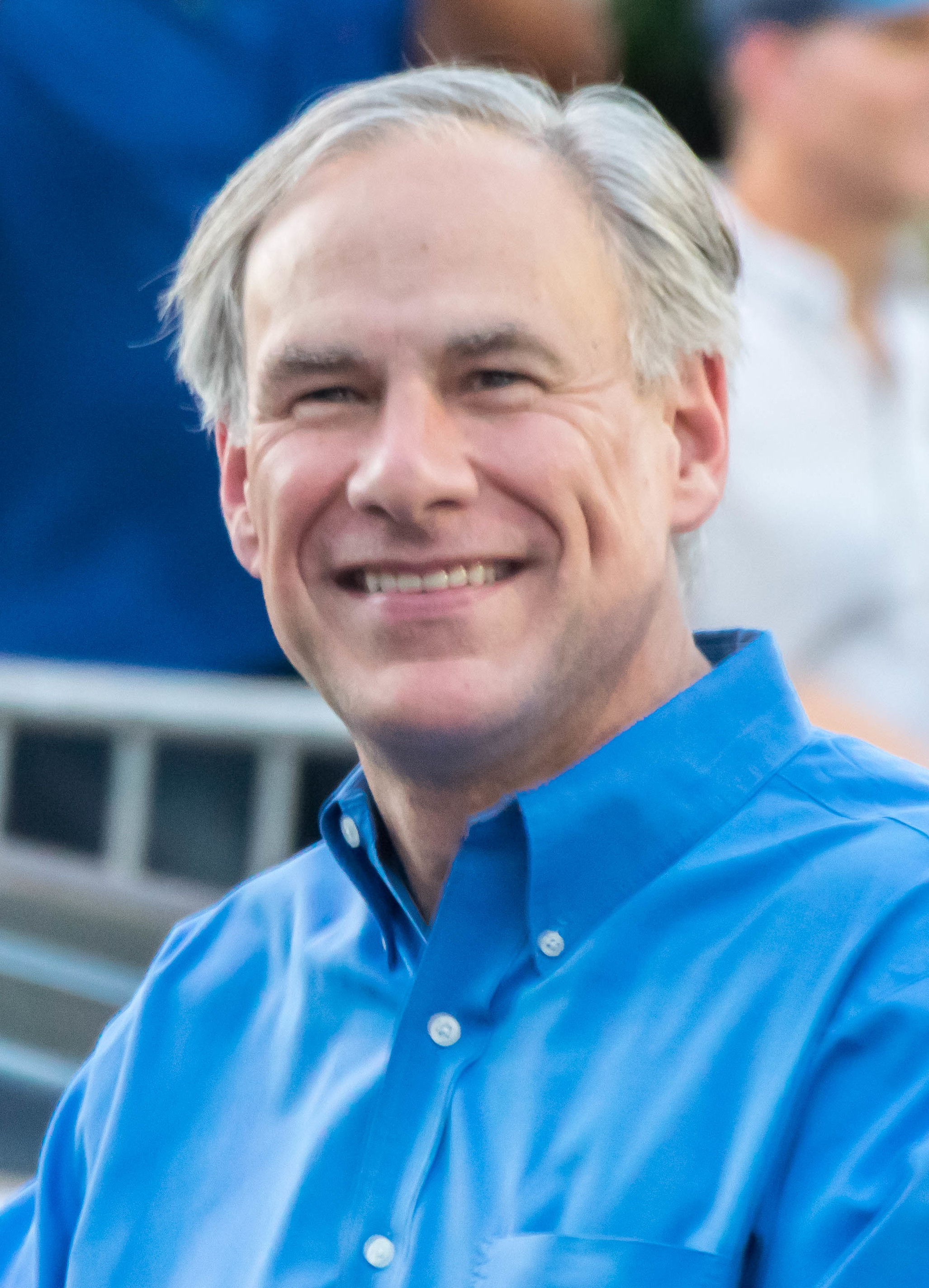
Governor: Greg Abbott

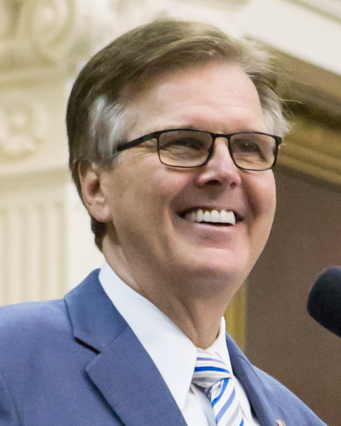
Lieutenant Governor: Dan Patrick

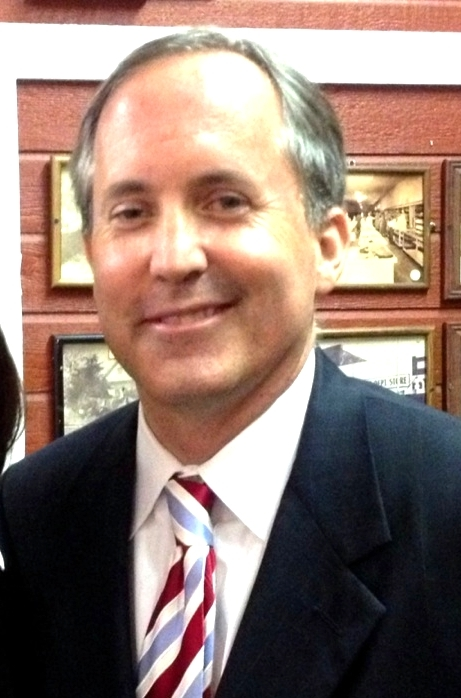
Attorney General: Ken Paxton

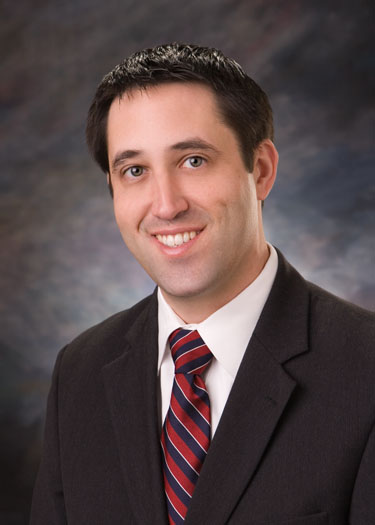
Comptroller of Public Accounts: Glenn Hegar

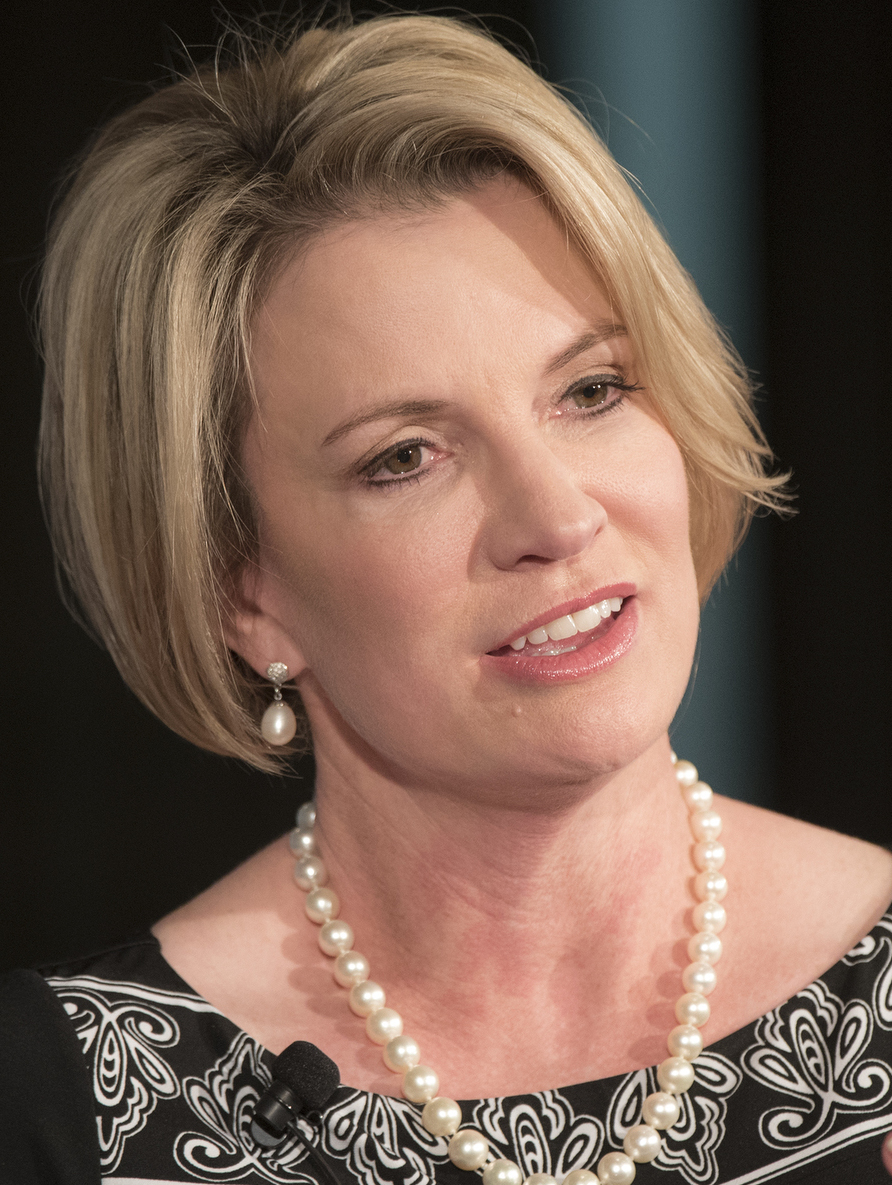
Land Commissioner: Dawn Buckingham

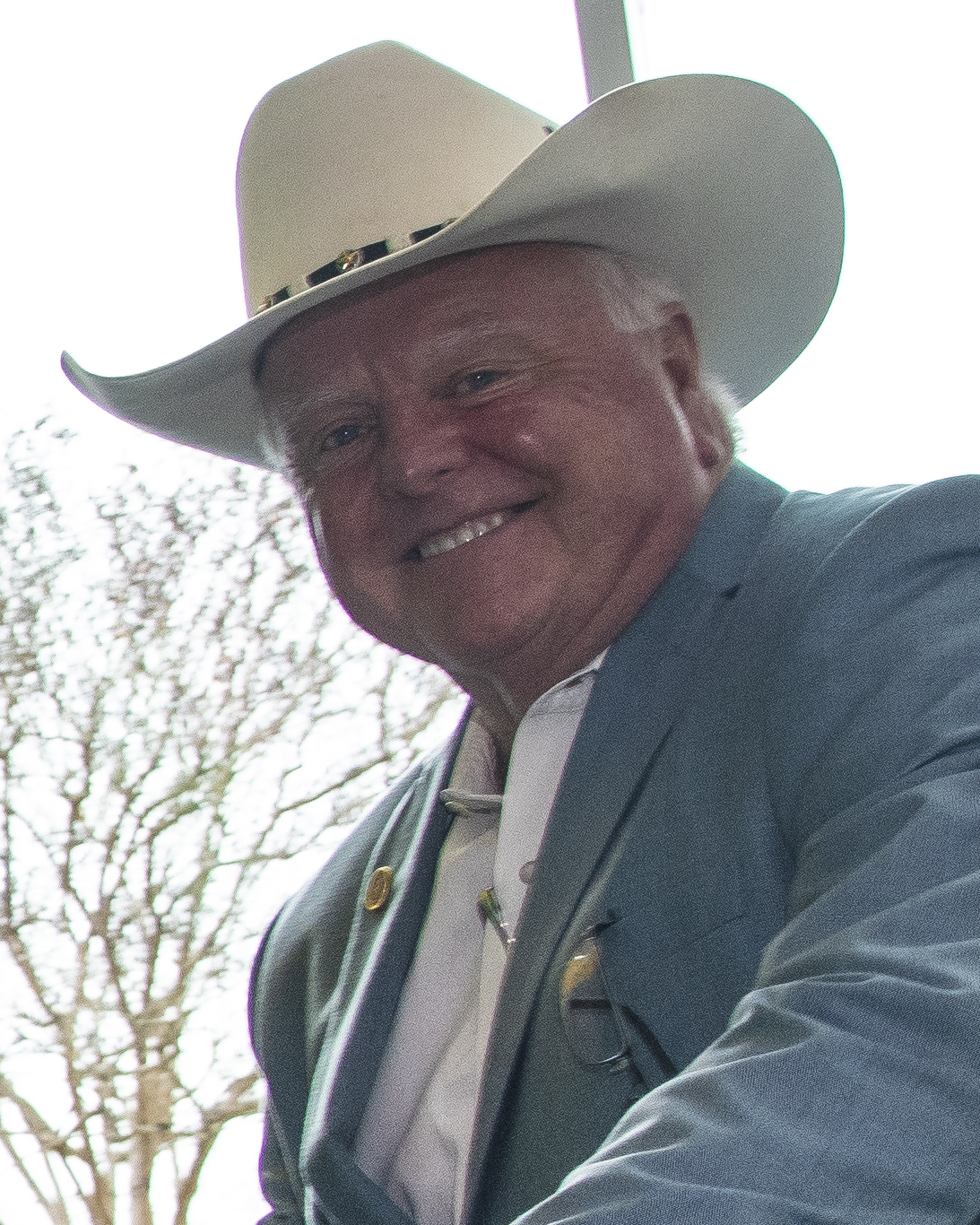
Agriculture Commissioner: Sid Miller

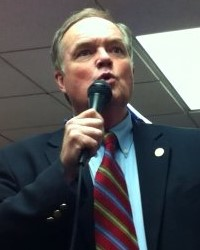
Railroad Commissioner: Wayne Christian

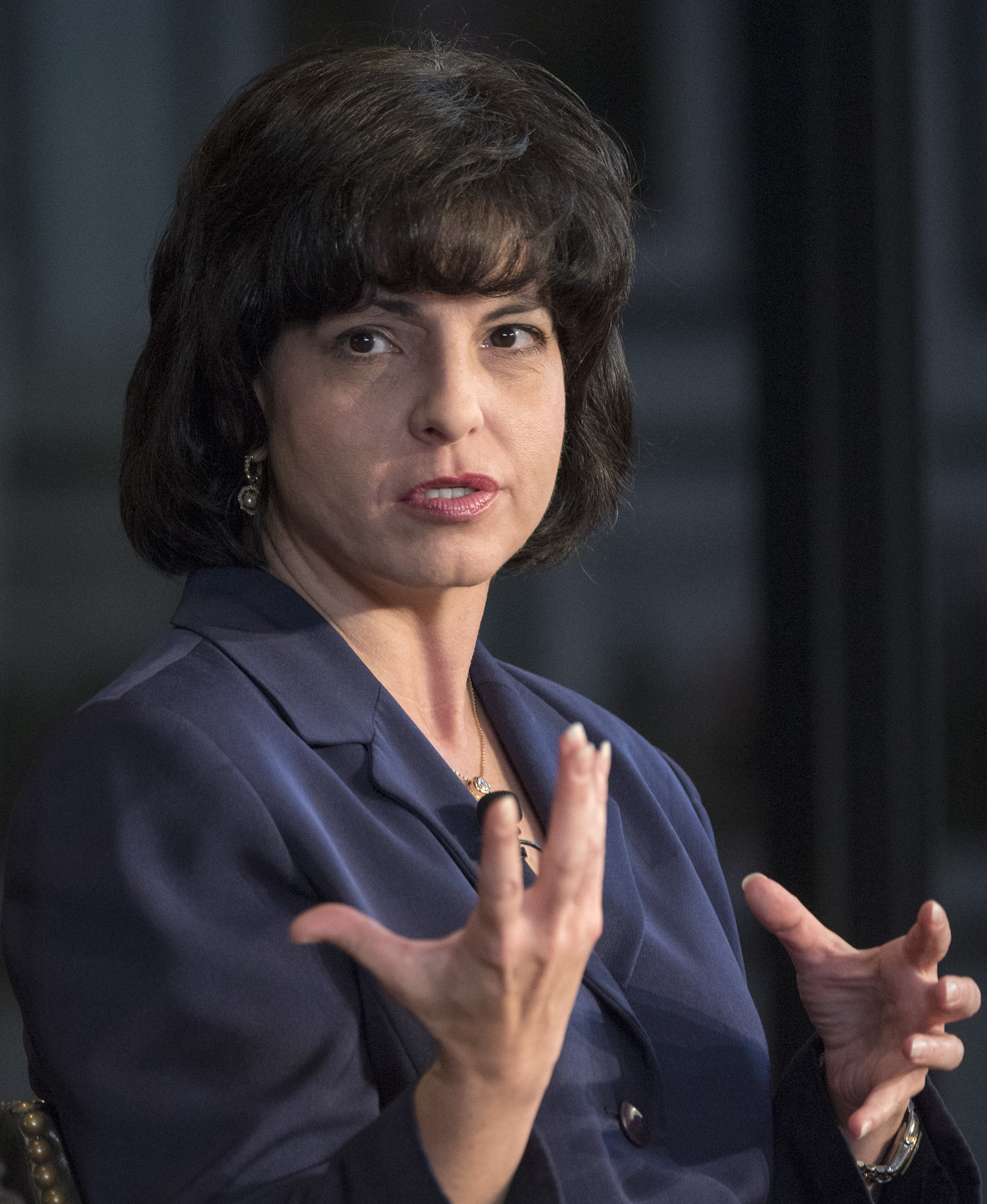
Railroad Commissioner: Christi Craddick

=== State legislative leaders ===
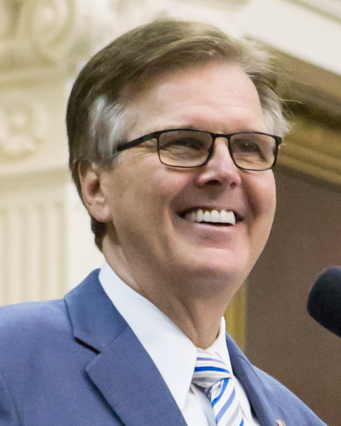
Lieutenant Governor: Dan Patrick

=== State Republican Executive Committee Members ===
Biannually, in even-numbered years, delegates at the Texas GOP State Convention elect one man and one woman from each of the 31 State Senate districts to serve a two-year term on the State Republican Executive Committee (SREC). Alongside the elected State Chair and Vice Chair, the SREC manages the party's affairs between conventions.

== List of state party chairs ==
=== 19th and early 20th century ===
- John L. Haynes (1867–?)
- Edmund J. Davis (1875–1883)
- Norris Wright Cuney (1886–1896)
- William Madison McDonald (1897–1898)
- Henry Clay Ferguson (1898–1900)
- Cecil A. Lyon (1900–1916)
- Rentfro Creager (1920–1950)
- Orville Bullington (1951–1952)
- Carlos Watson (1952)
- Thad Hutcheson (1957–1960)
- Tad Smith (1961–1962)

=== Since 1962 ===
- Peter O'Donnell (1962–1969)
- William Steger (1969–1971)
- (Missing records) (1971–1976)
- Ray Hutchison (1976–1977)
- Ray Barnhart (1977–1979)
- Chet Upham (1979–1983)
- George Strake Jr. (1983–1988)
- Fred Meyer (1988–1994)
- Tom Pauken (1994–1997)
- Susan Weddington (1997–2003)
- Tina Benkiser (2003–2009)
- Cathie Adams (2009–2010)
- Steve Munisteri (2010–2015)
- Tom Mechler (2015–2017)
- James Dickey (2017–2020)
- Allen West (2020–2021)
- Matt Rinaldi (2021–2024)
- Abraham George (2024–2026)
- D'Rinda Randall (2026-present)

== Auxiliary and partner organizations ==
The party has a number of partner and auxiliary organizations, including:

- the Texas Federation of College Republicans,
- the High School Republicans of Texas,
- the Texas Federation of Republican Women (TFRW),
- the Texas Republican County Chairmen's Association,
- the Texas Republican Assembly,
- 150 Black Men of Texas,
- the Juan Seguin Society,
- the Young Republicans of Texas,
- the Texas Asian Republican Assembly,
- the MLK Association,
- the National Federation of Pachyderms – Texas Chapter, and
- the Republican Liberty Caucus of Texas.

== Electoral history ==
=== Gubernatorial ===
Texas Republican Party gubernatorial election results
Election	Gubernatorial candidate	Votes	Vote %	Result
1990	Clayton Williams	1,826,431	46.9%	Lost ✗
1994	George W. Bush	2,350,994	53.5%	Won ✓
1998	George W. Bush	2,550,821	68.2%	Won ✓
2002	Rick Perry	2,632,591	57.8%	Won ✓
2006	Rick Perry	1,716,803	39.0% (4-way race)	Won ✓
2010	Rick Perry	2,737,481	54.97%	Won ✓
2014	Greg Abbott	2,796,547	59.27%	Won ✓
2018	Greg Abbott	4,656,196	55.81%	Won ✓
2022	Greg Abbott	4,437,099	54.76%	Won ✓
2026	Greg Abbott	4,525,947	45.68%	Lost ✗

=== State legislature ===
House
Election year	No. of overall seats won	+/–	Governor	Reference
1964	1 / 150	Steady	John Connally	
1966	7 / 150	▲6	John Connally	
1968	9 / 150	▲2	John Connally	
1970	10 / 150	▲1	Preston Smith	
1972	17 / 150	▲7	Preston Smith	
1974	16 / 150	▼1	Dolph Briscoe	
1976	22 / 150	▲6	Dolph Briscoe	
1978	19 / 150	▼3	Dolph Briscoe	
1980	35 / 150	▲16	Bill Clements	
1982	36 / 150	▲1	Bill Clements	
1984	52 / 150	▲16	Mark White	
1986	56 / 150	▲4	Mark White	

Senate
Election year	No. of overall seats won	+/–	Governor	Reference
1964	0 / 31	Steady	John Connally	
1966	1 / 31	▲1	John Connally	
1968	2 / 31	▲1	John Connally	
1970	2 / 31	Steady	Preston Smith	
1972	3 / 31	▲1	Preston Smith	
1974	3 / 31	Steady	Dolph Briscoe	
1976	4 / 31	▲1	Dolph Briscoe	
1978	5 / 31	▲1	Dolph Briscoe	
1980	8 / 31	▲3	Bill Clements	
1982	5 / 31	▼3	Bill Clements	
1984	6 / 31	▲1	Mark White	
1986	6 / 31	Steady	Mark White	

== Works cited ==
- Abbott, Richard (1986). The Republican Party and the South, 1855–1877: The First Southern Strategy. University of North Carolina Press. ISBN 0807816809.
- Moreland, Laurence; Steed, Robert; Baker, Tod, eds. (1991). The 1988 Presidential Election in the South: Continuity Amidst Change in Southern Party Politics. Praeger Publishers. ISBN 0275931455.
