= Cody Vasut =

American politician (born 1987)

Member of the Texas House of Representatives from the 25th district
- Incumbent
- Assumed office January 12, 2021
- Preceded by: Dennis Bonnen

Personal details
- Born: Cody Thane Vasut; August 13, 1987 (age 39) Houston, Texas, U.S.
- Party: Republican
- Spouse: Kate Samuel
- Children: 3
- Education: Texas A&M University (BBA, MS); University of Houston Law Center(JD)
- Occupation: Attorney
- Website: Campaign website

Cody Thane Vasut (born August 13, 1987) is an American politician. He has represented the 25th District in the Texas House of Representatives since 2021. A member of the Republican Party, Vasut also works as an attorney.

== Early life, education, and career ==
Born in Houston to John and Pella Vasut. Vasut grew up in Brazoria County, Texas, where he then graduated from Angleton High School. He then went on to attend Texas A&M University, where he received a BBA and a MS in Management. As an undergraduate, Vasut was the 37th speaker of the Texas A&M student senate. Vasut later earned his Juris Doctor from the University of Houston Law Center in 2012.

== Career ==
From 2012 to 2022, he worked as an associate attorney for BakerHostetler in Houston. He was a councilmember for the city of Angleton from May 2016 to May 2020. During his time as councilmember, he voted to lower the property tax rate to the city to its lowest in decades, he also brought prayer into the meetings.

Vasut filed in 2019 to run for the Texas House of Representatives District 25 seat held by Dennis Bonnen, who announced in late 2019 that he would not seek re-election for the 87th legislature. Vasut won the 2020 election for the seat against Democratic nominee and former mayor of Angleton Patrick Henry with 71% of the vote in November 2020. Governor Greg Abbott had endorsed Vasut prior to the election.

Vasut is among the most conservative members of the Texas House. He is a member of the Texas Freedom Caucus, a faction of hardline conservative legislators. Analysis of voting records by Rice University's James A. Baker III Institute for Public Policy analysis of voting records found that Vasut was the fifth-most right-wing member of the Texas House in 2021, and the third-most right-wing member of the Texas House (after Jared Patterson and Briscoe Cain) in 2023.

In 2022, amid a school voucher debate in Texas, Vasut filed a bill for the state to reimburse parents for private school tuition. In 2023, Vasut authored an amendment to the state budget to allocate $80 million in state funds to anti-abortion crisis pregnancy centers; the amendment passed along party lines.

In 2023, Vasut served as one of the twelve House impeachment managers (consisting of seven Republicans and five Democrats) charged with prosecuting Texas Attorney General Ken Paxton during his impeachment trial.

Vasut supports a ban on Democrats being given committee chairmanships as long as the Republicans hold the majority of seats in the Texas House.

In August 2025, Vasut was appointed chairman of the committee regarding 2025 Texas redistricting.

Texas House of Representatives
Preceded by Dennis Bonnen	Member of the Texas House of Representatives from the 25th district 2021–present	Incumbent
