= Young Republicans of Texas =

Political youth group

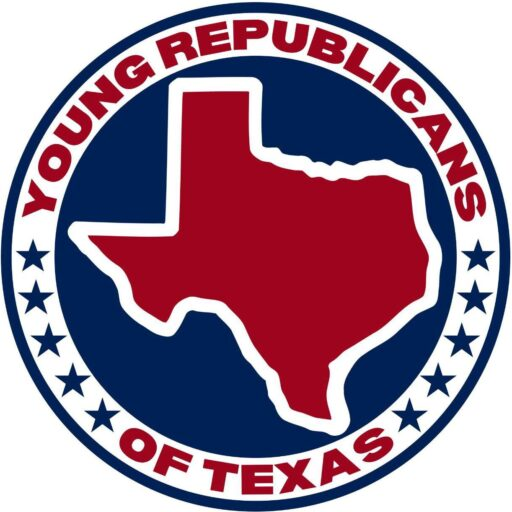
- Abbreviation: YRT
- Chairman: Isaac Laster
- Founded: September 2023
- Ideology: Republican

Website
- https://yrtx.gop

The Young Republicans of Texas (YRT) is a political youth group based in Texas. It serves as the official youth auxiliary club of the Republican Party of Texas (RPT). Founded in 2023, the organization was formed following a split from the state's previous youth wing, the Texas Young Republican Federation (TYRF). This separation led to a lawsuit over trademark dispute, which was ultimately resolved by a state appellate court in 2024.

== History ==
Prior to late 2023, the Republican Party of Texas was affiliated with the Texas Young Republican Federation. After a disagreement between leadership, a group separated away to form the Young Republicans of Texas. In September 2023, the State Republican Executive Committee (SREC) voted to recognize the Young Republicans of Texas as the organization's official youth affiliate. The formation was publicly acknowledged by state officials, including Attorney General Ken Paxton.

== Legal disputes ==
Shortly after YRT's formation, the TYRF filed a lawsuit in Dallas County alleging trademark infringement, arguing that the defendants used the "Young Republicans" name without authorization. A district court initially granted a temporary restraining order (TRO) against YRT.

The defendants sought dismissal under the Texas Citizens Participation Act (TCPA), the state's anti-SLAPP statute protecting free speech. In August 2024, the Fifth Court of Appeals of Texas reversed the lower court's decision and dismissed the claims, citing the failure of plaintiffs to meet the necessary burden of proof.

== Political positions ==
The organization has distinguished itself through policy stances on federal immigration and labor issues. In August 2025, YRT announced it would withhold endorsements from national candidates who supported the H-1B visa program. Later in November, the group publicly urged the presidential administration to end the Optional Practice Training (OPT) program, arguing that the program was negatively affecting young American workers.

== Controversies ==
=== 2023 antisemitism and white nationalist allegations ===
In October 2023, several news outlets reported on controversy surrounding the Republican Party of Texas's affiliation with the newly formed Young Republicans of Texas. The controversy followed a broader dispute between the Republican Party of Texas and the Texas Young Republican Federation, which had previously served as the state party's Young Republican affiliate.

The San Antonio Express-News reported that, before the state party affiliated with YRT, members of the Texas Young Republican Federation and others had warned state party officials that some people associated with the new organization had made or supported antisemitic posts online. According to the newspaper, the State Republican Executive Committee voted 43-18 to affiliate with YRT. The article reported that Noah Coffee, who had been listed as YRT secretary, was later removed from the organization's website after criticism of his social media activity.

The Texas Tribune reported that the controversy involved warnings that leaders of the newly formed group included people with openly antisemitic views and ties to white nationalist figures. The Tribune also reported that an independent journalist had documented YRT leaders praising Adolf Hitler online and appearing outside an event associated with Nick Fuentes's "groyper" movement.

YRT president Chad Cohen said in an October 2023 statement that "a few individuals" belonging to YRT member chapters had engaged in online behavior that promoted bigotry and antisemitism. Cohen said the organization had failed to evaluate members' online histories, but said the failure was not intentional. He also said YRT condemned bigotry and that individuals had been removed from leadership at the state and chapter level.

The controversy also led to internal Republican criticism. Two Republican Party of Texas executive committee members called on the state party to reconsider its affiliation with YRT, writing that concerns raised during the vetting process had not been given sufficient weight. The Daily Beast reported that Gulf Coast Young Republicans and Rural Young Republicans disaffiliated from YRT after the allegations, saying in a joint statement that subsequent reporting had shown their chapters were misled about members who did not reflect their values.

=== 2025 group chat response ===
In October 2025, after Politico reported on a leaked private chat involving Young Republican leaders from several states, the Young Republicans of Texas declined to issue a condemnation. Chron reported that the messages included racist, antisemitic, misogynistic language and praise of Adolf Hitler, but also noted that Young Republicans of Texas was separate from Texas Young Republicans, the group formally recognized by the Young Republican National Federation.

== See also ==
- Republican Party of Texas
