= Phil Wilson (Texas politician) =

American politician (born 1967)

106th Secretary of State of Texas
- In office July 1, 2007 – July 6, 2008
- Governor: Rick Perry
- Preceded by: Roger Williams
- Succeeded by: Esperanza Andrade

Personal details
- Born: October 5, 1967 (age 59) Monterrey, Mexico
- Party: Republican
- Education: Hardin–Simmons University (B.A.); Southern Methodist University (M.A.)

Samuel Philip "Phil" Wilson (born October 5, 1967) is a Texas politician who served as the Secretary of State of Texas from 2007 to 2008.

== Early life and education ==
Samuel Philip Wilson was born on October 5, 1967 in Monterrey, Mexico to Samuel and Betty Wilson. He grew up in Brownwood, Texas, where his father was a professor at the Douglas MacArthur Academy of Freedom located at Howard Payne University. In 1986, He moved to Northern Texas to attend the Hardin–Simmons University. During his time at Hardin-Simmons University, he was an active member and officer of numerous student organizations. He was the president of his freshman class, a founding member of Theta Alpha Zeta, and was named to Who's Who in American Colleges and Universities. He was also editor of the yearbook, the President of the Student Activities Council, Student Communication Association, and Law and Politics Club, the Vice President of Student Congress, and performed in several theatre productions. He received the Tomorrow's Leaders Today award and the George Skiles Anderson Award for outstanding male graduate. He graduated in 1990 with a Bachelors of Arts Degree in Political Science and History. Wilson received the Master of Business Administration degree at the Cox School of Business at the Southern Methodist University in 2004

== Career ==
In 1991, Wilson had a exceptional professional journey on public service for serving six years as the Regional Director for Phil Gramm. He also served as the aide to U.S. Senator Phil Gramm and an advocate for the public. In 1997, He accepted the position of Director of Communications for Texas Railroad Commissioner Charles Matthews. In 1999, He became the State Director of Operations for Phil Gramm and the people of Texas. In 2002, He became the Director of Communications for Texas. In 2003, He was named the Governor's Deputy Chief of Staff.

On June 14, 2007, Phil Wilson was appointed Secretary of State of Texas by Governor Rick Perry, He took the office on July 1, 2007. He resigned as Secretary of State of Texas on July 6, 2008. He announced this on June 11, 2008, with his reason for resignation being to pursue other opportunities. After resigning as Secretary of State of Texas, he became a Senior Vice President of Public Affairs for Luminant. In 2011, He became the Executive Director of the Texas Department of Transportation. On February 3, 2014, He became the General Manager of the Lower Colorado River Authority. He was appointed Chair of the State Energy Plan Advisory Committee by Governor Greg Abbott in 2021. In March 2026, He stepped down from his General Manager role at the Lower Colorado River Authority to pursue a new opportunity. After he stepped down his General Manager role, he received the 2026 John Lay River Hero Award by the Colorado River Alliance in September 2026.

== Personal life ==
In 1992, Wilson married Kristen Wilson. They had one child named Christian, Who is a kicker for Trinity University Football.
