= Susan Weddington =

American politician (1951–2020)

Susan Baker Weddington

Chairman of the Texas Republican Party
- In office 1997–2003
- Preceded by: Tom Pauken
- Succeeded by: Tina Benkiser

Personal details
- Born: April 6, 1951 Detroit, Michigan, US
- Died: September 1, 2020 (aged 69) San Antonio, Texas, US
- Spouse(s): Ernest Caldwell, Jr. d. Robert Weddington (1983–2015)
- Children: 1
- Education: Trinity University
- Occupation: Businesswoman

Susan Baker Weddington (April 6, 1951 – September 1, 2020) was a businesswoman who from 1997 to 2003 served as party chair of Texas Republican Party during the administrations of Governors George W. Bush and Rick Perry She was the first female chair of either major party in Texas.

== Background ==
Born in Detroit, Michigan, Weddington moved to San Antonio before she was eighteen months of age. She is one of two children of the late Louis C. Baker and the former Elaine Baird. She has a brother, David Baker.

Weddington graduated in 1969 from Alamo Heights High School in San Antonio. and after that from Trinity University in San Antonio, from which she received a bachelor's degree in communications and was for a time an instructor of photojournalism.

== Political life ==
The firm Kinetic Concepts formerly employed Weddington. A Christian conservative activist, Weddington became interested in politics as the mother of a teenaged son visiting the Texas State Capitol in Austin. Her particular interests at the time were education and product liability laws.

In 1990, Weddington placed a black wreath that read "Death to the Family" at the door of the campaign headquarters in Austin for the Democratic gubernatorial nominee, Ann Richards, the state treasurer. At the state Republican convention that year, she participated in a prayer rally and called upon the Almighty to "watch over the caucus rooms and the convention hall."

In 1997, Weddington was unanimously elected state chairwoman by the Republican state executive committee to succeed conservative Tom Pauken of Dallas, who resigned after three years in the position to run for state attorney general. She was Pauken's choice as his successor. For part of her tenure, the vice chairman was the conservative author and activist David Barton. Weddington held support from both the religious conservative wing of her party and the fiscal conservatives. Chuck Anderson, then the executive director of the Christian Coalition, described Weddington as "very, very well respected by members of the party from all ideological stripes." In 2000, Republicans held 1,600 of the approximately 4,000 elected offices in Texas but all statewide offices. Weddington said that she was determined to bring the party to long-term majority status, with particular emphasis on the state legislature.

In 2002, Weddington broke with tradition as state chair when she became involved in a heated Republican primary for the District 25 state Senate seat in San Antonio in which Republican Jeff Wentworth ran successfully for re-nomination. One of her predecessors as chairman, Fred Meyer of Dallas, had pointedly refused to become involved in such primary races but stood with the general election nominees regardless of policy positions.

When she stepped down as state chairwoman in 2003, her party had gained a firm footing in major political offices in Texas. Weddington for six years then headed the OneStar Foundation, a non-profit organization formed by Governor Rick Perry to connect such organizations with resources and expertise to accomplish their missions and to promote volunteerism. She was succeeded as chairman by another woman, Tina Benkiser, a lawyer from Houston.

== Personal life ==
Weddington retired in 2009, and Perry named Elizabeth Seale her successor at the OneStar Foundation. In the 2010 Republican gubernatorial primary, Weddington came out of retirement to endorse Rick Perry, who defeated two female challengers, including U.S. Senator Kay Bailey Hutchison. Weddington retired to Gillespie County near Fredericksburg in the Texas Hill Country with her second husband, George Robert "Bob" Weddington, whom she married in San Antonio on April 1, 1983.

Party political offices
Preceded by Tom Pauken	Chair of the Texas Republican Party; 1997–2003	Succeeded by Tina Benkiser
