= John Steen (Texas politician) =

American politician

John Thomas Steen Jr.

108th Secretary of State of Texas
- In office November 27, 2012 – January 2014
- Governor: Rick Perry
- Preceded by: Esperanza Andrade
- Succeeded by: Nandita Berry

Personal details
- Born: c. 1949 (age 76–77)
- Party: Republican
- Spouse: Ida Louise Clement Steen
- Children: John T. Steen III Ida "Illa" Louise Larkin Steen Gaunt James Higbie Clement "Jamey" Steen
- Education: Princeton University (Bachelor of Arts); University of Texas at Austin (Juris Doctor)
- Occupation: Lawyer
- Awards: Commander's Award for Public Service

Military service
- Branch/service: United States Army Reserve
- Rank: Second Lieutenant

John Thomas Steen Jr. (born c. 1949), is a lawyer from San Antonio, Texas, who served as the Texas Secretary of State from 2012 to 2014. Steen was appointed by Governor Rick Perry on November 27, 2012, after Esperanza Andrade resigned four days earlier from the position that she had held for more than four years. Steen is Texas' 108th Secretary of State and one of six officials to have formed the Executive Department of state government.

After just over a year in the position, Steen resigned and was succeeded on January 7, 2014, by another Perry appointee, Nandita Berry, an Indian native and naturalized American citizen from Houston.

== Background ==
Steen is one of five children born to John Steen Sr. (1922–2003), a native of Yoakum in southeast Texas, who owned insurance companies and also held ranching interests in surrounding counties. His mother was the former Nell Donnell, who predeceased her husband. The senior Steen was the last chairman of the San Antonio Good Government League and was active in the 1976 United States Bicentennial and in the National Conference of Christians and Jews. For twenty years, the senior Steen was an elected member of the Alamo Community College District. He served two terms on the San Antonio City Council and was an unsuccessful candidate for mayor in 1981 to succeed Lila Cockrell, but Henry Cisneros was instead elected to the first of four two-year terms in the position.

Steen is married to the former Ida Louise Clement, a past member of the Texas State Preservation Board in Austin, the panel which oversees the management of the State Capitol, the governor's mansion, and the Bob Bullock Texas State History Museum. She is a former regent of the Texas A&M University System. Mrs. Steen is a descendant of Richard King, the steamboat captain who in 1853 established the King Ranch, still owned by her family. Her father, James H. Clement, was the president and chief executive of King Ranch. Her paternal grandfather, Martin W. Clement, was the president and chairman of the Pennsylvania Railroad. Her maternal grandfather, John A. Larkin, was a founder and the vice chairman of the Celanese Corporation of America, now based in Dallas.

The Steens have three children, John Steen III, James Higbie Clement "Jamey" Steen, and Ida "Illa" Louise Larkin Steen Gaunt, who is married to William Hartley Gaunt of Houston, who has roots in Indiana and Kansas. The Gaunts were wed at the King Ranch in 2012.

John Steen's siblings are the late Nancy Nell Steen Boyce; Susan Margaret Steen Fainter, wife of John Wells Fainter Jr., of Austin and the 93rd Texas Secretary of State; Rolly Robert Steen, II, M.D., of Dallas and the namesake of his paternal grandfather, and Stewart James Steen of Kerrville, Texas.

== Career ==
Steen received his undergraduate degree from Princeton University in Princeton, New Jersey, and his doctorate of jurisprudence from the University of Texas School of Law at Austin. Most recently while engaged in the private practice of law in San Antonio, Steen served under appointment of Governor Perry as a commissioner of the Texas Department of Public Safety. He is a former gubernatorial appointee to the Texas Commission on Economy and Efficiency in State Government and the Texas Alcoholic Beverage Commission, on which he served for ten years, the last six as the chairman.

Political offices
Preceded by Hope Andrade	Secretary of State of Texas; 2012–	Succeeded by Nandita Berry
