= Tim Pataki =

American political aide (born 1985)

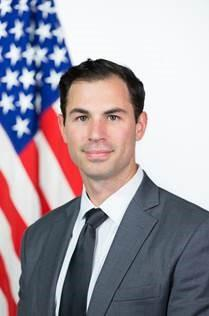

Director of the Office of Public Liaison
- In office February 2, 2019 – January 20, 2021
- President: Donald Trump
- Preceded by: Steve Munisteri (Acting)
- Succeeded by: Cedric Richmond

Personal details
- Born: April 2, 1985 (age 41) Baltimore, Maryland, U.S.
- Party: Republican
- Education: Ohio State University (BA)

Timothy Pataki is an American political aide who served as the director of the Office of Public Liaison from 2019 to 2021. Pataki previously served as Special Assistant to President Donald Trump and Deputy Director of the Office of Public Liaison, serving under Justin Clark.

== Early life and education ==
Pataki was born on April 2, 1985, in Baltimore, Maryland. After graduating from Loyola Blakefield, he earned a Bachelor of Arts degree in Communications from Ohio State University, where he played on the Ohio State Buckeyes men's lacrosse team.

== Career ==
Pataki began his career in politics as a legislative aide to Kevin McCarthy during his time as House Majority Leader. He also served as a floor aide to Eric Cantor, and as a staffer for the United States House Committee on Energy and Commerce.

Political offices
Preceded by Steve Munisteri; Acting	Director of the Office of Public Liaison; 2019–2021	Succeeded by Cedric Richmond
