= Cathie Adams =

American politician (born 1950)

Cathie Louise Adams

Chair of the Republican Party of Texas
- In office October 24, 2009 – June 12, 2010
- Preceded by: Tina Benkiser
- Succeeded by: Stephen P. Munisteri

Republican National Committeewoman from Texas
- In office 2008–2009
- Preceded by: Denise McNamara
- Succeeded by: Deborah "Borah" Van Dormoleon

Personal details
- Born: January 8, 1950 (age 76)
- Spouse: Homer Charles Adams
- Children: 1
- Occupation: Political activist

Cathie Louise Adams (born January 8, 1950) is a Texas politician. She served as party chair of the Republican Party of Texas from October 2009 to June 2010.

In April 2016, Adams broke with Phyllis Schlafly over Schlafly's endorsement on March 11 of Donald Trump for the 2016 Republican presidential nomination. Adams instead supported U.S. Senator Ted Cruz of Texas, Trump's principal challenger whom Adams considers a more conservative choice. Adams subsequently lost the race for vice-chairman in 2016 to Amy Clark of Floresville, south of San Antonio. Incumbent chairman Tom Mechler of Amarillo retained his post after opponent Jared Woodfill of Houston withdrew before final balloting.

Preceded by Tina Benkiser	Texas Republican Party State Chairman; 2009–2010	Succeeded by Stephen P. Munisteri
Preceded by Denise McNamara	Texas Republican Party National Committeewoman; 2008–2009	Succeeded by Deborah "Borah" Van Dormoleon
