= Tina Benkiser =

American lawyer (born 1963)

Tina J. Benkiser

Chair of the Texas Republican Party
- In office 2003–2009
- Preceded by: Susan Weddington
- Succeeded by: Cathie Adams

Personal details
- Born: February 7, 1963 (age 63)
- Spouse: Eric Benkiser
- Occupation: Attorney

Tina Renee Johns Benkiser (born February 7, 1963) is an attorney and the former party chair of the Republican Party of Texas. She was elected to the post upon the resignation of Susan Weddington in 2003 and resigned in 2009 to serve as a senior adviser to Governor Rick Perry’s campaign for re-election.

Preceded by Susan Weddington	Republican Party of Texas State Chair; 2003–2009	Succeeded by Cathie Adams
