= Young Conservatives of Texas =

Conservative youth organization

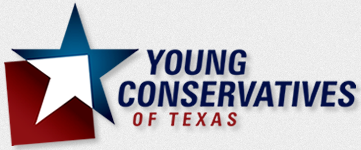
- Motto(s): "Pro Libertas. Pro Texana." and "Principles over Party"
- Founded: 1980
- Split from: Young Americans for Freedom
- Headquarters: Austin, Texas
- Ideology: Fiscal Conservatism, Social Conservatism
- Website: yct.org

Young Conservatives of Texas (YCT) is a conservative youth organization based in Texas. Founded in 1980, it has chapters at 20 universities—including Baylor University, the University of North Texas, Texas A&M University, Texas State University, the University of Texas at Austin, Trinity University, University of Mary Hardin-Baylor, Texas Wesleyan University, St. Edwards University, and Texas Tech University.

== History ==
Young Conservatives of Texas was formed by a faction that split off from Young Americans for Freedom (YAF) in 1980. A total of 177 delegates attended the first convention.

The Texas chapter of YAF, led by student activist Steve Munisteri, broke off after a dispute with the national organization. The Young Conservatives of Texas was founded on March 2, 1980, (Texas Independence Day) in Austin. There was a convention held that day wherein Congressman Bill Archer, Ernest Angelo (former Mayor of Midland and former National Committeeman), and many others spoke at a gathering to launch the group. A total of 177 persons attended part or all of the convention. At the conclusion of the convention, it was decided that Young Conservatives of Texas would be founded.

== Controversies ==
On October 1, 2013, the Young Conservatives chapter at UT Austin held a bake sale to show the effects of affirmative action on minorities. Prices were different depending on the person's race. The head of the chapter Lorenzo Garcia said they wanted to show how affirmative action can be more harmful than helpful and said it can cause reverse racism. However, it received negative reactions even from the school's own news columnist. Pavel Nitchovski, a columnist at the Horn, a local newspaper that covers UT Austin said "What’s so sad about this whole bake sale (aside from its utter tastelessness and caricaturization of a very serious issue) is that the people involved actually think that they’re making a valid intellectual point with their childish actions," Nitchovski wrote. "They are convinced that rather than behaving like attention-seeking children, they are genuinely starting an intellectual discourse."

The next month, the same chapter made national headlines when they proposed an on-campus game called "Catch an Illegal Immigrant," involving students in red shirts that said Illegal Immigrant whose capture would net a player $25. They cancelled plans after criticism from other students, the administration, and State Attorney General Greg Abbott, a Republican. This time chapter head Garcia said, "The idea for the event was intentionally over-the-top in order to get attention for the subject."

The University of North Texas chapter has faced their own controversies, one of which being a pro-ICE demonstration during the Student Government's Abolish ICE event. The group faced a lot of backlash with their response to the rally, and some students even claimed that YCT was there to sabotage the protest by calling in ICE. "Trejo also said the YCT threatened to call ICE on their protest, which was denied by Kelly Neidert, Chairman of the YCT."

The UNT chapter of the YCT also received backlash from the community regarding an "Affirmative Action Bake Sale", in which they charged different genders and races different prices.
