= Roger Williams (Texas politician) =

American politician and businessman (born 1949)

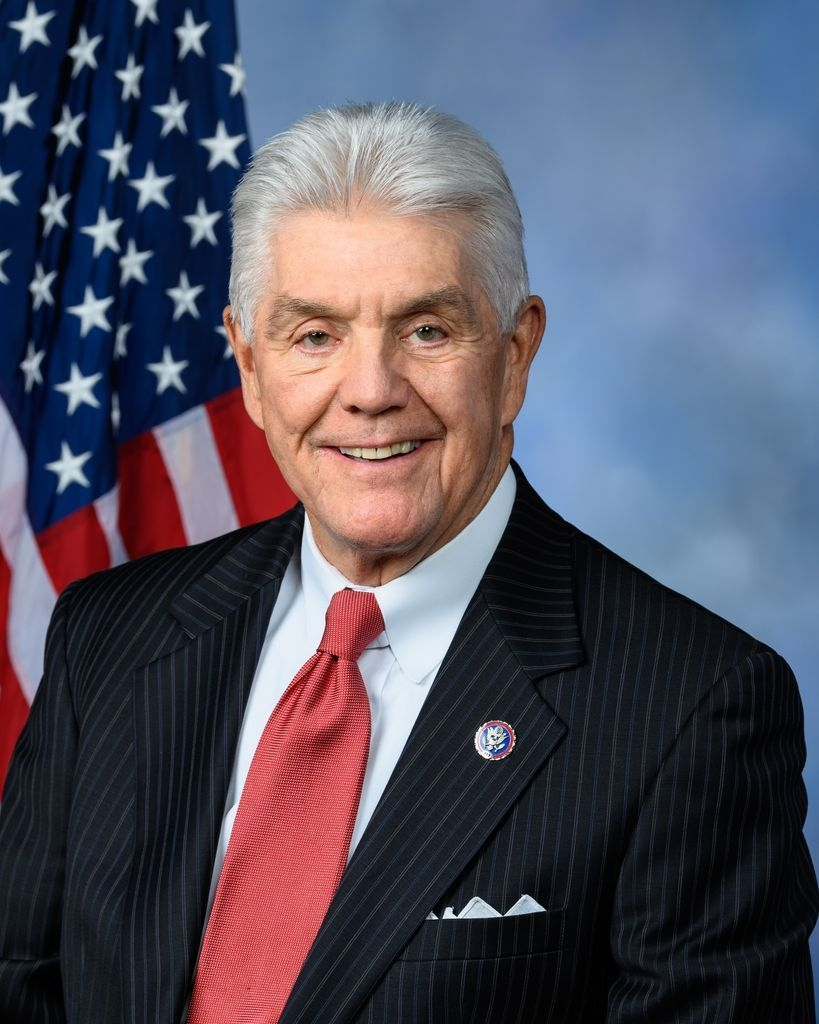
- Official portrait, 2022

Chair of the House Small Business Committee
- Incumbent
- Assumed office January 3, 2023
- Preceded by: Nydia Velázquez

Member of the U.S. House of Representatives from Texas's 25th district
- Incumbent
- Assumed office January 3, 2013
- Preceded by: Lloyd Doggett (redistricted)

105th Secretary of State of Texas
- In office February 8, 2005 – July 1, 2007
- Governor: Rick Perry
- Preceded by: Geoff Connor
- Succeeded by: Phil Wilson

Personal details
- Born: John Roger Williams; September 13, 1949 (age 76) Evanston, Illinois, U.S.
- Party: Republican
- Spouse: Patty Williams
- Children: 2
- Education: Texas Christian University (BA)
- Website: House website Campaign website
- Williams's voice Williams recognizing the 110th anniversary of the Rotary Club of Fort Worth, Texas. Recorded May 23, 2023

John Roger Williams (born September 13, 1949) is an American businessman and politician who has been the U.S. representative for Texas's 25th congressional district since 2013. A member of the Republican Party, he served as secretary of state of Texas from 2004 to 2007.

== Early life, education, and business career ==
Williams was born in Evanston, Illinois, in 1949 and raised in Fort Worth. He played college baseball for the Texas Christian University Horned Frogs (TCU) from 1968 to 1971 and was selected in the 25th round of the 1971 MLB draft by the Atlanta Braves, playing in the farm system and reaching the Class A Western Carolinas League. He coached TCU's baseball team. Williams inherited the family's automobile dealership from his father, who founded the business in 1939.

== Early political career ==
Williams began his political career as a fundraiser for Governor George W. Bush in his 1994 and 1998 elections. He became North Texas Chairman for the Bush/Cheney 2000 campaign, North Texas Finance Chairman in 2004, and National Grassroots Fundraising Chairman for the 2004 campaign.

Governor Rick Perry appointed Williams to be his fourth Secretary of State of Texas in 2004.

On June 11, 2007, Williams announced that he would resign as secretary of state, and late in 2008 he formed an exploratory committee to consider a run for the United States Senate seat held by Kay Bailey Hutchison, who had formed her own committee to consider a 2010 race for governor of Texas. Williams considered a run for Senate in 2012 but decided to run for the House of Representatives instead.

== U.S. House of Representatives ==
=== Elections ===
==== 2012 ====
In June 2011, Williams announced that he was dropping his Senate bid to instead run for Texas's 25th congressional district. The district was a newly drawn district stretching from central Austin to Burleson. Congressional district 25 has been cited as one of Texas's most gerrymandered districts. Williams began residing in the district the year of the election.

Williams ranked first with 25% of the vote and qualified for a runoff election. Wes Riddle ranked second with 15%. In the July 31 runoff, Williams defeated Riddle, 58% to 42%. In the November general election, Williams defeated Democratic nominee Elaine Henderson, 58%–37%.

==== 2014 ====
In the November 4 general election, Williams defeated Democrat Marco Montoya and Libertarian John Betz, receiving 107,120 votes (60.22%) to Montoya's 64,463 (36.24%) and Betz's 6,300 (3.54%). Williams unsuccessfully challenged National Republican Congressional Committee chair Greg Walden of Oregon in Walden's bid for reelection as chair after the election.

==== 2016 ====
Williams won his third term in the House on November 8, when Donald Trump carried the electoral vote majority over Hillary Rodham Clinton. Williams polled 180,988 votes (58.4%) to Democratic nominee Kathi Thomas's 117,073 (37.7%). Libertarian Loren Marc Schneiderman received 12,135 votes (3.9%).

==== 2018 ====
Williams won his fourth term in the House in the general election on November 6. With 162,288 votes (53.6%), he defeated Democratic nominee Julie Oliver, who polled 135,288 (44.7%). Another 5,124 (1.7%) went to the Libertarian Party nominee, Desarae Lindsey.

==== 2020 ====
Williams was reelected with 56% of the vote to Democratic nominee Julie Oliver's 42%. Libertarian nominee Bill Kelsey won 2% of the vote.

=== Tenure ===
In 2015, Williams condemned the Supreme Court's decision in Obergefell v. Hodges, which held that same-sex marriage bans violated the constitution.

Williams supported Trump's 2017 executive order imposing a ban on entry to the U.S. to citizens of seven Muslim-majority countries, calling it a "commonsense" measure and saying that opponents "are lost in the political correctness of this."

In October 2020, The Houston Chronicle reported that Williams had tried to help a donor in his dealings with a publicly traded bank.

==== 2016 House ethics review ====
On May 3, 2016, the House Ethics Committee initiated an investigation into Williams after he inserted a provision into a $300 billion transportation funding bill, the Fixing America's Surface Transportation Act, that exempted some car dealerships like his from a proposal to prevent rental car companies from renting out vehicles that were subject to safety recalls. The legislation was spurred by the deaths of Raechel and Jacqueline Houck, who were killed in 2004 while driving a rented, recalled vehicle that caught fire and crashed into a semi. The investigation's focus was a provision Williams authored that would have exempted dealerships like his and allowed renting vehicles under active safety recall. The independent nonpartisan Office of Congressional Ethics found that Williams violated House ethics rules, noting that he refused to cooperate; by unanimous, bipartisan vote the OCE found that "there is substantial reason to believe that Rep. Williams' personal financial interest in his auto dealership may be perceived as having influenced his performance of official duties—namely, his decision to offer an amendment to the surface transportation legislation". The House Ethics committee determined that the amendment "could have affected Representative Williams' personal financial interests" but decided to end the investigation and took no further action.

==== COVID-19 Paycheck Protection Program loan ====
During the COVID-19 pandemic, Williams's Chrysler Dodge Jeep dealership in Weatherford, Texas, received a loan of between $1 million and $2 million as part of the Paycheck Protection Program (PPP); the loan was later forgiven.

U.S. Representative Katie Porter later introduced legislation that would require all loans under the PPP to be made public. The Washington Post highlighted March 2020 comments by Williams in The Epoch Times, where he said, "A socialist wants you to get a check from the government...a capitalist wants you to get a check from the place that you work."

Williams voted against the TRUTH Act (H.R. 6782), a bill that would have required public disclosure of companies that received funds through the bailout program.

==== Texas v. Pennsylvania ====
In December 2020, Williams was one of 126 Republican members of the House of Representatives to sign an amicus brief in support of Texas v. Pennsylvania, a lawsuit filed at the United States Supreme Court contesting the results of the 2020 presidential election, in which Joe Biden defeated Trump. The Supreme Court declined to hear the case on the basis that Texas lacked standing under Article III of the Constitution to challenge the results of an election held by another state.

==== Financial disclosures ====
In September 2021, nonprofit group Campaign Legal Center filed an ethics complaint against Williams with the Office of Congressional Ethics, claiming that Williams appeared to have violated the Stop Trading on Congressional Knowledge (STOCK) Act of 2012, a federal transparency and conflict-of-interest law, by failing to properly disclose sales of stock in General Electric, Nvidia, and The Walt Disney Co. worth between $3,003 and $45,000 made by his wife in 2019.

=== Committee assignments ===
- Committee on Small Business Chairman
- Committee on Financial Services

=== Caucus membership ===
- Republican Study Committee

== Personal life ==
Williams and his wife Patty live in Weatherford, the seat of Parker County, and have two daughters. He married Patty Jung in 1983 and remained married until her death on January 17, 2025.

He owns an automobile dealership in Weatherford that he inherited. With a net worth of $27.7 million, Williams was listed as the 22nd wealthiest member of Congress in 2018.

Williams is a trustee of TCU and the George Bush School of Government and Public Service at Texas A&M University in College Station.

Williams is the coach of the Republican team for the Congressional Baseball Game. On June 14, 2017, he was present during a shooting attack on a practice for the game. He was taken from the area on a stretcher due to an ankle injury he suffered while jumping into the dugout during the attack. A member of his staff was shot and taken to the hospital, where he was treated for a leg injury and released.

Williams has shaken the hand of every president since Harry S. Truman.

Williams is Protestant.

Political offices
Preceded by Geoff Connor	Secretary of State of Texas; 2005–2007	Succeeded by Phil Wilson
U.S. House of Representatives
Preceded by Lloyd Doggett	Member of the U.S. House of Representatives from Texas's 25th congressional district 2013–present	Incumbent
Preceded by Nydia Velázquez	Chair of the House Small Business Committee; 2023–present	Incumbent
U.S. order of precedence (ceremonial)
Preceded by Randy Weber	United States representatives by seniority 118th	Succeeded by Robin Kelly
