= Texas Workforce Commission =

Agency of the Texas state government

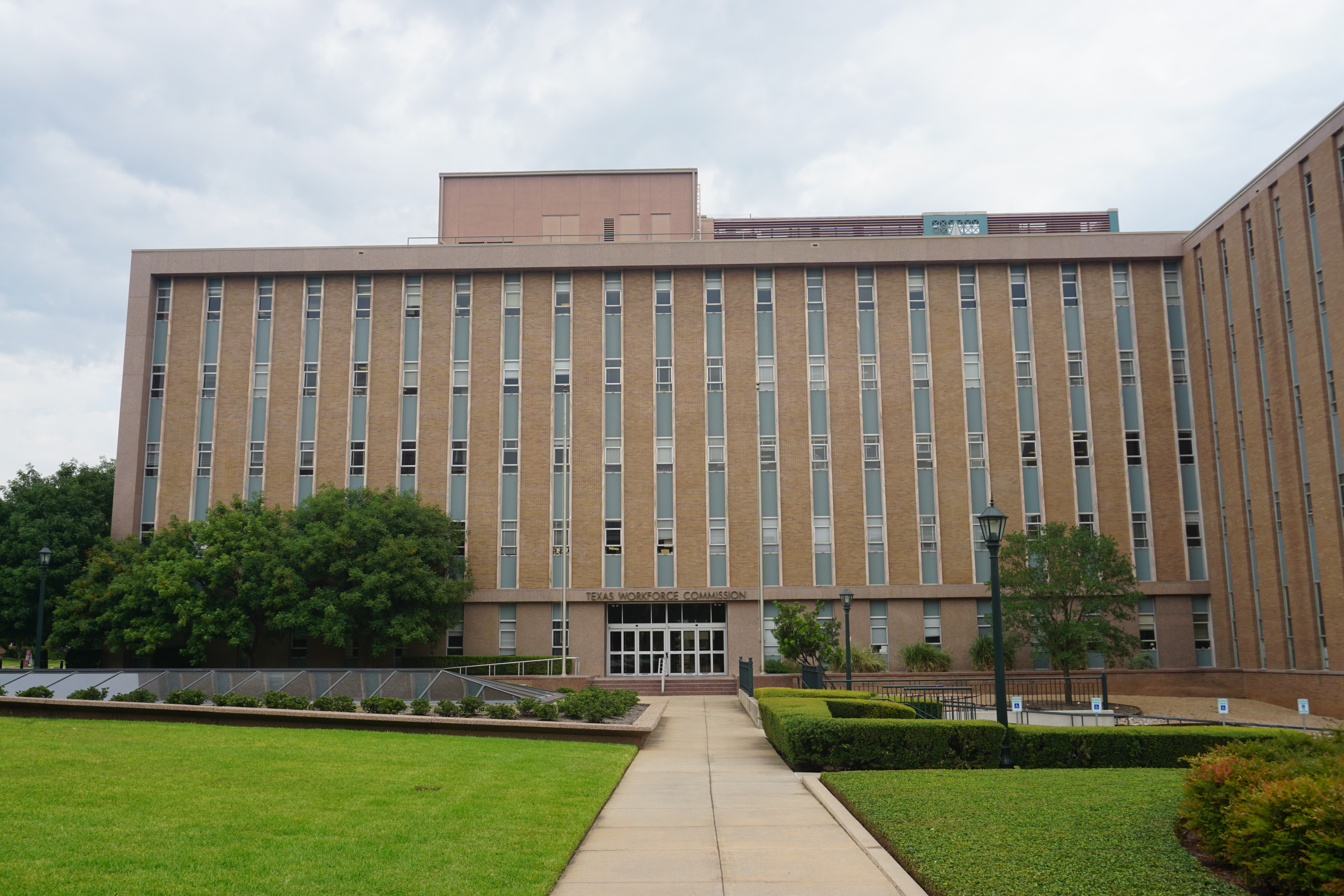
Texas Workforce Commission headquarters

The Texas Workforce Commission (TWC) is a governmental agency in the U.S. state of Texas that provides unemployment benefits and services related to employment to eligible individuals and businesses.

For employers, TWC offers recruiting, retention, training and retraining, and outplacement services, as well as information on labor law and unemployment insurance, tax-saving programs, and labor market planning. For job seekers, TWC offers career development information, job search resources (including an online job-matching system, workintexas.com), and training programs, and administers the unemployment benefits program. One large program, the Skills Development Fund, is Texas' job–training program providing training money for Texas businesses to help workers learn new skills and upgrade existing skills.

TWC also administers the Texas Payday Law, Texas Child Labor Law, and Child Care Services. TWC works with 28 Local Workforce Development Boards to provide employment assistance and promote self-sufficiency for customers. The boards oversee the delivery of child-care services, employment and training programs for welfare recipients, and planning employment services in their area's Texas Workforce Centers. They also direct the services called for under the Workforce Investment Act. The agency is headquartered in Downtown Austin.

TWC is responsible for administering the Texas Commission on Human Rights Act (TCHRA) to investigate and regulate unlawful forms of discrimination in employment in the state of Texas. The TCHRA is codified in chapter 21 of the Texas Labor Code, although it is commonly still referred to as the TCHRA. The TCHRA/chapter 21 of the Texas Labor Code empowers the TWC similar to the federal Equal Employment Opportunity Commission with analogous responsibilities at the state level.

In 2016, several vocational rehabilitation services provided through the Department of Assistive and Rehabilitation Services (DARS) were transferred. These included:

- The vocational rehabilitation program for individuals with visual impairments, including the Criss Cole Rehabilitation Center
- The vocational rehabilitation program for individuals with other disabilities
- The Business Enterprises of Texas program
- The Independent Living Services program for older individuals who are blind.

House Bill 1247 passed during the 87th Texas Legislature’s Regular Session in 2021, created the Tri-Agency Commission, a partnership between TWC, the Texas Education Agency, and Texas Higher Education Coordinating Board.

== Incidents ==
In 2018, the Coalition of Texans with Disabilities threatened to sue because TWC staff were not offering to help Texans with disabilities receiving VR services register to vote or updating voter registration information under the 1993 National Voter Registration Act. This service had previously been provided by DARS. TWC Staff later agreed to provide the services in a letter signed by the Texas Secretary of State.

In 2013, a Fort Worth TWC employee was sentenced to six years in federal prison for identity theft and mail fraud. Deshon Haynes diverted unemployment insurance of deceased individuals and at least five other claimants. Haynes was also required to pay full restitution.

In 2011, the comptroller was involved in a data breach exposing personal information of 3.5 million Texans. Encryption procedures to conceal Social Security numbers, names, addresses, and other identifying material had not been used. Some data exposed by the Comptroller were data they had received from the TWC. The Texas attorney general and the FBI reviewed security procedures.
