= Nate Schatzline =

American politician

Senior Advisor to the Governor of Texas
- Incumbent
- Assumed office July 2, 2026 Serving with Steve Munisteri
- Governor: Greg Abbott
- Preceded by: Robert Howden

Member of the Texas House of Representatives from the 93rd district
- In office January 10, 2023 – July 2, 2026
- Preceded by: Matt Krause
- Succeeded by: Ericka Lomick (elect)

Personal details
- Born: November 19, 1991 (age 34)
- Party: Republican
- Spouse: Adrienne
- Children: 3
- Education: Southwestern Assemblies of God University (BA); Liberty University (MA)

Nathaniel Schatzline (born November 19, 1991) is an American politician and pastor serving as the senior advisor to the Governor of Texas since 2026. A member of the Republican Party, he served in the Texas House of Representatives from 2023 to 2026.

== Early life and career ==
Schatzline's parents, Karen and Patrick Schatzline, co-founded the evangelist organization Remnant Ministries International. He graduated from the Southwestern Assemblies of God University with a Bachelor of Arts and from Liberty University with a Master of Arts in political science.

Schatzline worked as a pastor at a church in Modesto, California. He was an adjunct professor at SEU-NorCal, a satellite campus in Modesto of Southeastern University, lecturing microeconomics classes in a megachurch in 2019. He moved to Fort Worth in June 2020.

He is the director of operations of The Justice Reform, an anti-human trafficking nonprofit that operates under Mercy Culture Church in Fort Worth.

== Political career ==
=== Texas House of Representatives ===
A Republican, Schatzline was elected during the 2022 Texas House of Representatives election, defeating Democrat KC Chowdhury in District 93. He campaigned on Christian conservative values, and supported securing the Mexican border, law enforcement, and lowering taxes. Schatzline supports the Constitutional right to keep and bear arms, and restrictions on abortion, with exceptions when the mother's life is at risk. He has decried the entirety of Islam as dangerous to Texas, and framed Islam as a political ideology as opposed to an actual religion. He opposes critical race theory. Schatzline currently served on the corrections and human services committee.

In February 2023, Schatzline authored bill HB 1266 to restrict drag performances by amending the Texas business and commerce code. A month later, NBC News reported on a video showing Schatzline had previously dressed in women's clothing and performed for a school theatre project.

On May 27, 2023, Schatzline voted against the impeachment of Texas Attorney General Ken Paxton.

In 2025, Schatzline authored a bill to make bookstores liable for selling books that contain obscene content.

Schatzline announced he would not seek re-election to a third term in 2026, instead joining the National Faith Advisory Board, which works with the White House under Donald Trump. Fort Worth city councilman Alan Blaylock won the Republican nomination to succeed Schatzline.

He resigned from the chamber in July 2026 after being appointed a senior advisor on election integrity to governor Greg Abbott. Although reported that Schatzline was a frontrunner to be nominated Secretary of State of Texas, Abbott ultimately appointed his legislative director Robert Howden after incumbent secretary of state Jane Nelson reportedly pushed against Schatzline's appointment.
