= Matt Krause =

American attorney & politician (born 1980)

Tarrant County Commissioner Precinct 3
- Incumbent
- Assumed office January 1, 2025
- Preceded by: Gary Fickes

Member of the Texas House of Representatives from the 93rd district
- In office January 8, 2013 – January 10, 2023
- Preceded by: Barbara Nash
- Succeeded by: Nate Schatzline

Personal details
- Born: Matthew Haston Krause; August 19, 1980 (age 45) Tyler, Texas, U.S.
- Party: Republican
- Spouse: Jennie
- Children: 5
- Education: San Diego Christian College (BA); Liberty University (JD)
- Website: Office website Campaign website

Matthew Haston Krause (born August 19, 1980) is an American attorney and politician serving as a member of the Tarrant County Commissioners Court since 2025. A member of the Republican Party, he served as a member of the Texas House of Representatives from 2013 to 2023.

== Early life and education ==
Krause was born in Tyler, Texas, and raised in San Antonio. He earned a Bachelor of Arts degree in history and social sciences from San Diego Christian College and a Juris Doctor from the Liberty University School of Law in 2007.

== Career ==
From 2007 to 2012, Krause worked as an attorney for Liberty Counsel. Since December 2017, Krause has also worked as a business development officer for Vista Bank.

=== Texas House of Representatives ===
He was elected to the Texas House of Representatives from District 93 in November 2012 and assumed office in 2013. He was reelected to four additional terms. Throughout his tenure in the House, Krause has been ranked one of the most conservative members of the Texas Legislature. In the 2021–2022 legislative session, Krause was chair of the House General Investigating Committee. In 2017, Krause was one of the dozen Republicans who founded the Texas Freedom Caucus, a group of hardline conservatives modeled after the Freedom Caucus.

Krause is among the most avid anti-abortion members of the Texas Legislature. In 2015, Krause sponsored legislation to make it more difficult for pregnant teens to obtain abortions using the judicial bypass procedure. In 2015, following the death of Marlise Muñoz, Krause introduced legislation that would require Texas hospitals to keep brain-dead pregnant women on life support, and appoint legal counsel for the fetus to represent the fetus in court. In 2019, after a spate of mass shootings in Texas, Krause said that he would support Democratic members' calls for a special session on gun violence only if anti-abortion legislation was also on the agenda. Krause sponsored the House version of Senate Bill 8, which passed and enacted the Texas Heartbeat Act. The Act protected fetuses at around six weeks gestation from abortion on demand. This was later challenged in the courts.

In 2017, Krause proposed legislation to end no-fault divorce in Texas and to require couples to live separately for three years before obtaining a divorce, except in cases of abuse, adultery, or other issues.

In 2019, despite a recent measles outbreak, Krause introduced a bill to make it easier for parents to opt their children out of school vaccination requirements.

In 2019, Krause was one of 13 House Republicans who joined Democrats to pass a bill, 77–66, to make defendants with severe mental illness ineligible for the death penalty. Later that year, Krause was part of a bipartisan group of Texas legislators who urged a delay in the execution of Rodney Reed, a Texas death-row inmate, over questions about Reed's guilt.

In August 2021, after Texas House Democrats left the state to prevent Republicans from obtaining a quorum to pass legislation to restrict voting Krause voted in favor of a Republican measure to issue civil arrest warrants to compel the missing members to return to the Capitol to appear for the special session.

In October 2021, Krause, as chair of the House Committee on General Investigating, launched an investigation into Texas school boards, asking them whether a list of 850 books on subjects of race and sexuality were in Texas libraries and classrooms. The list included Pulitzer Prize-winning novels, best sellers, and other award-winning works of literature, many of them written by women, people of color, or LGBTQ authors. This list included William Styron's The Confessions of Nat Turner, Ta-Nehisi Coates's Between the World and Me, and Isabel Wilkerson's Caste: The Origins of Our Discontents. The Texas State Teachers Association described Krause's investigation as a politically motivated "witch hunt" and Texas Democrats denounced it. Krause refused to explain how the list of 850 books was created, which school districts received the letter, or why he was seeking this information. Seven Texas school districts confirmed receiving the letter from Krause, and several indicated that they would decline to respond.

=== 2022 Texas attorney general election ===
In September 2021, Krause announced a challenge to incumbent Texas Attorney General Ken Paxton in the 2022 Republican primary. Though previously a long-time ally of Paxton, Krause has alleged that Paxton is "distracted" and unable to pay sufficient attention to his role as Attorney General, in light of a pending criminal case against him and allegations by former staff members that Paxton abused his office to benefit a campaign contributor. Krause was the third major challenger to announce against Paxton, following George P. Bush and Eva Guzman in summer 2021. Krause has said that his decision to run was triggered by the inability of Bush and Guzman to build a strong connection with rank-and-file conservatives in Texas.

In November 2021, Krause dropped out of the election and instead announced he would run for Tarrant County District Attorney. He endorsed U.S. Representative Louie Gohmert for Attorney General.

=== Tarrant County Commissioner ===
In November 2024, Krause was elected to the Tarrant County Commissioners Court for Precinct 3.

Texas House of Representatives
Preceded by Barbara Nash	Member of the Texas House of Representatives from the 93rd district 2013–2023	Succeeded by Nate Schatzline
