= Ericka Lomick =

American politician

Member-elect of the Texas House of Representatives from the 93rd district
- Assuming office January 2027
- Succeeding: Nate Schatzline

Personal details
- Born: 1975 or 1976 (age 50–51)
- Party: Democratic
- Education: Kaplan University (attended); University of Texas at Austin School of Law (attended)
- Website: Campaign website (Archived 2026-03-23 at the Wayback Machine)

Ericka L. Lomick (also known as Ericka L. Flood; born 1975/1976) is an American politician. A member of the Democratic Party, she is the member-elect for the 93rd district of the Texas House of Representatives.

== Background ==
In June 2010, Lomick was one of ten people charged with various criminal counts including mortgage fraud conspiracy and bank bribery conspiracy by the Federal Bureau of Investigation as part of 'Operation Stolen Dreams' into a mortgage fraud ring operating from around September 2006 to January 2008 in North Carolina. Her alleged role was as a promoter and mortgage broker in the scheme, leading to being charged with one count alleging mortgage fraud conspiracy; four counts alleging bank fraud; one count alleging money laundering conspiracy; and two counts alleging concealment money laundering. As of July 2010, she was released on bond on the condition that she not be employed in banking, financial services, or the mortgage industry. In 2011, she pled guilty to mortgage fraud, bank fraud and conspiracy to commit money laundering for 63 months prison time and a $300,000 restitution.

Lomick attended Kaplan University and was pursuing a Juris Doctor at the University of Texas at Austin School of Law and working as a senior operations analyst at Walmart as of October 4, 2026.

== Texas House of Representatives ==
Despite suspending her campaign weeks before the general election after a conservative organization learned of her previous felony conviction, Lomick defeated Republican nominee and Fort Worth city councilor Alan Blaylock in the general election. Following the election, Lomick stated she was qualified to serve in the Texas House of Representatives which Blaylock challenged in a letter asking Texas Secretary of State Robert Howden to declare her ineligible to serve.
