= Kenneth Williams Kohler =

American politician (1930–2011)

Member of the Texas House of Representatives from the 93rd district
- In office November 27, 1961 – January 8, 1963
- Preceded by: J. Edgar Wilson
- Succeeded by: Walter Lee Knapp

Personal details
- Born: August 20, 1930 Amarillo, Texas, U.S.
- Died: July 5, 2011 (aged 80) Amarillo, Texas, U.S.
- Party: Republican
- Education: Amarillo College; Colorado College

Kenneth Williams Kohler (August 20, 1930 – July 5, 2011) was an American politician who served in the Texas House of Representatives from 1961 to 1963. He is notable for being the first Republican from the Panhandle elected to the Texas Legislature.

Kohler was born on August 20, 1930, in Amarillo, Texas. He attended Amarillo High School. He later attended Amarillo College and Colorado College.

On November 19, 1961, he was elected in a special election to fill the vacancy left by the death of James Edgar Wilson. He was sworn in and took office on November 27, 1961. At the time, he and George F. Korkmas of Galveston were the only two Republicans in the 150-member Texas House of Representatives. He served on the House Taxation and Revenue Committee. In 1962, he ran for reelection, but was defeated.

He died on July 5, 2011, in Amarillo, aged 80.
