= Vista Bank =

Vista Bank may refer to:

- Vista Bank (Dallas), a bank in the United States
- Vista Bank (Africa), a multinational banking group
- Vista Bank (Romania), a bank in Romania
