= Brent Webster =

American lawyer and politician

Acting Attorney General of Texas
- In office May 27, 2023 – May 31, 2023; Served during Ken Paxton's suspension
- Governor: Greg Abbott
- Preceded by: Ken Paxton
- Succeeded by: John Scott (interim)

Personal details
- Born: Texas, U.S.
- Party: Republican
- Education: Southwestern University (BA); University of Houston (JD)

Brent Webster is an American lawyer serving as the first assistant attorney general of Texas since 2020. In May 2023, he performed the duties of state attorney general for three days following Ken Paxton's impeachment and suspension from office.

== Early life and education ==
Webster is originally from Houston, Texas and graduated from Cypress Falls High School. Webster earned a Bachelor of Arts in political science and government from Southwestern University. Webster holds a Juris Doctor degree from the University of Houston Law Center.

== Early legal career ==
In his early career, Webster was a prosecutor in the Williamson County, Texas district attorney (DA)'s office, where he ultimately became first assistant district attorney.

After departing the Williamson County DA's office, Webster became chief operating officer of Just One Dime. He also joined Edwards Sutarwalla PLLC, a Houston-based law firm, as a senior counsel.

== Career in Texas AG's Office ==
=== First Assistant Attorney General of Texas ===
Following the sudden resignation of Jeff Mateer as First Assistant Attorney General of Texas in October 2020, Texas Attorney General Ken Paxton appointed Webster to the Office of Attorney General's second-in-command position. Mateer resigned after becoming one of eight attorneys in the Office of the Attorney General to report Paxton to law enforcement, accusing him of abuse of power and accepting bribes; the complaint triggered an FBI investigation. Mateer and the others raised concerns over Paxton's personal involvement in a federal case against real estate developer and Paxton campaign donor Nate Paul. Paxton fired the other whistleblowers and replaced them with new senior staff, including Webster.

As Paxton's top deputy, Webster was involved in many of Paxton's legal challenges. His annual salary of $275,000 made him the highest-paid employee of the AG's office, with pay higher than the elected attorney general.

=== Attempt to overturn 2020 presidential election ===
In late 2020, Webster took part in Paxton's effort to try to overturn the results of the November 2020 presidential election, in which Joe Biden defeated Donald Trump. In December 2020, Webster filed a case on behalf of the state (Texas v. Pennsylvania) that sought to overturn the election results in four states won by Biden, thus overturning Trump's election loss and keeping him in power. Texas's complaint contained many debunked claims of voter fraud that had already been rejected by many other courts.

==== Proceedings against Webster for professional misconduct ====
The State Bar of Texas subsequently investigated and brought a disciplinary case against Webster. In January 2022, the Commission for Lawyer Discipline held a hearing, at which Webster refused to appear. In May 2022, following its investigation, the Commission determined that Webster violated the state's Rules of Professional Conduct for attorneys "by engaging in conduct involving dishonesty, fraud, deceit or misrepresentation"; and identified six key misrepresentations that Webster had made in the Texas v. Pennsylvania filings before the Supreme Court.

After the Commission made adverse findings against him, Webster chose to file an appeal in court rather than accept the sanctions proposed by the panel. In September 2022, Judge John Youngblood, a Milam County judge assigned to the case in Williamson County court, dismissed the case against Webster, ruling that "the separation-of-powers doctrine deprives this Court of subject-matter jurisdiction" because the State Bar (part of the judicial branch) would sanction the attorney general's office (part of the executive branch). Youngblood's ruling was reversed by the Texas Eighth Court of Appeals in El Paso, which ruled in June 2022 that lawyers for the state are not immune from the rules of professional conduct governing lawyers. The court wrote that "Immunizing Webster from professional-misconduct proceedings in no way furthers the rationale for sovereign immunity" and that Webster's argument, if accepted, would make the public "powerless to deter misconduct."

=== Three-day tenure as acting attorney general ===
Webster began performing the duties of state attorney general after the Texas House of Representatives impeached Paxton on May 27, 2023, automatically suspending Paxton from exercising the powers of the office pending his trial in the Texas Senate. (Note: Under Texas law, if the state attorney general is "absent or unable to act" the First Assistant Attorney General becomes acting attorney general until the governor appoints an interim replacement.)

On May 31, 2023, Governor Greg Abbott appointed lawyer and lobbyist John B. Scott as interim attorney general for the remainder of Paxton's suspension. Scott was Texas Secretary of State from October 2021 to December 2022, and briefly was an attorney for former President Trump.

== Election history ==
Texas Court of Criminal Appeals, Place 5, Republican Primary, 2016
Party	Candidate	Votes	%
Republican	Scott Walker	833,757	41.48
Republican	Brent Webster	411,119	20.45
Republican	Steve Smith	393,992	19.60
Republican	Sid Harle	371,303	18.47
Total votes		2,010,171	100.0

Texas Court of Criminal Appeals, Place 5, Republican Primary runoff, 2016
Party	Candidate	Votes	%
Republican	Scott Walker	206,922	58.02
Republican	Brent Webster	149,714	41.98
Total votes		356,636	100.0

== Notes ==
Legal offices
Preceded by Ken Paxton	Attorney General of Texas; Acting; 2023	Succeeded by John Scott; Interim
