= Angela Colmenero =

American judge (born 1979)

Angela Veronica Colmenero

Judge of the United States District Court for the Southern District of Texas
- Incumbent
- Assumed office October 22, 2026
- Appointed by: Donald Trump
- Preceded by: Lee H. Rosenthal

Interim Attorney General of Texas
- In office July 14, 2023 – September 16, 2023; Served during Ken Paxton's suspension
- Governor: Greg Abbott
- Preceded by: John Scott (interim)
- Succeeded by: Ken Paxton

Personal details
- Born: Angela Veronica Colmenero; 1979 (age 46–47) Austin, Texas, U.S.
- Party: Republican
- Education: University of Texas at Austin (BA); University of Notre Dame (JD)

Angela Veronica Colmenero (born 1979) is an American judge who serves as a United States district judge of the United States District Court for the Southern District of Texas. She served as the interim Texas Attorney General from July 14 to September 16, 2023. She is the deputy chief of staff to Governor Greg Abbott and previously served as his principal deputy general counsel from 2021 to 2023.

== Education ==
Colmenero is Hispanic-American and was born in 1979 in Austin, Texas. She graduated from the University of Texas at Austin in 2001 with a Bachelor of Arts degree. She received a Juris Doctor from the Notre Dame Law School in 2004.

== Career ==
Colmenero worked in the office of the Texas Attorney General for almost ten years where she held a number of positions including chief of the general litigation division and deputy chief of the special litigation division. In September 2018, she joined the Office of the Governor of Texas as a deputy general counsel. In November 2021, she was promoted by Texas Governor Greg Abbott to principal deputy general counsel. Colmenero was promoted to deputy chief of staff to the governor in June 2023. On July 14, 2023, Colmenero succeeded John B. Scott as the new interim Texas Attorney General.

=== Federal judicial service ===
On May 11, 2026, President Donald Trump announced his intention to nominate Colmenero to an undesignated seat on the United States District Court for the Southern District of Texas. On May 12, 2026, Trump nominated her to the seat vacated by Judge Lee H. Rosenthal. On July 16, 2026, her nomination was reported to the Senate by a 11-10 party-line vote. On September 23, 2026, her nomination was confirmed by a 50–47 vote. She received her judicial commission on October 22, 2026.

== See also ==
- List of female state attorneys general in the United States
- List of Hispanic and Latino American jurists
- List of minority attorneys general in the United States

Legal offices
Preceded by John Scott; Interim	Attorney General of Texas; Interim; 2023	Succeeded by Ken Paxton
Preceded by Lee H. Rosenthal	Judge of the United States District Court for the Southern District of Texas; 2026–present	Incumbent
