= Ruth R. Hughs =

American lawyer and politician

Ruth Hughs

113th Secretary of State of Texas
- In office August 19, 2019 – May 31, 2021
- Governor: Greg Abbott
- Preceded by: David Whitley
- Succeeded by: John B. Scott

Personal details
- Born: 1971 or 1972 (age 54–55)
- Party: Republican
- Education: University of Texas, Austin (BA); Rutgers University, Camden (JD)

Ruth Ruggero Hughs (born 1971/1972) is an American lawyer who served as the 113th Texas Secretary of State, appointed by Governor Greg Abbott on August 19, 2019.

In July 2015 Governor Abbott appointed Hughs to the three-member Texas Workforce Commission (TWC). Hughs became Chair of the TWC in August 2018.

Prior to her appointment as a TWC commissioner, Hughs was in private law practice and was the owner of a film production company. Before her work in the private sector, Hughs served as the Director of Defense Litigation in the Texas Attorney General's Office where she managed six civil litigation divisions, advising on state, federal, and local matters.

Hughs is a native of Argentina and is a member of the Republican Party. She is a member of the State Bar of Texas and the New Jersey State Bar and chair of the Advisory Council on Cultural Affairs. Hughs is a graduate of The University of Texas at Austin and received a Juris Doctor degree from Rutgers Camden School of Law.

On May 31, 2021, Hughs resigned as Secretary of State after the Texas State Senate Nominations Committee did not take up her nomination for another term.

Hughs resides with her husband Greg and their two children in Austin.

Political offices
Preceded by Joe Esparza; Acting	Secretary of State of Texas; 2019–2021	Succeeded by Joe Esparza; Acting
