= Scott Sanford =

Texas legislator

Member of the Texas House of Representatives from the 70th district
- In office January 8, 2013 – January 10, 2023
- Preceded by: Ken Paxton
- Succeeded by: Mihaela Plesa

Personal details
- Born: October 3, 1963 (age 63)
- Party: Republican
- Spouse: Shelly Parks
- Children: 2
- Education: Baylor University (BBA, MTax)
- Occupation: Accountant, pastor
- Website: http://scottsanford.us/

William Scott Sanford (born October 3, 1957) is an American minister and politician. He has represented the 70th District in the Texas House of Representatives from 2013 to 2023. A member of the Republican Party, Sanford also serves as the executive pastor for stewardship and operations of the Cottonwood Creek Church in Allen, Texas.

== Tenure ==
Sanford sponsored and introduced a House bill that would protect churches from litigation arising from their reporting of sexual abuse by those who would otherwise possibly be employed by churches and similar organizations. Sanford, who also serves as the executive pastor at the multi-campus Cottonwood Creek Church in Allen, Texas, recently filed a bill to give immunity from civil liability to churches or other non-profits that in good faith report allegations of prior sexual abuse to an individual's current or prospective employer. "Sexual abuse thrives in secrecy," Sanford said. His bill established protections for reporting, to enable victims to come forward and facilitate the ability of charitable organizations to end the silence that has enhanced the ability of predators to move between such organizations. In February 2019, the Houston Chronicle and the San Antonio Express-News documented 380 Southern Baptist church leaders and volunteers accused of sexual misconduct in the prior two decades and more than 700 victims of such abuse." The bill was signed into law.

Texas House of Representatives
| Preceded by Ken Paxton | Member of the Texas House of Representatives from the 70th district 2013–2023 | Succeeded by Mihaela Plesa |
