= John B. Scott (Texas politician) =

American politician

Interim Attorney General of Texas
- In office May 31, 2023 – July 14, 2023; Served during Ken Paxton's suspension
- Governor: Greg Abbott
- Preceded by: Brent Webster (acting)
- Succeeded by: Angela Colmenero (interim)

114th Secretary of State of Texas
- In office October 21, 2021 – December 31, 2022
- Governor: Greg Abbott
- Preceded by: Ruth R. Hughs; Joe Esparza (acting)
- Succeeded by: Jane Nelson

Personal details
- Party: Republican
- Education: University of Texas, Austin (BA); South Texas College of Law Houston (JD)

John B. Scott is an American politician and lawyer. A member of the Republican Party, he was Secretary of State of Texas from 2021 to 2022, and was interim Texas attorney general for a brief period in 2023. Governor Greg Abbott appointed Scott to both positions.

== Career ==
He earned a Bachelor of Arts at the University of Texas at Austin and his Juris Doctor from South Texas College of Law Houston.

Scott was the deputy attorney general for civil litigation in the Texas Attorney General's Office, under then-Attorney General Greg Abbott. He later became chief operating officer for the Texas Health and Human Services Commission.

After the 2020 presidential election, Scott briefly represented Donald Trump in one of his many failed lawsuits that attempted to overturn the election results and keep Trump in power; the lawsuit in which Scott represented Trump specifically sought to nullify the election result in Pennsylvania, where Joe Biden defeated Trump.

In May 2021, Ruth Ruggero Hughs resigned as Secretary of State of Texas. On October 21, 2021, Governor Abbott appointed Scott, a member of the Republican Party, as interim secretary of state. Like Abbott's three previous nominees as secretary of state, Scott was not confirmed by the Texas Senate (his successor, Jane Nelson, was confirmed by the Senate). In early December 2022, Scott said he would resign as secretary of state at the end of the year, and his resignation took effect on December 31, 2022.

After stepping down as secretary of state, Scott worked as a lobbyist during the 2023 session of the Texas Legislature. His clients included South Texas College; the Human Coalition, an anti-abortion group; a blockchain firm based in New York; and a subsidiary of HealthPlan.

On May 31, 2023, after state Attorney General Ken Paxton was automatically suspended from office upon his impeachment by the Texas House of Representatives, Abbott appointed Scott as the interim Attorney General for the period of Paxton's suspension. Scott resigned on July 14, 2023, and was replaced as interim AG by Angela Colmenero, a lawyer and Abbott's deputy chief of staff.

Political offices
Preceded by Joe Esparza; Acting	Secretary of State of Texas; 2021–2022	Succeeded by Jane Nelson
Legal offices
Preceded by Brent Webster; Acting	Attorney General of Texas; Interim; 2023	Succeeded by Angela Colmenero; Interim
