= Lana Myers =

American judge

Lana Myers is a retired Justice of the Fifth Court of Appeals of Texas, Place 4 (2009–2022). She was appointed to this position in 2009 by Governor Rick Perry, was elected in 2010 and re-elected in 2016. Prior to her appointment, Myers had served as an elected Judge presiding over the Dallas County 203rd District Court from 1995 to 2009. She was a Dallas County Assistant District Attorney from 1982 to 1994 before her election to the district court bench. In 2023, Myers provided legal counsel to Lieutenant Governor Dan Patrick, who presided over the Impeachment Tribunal of Attorney General Ken Paxton.

== STAR Court initiative ==
"In addition to her regular docket, Judge Myers has served the community through her involvement in administering and judging the Texas and National High School Mock Trial Competitions. She has also received special recognition for her work in presiding over STAR Court (an acronym for "Strengthening Transition And Recovery"), an innovative specialty court designed to reduce recidivism among female offenders charged with felony prostitution."

Myers was interviewed by The Atlantic, to discuss the STAR court initiative and her experience with the program.
