= Lee H. Rosenthal =

American judge (born 1952)

Lee Hyman Rosenthal
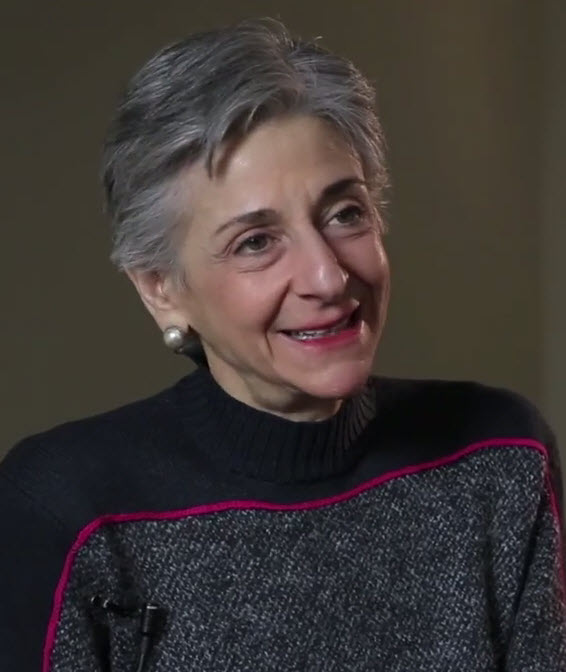

Senior Judge of the United States District Court for the Southern District of Texas
- Incumbent
- Assumed office December 1, 2024

Chief Judge of the United States District Court for the Southern District of Texas
- In office November 13, 2016 – November 29, 2022
- Preceded by: Ricardo Hinojosa
- Succeeded by: Randy Crane

Judge of the United States District Court for the Southern District of Texas
- In office May 13, 1992 – December 1, 2024
- Appointed by: George H. W. Bush
- Preceded by: Seat established by 104 Stat. 5089
- Succeeded by: Angela Colmenero

Personal details
- Born: November 30, 1952 (age 73) Richmond, Indiana, U.S.
- Education: University of Chicago (BA, JD)

Lee Hyman Rosenthal (born November 30, 1952) is a senior United States district judge of the United States District Court for the Southern District of Texas.

== Education and early life ==
Born to a Jewish father, Rosenthal received her Bachelor of Arts degree from the University of Chicago in 1974 and her J.D. degree from the University of Chicago Law School in 1977, where she was an editor of the Law Review.

== Career ==
After graduating from law school, Rosenthal completed a one-year clerkship with Chief Judge John Robert Brown of the United States Court of Appeals for the Fifth Circuit. Rosenthal practiced with the Houston law firm Baker Botts from 1978 to 1992, becoming a partner in 1985.

=== Federal judicial service ===
On March 20, 1992, Rosenthal was nominated by President George H. W. Bush to be a United States district judge of the United States District Court for the Southern District of Texas to a new seat authorized by 104 Stat. 5089. She was confirmed by the United States Senate on May 12, 1992, and received her commission on May 13, 1992. She became chief judge on November 13, 2016. and served until November 29, 2022, one day before she turned 70. She assumed senior status on December 1, 2024.

Rosenthal chaired the Judicial Conference Committee on Rules of Practice and Procedure, to which she was appointed in 2007 by Chief Justice John Roberts The committee supervises the rule-making process in the federal courts and oversees and coordinates the work of the Advisory Committees on the Federal Rules of Evidence and of Civil, Criminal, Bankruptcy and Appellate Procedure.

Prior to 2007, Rosenthal was a member, then chair, of the Judicial Conference Advisory Committee on the Federal Rules of Civil Procedure. Chief Justice William H. Rehnquist appointed her to that committee in 1996, and as chair in 2003. Under her tenure, the discovery rules were amended to address the impact of changes in information technology in 2006. In 2007, the entire set of civil rules was edited to be clearer and simpler without changing substantive meaning. The work clarifying and simplifying the rules used in the trial courts won the committee the 2007 "Reform in Law" Award from the Burton Awards for Legal Achievement, an award issued with the Library of Congress and the Law Library of Congress.

== Law reform ==
Rosenthal was elected to the American Law Institute (ALI) and in 2007 was elected to its council. She currently serves on ALI's executive committee as an adviser on four of ALI's projects: The Restatement of Employment Law; Privacy Law Principles; Aggregate Litigation; and Rules of Transnational Civil Procedure. She is a member of the board of editors for the Manual for Complex Litigation, published by the Federal Judicial Center.

Rosenthal is a member of the Rice University Board of Trustees and a member of the Duke University School of Law Board of Visitors. She is also an adjunct faculty at the University of Houston Law Center.

== Reputation ==
Rosenthal was selected as the trial judge of the year by the Texas Association of Civil Trial and Appellate Specialists in 2000 and again in 2006. She has received the Houston Bar Association's highest bar-poll evaluation for judges three times — in 1999, 2005 and 2007. In the 2007 poll, 80.5% of respondents rated her "outstanding" and 16.5% rated her "acceptable".

== See also ==
- List of Jewish American jurists
- List of United States federal judges by longevity of service

Legal offices
Preceded by Seat established by 104 Stat. 5089	Judge of the United States District Court for the Southern District of Texas; 1992–2024	Succeeded by Angela Colmenero
Preceded by Ricardo Hinojosa	Chief Judge of the United States District Court for the Southern District of Texas; 2016–2022	Succeeded by Randy Crane
