= Mihaela Plesa =

American politician (born 1983)

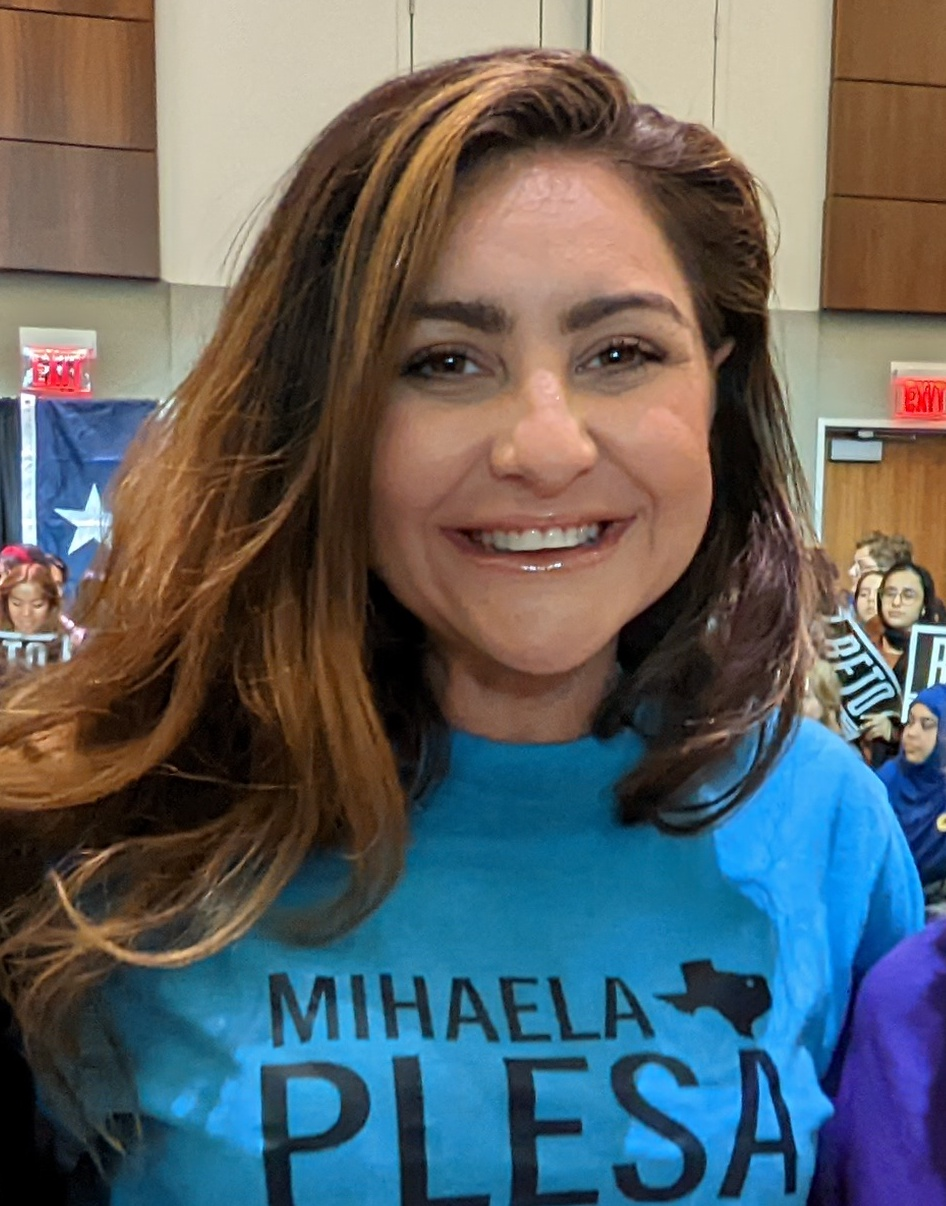
- Plesa in 2022

Member of the Texas House of Representatives from the 70th district
- Incumbent
- Assumed office January 10, 2023
- Preceded by: Scott Sanford

Personal details
- Born: July 28, 1983 (age 43) Dallas, Texas, U.S.
- Party: Democratic
- Education: University of North Texas; Southern Methodist University
- Website: Campaign website

Mihaela Elizabeth Plesa (born July 28, 1983) is an American politician who is the Representative for Texas's 70th House of Representatives district, following the 2022 Texas House of Representatives election. Her district covers parts of Collin County. She is a member of the Democratic Party.

== Early life and education ==
Plesa was born in Dallas, Texas, in a Romanian-American family. Plesa graduated from Newman Smith High School in Carrollton, Texas. She received a bachelor's degree from the University of North Texas in 2006 and a graduate degree from Southern Methodist University in 2012.

== Political career ==
Before running for office, Plesa served for four years as the legislative director for Ray Lopez, a Democrat from San Antonio.

Plesa ran for Texas's 70th House of Representatives district in 2022 as a Democrat. This district is based in Collin County and had been redrawn to be more favorable to Democrats, with the goal of making other seats in Collin County more safe for the Republican incumbents. Plesa narrowly defeated Republican Jamee Jolly.

== Electoral history ==
2022 Texas's 70th House of Representatives district election
Party	Candidate	Votes	%
Democratic	Mihaela Plesa	29,660	50.73
Republican	Jamee Jolly	28,801	49.27
Total votes		58,461	100.0

2024 Texas's 70th House of Representatives district election
Party	Candidate	Votes	%
Democratic	Mihaela Plesa	38,183	52.22
Republican	Steve Kinnard	34,933	47.78
Total votes		73,116	100.0
