= Texas's 70th House of Representatives district =

American legislative district

Texas's 70th State House of Representatives district
Representative
Mihaela Plesa; D–Plano
- Demographics: 45.9% White; 12.4% Black; 15.4% Hispanic; 24.8% Asian
- Population (2020) • Voting age: 185,574; 146,914

The 70th district of the Texas House of Representatives contains parts of southern Collin County. The current representative is Mihaela Plesa, who was elected in 2022.

== Recent election results from statewide races ==
Year	Office	Results
2008	President	McCain 58.0 - 41.7%
2012	President	Romney 60.3 - 39.7%
2016	President	Trump 47.8 - 46.0%
2018	Governor	Abbott 52.5 - 45.5%
2018	Senate	O'Rourke 53.5% - 45.7%
2020	President	Biden 54.7 - 43.6%
2020	Senate	Hegar 50.2% - 47.5%
2022	Governor	O'Rourke 52.8 - 45.9%
