= Texas's 93rd House of Representatives district =

Electoral district of Texas

Texas's 93rd State House of Representatives district
- Representative: Vacant

District 93 is a district in the Texas House of Representatives. It was represented by Republican Nate Schatzline from 2023 to 2026.

== Geography ==
The district contains parts of the Tarrant County.

== Members ==
=== 20th century ===
- J. Edgar Wilson (until 1961)
- Kenneth Williams Kohler (1961–1963)

=== 21st century ===
- Paula Pierson (2007–2010)
- Barbara Nash (2011–2013)
- Matt Krause (2013–2023)
- Nate Schatzline (since 2023)
