= Nate Paul =

U.S. real estate developer

Natin "Nate" Paul
- Born: Natin Paul; 1987 (age 38–39); Victoria, Texas, United States
- Occupation: Businessman
- Known for: Convicted felon in relation to false documents that resulted in impeachment of Texas Attorney General Ken Paxton

Natin "Nate" Paul (born 1987 in Victoria, Texas) is an American real estate developer and convicted felon. He founded the real estate firm World Class Capital Group.

Paul is at the center of the abuse-of-office complaints that ultimately led to the 2023 impeachment and temporary suspension of Attorney General of Texas Ken Paxton. Six of the 20 articles of impeachment against Paxton in 2023 mention Paul by name. In January 2025, Paul pleaded guilty to and was convicted of one count of making a false statement to a financial institution. He was sentenced to four months of home confinement, five years of supervised release, and a $1 million fine. He completed the home confinement portion of his sentence on August 20, 2025.

== Early life and career ==
Paul was raised in Victoria, Texas, by parents who immigrated from India. Using a $6,000 loan from his father, he founded his first business, a DJ company, at the age of 9. In 2002, at age 15, he moved to Austin to attend St. Michael's Catholic Academy. He subsequently enrolled at the University of Texas at Austin.

In 2006, he founded real estate development firm World Class Capital Group. In 2007, he bought his first apartment building, flipped it three months later, and used the profits to purchase five more buildings; in 2008, he dropped out of university to run his business full time. In 2010, he began making political donations.

In November 2016 Paul was listed on Forbes 30 Under 30, a pick the publication regretted seven years later, placing Paul on its Hall of Shame, featuring ten picks it wished it could take back.

== Legal issues ==
=== Role in impeachment of Ken Paxton ===
In 2019, the FBI and Department of the Treasury raided Paul's home and business. Before the raid, in October 2018, Paul made a $25,000 donation to Texas Attorney General Ken Paxton. Following the donation, Paxton was the subject of whistleblower complaints from his aides that he used his office to help Paul's business interests and intervened on Paul's behalf. Six of the 20 articles of impeachment against Paxton in 2023 mention Paul by name.

=== Other legal issues ===
In 2022, former professional basketball player Avery Bradley sued Paul for $8M, claiming that Paul had mismanaged Bradley's $6.75M investment.

In March 2023, Paul was sentenced to 10 days in jail for contempt of court and fined $180,000 for lying in district court about money transfers in violation of a court order. The Supreme Court of Texas stayed the sentence pending appeal.

On June 8, 2023, Paul was arrested and booked into the Austin jail on a warrant issued by the FBI. According to the New York Times, "Paul lied about his liabilities, his liquidity and the balance in his bank accounts, and that he falsified documents to obtain millions of dollars in loans that he would have otherwise been unable to obtain." Paul was found guilty of criminal contempt of court for perjury and defying an injunction in a civil litigation case. He served a 10-day jail sentence for this charge in November 2024 after his legal appeals failed.

In January 2025, Paul pleaded guilty to and was convicted of one count of making a false statement to a financial institution. He was services to four months of home confinement, five years of supervised release, and a $1 million fine. He completed the home confinement portion of his sentence on August 20, 2025.
