= George F. Korkmas =

American politician (born 1931)

Member of the Texas House of Representatives from the 21-2 district
- In office December 18, 1961 – January 8, 1963
- Preceded by: Peter J. La Valle

Personal details
- Born: August 2, 1931 Tyler, Texas, U.S.
- Party: Republican
- Spouse: Theresa Eltife (m. 1952; died 2019)
- Education: Catholic University of America

George Francis Korkmas (born August 2, 1931) was an American politician who served in the Texas House of Representatives from 1961 to 1963.

George Francis Korkmas was born on August 2, 1931, in Tyler, Texas, to Lebanese parents. He graduated from Tyler High School in 1948. He attended the Catholic University of America and graduated in 1952 with a degree in chemical engineering. That same year, he married his wife, Theresa Eltife.

In 1961, he was elected in a special election to fill a vacancy left by the resignation of Peter J. La Valle. He was the first Republican to represent Galveston County in the Texas House of Representatives since Reconstruction.

== Personal life ==
He married his wife, Theresa Eltife, on June 22, 1952. They have five children: three girls and two boys. His wife Theresa died on January 26, 2019.
