= Jane Nelson =

Texas Secretary of State since 2023

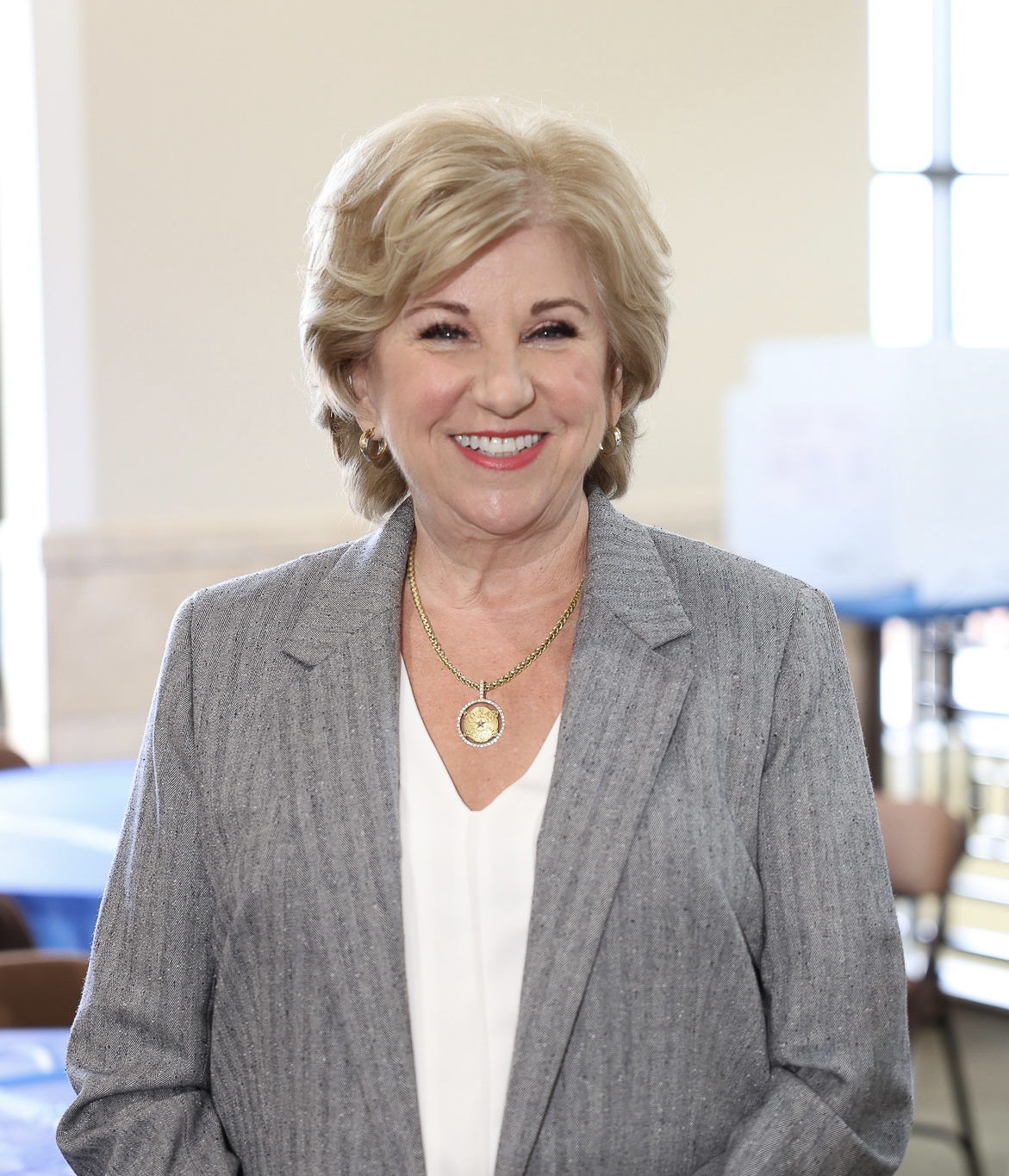
- Nelson in 2024

115th Secretary of State of Texas
- In office January 5, 2023 – July 17, 2026
- Governor: Greg Abbott
- Preceded by: John Scott
- Succeeded by: Robert Howden

President pro tempore of the Texas Senate
- In office June 2, 2003 – April 20, 2004
- Preceded by: Eddie Lucio Jr.
- Succeeded by: Jeff Wentworth

Member of the Texas Senate
- In office January 1, 1993 – January 3, 2023
- Preceded by: Bob Glasgow
- Succeeded by: Tan Parker
- Constituency: 22nd district (1993–1995); 9th district (1995–2003); 12th district (2003–2023)

Personal details
- Born: Jane Gray; October 5, 1951 (age 75) Hamilton, Ohio, U.S.
- Party: Republican
- Spouse: Michael Nelson
- Children: 5
- Education: University of North Texas (BS)

Jane Gray Nelson (née Gray; born October 5, 1951) is an American businesswoman and former school teacher who served as the Secretary of State of Texas from 2023 to 2026. She previously served as a Texas state senator who represented Texas Senate District 12. She was elected to the Senate in 1992 after serving two two-year terms (1988–1992) on the Texas State Board of Education. In 2023, Governor Greg Abbott appointed Nelson to succeed John B. Scott as Secretary of State. She was sworn in to that office on Saturday, January 7.

== Texas Senate ==
In October 2019, the Texas Parent Teacher Association named Nelson a Texas PTA Champion for Children for her leadership during the 86th legislative session.

In July 2021, Nelson announced she would not seek an 11th term to the Texas Senate.

=== Senate Finance Committee ===
In 2014 Nelson was appointed chair of the Senate Finance Committee, the first woman of either party to hold that position. In that capacity she authored four state budgets. Her chairmanship ended in January 2022. In June 2022, the Senate Finance committee dedicated its conference room to Nelson.

== Secretary of State ==
When Nelson was confirmed to the role of Secretary of State by the Senate, she became the first nominee to be confirmed since 2017. In the Texas Legislature the Secretary of State presides over the House of Representatives until a Speaker is elected. With her presiding over the opening of the 88th Legislature, she became the first person to preside over an opening of both chambers of the State Legislature.

During her tenure, Nelson oversaw Texas' withdrawal from Electronic Registration Information Center (ERIC) over election integrity concerns. Texas signed memorandums of understanding with several other states to share voter registration data as a replacement to the system.

Nelson resigned as secretary in July 2026.

Texas Senate
Preceded by Eddie Lucio Jr.	President pro tempore of the Texas Senate; 2003–2004	Succeeded by Jeff Wentworth
Political offices
Preceded by John Scott	Secretary of State of Texas; 2023–2026	Succeeded by Robert Howden; Acting
