= Ken Paxton =

American politician and lawyer (born 1962)

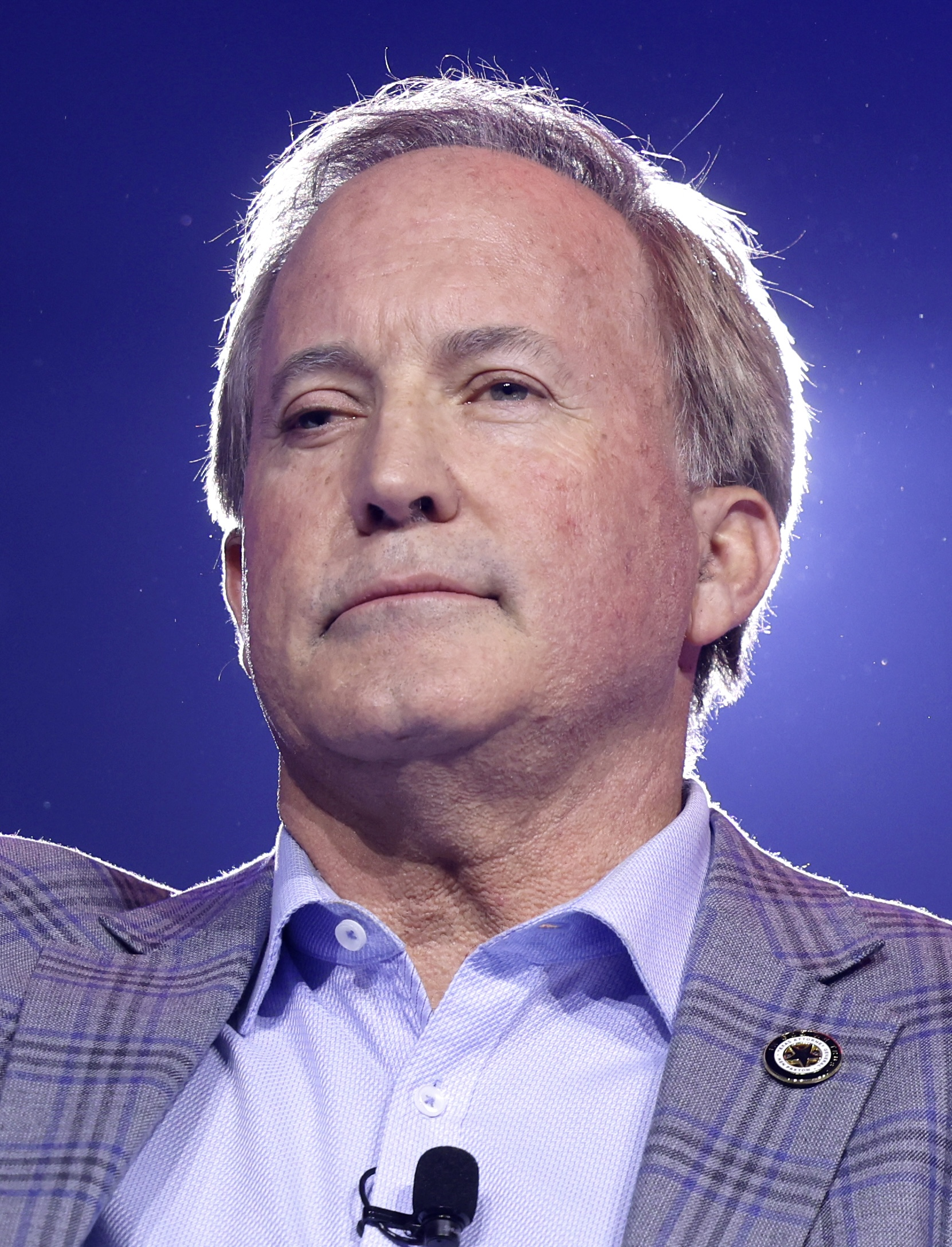
- Paxton in 2025

51st Attorney General of Texas
- Incumbent
- Assumed office January 5, 2015; Suspended: May 27 – September 16, 2023 (Note: During Paxton's suspension, three people served as acting or interim attorney general: Paxton's deputy Brent Webster until May 31, John Scott until July 14, and Angela Colmenero until Paxton was reinstated.)
- Governor: Rick Perry; Greg Abbott
- Preceded by: Greg Abbott

Member of the Texas Senate from the 8th district
- In office January 8, 2013 – January 4, 2015
- Preceded by: Florence Shapiro
- Succeeded by: Van Taylor

Member of the Texas House of Representatives from the 70th district
- In office January 14, 2003 – January 8, 2013
- Preceded by: David Counts
- Succeeded by: Scott Sanford

Personal details
- Born: Warren Kenneth Paxton Jr. December 23, 1962 (age 63) Minot, North Dakota, U.S.
- Party: Republican
- Spouse: Angela Allen (m. 1986; div. 2026)
- Children: 4
- Education: Baylor University (BA, MBA); University of Virginia (JD)
- Website: Office website Campaign website
- Paxton's voice Paxton on the immigration policy of the first Trump administration Recorded January 10, 2019

Warren Kenneth Paxton Jr. (born December 23, 1962) is an American politician and lawyer who has served as the 51st attorney general of Texas since 2015. He was the Republican nominee in the 2026 United States Senate election in Texas.

Born in Minot, North Dakota, Paxton was a member of the Texas House of Representatives from 2003 to 2013 and represented the eighth district in the Texas Senate from 2013 to 2015. In 2015, Paxton was indicted on state securities fraud charges relating to activities before taking office; the charges were dismissed nine years later without any requirement to admit any wrongdoing. In 2023, Paxton was impeached by the Texas House of Representatives, and the Texas Senate voted later in 2023 to acquit Paxton of all articles of impeachment.

An ultraconservative or far-right politician, Paxton is a staunch ally of President Donald Trump. After Joe Biden won the 2020 U.S. presidential election and Trump refused to concede while making claims of election fraud, Paxton aided Trump in his efforts to overturn the result. He filed the unsuccessful Texas v. Pennsylvania case in the U.S. Supreme Court and spoke at the rally Trump held on January 6, 2021, that preceded the January 6 United States Capitol attack. Throughout the course of Biden's presidency, Paxton pursued legal action against the administration 106 times, with a success rate of about two-thirds.

Paxton ran for the United States Senate in Texas in 2026 and defeated the incumbent Republican senator John Cornyn in the primary election after being endorsed by Trump, but lost to the Democratic Party challenger James Talarico in the general election.

== Early life and education ==
Paxton's 1986 university yearbook photo

Paxton was born on Minot Air Force Base in North Dakota, where his father was stationed while in the United States Air Force. His parents and their three children lived in a trailer parked outside wherever his father was temporarily stationed. They lived in Florida, New York, North Carolina, California, and Oklahoma. He graduated from MacArthur High School in Lawton, Oklahoma.

At the age of twelve, Paxton nearly lost an eye in a game of hide-and-seek; a misdiagnosis led to long-term problems with his vision. He further injured his eye while in college.

Paxton received a bachelor's degree in psychology in 1985 and an MBA in 1986, both from Baylor University. He was elected president of the student government. In 1991, he received a Juris Doctor degree from the University of Virginia School of Law. After graduating from law school, he worked at the law firm of Strasburger & Price and as in-house counsel for JCPenney. In 2002, he opened his own law practice, specializing in estate planning, probate matters and real estate.

== Texas Legislature (2003–2015) ==
=== Texas House of Representatives (2003–2013) ===
In 2002, Paxton ran in the Republican primary for the Texas House in District 70. He captured 39.45% of the vote and moved into a runoff with Bill Vitz, whom he then defeated with 64% of the vote. He faced Fred Lusk (D) and Robert Worthington (L) for the newly redistricted open seat. On November 4, 2002, Paxton won with 28,012 votes to Lusk's 7,074 votes and Worthington's 600 votes.

Paxton won reelection against Democrat Martin Woodward in 2004, receiving 76% of the vote, or 58,520 votes, compared with 18,451 votes for Woodward. Paxton won reelection in 2006, defeating Rick Koster (D) and Robert Virasin (L). Paxton received 30,062 votes to Koster's 12,265 votes and Virasin's 1,222 votes. Paxton won reelection by again defeating Robert Virasin (L), 73,450 votes to 11,751 votes. Paxton ran unopposed for reelection in 2010.

In 2010, Paxton ran for speaker of the Texas House of Representatives against fellow Republicans Joe Straus of District 121 in Bexar County and Warren Chisum of District 88 in Pampa, Texas. Paxton said that if elected speaker, he would take "bold action in defense of our conservative values". Sensing certain defeat, Paxton pulled out of the speaker's race before the vote. Paxton was endorsed by HuckPAC, the political action committee (PAC) of Mike Huckabee, and was endorsed by the NRA Political Victory Fund. Straus was elected to his second term as speaker and was reelected in 2013, 2015, and 2017.

=== Texas Senate (2013–2015) ===
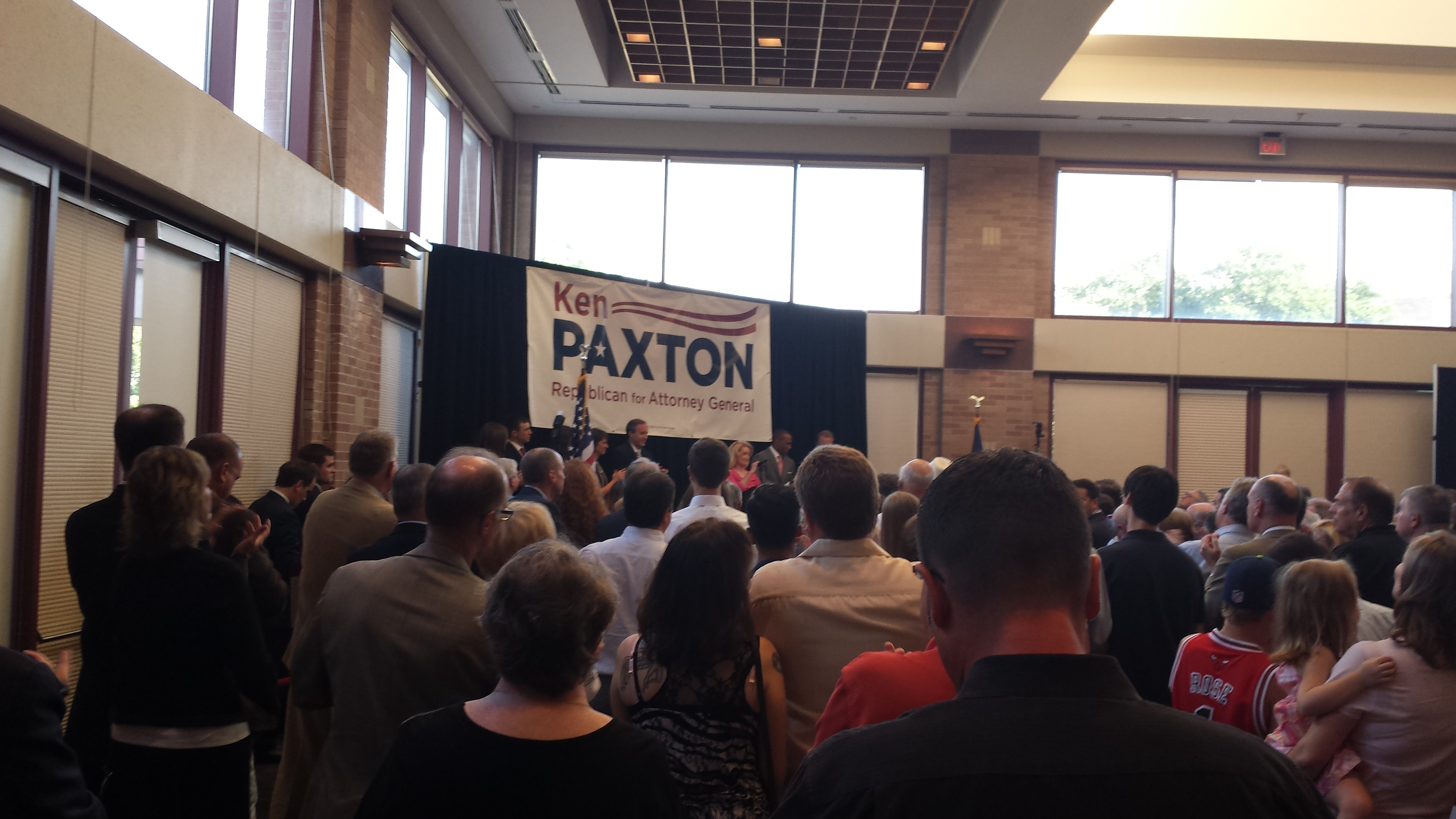
Paxton's 2013 campaign announcement

After winning the 2012 election, Paxton replaced the retiring Florence Shapiro in the Texas Senate. He served from 2013 until January 2015, when his term as attorney general began.

== Attorney General of Texas (2015–present) ==
=== Elections ===
==== 2014 ====
Paxton became a candidate for Texas attorney general when the incumbent Greg Abbott decided to run for governor. Paxton led a three-candidate field in the Republican primary on March 4, 2014, polling 566,114 votes (44.4%). State representative Dan Branch of Dallas County received 426,595 votes (33.5 percent), and Texas Railroad commissioner Barry Smitherman polled the remaining 281,064 (22.1 percent). Paxton faced Branch in the runoff election on May 27, 2014, and won with 465,395 votes (63.63 percent). Branch received 265,963 votes (36.36 percent).

In the November 4, 2014, general election, Paxton defeated Democrat Sam Houston, an attorney from Houston.

Paxton took office on January 5, 2015. Paxton's campaign raised $945,000 in the first half of 2016, leaving Paxton with just under $3 million in his campaign account for a potential 2018 re-election bid.

Paxton won the attorney general's election without the endorsement of a single Texas newspaper.

==== 2018 ====
In 2018, Paxton ran unopposed for reelection in the Republican primary. Having received the endorsement of U.S. president Donald Trump, Paxton won a second term as attorney general in the general election on November 6, 2018, narrowly defeating Democratic nominee Justin Nelson, a lawyer, and Libertarian Party nominee Michael Ray Harris by a margin of 4,173,538 (50.6 percent) to 3,874,096 (47 percent) and Harris receiving 2.4%. Justin Nelson's campaign ad for attorney general included surveillance video from the Collin County courthouse in 2012, showing Paxton taking a Montblanc pen worth $1,000, which had been accidentally left behind at a metal detector by fellow lawyer Joe Joplin. The pen was later returned "when the error was realized", said a spokesman for Paxton.

==== 2022 ====
Paxton in 2021

The 2022 Texas attorney general election took place on November 8, 2022, with Paxton winning a third term defeating Democratic candidate and immigration lawyer Rochelle Mercedes Garza. Paxton had advanced to the November 8 general election after a contested four-way primary contest on March 1 which resulted in no candidate receiving a majority and resulted in a May 24 runoff between Paxton and Texas's Land Commissioner George P. Bush.

=== 2026 ===
In February 2026, the Hood County Attorney requested an attorney general opinion on whether the county could declare a moratorium on industrial development, amid proposals for data centers in the county. As of August 2026, the request remained pending.

=== Property tax crackdown ===
On May 14, 2026, Paxton issued a decree halting the implementation of property tax increases in 132 municipalities across the state. In a formal statement, Paxton asserted that the decision was motivated by a concern for the economic well-being of Texas families, who are already grappling with elevated costs of living. He emphasized that the state would not permit property tax hikes to proceed without a satisfactory demonstration of justification and transparency by local authorities. Paxton's office further maintained that the affected municipalities had not satisfactorily complied with the stringent new state regulations governing property tax growth, which were designed to promote fiscal prudence and accountability among local governments. The Attorney General's decree constitutes a pivotal component of a sustained initiative aimed at ensuring that municipal governments adhere to the stipulations of Senate Bill 1851, enacted in 2025. His decision received widespread acclaim from conservative advocacy groups and taxpayer organizations, who commended Paxton for his alleged resistance to perceived local government overreach. Conversely, Democratic officials and progressive organizations vociferously condemned the move, characterizing it as an instance of unwarranted interference in the affairs of local municipalities. Meanwhile, homeowner advocacy groups enthusiastically welcomed the decision, which, if successful, could potentially yield significant collective savings for Texas property owners, estimated to be in the millions of dollars.

On August 17, 2026, Paxton transmitted notifications to more than 110 municipalities, effectively restricting their ability to establish property tax rates above a certain threshold, owing to a failure to comply with state-mandated financial reporting and transparency standards. The decision is a direct consequence of a thorough examination of over 1,000 municipalities, which entailed the solicitation and scrutiny of pertinent documentation from each local government entity, with the ultimate aim of evaluating their conformity with relevant state statutes and regulations. The inquiry, designed to guarantee adherence to state legislation and protect taxpayers from illegal tax hikes, remains ongoing, with the possibility of further findings emerging as the remaining municipalities are assessed for conformity with Senate Bill 1851, thereby ensuring the continued integrity of the tax administration process.

=== Impeachment ===
State of Texas, Impeachment of Ken Paxton
- Accused: Ken Paxton
- Date: May 27, 2023 to September 16, 2023
- Outcome: Acquitted
- Charges: 20 articles of impeachment

==== Texas House investigation ====
In late February 2023, Paxton asked the Appropriations subcommittee of the Texas House of Representatives to provide more taxpayer funds to his office, including the full amount of the intended $3.3 million settlement of the lawsuit brought by whistleblowers from his office. In March 2023, the Texas House General Investigating Committee began to investigate Paxton. The committee in May 2023 stated that "Paxton's own request for taxpayer-funded settlement over his wrongful conduct" triggered the investigation for impeachment. A spokeswoman for Texas House speaker Dade Phelan concurred, stating in May 2023 that it was due to Paxton demanding taxpayer funds for the settlement "without providing sufficient information or evidence in support of his request".

On May 23, 2023, on the eve of the committee's public release of its report, Paxton accused Phelan of performing his Texas speaker duties the week prior in a "state of apparent debilitating intoxication", demanded that Phelan resign, and demanded that the House General Investigating Committee investigate Phelan. In response, Phelan said that Paxton's statement was "little more than a last ditch effort to save face" given the investigation into Paxton.

Later that day, the House General Investigating Committee revealed to the public its months-long investigation of Paxton and subpoenaed Paxton and his office. The following day, investigators testified to their conclusions regarding Paxton to the General Investigating Committee, alleging that he had committed various crimes, including felonies, while in office. Paxton dismissed the investigators, claiming it was conducted by "highly partisan Democrat lawyers"; the investigative team had in fact served as prosecutors for both Republican and Democratic administrations, and collectively, had contributed "several times more money to Republicans than to Democrats" over the preceding ten years.

==== Impeachment and suspension from office ====
On May 25, 2023, the Republican-led House General Investigating Committee unanimously recommended that Paxton be impeached. The committee filed 20 articles of impeachment, with the committee's investigation producing the following allegations:

1. Paxton ignored his official duty to protect charities when he directed his office to interfere in the Mitte Foundation charity's lawsuit against Nate Paul, a political donor to Paxton.
2. Paxton abused his official power to issue written legal opinions when he directed his office to write an opinion to prevent Paul's properties from being sold in foreclosure, and also had his office reverse their legal conclusions, in an attempt to benefit Paul. To cover up his direction, Paxton arranged for a Senate committee chairperson to seek the above opinion. (Note: The committee chairperson discussed in Article 2 is Republican state senator Bryan Hughes, whom the House General Investigating Committee characterized as a "straw requestor".)
3. Paxton abused his official power by directing his office to violate the law regarding two public information requests, one of which concerned Department of Public Safety records for a criminal investigation of Paul.
4. Paxton abused his official power to improperly obtain private information in an attempt to release it for Paul's benefit.
5. Paxton abused his official power by hiring a special prosecutor, Brandon Cammack, to investigate a "baseless complaint" made by Paul; Cammack would issue over 30 grand jury subpoenas to benefit Paul.
6. Paxton ignored his official duty by improperly firing whistleblowers in his office who had in "good faith" alleged to authorities that Paxton had broken the law; Paxton also privately and publicly tried to tarnish the whistleblowers' reputations and harm their chances of future employment.
7. Paxton wrongly used public resources by having his office conduct a "sham investigation" into the whistleblowers' allegations, and having his office create a report "containing false or misleading statements in Paxton's defense".
8. Paxton abused his official power in his attempt to settle the whistleblowers' lawsuit, which "delayed the discovery of facts and testimony at trial, to Paxton's advantage", preventing voters from gaining knowledge regarding Paxton.
9. Paxton accepted a bribe by Paul's employment of a woman "with whom Paxton was having an extramarital affair", and in return Paxton used his office to help Paul.
10. Paxton accepted a bribe by having Paul (a real estate developer) renovate Paxton's home, and in return Paxton used his office to help Paul.
11. Paxton obstructed justice by delaying his trial for federal securities fraud after being indicted in 2015, preventing voters from gaining knowledge regarding Paxton.
12. Paxton obstructed justice by benefiting from a lawsuit filed by his political donor, Jeff Blackard, that caused problems in paying the prosecutors working on Paxton's securities fraud case, delaying the trial and discovery of evidence, preventing voters from gaining knowledge regarding Paxton.
13. Paxton made false statements to the State Securities Board regarding his illegal failure to register with them.
14. Paxton did not accurately reveal his financial interests to the Texas Ethics Commission, violating law.
15. Paxton made or directed for multiple false or misleading statements to be published in his office's report responding to the whistleblower allegations.
16. Paxton conspired or tried to conspire with other people for the actions detailed in the articles of impeachment.
17. Paxton abused his official power by having his office act to benefit him or other people.
18. Paxton ignored his duty and violated the Texas Constitution, his oaths of office, statutes and public policy for the actions detailed in the articles of impeachment.
19. Paxton was unfit for holding office for the actions detailed in the articles of impeachment.
20. Paxton abused or neglected his official power to prevent lawful governance and obstruct justice, bringing his office into "scandal and disrepute" for the actions detailed in the articles of impeachment.

Texas House voted 121–23 in favor of impeachment on May 27, 2023. Sixty Republicans and sixty-one Democrats voted to impeach; all twenty-three who voted against were Republicans. Paxton became only the third statewide official in Texas history to be impeached, after Commissioner of the General Land Office William L. McGaughey in 1893 and Governor James E. Ferguson in 1917. It was also the first trial to be held since the impeachment of district judge O. P. Carillo in 1975. Upon being impeached, Paxton was automatically suspended from office pending a trial in the Texas Senate. First assistant attorney general Brent Webster became the acting attorney general, until Governor Abbott appointed John B. Scott as interim attorney general three days later. Paxton was not paid his salary during his suspension.

==== Split within Republican Party ====
Paxton called his impeachment a "politically motivated sham"; called on his supporters to peacefully march on the state Capitol in protest; and declared that "the RINOs in the Texas Legislature are now on the same side as Joe Biden," characterizing the impeachment proceedings as an attempt to "sabotage [Texas's] legal challenges to Biden's extremist agenda". During the legislative session on impeachment, Charlie Geren, a Republican on the General Investigating Committee who is also speaker pro tempore, said, "several members of this House, while on the floor of this House doing the state's business, received telephone calls from Paxton personally, threatening them with political consequences in our next election."

Paxton's impeachment highlighted increasing rifts within the Texas Republican Party, which has dominated Texas politics for years. Republican hard-liners rallied behind Paxton after his impeachment. Former president Donald Trump, writing on his social media network Truth Social, called Paxton's impeachment "election interference", lashed out against Speaker Phelan, and depicted the impeachment as a plot by "Radical Left Democrats" and "RINOS". Trump said he would fight fellow Republicans who supported Paxton's ouster. Other Republicans who rallied in support of Paxton included Trump's key allies, such as son Donald Trump Jr. and former aide Stephen Miller; U.S. senator Ted Cruz (who called the impeachment a "travesty" and praised Paxton as "a steadfast conservative AG"); and Matt Rinaldi, the state party chair.

==== Impeachment trial ====
After the impeachment, the Texas House of Representatives appointed twelve representatives (seven Republicans and five Democrats) to serve as impeachment managers (analogous to prosecutors) at the impeachment trial in the thirty-one-member State Senate. Of the dozen selected, eleven had law degrees. They were led by Republican representative Andrew Murr as chair and Democratic representative Ann Johnson as vice chair. The House Committee on General Investigating also hired attorneys Rusty Hardin and Dick DeGuerin as impeachment prosecutors. Paxton's main defense lawyer was Tony Buzbee.

The Senate appointed a committee to recommend rules and procedures for the impeachment trial to the full Senate, and the committee reported on June 20.

One of the senators was Paxton's wife, Angela Paxton. The two spouses had been involved in each other's political campaigns and careers. Angela Paxton did not say whether she would recuse herself, but the Senate voted on June 21, 2023, to bar her from voting in her husband's impeachment trial. However, Angela Paxton was still required to attend the trial, and because conviction and removal from office require a two-thirds vote, her presence made it more difficult to remove her husband.

Republican Dan Patrick, as lieutenant governor, presided over the trial despite having donated $125,000 — and loaned another $125,000 — to Paxton's close reelection campaign in 2018. A few months before the trial Defend Texas Liberty PAC a political action committee promoting far-right candidates, gave a $1 million contribution and a $2 million loan to Patrick's campaign. The PAC also made known it would politically target Republican legislators who had voted for impeachment. A few days before the trial began, Patrick selected Lana Myers, a retired Fifth Court of Appeals of Texas judge, to serve as his legal counsel during the trial.

At least two additional Republican senators had conflicts of interest or financial connections with Paxton. A legal opinion requested by Republican senator Bryan Hughes at Paxton's behest was central to the second article of impeachment. Under normal Texas rules of court procedure, a material witness may not serve as a juror. Hughes was on list of witnesses whom the prosecutors intend to call to testify during the impeachment trial. Republican senator Donna Campbell also formerly employed the woman who allegedly had an extramarital affair with Paxton; the woman was also on the list of expected witnesses.

The impeachment trial began on September 5, 2023, in the Texas Senate, in which there were 19 Republicans and 12 Democrats. On the first day of the trial, Paxton entered a plea of not guilty, and both sides delivered opening statements. The Senate voted down, 24–6, Paxton's motion to dismiss all the charges; other motions to dismiss individual counts were also rejected.

On September 16, 2023, Paxton's impeachment trial concluded with a majority of sixteen Republican senators voting to acquit Paxton on every article of impeachment. All twelve Democratic senators, plus two Republican senators (Kelly Hancock and Robert Nichols) voted to convict Paxton on at least one article of impeachment—short of the twenty-one senators needed to convict. The acquittal cleared the path for Paxton to resume his duties as attorney general.

=== Out-of-state travel ===
The Associated Press reported in October 2026 that Paxton had traveled to places such as the California wine country, Caribbean resorts, and popular European tourism destinations on over 275 trips. His "jet-setting lifestyle" had incurred at least $1.8 million in reimbursements for his security detail's travel expenses outside Texas, increasing from $15,000 in 2015 to $400,000 in 2024. He left a total of about 730 workdays blank on his official calendar, including 112 in 2024, the last year for which the Associated Press was able to obtain full records. Paxton spent increasingly more time away from Texas, filing partisan lawsuits in support of Trump's agenda and becoming an omnipresence in conservative media.

The Wall Street Journal reported in October 2026 that Paxton and a girlfriend had celebrated New Year's eve 2024 in Dubai at a party that included two men who were sought by U.S. authorities on federal health-care fraud charges for embezzling $15 million from a Chicago hospital. One of the men, Anosh Ahmed, was also indicted for allegedly defrauding the federal government of at least $195 million related to COVID-19 testing. He had donated $190,000 to Paxton, including a $25,000 donation the day after Ahmed was indicted.

=== Vaccine incentive probe ===
In January 2026, Texas Attorney General Ken Paxton initiated an inquiry into a purported complex scheme, allegedly designed to promote the adoption of childhood vaccines whose safety and necessity have not been empirically verified. At the inception of the investigation, Paxton's office issued more than 20 civil investigative demands to a diverse range of entities, encompassing healthcare providers, insurance companies, and manufacturers. In a public statement, Attorney General Paxton articulated his commitment to preventing pharmaceutical companies and insurance providers from exerting undue influence over healthcare providers, thereby potentially coercing parents into administering vaccines to their children that they deem unsafe or unnecessary. Subsequently, in August 2026, Paxton's office initiated a separate investigation into the American Academy of Pediatrics (AAP), hypothesizing that financial relationships with pharmaceutical companies may have had a bearing on the academy's vaccine recommendations. As of October 8, 2026, the investigation initiated by Paxton's office remains ongoing, with no charges filed or formal court determinations issued. Concurrrently, the outcome of a federal lawsuit challenging the removal of seven vaccines from universal childhood vaccination recommendations remains pending, awaiting a judicial resolution.

== 2026 U.S. Senate campaign ==
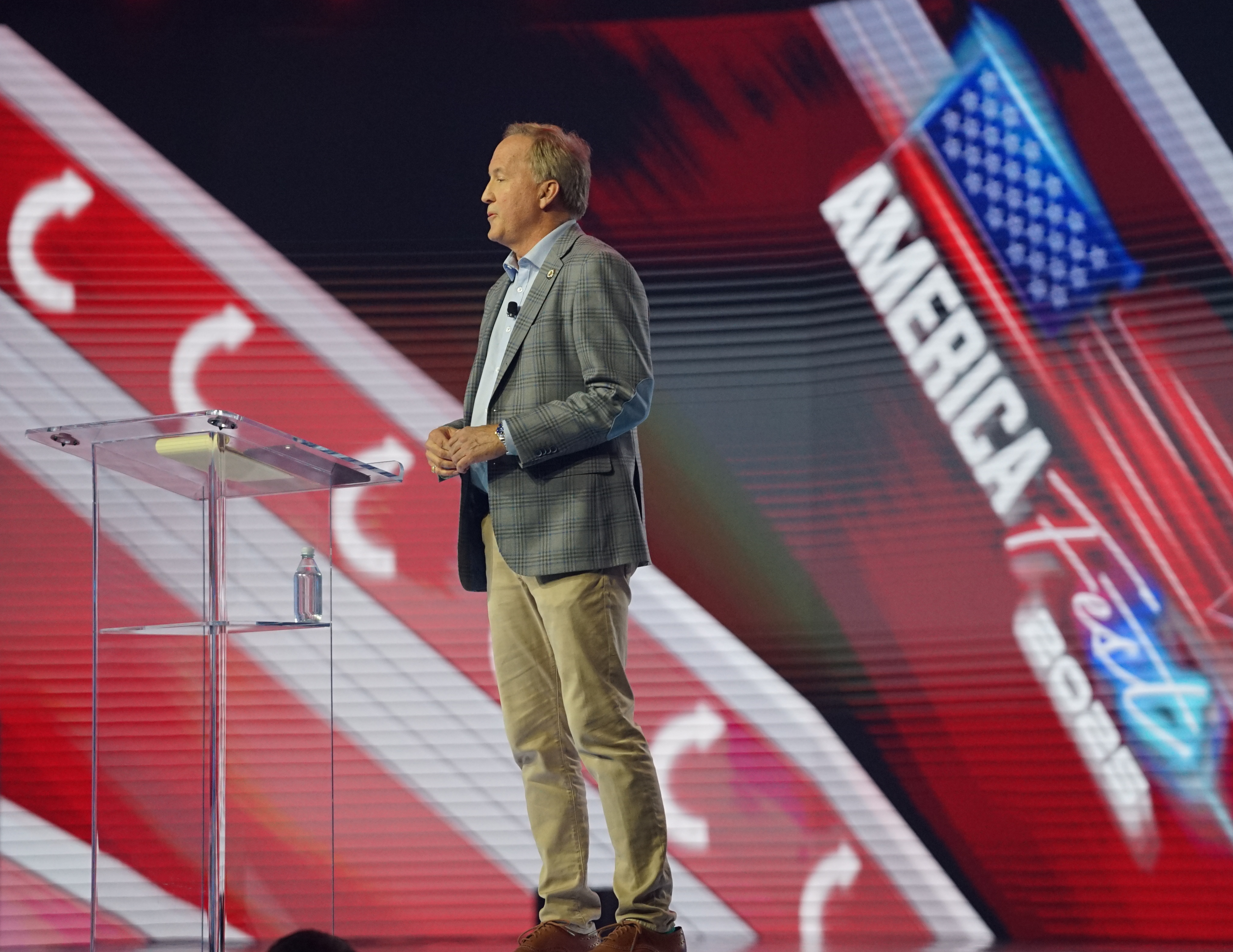
Paxton at AmericaFest 2025

On April 8, 2025, Paxton went on the Fox News program The Ingraham Angle to announce his candidacy for the U.S. Senate, challenging incumbent Senator John Cornyn. The primary occurred on March 3, 2026. His opponents were Cornyn and U.S. representative for Texas's 38th congressional district Wesley Hunt. Paxton advanced to the runoff against Cornyn after neither received 50% of the vote.

The runoff occurred on May 26, 2026, and having secured President Donald Trump's endorsement, Paxton defeated Cornyn by more than 25 points. Despite being outspent nine to one by Cornyn, Paxton became the first individual in 56 years to win a primary against a sitting Texas senator. He was beaten by James Talarico in the November general election, the first Republican Senate loss in Texas since 1988. The general election was significantly less competitive than forecast; Talarico's 12% margin of victory exceeded his polling average by about 9%.

Talarico raised far more money from individual donors than Paxton, but Paxton received a massive infusion of PAC and political party spending to buoy his sagging polling numbers leading into the fall campaign season, particularly after the Republican National Convention in Dallas. NOTUS reported that through June 2026, Paxton's campaign, leadership PAC, joint fundraising committees, and an allied super PAC had received at least $448,000 from executives and PACs of companies that build, operate or invest in data centers. The race was the most expensive in American history with over $560 million in combined spending by both sides. Paxton's support came primarily from super PACs led by Texas PAC, which spent over $178M, of which $158M came from Elon Musk. Since Texas PAC was legally prohibited from coordinating with the Paxton campaign, it primarily funded negative ads targeting Talarico. Musk was Paxton's most generous supporter, ultimately giving over $200M, mostly to super PACs.

== Tenure as attorney general and political positions ==
Paxton and his top donors have been characterized as leaders of the political far-right in Texas.

=== Abortion ===
Paxton supports bans on access to abortion. He gave his employees a paid vacation day to celebrate the overturning of Roe v. Wade.

Paxton has sought to block rules from the Department of Health and Human Services that would require hospitals to provide abortions to women when the procedure is necessary to save their lives.

Paxton sued to block emergency abortions under the Emergency Medical Treatment and Active Labor Act. Judge James Wesley Hendrix blocked the guidance which was appealed to the Supreme Court in Moyle v. United States.

After Texas judge Maya Guerra Gamble ruled that Kate Cox, a pregnant woman whose fetus had the trisomy 18 condition, qualified for an abortion under the medical exemption provision in Texas law, Paxton in December 2023 called the judge an "activist" who was "not medically qualified" to make this ruling, threatened to prosecute doctors if they performed an abortion on Cox, and stated that Texas hospitals that allowed Cox's abortion could "be liable for negligent credentialing" the abortion-performing doctor. Paxton appealed Gamble's ruling to the Texas Supreme Court, arguing that "how long the child is expected to live" was irrelevant to the case, and that Cox had not proven that the pregnancy threatened her life. The Supreme Court paused Gamble's ruling, leading to Cox leaving Texas to obtain an abortion; later the Texas Supreme Court ruled against Cox, stating that even though her pregnancy was "extremely complicated", even "serious" pregnancy difficulties do not meet Texas's medical exemption provision.

Paxton sued to block the 2024 Privacy Rule, which prohibits disclosing health information to investigate the act of seeking, obtaining, providing, or facilitating reproductive health care.

Paxton sued a New York doctor for providing "abortion-inducing drugs" to a Texas resident.

Paxton joined 14 other AG's "urging Congress to consider taking action preempting abortion shield laws".

==== Alleged evasion of service of subpoena ====
In 2022, Paxton was sued by Fund Texas Choice, a non-profit organization aiming to prevent Paxton from prosecuting people who assist Texans to receive out-of-state abortions. In September 2022, a process server alleged in an affidavit for the court that when he attempted to serve a subpoena to Paxton at his home, he saw Paxton coming to the door but turning back; Paxton's wife answered the door saying Paxton was on the phone, with the process server stating that he had important legal documents for Paxton; Paxton left the house an hour later but ran back into the house when the process server called his name; minutes later Paxton ran out of the house and left in a truck driven by his wife, ignoring the process server stating his intentions. Paxton responded claiming that the process server "yelled unintelligibly, and charged toward me. I perceived this person to be a threat", while further stating that the process server "is lucky this situation did not escalate further or necessitate force".

=== Affordable Care Act ===
Paxton initiated a lawsuit seeking to have the Affordable Care Act (Obamacare) ruled unconstitutional in its entirety.

=== Animal welfare ===
As attorney general, Paxton joined an amicus curiae brief at the US Supreme Court opposing California Proposition 12, which regulates the sale in California of animal products from farms that do not meet particular animal welfare standards: for example, farms that do not allow confined animals enough space to turn around, lie down, stand up, and extend their limbs. The amicus brief argued that "California [was attempting] to usurp other States' authority to set their own animal husbandry policies."

Paxton received criticism for a 2015 legal opinion which allowed Texas A&M University to conceal daily care logs of cats and dogs used in research.

=== Cannabis ===
Paxton has sued six Texas cities to remove cannabis decriminalization measures adopted by citizens in those municipalities. He argued that the local ordinances violated the Texas Constitution by causing a conflict with state law.

In 2026, after a prolonged debate in the legislature, a judicial ruling enacted a statewide ban on smokable hemp and products containing the Delta-8 and Delta-10 varieties of THC. When asked about his thoughts on the ban, Paxton responded, "I don't know the details of it."

=== Child sex abuse case ===
In 2023, Paxton's office took over the prosecution of Adam Dean Hoffman for child sex abuse. Unable to secure a conviction, Paxton's office offered the man a plea deal that included one day in jail and no requirement to register as a sex offender, a lenient sentence that drew criticism.

=== COVID-19 pandemic ===
In 2020, during the COVID-19 pandemic, Paxton threatened to file lawsuits against local governments unless they rescinded stay-at-home orders and rules regarding the use of face masks to combat the spread of coronavirus. The city of Austin encouraged restaurants to keep logs of contact information, so as to ensure contact tracing in the event of an outbreak; Paxton described this as "Orwellian". Paxton sued Austin again in December 2020 when the city implemented restrictions preventing indoor dining and drinking on New Years weekend amid surging COVID-19 cases. In March 2021, Paxton filed a lawsuit against Austin and Travis County, this time for the city and county continuing their local mask wearing requirements after Governor Abbott had signed an order ending the statewide mask-wearing mandate.

In May 2020, Paxton opposed an expansion of absentee voting to voters who lack immunity to COVID-19. A state district judge ruled that such voters could apply for absentee ballots under a statutory provision that accommodates disabled individuals. After the ruling, Paxton publicly contradicted the district judge and subsequently persuaded the Texas Supreme Court to address the issue of eligibility in a separate case he filed directly in that court, while putting the appeal of the district court case on hold.

During the 2020 election season, the mail-vote promotion was part of Harris County's measures to reduce the COVID-19 infection risk of in-person voting while maximizing opportunities for all voters to participate under pandemic conditions. Paxton sued Harris County Clerk Chris Hollins, seeking to block him from sending applications for absentee ballots to the county's 2.4 million registered voters accompanied by instructions regarding eligibility as clarified by the Texas Supreme Court. Paxton lost in the trial court and in the intermediate court of appeals, but the Texas Supreme Court reversed and directed the trial court to enter an injunction against Hollins. The Republican Party of Texas opposed the expansion of voting by mail and other accommodations and filed its own legal actions seeking to stop Hollins through the court system.

In 2023, Paxton sued the federal government in Texas v. Garland, asserting that $1.7 trillion federal spending law passed by Congress for fiscal year 2023 is invalid because of the lack of a physical quorum in the U.S. House of Representatives at the time of the bill's passage. Paxton argued that the House's decision in 2020 to allow the use of proxy voting during the COVID-19 pandemic was unconstitutional. A similar lawsuit, McCarthy v. Pelosi, had already been rejected by the U.S. Court of Appeals for the D.C. Circuit, and the U.S. Supreme Court declined to review that decision.

On 30 November 2023, Paxton took Pfizer to court, claiming the company exaggerated the effectiveness of its COVID-19 vaccine and misled the public. He argued that the company's claims about the vaccine's effectiveness were false and misleading, and that the company failed to prevent severe COVID-19 cases and deaths. He alleged that the vaccine manufacturer violated the Texas Deceptive Trade Practices Act and conspired to silence critics of the vaccine. His lawsuit was seeking to stop the company from making false claims about its COVID-19 vaccine and is also demanding a hefty fine of over $10 million. He claimed that the company withheld information that undermined its claims about the duration of protection and failed to measure whether the vaccine protects against transmission. He also noted that the vaccine's effectiveness was questioned, as COVID-19 cases increased after widespread vaccination, and some areas saw a higher percentage of deaths among the vaccinated population. Paxton stated that as the top law enforcement official in Texas, he was dedicated to using all available resources to defend the rights of citizens who were deceived and harmed by the company's actions.

=== Foreign affairs ===
==== Iran ====
Paxton supported President Donald Trump's strikes on Iran, during the first week of the 2026 Iran war. Paxton said, "I am very glad that he did it. Iran is a great threat to our country."

==== Israel ====
Paxton visited Israel as part of a 2017 National Association of Attorneys General delegation, reportedly "to promote business development and cultural ties".

As Texas's Attorney General, Paxton has defended the state's anti-BDS law. The Austin American-Statesman described it as a "state law that bars governmental entities from doing business with contractors who support a boycott of Israel". The law was challenged for whether it upheld freedom of speech and First Amendment rights. Paxton said, "The state of Texas has the right to boycott boycotters in this instance. Doing so does not suppress protected speech or expression." In October 2023, following the October 7 attacks, Paxton reaffirmed the state's anti-BDS law. He said "it is more important than ever to enforce public policy supportive of one of America's closest allies and a beacon of freedom in the Middle East."

In August 2025, Paxton announced an investigation into the Plano Independent School District about allegations of "antisemitic behavior" and anti-Israel curriculum. According to KERA News, this occurred "after teachers allegedly let students walk out to protest Israel's war in Gaza." Paxton said, "Any teacher or administrator that has facilitated or supported radical anti-Israel rhetoric in our schools should be fired immediately." The school district stated that they had been subject to "baseless allegations", but they would cooperate with the investigation.

=== Human trafficking ===
On October 6, 2016, Paxton and then-California attorney general Kamala Harris announced that Texas authorities had raided the Dallas headquarters of Backpage.com and arrested CEO Carl Ferrer at the George Bush Intercontinental Airport in Houston on felony charges of pimping, pimping a minor, and conspiracy to commit pimping. In a press release, Harris denounced Backpage as "the world's largest online brothel".

The California arrest warrant alleged that 99% of Backpage's revenue was directly attributable to prostitution-related ads and that many of the ads involved victims of sex trafficking, including children. The State of Texas was also considering a money laundering charge pending its investigation. Arrest warrants were issued against former Backpage owners and founders Michael Lacey and James Larkin. Lacey and Larkin were charged with conspiracy to commit pimping.

Paxton created a human trafficking unit in the Attorney General's office in 2015. In 2019, he convinced Texas lawmakers to more than quadruple the human trafficking unit's annual funding. In 2020 the unit did not secure a single human trafficking conviction and only four in 2021, two of which resulted in deferred adjudications.

=== Immigration ===
In 2018, Paxton claimed that undocumented immigrants had committed over 600,000 crimes since 2011 in Texas. PolitiFact said that it had debunked the numbers before, and that the numbers exceed the state's estimates by more than 400%. In 2024, ProPublica reported that Paxton had used consumer protection law to target Annunciation House, a nonprofit shelter that serves immigrants and refugees, calling for the charity to be shut down due to "systemic criminal conduct", and warning other charities serving immigrants they were "on notice".

==== Obama executive orders ====
Paxton led a coalition of 26 states challenging President Barack Obama's Deferred Action for Parents of Americans and Lawful Permanent Residents (DAPA) executive action, which granted deferred action status to certain undocumented immigrants who had lived in the United States since 2010 and had children who were American citizens or lawful permanent residents. Paxton argued that the president should not be allowed to "unilaterally rewrite congressional laws and circumvent the people's representatives". The Supreme Court heard the case, United States v. Texas, and issued a split 4-4 ruling in the case in June 2016. Because of the split ruling, a 2015 lower-court ruling invalidating Obama's plan was left in place.

In July 2017, Paxton led a group of ten Republican attorneys general and Idaho governor Butch Otter in threatening the Trump administration that they would litigate if the president did not terminate the Deferred Action for Childhood Arrivals policy that had been put into place by President Barack Obama. (The policy had never been implemented in Texas because of legal action on behalf of the state.)

==== Trump executive orders ====
In 2017, Paxton voiced support for the application of eminent domain to obtain right-of-way along the Rio Grande in Texas for construction of the border wall advocated by President Donald Trump as a means to curtail illegal immigration. Paxton said that private landowners must receive a fair price when property is taken for the pending construction. He said that the wall serves "a public purpose providing safety to people not only along the border, but to the entire nation. ... I want people to be treated fairly, so they shouldn't just have their land taken from them," but there must be just compensation.

In 2017, Paxton joined thirteen other state attorneys general in filing friend-of-the-court briefs in defense of both Trump's first and second executive orders on travel and immigration primarily from majority-Muslim countries (informally referred to as the "Muslim ban"). In filings in the U.S. Court of Appeals for the Ninth Circuit, U.S. Court of Appeals for the Fourth Circuit, and the U.S. Supreme Court, Paxton argued that the order—which places a 90-day ban on the issuance of visas to travel from six designated majority-Muslim countries, imposes a 120-day halt on the admission of refugees to the U.S., and caps annual refugee admissions to 50,000 people—is constitutionally and legally valid.

In May 2017, Paxton filed a preemptive lawsuit designed to ascertain the constitutionality of the new Texas law imposing penalties on sanctuary cities, known as SB 4, signed into law by Governor Greg Abbott. The law imposes penalties on local officials who place restrictions on their police forces or other agencies' cooperation with immigration enforcement, and requires county jails to honor requests from U.S. Immigration and Customs Enforcement to hold detainees suspected of being eligible for deportation. The suit asked the United States District Court for the Western District of Texas to clarify whether the law is at odds with the Fourth and Fourteenth constitutional amendments or is not in conflict with some other federal law. Paxton said that the measure "is constitutional, lawful and a vital step in securing our borders". Among those opposed to the measure are the police chiefs and sheriffs of some of the largest jurisdictions in Texas. Critics call the ban legalization of discrimination against minorities, and suits against the legislation are expected to be filed. Although initially key aspects of the law were enjoined by the court, the US Fifth Circuit Court of Appeals upheld nearly all of it on appeal, except for a provision that interfered with the First Amendment right to freedom of expression on the subject by local officials.

==== Biden administration ====
Throughout the course of Joe Biden's presidency, Paxton pursued legal action against the Biden administration 106 times, with about one loss in every three cases. These actions included multi-state challenges over federal authority regarding immigration policy. In Biden v. Texas (2022), the U.S. Supreme Court ruled 5–4 that the Biden administration possessed the legal authority to terminate the Trump-era Migrant Protection Protocols. In United States v. Texas (2023), the Supreme Court ruled 8–1 that Texas lacked the Article III standing required to challenge DHS guidelines prioritizing specific categories of non-citizens for deportation, affirming federal enforcement discretion.

=== Environment ===
In 2015, Volkswagen admitted that the company was using software that allowed its vehicles to circumvent emissions limits. Paxton was part of a lawsuit brought by 44 states against the company for violation of clean air protections. Texas's share of the final settlement was $50 million.

In 2016, Paxton mounted a legal challenge to the Clean Power Plan, which was President Obama's "state-by-state effort to fight climate change by shifting away from coal power to cleaner-burning natural gas and renewable resources". Paxton said that the Environmental Protection Agency (EPA) was trying to "force Texas to change how we regulate energy production" through an "unprecedented expansion of federal authority". The Clean Power Plan would require Texas to cut an annual average of 51 million tons of emissions, down 21 percent from 2012 levels. Paxton said the required reductions would cost the state jobs, increase electricity costs, and threaten reliability of the electrical grid. Paxton also claimed there was no evidence the plan would mitigate climate change, directly contradicting studies by the EPA that have shown the regulation would reduce carbon pollution by 870 million tons in 2030. He further asserted that the EPA lacks the statutory authority to write the state's policies.

Paxton was a staunch opponent of President Biden's environmental policies, joining Louisiana v. Biden in opposition to Executive Order 13990. He sued to challenge a requirement that the states set goals to reduce carbon emissions from vehicles, and also sued the Biden administration for classifying species as endangered claiming the administration was "Weaponizing Environmental Law". Paxton was also part of a joint lawsuit by 23 states to block the implementation of a methane emissions tax created under the Inflation Reduction Act.

==== ExxonMobil litigation ====
In 2016, Paxton was one of eleven Republican state attorneys general who sided with ExxonMobil in the company's suit to block a climate change probe by the Commonwealth of Massachusetts.

Paxton and the other state AGs filed an amicus curiae brief, contending that Massachusetts attorney general Maura Healey used her office to "tip the scales on a public policy debate, undermine the first Amendment and abuse the office's subpoena power". Healey had launched a probe of ExxonMobil's historical marketing and sale of fossil fuel products, requiring the company to produce forty years worth of documents regarding fossil fuel products and securities. Healey said the documents would prove that ExxonMobil "knew about the risks of climate change decades ago and fraudulently concealed that knowledge from the public". The amicus brief supported Exxon Mobil's motion for a preliminary injunction. Paxton questioned Healey's use of law-enforcement authority in an "ongoing public policy debate of international importance". Paxton described Healey's attempts to obtain historical company records for a public policy debate as a threat to freedom of speech, stating: "The Constitution was written to protect citizens from government witch-hunts that are nothing more than an attempt to suppress speech on an issue of public importance, just because a government official happens to disagree with that particular viewpoint." The brief portrayed climate change as an issue that was still a matter of scientific debate, although in fact the scientific consensus is that the earth is warming and human activity is primarily responsible.

U.S. Virgin Islands attorney general Claude Walker had also issued a subpoena for Exxon's records. Paxton issued a request to intervene in the case, stating: "What is Exxon Mobil's transgression? Holding a view about climate change that the attorney general of the Virgin Islands disagrees with. This is about the criminalization of speech and thought." Walker dropped the subpoena in June 2016.

=== Labor lawsuits ===
Paxton sued the Obama administration over a 2016 rule by the Department of Labor that would have made five million additional workers eligible for overtime pay. The rule would have meant workers earning up to an annual salary of $47,500 would become eligible for overtime pay when working more than forty hours per week. Paxton has said the new regulations "may lead to disastrous consequences for our economy". Along with Texas, twenty other states joined the lawsuit.

Paxton is involved in a legal challenge to a rule by the Department of Labor which forces employers to report any "actions, conduct, or communications" undertaken to "affect an employee's decisions regarding his or her representation or collective bargaining rights". Known as the "persuader rule", the new regulation went into effect in April 2016. Opponents of the rule say it will prevent employers from speaking on labor issues or seeking legal counsel. In June 2016, a federal judge granted a preliminary injunction against the rule. Paxton called the injunction "a victory for the preservation of the sanctity of attorney-client confidentiality".

=== LGBT rights ===
As attorney general, Paxton appointed several social conservatives and prominent opponents of LGBT rights to positions in his department.

In June 2015, after the issuance of the Obergefell v. Hodges decision, in which the Supreme Court ruled that same-sex couples have a constitutional right to marry, Paxton offered support for clerks who refused to issue marriage licenses to same-sex couples. His statement said, "I will do everything I can from this office to be a public voice for those standing in defense of their rights."

In 2016, Paxton led a coalition of 13 states that sought an injunction to block a guidance letter issued by the Department of Education and Department of Justice that interpreted Title IX to require public schools to allow transgender students to use restrooms that accorded with their gender identity. Paxton submitted court filings alleging the Obama administration had "conspired to turn workplaces and educational settings across the country into laboratories for a massive social experiment" and termed the directive a "gun to the head" that threatens the independence of school districts. In September 2016, Paxton and his wife had dinner with activist Amber Briggle and her family, including her trans son. The states dropped the suit after the directive was revoked by President Donald Trump.

On February 18, 2022, Paxton issued a new interpretation of Texas law in a written opinion that characterized gender-affirming health care (such as hormone treatments and puberty blockers) for transgender youths as child abuse. On February 28, Amber Briggle was notified that the Texas Department of Family and Protective Services had opened an investigation into her family. On March 11, a Texas District Court issued a temporary injunction, which temporarily stopped state investigations into families who provide gender-affirming medical care for their children, and scheduled a trial for July 11, 2022.

In June 2022, Paxton said he would defend state laws prohibiting sodomy or consensual same-sex sexual relationships if the Supreme Court precedent invalidating such laws, the Lawrence v. Texas decision, was overturned. On March 17, 2022, Paxton made a post on Twitter in which he referred to U.S. assistant secretary for health Rachel Levine—a trans woman—as a man. Twitter flagged the tweet for violating its conduct rules, but did not remove the post. The following day, Paxton tweeted a statement in which he again referred to Levine as a man, and stated that he was "exploring legal options" against Twitter. During that same month, Paxton's office requested a list of citizens who had changed their gender on their driver's licenses, circumventing the accepted procedure of contacting DPS's government relations and general counsel's offices by instead directly contacting the driver license division staff. No reason was given for this request. In August, the data was provided to Paxton's office, despite that in November 2022, officials indicated the office had no such information.

In May 2023, one of Paxton's Consumer Protection lawyers sent a letter to Dell Children's Medical Center in Austin demanding documents related to counseling and the use of puberty blockers for transgender youth, then did the same for Texas Children's Hospital in Houston three weeks later. Months later, he began investigating out-of-state entities for similar activities, including the Seattle Children's Hospital in Washington state, QueerMed in Georgia, and PFLAG Inc. in Washington D.C. In December 2023, the Texas attorney general's office was sued by Seattle Children's Hospital for having subpoenaed private medical information about any minors of Texas residence who may have received gender-affirming medical care. The AG's office responded that it was investigating the hospital for deceptive trade practices. The suit seeks to have the subpoena dismissed and alleges that Paxton overstepped his authority, requested information protected by federal and state law, violated Washington state's shield law, and that the subpoena is an effort to chill travel to Washington for medical care. In April 2024, Seattle Children's Hospital and Paxton reached a settlement in which the hospital agreed to withdraw its Texas business license and Paxton dropped his demand for records.

Paxton sued to block Title IX guidelines which included sexual orientation and gender identity as prohibited discrimination in education. Judge Reed O'Connor blocked the guidance.

Paxton sued to block a rule that required states to provide LGBTQ+ affirming placement for foster care youth. Judge Jeremy Kernodle blocked the rule. He also sued a doctor who provided gender-affirming treatment under SB 14.

In December 2024, Paxton sued the NCAA, arguing that allowing trans women to compete in women's sporting events was "false, deceptive, and misleading" to attendees.

Paxton sued the Equal Employment Opportunity Commission over guidance providing protections for transgender employees. In 2025, Judge Matthew Kacsmaryk struck down the guidance.

In October 2025, following the assassination of Charlie Kirk, Paxton's office put out an official statement in which he was quoted saying "Corrupted ideologies like transgenderism and Antifa are a cancer on our culture and have unleashed their deranged and drugged-up foot soldiers on the American people" and went on to say that he would be having law enforcement pursue and infiltrate "these leftist terror cells".

=== Second Amendment lawsuits ===
In 2016, three University of Texas at Austin professors sued in an effort to ban concealed handguns from campus, blocking the state's campus carry law. Paxton called the lawsuit "frivolous" and moved to dismiss. The federal district court dismissed the suit in 2017, and the dismissal was upheld by a three-judge panel of the 5th Circuit Court of Appeals in 2018.

In 2016, Paxton sued the City of Austin to allow license holders to openly carry handguns in Austin City Hall. Paxton prevailed, and the court decided not only that the city of Austin must allow such carry, but also ordered it to pay a fine to the state for each day it prevented investigators from the attorney general's office from carrying their firearms.

=== Voting rights ===
In March 2017, Paxton told The Washington Times that he was convinced that voter fraud exists in Texas, and claimed that local election officials in Texas were not on the lookout for fraud. According to a July 11, 2021, article in The New York Times, even though voter fraud is "very rare in the United States"—most cases are minor errors on the part of a voter—Paxton "made it a mission" as attorney general to file voter-fraud charge. According to a July 9, 2021, article in The Guardian, "[F]ew prosecutors have pursued election-related crimes more than Paxton."

By February 2017—as part of his "crusade" against voter fraud—Paxton sought to investigate 2016 Texas voting records—such as access to individual voting history and application materials for voter registrations—to uncover potential voter fraud, for example, voting by non-citizens or in the name of the deceased. In February 2017, officials in Bexar County said there have been no major cases of voter fraud in San Antonio. The Associated Press reported that hundreds of people were allowed to bypass the state's voter ID laws and improperly cast ballots by submitting an affidavit instead of presenting a photo ID, even though they possessed a valid ID. The top election official in Bexar County estimates that 'a large chunk' of the nearly six hundred affidavits submitted should have been declined, and the voter should have been required to cast a provisional ballot. Of the roughly 13,500 affidavits from the largest Texas counties that AP analyzed, they found at least 500 instances of improper voting. However, Fort Bend County's top elections official said that these cases are not voter fraud, noting that only those who were registered to vote qualified for an affidavit, and that "poll workers were trained to 'err on the side of letting people use the affidavit instead of denying them the chance to vote.'" According to a May 2, 2017 ProPublica article, there was no evidence of widespread voter fraud in Texas. In 2017, the Texas Tribune reported that experts had said there was no reliable evidence of widespread voter fraud in the United States, and a Texas study of elections over a decade determined that there were about three cases of fraud for every one million votes in the state.

In 2017, the San Antonio Express-News criticized the state's voter identification law, which Paxton seeks to have reinstated after it was struck down by United States District Judge Nelva Gonzales Ramos, who found the measure to be a violation of the Voting Rights Act, and found that it was passed with the intent to discriminate against Black and Hispanic voters. Paxton's office appealed the decision. Appeals continue in the case. By May 2017, the Office of the Attorney General's "efforts to enact and enforce the strictest voter ID law in the nation were so plagued by delays, revisions, court interventions and inadequate education that the casting of ballots in the 2016 election was inevitably troubled".

==== Prioritizing voter-fraud prosecutions ====
Of the voter fraud cases that Paxton's office chose to pursue, 72% were people of color. Among them was Hervis Rogers, a Black man working two jobs who had been waiting six hours in a line at Houston's Texas Southern University in Harris County, Texas, to vote in the March 2020 Democratic presidential primary election, and had been praised for his tenacity in exercising his right to vote. In Texas, it is a second-degree felony for a person on parole or probation to knowingly vote. Rogers had served a nine-year prison sentence for a burglary conviction in 1995; he was released on parole in 2004, and his parole ended in June 2020. In July 2021, Paxton ordered Rogers' arrest. Rogers said he was not aware that he had been ineligible to vote. Bail for Rogers was set at $100,000, which he could not afford. Hervis was not charged in Harris County (which is majority-minority), but rather was charged in the adjacent Montgomery County, where only 4% of the population is Black. The Bail Project, a non-profit, ultimately posted bail for Rogers, and he was defended in the case by the ACLU of Texas. The charges against Rogers were dismissed in 2022, after the Texas Court of Criminal Appeals ruled that Paxton had no authority to unilaterally charge Texans with election crimes.

The Rogers case was not the first time that Paxton had indulged in "forum shopping". He tried to get a Harris County elections official indicted and tried for alleged interference with a poll watcher, attempting to obtain that indictment in Montgomery County.

Few Texans charged by Paxton's office served time for voter fraud. An analysis by KXAN found that 24 of 138 people convicted of voter fraud in Texas between 2004 and September 2020 spent time in jail. Paxton acknowledged that a few defendants served prison time but defended his approach as a way to "send a message". Paxton's office spent almost double the time working on voter fraud cases in 2021 as it did in 2018. It recorded spending over 22,000 staff hours on the task, but resolved only 16 prosecutions, half as many as two years prior. All of the cases were in Harris County, lodged against voters who had provided inaccurate addresses on their voter registration forms. None of those defendants were sentenced to jail time. The costs of the 230 ongoing investigations and 360 prosecutions were formidable: The chief of election fraud is paid about $140,000, a second attorney received $97,000. Two other attorneys were each being paid about $85,000.

Paxton's voter fraud investigation unit had a budget of $1.9 million to $2.2 million in 2021. By the end of the year, the office had closed only three cases of fraud.

In 2024, Paxton's "voter integrity unit" raided the offices of Latino voting activists, seizing cellphones, computers and documents as part of a voter fraud inquiry. The League of United Latin American Citizens described the raids as an attempt to suppress Latino voters.

==== Challenge to 2020 presidential election results ====
Paxton's office spent more than 22,000 hours looking for voter fraud after the 2020 election, finding only 16 cases of false addresses on registration forms out of nearly 17 million registered voters.

On December 8, 2020, Paxton sued the states of Georgia, Michigan, Wisconsin, and Pennsylvania, where certified results showed President-elect Joe Biden the victor over President Donald Trump, alleging a variety of unconstitutional actions in their presidential balloting, arguments that had already been rejected in other courts. In Texas v. Pennsylvania, Paxton asked the United States Supreme Court to invalidate the states' sixty-two electoral votes, allowing Trump to be declared the winner of a second presidential term. Because the suit was cast as a dispute between states, the Supreme Court had original jurisdiction, although it often declines to hear such suits. There is no evidence of widespread illegal voting in the election. Paxton's lawsuit included claims that had been tried unsuccessfully in other courts and shown to be false. Officials from the four states described Paxton's lawsuit as recycling false and disproven claims of irregularity. Trump and seventeen Republican state attorneys general filed motions to support the case, the merits of which were sharply criticized by legal experts and politicians. Election law expert Rick Hasen described the lawsuit as "the dumbest case I've ever seen filed on an emergency basis at the Supreme Court". Republican senator Ben Sasse opined that the situation of Paxton initiating the lawsuit "looks like a fella begging for a pardon filed a PR stunt", in reference to Paxton's own legal issues (securities fraud charges and abuse of office allegations). Paxton has called the pardon speculation "an absurdly laughable conspiracy theory" and said the lawsuit is about election integrity. The case was quickly dismissed on December 11.

Later it was revealed that the failed suit had been drafted by Lawyers for Trump, a group connected to the Trump campaign. Several other state attorneys general turned down the offer to file the suit. Solicitor General of Texas Kyle D. Hawkins, who would ordinarily represent the state in cases before the Supreme Court, refused to let his name be attached to the suit. The Texas attorney general hired Lawrence J. Joseph of Lawyers for Trump as special counsel for filing the suit.

After the failure of his lawsuit, Paxton traveled to Washington to speak at a political rally for President Trump on January 6, 2021. In his speech, Paxton told the crowd "we will not quit fighting". Immediately following, the crowd of Trump supporters left the rally and stormed the United States Capitol building in a riot that led to the death of five people, including a police officer. In reaction to the violence and loss of life, Paxton falsely claimed that the rioters were liberal activists posing as Trump supporters. He was the only state attorney general to not condemn the insurrection.

In early 2021, Paxton's office refused to provide his work emails and text messages he sent or received while in Washington on January 6, after several Texas news organizations requested them in accordance with the state's open records law. In January 2022, the Travis County district attorney gave Paxton four days to comply or face a lawsuit.

In October 2021, Paxton falsely claimed that Biden "overthrew" Trump in the 2020 election.

==== Gerrymandering ====
Paxton defended Texas in a federal lawsuit involving allegations that Texas's congressional districts were gerrymandered. In 2017, a three-judge panel of a U.S. federal court based in San Antonio ruled that the Republican-controlled Texas Legislature drew congressional-district to discriminate against minority voters, and ordered the redrawing of Texas's 35th and 27th congressional districts. Paxton appealed the ruling, contending that the previous maps were lawful, and vowed to "aggressively defend the maps on all fronts"; U.S. representative Lloyd Doggett criticized the appeal as a "desperate, highly questionable Paxton-Abbott maneuver" coming "after yet another ruling against the state of Texas for intentional discrimination". Texas won on appeal when in a 5–4 decision the Supreme Court ruled there was insufficient evidence to prove that state Republicans acted in bad faith and engaged in intentional discrimination with respect to the 27th and 35th congressional districts.

Paxton sued Beto O'Rourke for fundraising walkouts of the 2025 redistricting.

=== Religion in schools ===
Paxton "has often criticized what he calls anti-Christian discrimination in Texas schools". In 2015, Paxton opposed an atheist group's legal action seeking a halt to the reading of religious prayers before school board meetings. In December 2016, Paxton gained attention after intervening in a dispute in Killeen, Texas, in which a middle school principal told a nurse's aide to take down a six-foot poster in the school containing a quote from Christian scripture. Paxton sided with the aide, who won in court.

In September 2025, Paxton published a press release stating "Our nation was founded on the rock of Biblical Truth," and that "Twisted, radical liberals want to erase Truth". He encouraged students in Texas classrooms to recite "the Lord's Prayer, as taught by Jesus Christ".

In early 2017, Paxton objected to a Texas school's use of an empty classroom to allow its Muslim students to pray, issuing a press release that claimed that "the high school's prayer room is ... apparently excluding students of other faiths." School officials said that Paxton had never asked them about this assertion, and that the room was a spare room used by faculty and non-Muslim students as well as for multiple activities, from grading papers to Buddhist meditation. The Frisco Independent School District superintendent, in a letter sent in response to Paxton, called his press release "a publicity stunt by the [Office of Attorney General] to politicize a nonissue".

=== Sports betting ===
In 2016, Paxton had issued an opinion concluding that paid daily fantasy sports contests likely constituted illegal gambling under Texas law.

In September 2026, Politico reported that Paxton had not joined multistate legal efforts to regulate Kalshi, a prediction market platform. The report noted that Paxton and a political action committee supporting him had received thousands of dollars in donations from Kalshi and its chief executive. Paxton's campaign declined to comment.

== Legal issues ==
=== State securities fraud felony indictment ===
On July 28, 2015, a state grand jury indicted Paxton on three criminal charges: two counts of securities fraud (a first-degree felony) and one count of failing to register with state securities regulators (a third-degree felony). Paxton's indictment marked the first such criminal indictment of a Texas attorney general in thirty-two years since Texas attorney general Jim Mattox was indicted for bribery in 1983. The complainants in the case are Joel Hochberg, a Florida businessman, and Byron Cook, a Republican and former member of the Texas House of Representatives. Paxton and Cook were former friends and roommates while serving together in the Texas House. Three special prosecutors were trying the state's case.

The state prosecution against Paxton grew out of Paxton's selling of shares of Servergy Inc., a technology company, to investors in 2011. Prosecutors alleged that Paxton sold shares of Servergy to investors (raising $840,000) while failing to disclose that he was receiving compensation from the company in the form of 100,000 shares of stock in return. Paxton says the 100,000 shares of stock he received from Servergy's founder and CEO were a gift and not a sales commission and that they were given to Paxton long before the sales transactions occurred.

On August 3, 2015, after the unsealing of the grand jury indictment, Paxton was arrested and booked. He pleaded not guilty and portrayed "the case against him as a political witch-hunt". Paxton and his supporters claim that the prosecution has its origin in a dispute among Texas Republicans—with conservatives like Paxton on one side and moderates like Cook on the other—and suggest that Cook's complaint, several years after the Servergy deal, was political payback.

Paxton unsuccessfully sought to quash the indictments. This challenge was rejected by the trial judge, the Fifth Court of Appeals, and the Court of Criminal Appeals, Texas's criminal court of last resort.

Paxton's trial was delayed multiple times over side issues, such as the venue where the trial would take place and the amount of the special prosecutors' fees. In March 2017, District Judge George Gallagher, a Republican from Fort Worth, granted the prosecution's motion for a change of venue, moving the trial to Houston in Harris County. Gallagher also denied Paxton's motion to dismiss one of the charges against him because of issues that arose about the grand jury. In May 2017, the Fifth Court of Appeals of Texas agreed with Paxton that the transfer of Paxton's trial to Houston required assignment of the case to a new judge to replace Judge Gallagher, and all orders issued by Judge Gallagher after the change of venue were voided.

In November 2018, the Texas Court of Criminal Appeals invalidated the trial court's order approving of payments of attorneys' fees to the special prosecutors in the case and directed the lower court to issue payments "in accordance with an approved fee schedule", siding with county commissioners in Paxton's home county of Collin County, who had rejected the prosecutors' invoice. The special prosecutors in the case have suggested that if they are not paid, they could withdraw from prosecution of Paxton. After the Texas Court of Criminal Appeals declined to reconsider the motion, one of three prosecutors pursuing criminal charges against Paxton asked to step down from the case.

Paxton filed a motion to move the case from Harris County to his native Collin County in 2019. The trial court granted the motion, and in rulings in 2021, the 1st Court of Appeals in Houston agreed. However, in June 2023, the Texas Court of Criminal Appeals sided with the prosecution, overturning the lower courts' rulings and holding 6–3 that the securities fraud case against Paxton should stay in Harris County.

In October 2023, the Harris County District Court scheduled Paxton's trial to begin April 15, 2024.

On March 26, 2024, Paxton reached an agreement with the special prosecutor's office to allow him to avoid trial. Under the agreement, Paxton agreed to pay $300,000 in restitution, perform 200 hours of community service, and take 15 hours of legal ethics training. Under the agreement, Paxton was not required to admit wrongdoing in the case. After completion of the terms of the agreement, the case was dismissed on June 18, 2025.

=== Securities and Exchange Commission civil action ===
In 2016, the U.S. Securities and Exchange Commission (SEC) filed a civil enforcement action against Paxton in the United States District Court for the Eastern District of Texas. The SEC's complaint specifically charged Paxton with violating various provisions of the Securities Act of 1933 and various provisions (including Rule 10b-5) of the Securities Exchange Act of 1934 by defrauding the Servergy investors. Paxton denied the allegations. One of the defendants and Servergy itself reached a separate settlement with the SEC, agreeing to pay $260,000 in penalties.

In October 2016, U.S. district judge Amos L. Mazzant III conditionally dismissed the complaint, finding the SEC had not alleged Paxton had any legal obligation to inform investors that he was receiving a commission, but gave the SEC two weeks to refile an amended complaint. The SEC refiled its securities fraud claims against Paxton, making the additional allegations that Paxton and Cook's investment club required all of its members to accept the same risks on all investments and that it specifically forbade members from making money off investments of other members. The SEC further alleged that Paxton did not properly disclose his Servergy ownership stake on his taxes and that he attempted to conceal the stake by at different times claiming it was his fee for legal services, that it was a gift, and that he had only received it after investing money.

In March 2017, Mazzant dismissed the civil securities fraud case, ruling that Paxton had "no plausible legal duty" to inform investors that he would earn a commission if they purchased stock in a technical company that Paxton represented. With the second dismissal of the case with prejudice, the SEC could not bring new action on the same claim against Paxton. The dismissal of the SEC case did not have a direct impact on the state criminal case.

=== Whistleblower allegations ===
In October 2020, seven of Paxton's top aides published a letter to the office's director of human resources, accusing Paxton of improper influence, abuse of office, bribery and other crimes, and said they had provided information to law enforcement and asked them to investigate. The letter was signed by first assistant attorney general Jeff Mateer, and the deputy and deputy attorneys general overseeing the office's divisions for criminal investigations, civil litigation, administration, and policy. Paxton denied misconduct and said he would not resign. By the end of the month, all seven whistleblowers had left the office: three resigned, two were fired, and two were put on leave.

The allegations included that Paxton illegally used his office to benefit real estate developer Nate Paul, who had donated $25,000 to Paxton's 2018 campaign, and that Paxton advocated that Paul's company, World Class, hire a woman with whom Paxton had had an extramarital affair. Paul acknowledged employing the woman but denied that he had done so on Paxton's behalf.

In 2020, four of the former members of the attorney general's office sued their former employer, alleging that Paxton fired them for reporting misconduct to law enforcement, a form of illegal retaliation under the state's Whistleblower Act. The four ex-employees—who had served as Paxton's deputy attorney general for legal counsel, deputy attorney general for criminal justice; deputy attorney general, and director of the law enforcement division—were fired several weeks after bringing their concerns to the FBI and Texas Rangers. In 2021, the district court denied Paxton's motion to dismiss the suit. Paxton claimed that the Whistleblower Act did not apply to allegations of misconduct by elected executive officials such as himself, and that as an elected official he must have the power to control his top lieutenants, who are high-level political appointees, but in October 2021, the Texas Third Court of Appeals rejected his appeal, affirming the trial court's order.

In early February 2023, following mediation, Paxton agreed to a tentative settlement in which the whistleblowers would be paid $3.3 million. Under the settlement agreement, neither side admitted fault or liability, but Paxton "accept[ed] that plaintiffs acted in a manner that they thought was right and apologizes for referring to them as 'rogue employees.' " The settlement was contingent on securing "necessary approvals for funding" from the state. Paxton then asked the state to use taxpayer funds to pay the settlement. The legislature did not approve the settlement in the 2023 session. The accusations raised by the whistleblowers—that Paxton abused power to assist a wealthy donor in exchange for possible benefits, specifically a home remodel—later led to his impeachment by the Texas House of Representatives in May 2023.

Because a May 2023 deadline passed without payment, the settlement did not come into effect. The suit moved to the Texas Supreme Court, which ruled in September 2023 that the attorney general is subject to the Whistleblower Act. On April 5, 2025, Travis County district court judge Catherine Mauzy awarded $6.6 million combined to four whistleblowers.

Also in February 2023, the U.S. Justice Department's Public Integrity Section in Washington assumed an investigation of Paxton that had previously been managed by federal prosecutors in Texas.

=== State bar professional misconduct lawsuit against Paxton ===
After Paxton sought to overturn the 2020 presidential election to keep Trump in power, Galveston Democrats filed a complaint against Paxton with the State Bar of Texas, alleging that Paxton engaged in professional misconduct by raising a frivolous and unethical challenge. The bar's chief disciplinary counsel initially dismissed the complaint, but in May 2021, that decision was reversed by the Board of Disciplinary Appeals, which found "that the grievance alleges a possible violation" of the Texas Disciplinary Rules of Professional Misconduct and ordered the Bar to investigate. Similar ethics complaints against Paxton, seeking disbarment or other sanctions against him, were filed by various others, including Lawyers Defending American Democracy, whose complaint was signed by four former presidents of the State Bar of Texas and a former chair of the Texas Supreme Court grievance oversight committee.

In May 2022, the Bar's Commission for Lawyer Discipline sued Paxton in Collin County District Court, asking the court to find that Paxton had acted unethically in seeking to subvert the 2020 presidential election and to impose a sanction ranging from a private reprimand to disbarment. The Bar's filing said that Paxton had made numerous specific "dishonest" representations in his attempt to challenge the election results. In response to the ethics lawsuit against him, Paxton claimed that the bar was controlled by "leftists" and opened his own investigation into the Texas Bar Foundation (which is separate from the State Bar of Texas). He also banned Texas AG's office employees from speaking at any state bar events. The district court denied Paxton's motion to dismiss the ethics complaint against him. Paxton appealed to the Texas Fifth Court of Appeals; he argued that, as Attorney General, he was immune to any discipline by the State Bar of Texas for filing lawsuits based on bogus factual claims.

In August 2023, a week before Paxton's impeachment trial started in the state Senate, fourteen lawyers filed a complaint with the state bar, seeking to prevent Paxton from practicing law. James Harrington authored the complaint, which accuses Paxton of abuse of office and other misconduct, including bribery and organized crime. Three former State Bar of Texas presidents co-signed the complaint.

On January 23, 2025, the Commission dropped its suit because the state's Supreme Court had already ruled in the commission's nearly identical suit against Brent Webster that the state's judiciary lacked jurisdiction over executive branch pleadings due to separation of powers concerns, and the suit against Paxton ran up against the same issue. As the court's finding was jurisdictional, it did not rule on whether Paxton or Webster had engaged in professional misconduct or acted unethically, and there have been no additional updates from the bar association since.

=== Alleged voter fraud ===
In 2025 and 2026, Paxton voted using a registration address where he reportedly did not live. He voted in Collin County at his ex-wife's address, while he had reportedly moved to Denton County after their divorce. The Texas attorney general’s office provided a legal warning that "You must register to vote using the address where you reside."

== Personal life ==
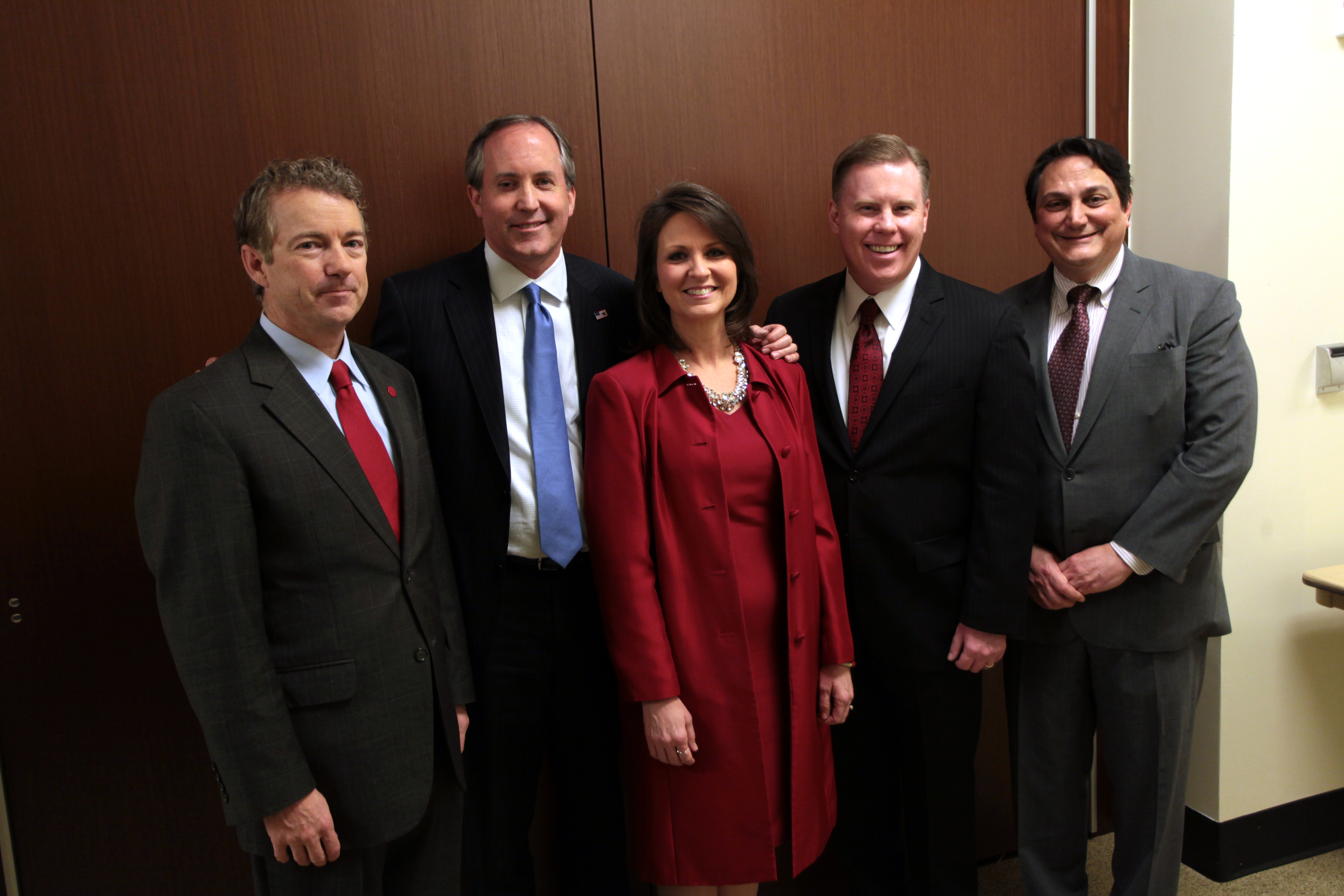
Paxton with his ex-wife Angela, Senator Rand Paul and others

Paxton married Angela Paxton (née Allen) in 1986. They have four children and five grandchildren. The Paxtons lived in Collin County. Later, in the 1990s, they were founding members of Stonebriar Community Church, in Frisco, Texas.

Paxton has a reported net worth of nearly $8 million, including residential properties in Texas, Oklahoma, Florida, Utah, and Hawaii. His reported net worth increased from less than $200,000 when he first took office, and some assets were held in a blind trust that later raised ethics disclosure questions. Paxton claimed three homes in Dallas and Austin as primary residences on mortgages, which allowed him to "improperly lock in low interest rates"; he also claimed homestead tax exemptions on two homes at the same time.

=== Swatting incident ===
On January 1, 2024, the Paxtons said their home had been subject to a prank police report—a crime known as swatting—while they were not home. Police confirmed they had been called. They also said their home address had been improperly released (doxxed). The incident occurred during the 2023 swatting of American politicians when public servants and politicians around the United States were reporting swatting incidents.

=== Estrangement, affair, divorce ===
Ken Paxton was reportedly estranged from Angela Paxton. In September 2018, while holding hands with his wife Angela, Ken Paxton "gathered his staff to make a fateful confession... an extramarital affair. He said it was over and swore to recommit to his marriage". The Texas Tribune source reports that the affair nevertheless continued for several years.

Beginning in August 2020, Paxton visited the unnamed woman at her Austin apartment a dozen times, and a personal aide to Attorney General (AG) Paxton "told House investigators that he saw the [AG] and the woman" at a resort and spa.

The allegations were made the more serious by the accusation that the affair was facilitated by friend, donor, and Austin real estate investor Nate Paul. Paul was alleged to have hired the "girlfriend" with whom Paxton was having the affair, and facilitated her move to Austin and Paxton's clandestine meetings with her. The managers of Paxton's failed state impeachment effort contended these were abuses "in exchange for his office... help[ing] Paul ’s faltering businesses..., looming bankruptcies[,] and a litany of related lawsuits". Impeachment managers also contended that Paxton and Paul shared an Uber account under a pseudonym to help Paxton meet with the woman. In September 2023, the impeachment trial concluded in the Texas Senate with a vote short of the 21 needed to impeach, and so in his acquittal by a largely party-line vote, 16–14 (two Republicans voting with the minority), thus allowing Paxton to resume his AG duties.

On July 10, 2025, Angela posted on X that she had "filed for divorce on biblical grounds". The court filing alleged Ken Paxton was at fault and had a history of serial adultery, and that the couple had not lived together since June 2024. The divorce was finalized in November 2026.

== Notes ==
Party political offices
Preceded by Greg Abbott	Republican nominee for Attorney General of Texas; 2014, 2018, 2022	Succeeded by Mayes Middleton
Preceded by John Cornyn	Republican nominee for U.S. Senator from Texas (Class 2); 2026	Most recent
Legal offices
Preceded by Greg Abbott	Attorney General of Texas; 2015–present Suspended: 2023	Next: Nathan M. Johnson; Elect
