= Robert Howden (politician) =

American politician

116th Secretary of State of Texas
- Incumbent
- Assumed office July 18, 2026
- Governor: Greg Abbott
- Preceded by: Jane Nelson

Personal details
- Born: Robert Spence Howden
- Party: Republican
- Spouse: Jana
- Children: 3
- Education: University of Texas at Austin (BS)
- Website: Official website

Robert Spence Howden is an American politician serving as acting secretary of state of Texas since July 2026. He previously served as a senior advisor to governor Greg Abbott and as his director of legislative affairs.

== Early life and career ==
Howden graduated from the University of Texas at Austin, where he was a member of the Pi Kappa Alpha fraternity, with a Bachelor of Science in advertising in December 1983. He worked as an aide to governor Rick Perry, but left state government to join the Texas Automobile Dealers Association.

== Personal life ==
Howden is married to Jana Howden, who was appointed to Texas Department of Transportation Motor Vehicle Board by his former boss Rick Perry in 2004.

Political offices
| Preceded by Jane Nelson | Secretary of State of Texas; Acting; 2026–present | Incumbent |
