= Vista Bank (Dallas) =

Bank in Texas

- Industry: Banking
- Founded: 1912; 114 years ago
- Headquarters: Dallas, Texas
- Area served: Texas
- Key people: John D. Steinmetz (President & CEO); Auden Herrera (COO); Robert Bruce (CFO); Jared Craighead (Chief of Staff); Cathy Landtroop (CCO)
- Total assets: $1.3 billion
- Owner: National Bank Holdings Corporation
- Website: www.vistabank.com

Vista Bank is an American bank founded in 1912 that operates twelve branches throughout Texas. Based in Dallas, Texas, this subsidiary of Vista Bancshares ended Q4 2020 with $1.3 billion in assets.

Participant in Rounds One and Two of the Paycheck Protection Program (PPP) during the COVID-19 pandemic, it implemented the Main Street Lending Program to small and middle market Texas companies seeking funding. Vista was one of the top 25 funders to North Texas small businesses.

On January 7, 2026, National Bank Holdings Corporation announced that it had completed its acquisition of Vista Bancshares and Vista Bank.

== History ==
In 2007, John D. Steinmetz began working for Vista Bank and eventually became the bank's chief executive. He became the first person outside of the founding family to lead the institution and helped expand the bank's operations in Florida and throughout Texas.

Throughout the COVID-19 pandemic, Steinmetz oversaw Vista Bank's involvement with the federal Paycheck Protection Program (PPP). Vista Bank became one of the initial 13 banks in Texas to join the U.S. Federal Reserve's Main Street Lending Program.

A merger agreement between Vista Bank and National Bank Holdings Corporation was announced in September 2025. Once the acquisition officially closed in January 2026, Steinmetz became NBH Bank's Executive Managing Director and Executive Vice Chair.

== Services ==
A member of Federal Deposit Insurance Corporation (FDIC) and an Equal Housing Lender, Vista Bank conducts commercial and personal banking across the state of Texas. The bank's website states that they provide:

- Commercial lending
- Treasury management
- Small business banking
- Private banking
- Consumer banking
