= Green Party of Texas =

Texas affiliate of the Green Party

- Co-chairs: Matt Bauman; Aly Schmidt
- Senate Leader: None
- House Leader: None
- Founded: 1999; 27 years ago
- Headquarters: San Antonio, Texas
- Ideology: Green politics
- Political position: Left-wing
- National affiliation: Green Party
- Colors: Green
- Texas Senate: 0 / 31
- Texas House of Representatives: 0 / 150
- Statewide executive officers: 0 / 9

Website
- Official website

The Green Party of Texas (GPTX) is the state party organization for Texas of the Green Party of the United States (GPUS). The party espouses green politics, advocating for grassroots democracy, social justice, ecological preservation, and nonviolence.

The party was founded in 1999 to promote GPUS presidential candidates and organize third-party campaigns for state and local races. The party has historically been the state's fourth-most voted political party, behind the Republican Party of Texas, the Texas Democratic Party, and the Libertarian Party of Texas. Like its parent party, GPTX has been criticized for weakening the state's Democratic party via the spoiler effect.

Under Texas state law, third parties automatically obtain ballot access if any statewide candidate received at least 2% of the vote in their race in any of the previous five general elections. The Green Party of Texas currently holds ballot access through 2034, having earned 2.75% of the vote in the 2024 election for the Texas Railroad Commission. The party does not hold primary elections, instead utilizing county, district, and state conventions to nominate candidates.

== History ==
=== Pre-2000 ===
While green politics groups had existed in Texas's largest cities for some time, the movement for a statewide party was spurred by Ralph Nader's 1996 presidential campaign. Nader ran a write-in campaign in the state, finishing in sixth place with 4,810 votes.

The first Green to run in the state was Karen Hadden, who placed third in a 1997 nonpartisan race for Austin City Council. The following year, Susan Lee Solar ran a write-in campaign in the governor's race, finishing in last place with 954 votes.

=== 2000 ===
In 2000, the party ran a petition drive to obtain ballot access. For parties without existing ballot access, Texas state law requires a number of signatures greater than 1% of all votes in the previous gubernatorial election; in 2000, this requirement was 37,280 signatures. The Green Party submitted approximately 74,000 signatures, thus securing ballot access for both Ralph Nader's 2000 presidential campaign and the state party's candidates. The petition drive cost about $80,000.

Alongside Nader, the party ran four statewide candidates in 2000: Douglas Sandage for U.S. Senate, Gary Dugger and Charles Mauch for the Railroad Commission, and Ben Levy for the Supreme Court of Texas. To retain ballot access in 2002, the party needed to obtain at least 5% of the vote in any of the statewide races. Dugger, Mauch, and Levy, who ran in races where the Texas Democratic Party did not field a candidate, surpassed this threshold with 7.2–9.7% of the vote.

=== 2002 ===
Having achieved ballot access in 2000, the Green Party fielded 40 candidates in 2002, including for U.S. Senate, all statewide executive offices, three statewide judicial seats, eight U.S. House seats, seven Texas House seats, and two seats on the State Board of Education. Four of the party's candidates were endorsed by The Austin Chronicle.

The party failed to retain ballot access, as unlike in 2000, the Texas Democratic Party ran candidates in all statewide races. The party's best statewide result was Brad Rockwell, a candidate for the Supreme Court of Texas, who won 1.76% of the vote, well below the 5% threshold. However, the party also achieved its first ever win, with George Rice winning a seat on the nonpartisan board of directors for the Edwards Aquifer Authority.

=== 2004–2008 ===
In 2004, the party attempted an all-volunteer petition drive to regain ballot access, but it fell short of the 45,540-signature requirement. Presidential candidate David Cobb ran a write-in campaign in the state, finishing in sixth place with 1,014 votes.

In 2006, twenty-two candidates sought nomination at the party's convention. However, another petition drive failed, with only about 27,000 signatures gathered out of 45,540 required, which prevented the candidates from gaining ballot access. One Green candidate, Charles Waterbury, would ultimately run for a seat on the Supreme Court of Texas as a write-in candidate; he finished in last place with 8,045 votes.

In 2008, a third petition drive for ballot access failed. Presidential candidate Cynthia McKinney ran a write-in campaign in the state, finishing in sixth place with 909 votes.

=== 2010 ===
In 2010, the party successfully petitioned for ballot access with 92,000 signatures, surpassing the 43,992-signature requirement. The petition drive was funded with $532,000 from Take Initiative America, a nonprofit with ties to the Republican Party, in an alleged coordinated campaign with Republican governor Rick Perry's re-election campaign. The Texas Democratic Party sued to remove the Green Party from the ballot, alleging that the funding constituted an illegal donation. A judge ordered the Green Party to be removed from the ballot, but a partial stay by the Supreme Court of Texas reversed this decision, and the party remained on the ballot in 2010. The lawsuit was quietly settled in 2012.

In the election, the Green Party fielded 14 candidates, including four statewide executive offices, two U.S. House seats, two Texas House seats, and one seat on the State Board of Education. In the race for Comptroller, where there was no Democratic candidate, Green candidate Edward Lindsay won 6.34% of the vote, retaining ballot access in 2012.

=== 2012–2015 ===
The Green Party fielded a record 42 candidates in the 2012 election, including Presidential candidate Jill Stein, thirteen U.S. House seats, two Railroad Commission seats, two Supreme Court seats, two Texas Senate seats, thirteen Texas House seats, and two State Board of Education seats. Two statewide Green candidates surpassed the 5% threshold necessary to retain ballot access in 2014; both ran in races where there was no Democratic candidate.

The party fielded 43 candidates in the 2014 election, including candidates for U.S. Senate, eight U.S. House seats, all statewide executive races, four statewide judicial races, two Texas Senate seats, and six Texas House seats. Three statewide Green candidates surpassed the 5% threshold necessary to retain ballot access in 2016; all three ran in races where there was no Democratic candidate. The party achieved its best result ever in a statewide race, with Court of Criminal Appeals candidate Judith Sanders-Castro earning 10.44% of the vote. It also achieved its best result ever in a partisan race, with Webb County commission candidate Erika Martinez earning 42.8% of the vote against Democrat Frank Sciaraffa.

In 2015, Green candidate George Altgelt won a special election to Laredo city council, taking 58.2% of the vote in a runoff.

=== 2016–2018 ===
The Green Party fielded 43 candidates in the 2016 election, including Presidential candidate Jill Stein, seventeen U.S. House seats, a Railroad Commission seat, five statewide judicial seats, a Texas Senate seat, six Texas House seats, and a State Board of Education seat. The party hosted the 2016 Green National Convention in Houston.

The party failed to retain ballot access, as the Texas Democratic Party ran candidates in all statewide races. Its best statewide result was for Martina Salinas, the party's candidate for the Railroad Commission, who won only 3.28% of the vote. The party attempted a petition drive in 2018 to regain ballot access, but it failed to reach the 47,183-signature threshold.

=== 2020–present ===
In 2019, the Republican-controlled Texas Legislature passed HB 2504, which substantially reduced the threshold required for parties to qualify for the ballot from 5% in the previous election to 2% in any of the previous five elections. This retroactively returned ballot access to the Green Party, which had exceeded that threshold in 2016, until 2026. Observers viewed the bill as aiming to boost the Green Party, which would in turn weaken the Democratic Party through the spoiler effect.

In the 2020 election, the Green Party fielded 10 candidates, including Presidential candidate Howie Hawkins, U.S. Senate, two U.S. House seats, a Railroad Commission seat, a Texas Senate seat, and three Texas House seats. The party's best-performing statewide candidate was Kat Gruene, the party's candidate for the Railroad Commission, who won 1.18% of the vote.

In the 2022 election, the party fielded candidates for governor, land commissioner, and a Railroad Commission seat. The party's best-performing statewide candidate was Alfred Molison, the party's candidate for Land Commissioner, who won 1.67% of the vote.

In the 2024 election, the party fielded 4 candidates, including Presidential candidate Jill Stein, a Railroad Commission seat, a Texas Senate seat, and a State Board of Education seat. Railroad Commissioner candidate Eddie Espinoza won 2.75% of the vote, extending the party's ballot access through 2034.

In the 2026 election, the party fielded 12 candidates, including for five U.S. House seats, lieutenant governor, comptroller, one Texas Senate seat, and two Texas House seats. The party's best-performing statewide candidate was Kevin McCormick, the party's candidate for Lieutenant Governor, who won 0.90% of the vote. Green member Kris Cox narrowly advanced to a December runoff in a nonpartisan Denton city council race with 20.75% of the vote.

== Elected officials ==
The Green Party of the United States's elections database does not list any current Texas officeholders who are affiliated with the party.

=== Former ===
The Green Party of the United States's elections database lists six officeholders who were affiliated with the party at the time of their election. All six were elected to local government positions in non-partisan elections.

Candidate	Jurisdiction	Office	District	Election	Votes	%	Notes	Ref.
George Rice	Edwards Aquifer Authority	Board of Directors	3	2002	12,290	55.9%	Non-partisan position Lost re-election in 2010	
George Rice	Edwards Aquifer Authority	Board of Directors	3	2006	No opponent		Non-partisan position Lost re-election in 2010	
David Lanman	Marfa	Mayor	At-Large	2005	No opponent		Non-partisan position	
Bob Brewer	Alpine	City Council	5	2005	Appointed		Non-partisan position Unsuccessfully ran for the seat earlier in the year	
Enrique Valdivia	Edwards Aquifer Authority	Board of Directors	7A	2006	10,741	56.3%	Non-partisan position No longer affiliated with the party (Note: Valdivia's campaigns after 2010 are not listed in the GPUS database)	
Enrique Valdivia	Edwards Aquifer Authority	Board of Directors	7A	2010	No opponent		Non-partisan position No longer affiliated with the party	
Debbie Russell	Del Valle ISD	Board of Trustees	2	2012	No opponent		Non-partisan position	
Debbie Russell	Del Valle ISD	Board of Trustees	2	2016	No opponent		Non-partisan position	
George Altgelt	Laredo	City Council	7	2015 (Note: special election)	292	29.8%	Non-partisan position	
George Altgelt	Laredo	City Council	7	2015 (runoff)	935	58.2%	Non-partisan position	
George Altgelt	Laredo	City Council	7	2016	3,645	59.5%	Non-partisan position	

== Election results ==
=== U.S. President ===
Year	Nominee	Votes	%	Place	Ref.
1996	Ralph Nader; Winona LaDuke (write-in)	4,810	0.09%	6th	
2000	Ralph Nader; Winona LaDuke	137,994	2.15%	3rd	
2004	David Cobb; Pat LaMarche (write-in)	1,014	0.01%	6th	
2008	Cynthia McKinney; Rosa Clemente (write-in)	909	0.01%	6th	
2012	Jill Stein; Cheri Honkala	24,657	0.31%	4th	
2016	Jill Stein; Ajamu Baraka	71,558	0.80%	4th	
2020	Howie Hawkins; Angela Walker	33,396	0.30%	4th	
2024	Jill Stein; Butch Ware	82,701	0.73%	3rd	

=== Statewide races ===
==== U.S. Senate ====
Year	Candidate	Votes	%	Place	Ref.
2000	Douglas Sandage	91,448	1.46%	3rd	
2002	Roy H. Williams	25,051	0.55%	4th	
2012	David B. Collins	67,404	0.86%	4th	
2014	Emily "Spicybrown" Sanchez	54,701	1.18%	4th	
2020	David B. Collins	81,893	0.73%	4th	

==== Executive ====
Year	Candidate	Office	Votes	%	Place	Notes	Ref.
1998	Susan Lee Solar (write-in)	Governor	954	0.03%	4th		
2000	Gary Dugger	Railroad Commissioner	344,820	7.31%	3rd	No Democratic candidate in race	
2000	Charles L. Mauch	Railroad Commissioner (Note: special election)	344,706	7.16%	3rd	No Democratic candidate in race	
2002	Rahul Mahajan	Governor	32,187	0.71%	4th		
2002	Nathalie Paravicini	Lieutenant Governor	44,386	0.98%	4th		
2002	David Keith Cobb	Attorney General	41,560	0.93%	4th		
2002	Ruben L. Reyes	Comptroller of Public Accounts	77,177	1.72%	3rd		
2002	Michael B. McInerney	Land Commissioner	54,130	1.23%	4th		
2002	Jane Woodward Elioseff	Agriculture Commissioner	64,818	1.46%	3rd		
2002	Charles L. Mauch	Railroad Commissioner	52,322	1.19%	4th		
2010	Deborah Shafto	Governor	19,516	0.39%	4th		
2010	Herb Gonzales, Jr.	Lieutenant Governor	44,903	0.91%	4th		
2010	Edward Lindsay	Comptroller of Public Accounts	252,233	6.34%	3rd	No Democratic candidate in race	
2010	Art Browning	Railroad Commissioner	72,291	1.49%	4th		
2012	Chris Kennedy	Railroad Commissioner	153,664	1.99%	4th		
2012	Josh Wendel	Railroad Commissioner	486,485	7.91%	3rd	No Democratic candidate in race	
2014	Brandon Parmer	Governor	18,520	0.39%	4th		
2014	Chandrakantha Courtney	Lieutenant Governor	27,719	0.59%	4th		
2014	Jamar Osborne	Attorney General	29,591	0.63%	4th		
2014	Deborah Shafto	Comptroller of Public Accounts	44,985	0.97%	4th		
2014	Valerie Alessi	Land Commissioner	60,116	1.29%	4th		
2014	Kenneth Kendrick	Agriculture Commissioner	77,557	1.68%	4th		
2014	Martina Salinas	Railroad Commissioner	93,813	2.03%	4th		
2016	Martina Salinas	Railroad Commissioner	287,105	3.28%	4th		
2020	Katija "Kat" Gruene	Railroad Commissioner	129,638	1.18%	4th		
2022	Delilah Barrios	Governor	28,584	0.35%	4th		
2022	Alfred Molison, Jr.	Land Commissioner	133,034	1.67%	3rd		
2022	Hunter Wayne Crow	Railroad Commissioner	85,570	1.08%	4th		
2024	Eddie Espinoza	Railroad Commissioner	301,793	2.75%	3rd		
2026	Kevin McCormick	Lieutenant Governor	88,033	0.90%	4th		
2026	Shehla Faizi	Comptroller of Public Accounts	63,817	0.65%	4th		

==== Judicial ====
Year	Candidate	Office	Seat	Votes	%	Place	Notes	Ref.
2000	Ben G. Levy	Supreme Court	1	451,333	9.71%	3rd	No Democratic candidate in race	
2002	Brad Rockwell	Supreme Court	2	76,082	1.76%	3rd		
2002	Robert C. Owen	Court of Criminal Appeals	1	66,437	1.54%	4th		
2002	Ollie Ruth Jefferson	Court of Criminal Appeals	3	74,984	1.74%	3rd		
2006	Charles E. Waterbury (write-in)	Supreme Court	1	8,045	0.24%	3rd	No Democratic candidate in race	
2012	Charles E. Waterbury	Supreme Court	4	493,208	8.05%	3rd	No Democratic candidate in race	
2012	Jim Chisholm	Supreme Court	6	101,458	1.32%	4th		
2014	Charles E. Waterbury	Supreme Court	7	34,493	0.75%	4th		
2014	Jim Chisholm	Supreme Court	8	345,675	9.24%	3rd	No Democratic candidate in race	
2014	Judith Sanders-Castro	Court of Criminal Appeals	4	394,015	10.44%	3rd	No Democratic candidate in race	
2014	George Joseph Altgelt	Court of Criminal Appeals	9	320,520	8.56%	3rd	No Democratic candidate in race	
2016	Rodolfo Rivera Munoz	Supreme Court	3	232,646	2.65%	4th		
2016	Charles E. Waterbury	Supreme Court	5	107,731	1.23%	4th		
2016	Jim Chisholm	Supreme Court	9	119,022	1.36%	4th		
2016	Adam King Blackwell Reposa	Court of Criminal Appeals	2	121,467	1.39%	4th		
2016	Judith Sanders-Castro	Court of Criminal Appeals	5	192,913	2.21%	4th		
