= 2024 Texas elections =

- November 5, 2024

Elections were held in Texas on November 5, 2024. Primary elections took place on March 5, 2024. Primary runoff elections took place on May 28, 2024.

Seats up for election were all seats of the Texas Legislature, all 38 seats in the United States House of Representatives, and the Class I seat to the United States Senate, for which two-term incumbent Republican Senator Ted Cruz ran for and won re-election. In addition, Texas counties, cities, and school and other special districts had local elections and other ballot issues, such as bond proposals.

== Federal offices ==
=== President of the United States ===
Republican Donald Trump won the state of Texas by a wide margin, winning all 40 of the state's electoral votes.

=== United States Class I Senate Seat ===
Two-term incumbent Republican Senator Ted Cruz won re-election by a wide margin.

=== United States House of Representatives ===
Republicans won 25 seats in the U.S. House of Representatives to the Democrats' 13, with no net change from the previous election.

== Executive ==
=== Railroad Commissioner ===
2024 Texas Railroad Commissioner election
- November 5, 2024
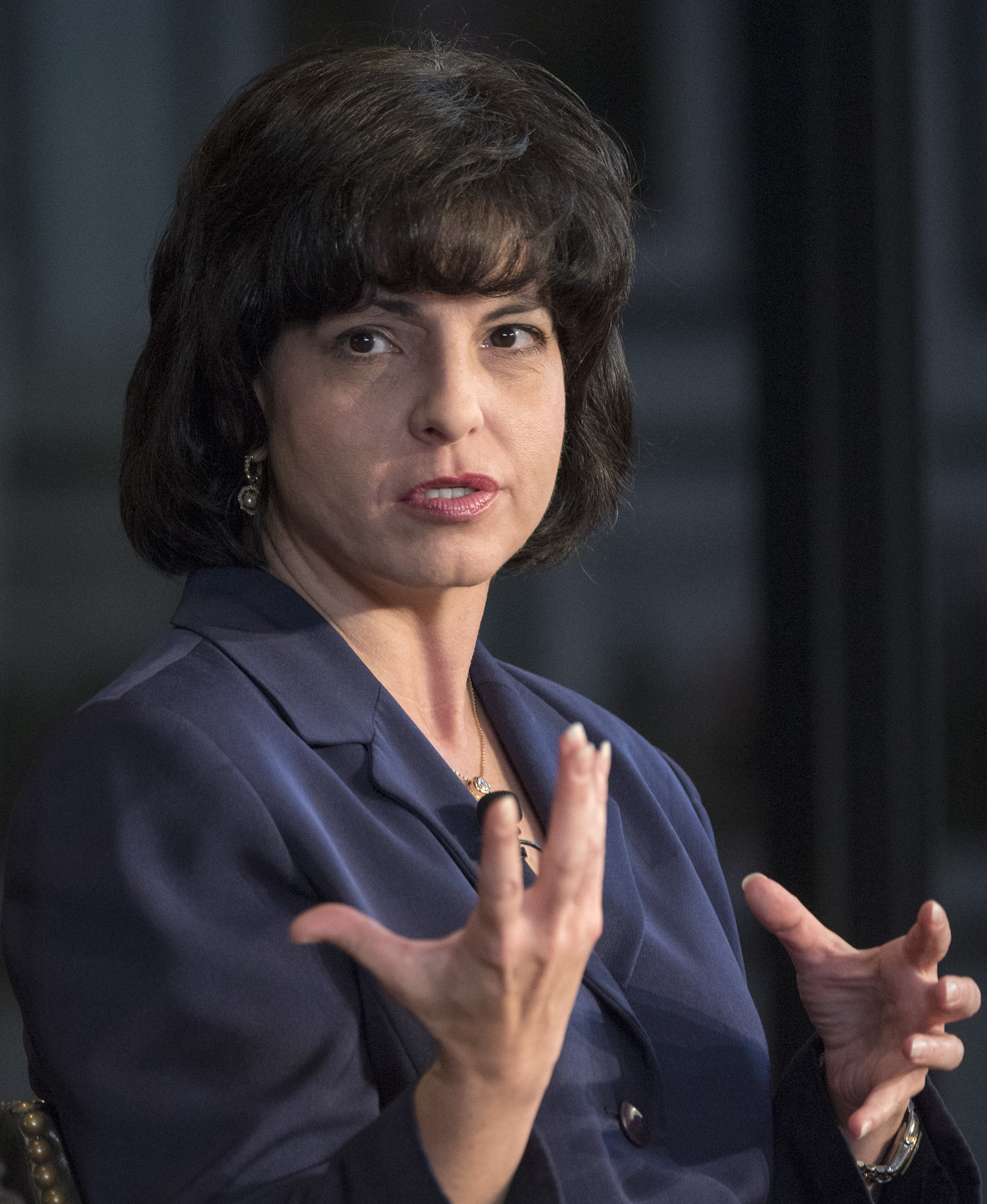

Nominee	Christi Craddick	Katherine Culbert
Party	Republican	Democratic
Popular vote	6,100,218	4,275,904
Percentage	55.63%	39.00%
- Craddick: 40–50% 50–60% 60–70% 70–80% 80–90% >90% Culbert: 40–50% 50–60% 60–70% 70–80% 80–90% >90% Tie: 40–50% 50% No vote
Railroad Commissioner before election
Christi Craddick
Republican
Elected Railroad Commissioner
Christi Craddick
Republican

Incumbent commissioner Christi Craddick was re-elected to a third 6-year term.

==== Republican primary ====
===== Candidates =====
- Christie Clark, attorney
- Christi Craddick, incumbent Railroad Commissioner
- Corey Howell, construction operator
- Jim Matlock, oil & gas industry consultant
- Petra Reyes

===== Endorsements =====
Declined to endorse

Newspapers

- The Dallas Morning News

===== Results =====
Republican primary results
Party	Candidate	Votes	%
Republican	Christi Craddick (incumbent)	982,457	50.42%
Republican	Jim Matlock	517,624	26.56%
Republican	Christie Clark	228,395	11.72%
Republican	Corey Howell	122,802	6.30%
Republican	Petra Reyes	97,280	4.99%
Total votes		1,948,558	100.00%

==== Democratic primary ====
===== Candidates =====
- Bill Burch, drilling engineer
- Katherine Culbert, process safety engineer

===== Endorsements =====
Bill Burch

Newspapers

- The Dallas Morning News

===== Results =====
Democratic primary results
Party	Candidate	Votes	%
Democratic	Katherine Culbert	615,965	67.64%
Democratic	Bill Burch	294,628	32.36%
Total votes		910,593	100.00%

==== General election ====
===== Polling =====
Poll source	Date(s) administered	Sample size (Note: Key: A – all adults RV – registered voters LV – likely voters V – unclear)	Margin of error	Christi Craddick (R)	Katherine Culbert (D)	Other	Undecided
ActiVote	October 17–25, 2024	400 (LV)	± 4.9%	58%	42%	–	–
ActiVote	August 30 – September 30, 2024	400 (LV)	± 4.9%	56%	44%	–	–
ActiVote	July 18 – August 11, 2024	400 (LV)	± 4.9%	56%	44%	–	–
YouGov (Note: Poll sponsored by the University of Houston and Texas Southern University)	June 20 – July 1, 2024	1,484 (LV)	± 2.5%	41%	35%	6% (Note: Hawk Dunlap (L) & Eddie Espinoze (G) with 3%)	18%
Texas Hispanic Policy Foundation	April 5–10, 2024	1,600 (LV)	± 2.45%	41%	29%	6%	24%

===== Endorsements =====
Katherine Culbert

Newspapers

- The Dallas Morning News

===== Results =====
2024 Texas Railroad Commissioner election
Party	Candidate	Votes	%	±%
Republican	Christi Craddick (incumbent)	6,100,218	55.63%	+2.43
Democratic	Katherine Culbert	4,275,904	39.00%	−4.91
Green	Eddie Espinoza	301,793	2.75%	N/A
Libertarian	Hawkins Dunlap	285,544	2.60%	−0.29
Write-in		1,656	0.02%	N/A
Total votes		10,965,115	100.00%	
Republican hold				

== Judicial ==
=== Supreme Court ===
==== Place 2 ====
2024 Texas Supreme Court Place 2 election
- November 5, 2024
Nominee	Jimmy Blacklock	DaSean Jones
Party	Republican	Democratic
Popular vote	6,372,584	4,571,171
Percentage	58.23%	41.77%
- Blacklock: 50–60% 60–70% 70–80% 80–90% >90% Jones: 50–60% 60–70% 70–80% 80–90% >90% Tie: 50% No vote
Justice before election
Jimmy Blacklock
Republican
Elected Justice
Jimmy Blacklock
Republican

Incumbent Justice Jimmy Blacklock was re-elected to a second 6-year term.

===== Republican primary =====
====== Candidates ======
- Jimmy Blacklock, incumbent Associate Justice

====== Results ======
Republican primary results
Party	Candidate	Votes	%
Republican	Jimmy Blacklock (incumbent)	1,749,450	100.0%
Total votes		1,749,450	100.0%

===== Democratic primary =====
====== Candidates ======
- DaSean Jones, Judge of the Harris County District Court (180th District)
- Randy Sarosdy, former counsel to the Texas Justice Court Training Center

====== Endorsements ======
Randy Sarosdy

Newspapers

- The Dallas Morning News

====== Results ======
Democratic primary results
Party	Candidate	Votes	%
Democratic	DaSean Jones	529,623	59.57%
Democratic	Randy Sarosdy	359,402	40.43%
Total votes		889,025	100.0%

===== General election =====
====== Polling ======
Poll source	Date(s) administered	Sample size	Margin of error	Jimmy Blacklock (R)	DaSean Jones (D)	Undecided
ActiVote	October 17–25, 2024	400 (LV)	± 4.9%	56%	44%	–
ActiVote	August 30 – September 30, 2024	400 (LV)	± 4.9%	56%	44%	–
ActiVote	July 18 – August 11, 2024	400 (LV)	± 4.9%	51%	49%	–

====== Endorsements ======
Jimmy Blacklock

Newspapers

- The Dallas Morning News

====== Results ======
2024 Texas Supreme Court Place 2 election
Party	Candidate	Votes	%	±%
Republican	Jimmy Blacklock (incumbent)	6,372,584	58.23%	+5.06
Democratic	DaSean Jones	4,571,171	41.77%	−5.06
Total votes		10,943,755	100.00%	
Republican hold				

==== Place 4 ====
2024 Texas Supreme Court Place 4 election
- November 5, 2024
Nominee	John Devine	Christine Vinh Weems
Party	Republican	Democratic
Popular vote	6,256,496	4,656,560
Percentage	57.33%	42.67%
- Devine: 50–60% 60–70% 70–80% 80–90% >90% Vinh Weems: 50–60% 60–70% 70–80% 80–90% >90% Tie: 50% No vote
Justice before election
John Devine
Republican
Elected Justice
John Devine
Republican

Incumbent Justice John Devine was re-elected to a third 6-year term.

===== Republican primary =====
====== Candidates ======
- John Devine, incumbent Associate Justice of the Supreme Court of Texas
- Brian Walker, Associate Justice of the Second Court of Appeals of Texas

====== Endorsements ======
Brian Walker

Newspapers

- The Dallas Morning News

====== Results ======
Republican Primary results by county: Devine: 50–60%; 60–70%; Walker: 50–60%; 60–70%; 70–80%; 80–90%

Republican primary results
Party	Candidate	Votes	%
Republican	John Devine (incumbent)	921,556	50.44%
Republican	Brian Walker	905,418	49.56%
Total votes		1,826,974	100.0%

===== Democratic primary =====
====== Candidates ======
- Christine Vinh Weems, Judge of the Harris County District Court (281st District)

====== Results ======
Democratic primary results
Party	Candidate	Votes	%
Democratic	Christine Vinh Weems	825,485	100.0%
Total votes		825,485	100.0%

===== General election =====
====== Polling ======
Poll source	Date(s) administered	Sample size	Margin of error	John Devine (R)	Christine Weems (D)	Undecided
ActiVote	October 17–25, 2024	400 (LV)	± 4.9%	55%	45%	–
ActiVote	August 30 – September 30, 2024	400 (LV)	± 4.9%	54%	46%	–
ActiVote	July 18 – August 11, 2024	400 (LV)	± 4.9%	52.5%	47.5%	–

====== Endorsements ======
Christine Vinh Weems

Newspapers

- The Dallas Morning News

====== Results ======
2024 Texas Supreme Court Place 4 election
Party	Candidate	Votes	%	±%
Republican	John Devine (incumbent)	6,256,496	57.33%	+3.62
Democratic	Christine Vinh Weems	4,656,560	42.67%	−3.62
Total votes		10,913,056	100.00%	
Republican hold				

==== Place 6 ====
2024 Texas Supreme Court Place 6 election
- November 5, 2024
Nominee	Jane Bland	Bonnie Lee Goldstein
Party	Republican	Democratic
Popular vote	6,145,167	4,425,189
Percentage	56.24%	40.50%
- Bland: 40–50% 50–60% 60–70% 70–80% 80–90% >90% Goldstein: 40–50% 50–60% 60–70% 70–80% 80–90% >90% Tie: 40–50% 50% No vote
Justice before election
Jane Bland
Republican
Elected Justice
Jane Bland
Republican

Incumbent Justice Jane Bland was elected to a full 6-year term, after last being elected in 2020 to finish the remainder of her predecessor, Jeff Brown's, term.

===== Republican primary =====
====== Candidates ======
- Jane Bland, incumbent Associate Justice

====== Results ======
Republican primary results
Party	Candidate	Votes	%
Republican	Jane Bland (incumbent)	1,690,507	100.0%
Total votes		1,690,507	100.0%

===== Democratic primary =====
====== Candidates ======
- Bonnie Lee Goldstein, Associate Justice of the Fifth Court of Appeals of Texas
- Joe Pool, Judge of the Hays County District Court (428th District)

====== Endorsements ======
Bonnie Lee Goldstein

Newspapers

- The Dallas Morning News

====== Results ======
Democratic primary results
Party	Candidate	Votes	%
Democratic	Bonnie Lee Goldstein	646,690	73.14%
Democratic	Joe Pool	237,465	26.86%
Total votes		884,155	100.0%

===== General election =====
====== Polling ======
Poll source	Date(s) administered	Sample size	Margin of error	Jane Bland (R)	Bonnie Goldstein (D)	Undecided
ActiVote	October 17–25, 2024	400 (LV)	± 4.9%	57%	43%	–
ActiVote	August 30 – September 30, 2024	400 (LV)	± 4.9%	55%	45%	–
ActiVote	July 18 – August 11, 2024	400 (LV)	± 4.9%	53%	47%	–

====== Endorsements ======
Jane Bland

Newspapers

- The Dallas Morning News

====== Results ======
2024 Texas Supreme Court Place 6 election
Party	Candidate	Votes	%	±%
Republican	Jane Bland (incumbent)	6,145,167	56.24%	+2.53
Democratic	Bonnie Lee Goldstein	4,425,189	40.50%	−5.79
Libertarian	David Roberson	355,485	3.25%	N/A
Total votes		10,925,841	100.0%	
Republican hold				

=== Court of Criminal Appeals ===
In 2021, the Texas Court of Criminal Appeals issued an 8–1 decision, holding that the Texas Attorney General does not have unilateral authority to prosecute election code violations. All three incumbent Judges up for re-election were part of the majority decision. As a result, Attorney General Ken Paxton recruited primary challengers to all three incumbent Republican judges. Ultimately, all three incumbent Judges were defeated by their challengers in the March Republican primary election.

==== Presiding Judge ====
2024 Texas Court of Criminal Appeals Presiding Judge election
- November 5, 2024
Nominee	David Schenck	Holly Taylor
Party	Republican	Democratic
Popular vote	6,330,389	4,558,856
Percentage	58.13%	41.87%
- Schenck: 50–60% 60–70% 70–80% 80–90% >90% Taylor: 50–60% 60–70% 70–80% 80–90% >90% Tie: 50% No votes
Presiding Judge before election
Sharon Keller
Republican
Elected Presiding Judge
David Schenck
Republican

Incumbent Presiding Judge Sharon Keller ran for re-election to a 6th term.

===== Republican primary =====
====== Candidates ======
- David Schenck, former Associate Justice of the Fifth Court of Appeals of Texas (2015–2022)
- Sharon Keller, incumbent Presiding Judge

====== Endorsements ======
David Schenck

Newspapers

- The Dallas Morning News

====== Results ======
Republican primary results
Party	Candidate	Votes	%
Republican	David Schenck	1,174,795	62.58%
Republican	Sharon Keller (incumbent)	702,464	37.42%
Total votes		1,877,259	100.0%

===== Democratic primary =====
====== Candidates ======
- Holly Taylor, assistant director within civil rights division of the Travis County district attorney's office

====== Results ======
Democratic primary results
Party	Candidate	Votes	%
Democratic	Holly Taylor	829,500	100.0%
Total votes		829,500	100.0%

===== General election =====
====== Polling ======
Poll source	Date(s) administered	Sample size	Margin of error	David Schenck (R)	Holly Taylor (D)	Undecided
ActiVote	October 17–25, 2024	400 (LV)	± 4.9%	55%	45%	–
ActiVote	August 30 – September 30, 2024	400 (LV)	± 4.9%	54%	46%	–
ActiVote	July 18 – August 11, 2024	400 (LV)	± 4.9%	59%	41%	–

====== Endorsements ======
David Schenck

Newspapers

- The Dallas Morning News

====== Results ======
2024 Texas Court of Criminal Appeals Presiding Judge election
Party	Candidate	Votes	%	±%
Republican	David Schenck	6,330,389	58.13%	+5.89
Democratic	Holly Taylor	4,558,856	41.87%	−3.61
Total votes		10,889,245	100.00%	
Republican hold				

==== Place 7 ====
2024 Texas Court of Criminal Appeals Place 7 election
- November 5, 2024
Nominee	Gina Parker	Nancy Mulder
Party	Republican	Democratic
Popular vote	6,340,949	4,526,924
Percentage	58.35%	41.65%
- Parker: 50–60% 60–70% 70–80% 80–90% >90% Mulder: 50–60% 60–70% 70–80% 80–90% >90% Tie: 50% No votes
Judge before election
Barbara Parker Hervey
Republican
Elected Judge
Gina Parker
Republican

Incumbent Judge Barbara Parker Hervey ran for re-election to a 4th term.

===== Republican primary =====
====== Candidates ======
- Barbara Parker Hervey, incumbent Judge
- Gina Parker, attorney

====== Endorsements ======
Barbara Parker Hervey

Newspapers

- The Dallas Morning News

====== Results ======
Republican primary results
Party	Candidate	Votes	%
Republican	Gina Parker	1,210,956	66.08%
Republican	Barbara Parker Hervey (incumbent)	621,660	33.92%
Total votes		1,832,616	100.0%

===== Democratic primary =====
====== Candidates ======
- Nancy Mulder, Judge of the Dallas County Criminal District Court (No. 6)

====== Results ======
Democratic primary results
Party	Candidate	Votes	%
Democratic	Nancy Mulder	819,154	100.0%
Total votes		819,154	100.0%

===== General election =====
====== Polling ======
Poll source	Date(s) administered	Sample size	Margin of error	Gina Parker (R)	Nancy Mulder (D)	Undecided
ActiVote	October 17–25, 2024	400 (LV)	± 4.9%	55%	45%	–
ActiVote	August 30 – September 30, 2024	400 (LV)	± 4.9%	56%	44%	–
ActiVote	July 18 – August 11, 2024	400 (LV)	± 4.9%	55%	45%	–

====== Endorsements ======
Nancy Mulder

Newspapers

- The Dallas Morning News

====== Results ======
2024 Texas Court of Criminal Appeals Place 7 election
Party	Candidate	Votes	%	±%
Republican	Gina Parker	6,340,949	58.35%	+4.20
Democratic	Nancy Mulder	4,526,924	41.65%	−4.20
Total votes		10,867,873	100.00%	
Republican hold				

==== Place 8 ====
2024 Texas Court of Criminal Appeals Place 8 election
- November 5, 2024
Nominee	Lee Finley	Chika Anyiam
Party	Republican	Democratic
Popular vote	6,385,238	4,461,229
Percentage	58.87%	41.13%
- Finley: 50–60% 60–70% 70–80% 80–90% >90% Anyiam: 50–60% 60–70% 70–80% 80–90% >90% Tie: 50% No votes
Judge before election
Michelle Slaughter
Republican
Elected Judge
Lee Finley
Republican

Incumbent Judge Michelle Slaughter ran for re-election to a 2nd term.

===== Republican primary =====
====== Candidates ======
- Lee Finley, criminal defense attorney
- Michelle Slaughter, incumbent Judge

====== Endorsements ======
Michelle Slaughter

Newspapers

- The Dallas Morning News

====== Results ======
Republican primary results
Party	Candidate	Votes	%
Republican	Lee Finley	988,824	53.88%
Republican	Michelle Slaughter (incumbent)	846,549	46.12%
Total votes		1,835,373	100.0%

===== Democratic primary =====
====== Candidates ======
- Chika Anyiam, Judge of the Dallas County Criminal District Court (No. 7)

====== Results ======
Democratic primary results
Party	Candidate	Votes	%
Democratic	Chika Anyiam	804,891	100.0%
Total votes		804,891	100.0%

===== General election =====
====== Polling ======
Poll source	Date(s) administered	Sample size	Margin of error	Lee Finley (R)	Chika Anyiam (D)	Undecided
ActiVote	October 17–25, 2024	400 (LV)	± 4.9%	55%	45%	–
ActiVote	August 30 – September 30, 2024	400 (LV)	± 4.9%	55%	45%	–
ActiVote	July 18 – August 11, 2024	400 (LV)	± 4.9%	54%	46%	–

====== Endorsements ======
Chika Anyiam

Newspapers

- The Dallas Morning News

====== Results ======
2024 Texas Court of Criminal Appeals Place 8 election
Party	Candidate	Votes	%	±%
Republican	Lee Finley	6,385,238	58.87%	−15.81
Democratic	Chika Anyiam	4,461,229	41.13%	+41.13
Total votes		10,846,467	100.00%	
Republican hold				

== Board of Education ==
All fifteen seats of the Texas Board of Education were up for election to four-year terms. The board follows a 2-4-4 term system; members are elected to two-year terms at the beginning of each decade. Based on the results of the 2022 election, the board was made up of ten Republicans and five Democrats; however, Democrat Aicha Davis had resigned from her seat to run for the Texas House of Representatives. Despite fellow Democrat Tiffany Clark running unopposed for the seat, Abbott appointed Republican Leslie Recine to fill Davis' unexpired term, giving Republicans an 11–4 majority on the board for the final two months of 2025. During this time, the board adopted the highly controversial Bluebonnet Learning curriculum, which incorporates religion, particularly Christianity, into its elementary school lessons. The passage gave districts financial incentive to adopt the curriculum, although it did not require it. Democrats held onto all of their seats, including a very narrow victory in district 1, returning the board to its 10–5 Republican majority at the start of 2025.

=== District 1 ===
==== Democratic primary ====
Democratic primary results
Party	Candidate	Votes	%
Democratic	Gustavo Reveles	72,349	100.0
Total votes		72,349	100.0

==== Republican primary ====
Republican primary results
Party	Candidate	Votes	%
Republican	Michael Stevens	67,158	100.0
Total votes		67,158	100.0

==== General election ====
2024 Texas Board of Education 1st district election
Party	Candidate	Votes	%	±%
Democratic	Gustavo Reveles	314,162	50.94%	−4.85
Republican	Michael Stevens	302,544	49.06%	+4.85
Total votes		616,706	100.00%	

=== District 3 ===
==== Democratic primary ====
Democratic primary results
Party	Candidate	Votes	%
Democratic	Marisa Perez-Diaz (incumbent)	60,648	100.0
Total votes		60,648	100.0

==== General election ====
2024 Texas Board of Education 3rd district election
Party	Candidate	Votes	%	±%
Democratic	Marisa Perez-Diaz (incumbent)	385,682	100.0	+45.08
Total votes		385,682	100.0	

=== District 4 ===
==== Democratic primary ====
Democratic primary results
Party	Candidate	Votes	%
Democratic	Staci Childs (incumbent)	69,054	100.0
Total votes		69,054	100.0

==== General election ====
2024 Texas Board of Education 4th district election
Party	Candidate	Votes	%	±%
Democratic	Staci Childs (incumbent)	377,807	100.0	
Total votes		377,807	100.0	

=== District 10 ===
==== Republican primary ====
Republican primary results
Party	Candidate	Votes	%
Republican	Tom Maynard (incumbent)	101,741	49.29
Republican	Mary Bone	83,497	40.45
Republican	"DC" Caldwell	21,162	10.25
Total votes		206,400	100.0

Republican primary runoff results
Party	Candidate	Votes	%
Republican	Tom Maynard (incumbent)	24,658	51.82
Republican	Mary Bone	22,924	48.18
Total votes		47,582	100.0

==== Democratic primary ====
Democratic primary results
Party	Candidate	Votes	%
Democratic	Raquel Saenz Ortiz	35,622	78.59
Democratic	"DC" Caldwell I	9,703	21.41
Total votes		45,325	100.0

==== General election ====
2024 Texas Board of Education 10th district election
Party	Candidate	Votes	%	±%
Republican	Tom Maynard (incumbent)	594,496	67.56%	N/A
Democratic	Raquel Saenz Ortiz	285,508	32.44%	N/A
Total votes		880,004	100.00%	

=== District 11 ===
==== Republican primary ====
Republican primary results
Party	Candidate	Votes	%
Republican	Brandon Hall	89,139	53.23%
Republican	Patricia "Pat" Hardy (incumbent)	78,326	46.77%
Total votes		167,465	100.0

==== Democratic primary ====
Democratic primary results
Party	Candidate	Votes	%
Democratic	Rayna Glasser	48,188	100.0
Total votes		48,188	100.0

==== General election ====
2024 Texas Board of Education 11th district election
Party	Candidate	Votes	%	±%
Republican	Brandon Hall	519,163	61.51%	–1.77
Democratic	Rayna Glasser	303,180	35.92%	–0.77
Libertarian	Hunter Crow	21,679	2.57%	N/A
Total votes		844,022	100.00%	

=== District 12 ===
==== Republican primary ====
Republican primary results
Party	Candidate	Votes	%	±%
Republican	Pam Little (incumbent)	63,633	36.38	
Republican	Jamie Kohlmann	47,288	27.04	
Republican	Chad Green	35,446	20.27	
Republican	Matt Rostami	28,542	16.32	
Total votes		174,909	100.0	

==== Democratic primary ====
Democratic primary results
Party	Candidate	Votes	%
Democratic	George King	50,744	100.0
Total votes		50,744	100.0

==== General election ====
2024 Texas Board of Education 12th district election
Party	Candidate	Votes	%	±%
Republican	Pam Little (incumbent)	565,011	63.3%	N/A
Democratic	George King	327,645	36.7%	N/A
Total votes		892,656	100.00%	

=== District 13 ===
==== General election ====
2024 Texas Board of Education 13th district election (Unexpired term)
Party	Candidate	Votes	%	±%
Democratic	Tiffany Clark	418,823	100.0	+27.73
Total votes		418,823	100.0	
Democratic gain from Republican				

=== District 15 ===
==== Republican primary ====
Republican primary results
Party	Candidate	Votes	%
Republican	Aaron Kinsey (incumbent)	175,444	100.0
Total votes		175,444	100.0

==== Democratic primary ====
Democratic primary results
Party	Candidate	Votes	%
Democratic	Morgan Kirkpatrick	17,434	100.0
Total votes		17,434	100.0

==== General election ====
2024 Texas Board of Education 15th district election
Party	Candidate	Votes	%	±%
Republican	Aaron Kinsey (incumbent)	512,043	76.26%	N/A
Democratic	Morgan Kirkpatrick	137,759	20.52%	N/A
Libertarian	Jack Westbrook	21,639	3.22%	N/A
Total votes		671,441	100.00%	

== State legislature ==
All 150 seats of the Texas House of Representatives and 15 of the 31 seats of the Texas State Senate are up for election. The winners of this election will serve in the 89th Texas Legislature.

== Local elections ==
=== Mayoral elections ===
==== Eligible incumbents ====
- Austin: One-term incumbent Kirk Watson successfully ran for re-election.
- Corpus Christi, Texas: Two-term incumbent Paulette Guajardo is eligible for re-election.

==== Ineligible or retiring incumbents ====
- Lubbock, Texas: Mark McBrayer was elected on May 4 to replace retiring one-term incumbent Republican Trey Payne.
- El Paso: One-term incumbent Oscar Leeser chose not to run for re-election, and was succeeded by Renard Johnson.

== See also ==
- 2024 United States elections

== Notes ==
Partisan clients
