= 2012 Texas elections =

- November 6, 2012

Elections were held in Texas on November 6, 2012. Primary elections took place on May 29, 2012. Runoff elections took place on July 31, 2012.

== Federal offices ==
=== President of the United States ===
Texas had 38 electoral votes in the Electoral College, which went to Republican presidential candidate Mitt Romney.

=== United States Class I Senate Seat ===
Incumbent Republican Senator Kay Bailey Hutchison retired and did not seek re-election for a fourth full term. Republican Ted Cruz won the seat, defeating Democrat Paul Sadler.

=== United States House of Representatives ===
There were 36 U.S. Representative seats up for election in Texas; four more seats than in the 2010 election. The Republican Party won 24 seats, while the Democrats won 12.

== Executive ==
=== Railroad commissioner ===
2012 Texas Railroad Commissioner election
- November 6, 2012
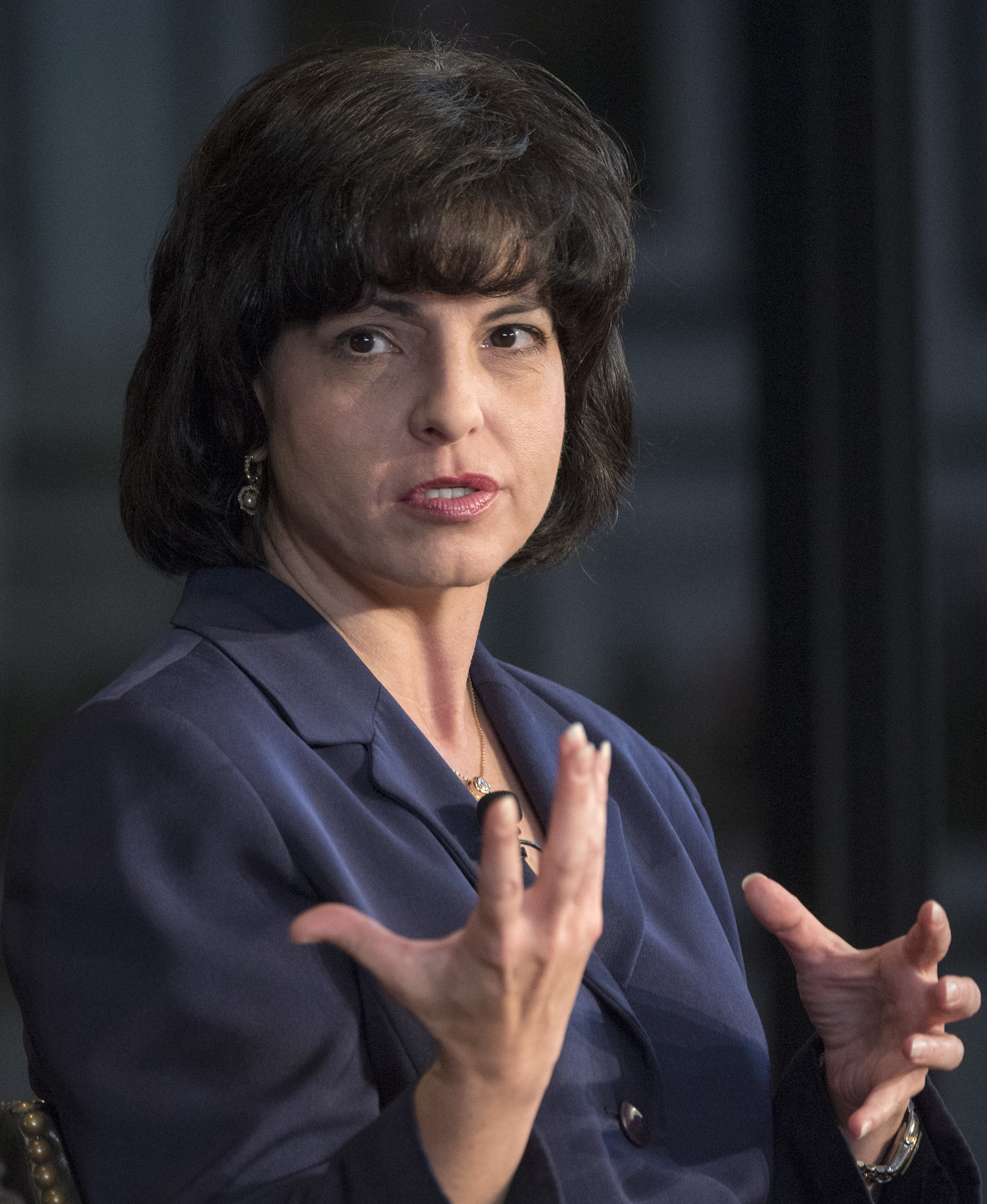

Nominee	Christi Craddick	Dale Henry
Party	Republican	Democratic
Popular vote	4,336,499	3,057,733
Percentage	56.17%	39.60%
- Congressional district results Craddick: 40–50% 50–60% 60–70% 70–80% Henry: 50–60% 60–70% 70–80%
Railroad Commissioner before election
Buddy Garcia
Republican
Elected Railroad Commissioner
Christi Craddick
Republican

Incumbent Buddy Garcia, who was appointed by Governor Rick Perry to fill the vacancy left by Elizabeth Ames Jones, did not seek re-election. Republican Christi Craddick won the election for a six-year term.

==== Republican primary ====
===== Candidates =====
- Becky Berger, geologist
- Beryl Burgess, retired industrial lab technician
- Warren Chisum, state representative from the 88th District
- Joe Cotten, financial adviser
- Christi Craddick, oil and gas attorney
- Roland Sledge, oil and gas attorney

===== Primary results =====
Republican primary results
Party	Candidate	Votes	%
Republican	Christi Craddick	421,610	35.87%
Republican	Warren Chisum	320,052	27.23%
Republican	Becky Berger	140,752	11.98%
Republican	Joe Cotten	123,137	10.48%
Republican	Roland Sledge	116,122	9.88%
Republican	Beryl Burgess	53,553	4.56%
Total votes		1,175,226	100.00%

===== Runoff results =====
Republican primary runoff results
Party	Candidate	Votes	%
Republican	Christi Craddick	592,860	59.81%
Republican	Warren Chisum	398,421	40.19%
Total votes		991,281	100.00%

==== Democratic primary ====
===== Candidates =====
- Dale Henry, petroleum engineer

===== Primary results =====
Democratic primary results
Party	Candidate	Votes	%
Democratic	Dale Henry	446,160	100.00%
Total votes		446,160	100.00%

==== General election ====
===== Results =====
2012 Texas Railroad Commissioner election
Party	Candidate	Votes	%
Republican	Christi Craddick	4,336,499	56.17%
Democratic	Dale Henry	3,057,733	39.60%
Libertarian	Vivekananda Wall	173,001	2.24%
Green	Chris Kennedy	153,664	1.99%
Total votes		7,720,897	100.00%
Republican hold			

=== Railroad commissioner (unexpired term) ===
2012 Texas Railroad Commissioner (unexpired term) election
- November 6, 2012
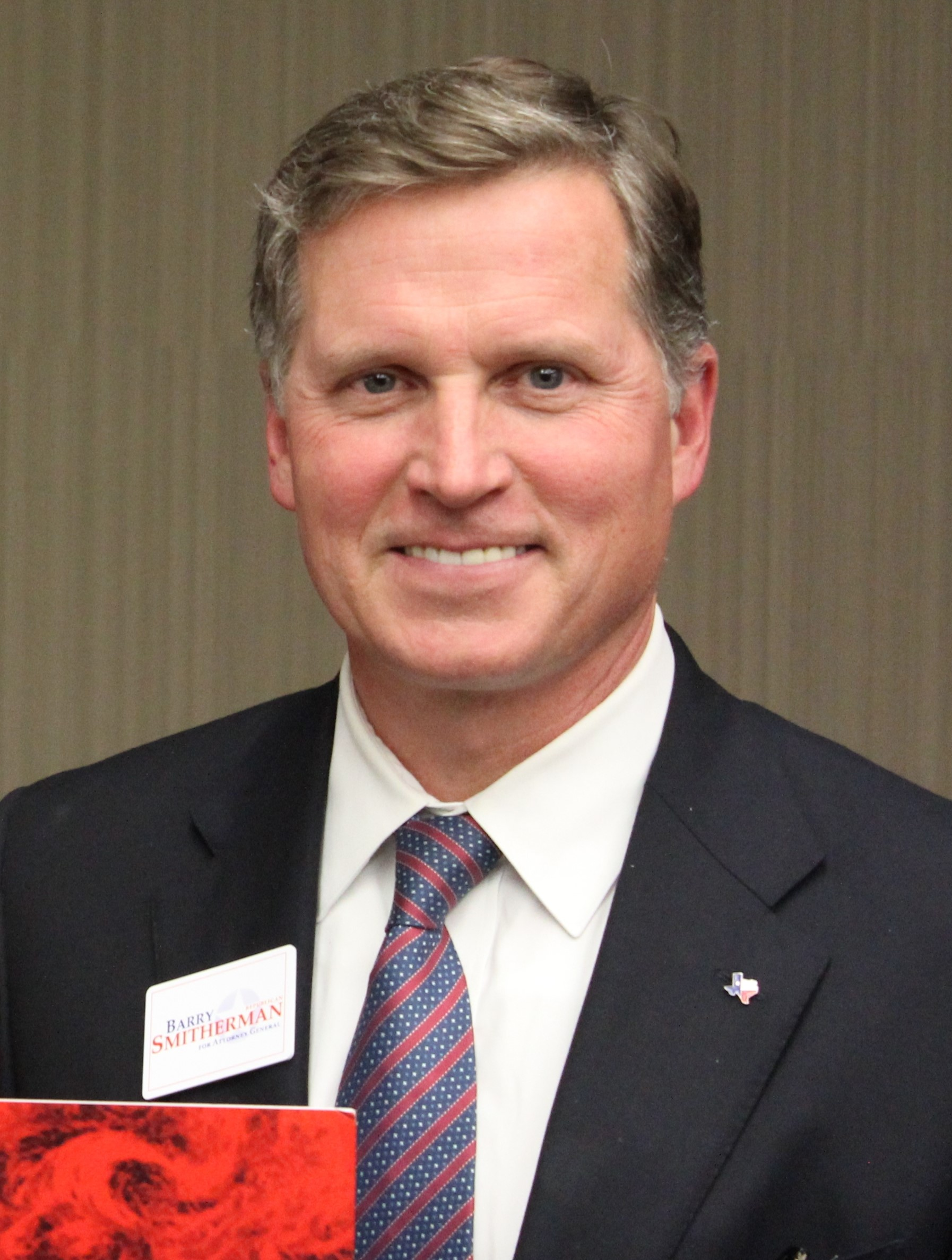

Nominee	Barry T. Smitherman	Jaime O. Perez	Josh Wendel
Party	Republican	Libertarian	Green
Popular vote	4,537,625	1,127,074	486,485
Percentage	73.77%	18.32%	7.91%
- County results Smitherman: 40–50% 50–60% 60–70% 70–80% 80–90% >90% Perez: 50–60%
Railroad Commissioner before election
Barry T. Smitherman
Republican
Elected Railroad Commissioner
Barry T. Smitherman
Republican

Incumbent Barry T. Smitherman was elected to the remaining two years of a six-year term following his appointment to fill the vacancy left by Michael L. Williams, who resigned to contest for the United States House of Representatives.

==== Republican primary ====
===== Candidates =====
- Al Lee, retired systems consultant
- Elizabeth Murray-Kolb, attorney
- Greg Parker, Comal County commissioner
- Barry T. Smitherman, incumbent railroad commissioner

===== Primary results =====
Republican primary results
Party	Candidate	Votes	%
Republican	Barry T. Smitherman (incumbent)	497,100	44.24%
Republican	Greg Parker	311,903	27.76%
Republican	Elizabeth Murray-Kolb	241,784	21.52%
Republican	Al Lee	72,867	6.48%
Total votes		1,123,654	100.00%

===== Runoff results =====
Republican primary runoff results
Party	Candidate	Votes	%
Republican	Barry T. Smitherman (incumbent)	583,506	62.14%
Republican	Greg Parker	355,480	37.86%
Total votes		938,986	100.00%

==== General election ====
===== Results =====
2012 Texas Railroad Commissioner (Unexpired Term) election
Party	Candidate	Votes	%
Republican	Barry T. Smitherman (incumbent)	4,537,625	73.77%
Libertarian	Jaime O. Perez	1,127,074	18.32%
Green	Josh Wendel	486,485	7.91%
Total votes		6,151,184	100.00%
Republican hold			

== Judicial ==
=== Supreme Court ===
==== Place 2 ====
2012 Texas Supreme Court Place 2 election
- November 6, 2012
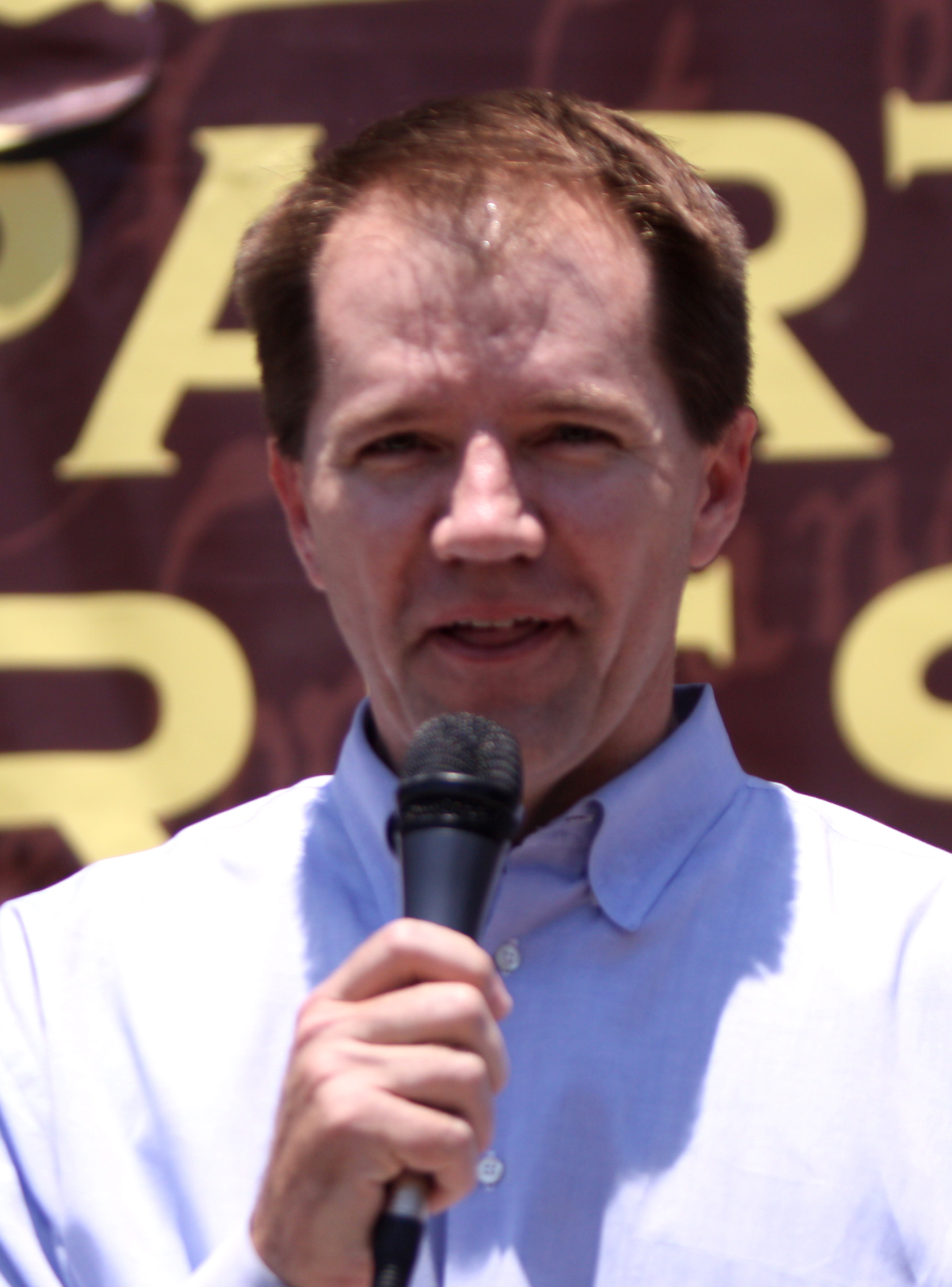

Nominee	Don Willett	RS Roberto Koelsch
Party	Republican	Libertarian
Popular vote	4,771,916	1,285,794
Percentage	78.77%	21.23%
Justice before election
Don Willett
Republican
Elected Justice
Don Willett
Republican

Incumbent Justice Don Willett was re-elected to a second six-year term.

===== Republican primary =====
====== Candidates ======
- Steven Wayne Smith, former justice of the Supreme Court of Texas
- Don Willett, incumbent associate justice

====== Primary results ======
Republican primary results
Party	Candidate	Votes	%
Republican	Don Willett (incumbent)	644,807	56.82%
Republican	Steven Wayne Smith	490,089	43.18%
Total votes		1,134,896	100.00%

===== General election =====
====== Results ======
2012 Texas Supreme Court Place 2 election
Party	Candidate	Votes	%
Republican	Don Willett (incumbent)	4,771,916	78.77%
Libertarian	RS Roberto Koelsch	1,285,794	21.23%
Total votes		6,057,710	100.00%
Republican hold			

==== Place 4 ====
2012 Texas Supreme Court Place 4 election
- November 6, 2012

Nominee	John P. Devine	Tom Oxford	Charles E. Waterbury
Party	Republican	Libertarian	Green
Popular vote	4,599,483	1,034,945	493,208
Percentage	75.06%	16.89%	8.05%
Justice before election
David M. Medina
Republican
Elected Justice
John P. Devine
Republican

Incumbent Justice David M. Medina lost renomination in the Republican primary to John P. Devine, who would go on to win the election and a six-year-term.

===== Republican primary =====
====== Candidates ======
- John P. Devine, former Texas District Court judge
- David M. Medina, incumbent associate justice
- Joe Pool Jr., lawyer

====== Primary results ======
Republican primary results
Party	Candidate	Votes	%
Republican	David M. Medina (incumbent)	432,598	38.96%
Republican	John P. Devine	357,837	32.22%
Republican	Joe Pool Jr.	320,052	28.82%
Total votes		1,110,487	100.00%

====== Runoff results ======
Republican primary runoff results
Party	Candidate	Votes	%
Republican	John P. Devine	499,334	53.27%
Republican	David M. Medina (incumbent)	438,029	46.73%
Total votes		937,363	100.00%

===== General election =====
====== Results ======
2012 Texas Supreme Court Place 4 election
Party	Candidate	Votes	%
Republican	John P. Devine	4,599,483	75.06%
Libertarian	Tom Oxford	1,034,945	16.89%
Green	Charles E. Waterbury	493,208	8.05%
Total votes		6,127,636	100.00%
Republican hold			

==== Place 6 ====
2012 Texas Supreme Court Place 6 election
- November 6, 2012
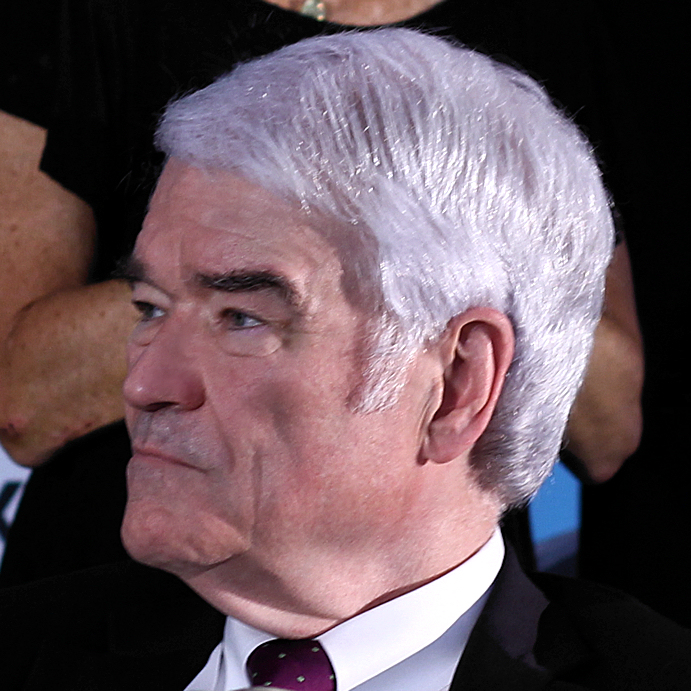

Nominee	Nathan Hecht	Michele Petty
Party	Republican	Democratic
Popular vote	4,127,493	3,219,948
Percentage	53.72%	41.91%
Justice before election
Nathan Hecht
Republican
Elected Justice
Nathan Hecht
Republican

Incumbent Justice Nathan Hecht was re-elected to a fifth six-year term.

===== Republican primary =====
====== Candidates ======
- Nathan Hecht, incumbent associate justice

====== Primary results ======
Republican primary results
Party	Candidate	Votes	%
Republican	Nathan Hecht (incumbent)	994,715	100.00%
Total votes		994,715	100.00%

===== Democratic primary =====
====== Candidates ======
- Michele Petty, attorney

====== Primary results ======
Democratic primary results
Party	Candidate	Votes	%
Democratic	Michele Petty	439,302	100.00%
Total votes		439,302	100.00%

===== General election =====
====== Results ======
2012 Texas Supreme Court Place 6 election
Party	Candidate	Votes	%
Republican	Nathan Hecht (incumbent)	4,127,493	53.72%
Democratic	Michele Petty	3,219,948	41.91%
Libertarian	Mark Ash	234,164	3.05%
Green	Jim Chisholm	101,458	1.32%
Total votes		7,683,063	100.00%
Republican hold			

=== Court of Criminal Appeals ===
==== Presiding judge ====
2012 Texas Court of Criminal Appeals presiding judge election
- November 6, 2012

Nominee	Sharon Keller	Keith Hampton
Party	Republican	Democratic
Popular vote	4,257,024	3,163,825
Percentage	55.49%	41.24%
Justice before election
Sharon Keller
Republican
Elected Justice
Sharon Keller
Republican

Incumbent Presiding Judge Sharon Keller was re-elected to a fourth six-year-term.

===== Republican primary =====
====== Candidates ======
- Sharon Keller, incumbent presiding judge

====== Primary results ======
Republican primary results
Party	Candidate	Votes	%
Republican	Sharon Keller (incumbent)	1,002,418	100.00%
Total votes		1,002,418	100.00%

===== Democratic primary =====
====== Candidates ======
- Keith Hampton, defense lawyer

====== Primary results ======
Democratic primary results
Party	Candidate	Votes	%
Democratic	Keith Hampton	432,111	100.00%
Total votes		432,111	100.00%

===== General election =====
====== Results ======
2012 Texas Court of Criminal Appeals Presiding Judge election
Party	Candidate	Votes	%
Republican	Sharon Keller (incumbent)	4,257,024	55.49%
Democratic	Keith Hampton	3,163,825	41.24%
Libertarian	Lance Stott	250,457	3.26%
Total votes		7,671,306	100.00%
Republican hold			

==== Place 7 ====
2012 Texas Court of Criminal Appeals Place 7 election
- November 6, 2012

Nominee	Barbara Parker Hervey	Mark W. Bennett
Party	Republican	Libertarian
Popular vote	4,687,370	1,331,364
Percentage	77.88%	22.12%
Justice before election
Barbara Parker Hervey
Republican
Elected Justice
Barbara Parker Hervey
Republican

Incumbent Judge Barbara Parker Hervey was re-elected for a third six-year-term.

===== Republican primary =====
====== Candidates ======
- Barbara Parker Hervey, incumbent judge

====== Primary results ======
Republican primary results
Party	Candidate	Votes	%
Republican	Barbara Parker Hervey (incumbent)	981,815	100.00%
Total votes		981,815	100.00%

===== General election =====
====== Results ======
2012 Texas Court of Criminal Appeals Place 7 election
Party	Candidate	Votes	%
Republican	Barbara Parker Hervey (incumbent)	4,687,370	77.88%
Libertarian	Mark W. Bennett	1,331,364	22.12%
Total votes		6,018,734	100.00%
Republican hold			

==== Place 8 ====
2012 Texas Court of Criminal Appeals Place 8 election
- November 6, 2012

Nominee	Elsa Alcala	William Bryan Strange III
Party	Republican	Libertarian
Popular vote	4,692,420	1,318,734
Percentage	78.06%	21.94%
Justice before election
Elsa Alcala
Republican
Elected Justice
Elsa Alcala
Republican

Incumbent Judge Elsa Alcala was appointed to the Texas Court of Criminal Appeals in 2011, following the stepping-down of Charles Holcomb. Alcala was elected to a six-year-term.

===== Republican primary =====
====== Candidates ======
- Elsa Alcala, incumbent judge

====== Primary results ======
Republican primary results
Party	Candidate	Votes	%
Republican	Elsa Alcala (incumbent)	962,469	100.00%
Total votes		962,469	100.00%

===== General election =====
====== Results ======
2012 Texas Court of Criminal Appeals Place 8 election
Party	Candidate	Votes	%
Republican	Elsa Alcala (incumbent)	4,692,420	78.06%
Libertarian	William Bryan Strange III	1,318,734	21.94%
Total votes		6,011,154	100.00%
Republican hold			

== State Board of Education ==
All 15 districts of the Texas Board of Education were up for election.

=== District 1 ===
==== Republican primary ====
Republican primary results
Party	Candidate	Votes	%
Republican	Carlos Garza (incumbent)	32,461	100.00%
Total votes		32,461	100.00%

==== Democratic primary ====
Democratic primary results
Party	Candidate	Votes	%
Democratic	Martha M. Dominguez	49,386	56.11%
Democratic	Sergio Mora	26,434	30.03%
Democratic	Andres Muro	12,201	13.86%
Total votes		88,021	100.00%

==== General election ====
2012 Texas Board of Education District 1 election
Party	Candidate	Votes	%
Democratic	Martha M. Dominguez	205,906	57.63%
Republican	Carlos Garza (incumbent)	151,362	42.37%
Total votes		357,268	100.00%
Democratic gain from Republican			

=== District 2 ===
==== Republican primary ====
Republican primary results
Party	Candidate	Votes	%
Republican	Laurie J. Turner	32,970	76.93%
Republican	Veronica Anzaldua	9,886	23.07%
Total votes		42,856	100.00%

==== Democratic primary ====
Democratic primary results
Party	Candidate	Votes	%
Democratic	Celeste Zepeda Sanchez	30,955	44.56%
Democratic	Ruben Cortez Jr.	24,420	35.15%
Democratic	Larry E. Garza	14,099	20.29%
Total votes		69,474	100.00%

Democratic primary runoff results
Party	Candidate	Votes	%
Democratic	Ruben Cortez Jr.	20,253	50.57%
Democratic	Celeste Zepeda Sanchez	19,794	49.43%
Total votes		40,047	100.00%

==== General election ====
2012 Texas Board of Education District 2 election
Party	Candidate	Votes	%
Democratic	Ruben Cortez Jr.	204,208	53.76%
Republican	Laurie J. Turner	164,497	43.30%
Libertarian	Lenard Nelson	11,159	2.94%
Total votes		379,864	100.00%
Democratic hold			

=== District 3 ===
==== Republican primary ====
Republican primary results
Party	Candidate	Votes	%
Republican	David M. Williams	23,016	100.00%
Total votes		23,016	100.00%

==== Democratic primary ====
Democratic primary results
Party	Candidate	Votes	%
Democratic	Marisa B. Perez	36,728	65.95%
Democratic	Michael Soto (incumbent)	18,959	34.05%
Total votes		55,687	100.00%

==== General election ====
2012 Texas Board of Education District 3 election
Party	Candidate	Votes	%
Democratic	Marisa B. Perez	252,570	65.63%
Republican	David M. Williams	132,294	34.37%
Total votes		384,864	100.00%
Democratic hold			

=== District 4 ===
==== Republican primary ====
Republican primary results
Party	Candidate	Votes	%
Republican	Dorothy Olmos	13,208	100.00%
Total votes		13,208	100.00%

==== Democratic primary ====
Democratic primary results
Party	Candidate	Votes	%
Democratic	Lawrence Allen Jr. (incumbent)	38,622	100.00%
Total votes		38,622	100.00%

==== General election ====
2012 Texas Board of Education District 4 election
Party	Candidate	Votes	%
Democratic	Lawrence Allen Jr. (incumbent)	303,071	78.29%
Republican	Dorothy Olmos	84,029	21.71%
Total votes		387,100	100.00%
Democratic hold			

=== District 5 ===
==== Republican primary ====
Republican primary results
Party	Candidate	Votes	%
Republican	Ken Mercer (incumbent)	67,594	70.78%
Republican	Steve Salyer	27,901	29.22%
Total votes		95,495	100.00%

==== Democratic primary ====
Democratic primary results
Party	Candidate	Votes	%
Democratic	Rebecca Bell-Metereau	38,419	100.00%
Total votes		38,419	100.00%

==== General election ====
2012 Texas Board of Education District 5 election
Party	Candidate	Votes	%
Republican	Ken Mercer (incumbent)	338,705	51.30%
Democratic	Rebecca Bell-Metereau	281,445	42.63%
Libertarian	Mark Loewe	28,407	4.30%
Green	Irene Meyer Scharf	11,717	1.77%
Total votes		660,274	100.00%
Republican hold			

=== District 6 ===
==== Republican primary ====
Republican primary results
Party	Candidate	Votes	%
Republican	Donna Bahorich	66,899	100.00%
Total votes		66,899	100.00%

==== Democratic primary ====
Democratic primary results
Party	Candidate	Votes	%
Democratic	Traci Jensen	8,657	51.47%
Democratic	Patty Quintana-Nilsson	4,995	29.70%
Democratic	David Scott	3,169	18.84%
Total votes		16,821	100.00%

==== General election ====
2012 Texas Board of Education District 6 election
Party	Candidate	Votes	%
Republican	Donna Bahorich	304,702	57.12%
Democratic	Traci Jensen	208,198	39.03%
Libertarian	Gene Clark	15,189	2.85%
Green	G C Molison	5,328	1.00%
Total votes		533,417	100.00%
Republican hold			

=== District 7 ===
==== Republican primary ====
Republican primary results
Party	Candidate	Votes	%
Republican	David Bradley (incumbent)	59,761	57.88%
Republican	Rita Ashley	43,482	42.12%
Total votes		103,243	100.00%

==== General election ====
2012 Texas Board of Education District 7 election
Party	Candidate	Votes	%
Republican	David Bradley (incumbent)	389,106	82.21%
Libertarian	Matthew Petre	84,212	17.79%
Total votes		473,318	100.00%
Republican hold			

=== District 8 ===
==== Republican primary ====
Republican primary results
Party	Candidate	Votes	%
Republican	Barbara Cargill (incumbent)	69,339	68.01%
Republican	Linda Ellis	32,614	31.99%
Total votes		101,953	100.00%

==== Democratic primary ====
Democratic primary results
Party	Candidate	Votes	%
Democratic	Dexter Smith	8,335	58.31%
Democratic	Rick Soliz	5,960	41.69%
Total votes		14,295	100.00%

==== General election ====
2012 Texas Board of Education District 8 election
Party	Candidate	Votes	%
Republican	Barbara Cargill (incumbent)	387,927	70.96%
Democratic	Dexter Smith	158,777	29.04%
Total votes		546,704	100.00%
Republican hold			

=== District 9 ===
==== Republican primary ====
Republican primary results
Party	Candidate	Votes	%
Republican	Thomas Ratliff (incumbent)	73,889	52.31%
Republican	Randy Stevenson	67,351	47.69%
Total votes		141,240	100.00%

==== General election ====
2012 Texas Board of Education District 9 election
Party	Candidate	Votes	%
Republican	Thomas Ratliff (incumbent)	427,675	85.66%
Libertarian	Sherri L. Little	71,602	14.34%
Total votes		499,277	100.00%
Republican hold			

=== District 10 ===
==== Republican primary ====
Republican primary results
Party	Candidate	Votes	%
Republican	Tom Maynard	38,750	42.95%
Republican	Rebecca Osborne	37,729	41.82%
Republican	Jeff Fleece	13,743	15.23%
Total votes		90,222	100.00%

Republican primary runoff results
Party	Candidate	Votes	%
Republican	Tom Maynard	36,134	50.69%
Republican	Rebecca Osborne	35,146	49.31%
Total votes		71,280	100.00%

==== Democratic primary ====
Democratic primary results
Party	Candidate	Votes	%
Democratic	Judy Jennings	26,927	100.00%
Total votes		26,927	100.00%

==== General election ====
2012 Texas Board of Education District 10 election
Party	Candidate	Votes	%
Republican	Tom Maynard	313,025	56.60%
Democratic	Judy Jennings	239,985	43.40%
Total votes		553,010	100.00%
Republican hold			

=== District 11 ===
==== Republican primary ====
Republican primary results
Party	Candidate	Votes	%
Republican	Patricia Hardy (incumbent)	71,039	100.00%
Total votes		71,039	100.00%

==== General election ====
2012 Texas Board of Education District 11 election
Party	Candidate	Votes	%
Republican	Patricia Hardy (incumbent)	403,740	82.78%
Libertarian	Jason Darr	84,014	17.22%
Total votes		487,754	100.00%
Republican hold			

=== District 12 ===
==== Republican primary ====
Republican primary results
Party	Candidate	Votes	%
Republican	Geraldine Miller	24,070	34.53%
Republican	Gail Spurlock	24,070	24.24%
Republican	George M. Clayton (incumbent)	16,297	23.38%
Republican	Pam Little	12,452	17.86%
Total votes		69,715	100.00%

Republican primary runoff results
Party	Candidate	Votes	%
Republican	Geraldine Miller	44,109	60.34%
Republican	Gail Spurlock	28,990	39.66%
Total votes		73,099	100.00%

==== Democratic primary ====
Democratic primary results
Party	Candidate	Votes	%
Democratic	Lois Parrott	14,495	100.00%
Total votes		14,495	100.00%

==== General election ====
2012 Texas Board of Education District 12 election
Party	Candidate	Votes	%
Republican	Geraldine Miller	358,678	60.73%
Democratic	Lois Parrott	231,925	39.27%
Total votes		590,603	100.00%
Republican hold			

=== District 13 ===
==== Republican primary ====
Republican primary results
Party	Candidate	Votes	%
Republican	S.T. Russell	16,726	100.00%
Total votes		16,726	100.00%

==== Democratic primary ====
Democratic primary results
Party	Candidate	Votes	%
Democratic	Mavis Best Knight (incumbent)	39,743	100.00%
Total votes		39,743	100.00%

==== General election ====
2012 Texas Board of Education District 13 election
Party	Candidate	Votes	%
Democratic	Mavis Best Knight (incumbent)	308,486	74.33%
Republican	S.T. Russell	106,517	25.67%
Total votes		415,003	100.00%
Democratic hold			

=== District 14 ===
==== Republican primary ====
Republican primary results
Party	Candidate	Votes	%
Republican	Sue Melton	55,469	53.17%
Republican	Gail Lowe (incumbent)	48,852	46.83%
Total votes		104,321	100.00%

==== General election ====
2012 Texas Board of Education District 14 election
Party	Candidate	Votes	%
Republican	Sue Melton	409,557	83.99%
Libertarian	Stephen Hawkins	78,068	16.01%
Total votes		487,625	100.00%
Republican hold			

=== District 15 ===
==== Republican primary ====
Republican primary results
Party	Candidate	Votes	%
Republican	Marty Rowley	59,435	50.50%
Republican	Anette Carlisle	58,262	49.50%
Total votes		117,697	100.00%

==== Democratic primary ====
Democratic primary results
Party	Candidate	Votes	%
Democratic	Steven D. Schafersman	12,092	100.00%
Total votes		12,092	100.00%

==== General election ====
2012 Texas Board of Education District 15 election
Party	Candidate	Votes	%
Republican	Marty Rowley	390,115	76.37%
Democratic	Steven D. Schafersman	120,737	23.63%
Total votes		510,852	100.00%
Republican hold			

== State legislature ==
All 31 seats in the Texas State Senate and all 150 seats in the Texas House of Representatives were up for election. Elected senators and representatives served in the 83rd Texas Legislature.

=== Texas Senate ===
All 31 seats of the Texas Senate were up for election. No seats changed hands, with the Republican Party retained a 19-seat majority over the Democrat's 12 seats.

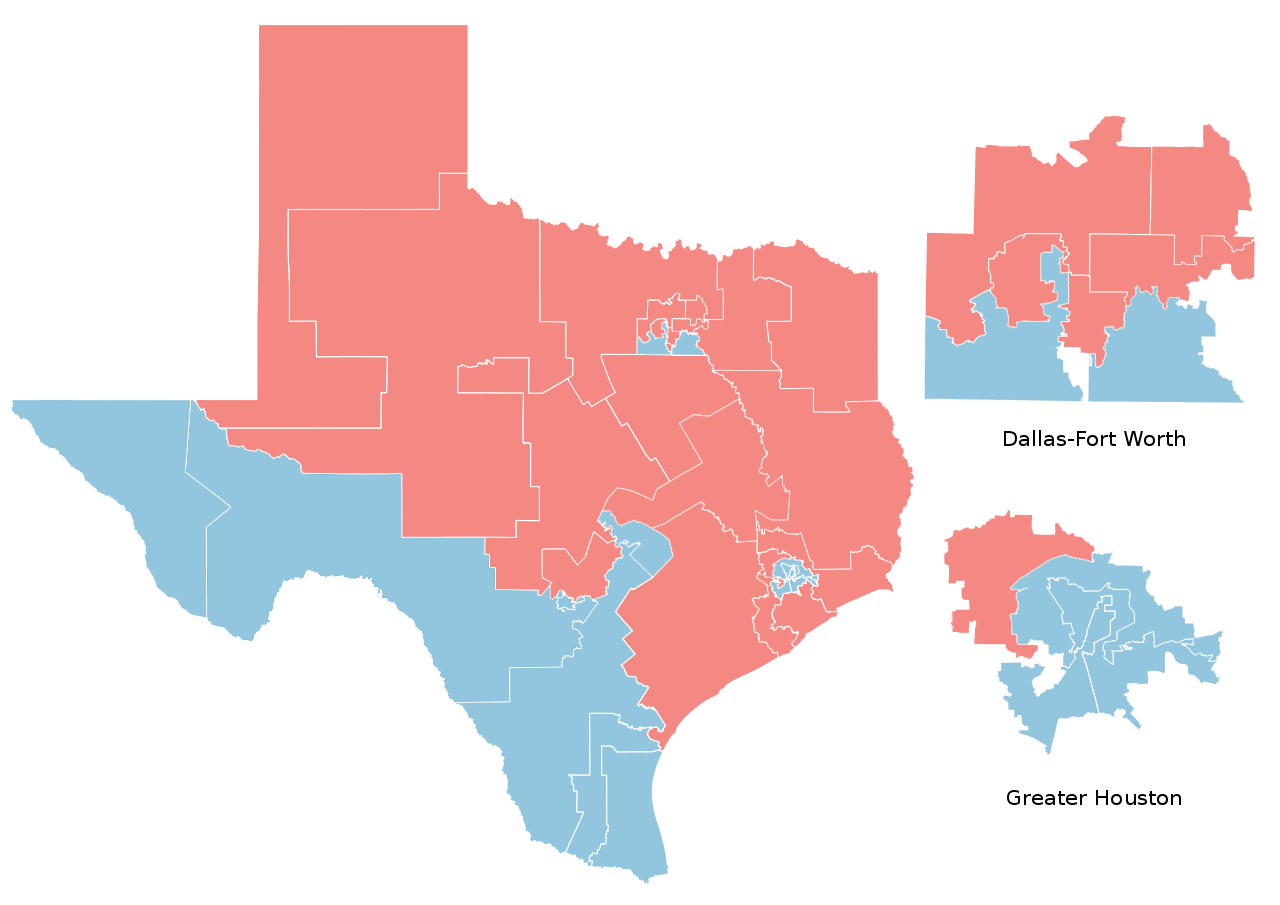
Texas Senate election results Republican hold Democratic hold

Texas Senate
Party	Before	After	Change
Republican	19	19	Steady
Democratic	12	12	Steady
Total	31	31	

=== Texas House of Representatives ===
All 150 seats of the Texas House of Representatives were up for election. The Democratic Party won seven seats, giving them 55 seats to the Republican's majority of 95.

Texas House of Representative election results Republican hold Democratic hold Democratic gain

Texas House of Representatives
Party	Leader	Before	After	Change
Republican	Joe Straus	102	95	▼7
Democratic	Craig Eiland	48	55	▲7
Total		150	150	

== Local elections ==
- Austin: Incumbent mayor Lee Leffingwell was re-elected to a second term.
- Corpus Christi: Nelda Martinez was elected to her first term as mayor.
- Lubbock: Glen Robertson was elected to his first term as mayor, defeating two-term incumbent Tom Martin.

== See also ==
- 2012 United States elections
