= 2010 Texas Comptroller of Public Accounts election =

- November 2, 2010
- Turnout: 29.9% ▲2.7%
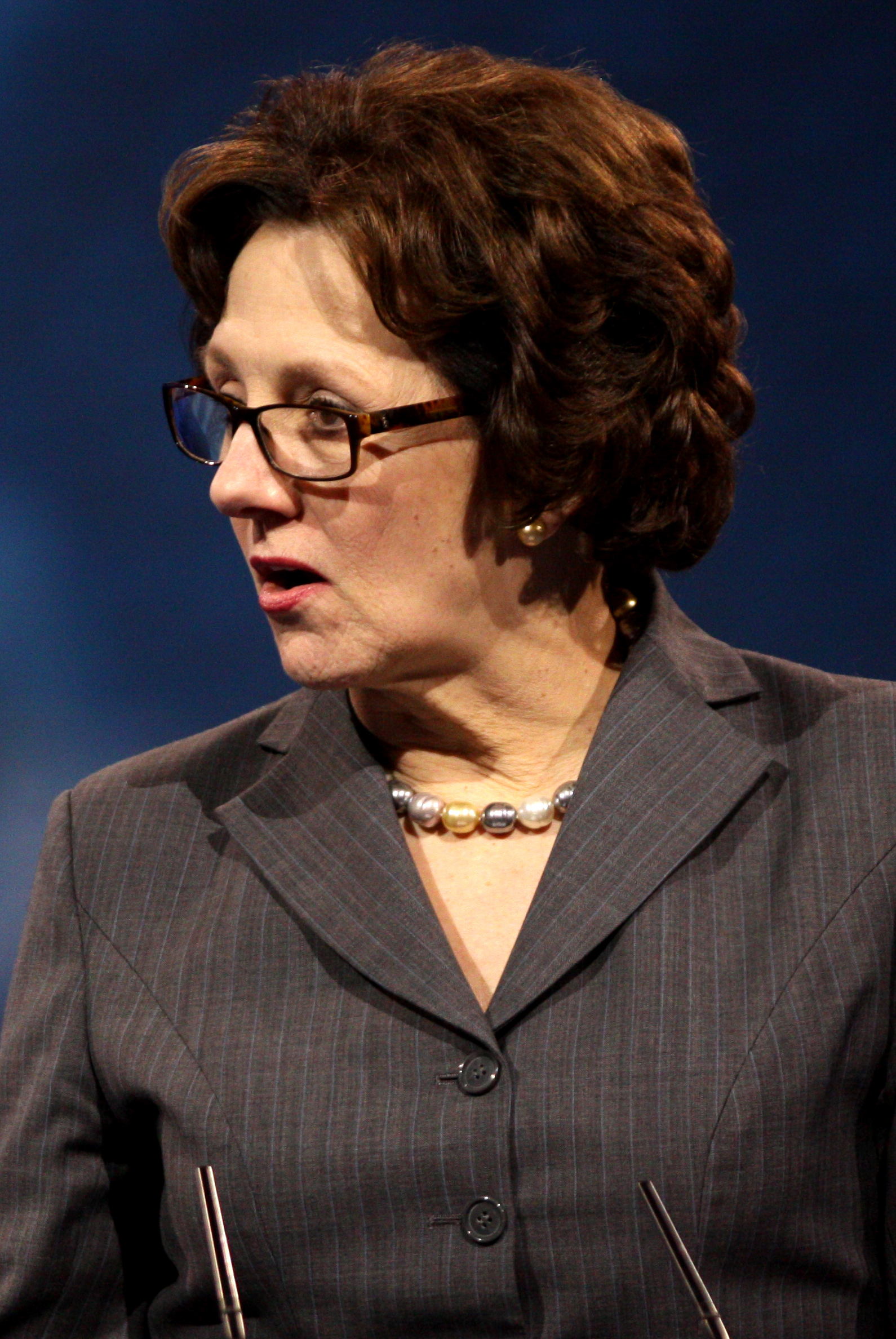

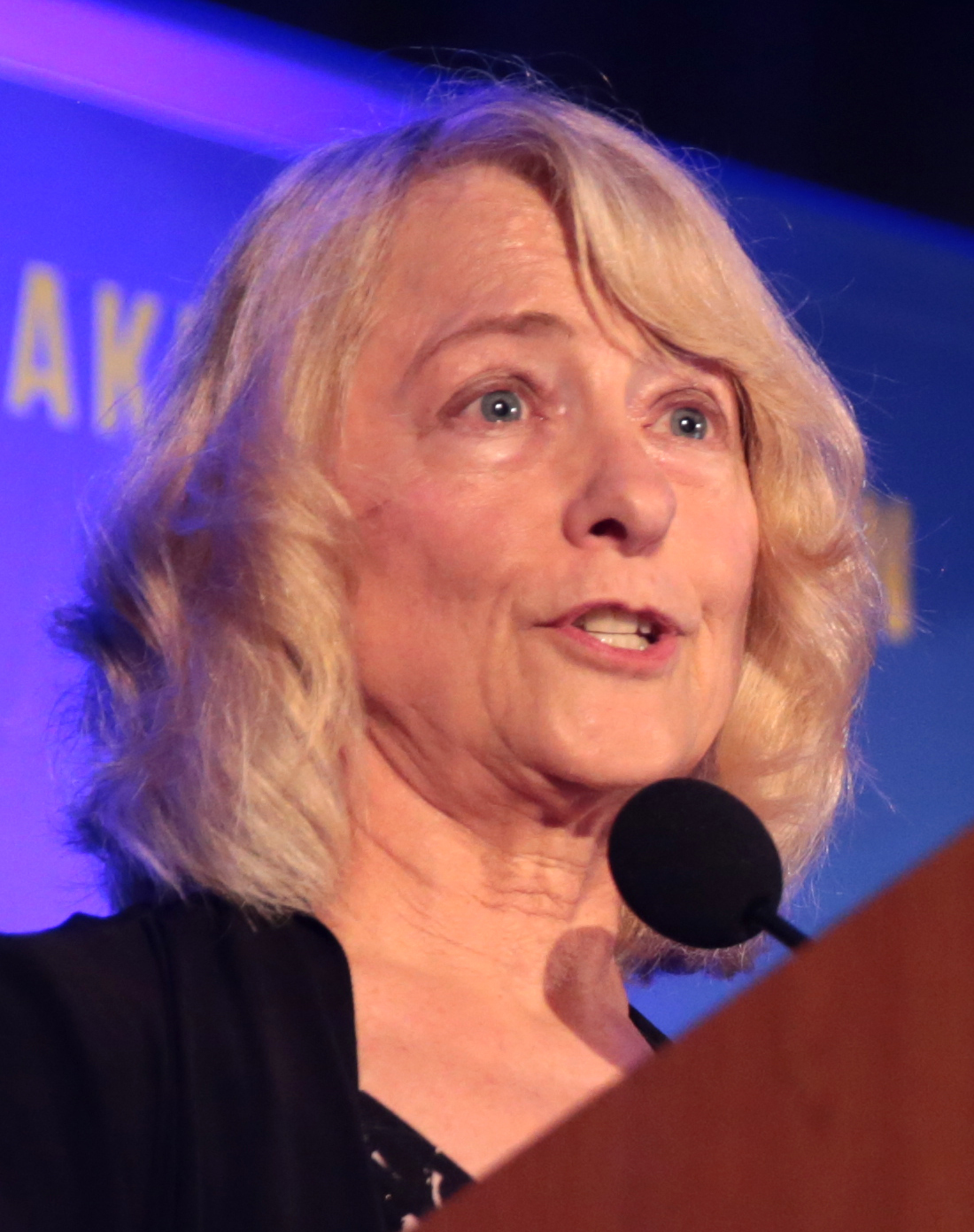

Nominee	Susan Combs	Mary Ruwart	Edward Lindsay
Party	Republican	Libertarian	Green
Popular vote	3,307,935	417,523	252,233
Percentage	83.16%	10.50%	6.34%
- County results Combs: 50–60% 60–70% 70–80% 80–90% >90%
Comptroller before election
Susan Combs
Republican
Elected Comptroller
Susan Combs
Republican

The 2010 Texas Comptroller of Public Accounts election took place on November 2, 2010, to elect the comptroller of public accounts of Texas. Incumbent Republican comptroller Susan Combs successfully ran for re-election against Libertarian Mary Ruwart and Green Party candidate Edward Lindsay, both of whom saw abnormally high levels of support for a third party because the state Democratic Party did not field a candidate.

== Republican primary ==
=== Candidates ===
- Susan Combs, incumbent

=== Results ===
Republican primary results
Party	Candidate	Votes	%
Republican	Susan Combs	1,139,159	100.00
Total votes		1,139,159	100.0

== General election ==
=== Candidates ===
- Susan Combs (R), incumbent comptroller
- Mary Ruwart (L), biomedical researcher
- Edward Lindsay (G), perennial candidate

=== Results ===
On election night Combs won re-election in a landslide against Ruwart and Lindsay.

General election results
Party	Candidate	Votes	%	±%
Republican	Susan Combs (incumbent)	3,307,935	83.16	▲23.69
Libertarian	Mary Ruwart	417,523	10.50	▲6.99
Green	Edward Lindsay	252,233	6.34	N/A
Total votes		3,977,691	100.00	▼7.13
Turnout			29.97	
Republican hold				

== See also ==
- Texas Comptroller of Public Accounts
