= 2014 Texas Attorney General election =

- November 4, 2014
- Turnout: 24.6% (▼1.2%)
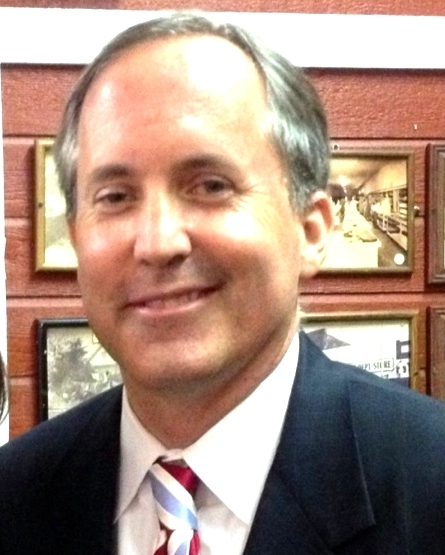

Nominee	Ken Paxton	Sam Houston
Party	Republican	Democratic
Popular vote	2,742,646	1,773,108
Percentage	58.81%	38.02%
- County results Paxton: 40–50% 50–60% 60–70% 70–80% 80–90% >90% Houston: 40–50% 50–60% 60–70% 70–80% 80–90%
Attorney General before election
Greg Abbott
Republican
Elected Attorney General
Ken Paxton
Republican

The 2014 Texas attorney general election took place on November 4, 2014, to elect the attorney general of Texas. Incumbent Republican attorney general Greg Abbott was eligible to seek re-election to a fourth term, but instead decided to run for governor. Republican state senator Ken Paxton defeated Democratic attorney Sam Houston with 58.81% of the vote.

== Republican primary ==
=== Candidates ===
==== Nominee ====
- Ken Paxton, state senator

==== Eliminated in primary ====
- Dan Branch, state representative
- Barry Smitherman, chairman of the Railroad Commission of Texas

==== Declined ====
- Greg Abbott, incumbent attorney general (running for governor)

=== Polling ===
Poll source	Date(s) administered	Sample size	Margin of error	Dan Branch	Ken Paxton	Barry Smitherman	Other	Undecided
UoT/Texas Tribune	February 7–17, 2014	461	± 4.56%	42%	38%	20%	—	—
UoT/Texas Tribune	October 18–27, 2013	519	± 5.02%	5%	10%	11%	—	74%

First round results map by county: Paxton: 30–40% 40–50% 50–60% 60–70%; Branch: 30–40% 40–50% 50–60% 70–80%; Smitherman: 30–40% 40–50%

=== Results ===
Republican primary results
Party	Candidate	Votes	%
Republican	Ken Paxton	569,034	44.45%
Republican	Dan Branch	428,325	33.46%
Republican	Barry Smitherman	282,701	22.08%
Total votes		1,280,060	100.00%

Runoff results map by county: Paxton: 50–60% 60–70% 70–80% 80–90%; Branch: 50–60% 60–70% 70–80% 80–90%

=== Runoff results ===
Republican primary runoff results
Party	Candidate	Votes	%
Republican	Ken Paxton	466,224	63.63%
Republican	Dan Branch	266,539	36.37%
Total votes		732,763	100.00%

== Democratic primary ==
=== Candidates ===
==== Nominee ====
- Sam Houston, attorney and nominee for Texas Supreme Court Justice Place 7 in 2008

=== Results ===
Democratic primary results
Party	Candidate	Votes	%
Democratic	Sam Houston	437,518	100.00%
Total votes		437,518	100.00%

== Libertarian primary ==
=== Candidates ===
==== Nominee ====
- Jamie Balagia

==== Eliminated in primary ====
- Tom Glass, Vice Chair of the Libertarian Party of Texas

== Green primary ==
=== Candidates ===
==== Nominee ====
- Jamar Osborne

== General election ==
=== Polling ===
Poll source	Date(s) administered	Sample size	Margin of error	Ken Paxton (R)	Sam Houston (D)	Other	Undecided
UoT/Texas Tribune	October 10–19, 2014	866	± 3.6%	54%	34%	12% (Note: Jamie Balagia (L) with 8%; Jamar Osborne (G) with 4%)	—
UoT/Texas Tribune	May 30–June 8, 2014	1,200	± 2.83%	40%	27%	6% (Note: Jamie Balagia (L) with 3%; Jamar Osborne (G) with 3%)	27%

=== Results ===
2014 Texas Attorney General election
Party	Candidate	Votes	%
Republican	Ken Paxton	2,742,646	58.81%
Democratic	Sam Houston	1,773,108	38.02%
Libertarian	Jamie Balagia	118,186	2.53%
Green	Jamar Osborne	29,590	0.63%
Majority		969,538	20.79%
Total votes		4,663,530	100.00%
Turnout			24.65%
Republican hold			

== See also ==
- Texas Attorney General
