= 2016 Texas elections =

- November 8, 2016

Elections were held in Texas on Tuesday, November 8, 2016. Primaries were held on March 1, 2016, with runoffs taking place on May 24, 2016.

In addition to the US Presidential Race, Texas voters elected 1 of 3 members of the Texas Railroad Commission, 8 of 15 members of the Texas Board of Education, all of its seats to the House of Representatives, 3 of 9 seats on the Supreme Court of Texas, 3 of 9 seats on the Texas Court of Criminal Appeals, 20 of 80 seats on the Texas Appellate Courts, all of the seats of the Texas House of Representatives and 16 of 34 seats in the Texas State Senate.

== Federal Offices ==
=== President of The United States ===
Texas had 38 electoral votes in the Electoral College.

=== United States House of Representatives ===
There were 36 U.S. Representatives in Texas up for election.

== Railroad Commissioner ==
2016 Texas Railroad Commissioner election
- November 8, 2016
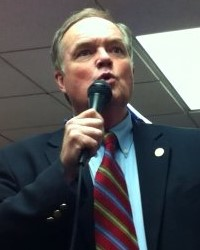

Nominee	Wayne Christian	Grady Yarbrough	Mark Miller
Party	Republican	Democratic	Libertarian
Popular vote	4,648,841	3,362,041	462,251
Percentage	53.07%	38.38%	5.28%
- Christian: 40–50% 50–60% 60–70% 70–80% 80–90% >90% Yarbrough: 40–50% 50–60% 60–70% 70–80% 80–90% >90% Miller: >90% Salinas: >90% Tie: 40–50% 50% No data
Railroad Commissioner before election
David Porter
Republican
Elected Railroad Commissioner
Wayne Christian
Republican

Incumbent Republican commissioner David Porter did not run for re-election. Republican Wayne Christian won election to succeed him, defeating Democrat Grady Yarbrough, Libertarian Mark Miller, and Green Martina Salinas.

=== General election ===
==== Endorsements ====
Mark Miller (L)

Newspapers

- Corpus Christi Caller-Times
- The Dallas Morning News
- Fort Worth Star-Telegram
- Houston Chronicle
- San Antonio Express-News

==== Results ====
2016 Texas Railroad Commissioner election
Party	Candidate	Votes	%	±%
Republican	Wayne Christian	4,648,841	53.07%	−6.34%
Democratic	Grady Yarbrough	3,362,041	38.38%	+2.14%
Libertarian	Mark Miller	462,251	5.28%	+2.41%
Green	Martina Salinas	287,105	3.28%	+1.79%
Total votes		8,760,238	100.0%	
Republican hold				
