= David M. Medina =

American judge

David Michael Medina
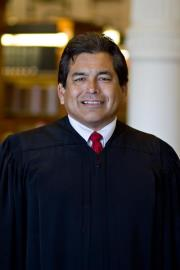

Justice of the Supreme Court of Texas
- In office November 10, 2004 – December 31, 2012
- Appointed by: Rick Perry
- Preceded by: Wallace B. Jefferson
- Succeeded by: John P. Devine

Personal details
- Born: July 23, 1958 (age 67) Galveston, Texas, U.S.
- Party: Republican
- Education: Texas State University (BS); South Texas College of Law Houston (JD)
- Occupation: Attorney

David Michael Medina (born July 23, 1958) is a former Justice of the nine-member Texas Supreme Court. He served in the Place 4 position. He was appointed by Governor Rick Perry in 2004 and subsequently elected to a full-term in 2006. Medina was defeated in the Republican runoff election in 2012 by John P. Devine. His tenure ended on December 31, 2012.

== Appointment to the court and professional experience ==
Justice Medina succeeded Wallace B. Jefferson in Place 4 after Jefferson was appointed to be Chief Justice following the retirement of Tom Phillips. Governor Perry named Justice Medina to the court on November 10, 2004. Justice Medina had been Perry's General Counsel for the preceding ten months.

Before that, Justice Medina was Associate General Counsel for Cooper Industries in Houston from 2000 to 2004 and Litigation Counsel from 1987 to 1996. He served on the 157th State District Court bench in Harris County from 1996 to 2000 after appointment in May 1996 by then-Governor George W. Bush. Justice Medina was elected in November 1996 and again in November 1998. He was the first Hispanic Republican district judge elected in Harris County. The Houston Bar Association voted him as one of the top jurists in Harris County.

Justice Medina rejoined Cooper in 2000 as Associate General Counsel, Litigation, responsible for supervising Cooper's litigation and product-safety matters throughout the world. In January 2004, he left Cooper to become General Counsel to Governor Perry.

Justice Medina is a Shareholder at Chamberlain Hrdlicka law firm in Houston, Texas.

== Election to the Texas Supreme Court ==
Justice Medina was elected in 2006 without a Democratic opponent. Unopposed for the Republican nomination that year, he handily defeated his Libertarian Party challenger, Jerry Adkins, 2,558,036 (75.5 percent) to 830,780 (24.5 percent).

== Background and education ==
Justice Medina was born on Galveston Island, attended public schools in Hitchcock and graduated with a Bachelor of Science degree from Texas State University–San Marcos in 1980. In college, he competed on the university's karate and baseball teams and was on the Dean's List. In 1989, he earned his Juris Doctor degree from South Texas College of Law in Houston. He was on the Dean's List and a member of the American Bar Association Regional Moot Court National Championship Team. In 2017, Justice Medina earned his Master of Laws (LL.M) from the University of Texas at Austin.

Justice Medina is a former board member of Habitat for Humanity and Houston Metro and the Spring Klein Baseball Association. He has also served as an adjunct professor for South Texas College of Law, where he taught advanced civil trial litigation.

In 2017, Justice Medina was inducted into the Texas State University - San Marcos Martial Arts Hall of Fame. He is also a member of the U.S. Martial Arts Hall of Fame.

South Texas College of Law Alumni Association presented Justice Medina with its Outstanding Public Service Award in 2012.

In 2011, Justice Medina served as Advisor to the University of Texas - Austin Hispanic National Bar Association National Championship Moot Court Team.

In 2010, Justice Medina was recognized at Justice of the Year by the Hispanic National Bar Association and Texas Justice of the Year by the Mexican American Bar Association of Texas Foundation. The P.O.L.I.C.E. (Police Officers Looking into Court Room Excellence) recognized Justice Medina as its Texas Supreme Court Justice of the Year in 2005.

Justice Medina is a Fellow of the State Bar of Texas, the Pro Bono College of Texas, and an Access to Justice Defender.

Justice Medina is a 4th Degree Black Belt in Kajukenbo and a 1st Degree Black Belt in Taekwondo.

== Grand Jury ==
Medina faced an indictment by a Harris County grand jury in connection with a fire at his home, but charges were eventually dropped.

The indictment was dismissed by State District Court Judge Brian Rains, at the request of then Harris County District Attorney Chuck Rosenthal. The dismissal prompted the grand jury foreman, Robert Ryan, to publicly threaten to re-issue the charge, which some subsequent reports characterized as unusual given the grand juror's requirement of secrecy. Rosenthal, who thereafter resigned as district attorney, said that the evidence was insufficient to support the indictment.

Dick DeGuerin, the Medinas' attorney explained that the Medinas did not start the fire and "didn't have anything to gain. That was their dream house."

== Texas Open Beaches Act ==
In 2012, Justice Medina "wrote a persuasive dissent in the court's recent wrong-headed ruling on the Texas Open Beaches Act." Medina's dissent, which protects the public's ability to access beaches, was well received. In contrast, the majority decision was criticized by Texas Attorney General Greg Abbott as being based on "nothing."

== Some other notable opinions ==
- Irving Marks v. St. Luke's Episcopal Hospital, August 28, 2009
- In re Morgan Stanley, July 3, 2009
- City of San Antonio v. Pollock, (dissenting opinion), May 1, 2009
- North Texas Pentecostal Church/Pleasant Glade Assembly of God vs. Laura Schubert, June 27, 2008
- TXI v. Hughes, March 12, 2010

== Election of 2012 ==
In the May 29, 2012 Republican primary Medina faced two challengers, including former state district court Judge John Devine, who is best known for his refusal to remove a posting of the Ten Commandments from his courtroom. Justice Medina received more votes than his two opponents but not enough to avoid a run-off.

On July 31, 2012, Medina lost his bid for re-election, after John Devine polled 498,937 votes (53.3 percent) to Justice Medina's 437,637 ballots (46.7 percent). Running without Democratic opposition, Devine easily prevailed in the November 6 general election. He succeeded Justice Medina on the court in January 2013.

== See also ==
- List of Hispanic and Latino American jurists

Legal offices
Preceded by Wallace B. Jefferson	Texas Supreme Court Justice, Place 4; 2004–2012	Succeeded by John P. Devine
