= 2014 Texas Comptroller of Public Accounts election =

- November 4, 2014
- Turnout: 32.8%▲2.7%
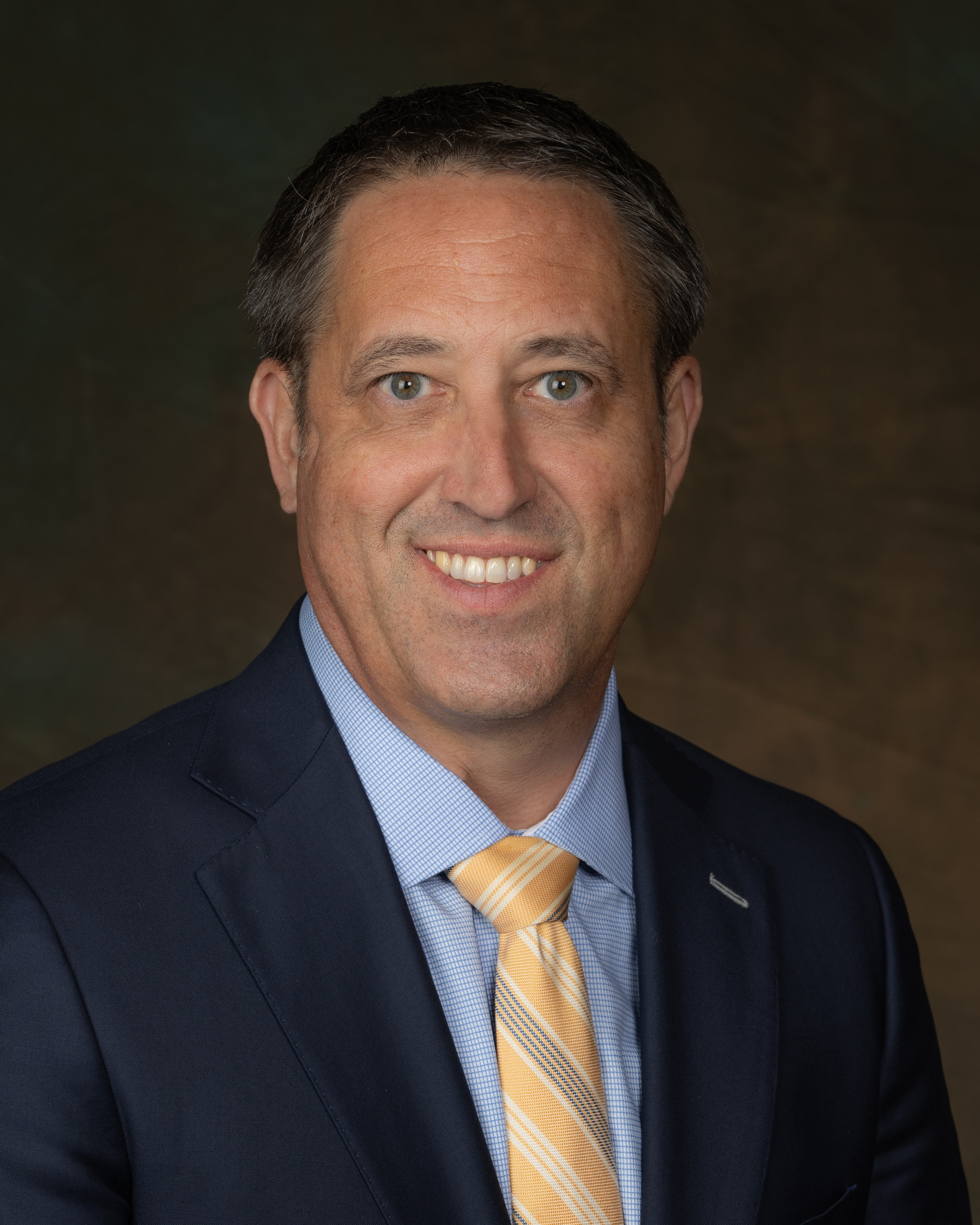

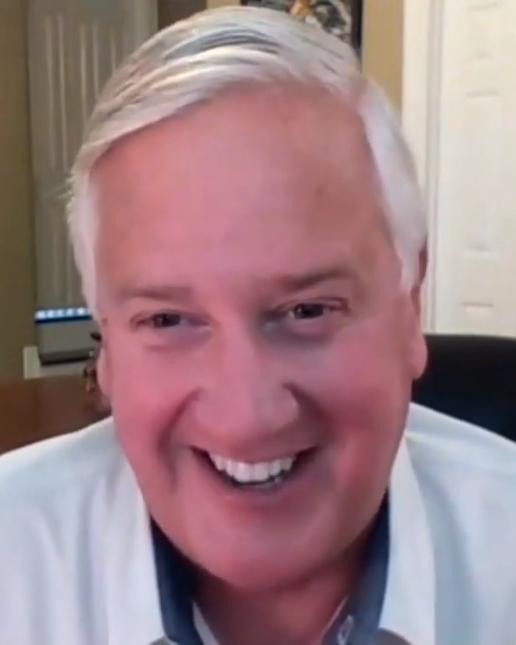
Nominee	Glenn Hegar	Mike Collier
Party	Republican	Democratic
Popular vote	2,692,803	1,739,308
Percentage	58.3%	37.7%
- County results Hegar: 40–50% 50–60% 60–70% 70–80% 80–90% >90% Collier: 40–50% 50–60% 60–70% 70–80% 80–90%
Comptroller before election
Glenn Hegar
Republican
Elected Comptroller
Glenn Hegar
Republican

The 2014 Texas Comptroller of Public Accounts election took place on November 4, 2014, to elect the comptroller of public accounts of Texas. Incumbent Republican comptroller Susan Combs retired and did not seek a third term in office. State senator Glenn Hegar emerged as the winner of a crowded Republican primary, while businessman Mike Collier won the Democratic nomination unopposed. Hegar won the general election in a landslide, earning 58% of the vote to Collier's 38%.

== Republican primary ==
=== Candidates ===
Declared

- Glenn Hegar, state senator
- Harvey Hilderbran, state representative
- Debra Medina, activist and candidate for governor in 2010
- Raul Torres, former state representative

Declined

- Susan Combs, Comptroller of Public Accounts

=== Polling ===
Poll source	Date(s) administered	Sample size	Margin of error	Glenn Hegar	Harvey Hilderbran	Debra Medina	Raul Torres	Other	Undecided
UoT/Texas Tribune	February 7–17, 2014	461	±4.56%	24%	26%	39%	11%	—	—
UoT/Texas Tribune	October 18–27, 2013	519	±5.02%	4%	2%	14%	5%	—	75%

=== Results ===
Republican primary results
Party	Candidate	Votes	%
Republican	Glenn Hegar	612,269	49.99
Republican	Harvey Hilderbran	318,899	26.04
Republican	Debra Medina	236,531	19.31
Republican	Raul Torres	56,937	4.64
Total votes		1,224,636	100

A runoff was to be held, but with Hegar only narrowly below the 50% threshold and with several thousand provisional and overseas ballots to be counted, Hildebran withdrew on March 7, 2014, and endorsed Hegar. When the final results were released, Hegar had come only 50 votes short of winning the primary outright.

== Democratic primary ==
=== Candidates ===
Declared

- Mike Collier, businessman and accountant

== Libertarian nomination ==
=== Candidates ===
Declared

- Ben Sanders

== Green nomination ==
=== Candidates ===
Declared

- Deb Shafto, nominee for Governor in 2010

== General election ==
=== Polling ===
Poll source	Date(s) administered	Sample size	Margin of error	Glenn Hegar (R)	Mike Collier (D)	Other	Undecided
UoT/Texas Tribune	October 10–19, 2014	866	± 3.6%	49%	34%	17%	—
UoT/Texas Tribune	May 30–June 8, 2014	1,200	± 2.83%	32%	25%	7%	37%

=== Results ===
Texas Comptroller of Public Accounts election, 2014
Party	Candidate	Votes	%	±%
Republican	Glenn Hegar	2,692,803	58.36	▼24.80
Democratic	Mike Collier	1,739,308	37.69	N/A
Libertarian	Ben Sanders	136,969	2.96	▼7.54
Green	Deb Shafto	44,924	0.97	▼5.37
Majority		953,495	20.67	
Total votes		4,614,004	100.00	▲16.00
Turnout			32.89	▲2.92
Republican hold				

== See also ==
- Texas Comptroller of Public Accounts
