= 2002 Texas Comptroller of Public Accounts election =

- November 5, 2002
- Turnout: 35.7%
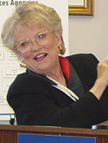

Nominee	Carole Keeton Rylander	Marty Akins
Party	Republican	Democratic
Popular vote	2,878,732	1,476,976
Percentage	64.1%	32.9%
- County results Rylander: 40–50% 50–60% 60–70% 70–80% 80–90% >90% Atkins: 40–50% 50–60% 60–70% 70–80% 80–90%
Comptroller before election
Carole Keeton Rylander
Republican
Elected Comptroller
Carole Keeton Rylander
Republican

The 2002 Texas Comptroller of Public Accounts election took place on November 5, 2002, to elect the Comptroller of Public Accounts of Texas. Incumbent Republican comptroller Carole Keeton Rylander ran for re-election to a second term, and won the Republican primary unopposed. In the Democratic primary, former Texas Longhorns quarterback Marty Akins won the nomination unopposed. Rylander won the general election in a landslide, earning 64% of the vote to Atkins' 33%.

== Republican primary ==
=== Candidates ===
- Carole Keeton Rylander, incumbent Texas Comptroller

=== Results ===
Republican primary results
Party	Candidate	Votes	%
Republican	Carole Keeton Rylander (inc.)	562,283	100.00
Total votes		562,283	100.0

== Democratic primary ==
=== Candidates ===
- Marty Akins (D), former quarterback for the Texas Longhorns (1973–1975)

Democratic primary results
Party	Candidate	Votes	%
Democratic	Marty Akins	687,104	100.0%
Total votes		687,104	100.0%

== General election ==
=== Candidates ===
- Carole Keeton Rylander (R), incumbent Texas Comptroller
- Marty Akins (D), former quarterback for the Texas Longhorns (1973–1975)
- Ruben Reyes (G)
- Bowie Ibarra (L)

=== Results ===
2002 election for Comptroller of Public Accounts
Party	Candidate	Votes	%	±%
Republican	Carole Keeton Rylander (inc.)	2,878,732	64.16	
Democratic	Marty Akins	1,476,976	32.92	
Green	Ruben L. Reyes	77,177	1.72	
Libertarian	Bowie Ibarra	53,614	1.20	
Majority		1,401,756	31.24	
Total votes		4,486,499	100.00	
Republican hold				

== See also ==
- Texas Comptroller of Public Accounts
