= Sharon Keller =

American judge (born 1953)

Presiding Judge of the Texas Court of Criminal Appeals
- In office January 1, 2001 – December 31, 2024
- Preceded by: Michael McCormick
- Succeeded by: David Schenck

Personal details
- Born: August 1, 1953 (age 73)
- Party: Republican
- Spouse: Hunt Batjer (Divorced)
- Children: 1
- Education: Rice University (BA); Southern Methodist University (JD)

Sharon Faye Keller (born August 1, 1953) is an American lawyer and former judge who served as the presiding judge of the Texas Court of Criminal Appeals. A member of the Republican Party, Keller was first elected to the court in 1994 and became presiding judge in 2000. She served as presiding judge until 2020 and continued as a judge on the court until her retirement in 2021.

== Education and early career ==
Born in Texas, Keller graduated from Rice University in Houston in 1975 with a major in philosophy and obtained her Juris Doctor in 1978 from Southern Methodist University School of Law.

According to Texas Monthly, when Keller was asked in a preelection interview if she was bound to follow the law, even if it meant an unjust result. "Absolutely ... Who is going to determine what justice is? Me? I think justice is achieved by following the law", she replied. "She's extremely religious ... [S]he believes strongly that God is on her side", said one colleague. "Her commitment to her religion was enormous", stated another friend.

She is chairman of the Texas Task Force on Indigent Defense. She serves on the executive board of the Capitol Area Council of the Boy Scouts of America.

In 2000, Keller was challenged in the Republican primary election for the presiding judge slot of the Court of Criminal Appeals by sitting Judge Tom Price of Dallas. Keller prevailed, 122,958 (54.8 percent) to Price's 101,514 votes (45.2 percent). Price continued serving on the court until his retirement in 2015.

== Notable cases ==
=== Cesar Fierro case ===
In 1996, Keller wrote her first major opinion (for a 5–4 majority), which denied a new trial to Cesar Fierro, who had confessed to murdering an El Paso cab driver, Nicholas Castanon. It had been revealed after trial that the Ciudad Juárez police had threatened to torture the defendant's mother and stepfather unless he confessed. A detective, Al Medrano, was aware that the confession had been coerced but denied it at trial. However, he later filed an affidavit admitting his perjury. The prosecutor and the trial judge agreed that Fierro deserved a new trial; however Keller and the CCA disagreed.

A laborer born in Ciudad Juárez, Mexico, and reared on both sides of the border, Fierro was arrested when Gerardo Olague, a 16-year-old, implicated him five months after Castanon's slaying. Olague testified that Castanon had agreed to give him (Olague) and Fierro a ride to Ciudad Juárez, and Fierro shot and killed Castanon on the way there. Fierro was in an El Paso jail when police questioned him about the Castanon murder. He later alleged that during the questioning local police coerced his confession by threatening to harm his parents, who they said were being held hostage in Mexico by Juárez detectives. Fierro said in a recent interview from Death Row in Livingston: "He told me if I signed, then they'd let them go, and if not, they were going to torture them." At Fierro's trial, Ciudad Juárez and El Paso police denied any wrongdoing.

In the opinion, Keller accepted the trial court's conclusion of law that "there was a strong likelihood that the defendant's confession had been coerced by the actions of the Juárez police and by the knowledge and acquiescence [sic] of those actions by Detective Medrano." Although she acknowledged that Fierro's "due process rights were violated", she concluded that "the error was harmless" and denied the motion for a new trial. She indicated that the "knowing use of perjured testimony" is trial error and that applicant had to prove harm by a preponderance of evidence. In addition to the confession, the State also had the testimony of Olague. The opinion held that it was more probable that the outcome of the trial would have been the same without the confession.

Judges Clinton, Maloney, Charlie Baird, and Morris Overstreet all dissented. Overstreet called a confession the "most powerful piece of evidence" a prosecutor can offer. He said it was "totally inconceivable" that Fierro's confession had not convinced the jurors of his guilt. Maloney and Overstreet felt that the burden should have been on the State to show that the "perjured testimony" was harmless. Regardless, they felt Fierro had proved harm by a preponderance of evidence. They pointed out that the prosecutor had testified that had he known the confession was coerced, he would have joined a motion to suppress it which he felt would have been granted. Without the confession, he would then not have proceeded with the prosecution unless he could have corroborated Olague's testimony because he felt Olague was "not the most credible witness". The dissenters believed this demonstrated that the prosecutor considered the confession to be critical. Further, in the Supreme Court case the majority cited to support its claim that the perjured testimony was subject to a harmless error analysis, "the Supreme Court recognized that some trial errors may be so egregious as to entitle an applicant to relief even if the error could not be shown to affect the jury's verdict".

=== Roy Criner case ===
==== Origins ====
In the evening of September 27, 1986, Roy Criner, a logger from New Caney, Texas, allegedly told his boss (Pitts) and two friends (Hooker and Ringo), that he had picked up a hitchhiker, driven her to Pitts' logging facility, threatened to kill her with a screwdriver, raped her, and thrown her out of the truck. Their testimony was not uniform. Ringo later testified that Criner did not specify when the events with the girl took place, while Hooker thought Criner said Friday night; Ringo testified that Criner did not say explicitly that he raped and killed her, while Hooker attributed the rape claim to him, and that Criner had picked the hitchhiker up at a store in New Caney.

Earlier that evening, ninth grader Deanna Ogg stopped at a store in New Caney to buy cigarettes and told the cashier that "she was going to a party." Approximately fifteen minutes before Criner told Pitts tale version of the evening's events, Ogg's body was found near the logging facility; she had been raped, beaten, and stabbed. The medical examiner concluded that the wounds could have been made with a screwdriver, "among other things". Five days later, having interviewed Pitts, Hooker, and Ringo, and having found a screwdriver in Criner's truck (he had consented to it being searched), the police arrested Criner for the murder. The murder charge was dropped for lack of evidence, however, and aggravated sexual assault was substituted.

When the case came to trial in 1990, prosecutors relied primarily on testimony by Pitts, Hooker, and Ringo about Criner's statements to them. Other evidence—including a cigarette butt found at the scene (Criner didn't smoke, and the brand wasn't Ogg's), and, to the "amaze[ment]" of the appellate court, the screwdriver itself—was not introduced. Prosecutor David Walker "failed to tell the jury, or the defense, that the screwdriver had been examined and tested [and showed no tie to the crime], though no written record of any test existed," and District Attorney Mike McDougal claimed it was never tested. In sum, the state had 27 pieces of forensic evidence, none of which connected Criner to the crime. Criner's defense lawyers told the Houston Press and Frontline that they believed the evidence against their client "was so shaky that a jury would never convict" so they put on no defense witnesses and did not adequately cross-examine Pitts, who told Frontline that there was no way Criner had time to commit the murder. Nevertheless, Criner was convicted and sentenced to 99 years.

On appeal, Criner claimed the evidence was insufficient to convict him of rape and insufficient to prove that he was responsible for the aggravating element, i.e. the head injury to Ogg. A majority of the intermediate appellate court agreed with his second claim and thus did not rule on his first one. A majority of the Texas Court of Criminal Appeals reversed, and the conviction became final.

==== The new DNA evidence ====
In 1997, the semen found in Ogg was subjected to newly-available DNA testing; it was not Criner's. Criner filed a habeas corpus petition for a new trial, advancing two arguments: an "actual innocence" claim based on the new DNA evidence, and a Brady claim. The following year, the district court declined to make factual findings on the actual innocence claim, but recommended Criner receive a new trial on the basis of the Brady claim.

On May 16, 1998, the court in a 5–3 decision, overturned the district court's recommendation without written comment "[b]ecause there is overwhelming, direct evidence that establishes that [Criner] sexually assaulted the victim in this case..."

After Baird filed a dissent, Keller issued a written opinion on behalf of the majority. The court dismissed the Brady claim, and focused on the "actual innocence" claim." The majority felt that the DNA evidence was irrelevant: "Evidence that the victim had sexual relations with someone other than [Criner] simply is not evidence that [he] is innocent." The opinion states that "[t]here was testimony that the victim had had many boyfriends and that she 'loved sex.'" However, the opinion does not dispute Baird's assertion that the state did not put on evidence of Ogg's promiscuity at trial. Mike McDougal, the district attorney, denies that his office ever "impugned the reputation of Ogg" and claims not to know where Keller got information about the victim's purported promiscuity. However, the motion he filed in opposing a new trial for Criner, included an affidavit from D.A. investigator John Stephenson that stated he had reviewed "the offense reports in the case," and "One report reflects that the deceased had lots of boyfriends and was very sexually active."

The court agreed with arguments made by the state during the habeas hearing that the absence of Criner's semen could be explained by use of a condom or coitus interruptus and that the state could "produce evidence that the victim had had sexual relations with men other than the applicant", and concluded that "[t]he DNA evidence shows merely that the victim had sex[ ] with someone other than [Criner] at a time relatively near her death. It does not and cannot exclude the possibility that she also had sex[ ] with [Criner]."

After the case was decided, Keller, Baird, Joel Albrecht, the foreman of the trial jury, were among those interviewed by Frontline. Keller emphasized the importance of the finality of judgments, and said that Criner had not unquestionably established he was innocent, the applicable standard according to her. She reiterated that the "DNA evidence establishes that someone else had sex with this girl, who was promiscuous." She added: "DNA evidence means different things in different contexts. It's like fingerprint evidence. If someone's fingerprints are at the scene of a crime, that means the person was there at some time or another. But if his fingerprints aren't there, it doesn't prove that he's innocent of a crime committed at that scene, especially if he's told people that he committed the crime[, as allegedly Criner had]." She also stated that an appellate court "look[s] at [new evidence] to see whether it would have made a difference in their verdict. If it would, he gets a new trial. If it wouldn't, then he doesn't." The Frontline interviewer responded "But you are not the jury."

Albrecht disagreed with Keller's majority opinion and stated: "I don't understand how the court could say what we would do. It would be impossible. I personally think if the DNA came forth stating that it was negative, that the verdict would not have been guilty."

Baird disputed that Criner had "confessed" to the crime (Criner's statements to his friends "did not describe the young lady, or the location, and did not necessarily even describe a sexual act that was consistent with the accusations against [him],"). Further he pointed out that the state did not introduce any evidence at trial to establish Ogg's promiscuity. He accused the state of reversing itself, because it had originally argued that Ogg had not had sex with anybody besides Criner. Further, he pointed out that neither "failure to ejaculate" nor "use of a condom" arguments were presented to the jury at trial which the state does not dispute. He emphasized that juries were the heart of the judicial system.

In 2009, Texas Monthly said of this interview that Keller appeared to have considered the DNA evidence "a technicality". The Dallas News said she "offered a clumsy, embarrassing rationale of her decision on national television." Tom Price, who ran for Chief Judge in a primary election, said that Keller's Criner opinion had made the court a "national laughingstock." Judge Mansfield, who had sided with the majority in denying Criner a hearing, told the Chicago Tribune that, after watching the Frontline documentary, reviewing briefs and considering the case at some length, he voted "the wrong way" and would change his vote if he could. "Judges, like anyone else, can make mistakes ... I hope I get a chance to fix it." He stated that he hoped Criner's lawyers filed a new appeal as he felt Criner deserved a new trial.

Following the CCA's refusal to order a new trial, the cigarette butt found at the scene (and not adduced at trial) was subjected to DNA testing. The DNA on the cigarette was not a match for Criner, but it was a match for the semen found in Ogg. Ogg's DNA was also found on the cigarette, indicating that she shared a cigarette with the person who had sex with her (and who presumably killed her). These results convinced the district attorney, local sheriff and the trial judge that Criner was not guilty. The Texas Board of Pardons and Paroles recommended he be pardoned and, citing "credible new evidence [that] raises substantial doubt about [Criner's] guilt", then-Governor George W. Bush pardoned him in 2000.

=== Michael Richard case ===
==== Background ====
Michael Wayne Richard, a convicted rapist and murderer, was scheduled to be executed by Texas on September 25, 2007. That day, the U.S. Supreme Court refused a last-minute challenge to Richard's execution. The same morning, however, the court granted review in Baze v. Rees, a Kentucky case challenging the constitutionality of the lethal injection protocol used in both that state and Texas (the court later rejected the challenge). Richard's lawyers, the Texas Defender Service ("TDS") wanted a stay of execution pending decision of Baze.

Meanwhile, at the court, the judges – aware of the impending Richards execution and the Supreme Court's intention to hear Baze – polled themselves and were 5–4 against granting a stay to Richards. The court's General Counsel, Edward Marty, began drafting an order denying the motion while Judge Tom Price began drafting a dissent. Sometime after lunch Keller left the office to meet her repairman at home. The court clerk, after receiving the call from a TDS paralegal, called Marty, who in turn called Keller to ask if the clerk's office could stay open late. What Marty told Keller about the request is unclear and disputed, although Keller claims she did understand that the call was about the Richard execution. She told Marty that the clerk's office closes at 5, and Richard was executed later that night.

Keller maintains that it has long been precedent in Texas for late appeals to be hand-delivered to the court or a judge, and that it was not required for them to be filed with the clerk. Rule 9.2(a) of the Texas Rules of Appellate Procedure permits either form of filing, and another court judge, Cheryl Johnson, was on call to receive such last-minute appeals. Even with the clerk's office closed, and even had Johnson been unavailable, Keller's lawyer says, Rule 9 would have allowed TDS to file the motion with any judge of the court: "'There were 11 doors available to ... [the defense, and t]hey knocked on only one' by calling the deputy clerk and nobody else...." On the other hand, prosecutors point to Rule 9.6, which directs that "Parties and counsel may communicate with the appellate court about a case only through the clerk." The two rules appear to be at odds.

==== State Commission on Judicial Conduct charges ====
More than 300 lawyers signed on to official judicial complaints about Keller's actions to both the State Bar of Texas and the Texas State Commission on Judicial Conduct. The Texas Court of Criminal Appeals subsequently changed its rules to allow for late submissions in death penalty cases and other emergency situations, and recently enabled filing in death penalty execution cases and certain other emergency situations. On February 19, 2009, the State Commission on Judicial Conduct charged Keller with five counts of misconduct. The commission charged Keller with dereliction of duty, denying Richard his right to access to the courts and incompetence in office. It wrote that Keller's actions constituted "willful or persistent conduct that casts public discredit on the judiciary". The Commission voted to initiate formal proceedings against Keller that included a public trial starting on August 17, 2009, before a Special Master appointed by the Texas Supreme Court.

Keller's attorneys claimed that TDS "could have easily filed the appeal by calling the on-duty judge", and, as Johnson later testified, "communications about his execution should have gone to her under the CCA's execution-day protocol," they did not contact Johnson (or any other judge of the court), instead pursuing the clerk by cell phone. Johnson testified that she "didn't learn about the request for more time until four days after Richard was executed," although that claim was disputed during Keller's ethics charge hearing. But Keller didn't call Johnson, either, and when Keller's actions were later questioned, both Johnson and prosecutors for the Judicial Conduct Commission charged that Keller violated an ethical duty by failing to inform Johnson of her conversation with the clerk, or directing the request to Johnson. The inmate's attorney at TDS was questioned as to why he failed to file at least a handwritten motion for stay of execution before or after 5 pm; had he filed the motion, even if rejected, he would have been able to demonstrate to the US Supreme Court that the state appeals process had been exhausted.

Keller testified at her hearing that in hindsight she would do nothing differently.

The Commission on July 16, 2010, issued a "Public Warning" to Keller. The commission's order said, "by failing to require or assure that staff subject to her direction and control complied with the execution-day procedures on September 25, 2007, Judge Keller interfered with Richard's access to court and right to a hearing as required by law." The commission said the public warning was issued "in condemnation" of Keller's conduct, which it said "casts public discredit on the judiciary or the administration of justice" and "constitutes willful or persistent conduct that is clearly inconsistent with the proper performance of her duties as a judge of the Court of Criminal Appeals." On appeal, the Public Warning and the charges against Judge Keller were dismissed on October 11, 2010, by a special court of review.

==== Result ====
Special Master David Berchelmann of the Texas 37th Judicial District, issued his findings of fact on January 20, 2010. He concluded that "there is a valid reason why many in the legal community are not proud of Judge Keller's actions" but that she had violated no law or ethical rule, and recommended no further sanction against Keller "beyond the public humiliation she has surely suffered". Moreover, while Keller should have referred execution-related requests to Johnson, she had good reason to believe that the request was an operational question within her bailiwick as Chief Judge rather than an execution-related question within Johnson's. The report found that TDS, not Keller, bore "the bulk of fault for what occurred". After its litany of execution day blunders, TDS sought absolution by engaging in a "distorti[ng]" campaign of disinformation to "tr[y] th[e] case in the media," "causing a public uproar against Judge Keller, much of which was unwarranted." The report also acknowledges that there is no evidence in the record supporting the computer problems that allegedly delayed the preparation of TDS' motion.

==== Impeachment proceedings ====
Texas State Representative Lon Burnam filed a resolution in the Texas Legislature on February 16, 2009, calling for the impeachment of Keller for "neglect of duty" in regard to her actions involving Michael Richard's appeal. Burnam said: "It's one thing for a banker to close shop at 5 o'clock sharp. But a public official who stands between a human being and the death chamber must be held to a higher standard." On February 19, 2009, The New York Times endorsed a legislative inquiry, and opined that "If the facts are as reported, Judge Keller should be removed from the bench."

=== Governor Rick Perry case ===
In February 2016, Judge Keller and the court majority, 7–2, threw out the last remaining charge against former Governor Rick Perry, ruling that he did not commit a crime when in 2013 he threatened to halt funds to the public integrity unit in Travis County unless the district attorney, Rosemary Lehmberg, a Democrat caught for drunk driving, resigned.

The complaint against Perry was filed by the liberal advocacy group, Texans for Public Justice. A Travis County grand jury had indicted Perry on two counts. Perry's lawyers failed to convince Republican District Judge Bert Richardson, to throw out the indictments. Perry's lawyers then appeal to the Court of Appeals in Austin, which threw out one of the counts. In the lead 52-page opinion, Keller spoke of "criminal charges of dubious legal validity (and/or politically motivated origins)." Two judges dissented, Democrat Lawrence E. Meyers, a former Republican, and Republican Cheryl Johnson.

== Fine for failing to disclose assets ==
The Dallas Morning News reported on March 30, 2009, that Keller had "failed to abide by legal requirements that she disclose nearly $2 million in real estate holdings."

Keller sought to have the charges dismissed, saying it would be "financially ruinous" for her to pay a private attorney or law firm to fight the allegations. She amended her personal financial statement in April 2009 to disclose more than $2.4 million in property and income previously left out. Keller said that her failure to fully disclose her financial information stemmed from error and not a deliberate attempt to mislead. She "faces a civil and criminal complaint alleging she violated state ethics laws by failing to fully disclose her financial assets".

On April 30, 2010, the Texas Ethics Commission fined Keller $100,000 for failure to disclose more than $2 million in assets.

== 2012 judicial election ==
In 2012, Keller defeated her Democratic opponent, Keith Hampton, and retained her judgeship. She polled 4,245,148 votes (55.5 percent) to Hampton's 3,152,518 (41.2 percent). A Libertarian, Lance Stott, received the remaining 249,358 votes (3.26 percent).

== 2018 reelection ==
Keller was again reelected in the general election held on November 6, 2018. With 4,273,069 votes (52.3 percent), she defeated the Democrat Maria T. "Terri" Jackson, who polled 3,715,676 (45.4 percent). The remaining 188,678 ballots (2.3 percent) went to the Libertarian William Bryan Strange, III.

Keller has opposed the use of "actual innocence", demanding a higher bar of proof to exonerate prisoners who have been falsely convicted, and opposing compensating those for time spent falsely imprisoned.

Legal offices
Preceded by Michael McCormick	Presiding Judge of the Texas Court of Criminal Appeals; 2001–2025	Succeeded by David Schenck
