= Barbara Parker Hervey =

American judge (born 1953)

Judge of the Texas Court of Criminal Appeals
- In office January 1, 2001 – December 31, 2024
- Succeeded by: Gina Parker

Personal details
- Born: June 27, 1953 (age 71)
- Political party: Republican
- Spouse(s): William Hervey (divorced); Richard Langlois
- Children: 3
- Education: University of North Carolina, Greensboro (BA); St. Mary's University, Texas (JD)

Barbara Parker Hervey (born June 26, 1953) is a Judge of the Texas Court of Criminal Appeals; she holds the Place 7 seat.

== Background ==
Hervey earned her bachelor's degree in 1975 from the University of North Carolina at Greensboro, North Carolina, and her Juris Doctor on November 12, 1979 from St. Mary's University School of Law in San Antonio, Texas. Prior to becoming a judge, Hervey was an assistant criminal district attorney for Bexar County.

Hervey, a San Antonio resident, is currently a member of the State Bar of Texas and the American Law Institute. She is also Chair of Grants Committee for the Judicial and Court Personnel Training Fund.

== Texas Criminal Justice Integrity Unit ==
In 2008, Hervey created the Texas Criminal Justice Integrity Unit to educate those in the criminal justice system about problems with evidence in criminal prosecutions, which can lead to wrongful convictions. Some of the Unit's areas of focus include eyewitness identification, forensic science, and arson science.

== Election information ==
Hervey is a Republican who has won four elections, starting with her first in 2000.

In 2012, her third general election, Hervey drew 78 percent of the vote.

Hervey secured her fourth term on the appellate court in the general election held on November 6, 2018, but with a considerably reduced margin than in 2012. With 4,412,391votes (54.2 percent)), she defeated her Democratic opponent, Ramona Franklin, who polled 3,731,595 votes (45.8 percent). Franklin won Hervey's Bexar County by more than 71,000 votes.
