= John P. Devine (judge) =

American judge (born 1958)

John Devine

Justice of the Texas Supreme Court
- Incumbent
- Assumed office January 1, 2013
- Preceded by: David M. Medina

Personal details
- Born: John Phillip Devine; October 3, 1958 (age 67) Peru, Indiana, U.S.
- Party: Republican
- Spouse: Nubia Piedad Gomez (m. 1989)
- Children: 7
- Education: Ball State University (BA); South Texas College of Law (JD)
- Website: Office website Campaign website

John Phillip Devine (born October 3, 1958) is an American attorney and judge serving as a justice on the Supreme Court of Texas since 2013. A member of the Republican Party, he served as a Texas District Court judge from 1995 to 2002.

== Education ==
Devine graduated in 1980 with a degree in Business Administration and Marketing from Ball State University in Muncie, Indiana. He then joined Shell Oil in Houston, Texas and studied law at the South Texas College of Law in Downtown Houston. After earning his Juris Doctor degree in 1986, he went to work for Brown and Root.

== Political career ==
Devine was an anti-abortion activist in the 1980s. At a June 2012 rally, Devine said he had been arrested 37 times for protesting at abortion clinics.

Devine was district judge of the 190th Judicial District Court in Harris County from 1995 through 2002. When he first ran for district judge in 1994, Devine was unopposed in the Republican primary, and narrowly won the general election, unseating Democratic incumbent, Eileen F. O'Neill, 289,943 (50.5 percent) to 284,246 (49.5 percent). Devine was re-elected to a second term on the district court bench in 1998, with 261,514 votes (52.8 percent), defeating Democrat Jane Fraser, who polled 233,597 (47.2 percent). Devine did not seek a third term in 2002.

In 2004, Devine was sued for his refusal to take down a painting of The Ten Commandments on display in his Harris County courtroom. The case drew national attention.

Devine ran for a seat on the Texas Supreme Court in 2012, defeating incumbent David M. Medina in a primary runoff election held on July 31, 2012. Devine was then elected without a Democratic Party opponent in the general election on November 6, 2012. His term began on January 1, 2013.

In 2024, Devine criticized his colleagues on the Supreme Court of Texas after the court refused to allow Jeff Younger to block his ex-wife from moving to California.

== Personal life ==
He is married to Nubia Piedad Gomez, formerly of Venezuela. They have six children, four boys and two girls.

Devine and his wife continued a high-risk pregnancy for their seventh child even though the pregnancy was likely to cause the death of both the mother and the child, according to Devine. His wife survived the pregnancy but the child died an hour after birth.

Legal offices
Preceded by David M. Medina	Justice of the Texas Supreme Court; 2012–present	Incumbent
