= Libertarian Party of Texas =

State affiliate of the Libertarian Party

The Libertarian Party of Texas
- Chairperson: Andrew Amelang
- Founded: 1971
- Headquarters: PO Box 1766 Austin, Texas 78767
- Ideology: Libertarianism
- National affiliation: Libertarian Party
- Colors: Gold and Blue
- Texas Senate: 0 / 31
- Texas House of Representatives: 0 / 150
- U.S. Senate (Texas): 0 / 2
- U.S. House of Representatives (Texas): 0 / 38
- Other elected officials: 0 (June 2024)

Website
- www.lptexas.org

The Libertarian Party of Texas (abbreviated LPTexas) is the state affiliate of the Libertarian Party in the U.S. state of Texas. Founded in 1971, the party espouses a libertarian political ideology.

Under Texas state law, third-parties automatically obtain ballot access if any statewide candidate received at least 2% (previously 5%) of the vote in their race in any of the previous five general elections. The Libertarian Party has consistently maintained ballot access since 2004. The party does not hold primary elections, instead utilizing county, district, and state conventions to nominate candidates.

== History ==
In 1971, Texas was one of the 13 original founding state parties at the first Libertarian Party (LP) convention in Denver, Colorado. Over the next five years, county affiliate parties were founded in Travis, Harris, Dallas, and Bexar counties. In February 1980, Charles Fuller of Houston became the first Texas libertarian to appear on the ballot as a Libertarian Party candidate. (Previous candidates ran for write-in votes or as independents.) Fuller ran in a Special Election for State Representative District 80. The party first qualified for statewide ballot access in 1980, and then again on September 1, 1982, with 41,000 petition signatures. The party ran 122 candidates that November. Legal issues making signature collection more difficult prevented the party from achieving ballot access in 1984, but it was able to collect the required 32,000 signatures in 1986 to once again make it on the ballot. Three statewide candidates achieved at least 5% of the vote that November, automatically granting the party ballot access for 1988.

In the 1990 statewide elections, gubernatorial candidate Jeff Daiell (author of the novel, From Roundheel To Revolutionary) achieved 3.3% of the vote (129,128) and Comptroller candidate Gill Grisham received 5.8%, guaranteeing ballot access through 1994. Daiell's showing is currently the LP of Texas record in a gubernatorial race in terms of percentage; in 2018 Mark Tippetts broke the record for most votes. On March 9, 1998, U.S. District Judge James Nowlin stopped the State of Texas from requiring voter registration numbers alongside ballot access petition signatures in Pilcher v. Rains, brought by the Libertarian Party of Texas. In every election since except that of 2002, at least one of the party's candidates achieved 5% of the vote, guaranteeing ballot access.

In May 2004, the party easily met the state's signature requirement. In the November 2006 elections, the party ran 168 candidates, and easily secured ballot access for 2008 in two-way races for state judicial positions, with the highest vote total going to Jerry Adkins for Supreme Court Place 4: 830,331 votes, or 24.5%. In the May 2019 local Texas elections, Tony Valdivia achieved 29.5% in the race for the San Antonio District 8 council seat. This result marked the first time that a Libertarian Party member exceeded 10% in a major Texas city council election.

== Officeholders ==
- Ed Tidwell – Mayor of Lago Vista
- Larry Bush – Jarrell City Council

== Campaigns and elections ==
=== 2008 campaigns ===
In the 2008 elections, 174 candidates filed for nomination by the party. During the election cycle, the party announced that Suzanna Hupp, a former Texas state representative, had asked two Libertarians running for Republican-held house districts to drop out of the race to prevent election spoiling.

=== 2010 campaigns ===
In the 2010 elections, 193 candidates filed for nomination by the party, including five gubernatorial candidates.

=== 2012 election results ===
In the 2012 elections, five of the party's statewide candidates received over 1 million votes, approximately 17-22% of votes in those races. All five were running in races where the Texas Democratic Party did not nominate a candidate, namely a special election to the Railroad Commission of Texas, two seats on the Supreme Court of Texas, and two seats on the Texas Court of Criminal Appeals.

Ed Tidwell, a gubernatorial candidate for the party in 2010, won a seat on the city council of Austin suburb Lago Vista with 53% of the vote.

=== 2016 election results ===
In the 2016 elections, the party ran candidates for twenty-four U.S. House districts, Railroad Commissioner, six judges on the Supreme Court of Texas and Texas Court of Criminal Appeals, three Texas State Board of Education districts, six Texas Senate districts, and twenty-eight Texas House of Representatives districts.

The party's candidate for the Railroad Commission, Mark Miller, was endorsed by several major state newspapers, including The Dallas Morning News and the Houston Chronicle. Miller finished in third place with 5.28% of the vote, passing the 5% threshold necessary for the party to maintain its ballot access.

=== 2021 Libertarian National Committee chair special election ===
In 2021, LP of Texas chair Whitney Bilyeu was elected as the 21st National chair of the Libertarian National Committee (LNC) in a special election.
