= 2014 Texas elections =

- November 4, 2014

Elections were held in Texas on November 4, 2014. All of Texas's executive officers were up for election as well as a United States Senate seat, and all of Texas's thirty-six seats in the United States House of Representatives. Primary elections were held on March 4, 2014. Primary runoffs, required if no candidate wins a majority of the vote, were held on May 27, 2014. Elections were also held for the Texas legislature and proposition 1, seeking funds for Texas highways (which passed).

A combination of retirements, incumbents seeking other offices and a primary defeat means that after the election, for the first time since 1874, all of Texas's executive offices were held by new officeholders.

The Tea Party made large gains in the 2014 elections, with Tea Party-backed candidates being elected into offices such as lieutenant governor and attorney general, among other offices.

== Governor ==
Incumbent Republican Governor Rick Perry, who has served in the office since December 21, 2000, when George W. Bush resigned ahead of being sworn in as President of the United States, has announced that he will not run for a fourth full term as governor. This will be the first open election for governor since 1990, when Ann Richards was elected.

Greg Abbott won the Republican primary, Wendy Davis won the Democratic primary. Kathie Glass won the Libertarian Party of Texas nomination in convention. They and a Green candidate will contest the general election.

Abbott won the general election, defeating Davis by twenty points.

== Lieutenant governor ==
Incumbent Lieutenant Governor David Dewhurst ran for an unprecedented fourth term, but was defeated in the Republican primary by his more conservative opponent, state senator Dan Patrick. Patrick would go on to win the general election in a landslide over Leticia Van de Putte. Patrick was sworn in on January 20, 2015.

== Attorney General ==
Incumbent Republican Attorney General Greg Abbott was eligible to seek re-election to a fourth term, but instead decided to run for governor. Republican state senator Ken Paxton defeated Democratic attorney Sam Houston with 58.81% of the vote.

== Comptroller of Public Accounts ==
Incumbent Republican Comptroller Susan Combs retired and did not seek a third term in office.

=== Republican primary ===
==== Candidates ====
Declared

- Glenn Hegar, state senator
- Harvey Hilderbran, state representative
- Debra Medina, activist and candidate for governor in 2010
- Raul Torres, former state representative

Declined

- Susan Combs, Comptroller of Public Accounts

==== Polling ====
Poll source	Date(s) administered	Sample size	Margin of error	Glenn Hegar	Harvey Hilderbran	Debra Medina	Raul Torres	Other	Undecided
UoT/Texas Tribune	February 7–17, 2014	461	±4.56%	24%	26%	39%	11%	—	—
UoT/Texas Tribune	October 18–27, 2013	519	±5.02%	4%	2%	14%	5%	—	75%

==== Results ====
Republican primary results
Party	Candidate	Votes	%
Republican	Glenn Hegar	612,269	49.99
Republican	Harvey Hilderbran	318,899	26.04
Republican	Debra Medina	236,531	19.31
Republican	Raul Torres	56,937	4.64
Total votes		1,224,636	100

A runoff was to be held, but with Hegar only narrowly below the 50% threshold and with several thousand provisional and overseas ballots to be counted, Hildebran withdrew on March 7, 2014, and endorsed Hegar. When the final results were released, Hegar had come only 50 votes short of winning the primary outright.

=== Democratic primary ===
==== Candidates ====
Declared

- Mike Collier, businessman and accountant

=== Libertarian nomination ===
==== Candidates ====
Declared

- Ben Sanders

=== Green nomination ===
==== Candidates ====
Declared

- Deb Shafto, nominee for Governor in 2010

=== General election ===
==== Polling ====
Poll source	Date(s) administered	Sample size	Margin of error	Glenn Hegar (R)	Mike Collier (D)	Other	Undecided
UoT/Texas Tribune	October 10–19, 2014	866	± 3.6%	49%	34%	17%	—
UoT/Texas Tribune	May 30–June 8, 2014	1,200	± 2.83%	32%	25%	7%	37%

==== Results ====
Texas Comptroller of Public Accounts election, 2014
Party	Candidate	Votes	%
Republican	Glenn Hegar	2,692,803	58.36
Democratic	Mike Collier	1,739,308	37.69
Libertarian	Ben Sanders	136,969	2.96
Green	Deb Shafto	44,924	0.97
Majority		953,495	20.67%
Total votes		4,614,004	100
Turnout			32.89
Republican hold			

== Commissioner of the General Land Office ==
2014 Texas Land Commissioner election
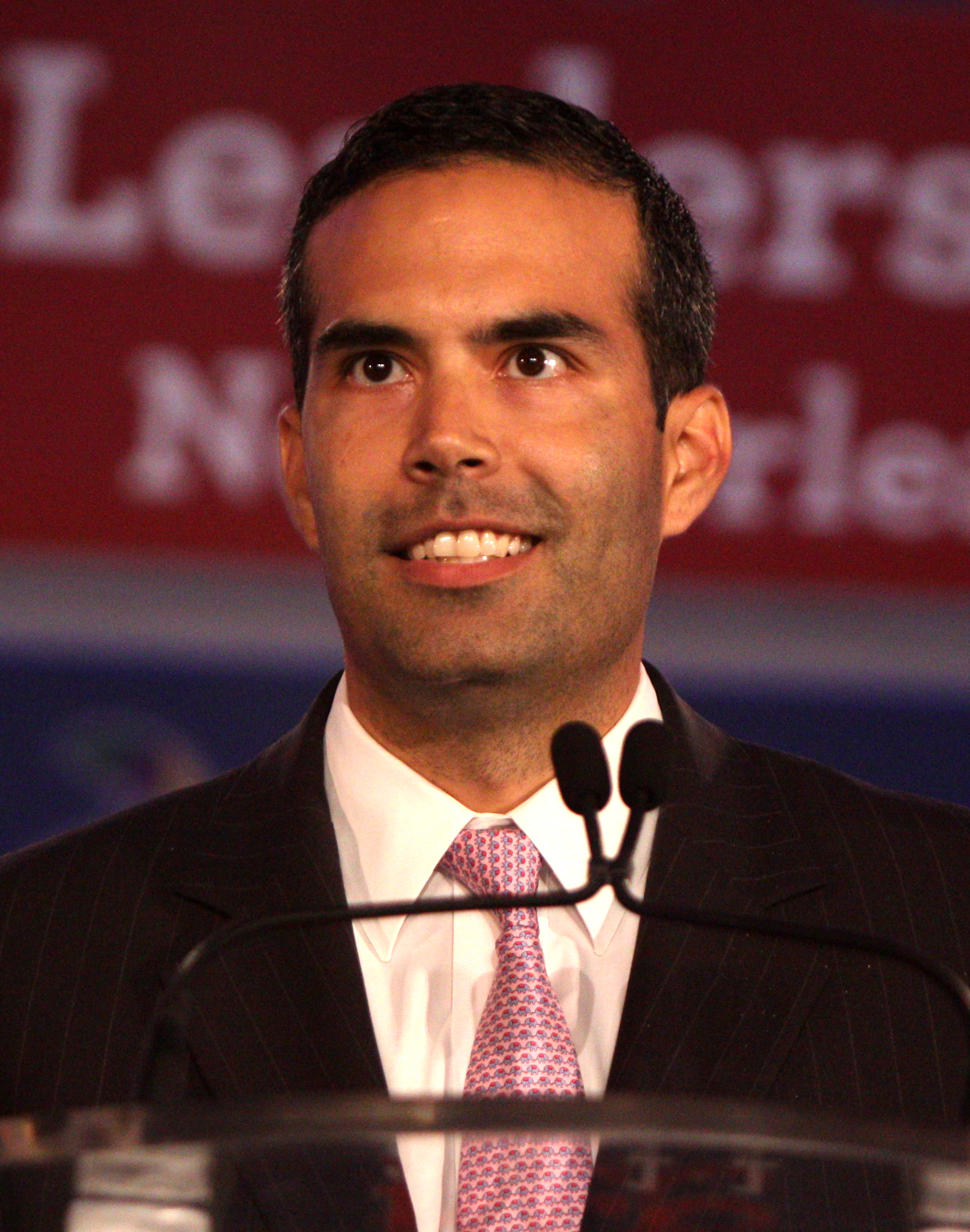

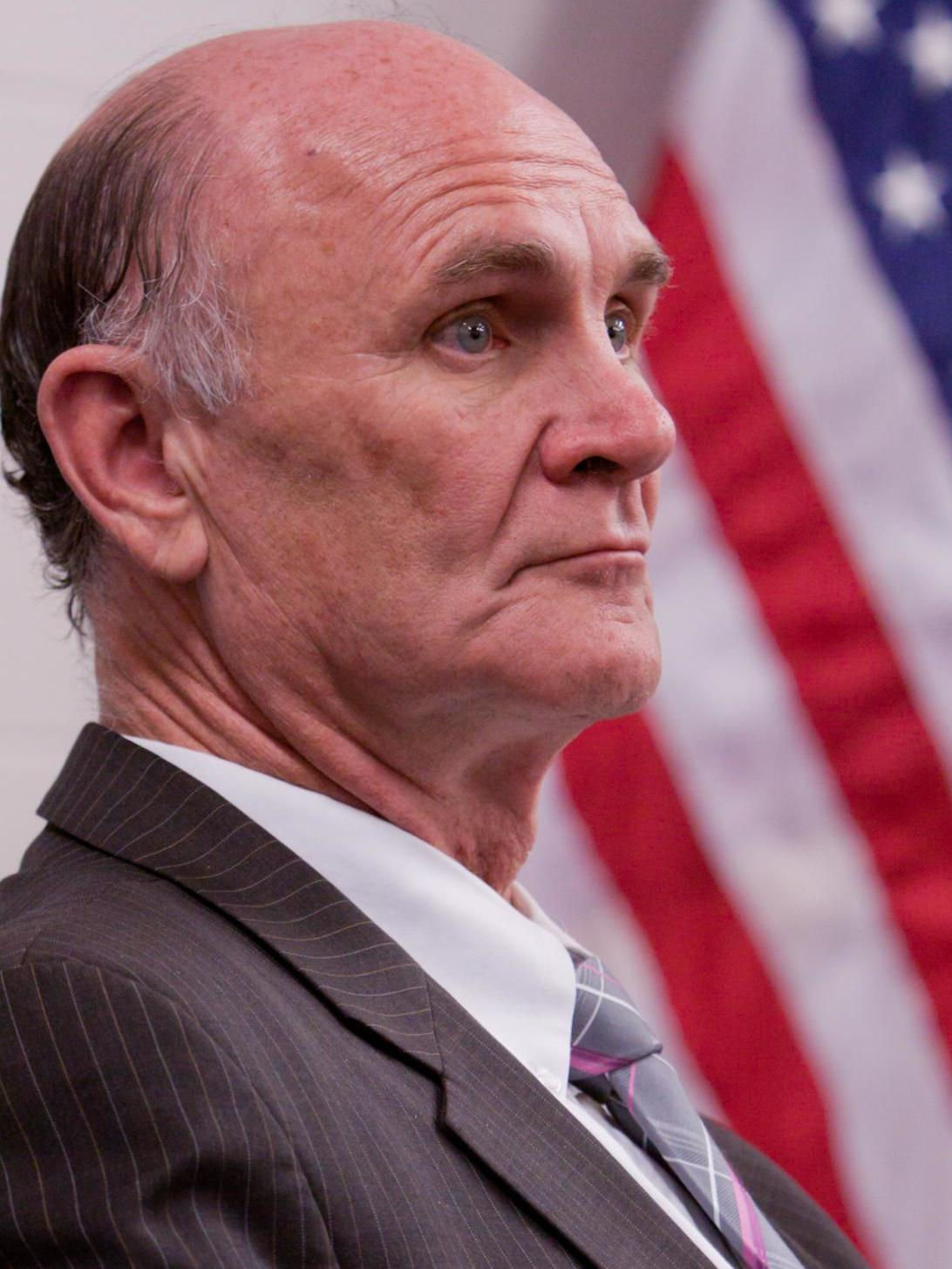
Nominee	George P. Bush	John Cook
Party	Republican	Democratic
Popular vote	2,821,359	1,641,858
Percentage	60.6%	35.3%
- County results Bush: 40–50% 50–60% 60–70% 70–80% 80–90% >90% Cook: 40–50% 50–60% 60–70% 70–80% 80–90%
Land Commissioner before election
Jerry E. Patterson
Republican
Elected Land Commissioner
George P. Bush
Republican

Incumbent Republican Commissioner Jerry E. Patterson did not run for re-election to a fourth term. He instead ran unsuccessfully for lieutenant governor.

=== Republican primary ===
==== Candidates ====
Declared

- George P. Bush, attorney, U.S. Navy Reserve officer and son of former Governor of Florida Jeb Bush
- David Watts, businessman, author, preacher and flight instructor

Declined

- Jerry E. Patterson, Commissioner of the General Land Office

==== Results ====
Republican primary results
Party	Candidate	Votes	%
Republican	George P. Bush	937,987	72.99
Republican	David Watts	346,949	27.00
Total votes		1,284,936	100

=== Democratic primary ===
==== Candidates ====
Declared

- John Cook, former mayor of El Paso

=== Libertarian nomination ===
==== Candidates ====
Declared

- Steven Childs
- Justin Knight

Withdrew

- Ed Tidwell, Lago Vista City Councilman

Knight won the Libertarian nomination

=== Green nomination ===
==== Candidates ====
Declared

- Ulises Cabrera

=== General election ===
==== Polling ====
Poll source	Date(s) administered	Sample size	Margin of error	George P. Bush (R)	John Cook (D)	Other	Undecided
UoT/Texas Tribune	October 10–19, 2014	866	± 3.6%	50%	32%	17%	—
UoT/Texas Tribune	May 30–June 8, 2014	1,200	± 2.83%	36%	25%	9%	30%
Public Policy Polling	April 10–13, 2014	559	± 4.1%	50%	32%	—	18%

==== Results ====
Texas Commissioner of the General Land Office election, 2014
Party	Candidate	Votes	%
Republican	George P. Bush	2,821,359	60.68
Democratic	John Cook	1,641,858	35.31
Libertarian	Justin Knight	126,203	2.71
Green	Valerie Alessi	59,992	1.29
Majority		1,179,501	25.37%
Total votes		4,649,412	100
Turnout			33.14
Republican hold			

== Commissioner of Agriculture ==
2014 Texas Agriculture Commissioner election
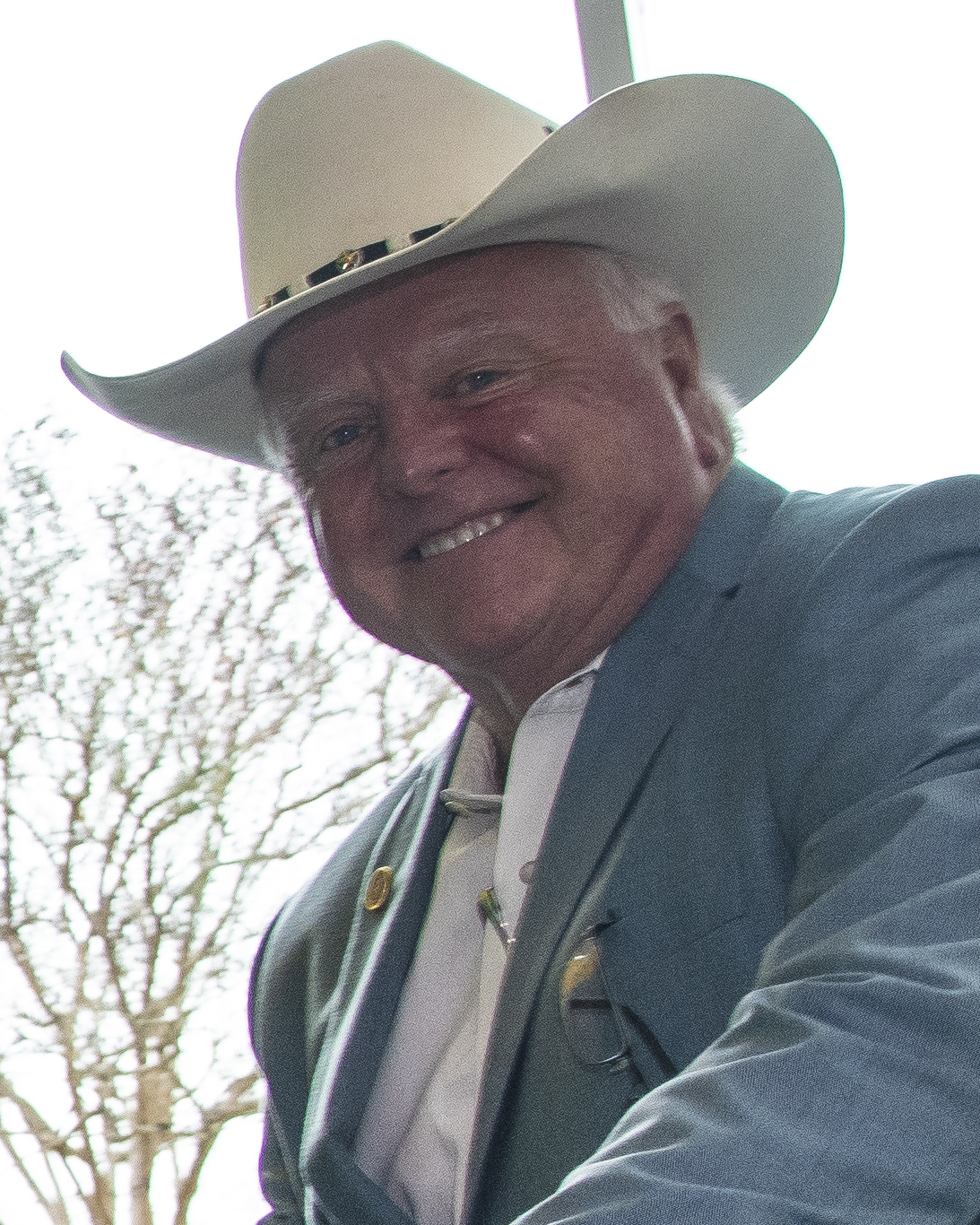

Nominee	Sid Miller	Jim Hogan
Party	Republican	Democratic
Popular vote	2,693,466	1,694,059
Percentage	58.5%	36.8%
- County results Miller: 40–50% 50–60% 60–70% 70–80% 80–90% >90% Hogan: 40–50% 50–60% 60–70% 70–80% 80–90%
Agriculture Commissioner before election
Todd Staples
Republican
Elected Agriculture Commissioner
Sid Miller
Republican

Incumbent Republican Commissioner Todd Staples did not run for re-election to a third term. He instead ran unsuccessfully for lieutenant governor. On September 18, he announced that he would resign within the next two months, to become President of the Texas Oil and Gas Association.

=== Republican primary ===
==== Candidates ====
Declared

- J. Allen Carnes, Mayor of Uvalde
- Joe Cotten, candidate for Railroad Commission of Texas in 2012
- Tommy Merritt, former state representative
- Sid Miller, former state representative
- Eric Opiela, attorney, rancher and former executive director of the Republican Party of Texas

Withdrew

- Brandon Creighton, state representative (running for the state senate)

Declined

- Todd Staples, Commissioner of Agriculture

==== Results ====
Republican primary results
Party	Candidate	Votes	%
Republican	Sid Miller	411,560	34.56
Republican	Tommy Merritt	249,440	20.94
Republican	Eric Opiela	207,222	17.40
Republican	Joe Cotten	174,348	14.64
Republican	J. Allen Carnes	148,222	12.44
Total votes		1,190,792	100

==== Runoff ====
Results

Republican primary runoff results
Party	Candidate	Votes	%
Republican	Sid Miller	362,573	53.08
Republican	Tommy Merritt	320,434	46.92
Total votes		683,007	100

=== Democratic primary ===
==== Candidates ====
Declared

- Hugh Fitzsimons, rancher and former member of the Winter Garden Water Conservation District
- Kinky Friedman, singer, songwriter, novelist, humorist and Independent candidate for Governor in 2006
- Jim Hogan, farmer and insurance agent

==== Results ====
Democratic primary results
Party	Candidate	Votes	%
Democratic	Jim Hogan	190,090	38.74
Democratic	Kinky Friedman	185,180	37.74
Democratic	Hugh Fitzsimons	115,395	23.51
Total votes		490,665	100

==== Runoff ====
Results

Democratic primary runoff results
Party	Candidate	Votes	%
Democratic	Jim Hogan	105,763	53.71
Democratic	Kinky Friedman	91,154	46.29
Total votes		196,917	100

=== Libertarian nomination ===
==== Candidates ====
Declared

- Rick Donaldson
- David "Rocky" Palmquist, rancher

Palmquist won the Libertarian nomination.

=== Green nomination ===
==== Candidates ====
Declared

- Kenneth Kendrick, food safety advocate and whistleblower

=== General election ===
==== Polling ====
Poll source	Date(s) administered	Sample size	Margin of error	Sid Miller (R)	Jim Hogan (D)	Other	Undecided
UoT/Texas Tribune	October 10–19, 2014	866	± 3.6%	47%	35%	18%	—
UoT/Texas Tribune	May 30–June 8, 2014	1,200	± 2.83%	32%	24%	9%	34%

==== Results ====
Texas Commissioner of Agriculture election, 2014
Party	Candidate	Votes	%
Republican	Sid Miller	2,693,466	58.58
Democratic	Jim Hogan	1,694,059	36.84
Libertarian	David "Rocky" Palmquist	132,299	2.87
Green	Kenneth Kendrick	77,416	1.68
Majority		999,407	21.74%
Total votes		4,597,240	100
Turnout			32.77
Republican hold			

== Railroad Commissioner ==
2014 Texas Railroad Commissioner election
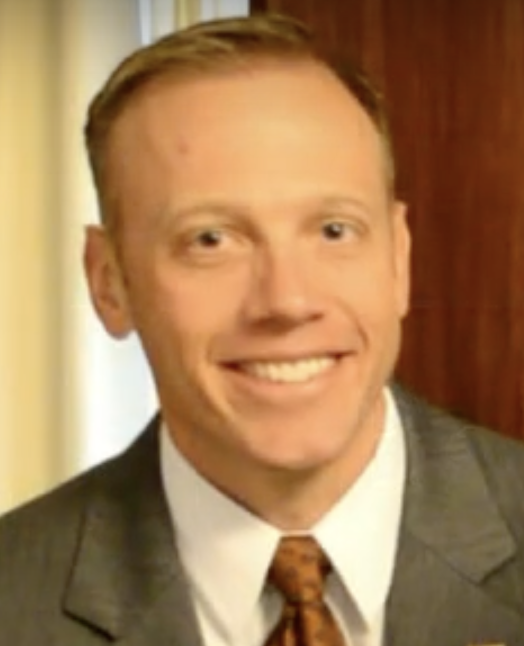

Nominee	Ryan Sitton	Steve Brown
Party	Republican	Democratic
Popular vote	2,679,537	1,679,658
Percentage	58.2%	36.5%
- County results Christian: 40–50% 50–60% 60–70% 70–80% 80–90% >90% Brown: 40–50% 50–60% 60–70% 70–80% Tie: 40–50%
Railroad Commissioner before election
Barry Smitherman
Republican
Elected Railroad Commissioner
Ryan Sitton
Republican

Incumbent Republican Commissioner Barry Smitherman did not run for re-election to a full term. He instead ran unsuccessfully for attorney general.

=== Republican primary ===
==== Candidates ====
Declared

- Becky Berger, geologist and candidate for the Railroad Commission in 2012
- Malachi Boyuls, attorney and venture capitalist
- Wayne Christian, former state representative
- Ryan Sitton, oil and gas engineer and candidate for the Texas House of Representatives in 2012

Withdrew

- Stefani Carter, state representative (running for re-election)
- Ray Keller, former state representative
- Joe Pool Jr., candidate for Texas Supreme Court Justice Place 4 in 2012 and son of former U.S. Representative Joe R. Pool

Declined

- Barry Smitherman, Chairman of the Railroad Commission of Texas

==== Results ====
Republican primary results
Party	Candidate	Votes	%
Republican	Wayne Christian	503,634	42.68
Republican	Ryan Sitton	360,125	30.52
Republican	Becky Berger	198,672	16.83
Republican	Malachi Boyuls	117,511	9.95
Total votes		1,179,942	100

==== Runoff ====
Results

Republican primary runoff results
Party	Candidate	Votes	%
Republican	Ryan Sitton	398,652	57.25
Republican	Wayne Christian	297,654	42.75
Total votes		696,306	100

=== Democratic primary ===
==== Candidates ====
Declared

- Steve Brown, former chairman of the Fort Bend County Democratic Party
- Dale Henry, perennial candidate

==== Results ====
Democratic primary results
Party	Candidate	Votes	%
Democratic	Steve Brown	299,009	64.02
Democratic	Dale Henry	168,036	35.97
Total votes		467,045	100

=== Libertarian nomination ===
==== Candidates ====
Declared

- Jason Kute
- Mark Miller, businessman

Miller won the Libertarian nomination.

=== Green nomination ===
==== Candidates ====
Declared

- Martina Salinas

=== General election ===
==== Polling ====
Poll source	Date(s) administered	Sample size	Margin of error	Ryan Sitton (R)	Steve Brown (D)	Other	Undecided
UoT/Texas Tribune	October 10–19, 2014	866	± 3.6%	48%	34%	19%	—
UoT/Texas Tribune	May 30–June 8, 2014	1,200	± 2.83%	32%	24%	10%	33%

==== Results ====
Texas Railroad Commissioner election, 2014
Party	Candidate	Votes	%
Republican	Ryan Sitton	2,679,537	58.27
Democratic	Steve Brown	1,679,658	36.52
Libertarian	Mark Miller	145,127	3.15
Green	Kenneth Kendrick	93,988	2.04
Majority		999,879	21.74%
Total votes		4,598,310	100
Turnout			32.78
Republican hold			

== Texas Legislature ==
Every seat in the Texas House of Representatives and about half of the seats in the Texas Senate were up for election.

=== Texas House of Representatives ===
Affiliation	Party (Shading indicates majority caucus)		Total	
Affiliation	Republican	Democratic	Total	Vacant
Before 2014 elections	95	55	150	0
Voting share	63%	37%		
After 2014 elections	98	52	150	0
Voting share	65%	35%		

=== Texas Senate ===
Affiliation	Party (Shading indicates majority caucus)		Total	
Affiliation	Republican	Democratic	Total	Vacant
Before 2014 elections	19	12	31	0
Voting share	61%	39%		
After 2014 elections	20	11	31	0
Voting share	65%	35%		

== United States Senate ==
Incumbent Republican senator and Senate Minority Whip John Cornyn ran for re-election to a third term. He won the Republican primary with 59% of the vote, easily turning back a primary challenge from U.S. Representative Steve Stockman and six others. The Democratic primary went to a runoff after businessman David Alameel took 47% of the vote and Worldwide LaRouche Youth Movement activist Kesha Rogers took 22% of the vote. Alameel won the runoff.

In the general election, Cornyn defeated Alameel 61.6%–34.4%.

== United States House of Representatives ==
All of Texas's thirty-six seats in the United States House of Representatives were up for election in 2014.
