= 2026 Texas Railroad Commissioner election =

- November 3, 2026

Nominee	Jon Rosenthal	Bo French
Party	Democratic	Republican
Popular vote	5,105,065	4,427,530
Percentage	52.5%	45.5%
- Rosenthal: 40–50% 50–60% 60–70% 70–80% French: 40–50% 50–60% 60–70% 70–80% 80–90% >90%
Railroad Commissioner before election
Jim Wright
Republican
Elected Railroad Commissioner
Jon Rosenthal
Democratic

The 2026 Texas Railroad Commissioner election was held on November 3, 2026, to elect a member of the Texas Railroad Commission. Incumbent Republican commissioner Jim Wright ran for re-election to a second six-year term but was defeated by Bo French in the Republican primary. He was first elected in 2020 with 53% of the vote.

Democratic state representative Jon Rosenthal won the general election, becoming the first Democrat elected to the office since Bob Krueger in 1990.

== Republican primary ==
=== Candidates ===
==== Nominee ====
- Bo French, former chair of the Tarrant County Republican Party

==== Eliminated in runoff ====
- Jim Wright, incumbent Railroad Commissioner

==== Eliminated in primary ====
- Katherine Culbert, process safety engineer and Democratic nominee for Railroad Commissioner in 2024
- Hawk Dunlap, oilman and Libertarian nominee for Railroad Commissioner in 2024
- Jim Matlock, oilman

=== Endorsements ===
Katherine Culbert

Newspapers

- The Dallas Morning News
Hawk Dunlap

Newspapers

- Austin American-Statesman
- Houston Chronicle
- San Antonio Express-News
Bo French

U.S. representatives

- Keith Self, TX-03 (2023–present)

State legislators

- Andy Hopper, HD-64 (2025–present)
- Matt Krause, Tarrant County commissioner (2025–present) and former HD-93 (2013–2023)
- Mitch Little, HD-65 (2025–present)
- David Lowe, HD-91 (2025–present)
- Brent Money, HD-2 (2025–present)
- Nate Schatzline, HD-93 (2023–present)
- Steve Toth, HD-15 (2013–2015, 2019–present) and Republican nominee for TX-2 in 2026
- Wesley Virdell, HD-53 (2025–present)

Local officials

- Tim O'Hare, judge of Tarrant County (2023–present)

Individuals

- Brandon Herrera, YouTuber and Republican nominee for TX-23 in 2026

Organizations

- Texans for Fiscal Responsibility
- Turning Point Action
Jim Wright

Statewide officials

- Greg Abbott, governor of Texas (2015–present)
- Dawn Buckingham, land commissioner of Texas (2023–present)
- Wayne Christian, railroad commissioner of Texas (2017–present)
- Christi Craddick, railroad commissioner of Texas (2012–present)
- Dan Patrick, Lieutenant Governor of Texas (2015–present)

State legislators

- Rep. Drew Darby, HD-72 (2007–present)
- Rep. Jeff Leach, HD-67 (2013–present)
- Rep. Jared Patterson, HD-106 (2019–present)
- Sen. Charles Perry, Senate pro tempore (2025–present) from SD-28 (2014–present)

Local officials

- Mattie Parker, mayor of Fort Worth (2021–present)

Organizations

- Texas Alliance for Life

=== First round ===
==== Campaign ====
In November 2025, Bo French, then chair of the Tarrant County Republican Party, announced he would be resigning from his position to challenge the incumbent Railroad Commissioner Jim Wright. French stated his motivations for running for the office were "to put American citizens, American interests, and American energy first" and that it would be the "best way that I can defend Texas, stop the Islamic invasion and defeat the left." Even though the Railroad Commission is focused on oil and gas regulation, French spent most of his time on the campaign trail focused on culture war issues. While speaking at the Conservative Political Action Conference (CPAC) in Grapevine, Texas, French embraced anti-Muslim rhetoric, claiming that Muslims were infiltrating and conquering the state saying "You know what, maybe I am Islamophobic. I am afraid of what they’re going to be doing to our great country"; during the panel he also called for the deportation of 100 million people, including all Muslims.

French referred to Wright as "Jihadi Jim", accusing him of allowing sharia law in Texas and permitting China to take control of Texas oil fields. Wright criticized French's priorities as irrelevant, saying that the Texas Railroad Commission "has nothing to do" with Islam, DEI, or the Chinese Communist Party.

==== Results ====
Results by county Wright: 20–30%; 30–40%; 40–50%; 50–60%; French: 20–30%; 30–40%; 40–50%; Matlock: 20–30%; 30–40%; 40–50%; Dunlap: 30–40%; 40–50%

Republican primary
Party	Candidate	Votes	%
Republican	Jim Wright (incumbent)	620,959	32.1
Republican	Bo French	614,178	31.7
Republican	James Matlock	373,047	19.3
Republican	Katherine Culbert	178,175	9.2
Republican	Hawk Dunlap	148,303	7.7
Total votes		1,934,672	100.0

=== Runoff ===
==== Campaign ====
In the March 2026 Republican primary, Wright led the race with 32.1% of the vote closely followed by French who received 31.7%, since neither candidate won a majority, the vote proceeded to a runoff. The downballot race was notable for the large number of campaign funds being raised, including donations by billionaires Tim Dunn and Farris Wilks, well known hardline conservative donors, who supported French through their political action committee. Governor Greg Abbott endorsed Wright saying "[French] doesn't know anything about oil and gas."

In the May runoff, French narrowly upset Wright with just over 50% of the vote securing the nomination. After the results of the runoff were announced Abbott and other supporters of Wright quickly endorsed French despite their past criticisms.

==== Polling ====
Poll source	Date(s) administered	Sample size	Margin of error	Jim Wright	Bo French	Other	Undecided
University of Houston	April 28 – May 1, 2026	1,200 (LV)	± 2.83%	35%	28%	–	37%

==== Results ====
Results by county French: 50–60%; 60–70%; Wright: 50–60%; 60–70%; 70–80%; 80–90%; Tie

Republican primary runoff
Party	Candidate	Votes	%
Republican	Bo French	665,409	50.5
Republican	Jim Wright (incumbent)	651,061	49.5
Total votes		1,316,470	100.0

== Democratic primary ==
=== Candidates ===
==== Nominee ====
- Jon Rosenthal, state representative from the 135th district (2019–present)

=== Endorsements ===
Jon Rosenthal

Labor unions

- Texas American Federation of Teachers

=== Results ===
Democratic primary
Party	Candidate	Votes	%
Democratic	Jon Rosenthal	1,907,233	100.0
Total votes		1,907,233	100.0

== Libertarian convention ==
=== Candidates ===
==== Nominee ====
- Arthur DiBianca, retired programmer and co-founder of the Libertarian Booster PAC

== General election ==
=== Campaign ===
On September 13, 2026, French made a series of posts on X about a photo of students of Indian descent cheering on the Texas Longhorns at a college football game. French said the picture showed a "problem" and "expos[ed] how many Americans have been displaced by foreigners." The post received widespread backlash condemning French's commentary as racist. This included several high-profile Republicans like Senator John Cornyn and strategist Karl Rove, with Rove calling French a "bigot" and saying he would support Rosenthal. Cornyn also said he would not vote for French, but stopped short of endorsing Rosenthal. In response to the criticism, French stood by his comments stating "It's no surprise that the less-conservative people in Texas are the ones attacking me."

Meanwhile, his rival, Democratic candidate Jon Rosenthal emphasized his experience working as an oil and gas engineer for 25 years, and promised lower utility rates and increased environmental regulations.

=== Post-primary endorsements ===
Bo French (R)

Statewide officials

- Greg Abbott, governor of Texas (2015–present)
- Dawn Buckingham, land commissioner of Texas (2023–present)
- Wayne Christian, railroad commissioner of Texas (2017–present)
- Christi Craddick, railroad commissioner of Texas (2012–present)
- Dan Patrick, lieutenant governor of Texas (2015–present)

Organizations

- Texas Alliance of Energy Producers
- Texas Oil and Gas Association
Jon Rosenthal (D)

Executive branch officials

- Karl Rove, former White House deputy chief of staff for policy (2005–2007) (Republican)

Local officials

- Mattie Parker, Mayor of Fort Worth, Texas (2021–present) (Republican)

Individuals

- Hawk Dunlap, 2024 Libertarian Party Railroad Commissioner Nominee, 2026 Republican Party Railroad Commissioner Candidate

Labor unions

- AFL-CIO Texas

Organizations

- 314 Action
- Center for Freethought Equality
- Sierra Club Texas

Newspapers

- Austin American-Statesman
- The Dallas Morning News
- Houston Chronicle
- San Antonio Express-News
Declined to endorse

U.S. senators

- John Cornyn, Texas (2002–present)

=== Fundraising ===
The increased national profile the race gained following French's controversial social media posts dramatically increased both candidates' fundraising, with each seeking to capitalize on the publicity. During the third quarter, Rosenthal outraised French for the first time, although neither candidate has received donations from the state's oil and gas industry, which the Railroad Commission regulates.

Campaign finance reports as of October 24, 2026
Candidate	Raised	Spent	Cash on hand
Bo French (R)	$3,632,295	$2,596,082	$434,535
Jon Rosenthal (D)	$1,248,269	$663,209	$561,552
Arthur DiBianca (L)	$4,834	$0	$0
Source: Texas Ethics Commission

=== Debates ===
2026 Texas Railroad Commissioner debate
No.	Date	Host	Moderator	Link	Republican	Democratic
Key: P Participant A Absent N Not invited I Invited W Withdrawn						
Key: P Participant A Absent N Not invited I Invited W Withdrawn					Bo French	Jon Rosenthal
1	October 22, 2026	Dallas Press Club			Canceled	

=== Polling ===
Poll source	Date(s) administered	Sample size (Note: Key: A – all adults RV – registered voters LV – likely voters V – unclear)	Margin of error	Bo French (R)	Jon Rosenthal (D)	Other	Undecided
Texas Southern University	October 21–25, 2026	2,000 (LV)	± 2.2%	47%	46%	3% (Note: Arthur DiBianca (L) with 3%)	4%
Texas Public Opinion Research	October 15–18, 2026	969 (LV)	± 3.9%	50%	48%	2% (Note: Arthur DiBianca (L) with 2%)	–
ActiVote	September 25 – October 17, 2026	400 (LV)	± 4.9%	52%	48%	—	—
University of Houston	October 10–14, 2026	2,000 (LV)	± 2.2%	45%	43%	2% (Note: Arthur DiBianca (L) with 2%)	10%
University of Texas/Texas Politics Project	September 25 – October 5, 2026	861 (LV)	± 3.3%	46%	47%	7% (Note: Arthur DiBianca (L) with 3%; "Someone else" with 4%)	—
Stratus Intelligence	September 22–24, 2026	856 (LV)	± 3.5%	46%	44%	–	10%
Texas Public Opinion Research	September 19–22, 2026	1,007 (LV)	± 3.6%	45%	44%	4% (Note: Arthur DiBianca 2%, "Would not vote in that race" 2%)	7%
Texas Southern University	September 15–19, 2026	1,800 (LV)	± 2.3%	44%	42%	3% (Note: Arthur DiBianca (L) with 3%)	11%
Texas Public Opinion Research	August 21–24, 2026	1,000 (LV)	± 3.3%	45% (Note: With voters who lean towards a given candidate)	41%	5% (Note: "Would not vote in that race" with 4%; Arthur DiBianca (L) with 1%)	9%
Texas Southern University	July 27–30, 2026	1,200 (LV)	± 2.8%	44%	41%	2% (Note: Art DiBianca (L) with 2%)	13%

=== Results ===
2026 Texas Railroad Commissioner election
Party	Candidate	Votes	%	±%
Democratic	Jon Rosenthal	5,105,065	52.5	
Republican	Bo French	4,427,530	45.5	
Libertarian	Arthur DiBianca	188,055	1.9	
Total votes		9,720,650	100.0%	
Democratic gain from Republican				

== See also ==
- 2026 Texas elections
