= Christi Craddick =

American politician (born 1970)

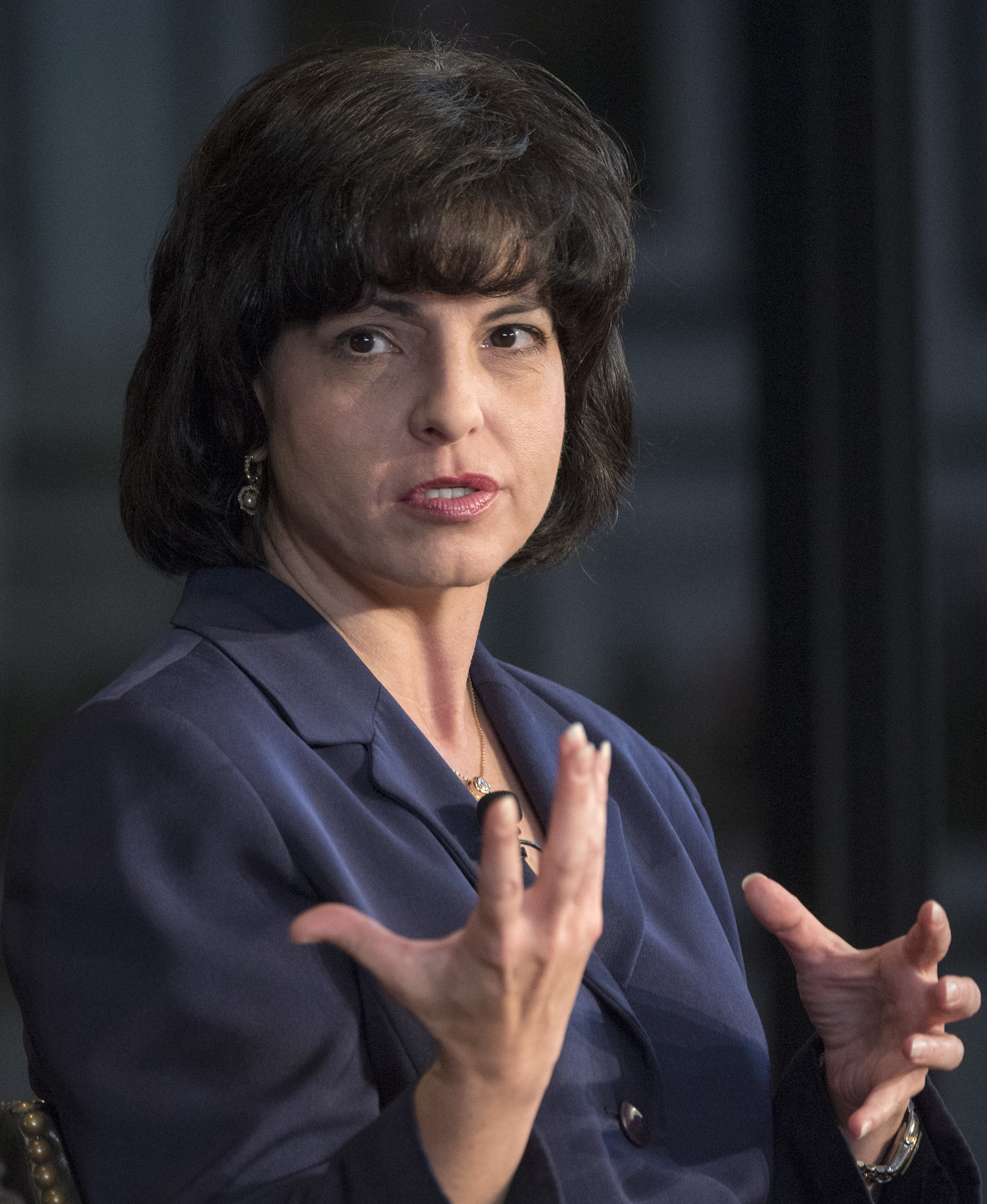
- Craddick in 2016

Railroad Commissioner of Texas
- Incumbent
- Assumed office December 12, 2012
- Governor: Rick Perry; Greg Abbott
- Preceded by: Buddy Garcia

Personal details
- Born: Christi Leigh Craddick; July 1, 1970 (age 56) Midland, Texas, U.S.
- Party: Republican
- Children: 1
- Parent: Tom Craddick (father)
- Education: University of Texas, Austin (BA, JD)
- Website: Office website Campaign website

Christi Leigh Craddick (born July 1, 1970) is an American politician who has served as a member of the Railroad Commission of Texas since 2012.

A native of Midland, Texas, Craddick is the daughter of Tom Craddick, a former speaker of the Texas House of Representatives. After winning re-election for a third term in 2024, Craddick announced in March 2025 her decision to run for Texas Comptroller in the 2026 election. Craddick was ultimately unsuccessful, being defeated in the primary election by Don Huffines.

== Background ==
Craddick's father is State Representative Tom Craddick, a Midland businessman who was the Speaker of the Texas House of Representatives from 2003 to 2009. Craddick has one daughter. She is Roman Catholic.

Craddick graduated from Midland High School, obtained her undergraduate degree from the University of Texas at Austin, and received her Juris Doctor from the University of Texas School of Law.

Christi Craddick and her father have ownership interests in hundreds of oil and gas leases in the state, with a value of over $20 million. Craddick receives royalties of more than $2 million per year for brokering extraction lease sales, which are potential conflicts of interest as she regulates the state's oil industry. Craddick has voted on the Commission on several issues affecting companies in which she has a financial interest. Texas does not have a law against Railroad Commission members deriving money from regulated companies.

== Railroad Commissioner ==
=== 2012 primary ===
Craddick's path to victory surged in the Republican runoff election held on July 31, 2012, when she easily defeated then State Representative Warren Chisum of Pampa in Gray County in the Texas Panhandle. Chisum is a former state legislative lieutenant of Tom Craddick. In that same election, most of the attention had focused not on the Craddick-Chisum race but on conservative Ted Cruz, who defeated Lieutenant Governor David Dewhurst for the Republican nomination to succeed U.S. Senator Kay Bailey Hutchison. Craddick raised triple the campaign contributions of Chisum, more than $1 million compared to $375,000, but Chisum had access to another $600,000 that he had accumulated earlier as a legislator. Craddick enjoyed the support of such wealthy donors as the entrepreneur James R. Leininger of San Antonio and the late homebuilder Bob J. Perry of Houston.

Craddick polled 589,211 votes (60 percent); Chisum, 396,858 ballots (40 percent).

=== 2012 general election ===
Craddick thereafter defeated the Democratic nominee, Dale P. Henry (born 1930), a retired petroleum engineer from Lampasas in Central Texas. Craddick polled 4,336,499 votes (56 percent); Henry, 3,057,733 (40 percent). The remaining 4 percent was cast for two minor-party candidates.

Craddick succeeded Elizabeth Ames Jones of San Antonio, who vacated the seat in February 2012. Jones ran for the District 25 seat in the Texas State Senate, which was ultimately won by the Republican physician Donna Campbell of New Braunfels, who unseated incumbent Senator Jeff Wentworth, a Moderate Republican from San Antonio, in the party runoff on July 31. Interim commissioner Buddy Garcia, an appointee of Governor Rick Perry, stepped down several weeks after the 2012 general election, and Perry named Craddick to complete the few days remaining in Jones's term.

Craddick's two Republican colleagues on the railroad commission were David J. Porter of Giddings in Lee County, formerly of Midland, and the former chairman, Barry Smitherman, formerly of Houston. Smitherman, elected to a two-year unexpired term in 2012, did not seek a full six-year term in 2014; he instead ran for Texas attorney general to succeed Greg Abbott, but came in third place in the Republican primary. Since 1995, when veteran Democratic member James E. Nugent was unseated by Charles R. Matthews, all railroad commissioners have been Republicans. Both Craddick and Porter have ties to the oil-rich Permian Basin of Midland/Odessa.

=== Political analysis ===
Mark Jones, a political scientist at Rice University, attributed Craddick's victory over Chisum to the "respect" within the GOP for her father. Tom Craddick is the longest-serving Republican legislator in Austin, having first been elected in 1968. He lost the Speakership in 2009 to Joe Straus, a moderate Republican from San Antonio, who initially prevailed through a coalition of mostly Democrats and sixteen maverick Republicans.

Former Midland Mayor Ernest Angelo, a one-time Texas Republican National Committeeman, said that Craddick succeeded because she gained credibility with large Republican donors and traveled by highway to meet with the conservative grassroots and women's groups. According to Angelo, Tom Craddick's neighbor of many years, Christi Craddick "showed she will do what it takes to win a state primary. She earned it."

From the start of her term as commissioner, Craddick has been critical of federal intervention into the energy industries: "Texas knows how energy regulation is done. People ought to be modeling themselves after us, instead of ... the EPA," she told an energy policy group in Austin."

In August 2014, she was elected chairman of the Texas Railroad Commission.

=== 2018 reelection ===
On March 16, 2018, Craddick with nearly 76 percent of the vote defeated her Republican primary opponent, Weston Martinez of San Antonio. She then defeated the Democrat Roman McAllen in the November 6 general election. Craddick polled 4,356,658 votes (53.2 percent) to McAllen's 3,588,625 ballots (43.9 percent). Another 236,720 votes (2.9 percent) went to the Libertarian Party nominee, Mike Wright.

== 2026 Comptroller bid ==
In March 2025, it was announced that incumbent Comptroller Glenn Hegar intended to resign in order to become chancellor of the Texas A&M University System. Craddick announced her intention to run for the seat in the 2026 election, along with former State Senator Don Huffines.

Hegar resigned in July, and was succeeded by Kelly Hancock, who announced his intention to run for a full term in the 2026 election, with the support of Hegar and Governor Greg Abbott. Hancock was a State Senator from District 9, but resigned to become chief clerk of the Comptroller's office.

== Electoral history ==
2024 Texas Railroad Commissioner general election
| Party | Candidate | Votes | % |
|---|---|---|---|
| Republican | Christi Craddick (Incumbent) | 6,100,218 | 55.60 |
| Democratic | Katherine Culbert | 4,275,904 | 39.00 |
| Green | Eddie Espinoza | 301,793 | 2.80 |
| Libertarian | Lynn Dunlap | 285,544 | 2.60 |
| Total votes | | 10,963,459 | 100.0 |
| Republican hold | | | |

2018 Texas Railroad Commissioner general election
| Party | Candidate | Votes | % |
|---|---|---|---|
| Republican | Christi Craddick (Incumbent) | 4,376,729 | 53.20 |
| Democratic | Roman McAllen | 3,612,130 | 43.91 |
| Libertarian | Mike Wright | 237,984 | 2.89 |
| Total votes | | 8,226,843 | 100.0 |
| Republican hold | | | |

2018 Texas Railroad Commissioner Primary election
| Party | Candidate | Votes | % |
|---|---|---|---|
| Republican | Christi Craddick (Incumbent) | 1,038,753 | 75.81 |
| Republican | Weston Martinez | 331,317 | 24.18 |
| Total votes | | 1,370,070 | 100.0 |

2012 Texas Railroad Commissioner general election
| Party | Candidate | Votes | % |
|---|---|---|---|
| Republican | Christi Craddick | 4,336,499 | 56.17 |
| Democratic | Katherine Culbert | 3,057,733 | 39.60 |
| Libertarian | Vivekananda (Vik) Wall | 173,001 | 2.24 |
| Green | Chris Kennedy | 153,664 | 1.99 |
| Total votes | | 7,720,897 | 100.0 |
| Republican hold | | | |

2012 Texas Railroad Commissioner Primary runoff election
| Party | Candidate | Votes | % |
|---|---|---|---|
| Republican | Christi Craddick | 592,860 | 59.81 |
| Republican | Warren Chisum | 398,421 | 40.19 |
| Total votes | | 991,281 | 100.0 |

2012 Texas Railroad Commissioner Primary election
| Party | Candidate | Votes | % |
|---|---|---|---|
| Republican | Christi Craddick | 421,610 | 35.87 |
| Republican | Warren Chisum | 320,052 | 27.23 |
| Republican | Becky Berger | 140,752 | 11.98 |
| Republican | Joe Cotten | 123,137 | 10.48 |
| Republican | Roland Sledge | 116,122 | 9.88 |
| Republican | Beryl Burgess | 53,553 | 4.56 |
| Total votes | | 1,175,226 | 100.0 |

Political offices
| Preceded by Buddy Garcia | Member of the Texas Railroad Commission; 2012–present Served alongside: Wayne Christian, Jim Wright | Incumbent |
