= Barry T. Smitherman =

American lawyer

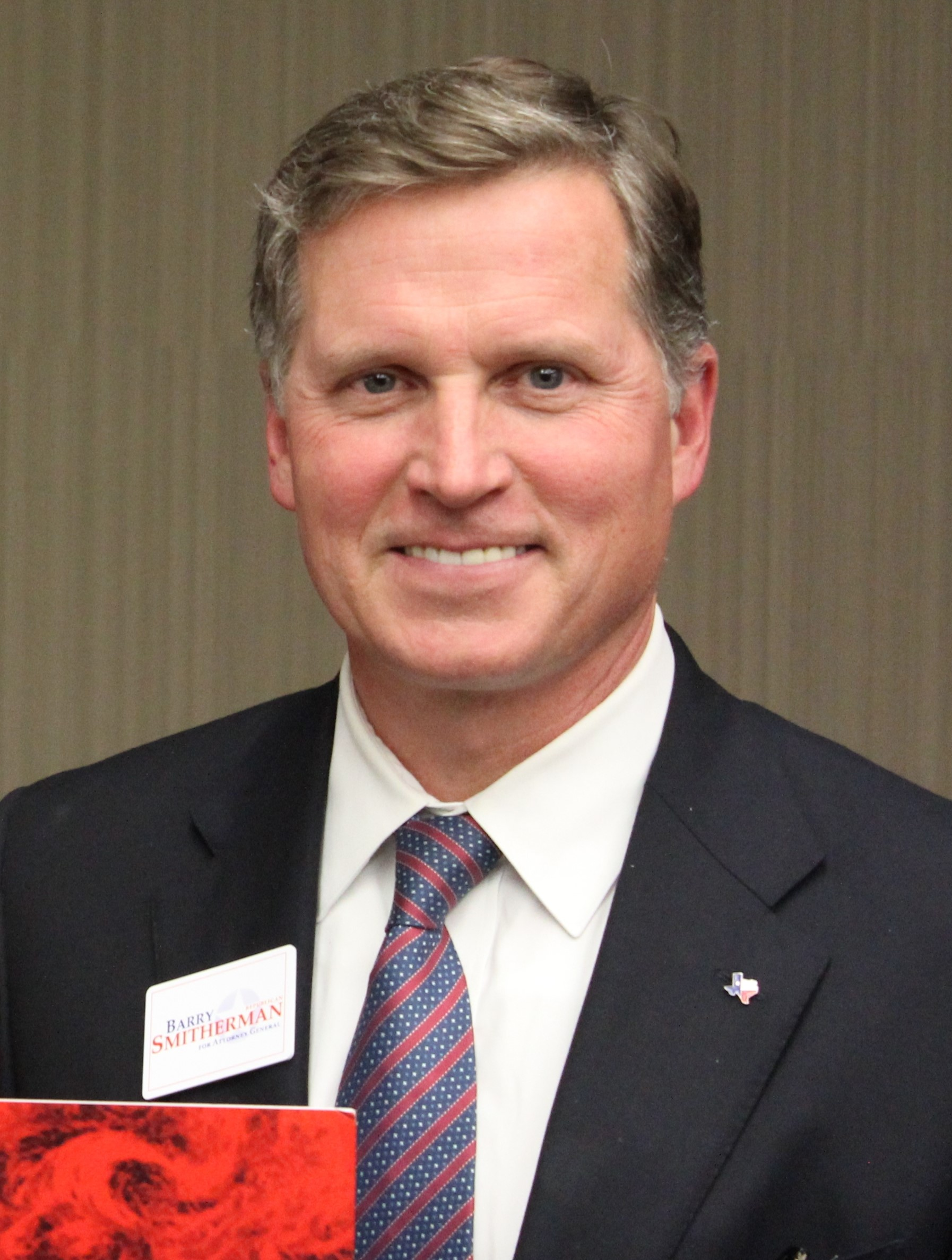
- Smitherman in 2014

Railroad Commissioner of Texas
- In office July 8, 2011 – January 2, 2015
- Governor: Rick Perry
- Preceded by: Michael L. Williams
- Succeeded by: Ryan Sitton

Chairman of the Public Utility Commission of Texas
- In office November 14, 2007 – July 8, 2011
- Preceded by: Paul Hudson
- Succeeded by: Donna L. Nelson

Commissioner of the Public Utility Commission of Texas
- In office April 21, 2004 – July 8, 2011
- Governor: Rick Perry
- Preceded by: Rebecca Klein
- Succeeded by: Rolando Pablos

Personal details
- Born: Barry Thomas Smitherman; September 13, 1957 (age 68) Highlands, Texas, U.S.
- Party: Republican
- Spouse: Marijane Frede Smitherman (m. 1987)
- Children: 4
- Education: Ross S. Sterling High School; Texas A&M University (BBA); University of Texas at Austin (JD); Harvard University (MPA)
- Occupation: Lawyer

Barry Thomas Smitherman (born September 13, 1957) is an American lawyer who served as a member and chairman of the Texas Railroad Commission from 2011 to 2015. A member of the Republican Party, he served as a commissioner of the Public Utility Commission of Texas from 2004 to 2011.

In 2013, Smitherman announced his candidacy to succeed Greg Abbott as state attorney general in the Republican primary election held on March 4, 2014, when Abbott polled 91.5 percent of the ballots cast to win the party's nomination for governor to succeed the retiring Rick Perry, who declined to seek a fourth full term. Smitherman's opponents were State Senator Ken Paxton of McKinney in Collin County and State Representative Dan Branch of Dallas County.

Smitherman finished in third place with 281,064 votes (22.1 percent) in the primary race for attorney general.

== Background ==
Smitherman was reared in Highlands in Harris County on the east side of Houston, Texas. He graduated from Ross S. Sterling High School in Baytown, Texas. He then received a Bachelor of Business Administration summa cum laude from Texas A&M University at College Station. Thereafter, he obtained his Juris Doctor from the University of Texas School of Law in Austin, while he worked at the state capitol for a state senator, Lindon Williams, a Democrat. Smitherman further received a Master of Public Administration degree from the John F. Kennedy School of Government at Harvard University. There he was awarded the first Joel Leff Fellowship in Political Economy.

Smitherman began a career in banking, where he held leadership positions for First Boston, Lazard, and J.P. Morgan Securities, and eventually rose to become the head of Bank One's national municipal finance group before he was fired in April 2002. Bank One's stated reason for the termination was that Smitherman had failed to get company approval before he co-authored an opinion column in the Houston Chronicle with two conservative Houston city council members, in which the authors discussed how the city could improve its credit rating. In January 2003, Smitherman became a prosecutor in the Harris County District Attorney’s office, and in May 2003 Perry named him to the board of the Texas Public Finance Authority.

In April 2004, Governor Perry named Smitherman to the Texas Public Utility Commission (PUC). He became the chairman of that body in November 2007.

In 2004, Smitherman published the book If Jesus Were an Investment Banker (or Any Other Type of Modern Businessman): Leadership Principles from the Messiah and Personal Reflections of an Investment Banker Striving to Be a Christian.

== Railroad Commission ==
After seven years at the PUC, where Smitherman was seen as an advocate of deregulation, he left in July 2011 when Perry appointed him to the Railroad Commission to fill the position vacated by Republican Michael L. Williams, an unsuccessful candidate in 2012 for the United States House of Representatives. Smitherman was elected as chairman of the commission on February 28, 2012 after Elizabeth Ames Jones departed to run for the state senate.

In February 2013, Smitherman apologized for retweeting a list of 16 Republican US senators who voted to allow debate on gun control legislation accompanied by an image of a noose and the word "TREASON." Later that year, Smitherman complained to his daughter's school teacher for using curricular material provided by the Southern Poverty Law Center (SPLC) to study the novel To Kill a Mockingbird. Smitherman characterized what he felt to be the "radical view of racism, hate, and intolerance" held by the SLPC, and he defended a number of organizations such as the Jewish Defense League, the Border Guardians, and Crusaders for Yahweh. Smitherman noted, "Equally disturbing, the SPLC calls out groups like 'We the People', 'patriots', The 'Constitution Party,' and 'oath keepers' as groups which subscribe to unfounded conspiracy theories and are 'opposed to one world order'."

Smitherman's term expired in January 2015. He was succeeded by Ryan Sitton of Friendswood, who served with two other Republicans, David J. Porter of Lee County, who unseated former commissioner Victor G. Carrillo in the Republican primary in 2010 but retired in 2017, and Christi Craddick of Austin, who was elected in 2012 to fill the seat formerly held by Elizabeth Ames Jones but occupied in the preceding interim months by Buddy Garcia of Austin.

=== 2012 election ===
In 2012, Smitherman was the Republican nominee for the two years remaining in Williams' unexpired term on the Railroad Commission. In the July 31, 2012 runoff election, Smitherman defeated his fellow conservative Greg Parker, a county commissioner in Comal County. Smitherman led with 583,022 votes (62.1 percent) to Parker's 355,245 (37.9 percent). In the first primary, Smitherman had led Parker, 44 to 28 percent but failed to win the required outright majority for nomination.

In the November 6 general election, Smitherman was elected with 4,537,625 votes (73.76%) to 1,127,074 votes (18.32%) for Libertarian Jaime Perez and 486,485 votes (7.90%) for Green Party candidate Josh Wendel; no Democrat ran for the post. Shortly after his election, he stated his support for the Sunset Advisory Commission recommendation to rename the Railroad Commission to more accurately reflect its current functions.

In the May 27, 2014 runoff election, to choose a nominee to succeed Smitherman, Ryan Sitton defeated Wayne Christian, who had been the high votegetter in the primary but held his exact same percent in the runoff and therefore lost to Sitton, an oil and gas engineer from Friendswood. Sitton also lost the District 24 legislative primary in 2012 to fellow Republican Greg Bonnen of Galveston County.

== Personal life ==
Smitherman and his wife, the former Marijane Frede, reside in Austin. They have four children, two of whom graduated from Texas A&M, one of whom is at Southern Methodist University and one is at Princeton University. The Smithermans are active members of the non-denominational Austin Ridge Church in Austin.

Government offices
Preceded by Rebecca Klein	Commissioner of the Public Utility Commission of Texas; 2004–2011	Succeeded by Rolando Pablos
Preceded by Paul Hudson	Chairman of the Public Utility Commission of Texas; 2007–2011	Succeeded by Donna L. Nelson
Preceded by Michael L. Williams	Commissioner of the Railroad Commission of Texas; 2011–2015	Succeeded by Ryan Sitton
