= Bo French =

American politician and investor

Chair of Tarrant County Republican Party
- In office October 23, 2023 – November 12, 2025
- Preceded by: Rick Barnes
- Succeeded by: Tim Davis

Personal details
- Born: Richard West French; 1968 or 1969 (age 57–58) Fort Worth, Texas, U.S.
- Party: Republican
- Spouse: Sheridan French (div. 2014)
- Children: 4
- Education: Texas Christian University (BA)
- Website: Campaign website

Richard West "Bo" French (born 1968/1969) is an American Conservative far-right politician and investor. He was the Republican nominee for Texas Railroad Commissioner in the 2026 election, losing to Democratic state representative Jon Rosenthal. French is the former chair of the Tarrant County Republican Party. He has made numerous comments seen as anti-Muslim and anti-immigrant.

== Early life and career ==
Richard West French was born in 1968 or 1969 in Fort Worth and was raised in Midland, Texas. His family runs the Midland-based French Oil Company. He attended Texas Christian University. After graduating, French reportedly worked on his father's ranch before spending eight years at private equity firm Carlson Capital, then co-founded and served as chief operating officer of Verity Capital Partners and Trugent Capital.

=== Craft International ===
French was a business partner of Chris Kyle, the author of American Sniper, running law enforcement training company Craft International. Following Kyle's death in 2013, French and a business partner were sued by his widow Taya Kyle for allegedly forcing her out of the company. Although French and the partner denied the charge and the suit was later dropped, the parties reached a settlement agreement in November 2014 which stipulated French not use "Chris Kyle's name, likeness, logo or image."

== Political career ==
=== Texas House of Representatives campaigns ===
French unsuccessfully ran for the 99th district of the Texas House of Representatives in 2016 and 2018, losing in the Republican primary against incumbent Charlie Geren twice. In February 2016, lawyers for Taya Kyle sent French a cease and desist demanding that he stop using her late husband's name and image in campaign materials in violation of a November 2014 settlement agreement.

In March 2016 French created a Facebook page named "Thief Bill Waybourn" which criticized Tarrant County sheriff candidate Bill Waybourn whom Taya Kyle also served as campaign treasurer for. The page was criticized by the Tarrant County Law Enforcement Association Arlington Police Association and Dallas Police Association in a December 2017 joint statement which called on the Texas Ranger Division to investigate the page for digital impersonation of a peace officer, a class A misdemeanor or felony.

In December 2017, French and his then-wife, Sheridan, filed a lawsuit against Geren campaign operatives alleging that they had filed a falsified Child Protective Services report making false accusations of child abuse against the couple on the eve of the 2016 primary election. Geren campaign operative David Sorensen confessed and apologized for making the false report in November 2018.

=== Tarrant County Republican Party ===
French was elected to succeed Rick Barnes as chair of the Tarrant County Republican Party and was sworn in on October 23, 2023. French has since frequently posted on social media about his goal of making Tarrant County "inhospitable to Democrats." In June 2025, French posted a poll on his X account, asking "Who is a bigger threat to America?" with the two options "Jews" and "Muslims". Lieutenant Governor of Texas Dan Patrick criticized the poll as promoting antisemitism and religious bigotry, and called for French's resignation. French apologized for the post, but said he would not resign, saying he was not antisemitic, citing his support for Israel as evidence.

French frequently posted comments seen as Islamophobic while serving as the Tarrant County GOP chair. French accused state representative Salman Bhojani, the first Muslim in the Texas state legislature, of "furthering jihad" and called for his denaturalization and deportation. French also claimed that a Fort Worth imam was "deeply involved in pro-terrorist activity." In October 2025, French called for the deportation of a group of Native Americans photographed giving the middle finger to Mount Rushmore, referring to them as "third world savages". Later that month, he made a tweet referring to November 1 — when federal SNAP benefits were set to lapse due to a government shutdown — as "National Chimp Out Day". Following backlash, French denied the post was racist, and asserting his critics were the actual racists for "see[ing] racism where there clearly isn't". French has stated that the Great Replacement conspiracy theory is real. French has frequently used slurs seen as homophobic on social media, in addition to referring to political opponents as "retarded." French invited alt-right activist Jack Posobiec, who has praised the regimes of Augusto Pinochet and Francisco Franco, to speak before the Tarrant GOP. French resigned as chair of the Tarrant County Republican Party on November 12, 2025, and was succeeded by attorney Tim Davis.

=== Texas Railroad Commissioner campaign ===
French ran for Texas Railroad Commissioner, challenging incumbent Jim Wright in the Republican primary. French said his goals as Texas Railroad Commissioner would be to "defend Texas, stop the Islamic invasion, and defeat the left." In March 2026, French spoke at the Conservative Political Action Conference (CPAC) in Grapevine, Texas, at a panel warning of the implementation of sharia, or Islamic law, in Texas. At the panel, French said "The problem is, we call it Sharia [law], but the problem is actually Islam," French said. "If they can infiltrate Texas and conquer Texas, then what's going to happen? They're going to be able to control the United States." French further said the Immigration and Nationality Act of 1965 allowed immigration from "lots of places in the world whose culture and values do not align with America." He called for the deportation of 100 million people from the United States, just under a third of the nation's population. French additionally called for the deportation of all Muslims from the United States. French further called for banning Islam.

KUT News noted that French "has spoken more about Islam and diversity, equity and inclusion, or DEI, initiatives on the campaign trail than the energy industry." Oil and gas regulation is the primary responsibility of the Texas Railroad Commission. French said he would direct the Texas Railroad Commission to curb Islamic and Chinese influence in Texas oil fields and support Israel and the nuclear family. Jim Wright criticized French's priorities as irrelevant, saying that the Texas Railroad Commission "has nothing to do" with Islam, DEI, or the Chinese Communist Party. According to The Texas Observer, French engaged in a "MAGA culture war", and utilizes political language derived from "fascist blood-and-soil rhetoric" popular 100 years ago during the Völkisch movement.

In the March 2026 Republican primary, French received 31.75% of the vote, slightly less than Wright's 32.1% of the vote. With neither candidate winning a majority, the vote proceeded to a runoff. French's campaign was supported by hardline conservative billionaires Tim Dunn and Farris Wilks, who spent a million dollars on the campaign through their political action committee. French referred to Wright as "Jihadi Jim", accusing him of allowing sharia law in Texas. French narrowly defeated Wright in the runoff, becoming the Republican nominee for Texas Railroad Commissioner. French was subsequently endorsed by Governor of Texas Greg Abbott, despite Abbott previously warning that French would "wreck" oil production and that French "doesn't know anything about oil and gas."

Following his primary victory, French posted a meme depicting his Democratic opponent in the general election, Jon Rosenthal, inside the chamber where the Romanov family was executed. French further accused Rosenthal, who is Jewish, of "mocking Christianity, the Virgin Birth, and Christian Communion, while voting against religious liberty and for the spread of Islam." To some, French appeared to be referencing the antisemitic Judeo-Bolshevik conspiracy theory. French further called for the United States to become like the white supremacist state of Rhodesia and called for the deportation of Chinese individuals, writing that it was "time to go round up all the Chinese and send them packing!"

In June 2026, French declared, "I won't rest until every Muslim is gone."

In September 2026, French posted controversial comments in response to a photo of brown students cheering on the Texas Longhorns at a college football game. French said the picture showed "how many Americans have been displaced by foreigners." He further posted that "I heard UT graduation this year looked like this. I didn't believe it. The problem is now obviously far worse than anyone imagined." Senator John Cornyn criticized French, writing "This is the Republican nominee for statewide office. Are other Republican elected officials going to condemn the intolerance and racism, or look the other way while it becomes normalized. This is how great political parties self-destruct. Sad." Some UT Austin students called French's remarks "disgusting" and criticized subsequent posts on social media as xenophobic and divisive. Republican strategist Karl Rove called French a "bigot" and said he would support his Democratic opponent instead. According to The Texas Tribune, French has a "long and well-documented history of routinely racist, antisemitic, homophobic, able-ist and anti-trans comments on social media".

In September 2026, CNN's Andrew Kaczynski reported that French had deleted tweets calling for the execution of various public figures. French called for Barack Obama to be executed after Donald Trump accused Obama of lying about Russian interference in the Russian interference in the 2016 United States elections. French posted "The penalty for treason used to be death. Even for a former president. #HangEmHigh" and "I want more than perp walks. I want public executions". French additionally called for the execution of Senator Adam Schiff and for the execution of public officials identified by D.O.G.E..

In November 2026, French lost to Jon Rosenthal in the race for Texas Railroad Commissioner.

== Political positions ==
French has expressed support for deporting all Muslim Americans, as well as 100 million people more broadly.

French has strongly criticized H-1B visa programs, claiming they have been used to "replace" Americans with "low IQ ... non assimilating third worlders", which was widely seen as racially targeting the Indian American community. He also has a history of making similar anti-Indian social media posts, which are widely perceived as driven more by prejudice than substantive policy.

== Personal life ==
French was previously married to fashion designer Sheridan French until they divorced in 2014. He has four children.

== Electoral history ==
=== 2026 ===
2026 Texas Railroad Commissioner Republican primary
Party	Candidate	Votes	%
Republican	Jim Wright (incumbent)	620,959	32.1
Republican	Bo French	614,178	31.7
Republican	James Matlock	373,047	19.3
Republican	Katherine Culbert	178,175	9.2
Republican	Hawk Dunlap	148,303	7.7
Total votes		1,934,672	100.0

2026 Texas Railroad Commissioner Republican primary runoff
Party	Candidate	Votes	%
Republican	Bo French	664,425	50.6
Republican	Jim Wright (incumbent)	649,811	49.4
Total votes		1,314,236	100.0

2026 Texas Railroad Commissioner
Party	Candidate	Votes	%
Democratic	Jon Rosenthal	5,103,317	52.5
Republican	Bo French	4,426,549	45.6
Libertarian	Arthur DiBianca	188,001	1.9
Total votes		9,717,867	>99.0

=== 2018 ===
2018 Texas House of Representatives, 99th district Republican primary
Party	Candidate	Votes	%
Republican	Charlie Geren (incumbent)	7,935	56.82
Republican	Bo French	6,030	43.18
Total votes		13,965	100.0

=== 2016 ===
2016 Texas House of Representatives, 99th district Republican primary
Party	Candidate	Votes	%
Republican	Charlie Geren (incumbent)	13,312	58.23
Republican	Bo French	9,551	41.77
Total votes		22,863	100.0
