= Jon Rosenthal =

American engineer and politician (born 1963)

- Rosenthal in 2026

Railroad Commissioner-elect of Texas
- Assuming office January 3, 2027
- Governor: Greg Abbott; Gina Hinojosa (elect)
- Succeeding: Jim Wright

Member of the Texas House of Representatives from the 135th district
- Incumbent
- Assumed office January 8, 2019
- Preceded by: Gary Elkins

Personal details
- Born: Jon Eric Rosenthal; August 17, 1963 (age 63) Stanford, California, U.S.
- Party: Democratic
- Spouse: Aminta Rosenthal
- Children: 2
- Parent: Haskell P. Rosenthal (father)
- Education: University of Texas at Austin (BS); University of Houston (GrCert)
- Website: Campaign website

Jon Eric Rosenthal (born August 17, 1963) is an American engineer and politician who is a member-elect of the Railroad Commission of Texas. A member of the Democratic Party, he has represented the 135th district in the Texas House of Representatives since 2019.

Rosenthal ran for Texas Railroad Commissioner in the 2026 election, winning the Democratic nomination unopposed and defeating Republican nominee Bo French in the general election.

== Early life and career ==
Rosenthal was born at Stanford University Hospital in Stanford, California, in 1963 and has lived in Texas since 1979. His father, Haskell P. Rosenthal, was the John T. Stuart III Centennial Professor of Mathematics at the University of Texas at Austin, and his mother, Maryon Nagles-Gonzalez, is a retired cosmetics sales director. At 14, he spent a year in Israel while his father took a sabbatical at the Hebrew University of Jerusalem and became conversational in Hebrew through taking classes. He earned a Bachelor of Science in mechanical engineering from the University of Texas at Austin in 1991 and a graduate certificate in subsea engineering from the University of Houston in 2016.

Prior to his election to the House of Representatives, Rosenthal founded an Indivisible group in Texas's 7th congressional district. He has worked for over 25 years as a Project Manager, Engineering Manager, and Subsea Systems Engineer in and around the oil and gas industry.

== Texas House of Representatives ==
Rosenthal speaking at a Texans for Public Education event on May 19, 2018

Rosenthal was sworn into the Texas House on January 8, 2019, after winning the November 2018 general election. He defeated 12-term incumbent Republican Gary Elkins.

As a freshman member of the 86th Legislative Session, Rosenthal was appointed to the House Committee on County Affairs and the House Committee on Energy Resources. Rosenthal was honored as the Freshman of the Year by the Texas Legislative Study Group.

== 2026 Texas Railroad Commission campaign ==
On September 29, 2025, Rosenthal announced he would run for the Texas Railroad Commission in the 2026 election. He won the Democratic Party primary unopposed and faced Republican nominee Bo French in the general election. Rosenthal emphasized his professional background as an oil field engineer on the campaign trail and supports expanding the Railroad Commission's budget so it can retain employees, address unplugged wells and manage oil field wastewater. During the campaign, he described himself as a “drill, baby, drill Democrat.”

On September 13, 2026, French made a series of posts on X about a photo of students of South Asian descent cheering on the Texas Longhorns at a college football game. French said the picture showed a "problem" and "expos[ed] how many Americans have been displaced by foreigners." The post received widespread backlash condemning French's commentary as racist including from Republican U.S. Senator John Cornyn. Following the tweets, Rosenthal's campaign received endorsements from several Republicans including current Mayor of Fort Worth Mattie Parker, former White House deputy chief of staff for policy Karl Rove, and former candidate for Railroad Commission in the Republican primary Hawk Dunlap. The incident raised the profile of the race nationally and Rosenthal subsequently raised about $488,000, of which 60% came from Texan small donors, from donors across 49 states.

Rosenthal won the general election in an upset, becoming the first Democrat to win a seat on the Railroad Commission since 1990. Rosenthal also became the first Jewish Railroad Commissioner.

== Personal life ==
Rosenthal has resided in Northwest Houston since 2007. He is married to his wife, Aminta, and they have two adult children. He was raised in an interfaith household, with a Reform Jewish father and Baptist Christian mother, and identifies as both agnostic and "multireligious".
