= Steve Allison =

American politician (born 1947)

Member of the Texas House of Representatives from the 121st district
- In office January 8, 2019 – January 14, 2025
- Preceded by: Joe Straus
- Succeeded by: Marc LaHood

Personal details
- Born: Stephen Philip Allison; January 4, 1947 (age 79)
- Party: Republican
- Spouse: Peggy
- Occupation: Attorney

Stephen Philip Allison (born January 4, 1947) is an American politician who represented the 121st district in the Texas House of Representatives from 2019 to 2025.

== Personal life ==
Allison is a graduate of Texas Christian University, he met his wife Peggy while attending the school. He also attended University of Houston Law Center. Allison and his wife Peggy have 2 children, and are both members of St. Mark’s Episcopal Church where they both have taught Sunday school. He is an attorney.

== Political career ==
=== Early political career ===
Allison has served on the Alamo Heights Independent School District Early Childhood Task Force, and on the VIA Metropolitan Transit Authority Board of Trustees for 8 years and the last 2 as Vice Chairman.

Allison was elected to represent District 121 in the Texas House of Representatives on November 6, 2018 and was sworn in on January 8, 2019. Alison ran with the endorsement of the outgoing state representative for the seat, retiring House Speaker Joe Straus.

=== Voucher vote and 2024 primary defeat ===
In November 2023, Allison voted against Republican Governor Greg Abbott's proposal for state-funded vouchers for private schools. Allison was one of 21 Republicans who joined all Democrats in voting to remove Abbott's voucher plan from the education funding bill; the amendment to drop the voucher proposal passed 83–64. After his vote, Allison reported being harassed at his home by pro-school choice activists.

Allion's vote against Abbott's voucher proposal also prompted primary challengers. Primary challenger criminal defense attorney Marc LaHood ran with endorsements from Abbott and other Texas Republicans. Allison was also the target of coordinated efforts by several PACs backed by Pennsylvania businessman Jeff Yass to defeat Republicans who opposed the voucher plan.

Although Allison had a conservative voting record on nearly every issue, LaHood ran to his right, and his primary challenge was boosted by support from Abbott (who spent $672,000 on LaHood's behalf in the final months of the primary campaign). Texas's Republican Agriculture Commissioner, Sid Miller, ran a pro-LaHood ad in which he posed with a rifle and declared that Allison was the target of his "Rino hunt." Allison, meanwhile, was supported by House Speaker Dade Phelan, and ran with the endorsement of the San Antonio Express-News.

In the March 2024 primary, Allison was defeated for renomination: LaHood won with some 54% of the vote; Allison received 34%, and a third candidate, Michael Champion, received 7%. The Express-News editorial board described Allison's loss as an intensification of the removal of "traditional, pragmatic conservative Republicans" by the state party.

=== Elections ===
==== 2018 ====
Republican primary runoff for Texas House of Representatives District 121, 2018
Party	Candidate	Votes	%
Republican	Steve Allison	6,054	57.5%
Republican	Matt Beebe	4,482	42.5%

General election for Texas House of Representatives District 121, 2018
Party	Candidate	Votes	%
Republican	Steve Allison	38,843	53.2
Democratic	Celina Montoya	32,679	44.7
Libertarian	Mallory Olfers	1,529	2.1
