= Marc LaHood =

American politician

Member of the Texas House of Representatives from the 121st district
- Incumbent
- Assumed office January 14, 2025
- Preceded by: Steve Allison
- Succeeded by: Zack Dunn (elect)

Personal details
- Born: Marc Andrew Lahood; September 12, 1978 (age 48) San Antonio, Texas, U.S.
- Party: Republican
- Relatives: Nico LaHood (brother)
- Education: Trinity University; St. Mary's School of Law

Marc Andrew LaHood (born September 12, 1978) is an American politician. He represents the 121st district in the Texas House of Representatives.

== Early life and career ==
LaHood was born and raised in San Antonio, Texas, where he graduated from the Texas Military Institute. His brother, Nico LaHood, previously served as district attorney of Bexar County, Texas. LaHood's other brother, Michael Jr., was murdered in the driveway of his parents' house after a failed robbery in August 1996. The triggerman, Mauriceo Mashawn Brown, and driver, Kenneth Foster Jr., were both sentenced to death in May 1997. Brown was executed for the crime by lethal injection in July 2006 while Foster's death sentence was commuted by Governor Rick Perry in August 2007.

He attended Trinity University, earning his bachelor's degree. He also attended St. Mary's School of Law, earning his Juris Doctor degree.

== Political career ==
In March 2024, LaHood defeated incumbent Steve Allison and Michael Champion in the Republican primary election for the 121st district of the Texas House of Representatives. In November 2024, he defeated Democratic nominee Laurel Swift in the general election, winning 52 percent of the vote. He assumed office on January 14, 2025.
