= Elizabeth Ames Jones =

American politician (born 1956)

Railroad Commissioner of Texas
- In office February 9, 2005 – February 28, 2012
- Governor: Rick Perry
- Preceded by: Charles Matthews
- Succeeded by: Buddy Garcia

Member of the Texas House of Representatives from the 121st district
- In office January 9, 2001 – January 11, 2005
- Preceded by: Bill Siebert
- Succeeded by: Joe Straus

Personal details
- Born: October 29, 1956 (age 69) San Antonio, Texas, U.S.
- Party: Republican
- Education: University of Texas at Austin

Elizabeth Ames Jones (born October 29, 1956) is a former member of the Texas House of Representatives and the Texas Railroad Commission, the regulatory body over petroleum and natural gas.

== Biography ==
From 2000 to 2005, Jones held the District 121 seat from Bexar County in the Texas House. In the Republican primary held on March 14, 2000, she defeated incumbent Representative [Bill Siebert, who had held the position since 1993. The tabulation was 8,053 votes (66.4 percent) to 4,082 (33.6 percent). At the time she unseated Siebert, Jones was a political unknown from the Alamo Heights section of San Antonio.

Jones was re-elected to the state House in 2002 and 2004. In her second legislative term, she was elected vice chairman of the House Republican Caucus, the first woman in that leadership position.

In January 2005, she stepped down from the legislature to accept an appointment from Governor Rick Perry to fill the vacancy on the Railroad Commission created by the resignation of Charles R. Matthews. Sworn into the office of railroad commissioner on March 2, 2005, Jones became the third woman to serve as chairman in the history of the commission. In 2006, Jones was elected to a full term on the Railroad Commission, having defeated the Democrat Dale Henry of Lampasas, but resigned eleven months before her term expired.

In 2008, Jones announced in Bryan, Texas, that she would run for the United States Senate seat expected to be vacated by fellow Republican Kay Bailey Hutchison. On November 7, 2011, however, Jones announced that she was ending her U.S. Senate campaign and instead would run for the District 25 seat in the Texas State Senate against veteran Republican Jeff Wentworth in the Republican primary held on May 29, 2012. With approximately 31% of the vote, Jones finished third and was eliminated from the runoff election that was held on July 31, 2012.

Preceded by Bill Siebert	Texas State Representative from District 121 (Bexar County); 2001–2005	Succeeded by Joe Straus
Preceded by Charles R. Matthews	Texas Railroad Commissioner; 2005–2012	Succeeded by Buddy Garcia
