= Jim Wright (commissioner) =

21st-century American politician from Texas

Railroad Commissioner of Texas
- Incumbent
- Assumed office January 4, 2021
- Governor: Greg Abbott
- Preceded by: Ryan Sitton
- Succeeded by: Jon Rosenthal (elect)

Personal details
- Born: 1961 or 1962 (age 64–65)
- Party: Republican

James "Jim" Wright (born 1961/1962) is an American businessman and politician who has served as a member of the Railroad Commission of Texas since 2021. A member of the Republican Party, Wright owns several environmental services companies.

A native of south Texas, Wright defeated incumbent Ryan Sitton in a primary, then won the general election held on November 3, 2020, against Chrysta Castañeda.

Wright ran for reelection in 2026. Between February and May, he and former Tarrant County Republican Party Chair Bo French collectively raised more than $3 million in campaign contributions. Wright received significant financial backing from oil and gas companies and industry trade associations, while French's campaign was supported primarily by conservative megadonors. In the Republican primary, Wright received the most votes but failed to reach a majority, triggering a runoff against French. Though he received the endorsements of Governor Greg Abbott, Lieutenant Governor Dan Patrick, and House Speaker Dustin Burrows, Wright narrowly lost renomination in the May runoff, receiving 49.6% of the vote.

Political offices
Preceded by Ryan Sitton	Member of the Texas Railroad Commission; 2021–present Served alongside: Christi Craddick, Wayne Christian	Incumbent
