= James E. Nugent =

American politician

James Edward "Jim" Nugent

Railroad Commissioner of Texas
- In office January 4, 1979 – January 2, 1995
- Governor: Bill Clements (1979–83); Mark White (1983–87); Bill Clements (1987–91); Ann Richards (1991–95)
- Preceded by: Jon Newton
- Succeeded by: Charles Matthews

Member of the Texas House of Representatives
- In office January 10, 1961 – January 3, 1979
- Preceded by: Joseph Burkett
- Succeeded by: Gerald Geistweidt

Personal details
- Born: June 24, 1922 San Angelo, Texas, U.S.
- Died: July 17, 2016 (aged 94) Austin, Texas, U.S.
- Resting place: Texas State Cemetery
- Party: Democratic
- Spouse: Billie Louise Merritt (died 2002)
- Children: 2
- Education: Schreiner College (BA); University of Texas at Austin (JD)
- Occupation: Lawyer

Military service
- Allegiance: United States
- Branch/service: United States Navy
- Rank: Flier
- Battles/wars: World War II

James Edward "Jim" Nugent (June 24, 1922 – July 17, 2016) was an American politician and lawyer. A member of the Democratic Party, Nugent served as a member of the Texas Railroad Commission, which regulates the state's energy industries, from 1979 to 1995.

== Political life ==
Nugent graduated in 1941 from Schreiner College in Kerrville, Texas. He then attended from 1946 to 1949 the University of Texas School of Law in Austin, from which he received his Juris Doctor degree. That same year, he became the county attorney in his native Kerr County, a position that he retained until 1954.

From 1961 to 1979, Nugent was a member of the Texas House of Representatives from District 56, previously designated by several other numbers. Nugent served as Speaker Pro Tem in his last legislative term from 1977 to 1979.

In 1973, Representative Nugent was the author of the 215-page House Bill 1, designed to establish procedures for transparency in state government. The measure forced candidates to make their incomes public information. They were also required to reveal detailed information on their campaign expenses. The law also allowed greater public access to government meetings and records. It was not a reaction to the 1972 banking fraud scandal known as Sharpstown but had been introduced in several previous sessions. Nugent said that he did not object to money in campaigns. "We all needed money to run our campaigns. I just thought the public was better off knowing where everybody was getting their money. I just don't think the Legislature wanted it passed," Nugent said.

In 1978, Nugent was first elected to an unexpired four-year term on the Railroad Commission to succeed fellow Democrat Jon Newton. He was reelected to full six-year terms in 1982 and 1988.

However, on November 8, 1994, Nugent was narrowly unseated by the Republican Charles R. Matthews, a former mayor of Garland, Texas. Matthews led with 2,046,614 votes (49.8 percent) to Nugent's 1,978,759 (48.1 percent). A third candidate, Libertarian Rich Draheim, held the remaining 84,769 (2.1 percent) of the ballots cast.

== Family ==
Nugent was married to the former Billie Louise Merritt (1921-2002), who is interred in Austin at the Texas State Cemetery, which is open to state legislators and certain other government officials and their spouses. Mrs. Nugent was previously married to Calvin Cocke Trammell, Sr. (1921-1962). In 1956, after a divorce, she married Nugent, and the couple had a daughter in Kerrville, Billie Nan Nugent (born 1959). Nugent's stepson is Calvin "Skip" Trammell, Jr. (born 1943), also a Kerrville native.

Bille Nan Nugent's former husband, Joe Cotten (born c. 1951) of Frisco ran unsuccessfully as a Republican for the Railroad Commission in the 2012 primary election. He attributed his relationship to James Nugent, his former father-in-law as having inspired him to make the race.

Political offices
Preceded by Jon Newton	Texas Railroad Commissioner; 1979-1995	Succeeded by Charles R. Matthews
Preceded by Joseph Burkett	Texas State Representative from Kerr County; 1961-1979	Succeeded by Gerald Geistweidt
