= Buddy Garcia =

Hector Steven "Buddy" Garcia

Railroad Commissioner of Texas
- In office April 12, 2012 – November 7, 2012
- Governor: Rick Perry
- Preceded by: Elizabeth Ames Jones
- Succeeded by: Christi Craddick

Personal details
- Born: June 16, 1967 (age 59) Nueces County, Texas, U.S.
- Party: Republican
- Other political affiliations: Democratic
- Education: Texas State University (BA)

Hector Steven Garcia, known as H. S. "Buddy" Garcia (born June 16, 1967), is a former interim member of the Texas Railroad Commission, the elected body which regulates the oil and natural gas industries in Texas. Garcia was appointed to the commission by Governor Rick Perry on April 12, 2012, to replace Elizabeth Ames Jones, who resigned to run unsuccessfully for the Texas State Senate. Garcia's appointment expired a few days after the November 6 general election, and he was succeeded by fellow Republican Christi Craddick, who defeated a Democrat, Dale Henry, to claim the position for six years. Craddick is the daughter of the former Speaker of the Texas House of Representatives Tom Craddick of Midland.

A resident of Austin, Garcia served from January 2007 until his April 2012 appointment to the railroad position as a commissioner at the Texas Commission on Environmental Quality. He is a past deputy Texas Secretary of State and a former state border commerce coordinator. He is a member of the Texas Coastal Land Advisory Board and the Gulf of Mexico Alliance. Garcia is a former deputy legislative director for Perry and special assistant to the governor for Texas/Mexico border issues.

Garcia graduated from Saint Josephs Academy in Brownsville, Texas. He first attended Texas A&M University - Kingsville on an academic scholarship and played football there, but he transferred after a year to Texas State University in San Marcos, from which he received a degree in political science in 1990. He is a former staff member for State Senator Eddie Lucio, Jr., a pro-life Democrat from Brownsville. He served on Perry's staff when Perry was lieutenant governor from 1999 to 2000. Garcia is a former deputy legislative director for Perry and special assistant to the governor for Texas/Mexico border issues.
