= Zack Dunn =

American politician

Member-elect of the Texas House of Representatives from the 121st district
- Assuming office January 2027
- Succeeding: Marc LaHood

Personal details
- Party: Democratic
- Education: University of Texas, San Antonio (BBA) University of Pennsylvania (JD)

Zack Dunn is an American politician. A member of the Democratic Party, he is the member-elect for the 121st district of the Texas House of Representatives.

Dunn was student body president while attending the University of Texas at San Antonio.

== Electoral history ==
2026 Texas House of Representatives election: District 121
Party	Candidate	Votes	%	±%
Democratic	Zack Dunn	45,990	54.1%	
Republican	Marc LaHood	39,076	49.5%	
