= Ryan Sitton =

American politician (born 1975)

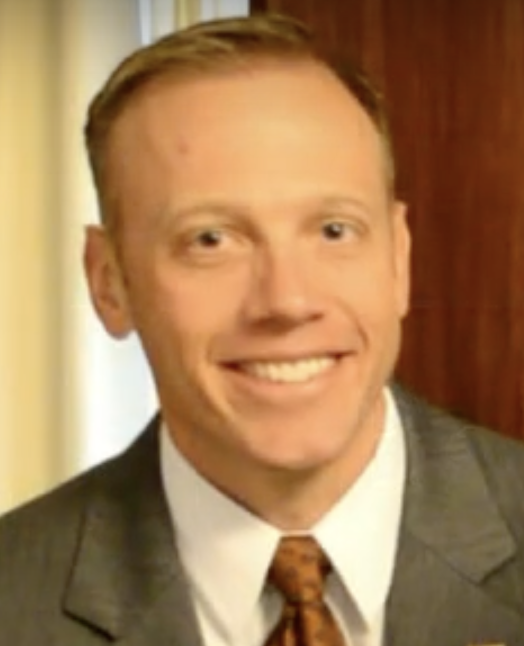
- Sitton in 2013

Railroad Commissioner of Texas
- In office January 5, 2015 – January 4, 2021
- Governor: Greg Abbott
- Preceded by: Barry T. Smitherman
- Succeeded by: Jim Wright

Personal details
- Born: Ryan Christopher Sitton; 1975 (age 50–51) Irving, Texas, U.S.
- Party: Republican
- Spouse: Jennifer Sitton
- Children: 3
- Education: Texas A&M University (BS)
- Website: Official website

Ryan Christopher Sitton (born 1975) is an American politician who served as a member of the Texas Railroad Commission from 2015 to 2021. He is a member of the Republican Party.

== Personal life and education ==
Sitton was raised in Irving, Texas with his three siblings by his mother and father, both high school science teachers. Sitton displayed a talent for math and science. Sitton attended Cistercian Preparatory School and went on to study Mechanical Engineering at Texas A&M University where he met his wife, Jennifer, also a mechanical engineering major.

The couple has three children and belongs to St. Andrews Episcopal Church. Outside of his professional work, Sitton exercises daily using the P90X fitness program and owns a collection of more than 100,000 Legos.

== Business career ==
Sitton spent his early career working for oil and gas companies, including ALCOA, Oxy, Marathon, and Berwanger Engineering and Consulting. In 2006, the Sittons founded PinnacleART, an engineering and technology company. PinnacleART operates on solar power with natural gas backups.

== Political career ==
=== 2012 Texas House of Representatives race ===
In 2012, Sitton lost a runoff contest with fellow Republican Greg Bonnen in Galveston County for the District 24 seat in the Texas House of Representatives.

=== Texas Railroad Commissioner ===
Incumbent officeholder Barry Smitherman decided to run, unsuccessfully, for state attorney general, thus creating an open seat. Sitton announced his candidacy for the Railroad Commission.

Sitton polled 398,652 votes (57.3 percent) to Christian's 297,654 (42.7 percent). Sitton outspent Christian by a large amount.

Sitton faced Steve Brown, a Democratic businessman from Houston, Libertarian Party candidate Mark Miller, and Green Party candidate Martina Salinas. Sitton won the general election with 58% of the vote.

Sitton was sworn in on January 5, 2015, succeeding outgoing Commissioner Barry Smitherman. He is the first mechanical engineer to serve on the Commission in 50 years.

In December 2016, Sitton praised President Donald Trump's choice for EPA head, Scott Pruitt, predicting that Trump and Pruitt's reduction of federal regulations would lead to an oil boom.

In 2017, Sitton voted in favor of Exxon Mobil in a regulation issue. He did not, however, disclose that Exxon Mobil is a client of his company, PinnacleART.

In 2019, Sitton was passed over for Railroad Commission chairman, a break from tradition since the incumbent closest to re-election is usually chosen.

In 2020, Sitton lost the Republican primary for reelection to Jim Wright, despite having the support of the Texas governor, lieutenant governor, and both of the state's senators. Sitton's campaign had raised $2 million more than Wright's $13,000 campaign.

Sitton played a significant role in the 2020 Russia–Saudi Arabia oil price war.

In 2020, Sitton returned to work as CEO at PinnacleART.

== Election history ==
Ryan Sitton electoral history

2014

Railroad Commission, Republican Party Primary Runoff, May 27, 2014
Party	Candidate	Votes	%
Republican	Ryan Sitton	239,251	60.20
Republican	Wayne Christian	158,147	39.79
Total votes		696,821	100

Railroad Commission, Republican primary results, March 04, 2014
Party	Candidate	Votes	%
Republican	Wayne Christian	503,634	42.68
Republican	Ryan Sitton	360,125	30.52
Republican	Becky Berger	198,672	16.83
Republican	Malachi Boyuls	117,511	9.95
Total votes		1,179,942	100

2012

State Representative District 24, Republican Party Primary Runoff, July 31, 2012
Party	Candidate	Votes	%
Republican	Greg Bonnen	8,608	57.72
Republican	Ryan Sitton	6,305	42.27
Total votes		14,913	100

State Representative District 24, Republican primary results, May 29, 2012
Party	Candidate	Votes	%
Republican	Greg Bonnen	6,951	45.06
Republican	Ryan Sitton	5,035	32.63
Republican	Heidi Thiess	3,440	22.3
Total votes		15,426	100

== Awards ==
- 2015: Houston Business Journal's 40 under 40 list.
- 2015: Distinguished Engineering Alumnus, Texas A&M University.
- 2016: Hearst Energy Award for Government Service.

Political offices
Preceded by Barry Smitherman	Member of the Texas Railroad Commission; 2015–2021	Succeeded by Jim Wright
