= Ray Keller =

American politician

Ray Keller is an American politician from the state of Texas. He served in the Texas House of Representatives from 1979 through 1987. He is a candidate for Texas Railroad Commissioner in the 2014 elections.

Keller is from North Richland Hills, Texas.
