= Charles Matthews (Texas politician) =

American politician in Texas (born 1939)

Charles Ray Matthews

Railroad Commissioner of Texas
- In office January 3, 1995 – January 31, 2005
- Governor: George W. Bush (1995–2000); Rick Perry (2000–2005)
- Preceded by: James E. Nugent
- Succeeded by: Elizabeth Ames Jones

Chancellor of the Texas State University System
- In office 2005–2010
- Preceded by: Lamar Urbanovsky
- Succeeded by: Brian McCall

Mayor of Garland, Texas
- In office 1984–1986

Personal details
- Born: May 19, 1939 (age 87) Waco, Texas, U.S.
- Party: Republican
- Education: University of Texas at Dallas (BA); Texas State University (MPA); University of Texas at Austin (PhD)
- Occupation: Businessman, teacher, politician

Charles Ray Matthews (born May 19, 1939) is a former member and chairman of the Texas Railroad Commission and the chancellor-emeritus of the Texas State University System. Based in Austin, Texas, his service on the Railroad Commission extended from 1995 to 2005; as chancellor, from 2005 to 2010.

== Background ==
A native of Waco, Texas, Matthews received his higher education later in life, having graduated with a bachelor's degree in interdisciplinary studies in 1994 from the University of Texas at Dallas. In 1999, he received a master's degree in public administration from Texas State University in San Marcos, then known as Southwest Texas State University. In 2006, he was awarded a PhD in higher education administration from the University of Texas at Austin.

== Political career ==
From 1984 to 1986, Matthews was the mayor of Garland, Texas, a nonpartisan position in which he worked to reduce the tax rate and to cut municipal expenditures. In 1986, he lost a race for county judge in Dallas County.

In 1994, he unseated veteran Democratic Railroad Commissioner James E. Nugent. Matthews outpolled Nugent, 2,046,614 votes (49.8 percent) to 1,978,759 (48.1 percent). Another 84,769 votes were cast (2.1 percent) for the Libertarian Rich Draheim. In 2000, Matthews won reelection to the Railroad Commission without Democratic opposition. He received 3,633,901 votes (77 percent), with the remaining 23 percent split between two minor party contenders.

As railroad commissioner, Matthews supported more exploration for natural gas to meet future electricity needs.

== TSU system chancellorship ==
Early in 2005, Matthews stepped down from the Railroad Commission to succeed Lamar Urbanovsky as the university system chancellor. Matthews served on the Texas Turnpike Authority under appointment from Republican Governor Bill Clements. He is a former director, president, and chief executive officer of the Texas Municipal Power Agency.

Originally established in 1911 to supervise the normal schools of Texas, the TSU system, which Matthews headed for five years, consists of nine institutions: Texas State University-San Marcos, Angelo State University in San Angelo, Sam Houston State University in Huntsville, Lamar University in Beaumont, the Lamar Institute of Technology, Lamar State College-Orange, Lamar State College-Port Arthur, Sul Ross State University in Alpine, and Rio Grande College of Sul Ross State University. These schools enroll more than seventy thousand students.

== Personal life ==
Matthews is the former president of Housing Administrators, Inc., president and CEO of M Mortgage Company, a director of Southern Bank and Trust/Texas Commerce Bank, and the owner/operator of Matthews Investments. He is a former member of the Interstate Oil and Gas Compact Commission and the National Coal Council.

Matthews has been active in Rotary International, the Lions Club, Young Men's Christian Association, and the Boy Scouts of America. He served as chairman of the Garland Chamber of Commerce and received the highest honor of the Garland business community, the Tall Texan Award. He and his wife, the former Julia Freeman (born January 19, 1945), a native of McAllen, Texas, reside in rural Aquilla near Hillsboro, Texas. They have four children.
