= Joe Straus =

American politician (born 1959)

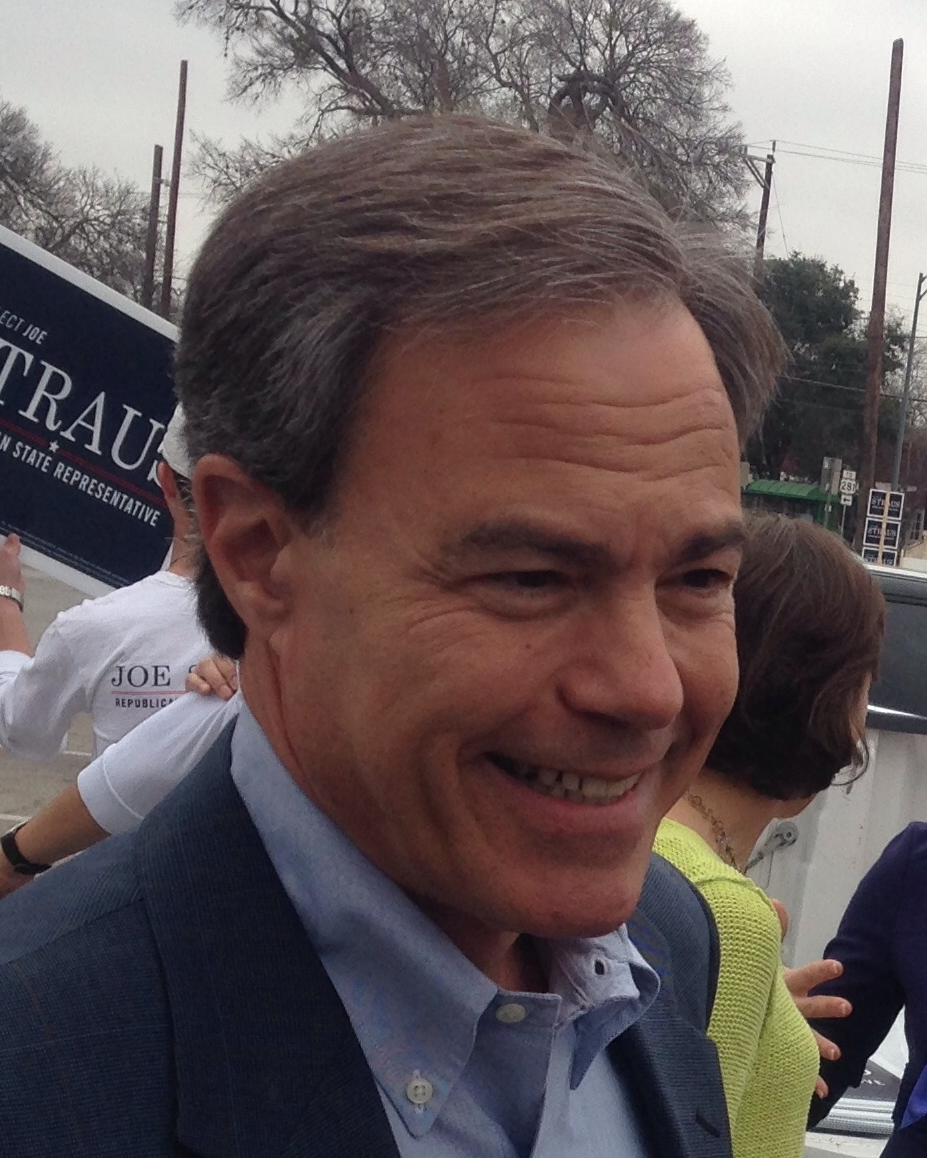

Speaker of the Texas House of Representatives
- In office January 13, 2009 – January 8, 2019
- Preceded by: Tom Craddick
- Succeeded by: Dennis Bonnen

Member of the Texas House of Representatives from the 121st district
- In office February 10, 2005 – January 8, 2019
- Preceded by: Elizabeth Ames Jones
- Succeeded by: Steve Allison

Personal details
- Born: Joseph Richard Straus III; September 1, 1959 (age 66) San Antonio, Texas, U.S.
- Party: Republican
- Spouse: Julie Brink
- Children: 2
- Education: Vanderbilt University (BA)
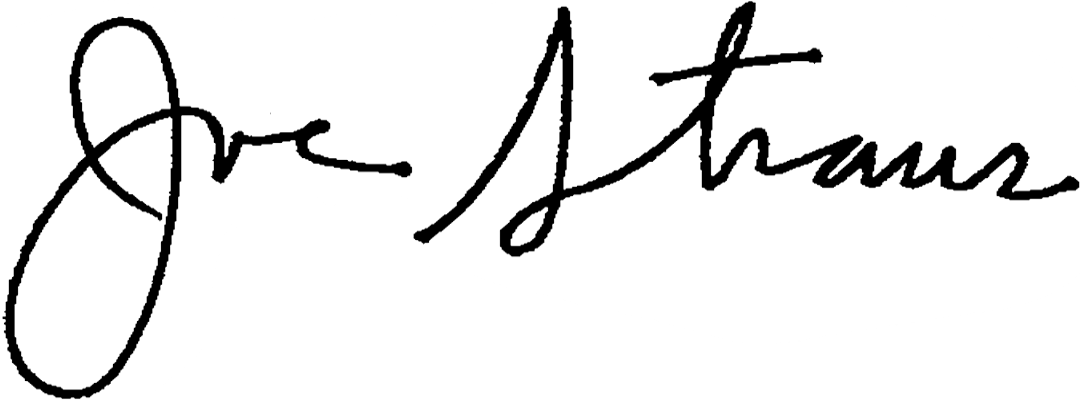
- Signature

Joseph Richard Straus III (born September 1, 1959) is an American politician who served as the speaker of the Texas House of Representatives from 2009 to 2019. A Republican, he represented District 121, which comprises northeastern Bexar County, including parts of San Antonio and several surrounding communities, from his first election to the House in 2005 until his retirement in 2019. He chose not to seek re-election to the state House in 2018.

During his career in the state House, Straus was a moderate, "business-friendly, country club Republican" who sometimes clashed with the party's social conservative wing. Toward the end of his five terms as speaker, Straus faced opposition from more conservative factions within the Texas Republican Party, led by Lieutenant Governor Dan Patrick, who regarded Straus as insufficiently conservative, and another conservative group that spent millions of dollars in attempts to defeat Straus and allied state legislators in Republican primary elections.

== Early life, education, and business career ==
Straus is a San Antonio native and a fifth-generation Texan. Straus came from a widely known Republican Party family. His mother, Jocelyn Levi Straus, was a Republican Party fundraiser and close friend of President George H. W. Bush and his wife, Barbara, during Bush's two U.S. Senate races and his bids for the White House. Jocelyn also had a prominent role in the campaigns of John Tower in the 1970s. His father was a major player in the horseracing business in San Antonio. Straus' family founded the Straus-Frank Saddlery Co. in San Antonio, which became a wholesale distribution business for guns and tires.

A graduate of Vanderbilt University, he has an insurance, investment, and executive benefit practice. He was former spokesman for the Retama Development Corporation, a development company that built the Retama Racetrack in San Antonio, which was for betting on horse racing.

== Political activity before Texas House ==
Straus has previously served on the Management Committee of the Bexar County Republican Party, as a precinct chairman, and on numerous campaign committees for federal, state, and local candidates. From 1989 through 1991, he served in the administration of President George H. W. Bush as deputy director of Business Liaison at the U.S. Department of Commerce and, earlier under President Ronald Reagan, as Executive Assistant to the Commissioner of Customs. In 1986, he was Campaign Manager in U.S. Representative Lamar S. Smith's first race for Congress.

== Texas House of Representatives ==
=== Elections to the Texas House ===
==== 2005 ====
Straus joined the House after winning a special election to replace District 121 state Representative Elizabeth Ames Jones in 2005.

==== 2012 ====
Straus was renominated to the Texas House in the Republican primary held on May 29, 2012. With 10,362 votes (62.9 percent), he defeated opponent Matt Stewart Beebe (born 1973), who polled 6,108 ballots (37.1 percent). In the November 6 general election, Straus faced no Democratic opponent and defeated the Libertarian nominee, Arthur M. Thomas, IV, 50,530 (80.2 percent) to 12,444 (19.8 percent).

==== 2014 ====
Straus was again renominated to the Texas House in the Republican primary held on March 4, 2014. He received 9,224 votes (61.2 percent) to 5,842 (38.8 percent) for Matt Beebe, who again challenged the speaker.

==== 2016 ====
Two Tea Party movement candidates, Shelia Vernette Bean and former Olmos Park City Council member Jeff M. Judson, challenged Straus in the primary election on March 1, 2016.

Straus raised $8 million for his 2016 primary contest with Bean and Judson. Judson, meanwhile, received a $50,000 contribution from a pastor and fracking entrepreneur, Farris Wilks of Cisco in Eastland County. Earlier, Wilks and his younger brother, Dan Wilks, contributed $15 million to a super political action committee supporting Ted Cruz for the 2016 Republican presidential nomination. Bean and Judson criticized Straus as having been insufficient aggressive in promoting anti-sanctuary cities legislation, abortion restrictions and school vouchers. Judson also challenged Straus on property taxes in Texas, although Texas property taxes are set by municipal officials, not state officials such as Straus, and although Texas has no state income taxes. In a campaign email, Judson invoked blamed a 2015 murder by a Mexican illegal immigrant on Straus; the email was criticized by Susan Pamerleau, who defended Straus, said that Judson's "use of a grieving father to accuse Joe Straus of a horrific murder committed by a career criminal is deplorable and irresponsible"; and said that "No one has done more to secure the border than" Straus. Straus said that his record includes improvements in the water infrastructure, transportation, and public and higher education. Straus was endorsed by the San Antonio Express-News, which hailed him as a "decent, effective leader [who] has focused on solving major problems that face the state, such as ... transportation and water" and noted that he successfully pushed to passage "conservative issues "on many fronts", including tough abortion restrictions, the defunding of Planned Parenthood, and the state's voter identification law.

Straus's San Antonio colleague, Republican Lyle Larson, in a campaign letter to the San Antonio Express-News, praised the speaker as "not flashy, nor is he politically motivated. He's just interested in getting the job done. ... [He] has led the Texas House in passing some of the most conservative and constructive legislation in Texas history ..." John Shields, a Republican former state representative and former member of the Texas State Board of Education, supported Judson.

Straus easily won the primary, receiving 15,737 votes (60.2 percent). Judson trailed with 7,434 votes (28.5 percent), and Bean drew 2,956 (11.3 percent). Straus then ran unopposed in the November 8 general election. The San Antonio Express-News called Straus' victory a "big win" and a "big repudiation" to conservatives who had tried unsuccessfully to pin a liberal label on Straus in hopes of defeating him for his legislative seat and thereby removing him as the speaker. The newspaper said Straus "treats everyone fairly, and that approach should be commended instead of condemned."

=== Speakership (2009–2019) ===
==== Election ====
Archconservative Tom Craddick of Midland was elected speaker of the House in 2003. Over his tenure, he earned enemies for an autocratic style, freezing out Democrats and financing challengers to incumbents in both parties. Republicans disgruntled with Craddick's leadership attempted to remove him at the end of the legislative session in 2007, but Craddick would not allow a vote to come to the floor.

In the 2008 elections, Republicans nearly lost their majority in the Texas House. Eleven moderate Republican members of the Texas House (known as "Anybody but Craddick" or "ABCs"), who included several powerful committee chairman, formed an alliance with Democrats to field a moderate Republican challenger to Craddick. On New Year's Day in 2009, the 11 chose Straus as a compromise candidate.

==== Tenure as speaker ====
Straus ran without opposition as speaker on January 13, 2009, at the beginning of the 81st Texas Legislature. Straus' election was seen as a defeat for the socially conservative wing of the Republican Party of Texas. Straus was the first Jewish speaker since Texas statehood, following David S. Kaufman, who was speaker of the Congress of the Republic of Texas from 1839 to 1841.

He was reelected to a fourth two-year term as speaker six years later on January 13, 2015, in the first recorded vote for speaker in forty years.

After becoming speaker, Straus appointed 18 Republicans and 16 Democrats to committee chairmanships, which reflected the 76-74 makeup of the House. Republicans continued to chair major committees including Appropriations, Calendars, Public Education and State Affairs.

In January 2013, Straus faced intraparty conservative opposition for a third term as speaker from Representative David Simpson of Longview. Simpson entered the race for speaker in December 2012, after Straus' previous opponent, conservative Bryan Hughes of Mineola, withdrew from the contest after nearly six months of seeking commitments from colleagues. However, Simpson withdrew before the balloting for speaker began, and Straus was reelected without opposition on January 8, 2013. Rep. Todd Ames Hunter, a Republican from Corpus Christi, pointed to Straus' even-handed approach to leadership as the reason for his success in keeping the gavel. "The Speaker is exceptional in working with members, said Hunter, an ally of the speaker. "What you've seen within the last week is he has a strong, diverse support base."

In January 2015, Straus was challenged again as speaker by Representative Scott Turner, an African American from Frisco. It was the first recorded Texas Speaker vote since 1976. Late in the campaign, the Houston Chronicle reported that Turner tried to attract the support of Democrats in order to save his campaign, but the Democrats and the overwhelming majority of Republicans stuck with Straus. Despite considerable attention from Tea Party movement groups and the media, Turner received only 19 votes to Straus' 128.

As speaker, Straus put an emphasis on bipartisan cooperation, compromise, and on issues such as budget transparency, education, higher education, water and transportation. The state has invested more money in building up emerging universities, such as the University of Texas at San Antonio and the University of Houston. With a state budget shortfall looming in 2010 and many beginning to call for higher taxes, Straus publicly called on the House to balance its budget without a tax increase, and the House followed his lead.

Straus has led the effort to make the state budget more transparent. In July 2012, he called on the House Appropriations Committee to begin reducing the amount of money that had collected in General Revenue-Dedicated balances – an accounting technique that legislators and governors increasingly used over 20 years to get the budget certified. In the 2013 legislative session, the Legislature reduced the amount of money sitting in those accounts by $1 billion. Early in the 2015 session, House leaders pledged to reduce those amounts even further.

Perhaps Straus' greatest accomplishment was leading the House, along with Chairman Allan Ritter, to make a historic investment in the state's water needs in 2013. The legislature approved, and then-Governor Rick Perry signed, legislation that created a revolving loan fund to pay for water supply and conservation projects around the state. The plan aimed to provide start-up money to communities that often struggled to get it for needed water projects. Straus led the public campaign to approve funding for the water plan, which 73 percent of Texas voters supported in November 2013.

Straus announced his opposition to President Donald Trump's travel ban against seven predominantly Muslim nations, saying "I am concerned about sending the incorrect message that we are at war with any religion." Joining Straus in this position was another Texas Republican, U.S. Representative Will Hurd of Texas's 23rd congressional district.

Straus was unanimously voted in as speaker. The last speaker to have been elected speaker for an equal amount of terms was Pete Laney of Plainview.

Straus has declined to support the anti-transgender bathroom bill (SB 6), which was introduced by Republican state Senator Lois Kolkhorst of Brenham and endorsed by Lieutenant Governor Dan Patrick. Straus said the measure was not a priority for him. Straus's decision not to support the bill was attacked by Jared Woodfill, the former Harris County Republican chairman and editor-in-chief of the newsletter of the group Conservative Republicans of Texas, and associated activists. They criticized Straus for not moving the bill forward, and called upon Christian right candidates to launch Republican primary election challenges against Republican state legislators who did not support it. The bill was raised again in July 2017, after Republican Governor Abbott called a special legislative session. In July 2017, the Bexar County Republican Executive Committee passed a "no confidence" resolution calling upon Straus to step down as speaker for blocking the consideration of conservative bills pending in the upcoming special session, including the lingering bathroom bill.

Straus said that he supported decisions being made at the local level, rather than the imposition of top-down guidelines from the state, and on August 15, 2017, Straus adjourned a special session of the Texas House early, without permitting a vote on the bill restricting transgender bathroom access, leading Patrick to attack Straus. Straus's position was supported by columnist Josh Brodesky of the San Antonio Express-News, Straus's hometown newspaper and by a group of San Antonio businesspeople, who urged Straus in a letter, to continue to block passage of the bathroom bill, writing that it "diverts much needed attention from what really matters."

Patrick also opposed a school finance bill supported by Straus, fearing that the costs could lead to a state income tax to meet the extra obligations. Patrick's plan called for pay hikes for educators and retirees and relief to the more prosperous school districts which must send some local funds to Austin to help pay for the overall public education system.

In October 2017, Straus announced that he would not seek re-election in 2018.

== Reception ==
Straus was described by the New York Times in 2009 as a centrist fiscal conservative and "country club Republican" who was telegenic and urbane from the upscale suburb of Alamo Heights.

Straus has received numerous awards and accolades. In 2013, Texas Monthly named him one of the "Ten Best Legislators". And in endorsing him for re-election in 2014, the San Antonio Express-News wrote, "Under Straus' leadership, the House has produced conservative budgets and a broad conservative agenda. Straus has done an admirable job managing the House since 2009, and he provides crucial leadership on important San Antonio issues. His constituents benefit significantly by having the speaker represent their district."

In October 2017, Straus announced that he would not run for re-election. The New York Times described Straus as a pragmatist. He "delivered a plea that Republicans 'appeal to our diverse population with an optimistic vision'" when he announced he would not be running again. Shortly after the 2018 midterm elections, Straus criticized Texas lieutenant governor Dan Patrick and other Republicans for adopting positions too far to the right, though Patrick responded by questioning Straus's status as a conservative and a Republican.

In 2010, e-mails circulated among members of the Texas State Republican Executive Committee calling for Straus to be replaced by a "Christian conservative" as speaker, on the grounds that "we elected a house with Christian, conservative values. We now want a true Christian, conservative running it." Straus's opponents for the speakership, Ken Paxton (later the Attorney General of Texas) and Warren Chisum, are Christians; both condemned the comments. John Cook, author of some of the e-mails, said that, "When I got involved in politics, I told people I wanted to put Christian conservatives in leadership positions" but denied allegations of antisemitism.

== After leaving the state House ==
In mid-2019, Straus established a new political action committee, Texas Forever Forward, saying it would "promote a thoughtful, conservative approach to governing"; Straus is chairman of the PAC, and Wallace B. Jefferson, a former chief justice of the Texas Supreme Court, is the treasurer.

In 2020, Straus wrote an op-ed for the San Antonio Express-News expressing support for Medicaid expansion, writing that this would bolster the economy and businesses.

During the 2020 presidential election, Straus was one of a number of Republicans to oppose a lawsuit by conservative activists seeking to invalidate 127,000 votes cast in Harris County, Texas (the state's most populous county) through drive-through sites established by local elections officials amid the COVID-19 pandemic. Straus jointed with prominent Texas Republican elections lawyer Ben Ginsberg to file an amicus brief opposing the plaintiffs' claims; in a statement, Straus called the effort to invalidate votes "patently wrong" and that "the Republican Party needs to return to a place where we win with ideas and persuasion rather than trying to intimidate and silence our fellow citizens."

== Personal ==
Straus is Jewish. He is a lifelong member of Temple Beth El, a Reform synagogue in San Antonio, where his grandfather served as the synagogue's president. Straus rarely spoke of his faith, describing it as a "personal thing" for him and his family.

His wife Julie Brink Straus was on the board of Planned Parenthood in the early 1990s.

Texas House of Representatives
Preceded by Elizabeth Ames Jones	Member of the Texas House of Representatives from the 121st district 2005–2019	Succeeded by Steve Allison
Political offices
Preceded by Tom Craddick	Speaker of the Texas House of Representatives; 2009–2019	Succeeded by Dennis Bonnen
