= Gary Elkins (politician) =

American politician (1955–2025)

Gary Wayne Elkins

Member of the Texas House of Representatives from the 135th district
- In office January 10, 1995 – January 8, 2019
- Preceded by: Dalton Smith
- Succeeded by: Jon Rosenthal

Personal details
- Born: March 15, 1955 Houston, Texas, U.S.
- Died: November 26, 2025 (aged 70) Houston, Texas, U.S.
- Party: Republican
- Spouse: Julie Ann Brown Elkins
- Children: 4
- Education: Southwestern Assemblies of God University (BS)
- Occupation: Businessman

Gary Wayne Elkins (March 15, 1955 - November 26, 2025) was an American businessman and politician who was a Republican member of the Texas House of Representatives. From 1995, with the advent of the George W. Bush gubernatorial administration, until 2019, Elkins represented District 135 in Harris County.

Elkins won his eleventh term in the state House in the general election held on November 4, 2014, when he defeated Democrat Moiz A. Abbas of Houston. He won his twelfth term on November 8, 2016, with 26,685 votes (47.7 percent). He was unseated in his bid for a thirteenth term by Democrat Jon Rosenthal, who polled 28,430 votes (50.8 percent). Another 866 votes (1.5 percent) went to the Libertarian Party candidate, Paul Bilyeu.

Elkins died on November 26, 2025 in Houston, Texas, at the age of 70.

== Background ==
Elkins graduated in 1974 from Bellaire High School in the Bellaire section of Houston. He subsequently earned a Bachelor of Science in Practical Theology from the private Southwestern Assemblies of God University in Waxachachie in Ellis County in the Dallas-Fort Worth metroplex. He has worked in real estate and since 1985 has owned Personal Credit Corporation, which operates a dozen payday-lending locations in Houston. He is a long-term legislative opponent of attempts to regulate his own industry.

Elkins and his wife, the former Julie Ann Brown, have four children, Crystal Boyd, Jeremy Ross Elkins, and Grace and Rachael Elkins, and as of 2014, four grandchildren. The couple resides in the Jersey Village section of Houston. He is a member of the Faith Assembly of God Church in Houston.

== Election to twelfth term, 2016 ==
Elkins won his twelfth term in the state House in the general election held on November 8, 2016. With 32,682 votes (54.9 percent), he defeated Democrat Jesse A. Ybanez, who drew 26,905 (45.2 percent).

In 2017, Representative Elkins introduced HB 3418, which would make it more difficult for local governments to designate historic landmarks. According to the historic preservation group, Preservation Texas, Inc., the legislation would make it easier for the owners of previously-designated landmarks to uproot those facilities. It would limit public input in the zoning process and impede local governments in the passage of zoning regulations. Texas municipalities have long depended on zoning ordinances as well as historic resource surveys, and tax incentives to assist in the preservation of historic landmarks. The bill is pending before the House Urban Affairs Committee.

== In popular culture ==
One of Elkins's attempts to defeat payday loan industry regulation, in which fellow Representative Vicki Truitt pointed out his conflict of interest in being opposed to it while owning several payday loans himself, was featured in an episode 14, season 1, Last Week Tonight with John Oliver segment on payday loans.

Political offices
Texas House of Representatives
Preceded by Dalton Smith	Texas State Representative for District 135 (Houston); 1995–2019	Succeeded by Jon Rosenthal
