= Texas Alliance of Energy Producers =

Petroleum trade association in Texas

- Formation: 2000
- Type: Trade association
- Headquarters: Austin, Texas, United States
- Members: Nearly 3,000 individuals and member companies
- Key people: Chairman: Jason Herrick; Past Chairman: Houston Sullivan; Interim President: Karr Ingham; Past President: Jason Modglin

The Texas Alliance of Energy Producers ("TAEP") is a trade association based in Austin, Texas. It advocates for members of the petroleum industry in the United States. In particular, TAEP focuses on small independent producers and their unique needs in the global energy landscape. It represents nearly 3,000 individuals and member companies.

== History ==
Created in 2000 through the merger of the North Texas Oil & Gas Association and the West Central Texas Oil & Gas Association, TAEP has a combined membership of over 3,000 members. TAEP brings together members in 300 cities and 29 states for the common purpose of advocating for the oil and gas industry.

== Texas Petro Index ==
The group is known for creating the Texas Petro Index, a tool that measures the state of the oil economy. The index considers factors such as rig count, employment within the petroleum industry, petroleum prices, and production levels.

== Produced Water White Paper ==
The White Paper provides facts and analysis that can be used by decision-makers, legislators, and voters. The paper highlights produced water management trends, provides examples of recycling and reuse, explores the evolving regulatory and policy framework in Texas, and provides a fact-based analysis of the impediments to improving produced water management.

== Key personnel ==
Jason Herrick is the current Chairman of the Board of Texas Alliance of Energy Producers. Mr. Herrick is the current president of Pantera Energy Company, a family owned independent oil and gas producer based in Amarillo, Texas.

Houston Sullivan is Past chairman of the Board. Mr. Sullivan is currently the Co-Chief Executive Officer of Veritas, Energy, LLC. Before rejoining Veritas he was Senior Vice President of Business Development of Double Eagle Energy Holdings III LLC and Double Eagle Energy Permian, LLC, a merger between Veritas Energy, LLC and Double Eagle Energy Holdings II. Through these various roles, he has been actively involved in building companies focused on the core of the Midland Basin.

Cye Wagner of Cooper Oil and Gas is the past Chairman of the TAEP board. Cye has served as the Board Chairman for the past two years. Wagner has worked for over 10 years with Cooper Oil & Gas, Inc.

Past presidents include Jason Modglin (2020-2023) and John Tintera (2018-2020).

== Past Chairman ==
TAEP Past Chairman
Houston Sullivan	2022-2024	Tom Medders, Jr	1963-1965
Cye Wagner	2020-2022	Jerry Vinson	1962
James Beck	2018-2020	Netum A. Steed	1960-1962
Robert Osborne	2016-2018	Marvin L. McCullough	1958-60 / 1962-63
George Rogers	2014-2016	R. O. Harvey, Jr.	1957-1958
Townes Pressler	2012-2014	Wayne O. Watts	1956-1957
Tommy Taylor	2010-2012	D. C. Norwood	1954-1956
Mark Metzler	2008-2010	E. B. Clark	1953-1954
Frank King	2006-2008	Marvin E. McCullough	1951-1953
Hollis Sullivan	2004-2006	Clay Underwood	1949-1951
Roy Pitcock, Jr	2002-2004	George Dimock	1948-1949
Michael K. Elyea	1998-2000	J. H. S. Bonner	1947-1948
Bill Setzler	1996-1998	J. P. Coleman	1946-1947
Don Hupp	1994-1996	Edward Kadane	1945-1946
Larry Hulsey	1992-1994	John Thomas	1944-1945
Gary Shores	1990-1992	J. A. McCarty	1942-1944
Tom Darling	1988-1990	C. J. Tucker	1941-1942
Robert K. Pace	1986-1988	D. H. Bolin	1940-1941
Ed S. Spragins	1984-1986	John F. O’Donohoe	1939-1940
John Bennett	1982-1984	P. F. Gwynn	1938-1939
George Kadane	1980-1982	R. L. Underwood	1937-1938
Robert E. Vinson	1978-1980	R. A. King	1936-1937
R. W. McBride	1976-1978	L. H. Cullum	1935-1936
Joseph McMahon	1974-1976	Charles McGaha	1934-1935
Richard Darner	1972-1974	J. S. Bridwell	1933-1934
W. M. Thacker, Jr.	1970-1972	Merrill W. Blair	1932-1933
David Kimbell, Sr.	1968-1970	T. F. Hunter	1931-1932
George Graham	1965-1968	P. B. Flynn	1930-1931
