= Texas's 121st House of Representatives district =

American legislative district

Texas's 121st State House of Representatives district
Representative
Marc LaHood; R–San Antonio
- Demographics: 48.3% White; 8.1% Black; 36.4% Hispanic; 6.8% Asian
- Population (2020) • Voting age: 203,209; 155,904

The 121st district of the Texas House of Representatives contains parts of northern Bexar County. The current representative is Marc LaHood, who was first elected in 2024.

In the 2026 Texas House of Representatives election, Zack Dunn defeated LaHood to become the new Representative-elect. Dunn's victory marked a flip of the district for the Democratic Party.
