= Railroad Commission of Texas =

State energy regulatory agency

Coordinates: 30.279064°N 97.738270°W

- Railroad Commission of Texas

Agency overview
- Formed: 1891
- Jurisdiction: Texas
- Headquarters: Austin, Texas
- Employees: 835
- Agency executives: Wayne Christian, Commissioner; Christi Craddick, Commissioner; Jim Wright, Chairman
- Website: www.rrc.texas.gov

The Railroad Commission of Texas (RRC), also known as the Texas Railroad Commission (TRC), is the agency that regulates the oil and gas industry, gas utilities, pipeline safety, safety in the liquefied petroleum gas industry, and surface coal and uranium mining in the U.S. state of Texas. Despite its name, it ceased regulating railroads in 2005, when the last of the rail functions were transferred to the Texas Department of Transportation.

Established by the Texas Legislature in 1891, it is the state's oldest regulatory agency, and it began as part of the Efficiency Movement of the Progressive Era. From the 1930s to the 1960s, it largely set world oil prices, but was displaced by OPEC (Organization of Petroleum Exporting Countries) after 1973. In 1984, the federal government took over transportation regulation for railroads, trucking, and buses, but the Railroad Commission kept its name. With an annual budget of $79 million, it now focuses entirely on oil, gas, mining, propane, and pipelines, setting allocations for production each month.

The three-member commission was initially appointed by the governor, but an amendment to the state's constitution in 1894 established the commissioners as elected officials who serve overlapping six-year terms, like the sequence in the U.S. Senate, elected statewide. No specific seat is designated as chairman; the commissioners choose the chairman from among themselves. Normally, the commissioner who faces reelection is the chairman for the preceding two years. The current commissioners are: Jim Wright since January 4, 2021; Wayne Christian since January 9, 2017; and Christi Craddick since December 17, 2012.

== History ==
Attempts to establish a railroad commission in Texas began in 1876. After five legislative failures, an amendment to the state constitution that provided for a railroad commission was submitted to voters in 1890. The amendment's ratification and the 1890 election of Governor James S. Hogg, a Democrat, permitted the legislature in 1891 to pass legislation that constitutionally created the Railroad Commission of Texas, and gave it jurisdiction over the operations of railroads, terminals, wharves, and express companies. It could set rates, issue rules on how to classify freight, require adequate railroad reports, and prohibit and punish discrimination and extortion by corporations. George Clark, running as an independent "Jeffersonian Democratic" candidate for governor in 1892, denounced the TRC as being "Wrong in principle, undemocratic, and unrepublican." Clark opined that the TRC and similar "Commissions do no good. They do harm. Their only function is to harass. I regard it as essentially foolish and essentially vicious." Clark lost the 1892 election to Hogg, but federal judge Andrew Phelps McCormick granted an injunction preventing the TRC from enforcing compliance and seeking to prosecute or recover penalties from railroad companies the same year; the decision was overruled by the United States Supreme Court in 1894. The governor appointed the first members; the first elections to the commission were held in 1893, with three commissioners serving six-year, overlapping terms. The TRC did not have jurisdiction over interstate rates, but Texas was so large that the in-state traffic it regulated was of dominant importance.

The agency did not have the legal authority to set rates, nor did it have the resources to spend much of its time in court battles. Freight rates continued to decline dramatically. In 1891, a typical rate was 1.403 cents per ton mile. By 1907, the rate was 1.039 cents—a decline of 25%. However, the railroads did not have rates high enough for them to upgrade their equipment and lower costs in the face of competition from pipelines along with cars and trucks, the infrastructure of which operated at a loss, and the Texas railway system began a slow decline.

Texas was the first state to attempt to valuate its railroads. In 1893, 15,000 dollars were allotted to the appraisal process of Texas rail over the course of 2 years. By 1895 the appraised infrastructure was valued at $93,785,159 by the two civil engineers hired to undertake the task.

=== Segregation ===
From the 1890s through the 1960s, the Texas Railroad Commission found it difficult to fully enforce Jim Crow segregation legislation. Because of the expense involved, Texas railroads often allowed wealthier blacks to mix with whites, rather than provide separate cars, dining facilities, and even depots. In addition, West Texas authorities often refused to enforce Jim Crow laws because few African Americans resided there. In the 1940s, the railroad commission's enforcement of segregation laws began collapsing further, in part because of the great number of African American soldiers that were transported during World War II. The trains were integrated in the early 1960s.

=== Expansion to oil ===
The agency's reach expanded as it took over responsibility for regulating oil pipelines (in 1917), oil and gas production (1919), natural gas delivery systems (1920), bus lines (1927), and trucking (1929). It grew from 12 employees in 1916 to 69 in 1930 and 566 in 1939. It does not have jurisdiction over investor-owned electric utility companies; that falls under the jurisdiction of the Public Utility Commission of Texas.

A crisis for the petroleum industry was created by the East Texas oil boom of the 1930s, as prices plunged to 25¢ a barrel. The traditional TRC policy of negotiating compromises failed; the governor was forced to call in the state militia to enforce order. Texas oilmen decided they preferred state to federal regulation, and wanted the TRC to give out quotas so that every producer would get higher prices and profits. Pure Oil Company opposed the first statewide oil prorationing order, which was issued by the TRC in August 1930. The order, which was intended to conserve oil resources by limiting the number of barrels drilled per day, was seen by small producers, like Pure Oil, as a conspiracy between government and major companies to drive them out of business, and ultimately foster monopoly in the oil industry.

Ernest O. Thompson (1892–1966), head of the TRC from 1932 to 1965, took charge of the agency, and indeed the oil industry, by appealing to an ideal of Texas's role in the global oil order—the civil religion of Texas oil. He cajoled, harangued, and browbeat recalcitrant producers into compliance with the TRC's pro-rationing orders. The New Deal allowed the TRC to set national oil policy. As late as the 1950s, the TRC controlled over 40% of United States' crude production, and approximately half of estimated national proved reserves. It served as a model in the creation of OPEC. Gordon M. Griffin, chief engineer of the TRC during World War II, developed the formula for prorationing to keep production flowing for the military.

Over time more the TRC was allocated regulatory control over more extractive industries such as surface mining and compressed natural gas. Simultaneously the various rail regulatory powers were allocated to other agencies. In 1984, the federal government assumed regulatory control over all railroads. The responsibility of valuations were also transferred, county appraisal districts now handle property railroad property reporting.

Effective October 1, 2005, as a result of House Bill 2702, the remaining rail oversight functions of the Railroad Commission were transferred to the Texas Department of Transportation. The traditional name of the commission was not changed despite the loss of its titular regulatory duties. There have been multiple attempts to update the name, but as of 2026 none have been successful.

== Hearings ==
From 1932 to 1972 a series of hearings were conducted by the Rail Road Commission of Texas. These hearings petitioned individuals such as legal examiners and engineers for the purpose of creating various rules and efficiency expectations for the proliferation of infrastructure with the purpose of "conservation and prevention of waste of crude petroleum and natural gas" as ordered by the organization.

Modern hearings are open to the public and discuss topics like pipeline safety, alternative fuel safety and various other matters under the commissions purview. In 2026, the Commission updated its policies restricting public comments during these hearings.

== Operations ==
Regulation was a practical rather than ideological affair. The TRC typically worked with the regulated industries to improve operations, share best practices, and address consumer complaints. Radical activities—like heated court battles or rate-setting to favor shippers, producers, or consumers—were the exception rather than the rule.

Within the oil and gas industry, it took into account production in other states, in effect bringing total available supply (including imports, which were small) within the principle of prorationing to market demand. Allowable oilfield production was calculated as follows: estimated market demand, minus uncontrolled additions to supply, gave the Texas total; this was then prorated among fields and wells in a manner calculated to preserve equity among producers, and to prevent any well from producing beyond its maximum efficient rate (MER). Scheduled allowables are expressed in numbers of calendar days of permitted production per month at MER. In the spring of 2013, new hydraulic fracturing water recycling rules were adopted in the state of Texas by the Railroad Commission of Texas. The Water Recycling Rules are intended to encourage Texas hydraulic fracturing operators to conserve water used in the hydraulic fracturing process for oil and gas wells.

== Court cases involving the commission ==
The Shreveport Rate Case, also known as Houston E. & W. Ry. Co. v. United States, 234 U.S. 342 (1914) arose from the Railroad Commission's setting railroad freight rates unequally. Because of the low intrastate rates, shippers in eastern Texas tended to ship their wares to Dallas (in Texas), rather than to Shreveport, Louisiana, although Shreveport was considerably closer to much of eastern Texas. The Railroad Commission's (and the railroad's) position was that only the state could regulate commerce within a state, and that the federal government had no power so to do. The Supreme Court ruled that the federal government's ability to regulate interstate commerce necessarily included the ability to regulate intrastate "operations in all matters having a close and substantial relation to interstate traffic," and to ensure that "interstate commerce may be conducted upon fair terms."

The Railroad Commission has also figured prominently in two major U.S. Supreme Court cases on the doctrine of abstention:

- Railroad Commission v. Pullman Co., a 1941 case in which the U.S. Supreme Court ruled that it was appropriate for federal courts to abstain from hearing a case to allow state courts to decide substantial constitutional issues that touch upon sensitive areas of state social policy, specifically the race of railroad employees.
- Burford v. Sun Oil Co., a 1943 case in which the U.S. Supreme Court ruled that a federal court sitting in diversity jurisdiction may abstain from hearing the case where the state courts likely have greater expertise in a particularly complex and unclear area of state law which is of special significance to the state, where there is comprehensive state administrative/regulatory procedure, and where the federal issues cannot be decided without delving into state law.

== Commissioners ==
The commissioners are elected in statewide partisan elections for six-year terms, with one commission seat up for election every two years. The commission selects a chairperson from among their members every year.

Name	Party	Start	Term end
Wayne Christian	Republican	January 3, 2017	2028
Christi Craddick, Chair	Republican	December 12, 2012	2030
Jim Wright	Republican	January 4, 2021	January 3, 2027 (primaried)

=== Members of the first Railroad Commission of Texas ===
John H. Reagan (1818–1903), the first chairman of the TRC (1891–1903), had been the most outspoken advocate in Congress of bills to regulate railroads in the 1880s. He feared the corruption caused by railroad monopolies, and considered their control a moral challenge. As chairman of the TRC, Reagan changed his views when he became acquainted with the realities of the complex forces affecting railroad management. Reagan turned to the Efficiency Movement for ideas, and established a pattern of regulatory practice that the TRC used for decades. He believed that the agency should pursue two main goals: to protect consumers from unfair railway practices and excessive rates, and to support the state's overall economic growth. To find the optimal rates that met these goals, he focused the TRC on the collection of data, direct negotiation with railway executives, and compromises with the parties involved.

Lafayette L. Foster (1851–1901) was a commissioner of the first TRC (1891–1895) appointed by Governor Hogg. He resigned in 1895, and became the vice president and general manager of the Velasco Terminal Railway. He was succeeded as commissioner by Nathan Alexander Stedman.

William P. McLean (1836–1925) was a commissioner of the first TRC (1891–1894) appointed by Governor Hogg. He was a judge before his appointment to the commission. He was re-elected in 1893, but resigned his position in 1894 to practice law in Fort Worth. He was succeeded as commissioner by Leonidas Jefferson Storey, who later became chairman of the TRC in 1903, following Reagan's death.

== Offices and districts ==
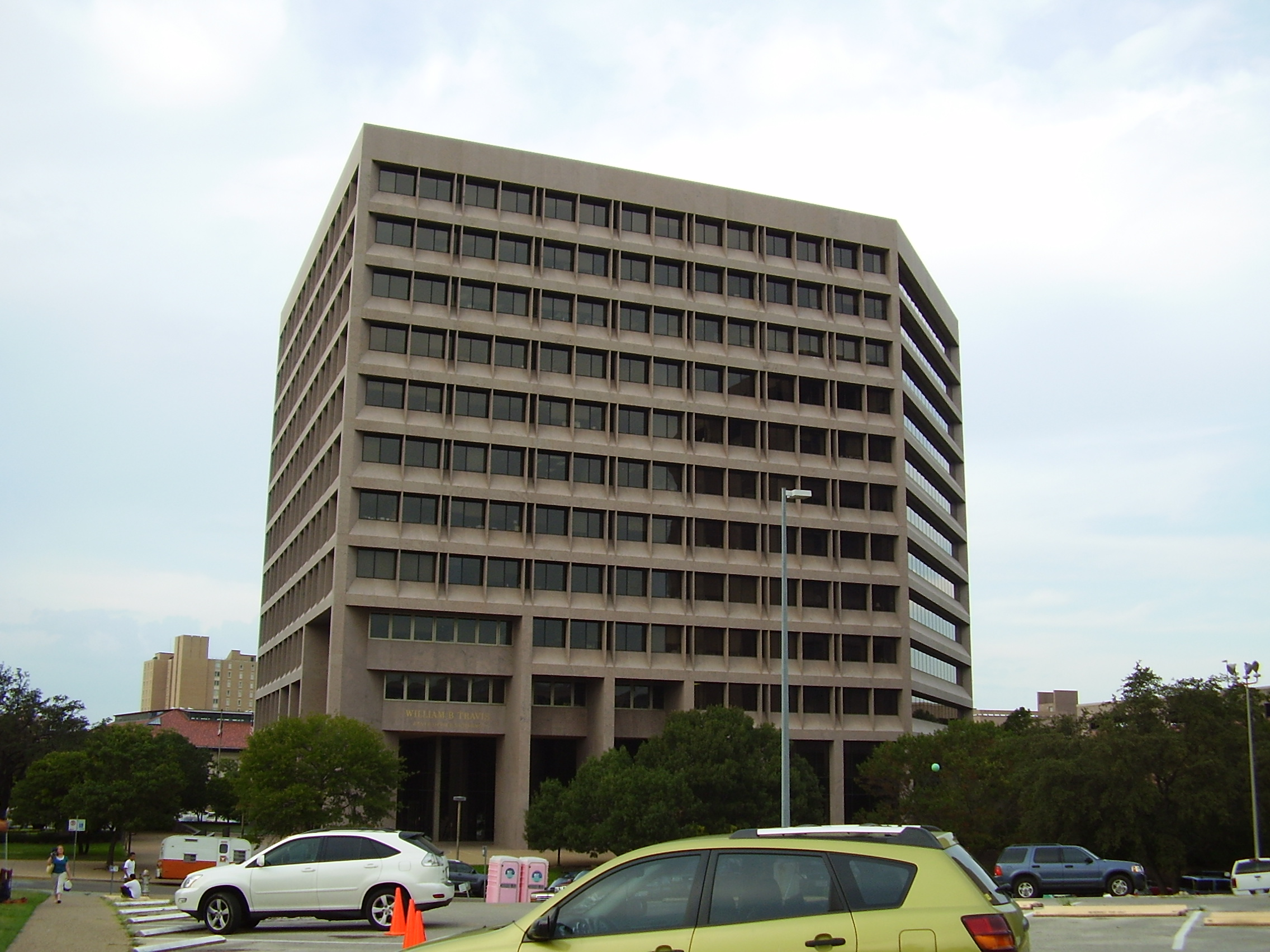
The main offices of the Railroad Commission of Texas are located in the William B. Travis State Office Building.

The agency is headquartered in the William B. Travis State Office Building at 1701 North Congress Avenue in Austin. In addition, the Texas Railroad Commission has twelve oil and gas district offices located throughout the state. The district offices facilitate communication between industry representatives and the commission.

Because the TRC needed access to the Texas headquarters of the various oil companies, it maintained long-term offices at San Antonio's Milam Building.

Name	Office	Region
District 1	San Antonio	Texas Hill Country
District 2	San Antonio	Greater Golden Crescent Region
District 3	Houston	Southeast Texas + Greater Houston
District 4	Corpus Christi	South Texas south of Refugio County
District 5	Kilgore	west half of Northeast Texas
District 6	Kilgore	east half of Northeast Texas
District 7B	Abilene	West Central Texas
District 7C	San Angelo	Concho Valley
District 8	Midland	Trans-Pecos + Midland and surrounding counties
District 8A	Lubbock	South Plains
District 9	Wichita Falls	Northern Dallas–Fort Worth metroplex and North
District 10	Pampa	Texas Panhandle

== See also ==
- Oil and gas law in the United States
- History of Texas

== Bibliography ==
- Childs, William R. The Texas Railroad Commission: Understanding Regulation in America to the Mid-Twentieth Century. (2005). 323 pp. the standard history; online review
- Childs, William R. "Origins of the Texas Railroad Commission's Power to Control Production of Petroleum: Regulatory Strategies in the 1920s." Journal of Policy History 1990 2(4): 353–387. ISSN 0898-0306
- De Chazeau, Melvin G., and Alfred E. Kahn. Integration and Competition in the Petroleum Industry (1959) online edition
- Green, George N. "Thompson, Ernest Othmer," The Handbook of Texas Online (2008)
- Norvell, James R. "The Railroad Commission of Texas: its Origin and History." Southwestern Historical Quarterly 1965 68(4): 465–480. ISSN 0038-478X online edition
- Prindle, David F. Petroleum Politics and the Texas Railroad Commission. (1981). 230 pp., focuses on relations with independent oilmen
- David F. Prindle, "Railroad Commission," Handbook of Texas Online (2008)
- Procter, Ben H. Not Without Honor: The Life of John H. Reagan (1962).
- Procter, Ben H. Reagan, John Henninger, Handbook of Texas Online (2008)
- Splawn, W. M. W. "Valuation and Rate Regulation by the Railroad Commission of Texas," Journal of Political Economy Vol. 31, No. 5 (Oct., 1923), pp. 675–707 in JSTOR
