= 2006 Texas elections =

- November 7, 2006

Elections were held in Texas on Tuesday, November 7, 2006. Voters statewide elected the Governor, Lieutenant Governor, Attorney General, Comptroller of Public Accounts, Commissioner of the Texas General Land Office, Commissioner of Agriculture, and one Railroad Commissioner. Statewide judicial offices up for election were the chief justice and four justices of the Texas Supreme Court, and the presiding judge and two judges of the Texas Court of Criminal Appeals.

Elections were additionally held for the United States Senate, U.S. House of Representatives, Texas Senate, and Texas House.

Democratic and Republican candidates were selected in party primaries held 7 March 2006. In races without a majority, the runoff elections were held on 11 April 2006.

Libertarian candidates were selected at the Texas Libertarian Convention 10 June 2006 in Houston (the Libertarian Party does not use a primary system to select candidates).

Independent candidates had 60 days after the primaries are over (from 8 March, one day after the primary election, to 11 May 2006) to collect the necessary signatures to secure a place on the ballot. For statewide elections, state law proscribes the collection of one percent of voters casting ballots in the prior gubernatorial election (for 2006, this equates to 45,540 signatures) from registered voters that did not vote in either primary or any runoffs. If there was a primary runoff for the office an independent candidate is seeking, the petition process shrank to only 30 days, from 12 April (one day after the runoff elections) to 11 May 2006.

== United States Senator ==
2006 United States Senate election, Texas
Party	Candidate	Votes	%	±%
Republican	Kay Bailey Hutchison (inc.)	2,661,789	61.7	−3.3
Democratic	Barbara Ann Radnofsky	1,555,202	36.0	+3.6
Libertarian	Scott Jameson	97,672	2.3	+1.1
Majority		1,106,587	25.7	
Turnout		4,314,663		
Republican hold		Swing		

== Governor ==
Texas general election, 2006: Governor
Party	Candidate	Votes	%	±%
Republican	Rick Perry (incumbent)	1,716,803	39.03	−18.78
Democratic	Chris Bell	1,310,353	29.79	−10.17
Independent	Carole Keeton Strayhorn	797,577	18.13	
Independent	Richard "Kinky" Friedman	546,869	12.43	
Libertarian	James Werner	26,748	0.61	−0.86
Write-in	James "Patriot" Dillon	718	0.02	
Majority		406,450	9.24	
Turnout		4,399,068		−3.40
Republican hold				

== Lieutenant governor ==
2006 election for Lieutenant Governor
Party	Candidate	Votes	%	±%
Republican	David Dewhurst (inc.)	2,513,530	58.19	
Democratic	Maria Luisa Alvarado	1,617,490	37.44	
Libertarian	Judy Baker	188,206	4.35	
Majority		896,040	20.75	
Turnout		4,319,226		
Republican hold		Swing		

== Attorney general ==
Incumbent Attorney general Greg Abbott ran for re-election, winning by a 22% margin.

2006 election for Attorney General
Party	Candidate	Votes	%	±%
Republican	Greg Abbott (inc.)	2,556,063	59.51	
Democratic	David Van Os	1,599,069	37.23	
Libertarian	Jon Roland	139,668	3.25	
Majority		956,994	22.28	
Turnout		4,294,800		
Republican hold		Swing		

== Comptroller of Public Accounts ==
2006 Texas Comptroller of Public Accounts election
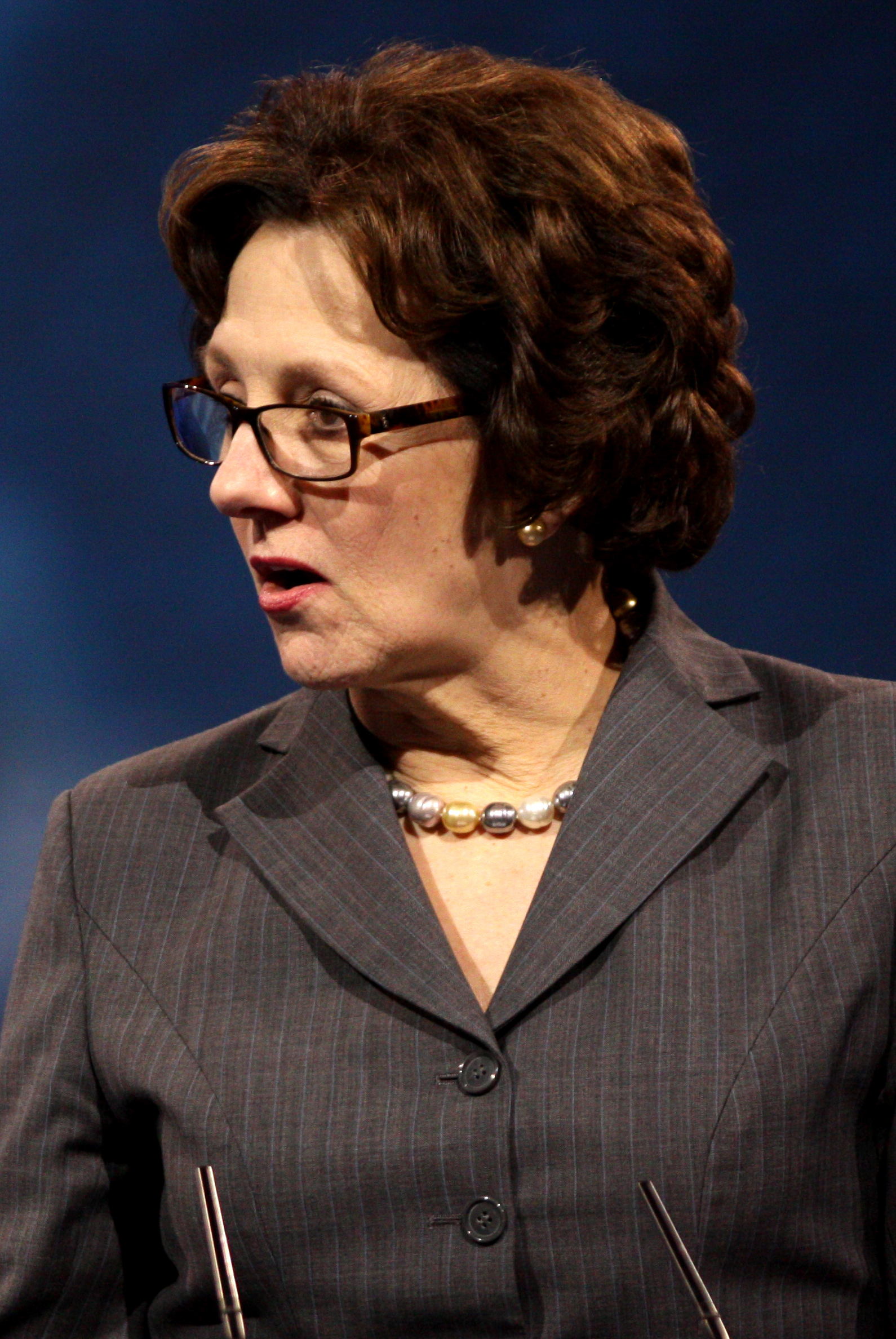

Nominee	Susan Combs	Fred Head
Party	Republican	Democratic
Popular vote	2,547,323	1,585,362
Percentage	59.47%	37.01%
- County results Combs: 40–50% 50–60% 60–70% 70–80% 80–90% Head: 40–50% 50–60% 60–70% 70–80% 80–90%
Comptroller before election
Carole Keeton Strayhorn
Republican
Elected Comptroller
Susan Combs
Republican

2006 election for Comptroller of Public Accounts
Party	Candidate	Votes	%	±%
Republican	Susan Combs	2,547,323	59.47	
Democratic	Fred Head	1,585,362	37.01	
Libertarian	Mike Burris	150,565	3.51	
Majority		961,961	22.46	
Turnout		4,283,250		
Republican hold		Swing		

== Commissioner of the General Land Office ==
2006 election for Commissioner of the General Land Office
Party	Candidate	Votes	%	±%
Republican	Jerry E. Patterson (inc.)	2,317,554	55.13	
Democratic	VaLinda Hathcox	1,721,964	40.96	
Libertarian	Michael A. French	164,098	3.90	
Majority		595,590	14.17	
Turnout		4,203,616		
Republican hold		Swing		

Results by county Patterson: 40–50%; 50–60%; 60–70%; 70–80%; 80–90%; Hathcox: 40–50%; 50–60%; 60–70%; 70–80%; 80–90%

== Commissioner of Agriculture ==
2006 Texas Agriculture Commissioner election
Nominee	Todd Staples	Hank Gilbert
Party	Republican	Democratic
Popular vote	2,307,406	1,760,402
Percentage	54.8%	41.8%
- County results Staples: 40–50% 50–60% 60–70% 70–80% 80–90% Gilbert: 40–50% 50–60% 60–70% 70–80% 80–90%
Agriculture Commissioner before election
Todd Staples
Republican
Elected Agriculture Commissioner
Todd Staples
Republican

Texas general election, 2006: Texas Commissioner of Agriculture
Party	Candidate	Votes	%	±%
Republican	Todd Staples	2,307,406	54.77	−4.77
Democratic	Hank Gilbert	1,760,402	41.79	+3.97
Libertarian	Clay Woolam	144,989	3.44	+2.26
Majority		547,004	12.98	−8.74
Turnout		4,212,797		−4.85
Republican hold				

== Railroad Commissioner ==
2006 Texas Railroad Commissioner election
- November 7, 2006
Nominee	Elizabeth Ames Jones	Dale Henry
Party	Republican	Democratic
Popular vote	2,269,743	1,752,947
Percentage	54.03%	41.73%
Results by county
Jones:
40–50%
50–60%
60–70%
70–80%
80–90%
Henry:
40–50%
50–60%
60–70%
70–80%
80–90%
Railroad Commissioner before election
Elizabeth Ames Jones
Republican
Elected Railroad Commissioner
Elizabeth Ames Jones
Republican

2006 election for Railroad Commissioner
Party	Candidate	Votes	%	±%
Republican	Elizabeth Ames Jones (inc.)	2,269,743	54.03	
Democratic	Dale Henry	1,752,947	41.73	
Libertarian	Tabitha Serrano	177,648	4.22	
Majority		516,796	12.3	
Turnout		4,200,338		
Republican hold		Swing		

== Texas Supreme Court ==
=== Chief Justice, Unexpired term ===
Republican
Wallace Jefferson, Incumbent
Libertarian
Tom Oxford
Green (Write-in)
Charles E. Waterbury

=== Justice, Place 2 ===
Republican
Don Willett, Incumbent
Democrat
William E. Moody
Libertarian
Wade Wilson

=== Justice, Place 4 ===
Republican
David M. Medina, Incumbent
Libertarian
Jerry Adkins

=== Justice, Place 6 ===
Republican
Nathan Hecht, Incumbent
Libertarian
Todd Phillipp
Independent (declared)
Petition deadline has passed for ballot access, but may run as write-in candidate

William W. McNeal

=== Justice, Place 8, Unexpired term ===
Republican
Phil Johnson, Incumbent
Libertarian
Jay H. Cookingham

== Texas Court of Criminal Appeals ==
=== Presiding Judge ===
Republican
Sharon Keller, Incumbent
Democrat
J.R. Molina

=== Judge, Place 7 ===
Republican
Barbara Parker Hervey, Incumbent
Libertarian
Quanah Parker

=== Judge, Place 8 ===
Republican
Charles Holcomb, Incumbent
Libertarian
Dave Howard

== Legislative elections ==
Sixteen Texas Senate seats and all 150 Texas House of Representatives seats are up for election in 2006. The senators and representatives elected in 2006 served in the Eightieth Texas Legislature, while the senators also served in the Eighty-first Texas Legislature.

=== Texas Senate ===
Fifteen of the sixteen elections for the Texas Senate were contested to some extent. In the District 3 race, Robert Nichols won his Republican primary and will be unopposed in the fall election.

=== Texas House of Representatives ===
In the Texas House of Representatives, 118 of the 150 seats were contested in the November 2006 election. Thirty races will be uncontested after the primary elections on 7 March 2006; the remaining two will be determined in the primary runoffs on 11 April 2006.

== State Board of Education ==
Only contested elections are listed.

=== Member, State Board of Education, District 3 ===
Republican
Tony Cunningham
Democrat
Rick Agosto

=== Member, State Board of Education, District 5 ===
Republican
Ken Mercer
Libertarian
Bill Oliver

=== Member, State Board of Education, District 9 ===
Republican
Don McLeroy, Incumbent
Democrat
Maggie Charleton

=== Member, State Board of Education, District 10 ===
Republican
Cynthia Dunbar
Libertarian
Martin Thomen

=== Member, State Board of Education, District 12 ===
Republican
Geraldine "Tincy" Miller, Incumbent
Libertarian
Matthew Havener

=== Member, State Board of Education, District 15 ===
Republican
Bob Craig, Incumbent
Libertarian
Brandon Stacker

== Courts of Appeal District elections ==
Only contested elections are listed.

=== 1st Court of Appeals District ===
==== Place 9 ====
Republican
Elsa Alcala, Incumbent
Democrat
Jim Sharp

=== 3rd Court of Appeals District ===
==== Place 2 ====
Republican
Alan Waldrop, Incumbent
Democrat
Jim Sybert Coronado

==== Place 5 ====
Republican
David Puryear, Incumbent
Democrat
Mina A. Brees

==== Place 6 ====
Republican
Bob Pemberton, Incumbent
Democrat
Bree Buchanan

=== 4th Court of Appeals District ===
==== Place 3 ====
Republican
Rebecca Simmons, Incumbent
Democrat
Richard Garcia, Jr.

==== Place 4 ====
Republican
Steve Hilbig
Democrat
Dan Pozza

==== Place 5 ====
Republican
Karen Angelini, Incumbent
Democrat
Lauro A. Bustamante

==== Place 7 ====
Republican
Phylis Speedlin, Incumbent
Democrat
Eddie DeLaGarza

=== 6th Court of Appeals District ===
==== Place 2 ====
Republican
Bailey C. Moseley
Democrat
Ben Franks

Party	Candidate	Votes	%
Republican	Bailey C. Moseley	92,334	58.18
Democrat	Ben Franks	66,351	41.81

=== 13th Court of Appeals District ===
==== Place 2 ====
Democrat
Federico "Fred" Hinojosa, Incumbent
Republican
Rose Vela

=== 14th Court of Appeals District ===
==== Place 6 ====
Republican
Richard Edelman, Incumbent
Democrat
Leora T. Kahn

== See also ==
- United States midterm elections, 2006
  - United States congressional elections, 2006
    - United States Senate elections, 2006
    - United States House elections, 2006
  - United States gubernatorial elections, 2006
