= 2006 Texas Attorney General election =

- November 7, 2006
- Turnout: 32.8% (Note: Of registered voters.) ▼2.9%
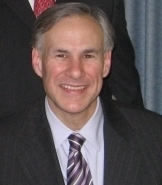

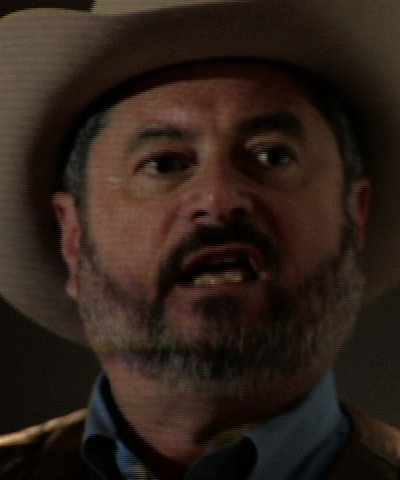
Nominee	Greg Abbott	David Van Os
Party	Republican	Democratic
Popular vote	2,556,063	1,599,069
Percentage	59.5%	37.2%
- County results Abbott: 40–50% 50–60% 60–70% 70–80% 80–90% Van Os: 40–50% 50–60% 60–70% 70–80% 80–90%
Attorney General before election
Greg Abbott
Republican
Elected Attorney General
Greg Abbott
Republican

The 2006 Texas Attorney General election took place on November 7, 2006, to elect the attorney general of Texas. Incumbent Republican attorney general Greg Abbott successfully ran for re-election and defeated Democratic attorney David Van Os with 59.51% of the vote to his second term as attorney general.

== Republican primary ==
=== Candidates ===
- Greg Abbott, incumbent

=== Results ===
Republican primary results
Party	Candidate	Votes	%
Republican	Greg Abbott	580,551	100.00
Total votes		580,551	100.0

== Democratic primary ==
=== Candidates ===
- David Van Os, attorney

=== Results ===
Republican primary results
Party	Candidate	Votes	%
Democratic	David Van Os	414,712	100.00
Total votes		414,712	100.0

== General election ==
=== Candidates ===
- Greg Abbott (R), incumbent
- David Van Os (D), attorney
- John Roland (Libertarian), author

=== Results ===
On election night Abbott won re-election in a landslide against Van Os and Roland.

General election results
Party	Candidate	Votes	%
Republican	Greg Abbott (incumbent)	2,553,610	59.50
Democratic	David Van Os	1,598,378	37.25
Libertarian	Jon Roland	139,525	3.25
Total votes		4,294,800	100.0
Turnout			32.84%
Republican hold			

== See also ==
- Texas Attorney General
