= The Texas Plan =

Suggestion to amend the US Constitution

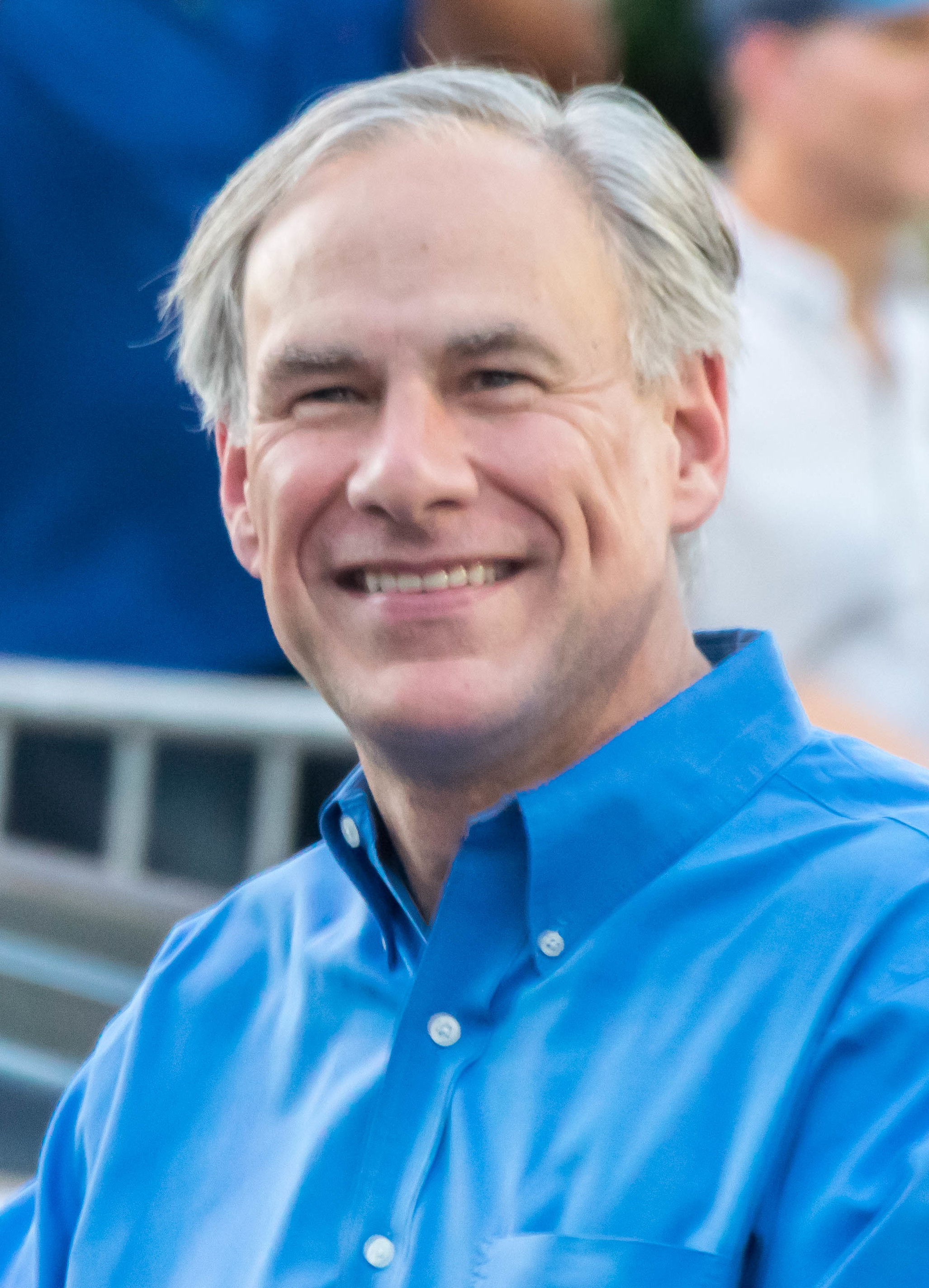
Greg Abbott, governor of Texas since 2015, proposed the Texas Plan.

The Texas Plan, also known as Restoring the Rule of Law With States Leading the Way, is a suggestion to amend the U.S. Constitution. It was written by Texas governor Greg Abbott on January 6, 2016. The Texas Plan has nine propositions to amend the U.S. Constitution. It will not be voted on until a convention of the states is held. If passed, the Texas Plan would do the following:

1. Prevent Congress from regulating activity that "occurs wholly within one State".
2. Require a balanced budget.
3. Prevent "unelected bureaucrats" from creating federal law.
4. Prevent "unelected bureaucrats" from preempting state law.
5. Let a two-thirds supermajority (currently 34) of the states override Supreme Court decisions.
6. Require a seven-justice supermajority on the Supreme Court to "invalidate a democratically enacted law".
7. "Restore the balance of power" between the federal and state governments, by limiting the federal government to "the powers expressly delegated to it in the Constitution".
8. Give state officers the right to sue in the federal courts "when federal officers overstep their bounds".
9. Let a two-thirds supermajority (currently 34) of the states nullify federal laws.

== See also ==
- Federalism in the United States
- Nullification (U.S. Constitution)
- States' rights
- Tenth Amendment to the United States Constitution
