= 2010 Texas Attorney General election =

- November 2, 2010
- Turnout: 37.1% (Note: Of registered voters.) ▲4.3%
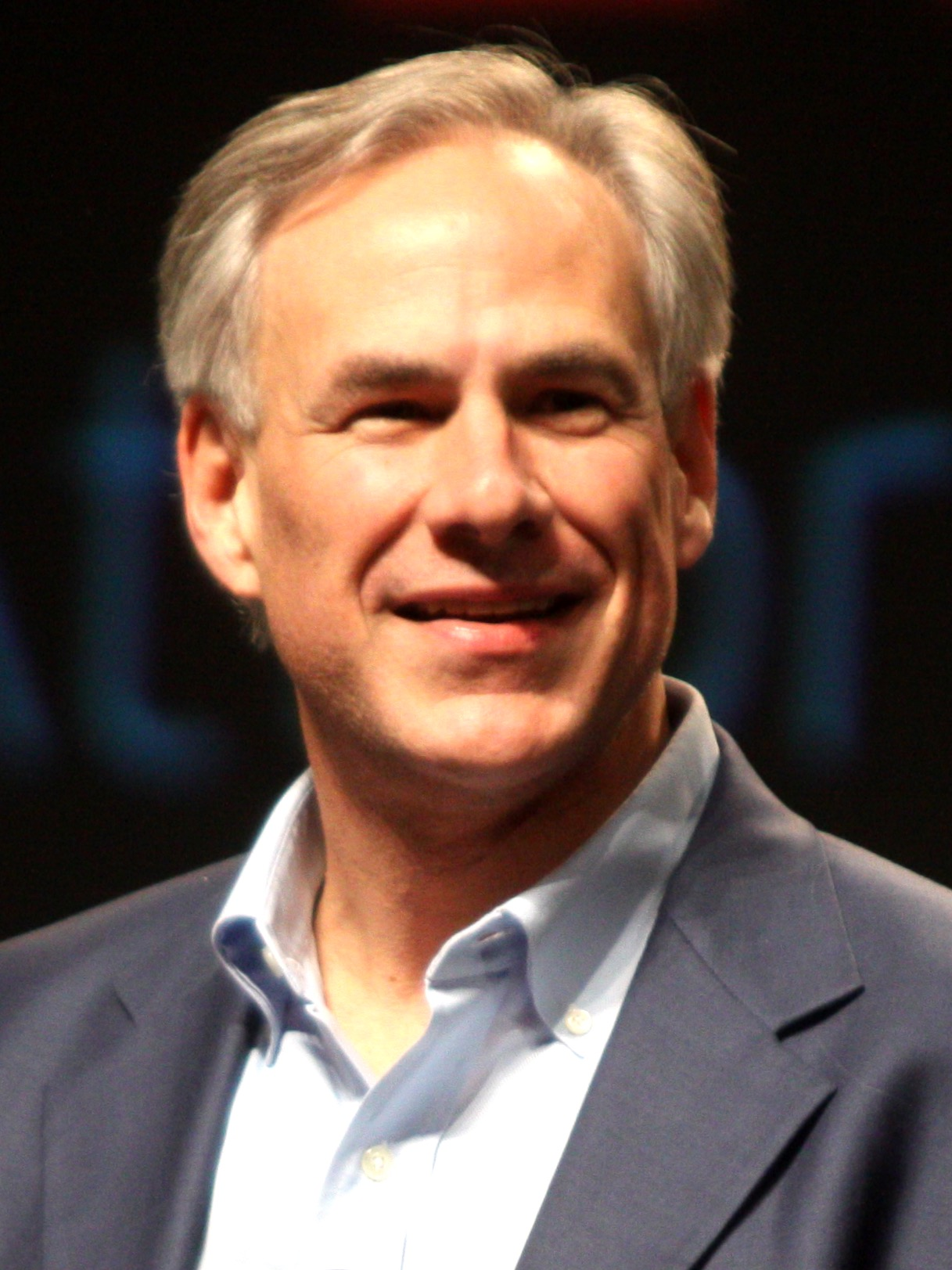

Nominee	Greg Abbott	Barbara Ann Radnofsky
Party	Republican	Democratic
Popular vote	3,151,064	1,655,859
Percentage	64.06%	33.66%
- County results Abbott: 40–50% 50–60% 60–70% 70–80% 80–90% >90% Radnofsky: 40–50% 50–60% 60–70% 70–80%
Attorney General before election
Greg Abbott
Republican
Elected Attorney General
Greg Abbott
Republican

An election was held on November 2, 2010, to elect the Attorney General of Texas. Incumbent Republican Attorney General Greg Abbott successfully ran for re-election and defeated Democratic attorney Barbara Ann Radnofsky with 64.06% of the vote to his final term as attorney general.

== Republican primary ==
=== Candidates ===
- Greg Abbott, incumbent

=== Results ===
Republican primary results
Party	Candidate	Votes	%
Republican	Greg Abbott	1,162,545	100.00
Total votes		1,162,545	100.0

== Democratic primary ==
=== Candidates ===
- Barbara Ann Radnofsky, attorney

=== Results ===
Republican primary results
Party	Candidate	Votes	%
Democratic	Barbara Ann Radnofsky	483,955	100.00
Total votes		483,955	100.0

== General election ==
=== Candidates ===
- Greg Abbott (R), incumbent
- Barbara Ann Radnofsky (D), attorney
- John Roland (Libertarian), author

=== Polling ===
Poll source	Date(s) administered	Sample size	Margin of error	Greg Abbott (R)	Barbara Ann Radnofsky (D)	John Roland (L)	Undecided
UoT/Texas Tribune	September 3 - 8, 2010	800	± 3.46%	43%	26%	5%	26%
Texas Lyceum	September 22 - 30, 2010	416	± 4.75%	56%	29%	—	11%

=== Results ===
On election night Abbott won re-election in a landslide against Radnofsky and Roland.

General election results
Party	Candidate	Votes	%
Republican	Greg Abbott (incumbent)	3,151,064	64.06
Democratic	Barbara Ann Radnofsky	1,655,859	33.66
Libertarian	Jon Roland	112,118	2.28
Total votes		4,919,041	100.0
Turnout			37.07%
Republican hold			

== See also ==
- Texas Attorney General
