= 2002 Texas Attorney General election =

- November 5, 2002
- Turnout: 34.7% (Note: Of registered voters.) ▼2.9%
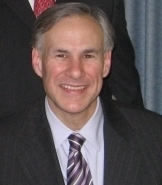

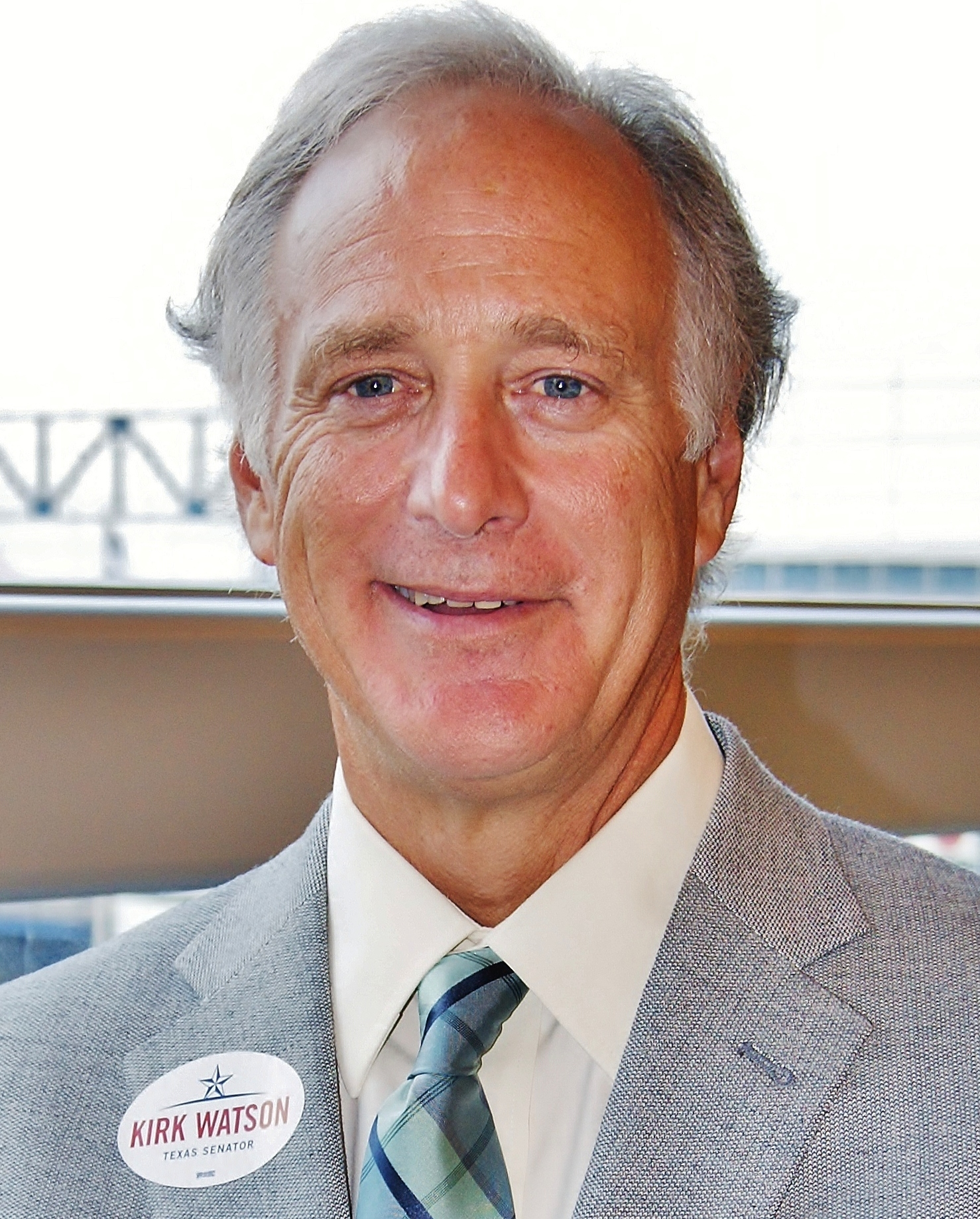
Nominee	Greg Abbott	Kirk Watson
Party	Republican	Democratic
Popular vote	2,542,184	1,841,359
Percentage	56.7%	41.1%
- County results Abbott: 40–50% 50–60% 60–70% 70–80% 80–90% Watson: 40–50% 50–60% 60–70% 70–80% 80–90%
Attorney General before election
John Cornyn
Republican
Elected Attorney General
Greg Abbott
Republican

The 2002 Texas Attorney General election took place on November 5, 2002, to elect the attorney general of Texas. Republican state supreme court justice Greg Abbott defeated Democrat Kirk Watson, the former mayor of Austin, with 56.7% of the vote to win his first term as attorney general, he was sworn into office on December 2, 2002.

== Primaries ==
Primaries were held on March 12, 2002, and runoffs were held on April 9, 2002, for both parties.

Republican primary results
Party	Candidate	Votes	%
Republican	Greg Abbott	540,022	100.0
Total votes		540,022	100.0

Democratic primary results
Party	Candidate	Votes	%
Democratic	Kirk Watson	698,366	100.0
Total votes		698,366	100.0

== General election ==
=== Candidates ===
- Greg Abbott (R), state supreme court justice
- Kirk Watson (D), former mayor of Austin
- John Roland (Libertarian), author
- David Cobb (Green), activist

=== Results ===
On election night Abbott won by a 15% margin against Watson, Roland, and Cobb.

General election results
Party	Candidate	Votes	%
Republican	Greg Abbott	2,542,184	56.72
Democratic	Kirk Watson	1,841,359	41.08
Libertarian	John Roland	56,880	1.27
Green	David Cobb	41,560	0.93
Total votes		4,481,983	100.0
Republican hold			
