= David Van Os =

American politician (1950–2023)

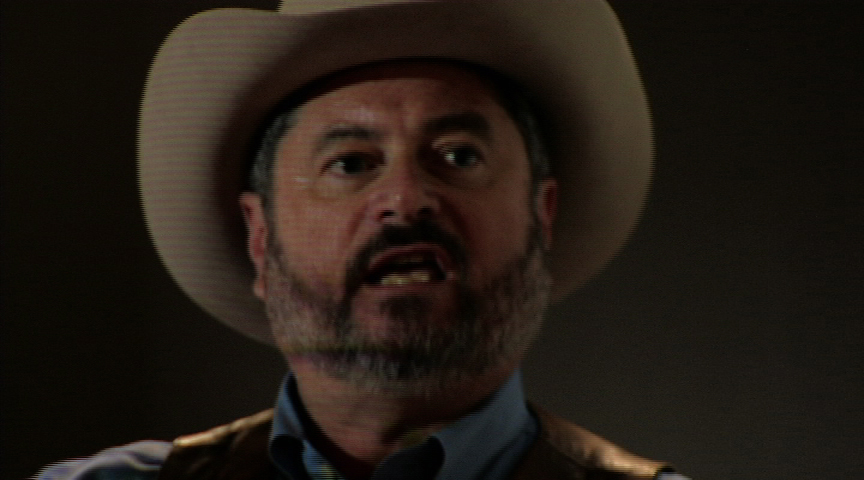
David Van Os in a scene from Brad Mays' feature documentary film, The Audacity of Democracy, 2009.

David Van Os (February 19, 1950 - January 3, 2023) was a Texas attorney, a member of the Democratic Party of Texas, and a frequent candidate for public office. A three-time Democratic nominee for statewide office, he was a self-styled "People's Democrat" and labor attorney.

== Early years ==
David Van Os was born on February 19, 1950, in Kilgore, Texas, to Seymour Van Os and Francene Van Os. He was a National Honor Society and National Merit Finalist at Kilgore High School. Attended University of Texas at Austin on scholastic General Motors Scholarship, 1968–1972; Graduated UT With Honors, May 1972. Selected University of Texas Junior Fellow, 1970 and Entered University of Texas Law School with academic scholarship, 1973; Graduated from the University of Texas Law School with J.D. Degree, 1976. Van Os was honored with Human Rights Research Council Distinguished Research and Writing Award, UT Law School, 1974. Recipient of the 2005 Spine Award by the Backbone Campaign. He served on Board of Directors and as Assistant Treasurer, Texas Equal Access to Justice Foundation, by appointment of the Texas Supreme Court, 1985–1995. In 1990 he was honored with President's Citation for Achievement in Civil Rights by the NAACP. The Texas Women's Political Caucus named him "GOOD GUY OF THE YEAR" in 2002.

A political activist, Van Os attended his first Democratic State Convention in 1972 and attended every one through 2020. He served as president, Northeast Austin Democrats, 1978–1980, Democratic Precinct Chairman #132, Travis County, 1981–1988, County Democratic Chairman, Travis County, 1996–1998, chairman, North East Bexar County Democrats, 2000–2003, Life Member, NAACP Member and Legal Panelist, American Civil Liberties Union, and Member of the Labor Council for Latin American Advancement.

== Law career ==
He was admitted to practice before the United States Supreme Court, the United States Court of Appeals for the Fifth Circuit, and every United States District Court in Texas serving in federal appeals courts, state appeals courts, federal and state trial courts. His accomplishments as an attorney earned him recognition such as: named one of Texas’ Super Lawyers by Texas Monthly in 2003, 2004, and 2005; named in Best Lawyers in America since 1986, by survey of fellow attorneys; rated AV by Martindale-Hubbell, the highest possible evaluation in legal ability and professional ethics, by survey of fellow attorneys; member, College of the State Bar of Texas Fellow, Texas Bar Foundation;

Van Os served as general counsel for the Texas AFL-CIO from 1983 to 1989 and was named Civil Libertarian of the Year, Central Texas ACLU, 1990 and was in-house District Counsel for the Communications Workers of America in Austin from 1981 through 1984; he continued serving as District Counsel for CWA after co-founding a private law firm in 1984, and remains CWA's District Counsel for its five-state District 6. His primary professional concentration has been in classical labor law and workers' rights on the side of unions, serving as legal counsel and trial attorney for a number of labor unions at the international and local union levels over the space of 33 years and continuing at the current time. Other major labor clients of Van Os have included Steelworkers (USW), Carpenters (UBC), Electrical Workers (IBEW), Sheet Metal Workers, Fire Fighters, Musicians (AFM), Deputy Sheriffs of Bexar County, Texas AFL-CIO, and others. Van Os and his wife, Rachel, met on a CWA picket line in 1993. In the 1980s and early 1990s he also represented the NAACP and LULAC in a series of controversial voting rights lawsuits and desegregation suits involving the City of Austin and the Austin Independent School Board. While in law school and in the early years of his career Van Os was mentored in the practice of law by prominent Texas labor and civil rights attorneys Sam Houston Clinton (later a long-serving Judge on the Texas Court of Criminal Appeals) and David R. Richards. He spent the first 23 years of his legal career in Austin before he and Rachel moved their growing family to San Antonio in 1999. After moving to San Antonio he continued to be involved in high-profile issues such as obtaining a temporary restraining order on behalf of the American Federation of Government Employees (AFGE) that temporarily halted the unpopular closing of Kelly Air Force Base. Another prominent client was Bill Burkett in the Killian documents affair, later known as Rathergate, of 2004. Van Os continued to advocate for constitutional rights, civil rights, and worker rights as an active legal counselor and litigator. He was the owner and managing attorney of the law firm of David Van Os & Associates, P.C., of San Antonio Texas. The law firm consists of two attorneys, Van Os and his associate Matt Holder, concentrating in Constitutional law, union-side labor law, and civil rights.

== Political history ==
=== 1998 Texas supreme court bid ===
In 1998, Van Os was the unsuccessful Democratic candidate for a seat on the Texas Supreme Court. He lost to Republican incumbent Greg Abbott by a three-to-two margin. In 2004, he again sought a Supreme Court seat but lost to appointed Republican incumbent Scott Brister.

=== 2006 Texas attorney general bid ===
In October 2006, Van Os proposed constitutional amendments he termed "Citizens' Protection Amendments," to protect Texans from continuing abuses of eminent domain and toll roads. Van Os proposed that the power of eminent domain be limited to reasons of public security and safety. He also proposed that building new toll roads or converting existing public roads to toll roads should only occur if the citizens in the county where the road is to be built or converted approve through passage of voter referendums. He joined other Texan Democratic candidates such as Hank Gilbert, Fred Head, and Maria Luisa Alvarado in speaking out against the proposed Trans-Texas Corridor at public hearings in the summer of 2006.

During his 2006 race for Attorney General of Texas, he vowed to fight for the people of Texas against the large monopolistic oil, insurance and media conglomerates, saying he'd "Fight them until hell freezes over and then fight them on the ice." Much of his funding for his 2006 campaign came from contributions of $20 to $100 from low to medium income donors who met him during his 254 county whistlestop campaign tour or read about him on the blogs. His opponent, Republican incumbent Greg Abbott entered the race with over six million dollars in his campaign war chest.

As the Democratic nominee for attorney general, Van Os took his campaign directly to the people. He pledged to visit all 254 counties in Texas during the 2006 election cycle. With his wife, Rachel Barrios-Van Os, who served as his campaign manager, he visited each courthouse and spoke on the courthouse square. His last five whistlestop were in Tarrant County on October 16, Dallas County on October 17, Harris County on October 18, Travis County on October 19 and his home county of Bexar on October 20. Local supporters joined him on the courthouse steps as he proclaimed his determination to "return Texas government back to the people" denouncing the "bought and paid for perversion of the American political process." In Tarrant, truckdrivers passing on the street, acknowledged him by honking their horns when they saw the signs with his campaign message "Message to Big Oil -- I'm coming after you." During much of 2006 gasoline prices had soared to a record of over three dollars a gallon and dipped rapidly a month before the general election by at least a dollar a gallon. Many people suspected that the timing of the rise and fall was due to political manipulation. Supporters of Van Os funded billboards in many counties in Texas with the following message: "Message to Big Oil - I'm coming after you!" His opponent, Abbott, received considerable money from insurance companies. Van Os vowed to use the office of the attorney general, if elected, to enforce the anti-trust provisions of the Texas and U.S. constitutions, especially regarding insurance company pricing. His other billboard message during the 2006 attorney general's race was: "Insurance Gougers - I'm coming after you!"

== Election history ==
=== Most recent election ===
==== 2006 ====
Texas general election, 2006: Texas Attorney General
| Party | Candidate | Votes | % | ±% |
|---|---|---|---|---|
| Republican | Greg Abbott | 2,556,063 | 59.51 | +2.79 |
| Democratic | David Van Os | 1,599,069 | 37.23 | −3.85 |
| Libertarian | Jon Roland | 139,668 | 3.25 | 1.99 |
| Majority | | 956.994 | 22.28 | 6.65 |
| Turnout | | 4,294,800 | | |
| Republican hold | | | | |

=== Previous elections ===
==== 2004 ====
Texas general election, 2004: Texas Supreme Court, Place 3
| Party | Candidate | Votes | % | ±% |
|---|---|---|---|---|
| Republican | Scott Brister | 4,093,854 | 59.23 | |
| Democratic | David Van Os | 2,817,700 | 40.77 | |
| Majority | | 1,276,154 | 18.46 | |
| Turnout | | 6,911,554 | | |
| Republican hold | | | | |

==== 1998 ====
Texas general election, 1998: Texas Supreme Court, Place 3
| Party | Candidate | Votes | % | ±% |
|---|---|---|---|---|
| Republican | Greg Abbott | 2,104,828 | 60.11 | |
| Democratic | David Van Os | 1,396,924 | 39.89 | |
| Majority | | 707,904 | 20.21 | |
| Turnout | | 3,501,752 | | |
| Republican hold | | | | |

== Personal life ==
In 1972, a year before he began law school, he met his first wife Becky Willard. They were married from 1975 until 1995.

He married Rachel Barrios-Van Os, a native of San Antonio. They had one son, B.J. and three daughters, Kay Cee, Maya and Leya.

== Notes ==
Party political offices
| Preceded by Kirk Watson | Democratic nominee for Texas Attorney General; 2006 | Succeeded by Barbara Ann Radnofsky |
