= Barbara Ann Radnofsky =

American lawyer

Barbara Radnofsky
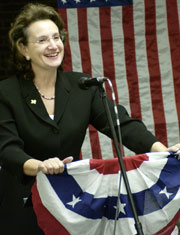
- Radnofsky in 2006

Personal details
- Born: July 8, 1956 (age 70) Broomall, Pennsylvania, U.S.
- Party: Democratic
- Education: University of Houston (BA); University of Texas, Austin (JD)

Barbara Ann Radnofsky (born July 8, 1956) is an American Democratic politician, author and mediator from the U.S. state of Texas. She was the first woman to have won the Democratic nomination for a U.S. Senate seat in Texas.

== Early life and career ==
Radnofsky was born in Broomall, Pennsylvania. She grew up in Houston and entered the University of Houston at age 16 on a National Merit four-year academic scholarship. She received her B.A. in 1976, graduating magna cum laude. She then attended law school at the University of Texas School of Law, graduating with honors in 1979. Radnofsky has three children with her husband, Ed Supkis, a doctor. She is Jewish.

Radnofsky left her partnership at Vinson Elkins, LLP, to become the first woman Texas Democratic U.S. Senate nominee and later the first woman Texas Democratic Attorney General nominee. After those political races, she returned to private law practice focusing on mediation, writing and teaching.

She is the author of the non-partisan “A Citizen’s Guide to Impeachment,” published by Melville House of New York and London in late 2017.

Other related publications:

October 2017 editorial in LA Times

October 2017 editorial in Washington Post

== 2006 Senate campaign ==
Radnofsky announced her candidacy for the Senate on November 15, 2005, at Southern Methodist University in Dallas, Texas, at an event hosted by the SMU chapter of the College Democrats.

On March 7, 2006, Radnofsky faced Gene Kelly and Darrel Reece Hunter in the Democratic primary. Kelly is a perennial candidate and was the Democratic nominee in 2000 after beating out Charles Gandy in a runoff. Radnofsky received 44% of the vote in the primary, while Kelly received 37.5%. Kelly and Radnofsky were forced into a runoff election, held April 11, 2006, which Radnofsky won with 60% of the vote.

Radnofsky lost to Republican incumbent Sen. Kay Bailey Hutchison in the November 7, 2006 General Election. The Zogby poll reported by The Wall Street Journal in September 2006 showed that Radnofsky closed the gap against Hutchison to less than nine points, revealing the race to be close and competitive. Hutchison sank to 45/47.8 percent, with Radnofsky rising to 39 percent. According to Zogby, Radnofsky had closed an 18-point gap from mid-August.

A Zogby poll released Oct. 16 showed Hutchison recovering back to 60% and Radnofsky dropping to 28%.

On Oct. 19, Radnofsky sparred with Hutchison in a taped debate co-sponsored by the Texas League of Women Voters and PBS station KLRN. In the debate Radnofsky criticized Hutchison's position on the Iraq war and for not keeping her promise to serve only two terms.

A poll released by Zogby on Oct. 31 showed Radnofsky gaining 7.9% up to 35.9% and Hutchison losing 5.2% down to 54.8%. Margin of error is 2.9% points.

Radnofsky's innovative Senate campaign website was chosen for archival by the Library of Congress.

== 2010 Texas Attorney General campaign ==
In 2009 Radnofsky filed papers to run for Texas Attorney General. In contrast to her previous race, Radnofsky chose to hire national consultants to work on her campaign. Her media consultant (Murphy Putnam) and her pollster (Pineda Consulting) were part of the Obama consulting team in 2008. She lost the election to incumbent Greg Abbott by a margin of 3,151,064 (64.05%) to 1,655,859 (33.66%).

== Honors and awards ==
She was named as the Outstanding Young Lawyer of Texas (1988–1989) and has delivered more than 140 publications and speeches, both nationally and internationally. She is listed in the Best Lawyers in America in multiple categories.

She earned the AABB Award for Contributions to Medicine Law and Government Affairs.

Radnofsky co-founded the Houston chapter of the National Association of Urban Debate Leagues and has served on many other charitable boards and as a volunteer peer mediation teacher in public and private schools, particularly including students with special needs.

She and her husband, with many other community members, are co-owners of Brazos Bookstore, an independent bookseller.

Party political offices
| Preceded by Gene Kelly | Democratic nominee for U.S. Senator from Texas (Class 1); 2006 | Succeeded by Paul Sadler |
| Preceded by David Van Os | Democratic nominee for Texas Attorney General; 2010 | Succeeded by Sam Houston |
