= 2006 United States Senate election in Texas =

- November 7, 2006
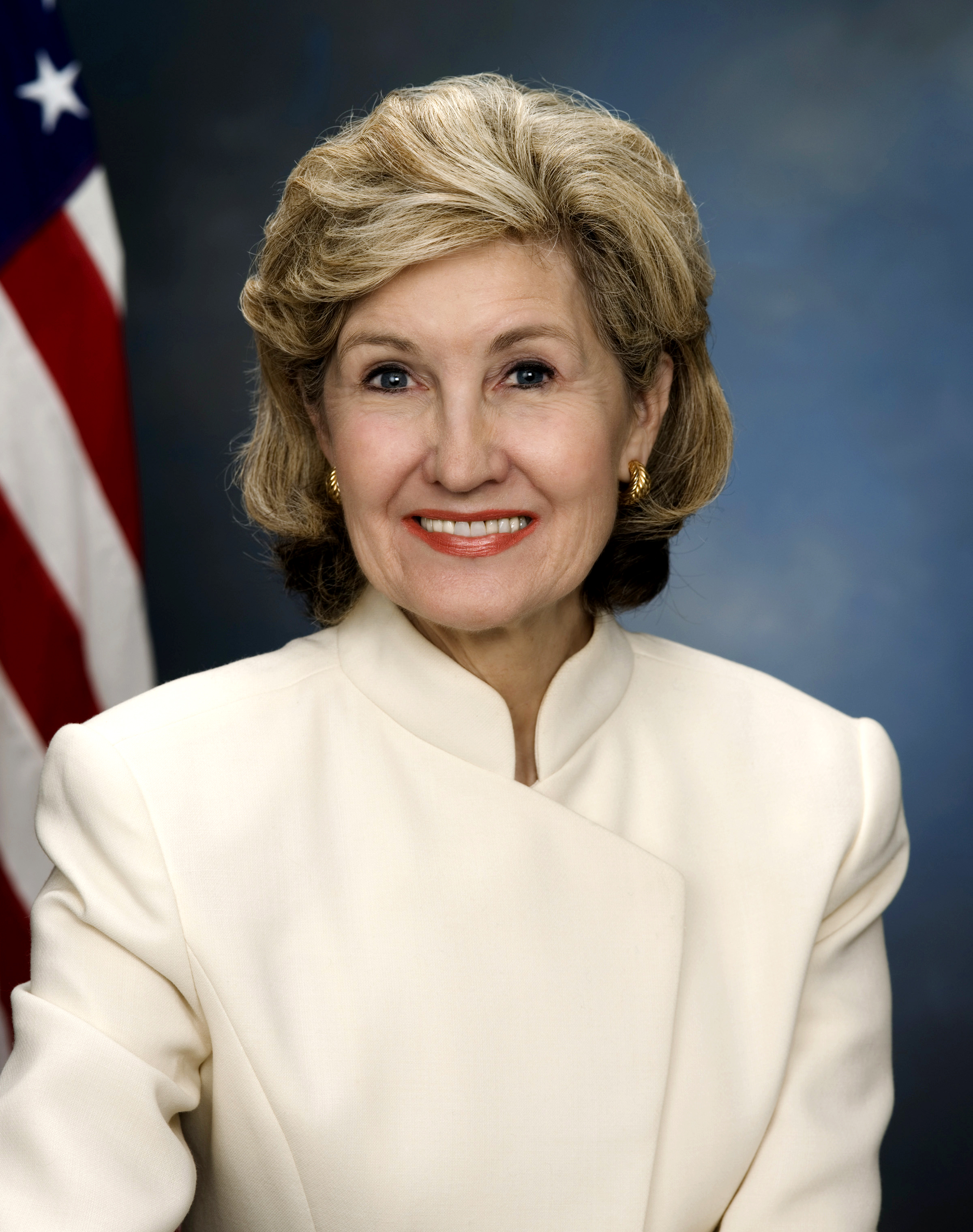

Nominee	Kay Bailey Hutchison	Barbara Ann Radnofsky
Party	Republican	Democratic
Popular vote	2,661,789	1,555,202
Percentage	61.69%	36.04%
- County results Hutchison: 40–50% 50–60% 60–70% 70–80% 80–90% >90% Radnofsky: 50–60% 60–70% 70–80%
U.S. senator before election
Kay Bailey Hutchison
Republican
Elected U.S. Senator
Kay Bailey Hutchison
Republican

The 2006 United States Senate election in Texas was held November 7, 2006. Incumbent Republican Kay Bailey Hutchison won re-election to a third full term, defeating Democrat Barbara Ann Radnofsky.

== Republican primary ==
=== Candidates ===
==== Nominee ====
- Kay Bailey Hutchison, incumbent U.S. senator

Republican primary results
Party	Candidate	Votes	%
Republican	Kay Bailey Hutchison (incumbent)	627,163	100.00%
Total votes		627,163	100.00%

== Democratic primary ==
First round results by county: Radnofsky: 30–40%; 40–50%; 50–60%; 60–70%; 70–80%; Kelly: 30–40%; 40–50%; 50–60%; 60–70%; Hunter: 30–40%; Tie

=== Candidates ===
==== Nominee ====
- Barbara Ann Radnofsky, author and mediator

==== Eliminated in runoff ====
- Gene Kelly, perennial candidate and Democratic nominee for U.S. Senate in 2000

===== Eliminated in primary =====
- Darrel Reece Hunter, perennial candidate

Democratic primary results
Party	Candidate	Votes	%
Democratic	Barbara Ann Radnofsky	215,776	43.09%
Democratic	Gene Kelly	191,400	38.22%
Democratic	Darrel Reece Hunter	93,609	18.69%
Total votes		500,785	100.00%

Runoff results by county: Radnofsky: 50–60%; 60–70%; 70–80%; 80–90%; >90%; Kelly: 50–60%; 60–70%; 70–80%; Tie

=== Runoff ===
Because no candidate received a majority of votes in the Democratic primary, a runoff was held April 11, 2006. Attorney Barbara Ann Radnofsky prevailed over Gene Kelly in the runoff.

Democratic runoff results
Party	Candidate	Votes	%
Democratic	Barbara Ann Radnofsky	124,663	60.15%
Democratic	Gene Kelly	82,589	39.85%
Total votes		207,252	100.00%

== Third party candidates ==
Scott Lanier Jameson won the Libertarian Party nomination at the party's state convention on June 10, 2006, defeating Timothy Wade and Ray Salinas. Arthur W. Loux, a Roman Forest city councilman and a member of the Minutemen, ran as an independent.

== Campaign ==
Incumbent Republican Senator Kay Bailey Hutchison had co-sponsored legislation supporting a constitutional amendment that would contain senatorial term limits, but stated that she would only leave office after two terms if such limits applied to all senators. After deciding not to challenge Governor Rick Perry in a Republican gubernatorial primary, Hutchison sought re-election to the Senate for a third full term.

=== Debate ===
2006 United States Senate election in Texas debate
No.	Date	Host	Moderator	Link	Republican	Democratic	Libertarian
Key: P Participant A Absent N Not invited I Invited W Withdrawn							
Key: P Participant A Absent N Not invited I Invited W Withdrawn					Kay Bailey Hutchison	Barbara Ann Radnofsky	Scott Jameson
1	Oct. 19, 2006	KLRN; Texas League of Women Voters	Yolette Garcia	C-SPAN	P	P	P

=== Predictions ===
Source	Ranking	As of
The Cook Political Report	Solid R	November 6, 2006
Sabato's Crystal Ball	Safe R	November 6, 2006
Rothenberg Political Report	Safe R	November 6, 2006
Real Clear Politics	Safe R	November 6, 2006

=== Polling ===
Source	Date	Hutchison (R)	Radnofsky (D)
Polimetrix	November 5, 2006	65%	29%
Zogby	October 25, 2006	61%	27%
Rasmussen	October 23, 2006	60%	34%
Rasmussen	August 31, 2006	58%	32%
Rasmussen	August 3, 2006	61%	31%
Rasmussen	July 13, 2006	58%	31%
Rasmussen	May 18, 2006	53%	34%
Rasmussen	January 8, 2006	64%	25%

=== Endorsements ===
Kay Bailey Hutchison (R)

Newspapers

- Austin American-Statesman
- The Beaumont Enterprise
- El Paso Times
- Fort Worth Star-Telegram
- Houston Chronicle
- The Marshall News Messenger
- San Antonio Express-News
- Times Record News
- Tyler Morning Telegraph

=== Results ===
United States Senate election in Texas, 2006
Party	Candidate	Votes	%	±%
Republican	Kay Bailey Hutchison (incumbent)	2,661,789	61.69%	−4.65%
Democratic	Barbara Ann Radnofsky	1,555,202	36.04%	+3.69%
Libertarian	Scott Jameson	97,672	2.26%	+1.10%
Majority		1,106,587	25.65%	−7.12%
Turnout		4,314,663		
Republican hold				

==== Counties that flipped from Democratic to Republican ====
- Newton (largest city: Newton)

==== Counties that flipped from Republican to Democratic ====
- Travis (largest city: Austin)
- Webb (largest city: Laredo)

== See also ==
- 2006 United States Senate elections
