= Greg Abbott =

Governor of Texas since 2015

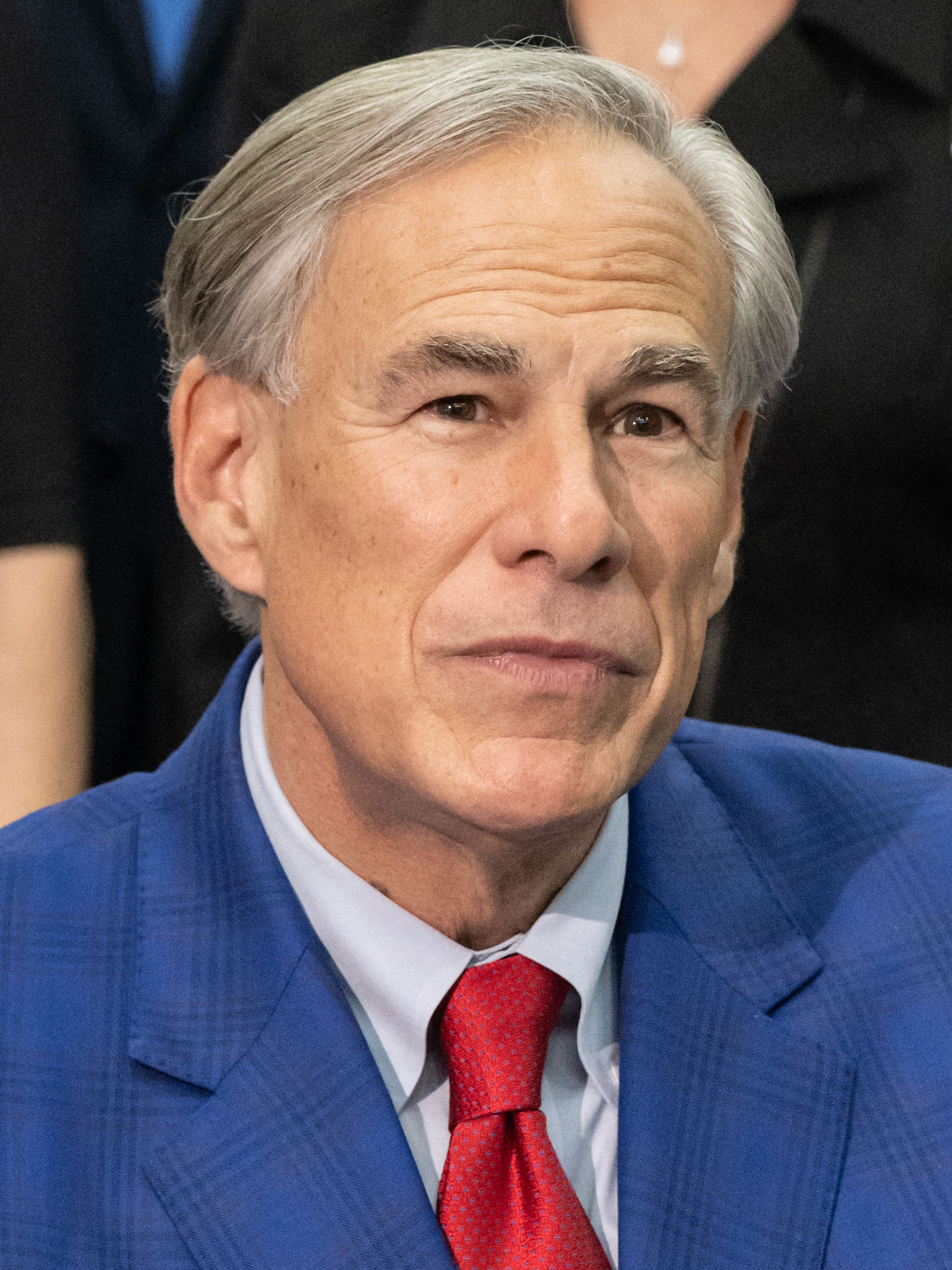
- Abbott in 2024

48th Governor of Texas
- Incumbent
- Assumed office January 20, 2015
- Lieutenant: Dan Patrick
- Preceded by: Rick Perry

Chair of the Republican Governors Association
- In office November 21, 2019 – December 9, 2020
- Preceded by: Pete Ricketts
- Succeeded by: Doug Ducey

50th Attorney General of Texas
- In office December 2, 2002 – January 5, 2015
- Governor: Rick Perry
- Preceded by: John Cornyn
- Succeeded by: Ken Paxton

Justice of the Supreme Court of Texas
- In office January 2, 1996 – June 6, 2001
- Appointed by: George W. Bush
- Preceded by: Jack Hightower
- Succeeded by: Xavier Rodriguez

Personal details
- Born: Gregory Wayne Abbott; November 13, 1957 (age 69) Wichita Falls, Texas, U.S.
- Party: Republican
- Spouse: Cecilia Phalen (m. 1981)
- Children: 1
- Education: University of Texas at Austin (BBA); Vanderbilt University (JD)
- Website: Office website Campaign website
- Greg Abbott's voice Abbott on the reopening of Texas's economy following the COVID-19 pandemic Recorded May 7, 2020

Gregory Wayne Abbott (/æbət/ ABB-ət; born November 13, 1957) is an American politician and lawyer serving since 2015 as the 48th governor of Texas. A member of the Republican Party, he served from 2002 to 2015 as the 50th attorney general of Texas and from 1996 to 2001 as a justice of the Texas Supreme Court. As of 2026, Abbott is the longest-serving incumbent governor in the United States.

Born in Wichita Falls, Texas, he graduated from the University of Texas at Austin and Vanderbilt University Law School. After practicing law at a limited liability partnership between 1984 and 1992, he served as a state trial judge in the 129th District Court for three years. In 1995, Abbott was appointed to the Texas Supreme Court by Governor George W. Bush and was reelected to a full term in 1998. After he resigned from the Supreme Court to run for Texas lieutenant governor, he returned to private practice.

Elected Texas attorney general in 2002, Abbott was reelected in 2006 and 2010. During his tenure, he defended the display of the Ten Commandments at the Texas State Capitol in the 2005 U.S. Supreme Court case Van Orden v. Perry, and unsuccessfully defended the state's ban on same-sex marriage. He was also involved in numerous lawsuits against the administration of Barack Obama, seeking to invalidate the Affordable Care Act and federal environmental regulations.

Abbott was elected Texas governor in 2014 and reelected in 2018 and 2022. Closely aligned with Donald Trump, he enacted a conservative agenda, including maintaining Texas's total abortion ban, increasing law enforcement funding, and restricting voting rights. During the COVID-19 pandemic, he opposed face mask and vaccine mandates and issued executive orders restricting local governments and businesses from implementing their own requirements. In 2026 he ran for re-election, but lost to Democratic nominee Gina Hinojosa in an upset.

== Early life, education, and legal career ==
Abbott was born on November 13, 1957 in Wichita Falls, Texas. His mother, Doris Lechristia Jacks Abbott, was a housewife and his father, Calvin Rodger Abbott, was a stockbroker and insurance agent. When he was six years old, they moved to Longview; the family lived there for six years. When he was 12, Abbott's family moved to Duncanville. In his sophomore year in high school, his father died of a heart attack; his mother went to work in a real estate office. Abbott attended Duncanville High School, where he was on the track team, graduating in 1976.

In 1981, Abbott earned a Bachelor of Business Administration in finance from the University of Texas at Austin, where he was a member of the Delta Tau Delta fraternity and the Young Republicans Club. He met his wife, Cecilia Phalen, while attending UT Austin. The two married in 1981. In 1984, he earned his Juris Doctor degree from Vanderbilt University Law School.

Abbott went into private practice, working for Butler and Binion, LLP between 1984 and 1992.

== Judicial career ==
Abbott's judicial career began in Houston, where he served as a state trial judge in the 129th District Court for three years. Governor George W. Bush appointed Abbott to the state's highest civil court, Texas Supreme Court, to which he was twice elected, in 1996 (for a two-year term) and in 1998 (six-year term). In 1996, Abbott was challenged by Libertarian John B. Hawley of Dallas. Abbott defeated Hawley, 84% to 16%. In 1998, Abbott defeated Democrat David Van Os, 60% to 40%.

In 2001, after resigning from the Supreme Court, Abbott returned to private practice and worked for Bracewell & Giuliani LLC. He was also an adjunct professor at University of Texas School of Law.

== Attorney General of Texas (2002–2015) ==
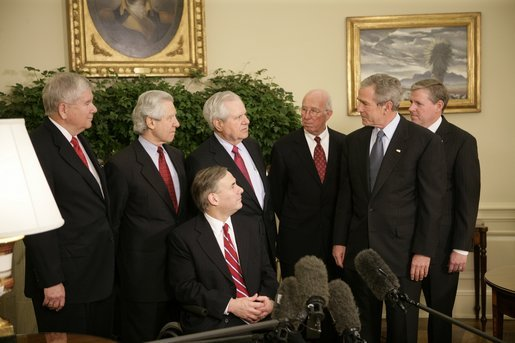
Abbott (bottom) talking about the Harriet Miers nomination with President George W. Bush and former Texas Supreme Court Justices in 2005. From left: Eugene Cook, Raul Gonzalez, Abbott, John Hill, James Baker, Bush, and Craig Enoch

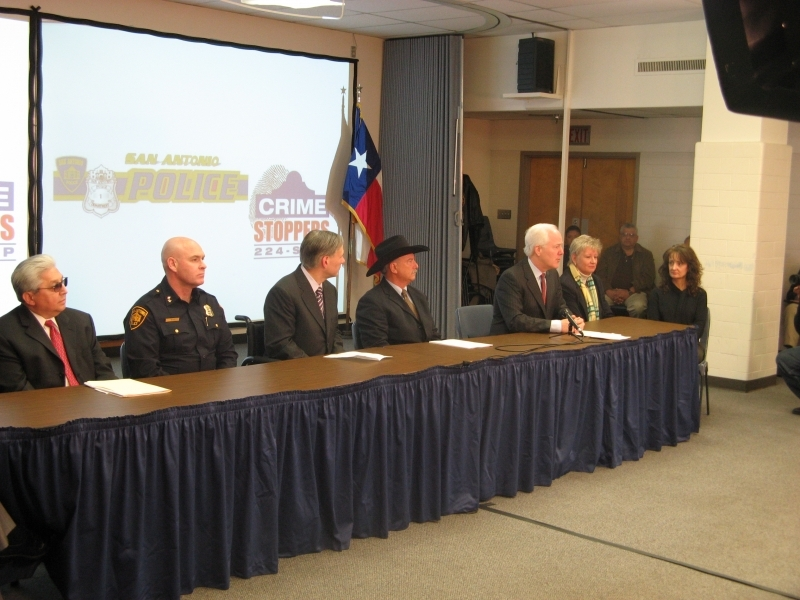
Abbott (center in wheelchair) and Texas Senator John Cornyn highlighting Crime Stoppers Month in San Antonio, 2008

=== 2002 election ===
Abbott resigned from the Texas Supreme Court on June 6, 2001, to run for lieutenant governor of Texas. He had been campaigning for several months when the previous attorney general, John Cornyn, vacated the post to run for the U.S. Senate. Abbott then switched his campaign to the open attorney general's position in 2002. He defeated the Democratic nominee, former Austin mayor and former state senator Kirk Watson, 57% to 41%. Abbott was sworn in on December 2, 2002, following Cornyn's election to the Senate.

=== Tenure ===
Abbott expanded the attorney general's office's law enforcement division from about 30 people to more than 100. He also created a new division, the Fugitive Unit, to track down convicted sex offenders in violation of their paroles or probations.

In 2003, Abbott supported the Texas Legislature's move to cap non-economic damages for medical malpractice cases at $250,000, with no built-in increases for rising cost of living.

In a 2013 speech to fellow Republicans, when asked what his job entails, Abbott said: "I go into the office in the morning, I sue Barack Obama, and then I go home." Abbott filed 31 lawsuits against the Obama administration, including suits against the Environmental Protection Agency; the U.S. Department of Health and Human Services, including challenges to the Affordable Care Act ("Obamacare"); and the U.S. Department of Education, among many others. According to The Wall Street Journal, Texas sued the Obama administration at least 44 times, more than any other state; court challenges included carbon-emission standards, health-care reform, transgender rights, and others. The Dallas Morning News compared Abbott to Scott Pruitt, noting that both attorneys general had repeatedly sued the federal government over its environmental regulations. The Houston Chronicle noted that Abbott "led the charge against Obama-era climate regulations".

Abbott has said that the state must not release Tier II Chemical Inventory Reports for security reasons, but that Texans "can ask every facility whether they have chemicals or not". Koch Industries has denied that its contributions to Abbott's campaign had anything to do with his ruling against releasing the safety information.

In March 2014, Abbott filed a motion to intervene on behalf of Baylor Plano in three federal lawsuits against the hospital, brought by patients who alleged that the hospital allowed Christopher Duntsch to perform neurosurgery despite knowing that he was a dangerous physician. Abbott cited the Texas legislature's cap on malpractice cases and the statute's removal of the term "gross negligence" from the definition of legal malice as reasons for defending Baylor.

In the late 2000s, Abbott established a unit in the attorney general's office to pursue voter-fraud prosecutions, using a $1.4 million federal grant; the unit prosecuted a few dozen cases, resulting in small fines and little to no jail time. The office found no large-scale fraud that could change the outcome of any election.

==== Lawsuit against Sony BMG ====
In December 2005, Abbott sued Sony BMG. Texas was the first state in the nation to bring legal action against Sony BMG for illegal spyware. The suit was also the first filed under the state's spyware law of 2005. It alleged the company surreptitiously installed the spyware on millions of compact music discs (CDs) that consumers inserted into their computers when they played the CDs, which can compromise the systems. On December 21, 2005, Abbott added new allegations to his lawsuit against Sony BMG. He said the MediaMax copy protection technology violated Texas's spyware and deceptive trade practices laws. Sony BMG offered consumers a licensing agreement when they bought CDs and played them on their computers; in the lawsuit, brought under the Consumer Protection Against Computer Spyware Act of 2005 and other laws, Abbott alleged that even if consumers rejected that agreement, spyware was secretly installed on their computers, posing security risks for music buyers and deceiving Texas purchasers. Sony settled the Texas lawsuit, as well as a similar suit brought by California's attorney general, for $1.5 million.

==== Separation of church and state ====
In March 2005, Abbott delivered oral argument before the United States Supreme Court on behalf of Texas, defending a Ten Commandments monument on grounds of the Texas State Capitol. Thousands of similar monuments were donated to cities and towns across the nation by the Fraternal Order of Eagles, who were inspired by the Cecil B. DeMille film The Ten Commandments (1956) in the years that followed. In his deposition, Abbott said, "The Ten Commandments are a historically recognized system of law." The Supreme Court held in a 5–4 decision that the Texas display did not violate the First Amendment's Establishment Clause and was constitutional.

==== Firearms ====
Abbott opposed gun control legislation. In 2013, he criticized legislation enacted by New York State strengthening its gun regulation laws by expanding an assault weapons ban and creating a high-capacity magazine ban; he also said he would sue if Congress enacted a new gun-control bill. After the law passed, Abbott's political campaign placed Internet ads to users with Albany and Manhattan ZIP codes suggesting that New York gun owners should move to Texas. One ad read, "Is Gov. Cuomo looking to take your guns?", and the other read, "Wanted: Law abiding New York gun owners looking for lower taxes and greater opportunity." The ads linked to a letter on Facebook in which Abbott wrote that such a move would enable citizens "to keep more of what you earn and use some of that extra money to buy more ammo".

In February 2014, Abbott argued against a lawsuit brought by the National Rifle Association of America (NRA) to allow more people access to concealed carry of firearms, as he felt this would disrupt public safety.

==== Tort reform ====
Abbott backed legislation in Texas to limit "punitive damages stemming from noneconomic losses" and "noneconomic damages in medical malpractice cases" at $750,000 and $250,000, respectively. While the settlement in his own paralysis case was a "nonmedical liability lawsuit", which remains uncapped, Abbott has faced criticism, generally from Democrats who oppose the Republican-backed lawsuit curbs, for "tilt[ing] the judicial scales toward civil defendants."

==== Support for ban on sex toys ====
Abbott unsuccessfully defended Texas's ban on sex toys. He said Texas had a legitimate interest in "discouraging prurient interests in autonomous sex and the pursuit of sexual gratification unrelated to procreation."

==== Opposition to same-sex marriage ====
Abbott defended the state's ban on same-sex marriage from a constitutional challenge. In 2014, he argued in court that Texas should be allowed to prohibit same-sex marriage because LGBT individuals cannot procreate. He said that as "same-sex relationships do not naturally produce children, recognizing same-sex marriage does not further these goals to the same extent that recognizing opposite-sex marriage does." He also argued that gay people are still free to marry, saying they are "as free to marry an opposite-sex spouse as anyone else". He suggested that same-sex marriage led to a slippery slope in which "any conduct that has been traditionally prohibited can become a constitutional right simply by redefining it at a higher level of abstraction."

In 2016, Abbott urged the Texas Supreme Court to limit the impact of the U.S. Supreme Court's ruling in Obergefell v. Hodges, the 2015 case that held that the 14th Amendment requires all states to recognize same-sex marriages and made same-sex couples eligible for state and federal benefits tied to marriage, including the right to be listed on a birth certificate and the right to adopt.

==== 2006 election ====
In the November 7, 2006, general election, Abbott was challenged by civil rights attorney David Van Os, who had been his Democratic opponent in the 1998 election for state Supreme Court. He was reelected to a second term with 60% to Van Os's 37%.

==== 2010 election ====
Abbott ran for a third term in 2010. He defeated the Democratic nominee, attorney Barbara Ann Radnofsky, with 64% of the vote to her 34%. He was the longest-serving Texas attorney general in Texas history.

In July 2013, the Houston Chronicle alleged improper ties and oversight between many of Abbott's largest donors and the Cancer Prevention and Research Institute of Texas, of which he was a director.

== Gubernatorial campaigns ==
=== 2014 election ===
Final results by county in 2014 Greg Abbott: >90%; 80–90%; 70–80%; 60–70%; 50–60%; 40–50%; Wendy Davis: 70–80%; 60–70%; 50–60%; 40–50%

In July 2013, shortly after Governor Rick Perry announced he would not seek a fourth full term, Abbott announced his candidacy for governor of Texas in the 2014 election. In the first six months of 2011, he raised more money for his campaign than any other previous Texas politician, reaching $1.6 million. The next-highest fundraiser among state officeholders was Texas comptroller Susan Combs, with $611,700.

Abbott won the Republican primary on March 4, 2014, with 91.5% of the vote. He faced State Senator Wendy Davis in the general election.

Abbott promised to "tie outcomes to funding" for pre-K programs if elected, but said he would not require government standardized testing for 4-year-olds, as Davis accused him of suggesting. When defending his education plan, Abbott cited Charles Murray: "Family background has the most decisive effect on student achievement, contributing to a large performance gap between children from economically disadvantaged families and those from middle class homes." A spokesman for Abbott's campaign pointed out that the biggest difference in spending was that Davis had proposed universal pre-K education while Abbott wanted to limit state funding to programs that meet certain standards. Davis's plan could reach $750 million in cost and Abbott said that her plan was a "budget buster", whereas his education plan would cost no more than $118 million. Overall, Abbott said the reforms he envisioned would "level the playing field for all students [and] target schools which don't have access to the best resources." He called for greater access to technology in the classroom and mathematics instruction for kindergarten pupils.

Abbott received $1.4 million in campaign contributions from recipients of the Texas Enterprise Fund, some of whose members submitted the proper paperwork for grants. Elliot Nagin of the Union of Concerned Scientists observed that Abbott was the recipient of large support from the fossil fuels industries, such as NuStar Energy, Koch Industries, Valero Energy, ExxonMobil, Chevron, and ConocoPhillips. He and Dan Patrick, the Republican nominee for lieutenant governor, were endorsed by the NRA Political Victory Fund and given an "A" rating.

Abbott defeated Davis by over 20 percentage points in the November general election.

=== 2018 election ===
Final results by county in 2018 Greg Abbott: >90%; 80–90%; 70–80%; 60–70%; 50–60%; 40–50%; Lupe Valdez: 70–80%; 60–70%; 50–60%; 40–50%

In January 2017, Abbott was reportedly raising funds for a 2018 reelection bid as governor; as of December 2016, he had $34.4 million on hand for his campaign, of which he had raised $9 million during the second half of 2016. Lieutenant Governor Dan Patrick had been mentioned as a potential challenger, but confirmed that he would run for reelection as lieutenant governor. During the weekend of January 21, 2017, Abbott said that he intended to run for reelection. He confirmed this on March 28, 2017.

Abbott formally announced his reelection campaign on July 14, 2017. This came four days before the start of a special legislative session that could split the Republican Party into factions favoring Abbott and Patrick on one hand and House speaker Joe Straus on the other. Straus represented the Moderate Republican faction, which opposes much of the social conservative agenda Abbott and Patrick pursued.

In the November 6 general election, Abbott defeated Democratic nominee Lupe Valdez with about 56% of the vote, having outraised her 18 to 1. He received 42% of the Hispanic and 16% of the African American vote.

=== 2022 election ===
Final results by county in 2022 Greg Abbott: >90%; 80–90%; 70–80%; 60–70%; 50–60%; 40–50%; Beto O'Rourke: 70–80%; 60–70%; 50–60%

Abbott ran for a third term and faced challengers from within his own party, including former Texas Republican Party chair Allen West and Don Huffines. On March 1, he won the primary with over 66% of the vote. He was challenged by the Democratic nominee, former U.S. representative Beto O'Rourke. Abbott began with a large campaign funding advantage over his opponents, but was outraised by O'Rourke, who raised $81.6 million to Abbott's $78.5 million.

Abbott defeated O'Rourke, 55% to 44%, becoming the fifth Texas governor to serve three terms, after Allan Shivers, Price Daniel, John Connally and Rick Perry.

=== 2026 election ===
Final results by county in 2026 Gina Hinojosa: 70–80%; 60–70%; 50–60%; 40–50%; Greg Abbott: >90%; 80–90%; 70–80%; 60–70%; 50–60%; 40–50%

On November 9, 2025, Abbott announced his candidacy for reelection to a fourth term. In the Republican primary on March 3, 2026, he received 81.8% of the vote.

The election marked the first gubernatorial election since 2010 that did not feature a debate between the two major party candidates.

On November 3, 2026, Abbott conceded the general election to Gina Hinojosa, who will become the state's first Hispanic governor. Hinojosa received 52.8% of the vote to Abbott's 45.7%.

== Governor of Texas (2015–present) ==
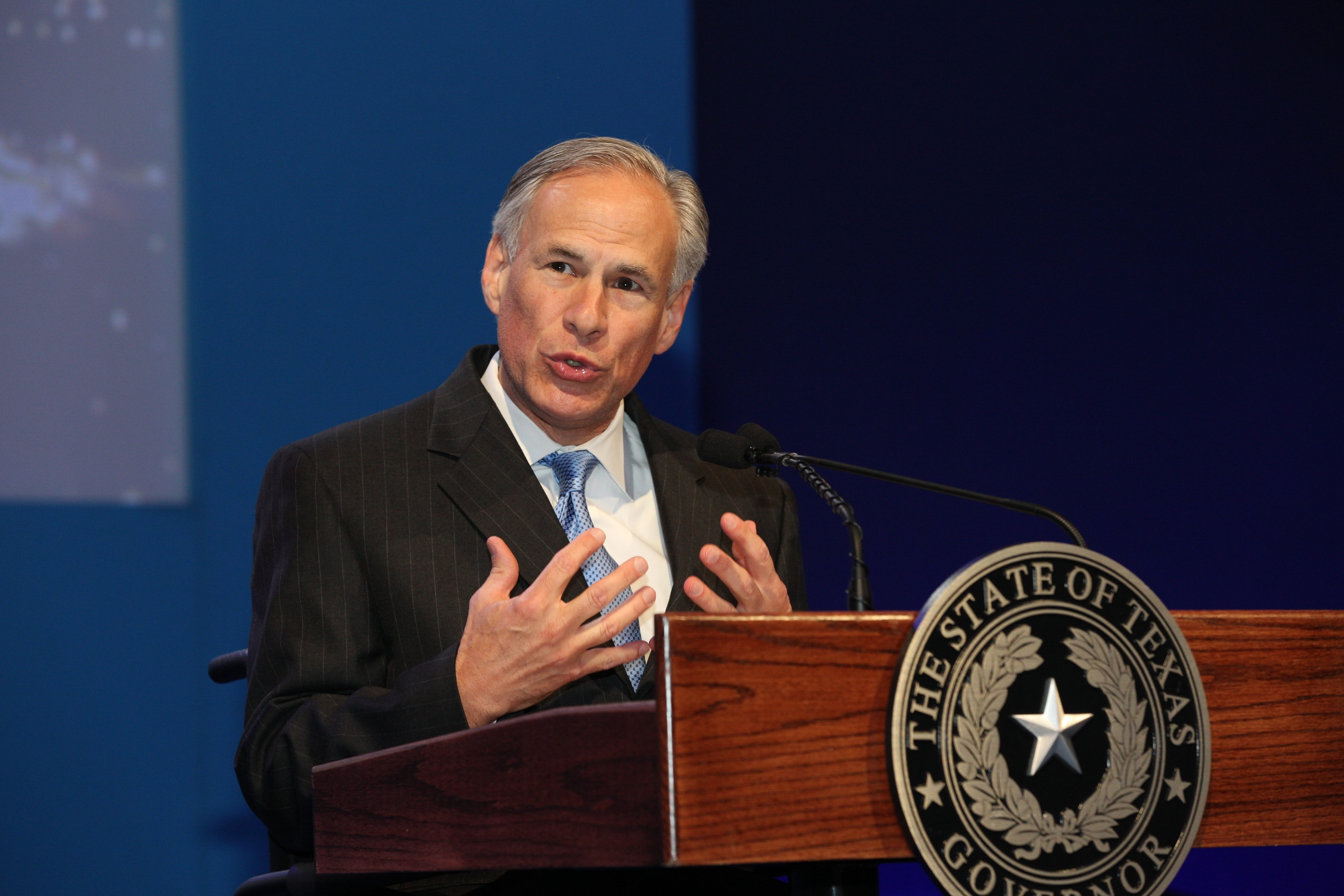
Abbott speaking at the 2016 World Travel and Tourism Council conference

Abbott was sworn in as governor of Texas on January 20, 2015, succeeding Rick Perry. He is the first governor of Texas and the third elected governor of a U.S. state to use a wheelchair, after Franklin D. Roosevelt of New York (1929–1932) and George Wallace of Alabama (1963–1967; 1971–1979; 1983–1987).

Abbott held his first meeting with a foreign prime minister when he met with the Irish Taoiseach Enda Kenny on March 15, 2015, to discuss trade and economic relations.

During the 2015 legislative session, initiated by officials at the Texas Health and Human Services Commission, the Texas legislature placed a rider to cut $150 million from its budget by ending payments and coverage for various developmental therapies for children on Medicaid. A lawsuit was filed against the state on behalf of affected families and therapy providers, claiming the cut could cause irreparable damage to the affected children's development. The litigation obtained a temporary injunction order on September 25, 2015, barring THHSC from implementing therapy rate cuts.

During Donald Trump's first presidency, Abbott ardently supported Trump. The Trump administration appointed several former Abbott appointees to federal courts, which some media outlets attributed to Abbott's influence on the administration. In 2021, Trump endorsed Abbott for reelection, choosing him over several Republican primary rivals who also positioned themselves as pro-Trump.

Abbott's book Broken But Unbowed (2016) recounted Abbott's personal story and views on politics.

In October 2016, explosive packages were mailed to Abbott, President Obama, and the commissioner of the Social Security Administration. Abbott's package did not explode when he opened it because "he did not open [the package] as intended".

On June 6, 2017, Abbott called for a special legislative session in order to pass several of his legislative priorities, an agenda supported by Lieutenant Governor Dan Patrick. Abbott vetoed 50 bills in the regular 2017 session, the most in a session since 2007.

As chair of the State Preservation Board, he was part of the unanimous vote by the board to remove a plaque placed by the Children of the Confederacy from the Texas State Capitol.

Abbott appointed multiple judges to various judgeships, including several GOP-affiliated judges who had recently lost local judicial elections.

After the regular 2021 session, The New York Times called Abbott and Patrick "the driving force behind one of the hardest right turns in recent state history". Other sources said Abbott and other state officials advanced strongly conservative policies. By his 2022 reelection campaign, Abbott more prominently emphasized "culture war" issues. He had been compared to Florida Governor Ron DeSantis in promoting conservative policies.

According to a report by The Texas Tribune and ProPublica, Abbott centralized power under the governor's office during his tenure.

=== Abortion ===
In November 2016, the State of Texas, at Abbott's request, approved new rules that require facilities that perform abortions either to bury or cremate the aborted, rather than dispose of the remains in a sanitary landfill. The rules were intended to go into effect on December 19, but on December 15 a federal judge blocked them from going into effect for at least one month after the Center for Reproductive Rights and other advocacy groups filed a lawsuit. On January 27, 2017, a federal judge ruled against the law, but the State of Texas vowed to appeal the ruling.

On June 6, 2017, Abbott signed a bill into law banning dismemberment and partial-birth abortions and requiring either burial or cremation of the aborted. That law was also blocked by a federal judge; the state said it would appeal.

On May 18, 2021, Abbott signed the Texas Heartbeat Act, a six-week abortion ban, into law. In September 2021, he signed into law a bill preventing women from mail-ordering abortion medication seven weeks into pregnancy.

=== Artificial Intelligence and data centers ===
In 2023, Abbott formed an Artificial Intelligence Advisory Council to monitor the devlopment and use of AI by the state government.

In June 2025, Abbott signed House Bill 2559, which restricts municipal moratoriums on property development. The law lengthens required notice from four days to 30, mandates two public hearings held at least 30 days apart, requires a three-fourths vote of a city council for a moratorium to take effect, caps any moratorium at 180 days in the aggregate, and bars municipalities from imposing comparable moratoriums in the same area for two years. State Senator Paul Bettencourt, the Senate sponsor of House Bill 2559, invoked both laws in challenges to local efforts to block data center construction, including a moratorium in Hood County and a zoning ban San Marcos adopted in June 2026.

Prior to Abbott's tenure the legislature had passed legislation which provided tax exemptions for data center construction, developers took adavantage of the exemptions along with Texas' business friendly atmosphere to rapidly upscale production of data centers within the state. As of 2026, the state had over 300 data centers with the number expected to almost double by 2030, including plans for the largest AI data center in the world. Abbott welcomed the projects. When Google announced they were investing $40 billion in Texas to construct three new data centers, Abbot stated "Texas is the epicenter of AI development" and "We must ensure that America remains at the forefront of the AI revolution, and Texas is the place where that can happen."

The rapid development of data centers created strains on local infrastructure and beginning in 2026, Abbott pivoted and began proposing new regulations for their construction. Some of the policies included requiring data centers to pay for their own electric infrastructure and recycle their water usage. He also called on repealing the tax breaks that were causing the state to lose potentially billions of dollars in tax revenue. In June 2026, Abbott called for a ban on constructing data centers in rural neighborhoods. In August, he issued a temporary moratorium on the construction of new data centers in the state pending an audit to determine their impact on local communities. Regulators argued that they did not have the authority to halt all projects, so in August Abbott expanded the directive to not grant any enviornmental permits till the audit was completed. Crtics of Abbott accused him of feigning support for regulations and that the moratoriums were political theater and not genuine.

=== College diversity, equity, and inclusion ===
In 2023, Abbott signed into law Senate Bill 17, which prohibits Diversity, Equity, and Inclusion (DEI) offices at Texas's public colleges and universities. The bill, passed largely along party lines, garnered both support and criticism, with proponents arguing it would save taxpayer funds and promote a merit-based approach to education and critics expressing concern about discrimination and hindrance to diversity efforts.

As a result of Senate Bill 17 and similar legislation, universities have been compelled to reevaluate their DEI initiatives, often leading to significant restructuring and reallocation of resources. Senate Bill 17's implementation led the University of Texas at Austin to lay off about 60 employees and close of the Division of Campus and Community Engagement, which was formerly the Division of Diversity and Community Engagement.

=== Convention of States proposal ===
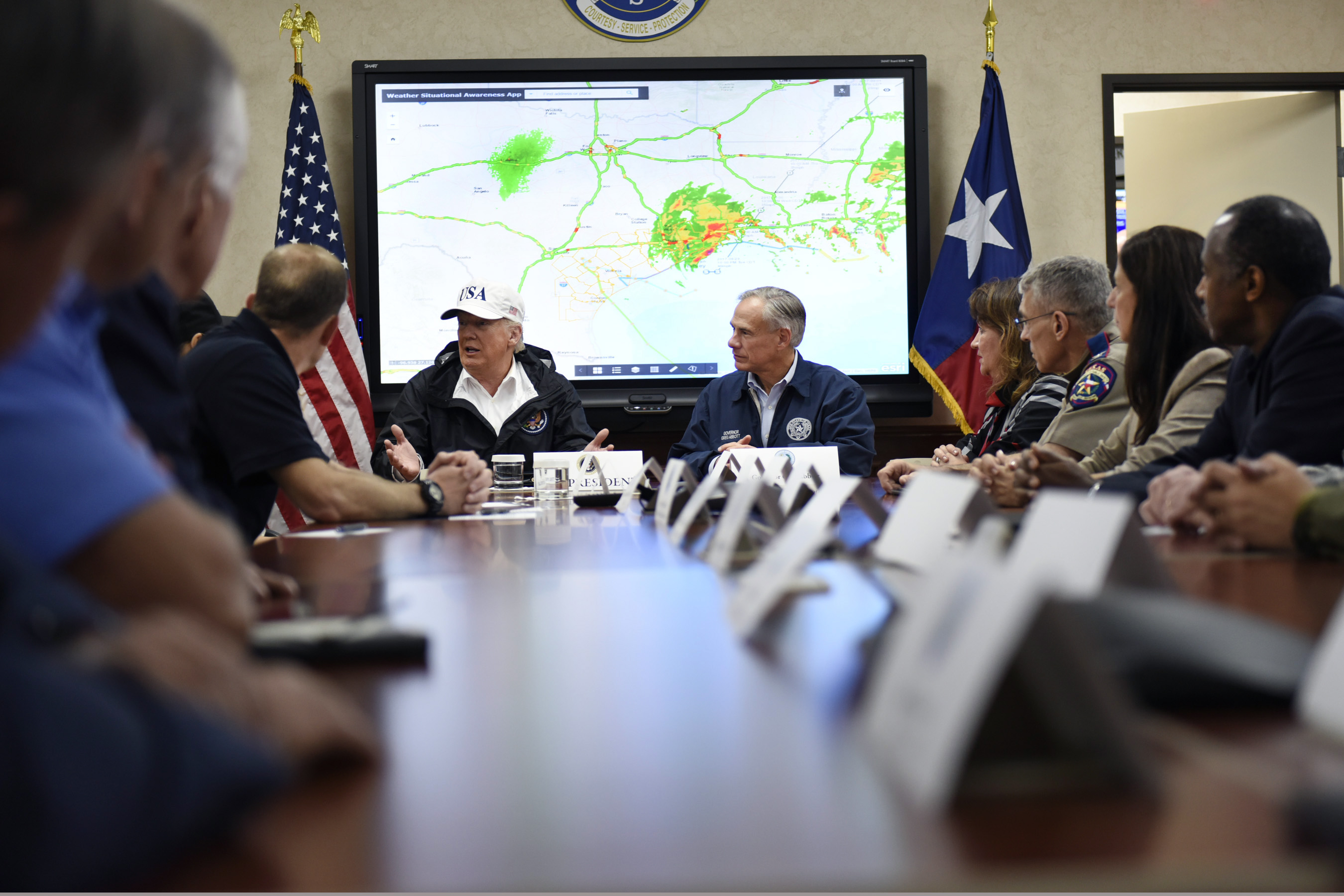
Governor Abbott with President Donald Trump during Hurricane Harvey emergency

In 2016, Abbott spoke to the Texas Public Policy Foundation, calling for a Convention of States to amend the U.S. Constitution. In his speech, he proposed the Texas Plan, a series of nine new amendments to "unravel the federal government's decades-long power grab "to impose fiscal restraints on the federal government and limit the federal government's power and jurisdiction." The plan would limit the power of the federal government and expand states' rights, allowing the states to nullify federal law under some circumstances.

On January 8, 2016, Abbott called for a national constitutional convention to address what he saw as abuses by justices of the United States Supreme Court in "abandoning the Constitution". Speaking to the Texas Public Policy Foundation, Abbott said, "We the people have to take the lead to restore the rule of law in the United States." Abbott elaborated on his proposal in a public seminar at the Hoover Institute on May 17, 2016.

=== COVID-19 pandemic ===
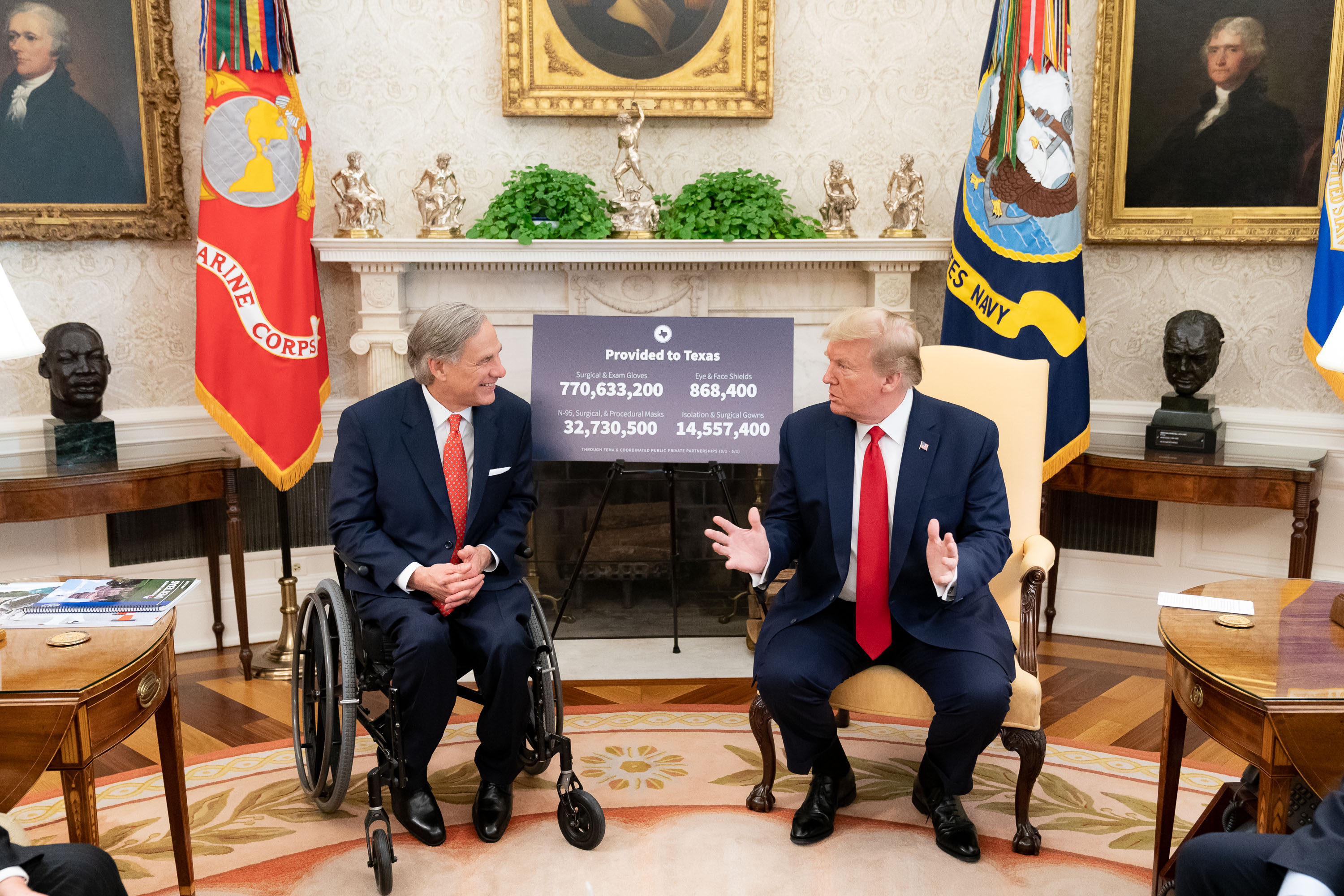
Abbott speaking with President Donald Trump and members of the White House Coronavirus Task Force in the Oval Office

During the COVID-19 pandemic, Abbott issued a stay-at-home order from April 2 to May 1, 2020. This was one of the shortest stay-at-home orders implemented by any governor. After Texas started to reopen, COVID-19 surged, leading Abbott to pause the reopening. On June 24, Texas broke its record of new COVID-19 cases in a day. Critics described Abbott's pause as a half-measure and argued that he should reverse the reopening in full to limit the virus's spread.

He said Texans should wear face masks but did not issue a statewide mandate. Abbott's response to the pandemic was criticized on both sides of the political spectrum. In July 2020, he directed counties with more than 20 COVID-19 cases to wear masks in public places after previously prohibiting local governments from mandating face masks.

In December 2020, Abbott directed Texas restaurants to ignore local curfews that had been imposed to prevent the spread of COVID-19. Localities had implemented restrictions on indoor dining and drinking late at night on New Year's weekend amid a surge in COVID-19 cases.

On March 2, 2021, Abbott lifted all COVID-19 restrictions in Texas, which included ending a mask mandate and allowing businesses to reopen "100 percent".

In April 2021, Abbott signed an executive order banning state agencies and corporations that take public funding from requiring proof of vaccination against COVID-19. In June 2021, he signed a bill that would punish businesses that require customers to have proof of COVID-19 vaccination for services.

On May 18, 2021, Abbott issued an executive order banning mask mandates in public schools and governmental entities, with a fine of up to $1,000 for failing to comply.

On August 17, 2021, Abbott's office announced that he had tested positive for COVID-19. According to his office, Abbott was "in good health and experiencing no symptoms". He received Regeneron's monoclonal antibody treatment.

Abbott emphasized personal responsibility over government restrictions, and resolutely opposed government mandates. On July 29, 2021, during an again worsening pandemic, he issued a superseding executive order (GA-38) that reinstated earlier orders and imposed additional prohibitions on local governmental officials, state agencies, public universities, and businesses doing business with the state, to prohibit them from adopting measures such as requiring face masks or proof of vaccination status as a condition of service. The order also provided for a $1,000 fine for local officials who adopted inconsistent policies. President Biden criticized Abbott for these measures. The ban on mask mandates led to a score of legal challenges between Abbott and local governments, including school districts. In August, an Abbott spokesperson said, "Private businesses don't need government running their business." In October, Abbott issued an executive order that banned any entity, including a private business, from requiring its employees to be vaccinated.

According to the Johns Hopkins University Coronavirus Resources Center, 93,390 COVID-19 deaths had been registered in Texas as of November 2024.

=== Criminal justice ===
In the wake of the George Floyd protests, Abbott called on candidates in the 2020 elections to "back the blue". After some Texas cities redirected funding from police to social services and emergency response, he threatened to seize control of local police departments. In 2021, Abbott spearheaded legislative efforts to fine cities that reduced spending on police.

In 2021, Abbott vetoed a bipartisan criminal justice bill that would have made people convicted of certain crimes before they were 18 eligible for early parole and created panels to consider inmates' age and mental health at the time of their crimes when evaluating parole eligibility. He also vetoed an animal protection bill that would have made it illegal to chain up dogs without giving them access to drinkable water and shade or shelter.

In May 2024, Abbott granted a full pardon to former Army sergeant Daniel Perry after the Texas Board of Pardons and Paroles, whose members had all been appointed by Abbott, unanimously recommended it. Perry was sentenced to 25 years in prison in 2023 after he was convicted of murdering Air Force veteran Garrett Foster during a Black Lives Matter protest. In 2023, Abbott said he would work swiftly for a pardon after a jury convicted Perry of murder.

=== Education ===
Abbott supports using government funds to help families send their children to private schools. In multiple legislative sessions he advocated a bill providing what he called "Education Savings Accounts" (ESAs). The bill repeatedly hit roadblocks in the Texas House of Representatives, where Democrats and rural Republicans believed the program would harm public school funding. When the legislation failed to pass in the 88th Regular Session, Abbott called multiple special sessions to approve it. The special sessions expired without passing the legislation.

Leading into the 2024 elections, Abbott campaigned against incumbent House Republicans who voted against his voucher program in hope of replacing them with members supportive of it. The campaign succeeded in securing a majority of House members in the 89th legislative session who supported Abbott's ESA program. House Democrats attempted to put the issue of vouchers before the voters in a referendum but failed, and the bill passed the House with near unanimous Republican support. The legislation Abbott signed in 2025 gave participating families around $10,000 to cover tuition fees and other school-related expenses.

=== Environment ===
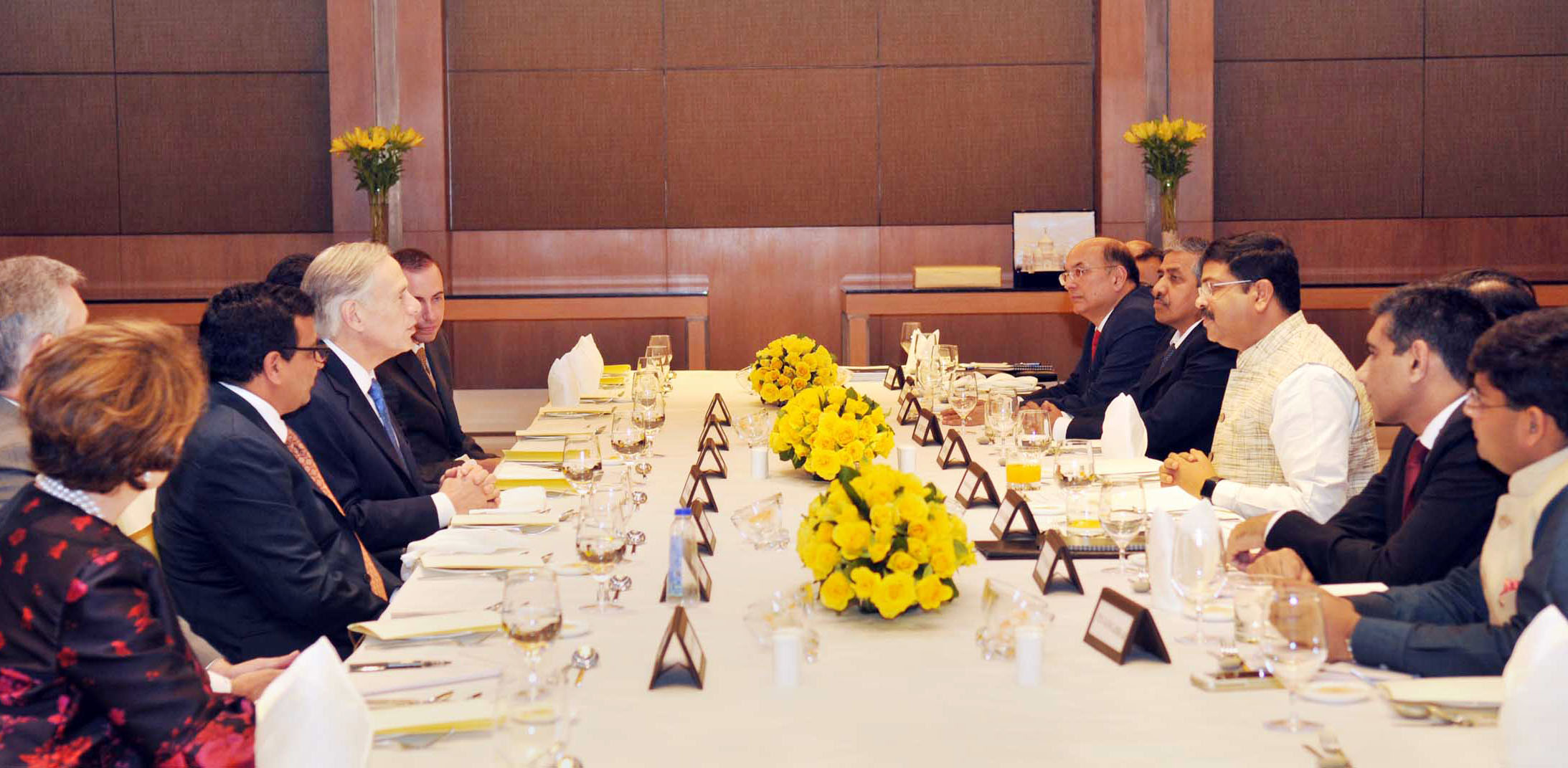
Dharmendra Pradhan, India's union minister for petroleum and natural gas and skill development and entrepreneurship in a meeting with Abbott in 2018

As of 2018, Abbott rejects the scientific consensus on climate change. He has said that the climate is changing, but does not accept the consensus that human activity is the main reason.

In early 2014, Abbott participated in sessions held at the headquarters of the United States Chamber of Commerce to devise a legal strategy to dismantle climate change regulations. In 2016, he supported Scott Pruitt's appointment as head of the Environmental Protection Agency (EPA), saying, "He and I teamed up on many lawsuits against the EPA." As Texas attorney general, Abbott often sued the federal government over environmental regulations.

After Joe Biden was elected president, Abbott vowed to pursue an aggressive legal strategy against the Biden administration's environmental regulations.

=== February 2021 North American ice storm ===
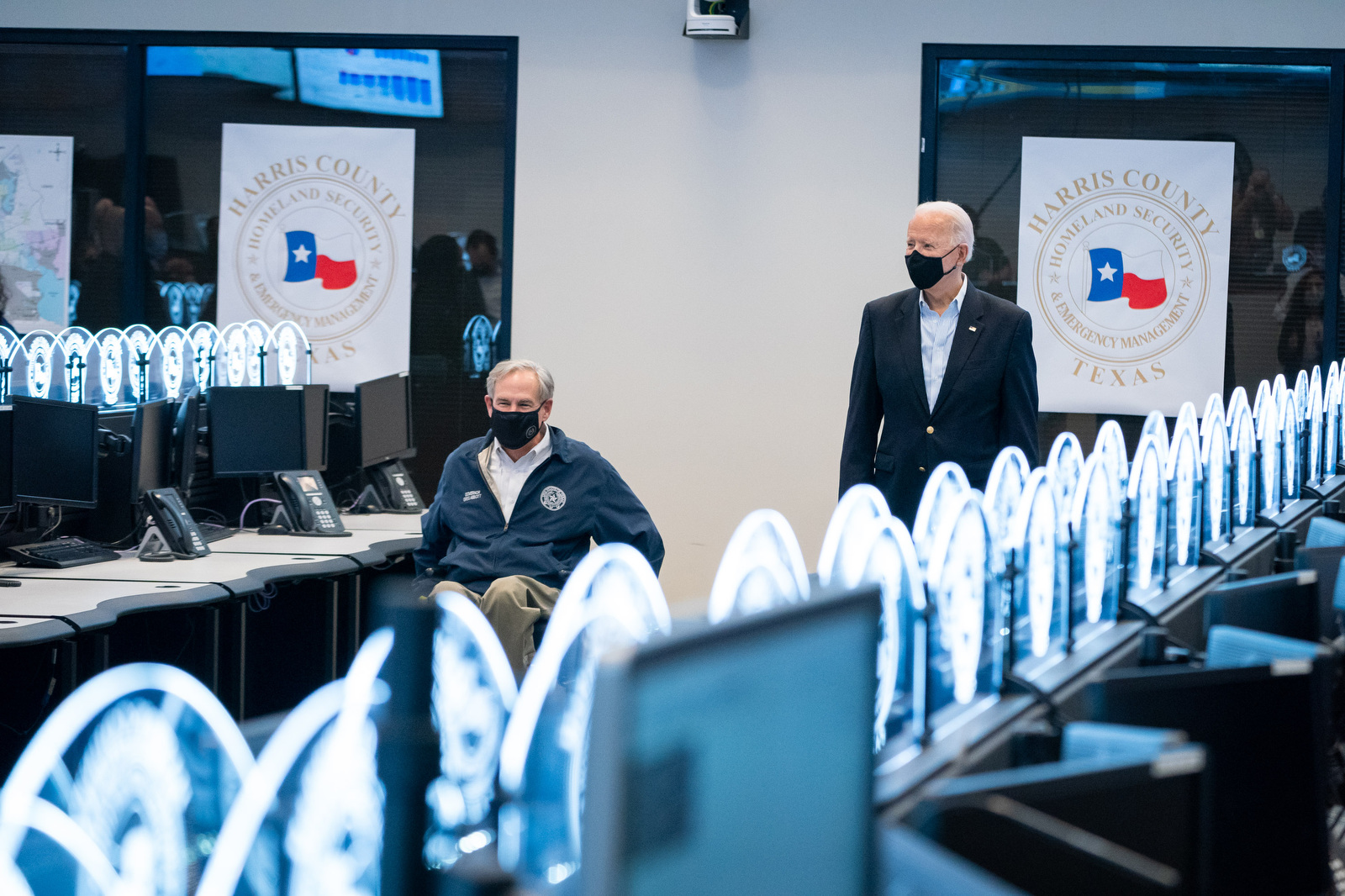
Abbott and President Joe Biden at the Harris County Emergency Operations Center in 2021

During the February 13–17, 2021 North American winter storm, power-plant failures left four million Texas households without power. Abbott called for investigation and reform of the Electric Reliability Council of Texas (ERCOT), the electric grid operator for most of Texas.

On February 16, on Hannity, Abbott said, "This shows how the Green New Deal would be a deadly deal for the United States of America ... Our wind and our solar got shut down, and they were collectively more than 10 percent of our power grid, and that thrust Texas into a situation where it was lacking power on a statewide basis... It just shows that fossil fuel is necessary." The Texas energy department clarified that failure to winterize the state's power grid had caused most of the losses. Most power plants in Texas are gas-fired, with wind generators providing about 10% during the winter.

By February 18, Abbott had ordered Texas natural gas to sell exclusively to power generators in Texas, which had an immediate and direct impact on Mexico, where gas-fired plants generate two-thirds of all energy. In June, he signed a bill requiring power companies to be more prepared for extreme weather events.

=== Firearms ===
In 2015, Abbott signed the campus carry (SB 11) and the open carry (HB 910) bills into law. The campus carry law came into effect later that year, allowing licensed carry of a concealed handgun on public college campuses, with private colleges able to opt out. The open carry bill went into effect in 2016, allowing licensed open carry of a handgun in public areas and private businesses unless they display a "30.07" sign, referring to state penal code 30.07, according to which a handgun may not be carried openly even by a licensed gun carrier. To do so is considered trespassing. Texas is the 45th state to have open carry. In 2017, Abbott signed into law a bill lowering handgun carry license fees. In 2021, he signed into law a bill that allowed Texans to carry guns without a license.

In an interview after the November 5, 2017, Sutherland Springs church shooting, Abbott urged historical reflection and the consideration that evil had been present in earlier "horrific events" during the Nazi era, the Middle Ages and biblical times. The Anti-Defamation League called his comparison of the shooting "to the victims of the Holocaust" "deeply offensive" and "insensitive".

After the 2018 Santa Fe High School shooting, Abbott said he would consult across Texas in an attempt to prevent gun violence in schools. A series of round-table discussions followed at the state capitol. In a speech at an NRA convention in Dallas about two weeks after the shooting, Abbott said, "The problem is not guns, it's hearts without God". In June 2019, he signed a bill allowing for more armed teachers, with school districts unrestricted as to the number they allow. The bill created "threat assessment teams" intended to identify potentially violent students. Although the state legislature passed measures for students services to deal with related mental health issues, proposals to adopt a red flag law failed. Abbott said such a law was "not necessary in the state of Texas".

In August 2019, a gunman who had written a racist manifesto killed 22 people in a mass shooting at a Walmart in El Paso, saying he had targeted "Mexicans". After the shooting, Abbott convened a domestic terrorism task force to look into domestic extremism but reiterated his opposition to a red-flag law and rejected calls to convene a special session of the state legislature to address gun violence.

In June 2021, Abbott signed into law a permitless carry bill allowing Texans to carry handguns without a license or training beginning in September.

On May 24, 2022, Abbott said that an 18-year-old carrying a handgun and possibly a rifle (later identified as a Daniel Defense DDM4, an AR-15 style rifle) killed 19 students and 2 teachers at Robb Elementary School in Uvalde. On May 25, Abbott held a news conference on the shooting. He said that mental health in the community was the root cause of the event. Beto O'Rourke, who was running for the Democratic nomination for governor in 2022, approached the stage and said, "The time to stop the next shooting is right now and you are doing nothing." Abbott responded that it was a time for "healing and hope" for the victims' families, not "our agendas". Rather than attend the annual NRA meeting on May 27, Abbott published a YouTube message. He said that gun laws have not been effective, noting that the shooter broke two gun laws the day he committed the multiple murders. It is a felony to possess a gun on school property, and "what he did on campus is capital murder. That's a crime that would have subjected him to the death penalty in Texas".

=== Homelessness ===
In June 2019, the city of Austin introduced an ordinance that repealed a 25-year-old ban on homeless people camping, lying, or sleeping in public. In October, Abbott sent Austin mayor Steve Adler a widely publicized letter criticizing the ordinance and threatening to deploy state resources to "combat homelessness".

In November 2019, Abbott directed the State of Texas to open a temporary homeless encampment on a former vehicle storage yard owned by the Texas Department of Transportation, which camp residents dubbed "Abbottville".

=== Immigration and border security ===
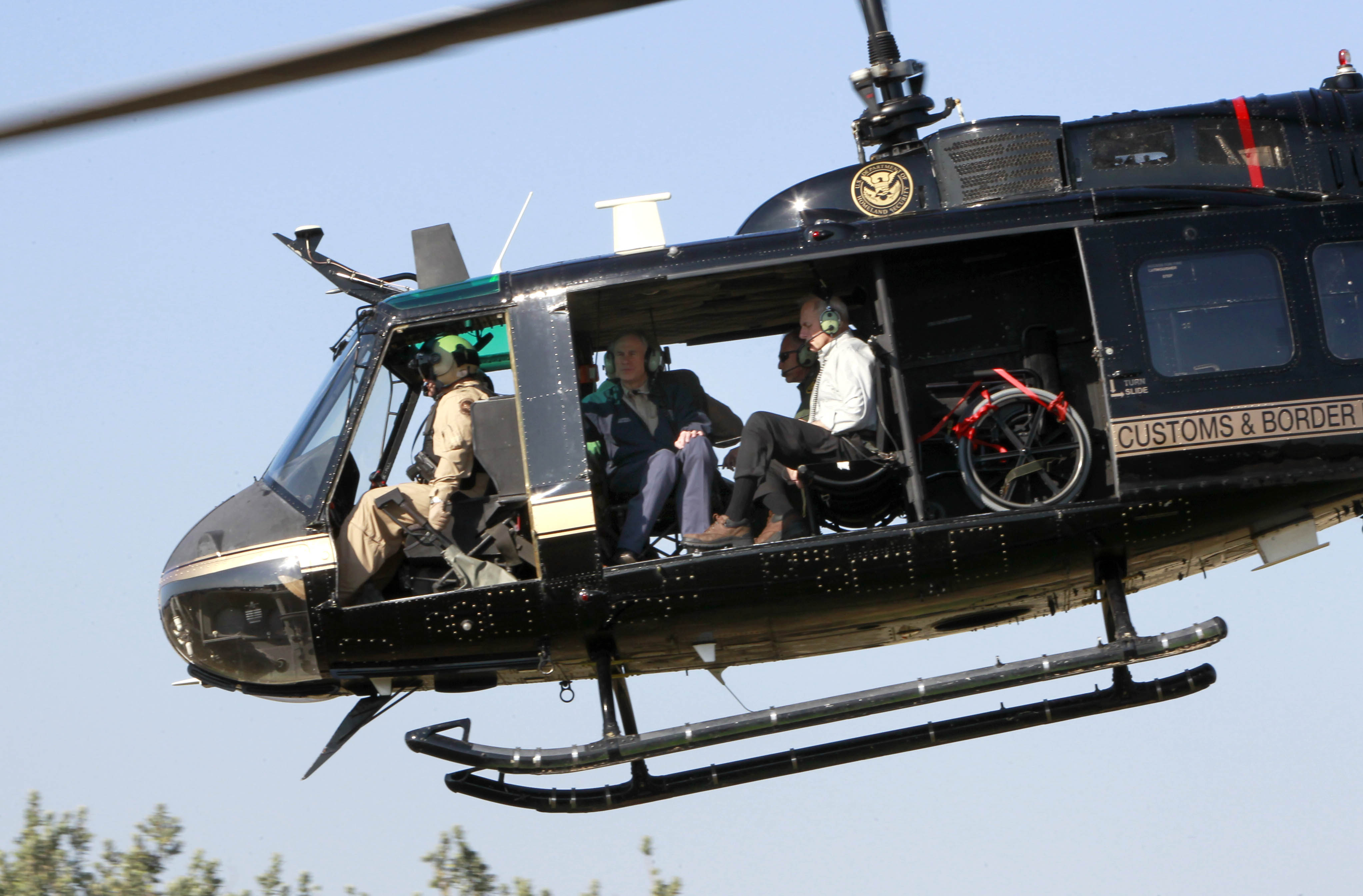
Abbott and Secretary of Homeland Security John F. Kelly in a helicopter touring the Mexico–United States border in 2017

In June 2015, Abbott signed a bill bolstering Texas's border security operations, including hiring additional state police, expanding the use of technology, and creating intelligence operations units. In November, after the Paris terrorist attack earlier that month, he announced that Texas would refuse Syrian refugees. In December, Abbott ordered the Texas Health and Human Services Commission to sue the federal government and the International Rescue Committee to block refugee settlement, but a federal district court struck the lawsuit down.

In February 2017, Abbott blocked funding to Travis County, Texas, due to its recently implemented sanctuary city policy. In May, he signed into law Texas Senate Bill 4, targeting sanctuary cities by charging county or city officials who refuse to work with federal officials and allowing police officers to check the immigration status of those they detain.

In January 2020, Abbott made Texas the first state to decline refugee resettlement under a new rule implemented by the Trump administration. In a joint statement, all sixteen Catholic bishops of Texas condemned the move.

In 2021, Abbott said that illegal immigrants were invading homes. In March, he tweeted, "The Biden Administration is recklessly releasing hundreds of illegal immigrants who have COVID into Texas communities." PolitiFact rated Abbott's claim "Mostly False", since those being released were asylum seekers with a legal right to remain in the U.S., and the number was only 108 at the time of the tweet.

In June 2021, Abbott ordered Texas child-care regulators to take the licenses of child-care facilities that housed unaccompanied migrant minors. He said that housing unaccompanied minors in child-care facilities adversely affected facilities housing Texan children in foster care. Later that month, he announced plans to build a border wall with Mexico, saying the state would provide $250 million and that direct donations from the public would be solicited.

In July 2021, Abbott advised state law enforcement officers and the National Guard to arrest illegal migrants for trespassing and signed an order restricting ground transportation of migrants. Migrants arrested under Abbott's policy were imprisoned for weeks without legal help or formal charges. By December 2023, nearly 10,000 migrants had been arrested on trespassing charges.

In September 2021, Abbott signed legislation spending nearly $2 billion on Texas's border security operations, including $750 million for border wall construction. This was a significant increase, and supplemented $1 billion already appropriated for border security in the two-year state budget. In December, Abbott announced that Texas would continue the U.S. border wall President Trump had started. The wall has the same design as Trump's and is under construction.

In April 2022, Abbott announced that Texas would increase inspections of commercial trucks entering from Mexico with the goal of seizing illegal drugs and illegal migrants. Shortly thereafter, the inspections caused a multi-mile backup of commercial vehicles carrying produce, auto parts, household goods, and other items. A spokesman for the Fresh Produce Association of the Americas said that up to 80% of perishable fruits and vegetables had been unable to cross and in some cases were in danger of spoiling. The president of the Texas Trucking Association said the delays were affecting every kind of trucking and being felt across the country. Mexican truckers blockaded several bridges in protest. Under heavy pressure from Texas business owners, who strongly criticized the "secondary inspections", Abbott canceled the policy on April 15. He said the reversal was because the governors of adjacent Mexican states had agreed to exercise stronger vigilance against human trafficking, drugs, and guns. Abbott's truck inspections cost Texas an estimated $4.2 billion and led to no apprehensions of drugs or illegal migrants.

In April 2022, Abbott announced in a press conference a plan to direct the Texas Division of Emergency Management to bus illegal immigrants with 900 charter buses from Texas to Washington, D.C, citing a potential surge of immigrants crossing the border after Title 42 provisions regarding communicable disease were set to be rolled back by President Biden the next month. Any mayor, county judge, or city could request buses for immigrants who had been released from federal custody. After initial criticism, Abbott clarified that the trip would be voluntary for immigrants. The first two buses arrived later that month. Abbott came under fire for both buses, with one American Enterprise Institute scholar suggesting he be federally prosecuted for human trafficking. Senator Ted Cruz supported Abbott's actions and advocated that more immigrants be bused into other predominantly Democratic areas. On September 15 and September 17, Abbott sent three additional buses carrying approximately 151 migrants to Vice President Kamala Harris's residence at the Naval Observatory.

In June 2023, Abbott deployed floating barriers in the Rio Grande in an effort to deter illegal border crossings. The U.S. Justice Department sued Abbott and the state of Texas after Abbott refused to remove the barriers.

In December 2023, Abbott signed three border-security-related bills into law, including a bill making illegal immigration a state crime.

=== Interstate relations ===
Abbott tweeted, "I fully authorized the President to call up 400 members of the Texas National Guard" to support the 2025 deployment of federal forces in the United States.

=== Jade Helm 15 ===
In April 2015, Abbott asked the Texas State Guard to monitor the military training exercise Jade Helm 15 amid Internet-fueled suspicions that the war simulation was really a hostile military takeover. In 2018, former CIA and NSA director Michael Hayden said Russian intelligence organizations had propagated the conspiracy theory and that Abbott's response convinced them of the power such a misinformation campaign could have in the U.S.

=== Labor unions ===
In 2024, Abbott joined five other Republican governors (Kay Ivey, Brian Kemp, Tate Reeves, Henry McMaster, and Bill Lee) in a statement opposing the United Auto Workers unionization campaign.

=== LGBTQ rights ===
In 2014, Abbott defended Texas's ban on same-sex marriage, which a federal court ruled unconstitutional. As attorney general of Texas, he argued that the prohibition on same-sex marriage incentivized that children would be born "in the context of stable, lasting relationships".

Abbott condemned Obergefell v. Hodges, the Supreme Court ruling that same-sex marriage bans are unconstitutional. He said, "the Supreme Court has abandoned its role as an impartial judicial arbiter." Shortly thereafter, Abbott filed a lawsuit to stop same-sex spouses of city employees from being covered by benefit policies.

In a letter dated May 27, 2017, the CEOs of 14 large technology companies, including Facebook, Apple Inc., Microsoft, and Amazon.com, urged Abbott not to pass what came to be known as the "bathroom bill": legislation requiring people to use the bathroom of the sex listed on their birth certificates, not the one of their choice. Abbott revived the bill and Lieutenant Governor Dan Patrick supported it. In March 2018, Byron Cook, the chairman of the House State Affairs committee who blocked the bill, claimed that Abbott privately opposed the bill. The bill was never signed; Abbott later said, "it's not on my agenda" in a debate with Lupe Valdez, the 2018 Democratic nominee for governor.

In 2017, Abbott signed legislation to allow taxpayer-funded adoption agencies to refuse same-sex families from adopting children for religious reasons.

In 2021, a Republican primary challenger criticized Abbott because Texas's child welfare agency included content regarding LGBTQ youths. Shortly thereafter, the agency, whose members Abbott appoints, removed the webpage that included a suicide prevention hotline and other resources for LGBT youths.

In 2022, Abbott instructed Texas state agencies to treat gender-affirming medical treatments (such as puberty blockers or hormone treatments) for transgender youths as child abuse.

=== Local government preemption ===
Abbott supported efforts to limit the authority of Texas cities and counties to enact local ordinances. In June 2023 he signed House Bill 2127, the Texas Regulatory Consistency Act (nicknamed the "Death Star" bill by opponents), which bars municipalities from adopting ordinances that exceed state law in eight areas, including agriculture, business and commerce, finance, labor, natural resources, and property. The Texas Tribune reported that Abbott had long sought the law and called it Texas Republicans' most expansive attempt to curtail the powers of the state's large, largely Democratic-led cities. Abbott said the law would give Texas a single regulatory regime statewide and prevent cities from micromanaging businesses.

Houston, later joined by San Antonio and El Paso, sued to block the law. A Travis County district judge ruled it unconstitutional in August 2023, though the state's appeal stayed the ruling and the law took effect on September 1. In July 2025, the Third Circuit Court of Appeals overturned that decision, finding the cities lacked standing to challenge the law.

=== Marijuana ===
In June 2019, Abbott signed into law House Bill 1325, which legalized the cultivation of industrial hemp (cannabis containing less than 0.3% THC). It also legalized possession and sale of hemp-derived CBD products without need for a doctor's approval. HB 1325 passed the Senate 31–0 and the House 140–3. An unintended consequence of the legislation was that numerous local prosecutors announced that they would stop prosecuting low-level marijuana offenses, due to a lack of testing equipment. Abbott has said that legal hemp products had to come with a "hemp certificate" and instructed the municipalities to continue enforcing marijuana laws.

In 2022, a poll of Texas voters found that 55% of Texans either support or strongly support legalizing cannabis.

After the enactment of HB 1325, the sale of consumable hemp products exploded in the state, including the sale products containing delta-8-THC. In 2025, the legislature passed SB 3, which would have completely banned the sale of THC products in the state. Abbott vetoed the bill after public outcry, which put him at odds with Lieutenant Governor Patrick, the primary advocate for a complete ban. In explaining his veto, Abbott said the complete ban went too far and could face legal challenges. Instead of a full ban, he pushed for "regulation" including restrictions on the age of consumers, time of purchase, and testing requirements similar to those in the alcohol industry. Abbott included the issue of THC regulation in the two special legislative sessions he called over the summer of 2025, but due to continued disagreement with Patrick, comprehensive legislation on the issue failed to pass.

On September 10, 2025, Abbott issued an executive order directing the Department of State Health Services (DSHS) and the Texas Alcoholic Beverage Commission (TABC) to develop rules, regulations, and oversight of THC products. These included a prohibition on sales of the product to anyone under 21 and requiring a government-issued ID to purchase it.

=== Religion ===
In 2015, Abbott signed the Pastor Protection Act, which allows members of the clergy to refuse to officiate at same-sex weddings if they feel doing so violates their beliefs.

In 2017, Abbott signed into law Senate Bill 24, preventing state or local governments from subpoenaing pastors' sermons. The bill was inspired by an anti-discrimination ordinance in Houston, where five pastors' sermons were subpoenaed.

Also in 2017, Abbott signed House Bill 3859, which allows faith-based groups working with the Texas child welfare system to deny services "under circumstances that conflict with the provider's sincerely held religious beliefs." Democrats and civil rights advocates said the adoption bill could allow such groups to discriminate against those who practice a different religion or who are lesbian, gay, bisexual, or transgender, and LGBT rights groups said they would challenge the bill in court. In response, California added Texas to a list of states to which it banned official government travel.

In 2025, Abbott signed Texas Senate Bill 10, which requires all public schools to display the Ten Commandments in their classrooms. A federal court blocked a similar law in Louisiana the previous day.

In November 2025, Abbott declared the Muslim Brotherhood and the Council on American–Islamic Relations (CAIR) "foreign terrorist organizations and transnational criminal organizations". He also called for an investigation of so-called "sharia courts", saying, "The Constitution's religious protections provide no authority for religious courts to skirt state and federal laws simply by donning robes and pronouncing positions inconsistent with western civilization".

=== Voting rights ===
Abbott pressed for a purge of nearly 100,000 registered voters from Texas voter rolls. Texas officials initially claimed that the voters to be purged were not U.S. citizens. The purge was canceled in April 2018 after voting rights groups challenged it, and officials at the Office of the Texas Secretary of State admitted that tens of thousands of legal voters (naturalized citizens) were wrongly flagged for removal. Abbott claimed that he played no role in the voter purge, but emails released in June 2019 showed he was the driving force behind the effort.

In September 2020, Abbott issued a proclamation that each Texas county could have only one location where voters could drop off early voting ballots. He said that would prevent "illegal voting" but cited no examples of voter fraud. Election security experts say voter fraud is extremely rare. Also in September 2020, Abbott extended the early voting period for that year's general election due to COVID-19; the Republican Party of Texas opposed his decision.

Abbott made "election integrity" a legislative priority after President Trump's failed attempts to overturn the election results of 2020 United States presidential election by using baseless claims that the results were fraudulent. Voting rights advocates and civil rights groups denounced the resulting legislation, saying it disproportionately affected voters of color and people with disabilities.

In July 2021, Democratic lawmakers in the Texas legislature fled the state on a chartered flight to Washington, D.C., in an effort to block the passage of a bill that would reform the state election procedures. Abbott threatened to have the lawmakers arrested upon their return to Texas. In August, the Supreme Court of Texas made a ruling allowing for the arrest of the absent lawmakers, so they could be brought to the state capitol.

In October 2021, Abbott appointed John Scott as Texas secretary of state, putting him in a position to oversee Texas elections. Scott aided Trump in his failed efforts to throw out election results in the 2020 presidential election.

== Personal life ==
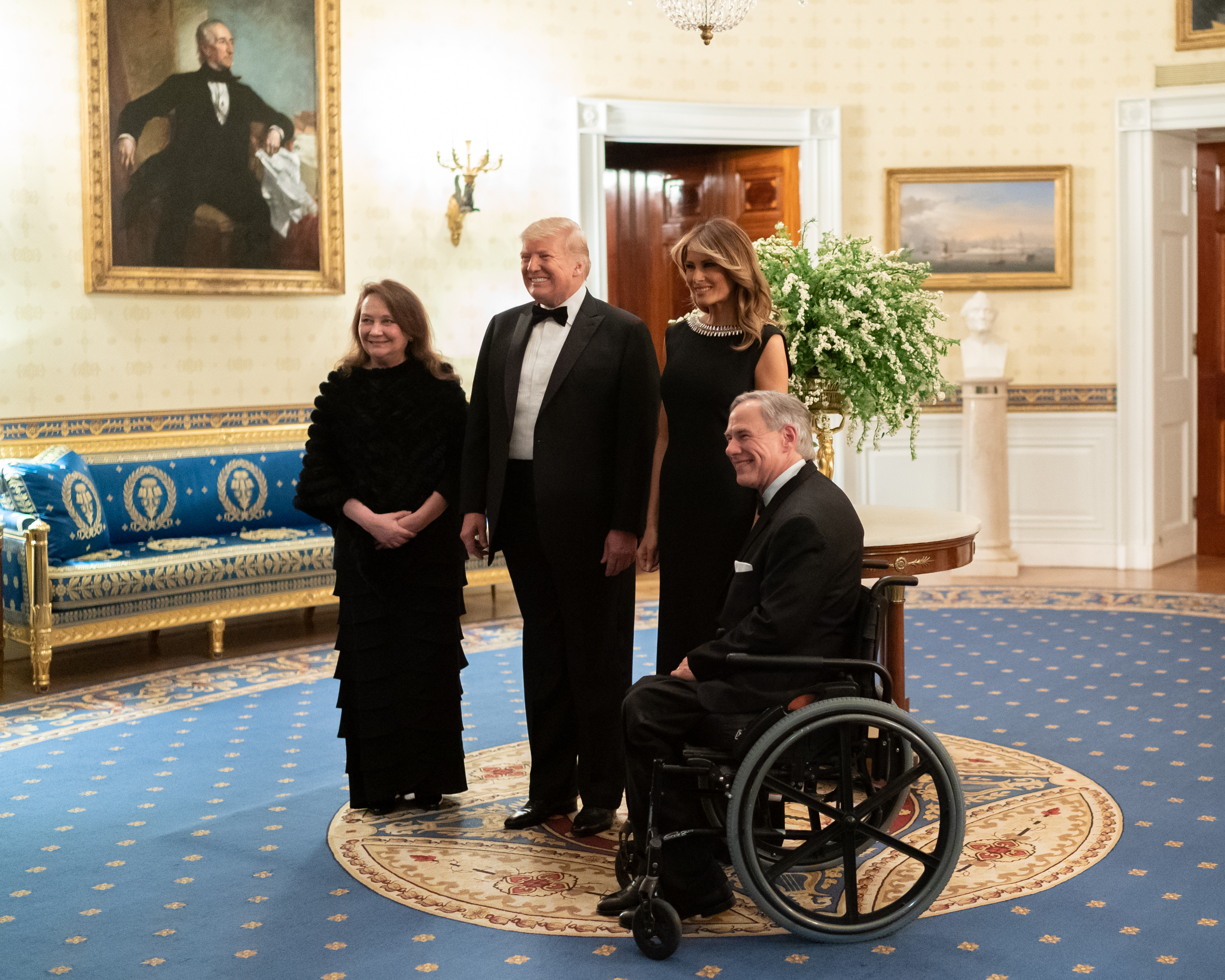
Abbott (far right) and his wife Cecilia (far left) with President Donald Trump and First Lady Melania Trump in 2020

Abbott is Catholic, and is married to Cecilia Phalen Abbott, a granddaughter of Mexican immigrants. They were married in San Antonio in 1981. His election as governor of Texas made her the first Latina to be First Lady of Texas since Texas joined the union. They have one adopted daughter. Cecilia is a former schoolteacher and principal.

=== Wheelchair use ===
On July 14, 1984, at age 26, Abbott was paralyzed below the waist when an oak tree fell on him while he was jogging in River Oaks, Houston, after a storm. Two steel rods were implanted in his spine, and he underwent extensive rehabilitation at TIRR Memorial Hermann in Houston and has used a wheelchair ever since. He sued the homeowner and a tree service company, resulting in an insurance settlement that provided him with lump sum payments every three years until 2022 along with monthly payments for life, both of which were adjusted for inflation. As of August 2013, the monthly payment was US$14,000 and the three-year lump sum payment was US$400,000, all tax-free. Abbott has said he relied on the money to pay for nearly three decades of medical expenses and other costs.

== Electoral history ==
2026 Texas gubernatorial election
Party	Candidate	Votes	%
Democratic	Gina Hinojosa	5,230,789	52.8
Republican	Greg Abbott (incumbent)	4,524,527	45.7
Libertarian	Pat Dixon	148,078	1.5

2022 Texas gubernatorial election
Party	Candidate	Votes	%
Republican	Greg Abbott (incumbent)	4,437,099	54.8
Democratic	Beto O'Rourke	3,553,656	43.9
Libertarian	Mark Tippets	44,805	1.0
Green	Delilah Barrios	28,584	0.3
Total votes		8,064,144	100.0
Republican hold			

2018 Texas gubernatorial election
Party	Candidate	Votes	%
Republican	Greg Abbott (incumbent)	4,656,196	55.8
Democratic	Lupe Valdez	3,546,615	42.5
Libertarian	Mark Tippets	140,632	1.7
Total votes		8,343,443	100.0
Republican hold			

2014 Texas gubernatorial election
Party	Candidate	Votes	%
Republican	Greg Abbott	2,790,227	59.3
Democratic	Wendy Davis	1,832,254	38.9
Libertarian	Kathie Glass	66,413	1.1
Green	Brandon Parmer	18,494	0.4
Independent	Sarah M. Pavitt	1,168	<0.1
Total votes		4,708,556	100.0
Republican hold			

2010 Texas Attorney General election
Party	Candidate	Votes	%
Republican	Greg Abbott (incumbent)	3,151,064	64.1
Democratic	Barbara Ann Radnofsky	1,655,859	33.7
Libertarian	Jon Roland	112,118	2.3
Total votes		4,919,041	100.0
Republican hold			

2006 Texas Attorney General election
Party	Candidate	Votes	%
Republican	Greg Abbott (incumbent)	2,556,063	59.5
Democratic	David Van Os	1,599,069	37.2
Libertarian	Jon Roland	139,668	3.3
Total votes		4,294,800	100.0
Republican hold			

2002 Texas Attorney General election
Party	Candidate	Votes	%
Republican	Greg Abbott	2,542,184	56.7
Democratic	Kirk Watson	1,841,359	41.1
Libertarian	Jon Roland	56,880	1.3
Green	David Keith Cobb	41,560	0.9
Total votes		4,481,983	100.0
Republican hold			

1998 Texas Supreme Court Associate Justice election
Party	Candidate	Votes	%
Republican	Greg Abbott	2,104,828	60.1
Democratic	David Van Os	1,396,924	39.9
Total votes		3,501,752	100.0
Republican hold			

Legal offices
Preceded by Jack Hightower	Associate Justice of the Texas Supreme Court; 1995–2001	Succeeded by Xavier Rodriguez
Preceded by John Cornyn	Attorney General of Texas; 2002–2015	Succeeded by Ken Paxton
Party political offices
Preceded by John Cornyn	Republican nominee for Attorney General of Texas; 2002, 2006, 2010	Succeeded by Ken Paxton
Preceded by Rick Perry	Republican nominee for Governor of Texas; 2014, 2018, 2022, 2026	Most recent
Preceded by Pete Ricketts	Chair of the Republican Governors Association; 2019–2020	Succeeded by Doug Ducey
Political offices
Preceded by Rick Perry	Governor of Texas; 2015–present	Incumbent
U.S. order of precedence (ceremonial)
Preceded by JD Vance as Vice President	Order of precedence of the United States; Within Texas	Succeeded by Mayor of city in which event is held
Preceded by JD Vance as Vice President	Order of precedence of the United States; Within Texas	Succeeded by Otherwise Mike Johnson as Speaker of the House
Preceded by Ron DeSantis as Governor of Florida	Order of precedence of the United States; Outside Texas	Succeeded by Kim Reynolds as Governor of Iowa
