= Crabill =

Crabill is a surname, derived from the German Krähenbühl.

Notable people with the name Crabill include:

- A. J. Crabill (born 1979), American education reform advocate
- Norman L. Crabill (1926–2024), American NASA engineer
