= Michael L. Williams =

American lawyer (born 1953)

Michael Lawrence Williams
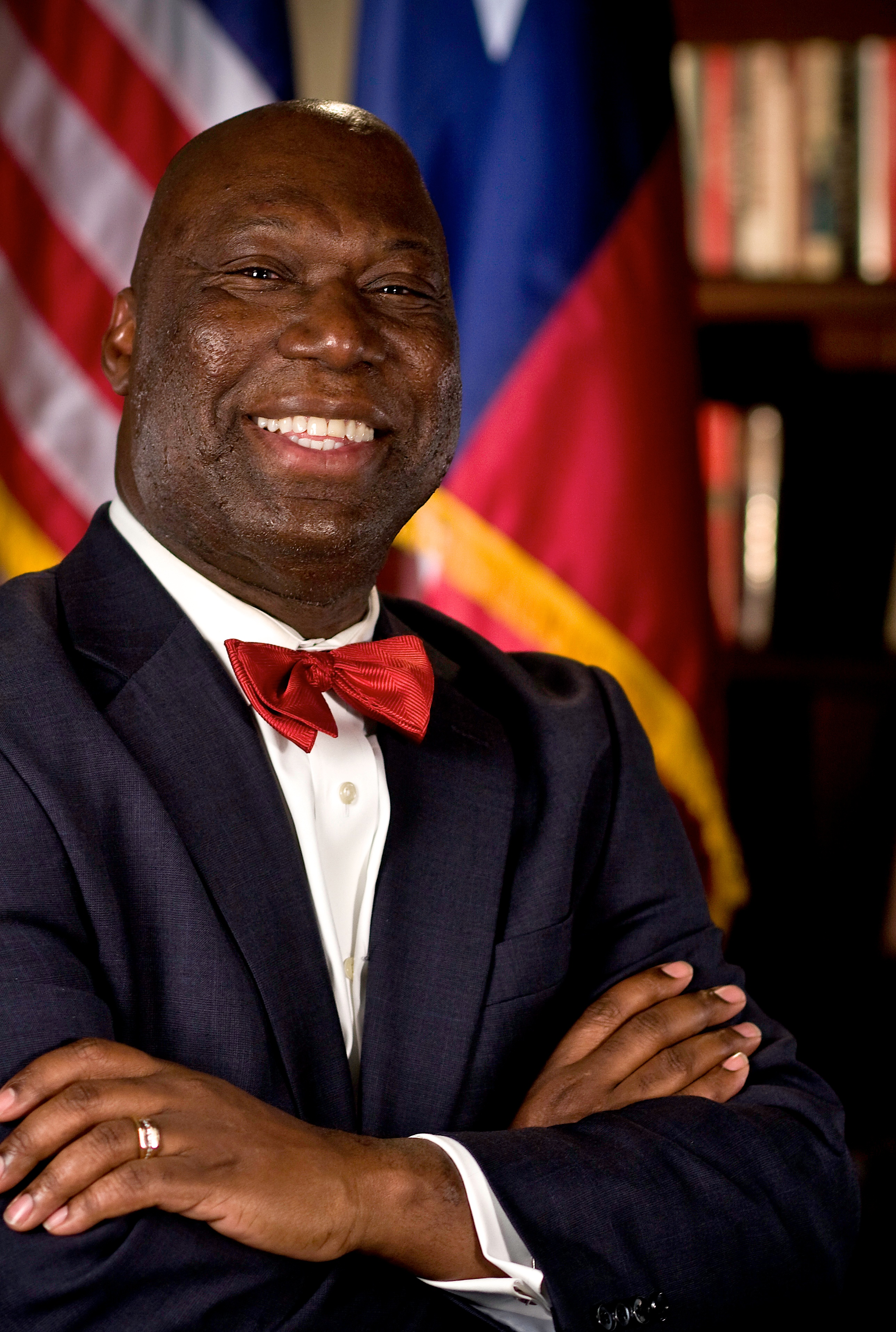
- Williams in 2009

Commissioner of the Texas Education Agency
- In office August 27, 2012 – December 31, 2015
- Governor: Rick Perry; Greg Abbott
- Preceded by: Robert Scott
- Succeeded by: Mike Morath

Railroad Commissioner of Texas
- In office January 3, 1999 – March 31, 2011
- Governor: George W. Bush; Rick Perry
- Preceded by: Carole Keeton Strayhorn
- Succeeded by: Barry T. Smitherman

Assistant Secretary of Education for the Office for Civil Rights
- In office 1990–1993
- President: George H. W. Bush
- Preceded by: LeGree S. Daniels
- Succeeded by: Norma V. Cantu

Deputy Assistant Secretary of the Treasury for Law Enforcement
- In office 1989–1990
- President: George H. W. Bush
- Preceded by: Gerald L. Hilsher
- Succeeded by: Nancy L. Worthington

Personal details
- Born: May 31, 1953 (age 73) Midland, Texas, U.S.
- Party: Republican
- Spouse: Donna Nelson
- Education: University of Southern California (BA, MPA, JD)
- Profession: Lawyer, Politician

Michael Lawrence Williams (born May 31, 1953) is an American educator and attorney who served as the commissioner of the Texas Education Agency from 2012 to 2015. A member of the Republican Party, he served as a member of the Texas Railroad Commission from 1999 to 2011.

Williams is also a former member of the elected Texas Railroad Commission, a regulatory body that oversees the oil and natural gas industries. He is the first African American to hold a statewide elected executive office in Texas history. He was appointed to the commission by then-Governor George W. Bush in 1999, and won elections in 2000, 2002, and 2008 to retain the office before eventually resigning in 2011. He is one of six African Americans to hold statewide office such as Louis Sturns, Morris Overstreet, Wallace B. Jefferson, Dale Wainwright and Jesse McClure. Williams is also the fourth African American to be elected to statewide office overall, following Overstreet, Jefferson and Wainwright.

On May 29, 2012, Williams ran unsuccessfully in the Republican primary for the redrawn 25th congressional district seat that stretches southward from Tarrant to Hays counties.

== Career ==
Williams was a federal prosecutor from 1984 to 1988 and a former assistant district attorney in his hometown of Midland, Texas. He also served as Special Assistant to Attorney General Richard Thornburgh at the United States Department of Justice from January 1988 to June 1989. In 1988, former U.S. Attorney General Edwin Meese awarded Williams the Attorney General's "Special Achievement Award" for the conviction of six Ku Klux Klan members on federal weapons charges.

Williams served as Deputy Assistant Secretary for Law Enforcement at the United States Department of the Treasury. In that capacity, he had oversight responsibility for the Federal Law Enforcement Training Center, the U.S. Secret Service, the U.S. Customs Service, the Bureau of Alcohol, Tobacco and Firearms and the Financial Crimes Enforcement Network (August 1989 – June 1990). In 1990, U.S. President George Herbert Walker Bush appointed Williams to be Assistant Secretary of Education for Civil Rights (the Office for Civil Rights) at the United States Department of Education, a post previously held by Clarence Thomas. Williams has also served as general counsel to Wilkins Group, Inc., a telecommunications company based in Richardson, Texas.

Williams is the first African-American to hold a statewide elected executive office in Texas history. Williams was appointed to the Texas Railroad Commission, a regulatory body that oversees the oil and natural gas industries, by then-Governor George W. Bush in 1999; he and won elections in 2000, 2002, and 2008 to retain the office before eventually resigning in 2011. He is also the fourth African American to be elected to statewide office overall, following Morris Overstreet, Wallace B. Jefferson, and Dale Wainwright. Williams chaired the Texas Railroad Commission from September 1999 to September 2003, and again from June 2007 to February 2009. Williams also chaired the Governor's Clean Coal Technology Council, and represented the governor and the Railroad Commission of Texas on the Southern States Energy Board. On September 14, 2005, Texas Governor Rick Perry designated Williams to lead the state's long-term Hurricane Katrina relief efforts. Williams was also the Railroad Commission's "point person" for agency regulatory reform and technology modernization efforts.

Williams was appointed Texas Education Commissioner on August 27, 2012 by then Governor Rick Perry; he became the first African-American Commissioner of Education in Texas history. On October 15, 2015, Williams announced that he would step down as Education Commissioner at the end of the year to return to the private sector. The 200-mile one-way commute from his home in Arlington to the state capital in Austin had become too taxing to remain in the position, Williams said. Perry's successor, Governor Greg Abbott, named Mike Morath as Williams' successor in the position.

=== Political campaigns and activities ===
Williams addressed the 2004 Republican National Convention, at which he endorsed the reelection of President George W. Bush. He also spoke at the 2008 Republican National Conventionin Minneapolis, Minnesota, where he endorsed the party nominee, U.S. Senator John McCain of Arizona, for president.

In 2000, Williams won a two-year unexpired term on the Railroad Commission without Democratic opposition. He defeated the Libertarian Anthony Garcia and the Green Party candidate, Charles L. Mauch. Williams received 3,600,967 votes (77 percent) to Garcia's 740,340 ballots (15.8 percent) and Mauch's 334,706 votes (7.2 percent).

In 2002, Williams won a full six-year term on the Commission. He polled 2,407,036 votes (54.8 percent) to 1,821,751 (41.5 percent) for Democrat Sherry Boyles. Two other candidates received a total of 162,482 votes (4.7 percent).

Williams ran for re-election for a second full six-year term to the Texas Railroad Commission in November 2008. He won the Republican nomination in March 2008 in an unopposed contest. Williams was re-elected with 52 percent of the vote, having defeated the Democratic candidate, Mark Thompson, and Libertarian candidate David Floyd.

Williams' effective use of social media tools earned him a Texas Social Media Award.

=== Electoral History ===
2000 Texas Railroad Commissioner Election (unexpired term)
Party	Candidate	Votes	%
Republican	Michael L. Williams (incumbent)	3,600,967	77.01
Libertarian	Anthony Garcia	740,340	15.83
Green	Charles L. Mauch	334,706	7.16
Total votes		4,676,013	100.00
Republican hold			

2002 Texas Railroad Commissioner Election
Party	Candidate	Votes	%
Republican	Michael L. Williams (incumbent)	2,407,036	54.81
Democratic	Sherry Boyles	1,821,751	41.49
Libertarian	Nazirite R. Flores Perez	110,160	2.51
Green	Charles L. Mauch	52,322	1.19
Total votes		4,391,269	100.00
Republican hold			

2008 Texas Railroad Commissioner election
Party	Candidate	Votes	%
Republican	Michael L. Williams (incumbent)	4,003,789	52.13
Democratic	Mark Thompson	3,406,174	44.35
Libertarian	David Floyd	270,078	3.52
Total votes		7,680,041	100.00
Republican hold			

==== 2012 Congressional race ====
On, December 16, 2008 Michael Williams announced via Twitter that he would seek a position in the United States Senate, noting the possibility of a special election in 2009 or 2010 to replace sitting U.S. Senator Kay Bailey Hutchison, who was challenging Texas Gov. Rick Perry in a 2010 Republican primary. Hutchison, however, did not resign her Senate seat even after losing the primary. On January 13, 2011, Hutchison announced that she would not run for re-election in 2012. In July 2011, Williams decided not to run for the Senate, but to seek the new 25th Congressional district seat. Williams finished fifth among twelve candidates in the House primary, having polled 5,387 votes (10.5 percent). The leading candidate, Roger Williams, with 12,888 votes (25.1 percent), then won the party runoff and the general election.

== Personal life ==
Williams is a 1971 graduate of Robert E. Lee High School in Midland. He is the son of public school teachers. He earned bachelor's and master's degrees from the University of Southern California in Los Angeles. He also obtained his Juris Doctor degree from the USC Law School in Los Angeles. He is married to Donna Williams, who resides in Arlington, Texas. He is a brother of the University of Texas chapter of Sigma Phi Epsilon.

Williams is a past Honorary State Chairman of Big Brothers Big Sisters of Texas, which helps to enrich, encourage, and empower children through safe, positive, one-to-one mentoring relationships. He also has served in a volunteer capacity as the general counsel of the Republican Party of Texas, the chairman of the Texas Juvenile Probation Commission and on the board of directors of the Arlington Chamber of Commerce, the Texas Public Policy Foundation, and Our Mother of Mercy Catholic School.

Preceded by Carole Keeton Strayhorn	Texas Railroad Commissioner; 1999–2011	Succeeded by Barry Smitherman
Preceded by Robert Scott	Commissioner of the Texas Education Agency; 2012–2015	Succeeded by Mike Morath
