= 2004 Republican National Convention =

U.S. political event held in New York

- 2004 presidential election

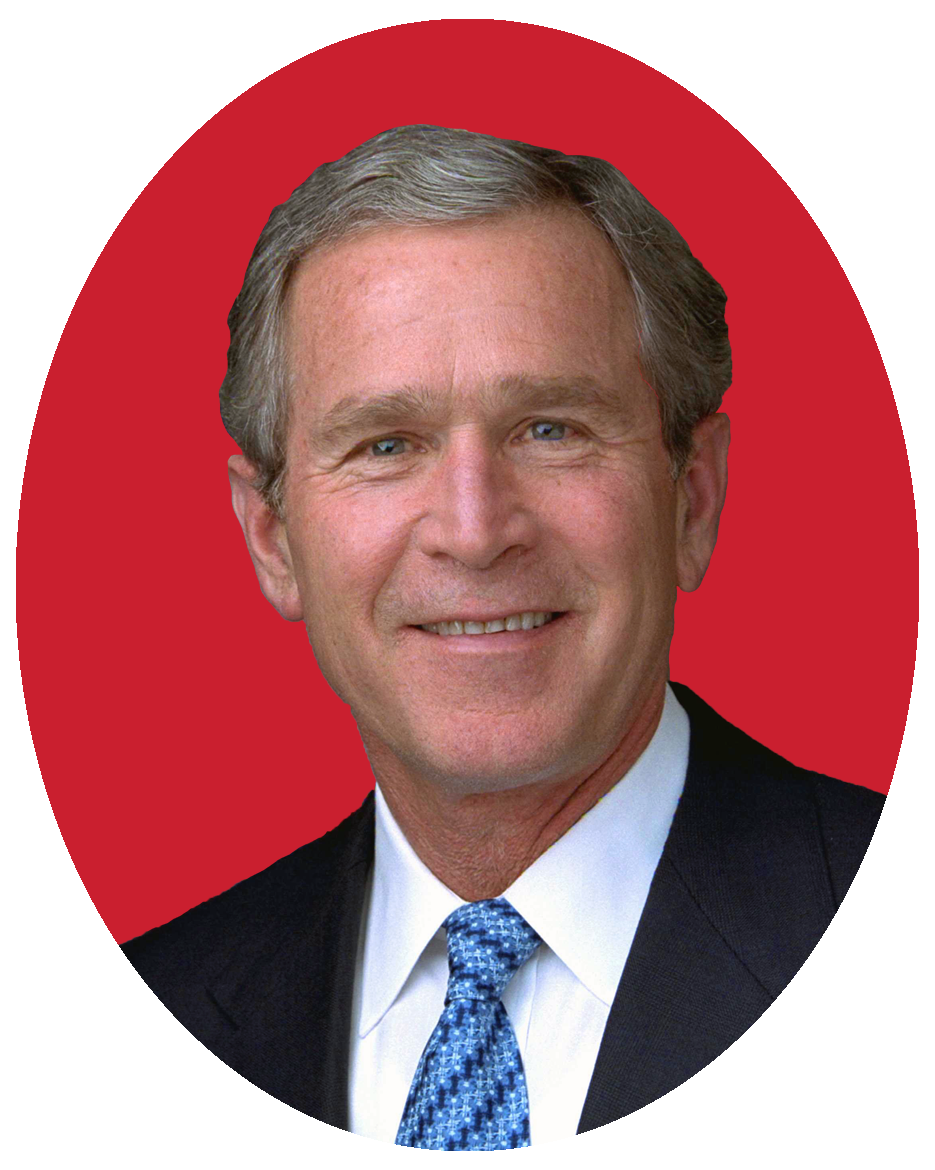
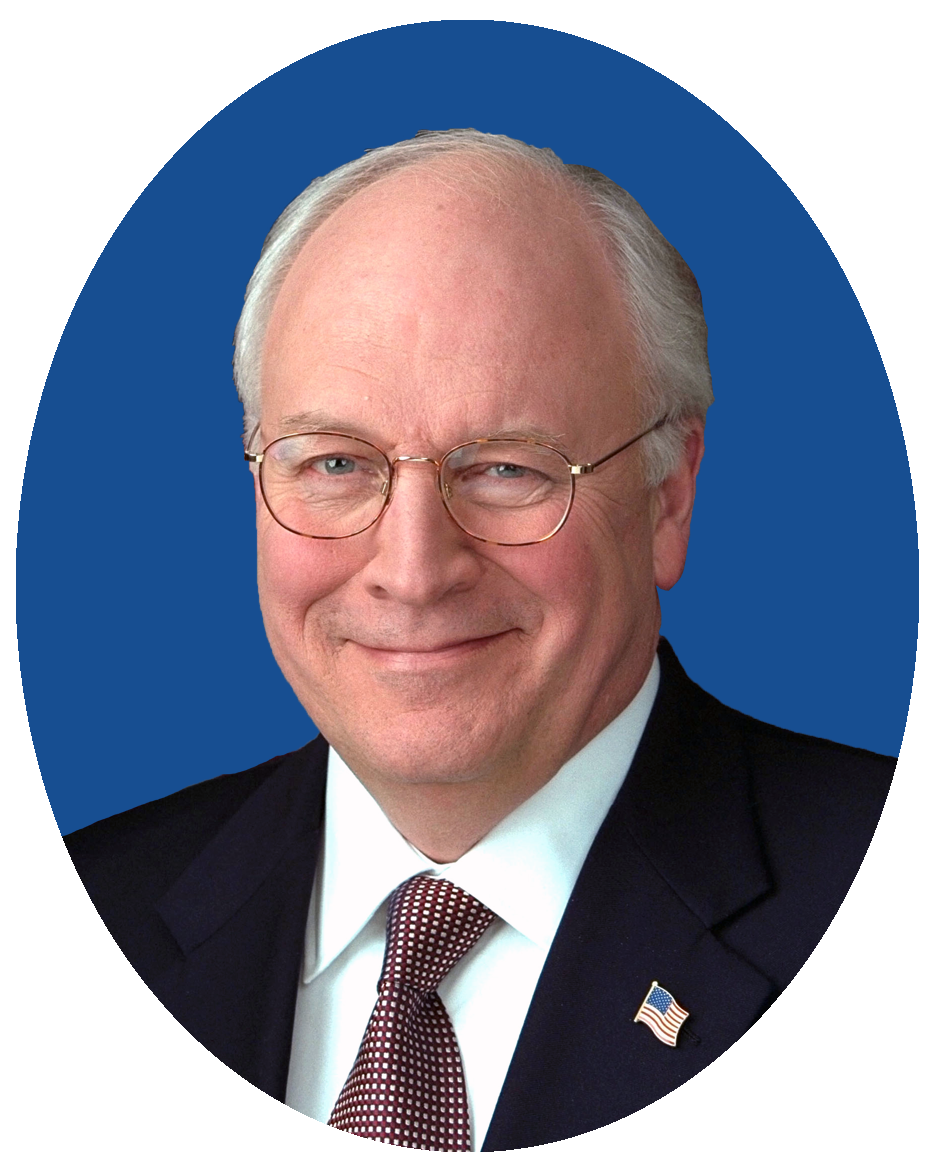
- Nominees; Bush and Cheney

Convention
- Dates: August 30 – September 2, 2004
- City: New York, New York
- Venue: Madison Square Garden
- Keynote speaker: Zell Miller

Candidates
- Presidential nominee: George W. Bush of Texas
- Vice-presidential nominee: Dick Cheney of Wyoming

Voting
- Total delegates: 2,509
- Votes needed for nomination: 1,255
- Results (president): Bush (TX): 2,508 (99.96%); Abstention: 1 (0.04%)
- Results (vice president): Cheney (WY): 100% (Acclamation)
- Ballots: 1

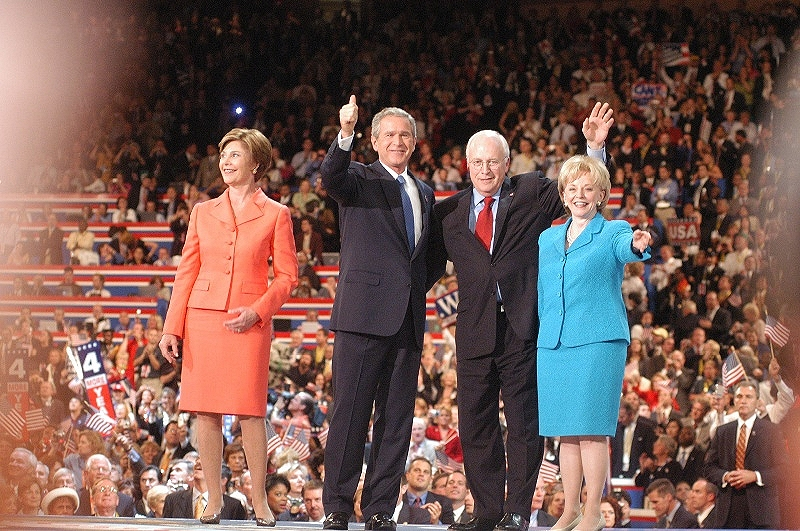
Laura and George W. Bush with Dick and Lynne Cheney during the convention

The 2004 Republican National Convention took place from August 30 to September 2, 2004, at Madison Square Garden in New York City, New York. The convention is one of a series of historic quadrennial meetings at which the Republican candidates for president and vice president, and party platform are formally adopted. Attendance included 2,509 delegates and 2,344 alternate delegates from the states, territories and the District of Columbia. The convention marked the formal end of the active primary election season. As of 2026, it is the most recent major-party nominating convention, as well as the only Republican National Convention, to be held in New York City.

The theme of the convention was "Fulfilling America's Promise by Building a Safer World and a More Hopeful America." Defining moments of the 2004 Republican National Convention include a featured keynote address by Zell Miller and the confirmation of the nomination of President George W. Bush and Vice President Dick Cheney for reelection. Bush and Cheney went on to defeat the Democratic Party's ticket of John Kerry and John Edwards in the 2004 presidential election.

== Platform ==
Apart from nominating a candidate for president and vice president, the 2004 Republican National Convention was also charged with crafting an official party platform and political agenda for the next four years. At the helm of the Platform Committee was United States Senator and Senate Majority Leader Bill Frist of Tennessee, Congresswoman Melissa Hart of Pennsylvania and Colorado Governor Bill Owens. The committee worked with the Bush campaign to develop the draft platform.

The platform adopted by the 2004 Republican National Convention was the longest in the party's history compared to the mere 1,000-word platform adopted at the first convention in 1856. At 48,000 words, it was twice the length of the one adopted at the 2004 Democratic National Convention which was only 19,500 words.

== Venue ==
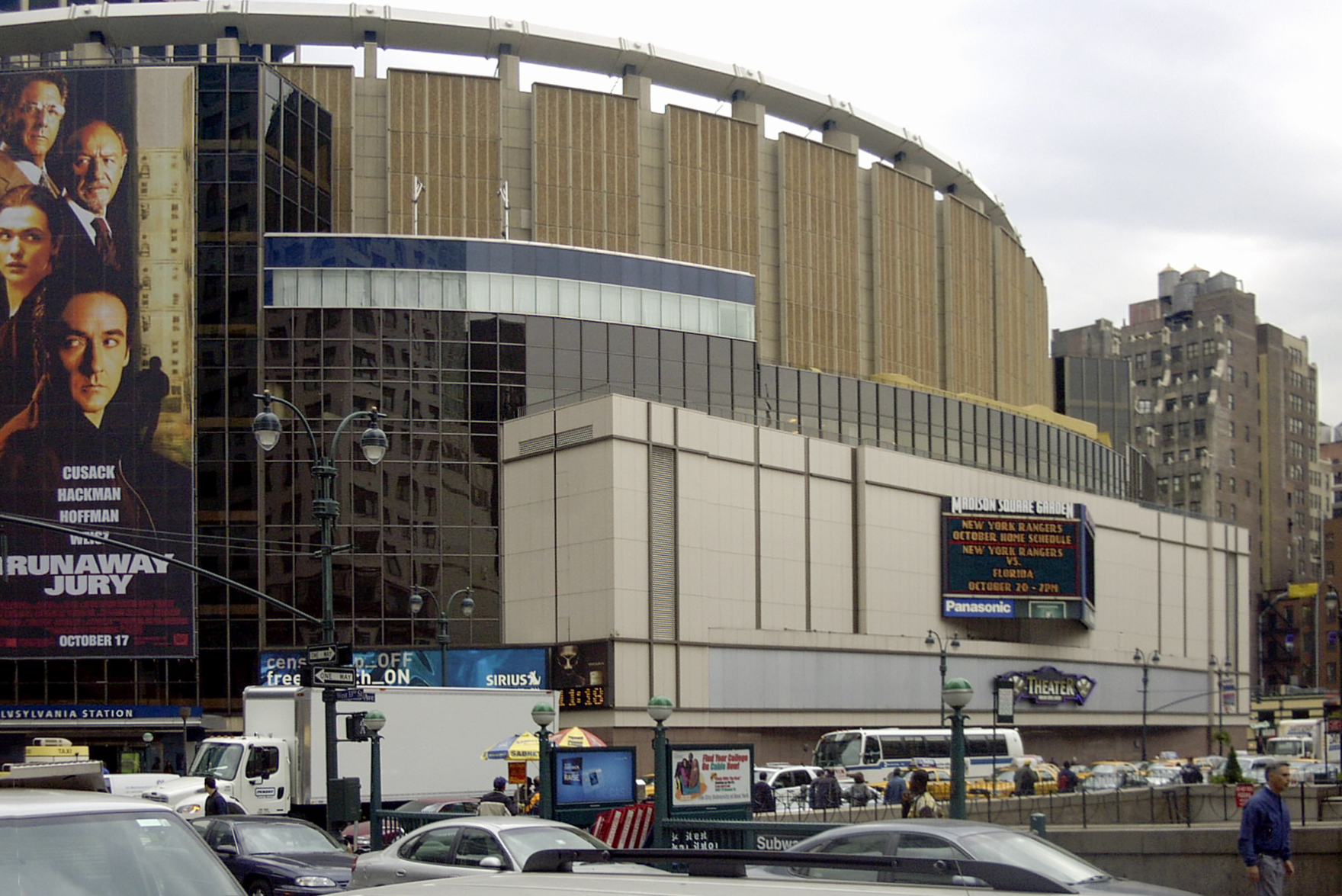
Madison Square Garden

The choice of Madison Square Garden on January 31, 2003, by all 165 members of the Republican National Committee as the venue for the 2004 Republican National Convention meant that New York City would host a major Republican nominating convention for the first time in its history. On July 19, control of Madison Square Garden was officially handed over to the Republican Party under the administration of chief executive officer of the convention, Bill Harris. Mayor Michael Bloomberg thanked the party for their choice, for which he had vigorously lobbied, noting it as a significant display of support for the city and an economic boom.

Until Chicago, Illinois was selected as the host of the 2024 Democratic National Convention, 2004 was the last time that for either major party that they chose to hold their convention in a state that was not considered to be a swing state (the Democrats held their 2004 convention in Boston, Massachusetts).

=== Security ===
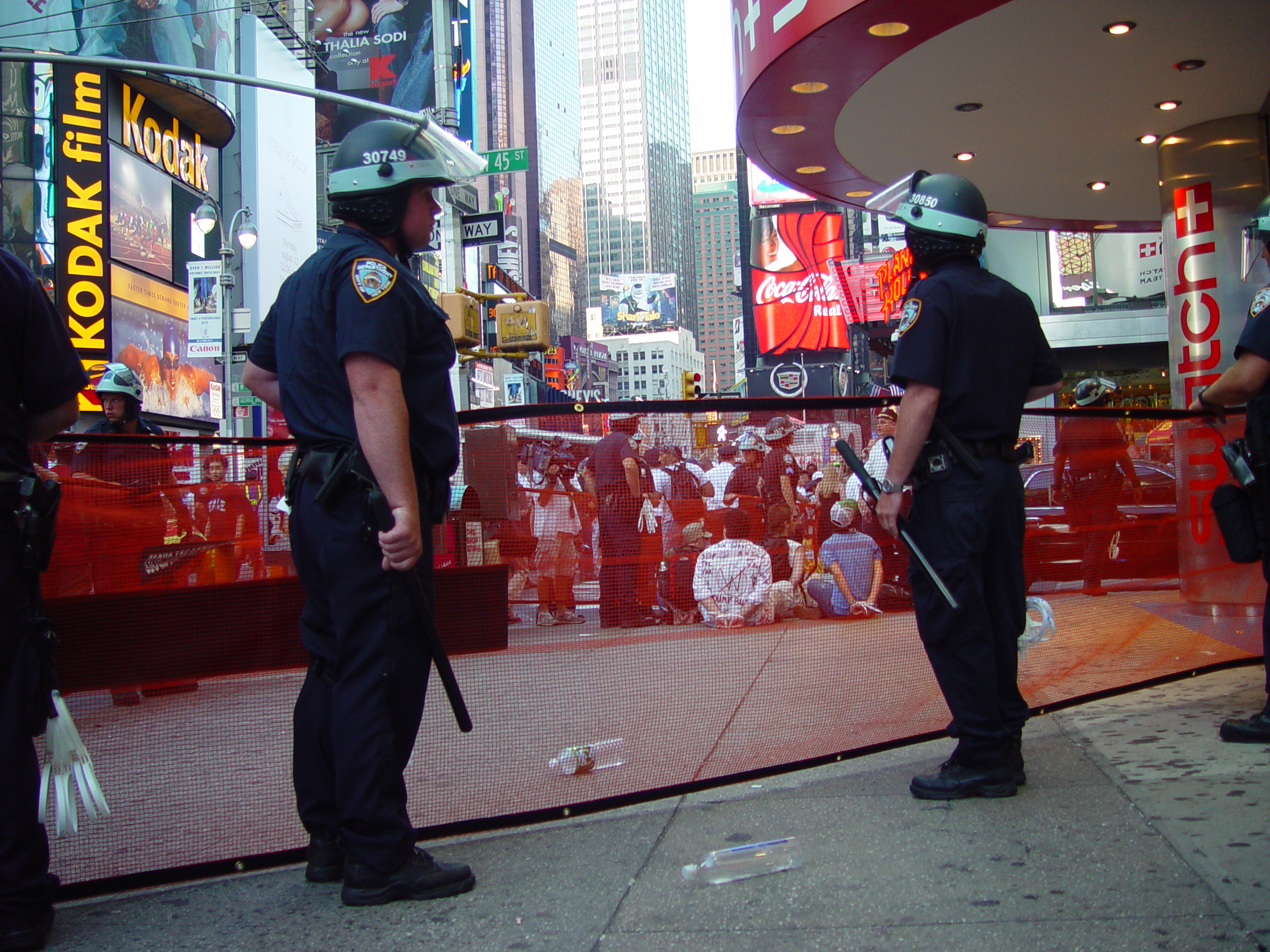
NYPD providing security at Times Square

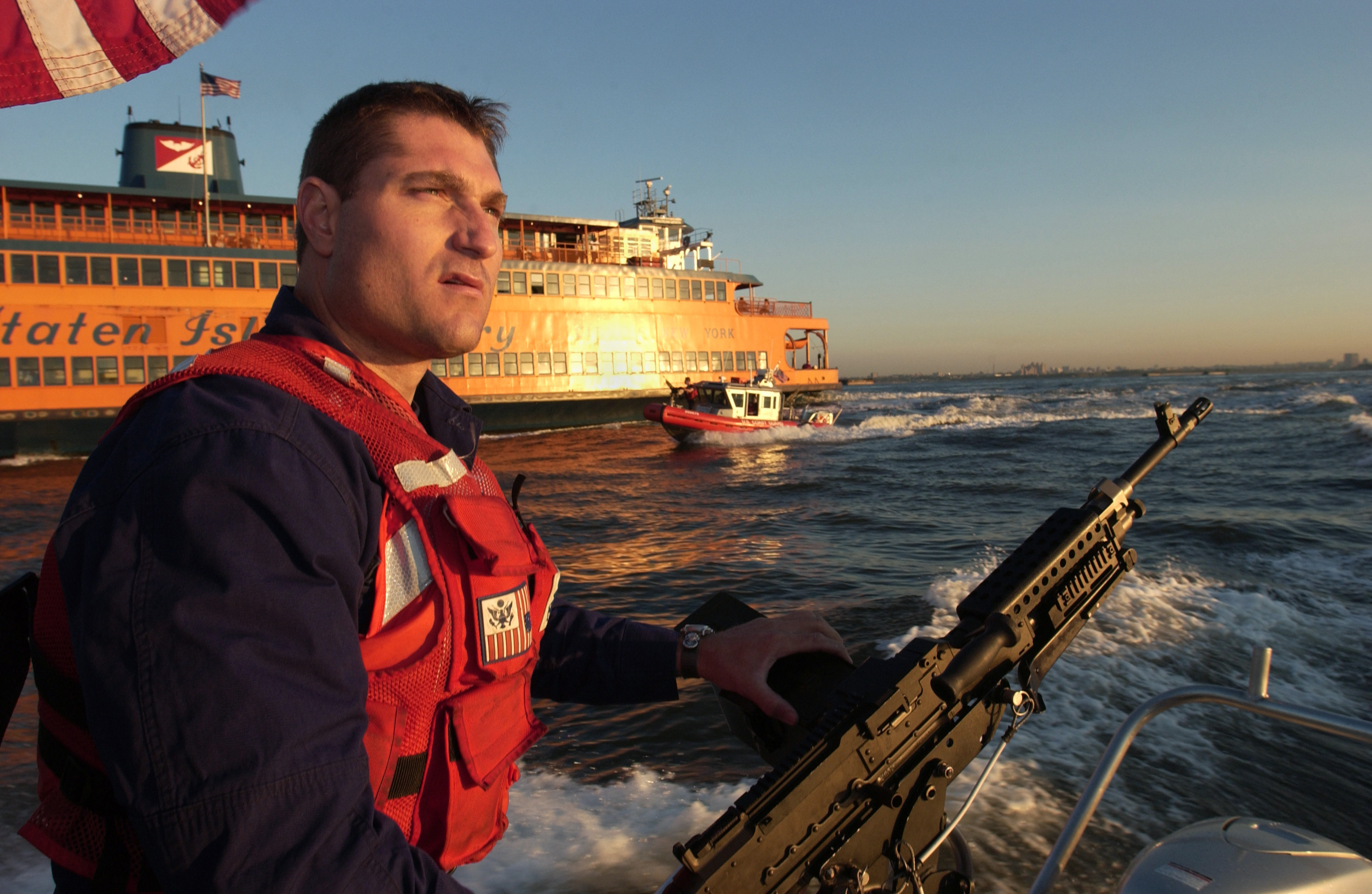
United States Navy and Coast Guard providing security during the convention

Like the 2004 Democratic National Convention in Boston, Massachusetts, the Department of Homeland Security (DHS) officially declared the 2004 Republican National Convention a National Special Security Event (NSSE). As such, the United States Secret Service was charged with employing and coordinating all federal and local agencies including the various bureaus of DHS, the FBI, and the NYPD to secure the venue from terrorist attacks. Expected security expenditures reached $70 million, $50 million of which was funded by the federal government.

The city employed an active beat of 10,000 police officers deployed as Hercules teams—uniformed in full riot gear and body armor, and equipped with submachine guns and rifles. Commuter and Amtrak trains entering and exiting Penn Station were scoured by bomb-sniffing dogs as uniformed police officers were attached to buses carrying delegates. All employees of buildings surrounding Madison Square Garden were subjected to thorough screening and background checks.

The NYPD infiltrated and compiled dossiers on protest groups (most of whom were doing nothing illegal), leading to over 1,800 arrests and subsequent fingerprinting.

=== Timing ===
The convention took place in New York City a week before the third anniversary of September 11. The attacks were a primary theme of the convention, from the choice of speakers to repeated invocations of the attacks. At the convention, there was a performance of "Amazing Grace" by Daniel Rodriguez, a tribute to those killed on September 11. Relatives of three of the victims spoke and talked about how September 11 brought the country together. Contributing musically were Brooks & Dunn, Sara Evans, Lee Ann Womack, Darryl Worley, Jaci Velasquez, Dana Glover, and Dexter Freebish.

== Speakers ==
Early in the summer leading up to the 2004 Republican National Convention, Republican National Committee Chairman Ed Gillespie announced the first slate of convention speakers. He added, "It is an honor to announce the addition of these outstanding Americans to the 2004 Republican National Convention program. For the past three and a half years, President Bush has led with strength and compassion and these speakers reflect that." Chief Executive Officer of the Convention Bill Harris commented, "These speakers have seen President Bush's strong, steady leadership and each will attest to his character from a unique perspective. Their vast experience and various points of view are a testament to the depth and breadth of the support for the Republican ticket in 2004."

=== Zell Miller ===
Considered to be one of the most interesting choices for speakers at the convention was a keynote address by Georgia Senator Zell Miller, a conservative Democrat. Miller had consistently voted with Republicans. In an editorial in The Wall Street Journal, Miller cited that the reason for his defection was that, "I barely recognize my party anymore." He continued, "Today, it's the Democratic Party that has mastered the art of division and diversion. To run for president as a Democrat these days you have to go from interest group to interest group, cap in hand, asking for the support of liberal kingmakers." He finished by saying, "I still believe in hope and opportunity and, when it comes right down to it, Mr. Bush is the man who represents hope and opportunity."

His keynote address was a visceral smite to Democrats and an excoriating attack on John Kerry, blaming him for the divisions in America. Notably, he mocked Kerry's call for strength in the armed forces by noting several important military projects that Kerry had opposed, saying that Kerry wanted "forces armed with what - spitballs?" Including Senator Edward Kennedy of Massachusetts, he claimed "no pair has been more wrong, more loudly, more often, than the two senators from Massachusetts: Ted Kennedy and John Kerry."

In his speech, Miller also heaped his praise for 1940 Republican presidential nominee Wendell Willkie for supporting President Franklin Roosevelt's establishment of a military draft, raising concerns about Bush's intentions to reintroduce conscription.

Miller also delivered the keynote address on behalf of Bill Clinton in 1992 at Madison Square Garden. He remained a Democrat in the Senate until leaving in 2005 (he was not running for reelection).

=== Tribute to Ronald Reagan ===
Former president Ronald Reagan, under whom Bush's father had served as vice president, passed away the previous June after suffering from Alzheimer's disease for nearly a decade. Nancy Reagan's spokesperson announced that the former First Lady fully supported President Bush for the general election. The spokesperson added that while the former First Lady and her children would be absent from the 2004 Republican National Convention, President Reagan's son with Jane Wyman, Michael Reagan, had accepted an invitation to address the delegates. Nancy Reagan appeared in the filmed tribute he introduced. He dedicated the film to everyone who helped make his father president of the United States.

During the convention, delegates paid tribute to Reagan in different ways. Many of the speakers from California and Illinois, including House Speaker Dennis Hastert, mentioned Reagan in their speeches and compared Reagan to Bush. Those from Illinois, including Hastert, compared Bush to both Reagan and Abraham Lincoln, another native son of their state.

=== Chairpeople ===
Name	Position/Notability
Dennis Hastert	51st Speaker of the United States House of Representatives (1999–2007) Leader of the House Republican Conference (1999–2007) U.S. Congressman from IL-14 (1987–2007)
Linda Lingle	6th Governor of Hawaii (2002–2010)
Several deputy co-chairs were named as a ceremonial honor

=== Day one: Monday, August 30, 2004 ===
==== Principal speakers ====
Name	Position/Notability
Michael Bloomberg	108th Mayor of New York City (2001–2013)
Rudy Giuliani	107th Mayor of New York City (1994–2001)
John McCain	U.S. Senator of Arizona (1987–2018) 2000 Republican presidential candidate

==== Featured speakers ====
Name	Position/Notability
George Allen	U.S. Senator from Virginia (2001–2007) 67th Governor of Virginia (1994–1998)
Lindsey Graham	U.S. Senator from South Carolina (2003–present)
Angie Harmon	Actress and Model (1987–present)
Bernard Kerik	Acting Minister of the Interior of Iraq (2003) 40th Police Commissioner of New York City (2000–2001)
Elisabeth Hasselbeck	Co-host of The View (2003–2013)
Edward I. "Ed" Koch	107th Mayor of New York City (1978–1989) (Democratic)
Marc Racicot	Chair of the Republican National Committee (2001–2003) 21st Governor of Montana (1993–2001)
Jason Sehorn	NFL Cornerback (1994–2003)
Ron Silver	12th President of the Actors' Equity Association (1991–2000) Actor (1974–2009) (Independent)
Bob Taft	67th Governor of Ohio (1999–2007)
Ann Wagner	Vice Chair of the Republican National Committee (2001–2005) Chairwoman of the Missouri Republican Party (1999–2005)

==== Quotations ====
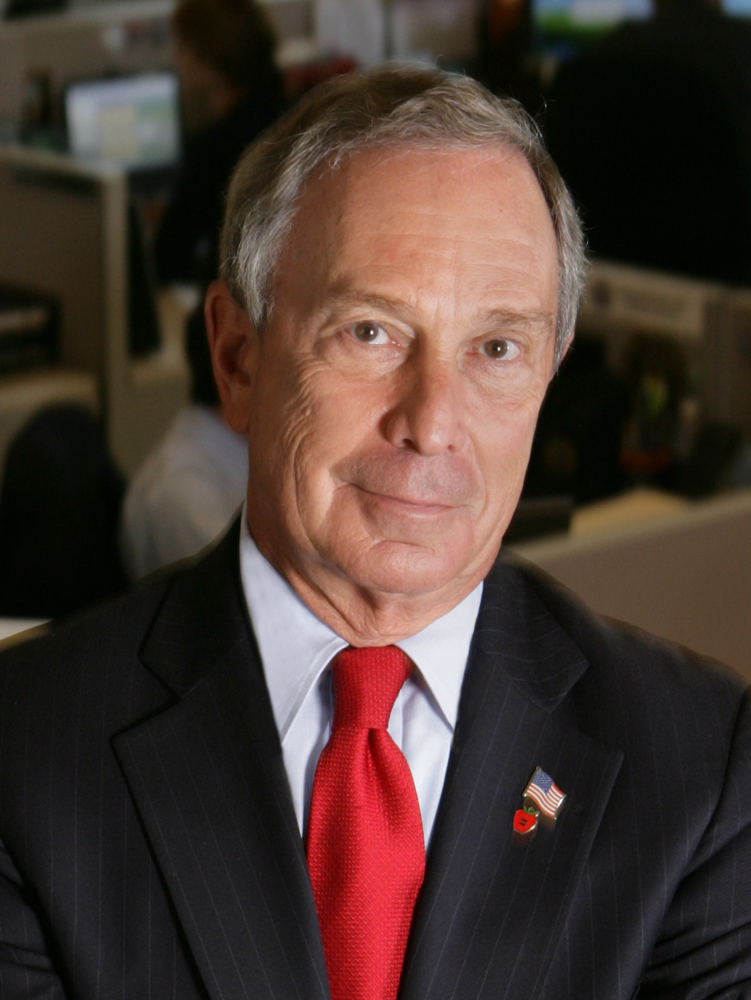

"We should remember, it wasn't so long ago that confidence in New York was in short supply. When I took the oath of office nearly three years ago, we were a city in mourning a city that had, in a few dreadful hours, lost almost 3,000 of our own husbands, wives, sons, and daughters from every part of the nation, and every corner of the globe. There were those who doubted then whether this city could hold onto the gains made during the 90s under Mayor Giuliani. A lot of people were wondering what the future held for New York City, or whether we even had a future. But neither America nor President Bush ever stopped believing in us. Nearly two years ago, with the city's fate still a question mark in many minds, our President decided that this Convention would come to New York. This was a show of faith that required courage and vision one that all New Yorkers will not forget. And today it fills me with enormous pride and gratitude to tell everyone that New York City is back!"

— Michael Bloomberg

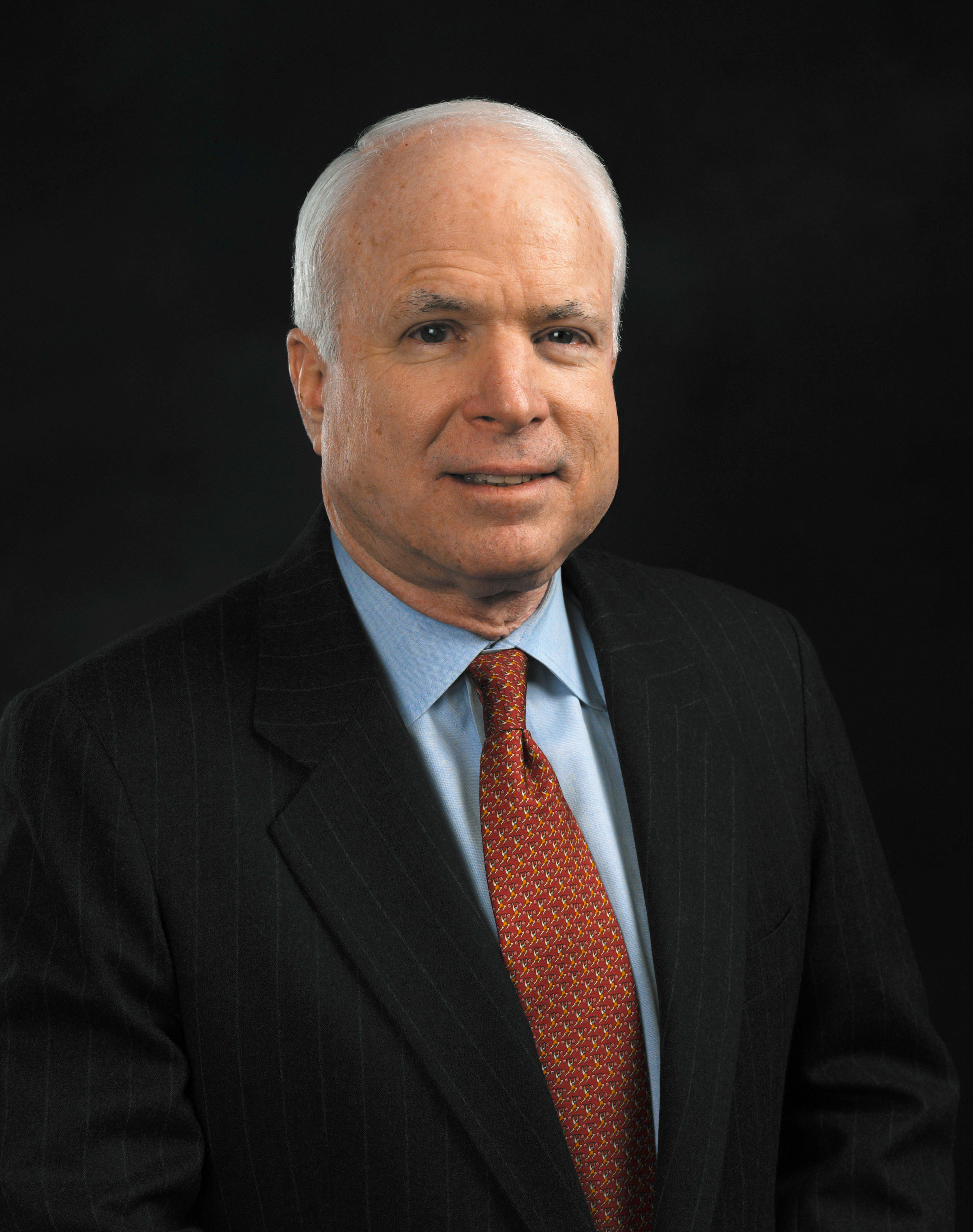

"We are Americans first, Americans last, Americans always. Let us argue our differences. But remember we are not enemies, but comrades in a war against a real enemy, and take courage from the knowledge that our military superiority is matched only by the superiority of our ideals, and our unconquerable love for them. Our adversaries are weaker than us in arms and men, but weaker still in causes. They fight to express a hatred for all that is good in humanity. We fight for love of freedom and justice, a love that is invincible. Keep that faith. Keep your courage. Stick together. Stay strong. Do not yield. Do not flinch. Stand up. Stand up with our President and fight. We're Americans. We're Americans, and we'll never surrender."

— John McCain

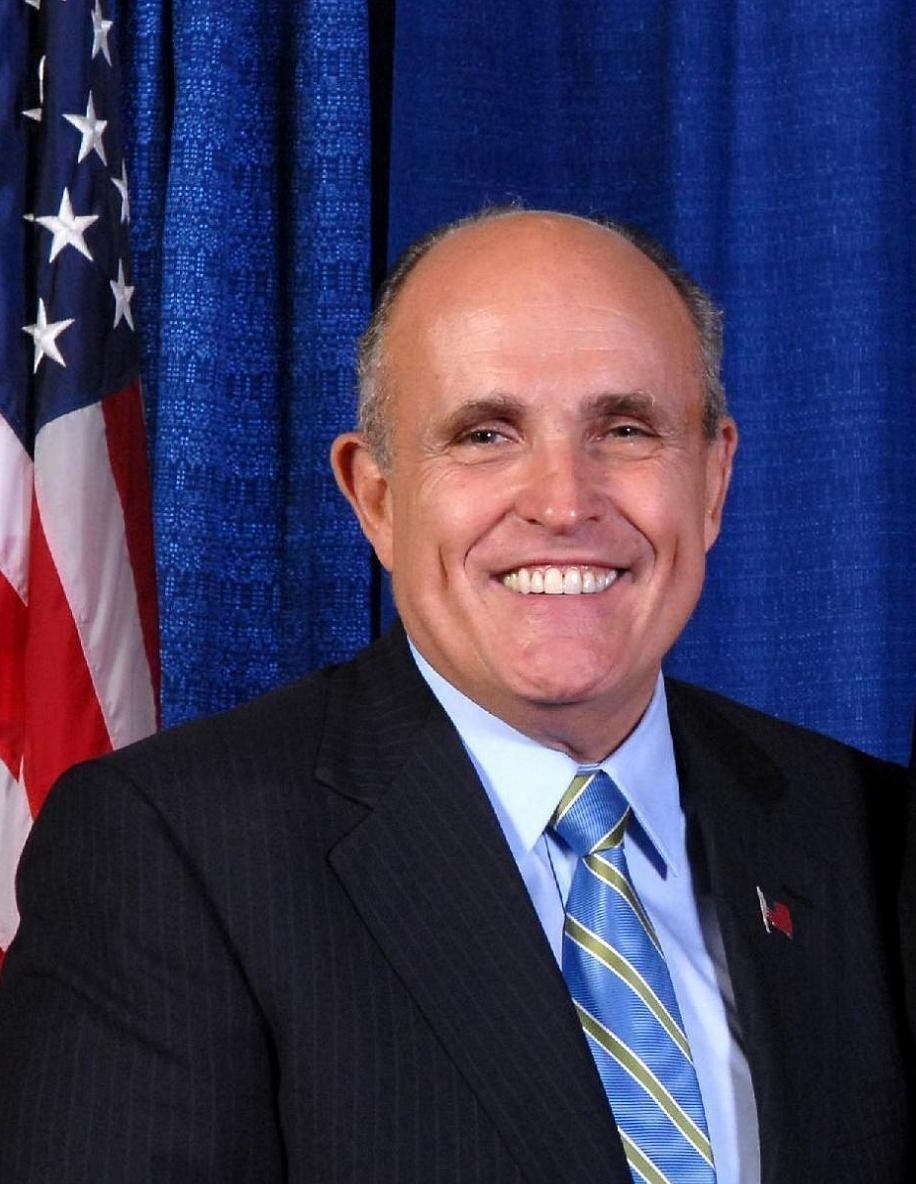

"From the first Republican President, Abraham Lincoln, to President George W. Bush our party's great contribution is to expand freedom in our own land and all over the world. And our party is at its best when it makes certain that we have a powerful national defense in a still very dangerous world. I don't believe we're right about everything and Democrats are wrong about everything. Neither party has a monopoly on virtue. But I do believe that there are times in our history when our ideas are more necessary and important for what we are facing."

— Rudy Giuliani

=== Day two: Tuesday, August 31, 2004 ===
==== Principal speakers ====
Name	Position/Notability
Laura Bush	First Lady of the United States (2001–2009) speech by wife of presidential nominee
Rod Paige	7th United States Secretary of Education (2001–2005)
Arnold Schwarzenegger	38th Governor of California (2003–2011)

==== Featured speakers ====
Name	Position/Notability
Sam Brownback	U.S. Senator of Kansas (1996–2011)
George P. Bush	Son of Governor Jeb Bush of Florida Nephew of George W. Bush
Norm Coleman	U.S. Senator of Minnesota (2003–2009)
Elizabeth Dole	U.S. Senator of North Carolina (2003–2009) 20th U.S. Secretary of Labor (1989–1990) 8th U.S. Secretary of Transportation (1983–1987) Wife of Bob Dole
Bill Frist	U.S. Senator from Tennessee (1995–2007) Senate Majority Leader (2003–2007)
Erika Harold	Miss Illinois 2002 Miss America 2003
Anne Northup	U.S. Congresswoman from KY-03 (1997–2007)
Michael S. Steele	7th Lieutenant Governor of Maryland (2003–2007)

==== Quotations ====
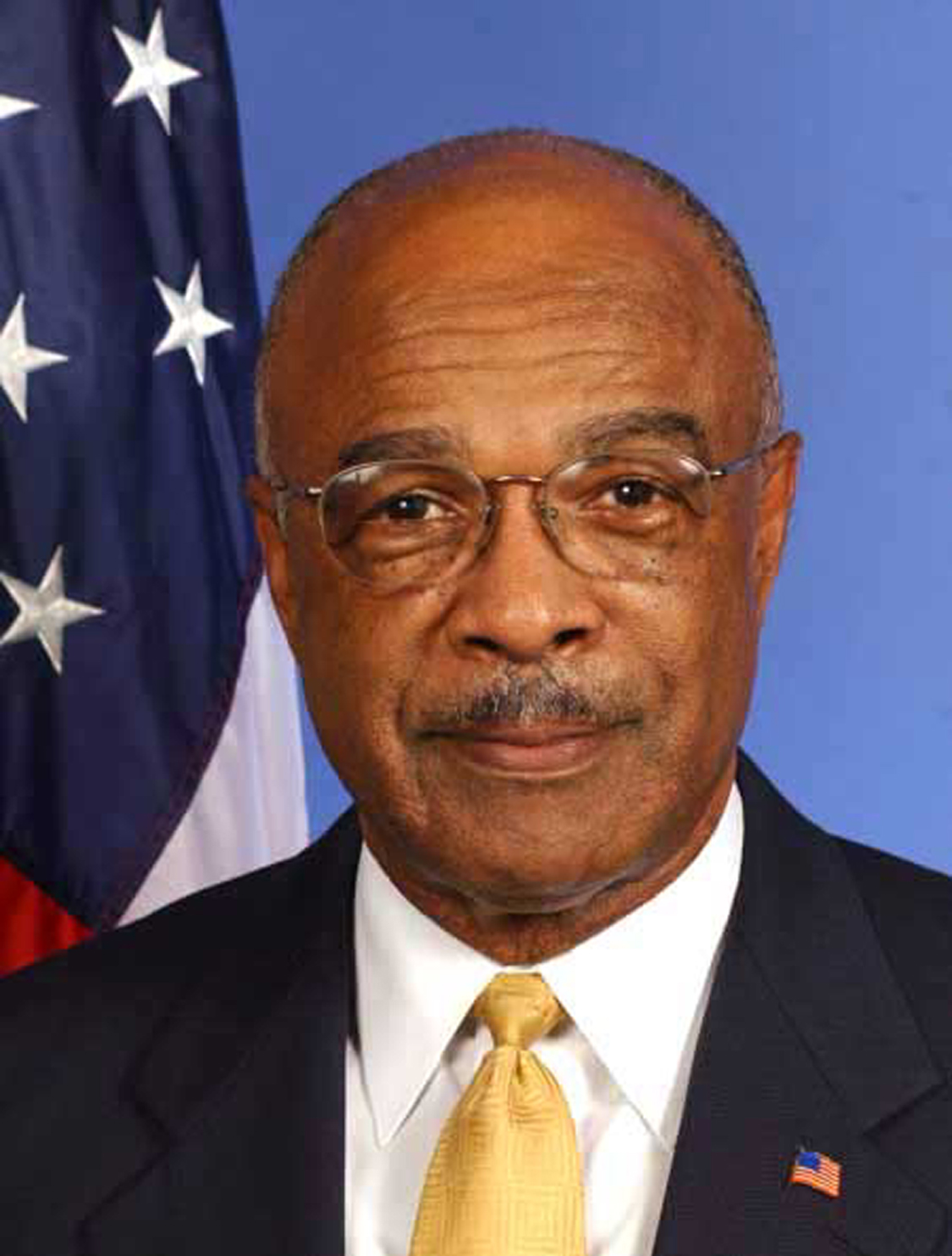

"We live in a great country. A nation of good people in pursuit of great ideals defined by our Founders, defended by citizen-soldiers, and delivered to us. We inherited a great nation. So must our children! No nation whatever the size of its armed forces or economy can sustain greatness unless it educates all, not just some, of its citizens. No one understands that better than President Bush. He's always had a compassionate vision for education: Students challenged by high standards; teachers armed with proper resources; parents empowered with information and choices. Young adults with meaningful diplomas in their hands not despair in their hearts."

— Rod Paige

"My fellow Americans, how do you know if you are a Republican? I'll tell you how. If you believe that government should be accountable to the people, not the people to the government, then you are a Republican! If you believe a person should be treated as an individual, not as a member of an interest group, then you are a Republican! If you believe your family knows how to spend your money better than the government does, then you are a Republican! If you believe our educational system should be held accountable for the progress of our children, then you are a Republican! If you believe this country, not the United Nations, is the best hope of democracy in the world, then you are a Republican! And, ladies and gentlemen if you believe we must be fierce and relentless and terminate terrorism, then you are a Republican!"

— Arnold Schwarzenegger

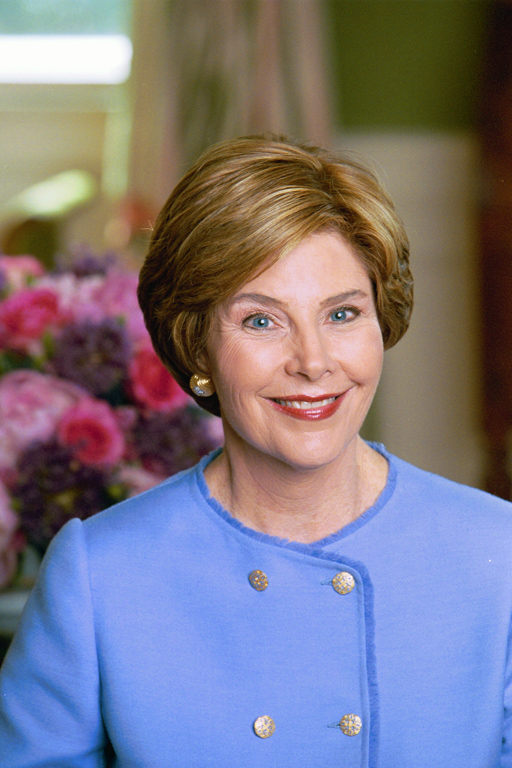

"This time of war has been a time of great hardship for our military families. The President and I want all our men and women in uniform and their wives and husbands, mothers and fathers, sons and daughters to know we appreciate their sacrifice. We know it will mean a more peaceful future for our children and grandchildren. No American President ever wants to go to war. Abraham Lincoln didn't want to go to war, but he knew saving the union required it. Franklin Roosevelt didn't want to go to war—but he knew defeating tyranny demanded it. And my husband didn't want to go to war, but he knew the safety and security of America and the world depended on it. I remember some very quiet nights at the dinner table. George was weighing grim scenarios and ominous intelligence about potentially even more devastating attacks. I listened many nights as George talked with foreign leaders on the phone, or in our living room, or at our ranch in Crawford. I remember an intense weekend at Camp David. George and Prime Minister Tony Blair were discussing the threat from Saddam Hussein. And I remember sitting in the window of the White House, watching as my husband walked on the lawn below. I knew he was wrestling with these agonizing decisions that would have such profound consequence for so many lives and for the future of our world. And I was there when my husband had to decide. Once again, as in our parents' generation, America had to make the tough choices, the hard decisions, and lead the world toward greater security and freedom."

— Laura Bush

=== Day three: Wednesday, September 1, 2004 ===
==== Balloting ====
President Bush was nominated at the end of a "rolling roll call" that had started the day before, when Pennsylvania's delegation cast the deciding votes.

Republican National Convention presidential vote, 2004
Candidate	Votes	Percentage
George W. Bush	2,508	99.96%
Abstentions	1	0.04%
Totals	2,509	100.00%

==== Principal speakers ====
Name	Position/Notability
Lynne Cheney	Second Lady of the United States (2001–2009) Wife of Dick Cheney
Dick Cheney	46th Vice President of the United States (2001–2009) (Vice presidential nominee)
Zell Miller	U.S. Senator from Georgia (Democratic) (Keynote Speaker)

==== Featured speakers ====
Speaker	Position/Notability
Elaine Chao	24th U.S. Secretary of Labor (2001–2009) Wife of U.S. Senator Mitch McConnell from Kentucky
Kerry Healey	70th Lieutenant Governor of Massachusetts (2003–2007)
Linda Lingle	6th Governor of Hawaii (2002–2010)
Mitch McConnell	U.S. Senator from Kentucky (1985–present) Husband of U.S. Secretary of Labor Elaine Chao of Kentucky
Rob Portman	U.S. Congressman from OH-02 (1993–2005)
Michael Reagan	Adopted son of Ronald Reagan
Mitt Romney	70th Governor of Massachusetts (2003–2007)
Paul Ryan	U.S. Congressman from WI-01 (1999–2019)
Brian Sandoval	30th Attorney General of Nevada (2003–2005)
Rick Santorum	U.S. Senator of Pennsylvania (1995–2007)

==== Quotations ====
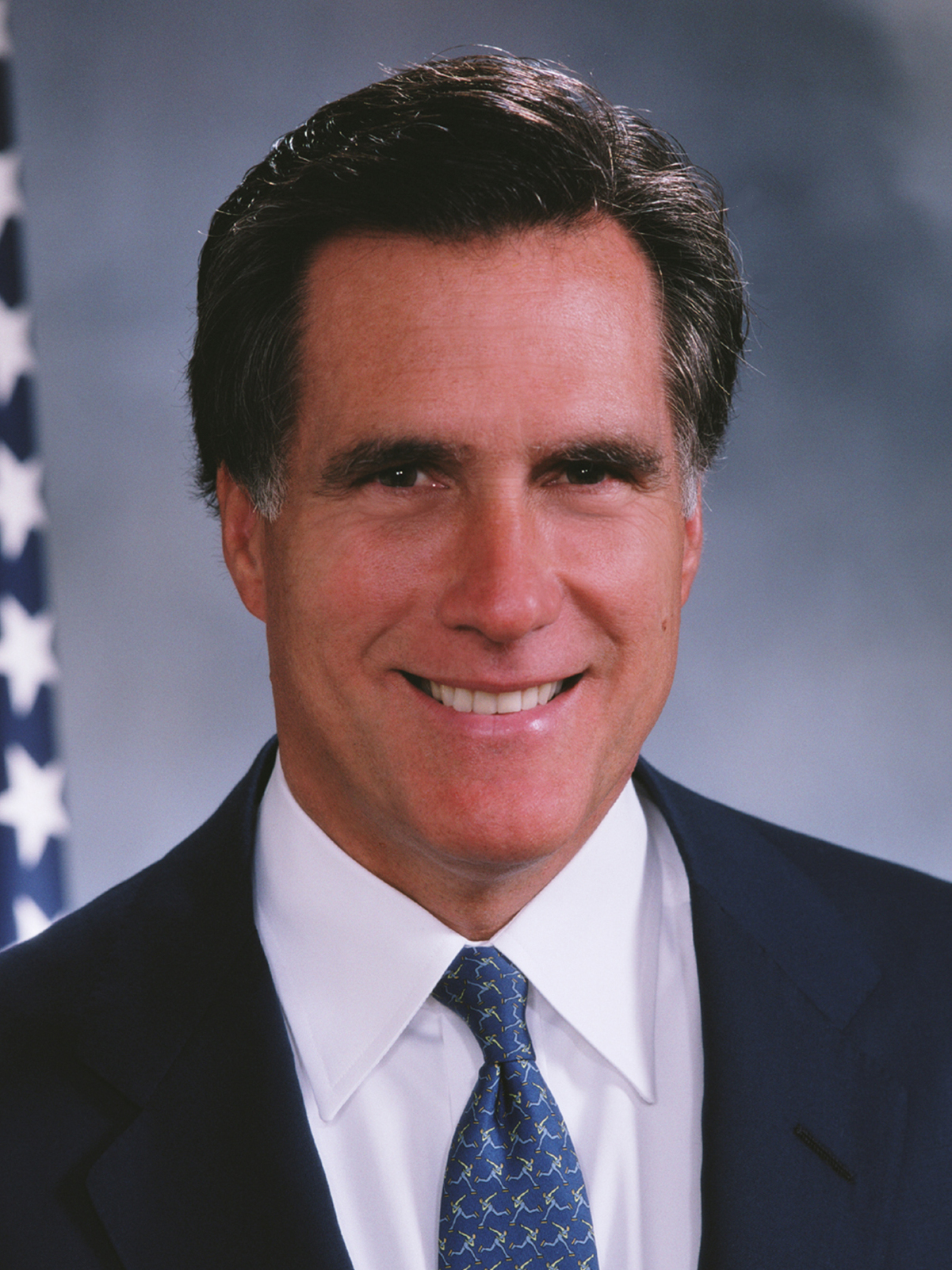

"We step forward by never forgetting that America is a force for good in the world, fighting for freedom and human rights. On this, there is no question: George W. Bush is right and the Blame America First Crowd is wrong! Americans will rise to every challenge we face"

— Mitt Romney

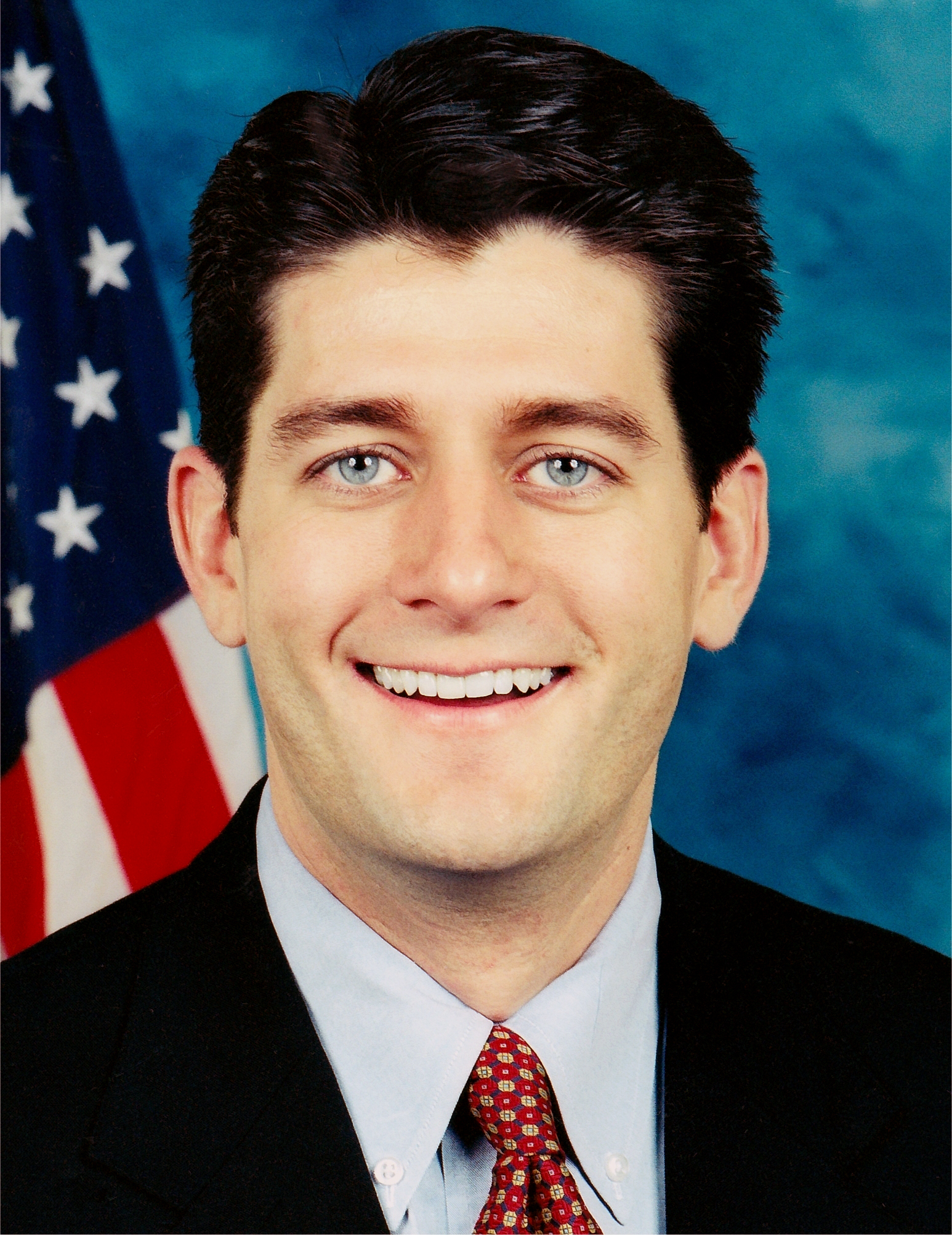

"John Kerry believes that government can spend our money better than we can. But most Americans don't share this view. That's why John Kerry has to preach the politics of division, of envy and resentment. That's why they talk so much about two Americas. But class warfare is not an economic policy. And the politics of division will not make America stronger, and it will not lead to prosperity."

— Paul Ryan

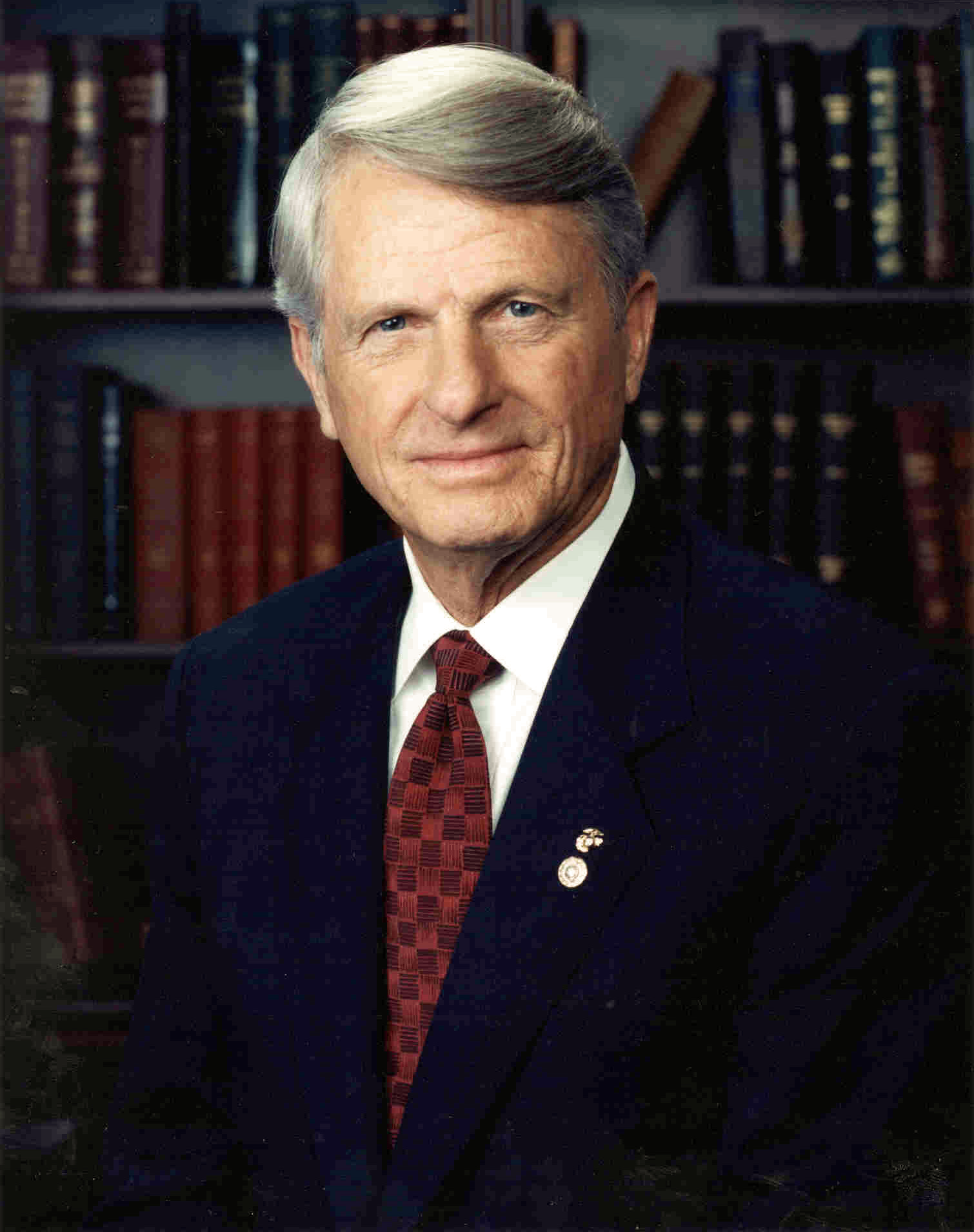

"Where is the bi-partisanship in this country when we need it most? Now, while young Americans are dying in the sands of Iraq and the mountains of Afghanistan, our nation is being torn apart and made weaker because of the Democrats' manic obsession to bring down our Commander-in-Chief."

— Zell Miller

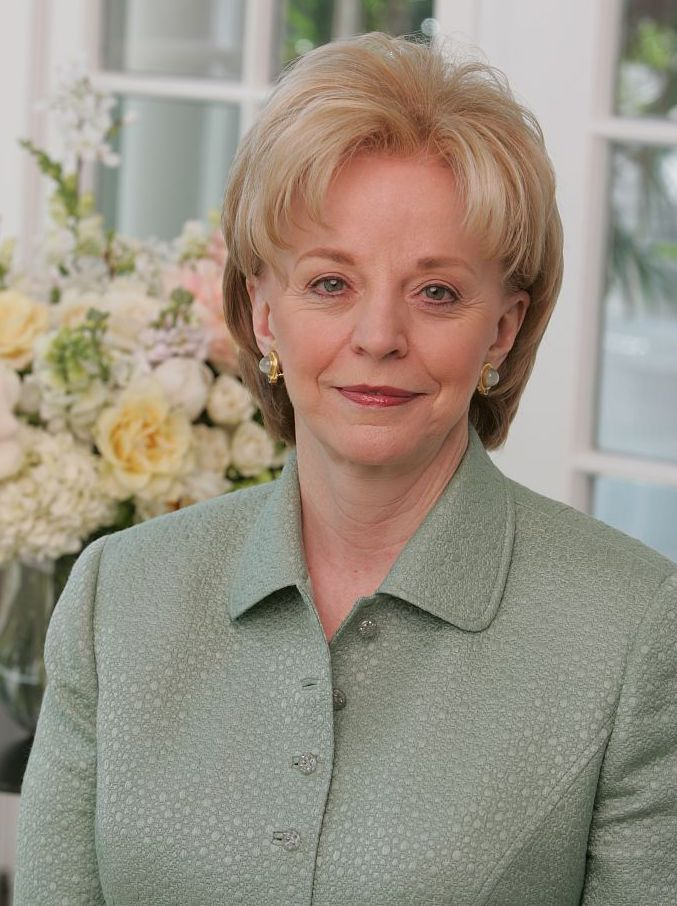

"In the weeks and months after September 11, I had so many people come up to me and say how glad they were that George Bush and Dick Cheney were in the White House. I knew exactly what they meant. These men are strong, they are steadfast, they are exactly the leaders we need at this moment in our history."

— Lynne Cheney

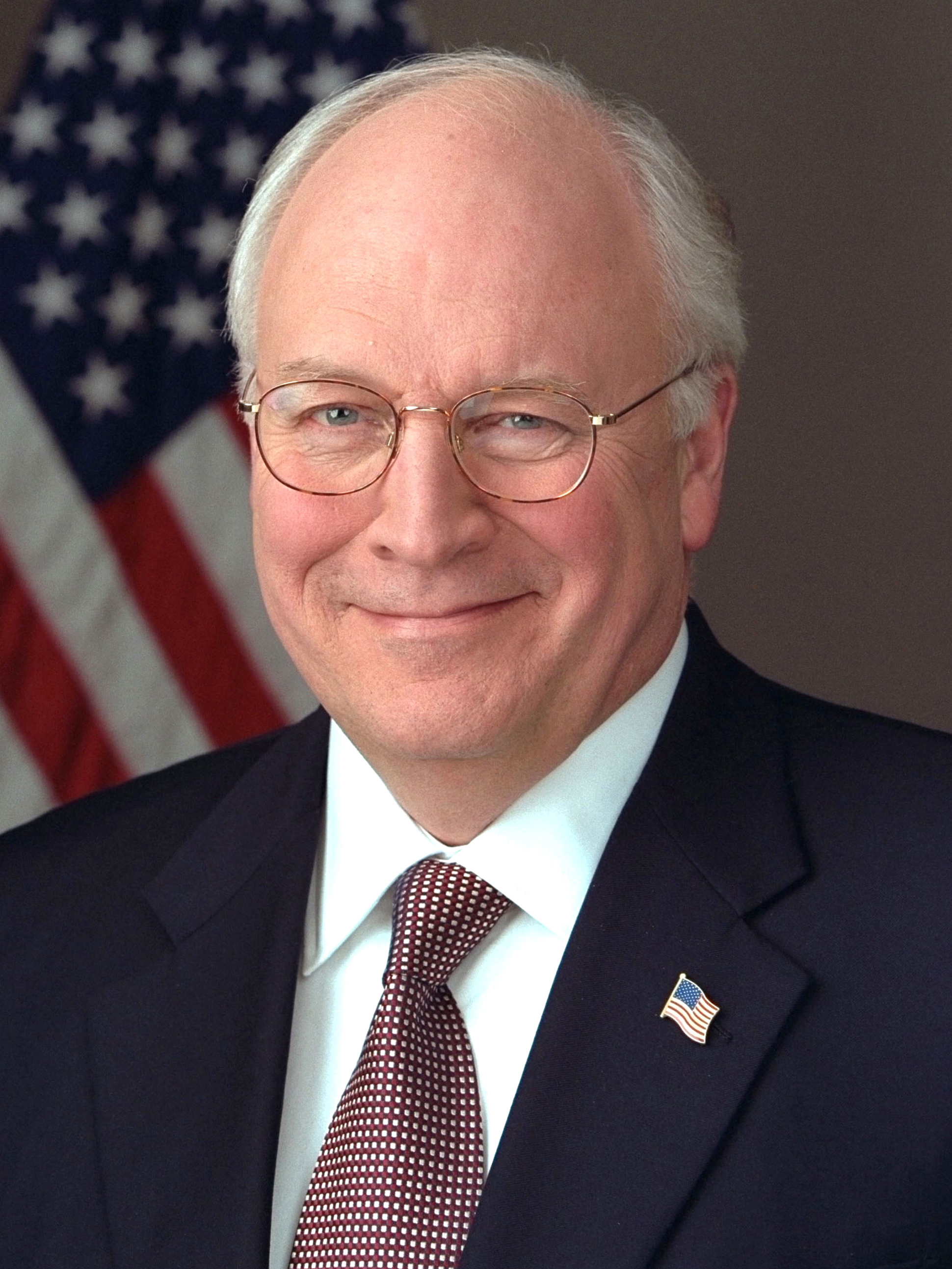

"I watch him at work every day. I have seen him face some of the hardest decisions that can come to the Oval Office and make those decisions with the wisdom and humility Americans expect in their president. George W. Bush is a man who speaks plainly and means what he says. He is a person of loyalty and kindness and he brings out these qualities in those around him. He is a man of great personal strength and more than that, a man with a heart for the weak, and the vulnerable, and the afflicted. We all remember that terrible morning when, in the space of just 102 minutes, more Americans were killed than we lost at Pearl Harbor. We remember the President who came to New York City and pledged that the terrorists would soon hear from all of us. George W. Bush saw this country through grief and tragedy he has acted with patience, and calm, and a moral seriousness that calls evil by its name. In the great divide of our time, he has put this nation where America always belongs: against the tyrants of this world, and on the side of every soul on earth who yearns to live in freedom. Fellow citizens, our nation is reaching the hour of decision, and the choice is clear. President Bush and I will wage this effort with complete confidence in the judgment of the American people."

— Dick Cheney

=== Thursday, September 2, 2004 ===
==== Balloting ====
Vice President Dick Cheney was nominated by voice vote for reelection.

==== Principal speakers ====
Name	Position/Notability
George Pataki	53rd Governor of New York (1995–2006)
George W. Bush	43rd President of the United States (2001–2009) (Presidential nominee)

==== Featured speakers ====
Name	Position/Notability
Edward Egan	Roman Catholic Cardinal Archbishop of New York (2000–2009)
Tommy Franks	Former Commander of the United States Central Command (2000–2003)
Dorothy Hamill	Gold medal olympic figure skater (1976)
Michael L. Williams	Railroad Commissioner of Texas (1999–2011) Assistant Secretary of Education for the Office for Civil Rights (1990–1993)
Mel Martínez	12th U.S. Secretary of Housing and Urban Development (2001–2004)
Lynn Swann	Member of the President's Council on Fitness, Sports, and Nutrition (2002–2005)

==== Quotations ====
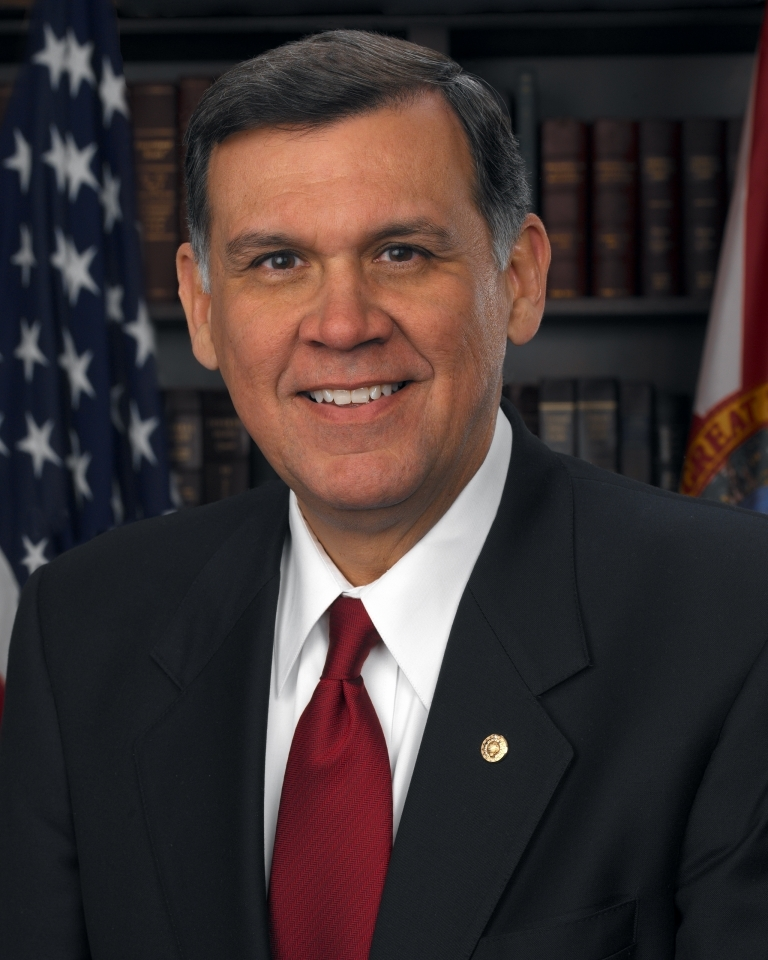

"Over forty years ago, my parents sent me, as a young child, out of a land ruled by a Communist dictator and now, just forty-eight hours ago, I became the Republican nominee for the United States Senate from the great State of Florida. Only in America! Only in America can a fifteen year old boy arrive on our shores alone, not speaking the language with a suitcase and the hope of a brighter future and rise to serve in the cabinet of the President of the United States. And, only in America can that same young boy, today, stand one step away from making history as the first Cuban-American to serve in the United States Senate."

— Mel Martinez

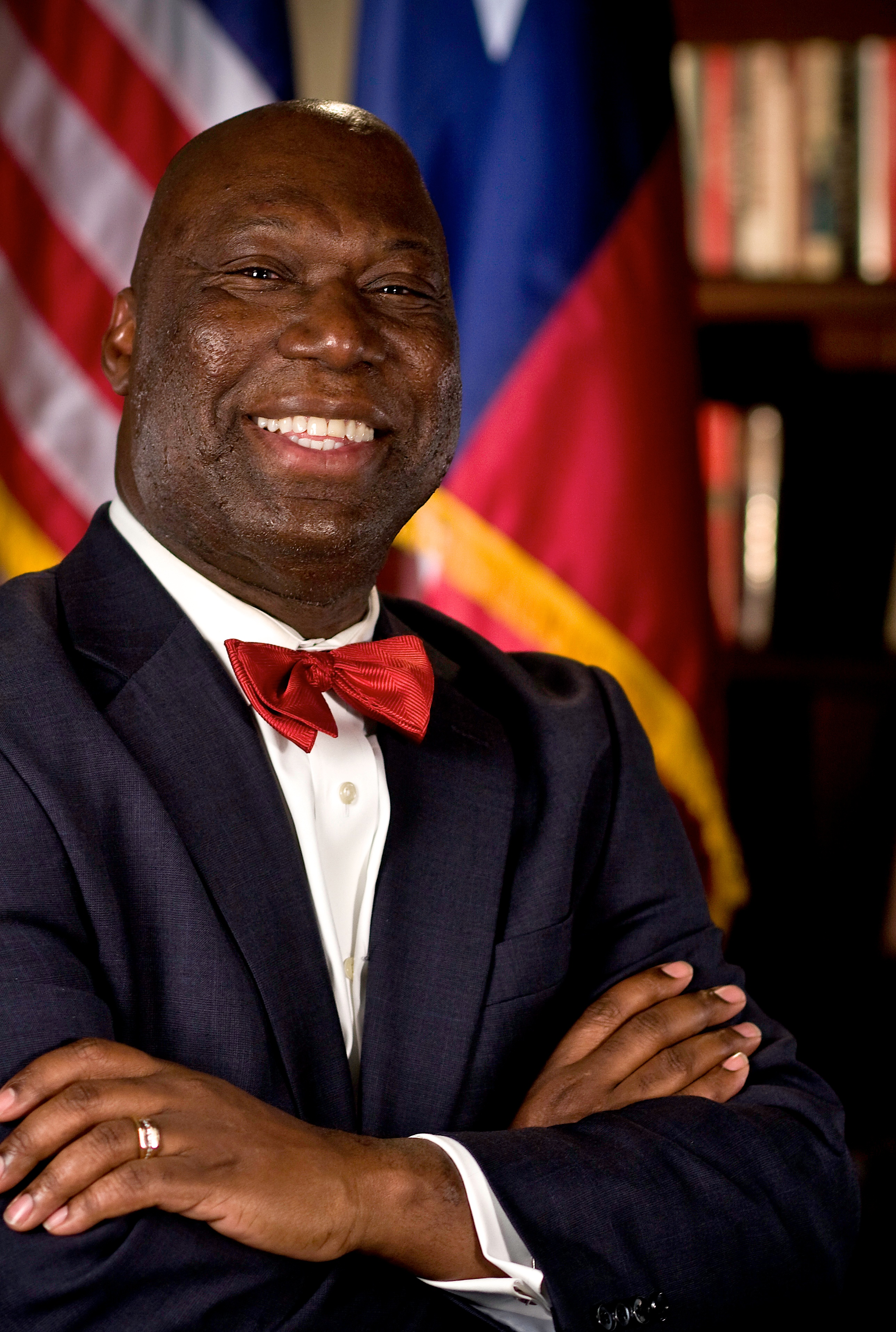

"Today, President Bush has one of the most diverse cabinets in American history. I'm here to tell you first-hand that his commitment to inclusion goes back to a time when nobody was watching. It goes back to a time when we drove around Midland in his Oldsmobile, baby seats in the back, scattered with toys for the twins. It goes back to a time when he did everything he could to avoid the dance floor at my wedding reception. It goes back to a time when we rolled up our sleeves, grabbed our hammers, and put up the walls of a home for a Christmas in April project."

— Michael L. Williams

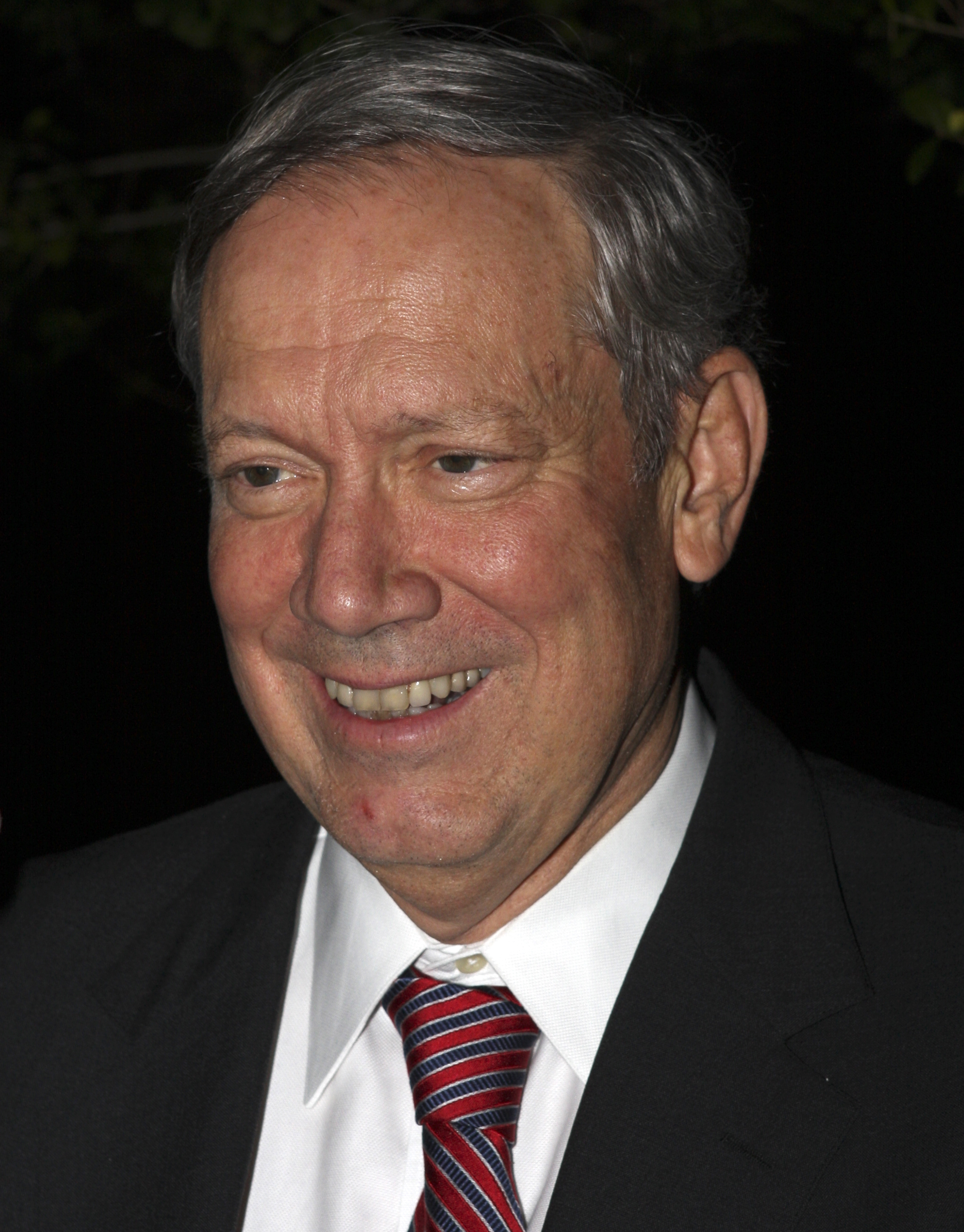

"This year, we will win one for the Gipper, and they will lose one with the Flipper"

— George Pataki

"Our strategy is succeeding. Four years ago, Afghanistan was the home base of al-Qaida, Pakistan was a transit point for terrorist groups, Saudi Arabia was fertile ground for terrorist fundraising, Libya was secretly pursuing nuclear weapons, Iraq was a gathering threat, and al-Qaida was largely unchallenged as it planned attacks. Today, the government of a free Afghanistan is fighting terror, Pakistan is capturing terrorist leaders, Saudi Arabia is making raids and arrests, Libya is dismantling its weapons programs, the army of a free Iraq is fighting for freedom, and more than three-quarters of al-Qaida's key members and associates have been detained or killed. We have led, many have joined, and America and the world are safer."

— George W. Bush

"In the last four years, you and I have come to know each other. Even when we don't agree, at least you know what I believe and where I stand."

— George W. Bush

"To everything we know there is a season a time for sadness, a time for struggle, a time for rebuilding. And now we have reached a time for hope. This young century will be liberty's century. By promoting liberty abroad, we will build a safer world. By encouraging liberty at home, we will build a more hopeful America. Like generations before us, we have a calling from beyond the stars to stand for freedom. This is the everlasting dream of America and tonight, in this place, that dream is renewed. Now we go forward grateful for our freedom, faithful to our cause, and confident in the future of the greatest nation on earth. God bless you, and may God continue to bless America."

— George W. Bush

== Protests ==
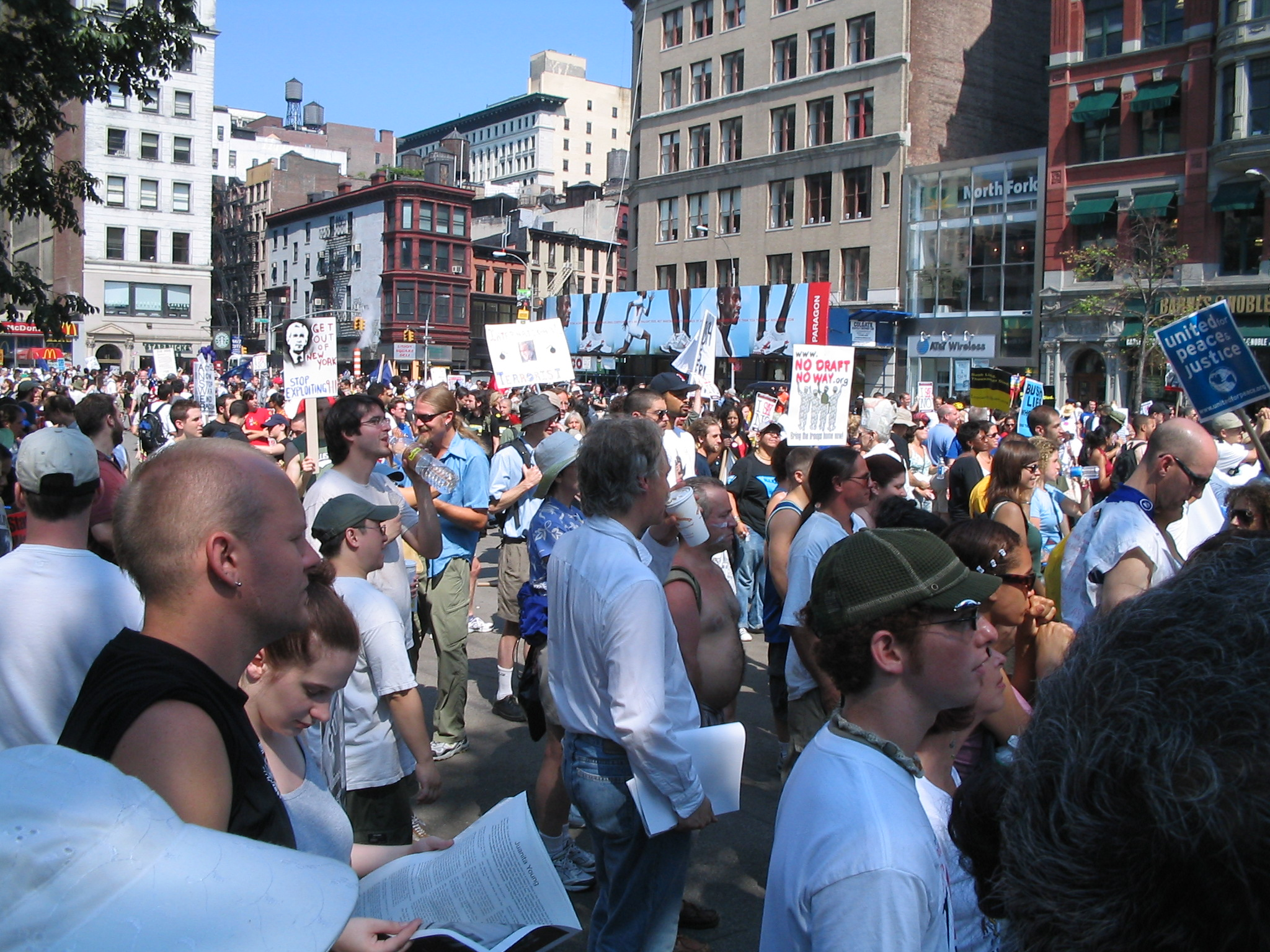
Protesters gather in Union Square for a march

Protest activity included marches, rallies, performances, demonstrations, exhibits, and acts of civil disobedience in New York City to protest the 2004 Republican National Convention and the nomination of President George W. Bush for the 2004 U.S. presidential election, as well as a much smaller number of people who marched to support Bush at the convention.

On May 17, 2006 Amy Goodman, host of Democracy Now! reported on the FBI launch of a criminal civil rights investigation of NYPD after Desert storm veteran Dennis Kyne went to trial and had all charges dropped due to video evidence showing the police falsified reports and sworn testimony.

== See also ==
- List of Republican National Conventions
- 2004 Republican National Convention protest activity
- 2004 Republican Party presidential primaries
- George W. Bush 2004 presidential campaign
- 2004 Democratic National Convention
- United States presidential nominating convention
- 2004 United States presidential election

Preceded by 2000; Philadelphia, Pennsylvania	Republican National Conventions	Succeeded by 2008; St. Paul, Minnesota
