= A. J. Crabill =

American education reform advocate

Airick Journey Crabill

Texas Deputy Commissioner of Education for Governance
- In office 2016–2020
- Commissioner: Mike Morath
- Preceded by: Position established
- Succeeded by: Steve Lecholop

Personal details
- Born: Airick Leonard West; 1979 (age 46–47) Kansas City, Missouri
- Known for: Education reform advocacy
- Awards: 2019 James Bryant Conant Award
- Website: Official website

Airick Journey Crabill (born Airick Leonard West in 1979) is an American education reform advocate and public speaker serving as the director of governance at the Council of the Great City Schools since 2020. He previously served as the Texas Education Agency's Deputy Commissioner for Governance from 2016 to 2020, and served on the board of the Kansas City Public Schools from 2008 to 2016.

== Early life ==
West was born in Kansas City, Missouri in 1979. He was raised in and out of foster care. He struggled without a stable home. He left school early to pursue a job in the computer industry. For a while, he worked for a web development firm after which, he founded his own firm.

He later moved to the Ivanhoe neighborhood in Kansas City, joining the Ivanhoe Neighborhood Council, and becoming involved in the efforts to revitalize the struggling neighborhood. He has also helped raise several young men in the neighborhood, giving them a place to stay when they are in need and allowing many of the kids in the neighborhood access to a computer during the day. West was also involved in mentorship programs in several schools in the city.

== Career ==
=== School Board Member ===
In the first half of 2008, he ran for a seat on the board of the Kansas City, Missouri School District. He obtained a sufficient number of signatures to be placed on the ballot. He had previously served on the boards of the Ivanhoe Neighborhood Council, Gordon Parks Elementary School, Stephanie Waterman Foundation, Simply Equine Assisted Therapy, and University of Missouri Extension. He was also the originator of "The Ivanhoe Project," a program at the Kansas City School of Urban Education that placed teachers training to work in urban-area schools in inner-city residences to expose them to the environments their students come from.

After he was elected to the school board, he was later appointed school board president in 2010. In August 2011, the school district superintendent John Covington suddenly resigned. Some on the board blamed West for the resignation, accusing him of being too directly involved in the operations of the school district and frustrating the superintendent. It was not until a few years later that Covington clarified to The Kansas City Star that the decision to leave was not in any way motivated by West's actions. Following this incident, West briefly resigned his presidency on the board but remained as a member and was re-elected as president in September. The school district also lost its accreditation in September 2011.

In March 2012, he was again part of the direct community outreach program to re-enroll students that had dropped out of school, part of an effort to regain the school district's accreditation. In April 2012, he was re-elected to the at-large seat on the school board for another four-year term. Efforts to achieve higher enrollment levels continued in his new term with more door-to-door efforts to educate parents and register students for the school year beginning in August 2013.

In 2013, West was a finalist for the Urban Educator of the Year Award, which is awarded by the Council of the Great City Schools. In 2014, Missouri State School Board announced that the Kansas City School District had regained provisional accreditation. In 2016, West elected not to run again for a seat on the school board, ending his tenure on April 13. He had served eight years on the board. During his tenure, the school district made several academic and operational improvements. An audit of the school district's finances returned no concerns compared to nineteen problem areas in 2008.

=== Texas Education Agency ===
In early 2016, West officially changed his name to Airick Journey Crabill as part of an adult adoption, taking the last name of his childhood foster parents.

In April 2016, the new Texas Commissioner of Education Mike Morath appointed Crabill as one of his Deputy Commissioners. According to the Texas Education Agency (TEA) website, Crabill is in charge of the agency's efforts to improve schools and ensure accreditation as the Deputy Commissioner of Governance. His full list of responsibilities originally included "school improvement, charters, governance, complaints management, system support & innovation, investigations, school discipline/safety, accreditation, waivers, and districts of innovation,".

According to Crabill, as he frequently states, his main focus is "improving student outcomes".

In his role, Crabill developed and frequently facilitated leadership and governance training sessions to educate current and potential school administrators and board members on how to better execute the responsibilities of their positions. At times, his workshops are obligatory as part of the conditions for approval of the improvement plans submitted by underperforming schools. In November 2016, Crabill sent a letter to eleven school boards of under-performing districts inviting them to undergo training to adjust their plans to improve their respective districts.

By 2019, Crabill's role had changed to special advisor to Texas Education Commissioner Mike Morath while he facilitated meetings on the Houston Independent School District takeover. In 2019, Crabill was awarded the James Bryant Conant Award by the Education Commission of the States. He was appointed in 2020 by the commissioner as a conservator to oversee staffing and budgeting at the DeSoto Independent School District. In a Dec 2023 conservatorship update, DeSoto, announced that within the first year or so governance scores had increased from 12 to 80, fiscal operations from F to C, and academics from D/F to B, and on this basis as of Sept 2022 active conservatorship transitioned to a passive role.
