= 2008 Texas Railroad Commissioner election =

- November 4, 2008
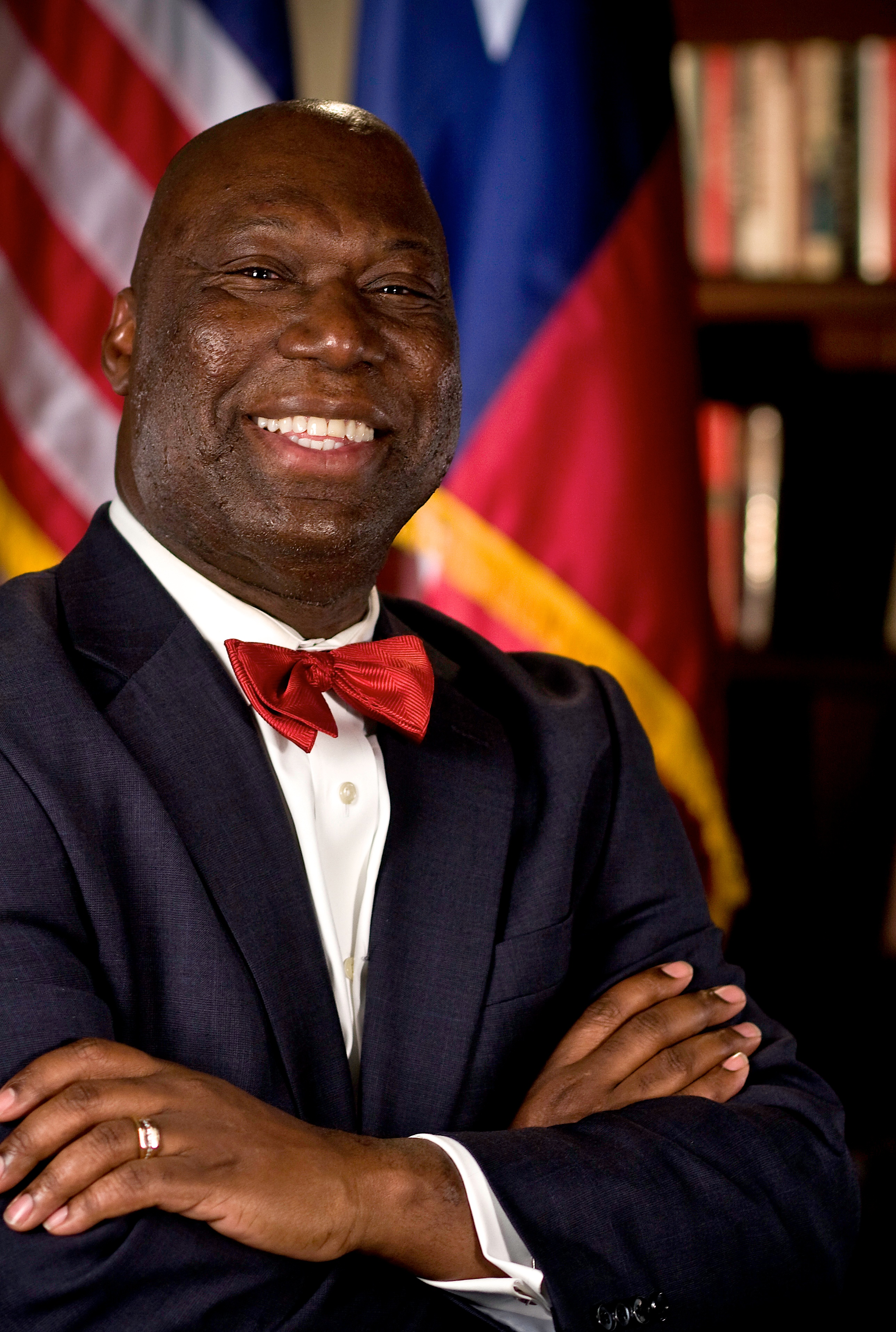

Nominee	Michael L. Williams	Mark Thompson
Party	Republican	Democratic
Popular vote	4,003,789	3,406,174
Percentage	52.13	44.35
Williams
40–50%
50–60%
60–70%
70–80%
80–90%
Thompson
40–50%
50–60%
60–70%
70–80%
80–90%
Williams/Thompson tie
40–50%
Railroad Commissioner before election
Michael L. Williams
Republican
Elected Railroad Commissioner
Michael L. Williams
Republican

The 2008 Texas Railroad Commissioner election was held on November 4, 2008, to elect a member of the Railroad Commission of Texas. Incumbent Republican commissioner Michael L. Williams won reelection against Democratic candidate Mark Thompson.

== Republican primary ==
Republican primary results by county Williams 100% No votes

Incumbent Republican Michael L. Williams ran unopposed for the Republican nomination. Williams was first appointed to the Commission in 1998 by governor George W. Bush.

2008 Texas Railroad Commissioner Republican primary
Party	Candidate	Votes	%
Republican	Michael L. Williams (incumbent)	990,127	100.0
Total votes		990,127	100.0

== Democratic primary ==
Democratic primary results by county Thompson: 40–50%; 50–60%; 60–70%; 70–80%; Henry: 40–50%; 50–60%; 60–70%; Hall: 40–50%; No votes: No votes

Three candidates ran for the Democratic nomination:

- Mark Thompson, visual impairment counselor and former police officer
- Dale Henry, retired petroleum engineer and 2006 Democratic nominee for Railroad Commissioner
- Art Hall, former member of San Antonio City Council

Texas law requires primary candidates to receive over 50% of the vote to win the nomination; if no candidate receives a majority, the top two candidates advance to a runoff election.

Dale Henry, a retired petroleum worker and former Mills County commissioner, ran as an environmentalist who would use his industry knowledge to ensure the commission protects the environment and prioritizes public safety. Henry had previously ran for the Railroad Commission twice: in 2004 as a Republican and in 2006 as a Democrat.

Art Hall, an attorney and investment banker, was first elected to the San Antonio City Council in 2003. Hall campaigned on environmental conversation and protection while also wanting the state to support the development of alternative energy. During the primary campaign, Art Hall suggested that the Railroad Commission should be renamed to reflect its actual roles (the Commission no longer regulates railroads, instead regulating energy production in the state). The Austin American-Statesman endorsed Hall, describing him as a Democratic "rising star". Hall received the endorsements of most major newspapers in the state. The The Bryan-College Station Eagle, in its editorial board's endorsement of Henry, criticized Hall for a lack of familiarity with the commission, as he had initially mentioned railroad safety as part of his campaign. The paper described Hall as an impressive candidate who was, unfortunately, "running for the wrong office".

Thompson ran as an outsider, accusing the current Railroad Commission of patronage. Despite being a political novice, he performed well in the primary, receiving 48% of the vote, almost clearing the threshold for winning outright, despite not having a campaign treasurer or spending any money. Thompson became interested in running for office following a gas explosion in Wylie. Henry, also a political novice, advanced to the runoff with 27% of the vote, while Hall, the favorite of most newspapers in the state, was eliminated with only 23% of the vote.

2008 Texas Railroad Commissioner Democratic primary
Party	Candidate	Votes	%
Democratic	Mark Thompson	943,326	48.34
Democratic	Dale Henry	540,175	27.68
Democratic	Art Hall	467,794	23.97
Total votes		1,951,295	100.0

The primary runoff was held on April 8. Thompson defeated Henry with around 59% of the vote. While the first round of the primary was held alongside the contentious Democratic presidential primary, leading to high turnout, the runoff was the only statewide race on the ballot, leading to exceptionally low voter interest.

Newspapers generally considered Thompson to have run a low-effort campaign compared to his opponents in both the primary and runoff. Prior to the March primary, the The Bryan-College Station Eagle noted that Thompson did not reply to their editorial board and had made "few appearances across the state". Following the April runoff, Robert Seltzer described Thompson in the San Antonio Express-News as campaigning "like a man who did not want the job", attributing his victory over Henry to an apathetic electorate.

Democratic primary runoff results by county Thompson: 50–60%; 60–70%; 70–80%; Henry: 50–60%; 60–70%; Thompson/Henry tie: 50%; No votes: No votes

2008 Texas Railroad Commissioner Democratic primary runoff
Party	Candidate	Votes	%
Democratic	Mark Thompson	111,126	59.20
Democratic	Dale Henry	76,582	40.80
Total votes		187,708	100.0

== Campaign ==
In the general election, Thompsom campaigned on opposing corruption, with plans to ban commissioners from accepting gifts from energy companies. Thompson specifically accused Williams of being "bought and paid for by the gas industry". He also supported changing the agency's name, arguing the current name helped keep the business of the Commission obscure. Thompson also continued to run on safety, accusing the Williams of inaction resulting in preventable deaths from natural gas explosions.

Williams focused on his experience during the campaign, as well as attacking Democrats broadly as being untrustworthy and too eager to tax and redistribute wealth. He received the endorsements of newspapers such as the Fort Worth Star-Telegram, the San Antonio Express-News, and the Austin American-Statesman. The election was not generally expected to be competitive, with experts predicting in July that Williams would win reelection.

During the election, Williams, the first African American elected to a non-judicial statewide office in Texas, gave a speech in which he stated that he was inspired by Obama's victory in the 2008 Democratic presidential primaries, while reiterating his support for the Republican nominee John McCain in the general election. Williams was viewed as a likely Republican candidate for higher office, leading to criticism from Thompson.

David Floyd, a businessman from Cedar Park, was the Libertarian nominee, though he did not actively campaign.

== Results ==
While Democrats performed well in the 2008 United States elections, their national strength was not enough to change Texas's status as a Republican stronghold. All statewide Republican candidates won, with Williams receiving around 52% of the vote in his victory over Thompson.

2008 Texas Railroad Commissioner election
Party	Candidate	Votes	%
Republican	Michael L. Williams (incumbent)	4,003,789	52.13
Democratic	Mark Thompson	3,406,174	44.35
Libertarian	David Floyd	270,078	3.52
Total votes		7,680,041	100.0
Republican hold			

== Aftermath ==
Predictions that Williams would seek higher office proved correct: Williams resigned from office on March 31, 2011, to run for Congress. He first entered the 2012 US Senate election, but withdrew from that race to run for the US House instead. After complications with redistricting, he ended up running in Texas's 25th congressional district. However, he lost the Republican primary, receiving only 10.5% of the vote. Republican Barry T. Smitherman was appointed to the Railroad Commission by governor Rick Perry following Williams's resignation and won the 2012 special election for the remainder of Williams's term.

Dale Henry ran again for Railroad Commissioner in 2012, losing in the general election to Republican Christi Craddick.
