= Louis E. Sturns =

American judge (born 1949)

Louis E. Sturns (born August 6, 1949) is an American lawyer and retired judge. In 1990, he became the first African American to serve on the Texas Court of Criminal Appeals, the state's court of last resort for criminal cases. He was also the first African American criminal district court judge in Tarrant County, Texas, and the first African American president of the Tarrant County Bar Association.

Sturns served as judge of Tarrant County Criminal District Court No. 1 from 1987 to 1990, on the Court of Criminal Appeals from 1990 to 1991, and as judge of the 213th District Court from 2007 until his retirement in 2018. He later presided over the court of inquiry into former Williamson County district attorney Ken Anderson's conduct in the wrongful conviction of Michael Morton.

== Early life and education ==
Sturns was born on August 6, 1949, near Henderson, Texas, and grew up in rural Rusk County. He attended segregated public schools before enrolling at Wichita State University. While attending Wichita State, he participated in the Reserve Officers' Training Corps, washed dishes, and drove school buses to help finance his education. He earned a bachelor's degree in political science from Wichita State in 1971 and a Juris Doctor degree from the University of Kansas School of Law in 1973.

== Legal and military career ==
After law school, Sturns worked in Fort Worth with civil-rights attorney L. Clifford Davis while awaiting admission to the bar. He then served for three years in the United States Army Judge Advocate General's Corps at Fort Hood, where his work included prosecution, criminal defense, and legal advising. After leaving the Army, he returned to Davis's law firm in Fort Worth.

== Judicial career ==
=== Tarrant County and Court of Criminal Appeals ===
Sturns was elected judge of Tarrant County Criminal District Court No. 1 and served from 1987 until 1990. During a 1988 murder trial, he allowed prosecutors to introduce DNA evidence after hearing a week of scientific testimony. The proceeding was the first use of DNA testimony in a Tarrant County murder trial.

In March 1990, Governor Bill Clements appointed Sturns to the Texas Court of Criminal Appeals. The appointment made Sturns the first African American judge to serve on the court. He served until 1991 and subsequently returned to private practice.

Governor Rick Perry appointed Sturns judge of Tarrant County's 213th District Court on August 31, 2007, succeeding Robert Gill. Sturns remained on that court until retiring in October 2018.

=== Michael Morton court of inquiry ===
In 2012, Texas Supreme Court Chief Justice Wallace B. Jefferson selected Sturns to lead a court of inquiry into allegations that Ken Anderson, the prosecutor in Michael Morton's 1987 murder trial, had withheld evidence from Morton's defense. Morton had served nearly 25 years in prison before DNA evidence led to his exoneration.

Following the inquiry, Sturns found that Anderson had intentionally concealed evidence and issued an arrest warrant for criminal contempt, tampering with evidence, and tampering with a government record. The case preceded the Texas Legislature's adoption of the Michael Morton Act, which expanded prosecutors' obligations to disclose evidence to defendants.

== Professional and civic service ==
Sturns has held positions on state and local boards, including the Texas Juvenile Justice Advisory Board, Texas Ethics Commission, Texas Public Safety Commission, Texas Racing Commission, and Trinity River Authority board of directors. He has also served as president of the Fort Worth Black Bar Association, chair of the Fort Worth Metropolitan Black Chamber of Commerce, and a trustee of Texas Wesleyan University.

His honors include the Army Commendation Medal, the NAACP Civil Justice and Humanitarian Award, the Tarrant County Bar Association's Silver Gavel Award, the Tarrant County Criminal Defense Lawyers Association's Judicial Excellence and Courage Award, and a lifetime achievement award from the Fort Worth Business Press.
