= Mike Morath =

American software developer and investor

Commissioner of the Texas Education Agency
- Incumbent
- Assumed office January 4, 2016
- Governor: Greg Abbott
- Preceded by: Michael L. Williams

Member of the DISD Board of Trustees for District 2
- In office 2011–2016
- Preceded by: Jack Lowe
- Succeeded by: Dustin Marshall

Personal details
- Born: 1977 (age 48–49)
- Education: George Washington University
- Profession: Software developer, politician
- Website: Official website

Michael Hunter Morath (born 1977) is an American software developer and investor. He most recently served as the commissioner of the Texas Education Agency. Prior to joining the agency, he served as a trustee for the Dallas Independent School District, where he advocated for school reform and home-rule. Morath began his career in the technology sector.

== Early life ==
Morath was born in 1977 and was raised, for a time, in a coal mining town close to Western Virginia. His family moved to North Texas, where he attended Garland High School, a public school in Garland, a suburb of Dallas, Texas. Morath had an interest in software development as early as age six when he wrote his first computer program. In high school, he developed a program to analyze his high school football team's offensive play-calling strategy.

After graduating from Garland High School in 1995, Morath attended George Washington University. He joined Alpha Phi Alpha, a historically and still predominately African-American fraternity and was a part of the Black Student Union, serving as director of communications. He graduated from George Washington with a degree in business administration, completing his bachelor's in two-and-a-half years.

== Career ==
After George Washington, Morath formed a software startup company that eventually failed. He then founded Minute Menu Systems, a company that provided technical and logistical support to child care programs as it relates to a federal food assistance program for low-income families.

=== Board of trustees ===
In 2011, Morath ran unopposed for a seat on the Board of Trustees to the Dallas Independent School District (DISD), representing District 7, which includes North Dallas and Lakewood. He decided to resign his position as CEO of Minute Menu Systems. In May 2011, he joined the board of what is the second-largest school district in Texas.

As a trustee in 2013, Morath advocated allowing the district to the funnel savings gained from a proposed voluntary accelerated three-year graduation plan for high school students to keep full-day pre-kindergarten programs funded. The programs were facing a return to a half-day schedule as a result of a 2011 state legislation that cut a combined $200 million from the school's budget.

Morath was re-elected as a board member for District 2 representing parts of North and East Dallas. He was initially opposed by Sabrina Martinez Harrison, who withdrew on March 3, 2014. Morath entered the May 10 election unopposed. At some point during his tenure as a trustee, Morath sold his company, Minute Menu, and formed Morath Investments.

Morath was also the originator of a home-rule movement in the DISD that began in early 2014. His idea was to use a never-before used provision in Texas' charter school legislation to the convert the school district into a "home-rule charter" system, allowing DISD more autonomy and self-governance. Although intended to allow the district the freedom to enact reforms, the idea drew criticism from some, especially the local teacher's unions, Texas State Teachers Association and Alliance AFT, who opposed the possibility of "fewer safeguards for teachers' jobs, lower pay or longer school years without a pay increase." The idea, as originally envisioned by Morath, never became realized.

In November 2015, Governor Greg Abbott named Morath the presiding officer on the new Texas Commission on Next Generation Assessments and Accountability. The commission was created by the Texas Legislature and consisted of a total of ten people. Besides Morath, the commission also includes three additional people appointed by the governor, three by Lieutenant Governor Dan Patrick and three by Speaker Joe Straus. The commission is tasked with proposing "changes to the state's method of student assessment and school accountability."

A month later, on December 14, the governor named Morath to replace Michael L. Williams, who retired, as Texas Commissioner of Education, the head of the Texas Education Agency. His appointment to the position was criticized by those that opposed his attempt to establish home rule control over the DISD.

=== Commissioner ===
In January 2016, Morath left his position on the DISD board to become the Commissioner of Education. He was sworn in on January 4, to lead the agency that is responsible for the state's 1,200 school districts.

As commissioner, Morath has, in several instances, exercised his power to intervene in the governance of under-performing school districts. In February 2016, he appointed Judy Castleberry as conservator of the South San Antonio independent school District. In March, following an investigation by the agency, Morath appointed Sharon Doughty as conservator of the Edgewood independent School District in San Antonio. He also announced that this would be followed by appointments to replace the vacant superintendent position and a board of managers to replace the elected members of the board of trustees. The new board of managers and superintendent were sworn in on May 24. In the case of the Hearne independent school District in May 2017, however, Morath reversed his own decision, made earlier in the year to appoint a replacement for the school board, allowing them to stay in power.

Morath has used his authority to intervene in the governance of Houston ISD or attempted to do so for several years. A state-appointed conservator has monitored the state's largest district since September 2016 and was given expanded authority in March 2019, stopping the district's elected board from completing their search for a permanent superintendent. Low performance in one of over 200 schools in HISD also resulted in Morath deciding to pursue appointing a board of managers, one of the options allowed under state law, despite the district's relatively high B rating. A state judge blocked Morath from replacing the district's elected board in January 2020. Following a 2018 finding by the U.S. Department of Education that Texas violated federal law regarding treatment of students with disabilities, TEA investigators in September 2020 again recommended state oversight after finding problems in the district's special education department.

In early 2016, following a glitch that erased the answers students inputted as part of a computerized state assessment test, Morath warned that the agency could reconsider its contract with the company, Educational Testing Service (ETS), which administers the State of Texas Assessments of Academic Readiness (STAAR). Calling the error "unacceptable," Morath announced his agency will impose a $20.7 million fine on ETS. He also announced that the test will not be used to determine whether students can advance to the fifth or eighth grades, as per usual.

In June 2020, Morath's decision to permit schools to reopen during the COVID-19 pandemic and not mandate face coverings was criticized by Zeph Capo who, as president of the Texas American Federation of Teachers, represents 65,000 teachers and staff at the state's schools.

On November 3, 2026, Gina Hinojosa was elected Governor of Texas. She promised to fire Morath on "day one" of her being in office. Hinojosa is expected to be inaugurated January 19, 2027.

== Personal life ==
At the time of his election to the board of trustees of the DISD in 2011, Morath was engaged to Laura Vondra, an optometrist. They are now married and have four children.
